= Werner Herzog filmography =

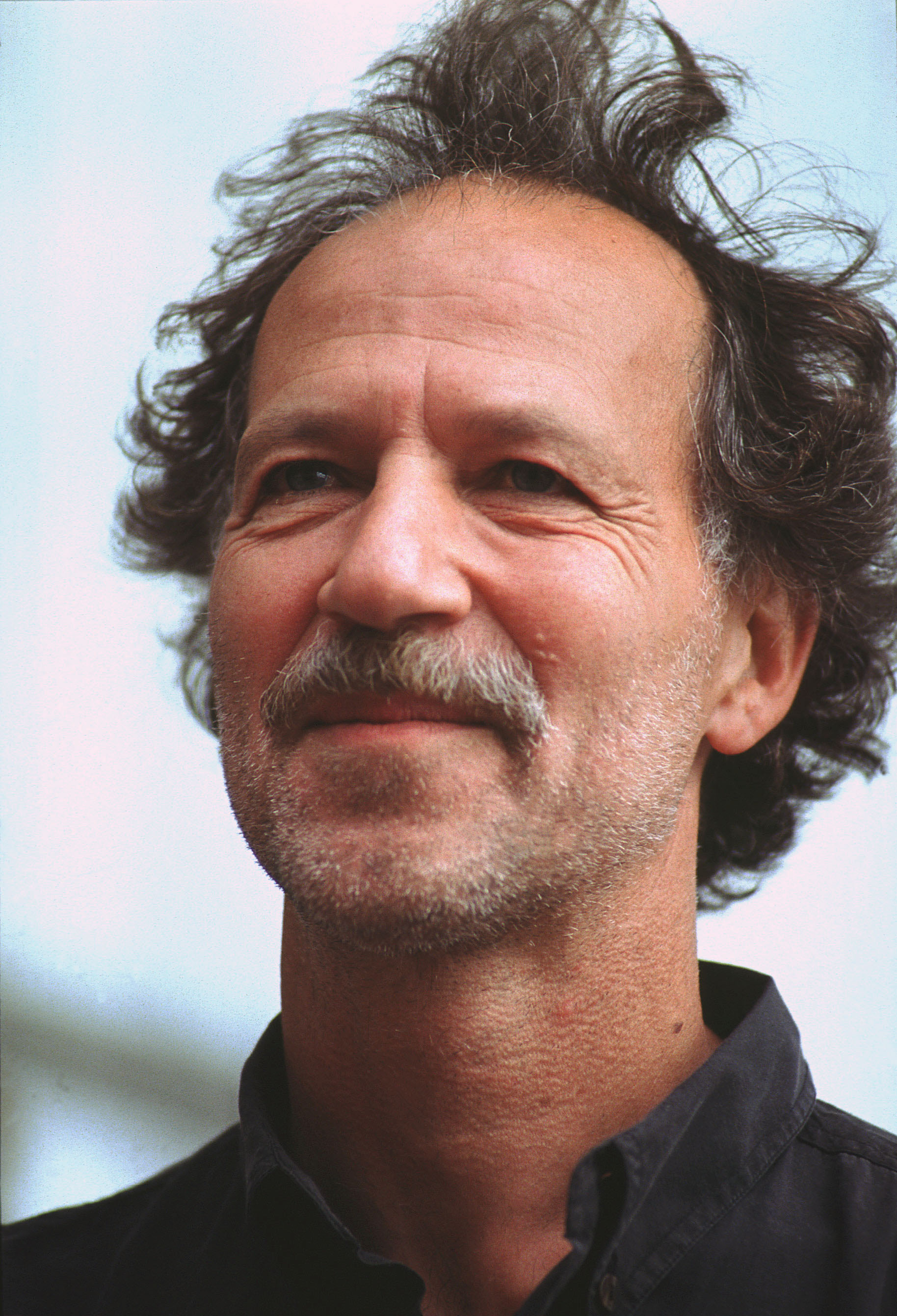
Herzog—pictured at the 1991 Venice International Film Festival—is well known for his distinctive voice (recording below).

Werner Herzog (born 1942) is a German filmmaker whose films often feature ambitious or deranged protagonists with impossible dreams. Herzog's works span myriad genres and mediums, but he is particularly well known for his documentary films, which he typically narrates.

In 1962, Herzog made his directorial debut with the German-language short Herakles. His feature film debut—Signs of Life (1968)—garnered him the Silver Bear at Berlinale. Six years later, Herzog's The Enigma of Kaspar Hauser (1974) won the Grand Prix at the Cannes Film Festival. Starting in this period, Herzog collaborated with actor Klaus Kinski on five films, Aguirre, the Wrath of God (1972), Nosferatu the Vampyre (1979), Woyzeck (1979), Fitzcarraldo (1982), and Cobra Verde (1987). Fitzcarraldo won Herzog the Best Director Award at Cannes. His tumultuous relationship with Kinski was the subject of Herzog's 1999 documentary My Best Fiend. Herzog directed two films in 2009, My Son, My Son, What Have Ye Done and the Nicolas Cage-starring Bad Lieutenant: Port of Call New Orleans, both of which were nominated for a Golden Lion at the Venice Film Festival. He has directed a number of other fictional feature films as well as shorts.

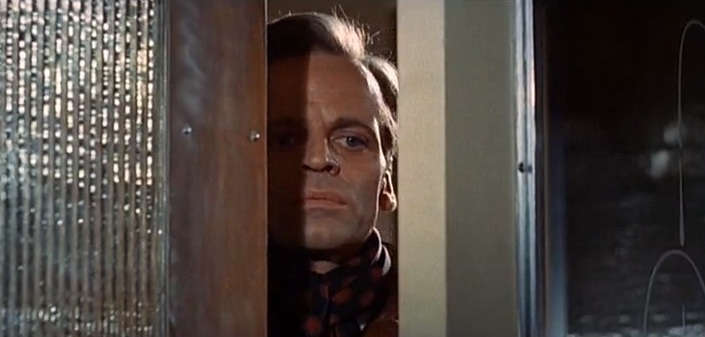
Herzog collaborated with actor Klaus Kinski (pictured) on five films.

Herzog made his documentorial debut with 1969's The Flying Doctors of East Africa. In his documentaries, Herzog often explores the "moral or existential abyss", commonly in nature. His first documentary to screen at Cannes, Fata Morgana (1971), for instance, pairs footage of barren African desert landscapes with a recitation of the Mayan creation myth, the Popol Vuh. Similarly, Herzog's film Lessons of Darkness (1992) matches Richard Wagner overtures with documentation of the Gulf War's wake of chaos and destruction in Kuwait. Lessons of Darkness was criticized for its supposed "aestheticizing" of war. As with his fictional works, Herzog's documentaries also examine nonconformists outside conventional society, such as Timothy Treadwell in his 2005 documentary Grizzly Man. Herzog studied the pilot Dieter Dengler in his 1997 documentary Little Dieter Needs to Fly, which he later remade into the 2006 feature film Rescue Dawn starring Christian Bale. The following year, his exploration of the lives of scientists in Antarctica—2007's Encounters at the End of the World—garnered him an Oscar nomination for Best Documentary. For his 2018 documentary Meeting Gorbachev, Herzog had extensive interviews with the Soviet leader. He has directed dozens of other documentaries, including shorts and television segments.

In addition to his own works, Herzog has appeared in other projects, including as the narrator or subject of documentaries and mockumentaries. He has appeared in two Les Blank documentaries, including Werner Herzog Eats His Shoe (1980), in which he eats his shoe after losing a bet to then-college student Errol Morris, and Burden of Dreams, shot during and about the chaotic filming of Herzog's Fitzcarraldo. Herzog has also appeared in commercial films and television series, often portraying villains, such as in the 2012 Tom Cruise film Jack Reacher, or, in 2019, The Mandalorian. He has made cameo appearances in The Simpsons, Parks and Recreation, and other television series.

== Fiction films ==
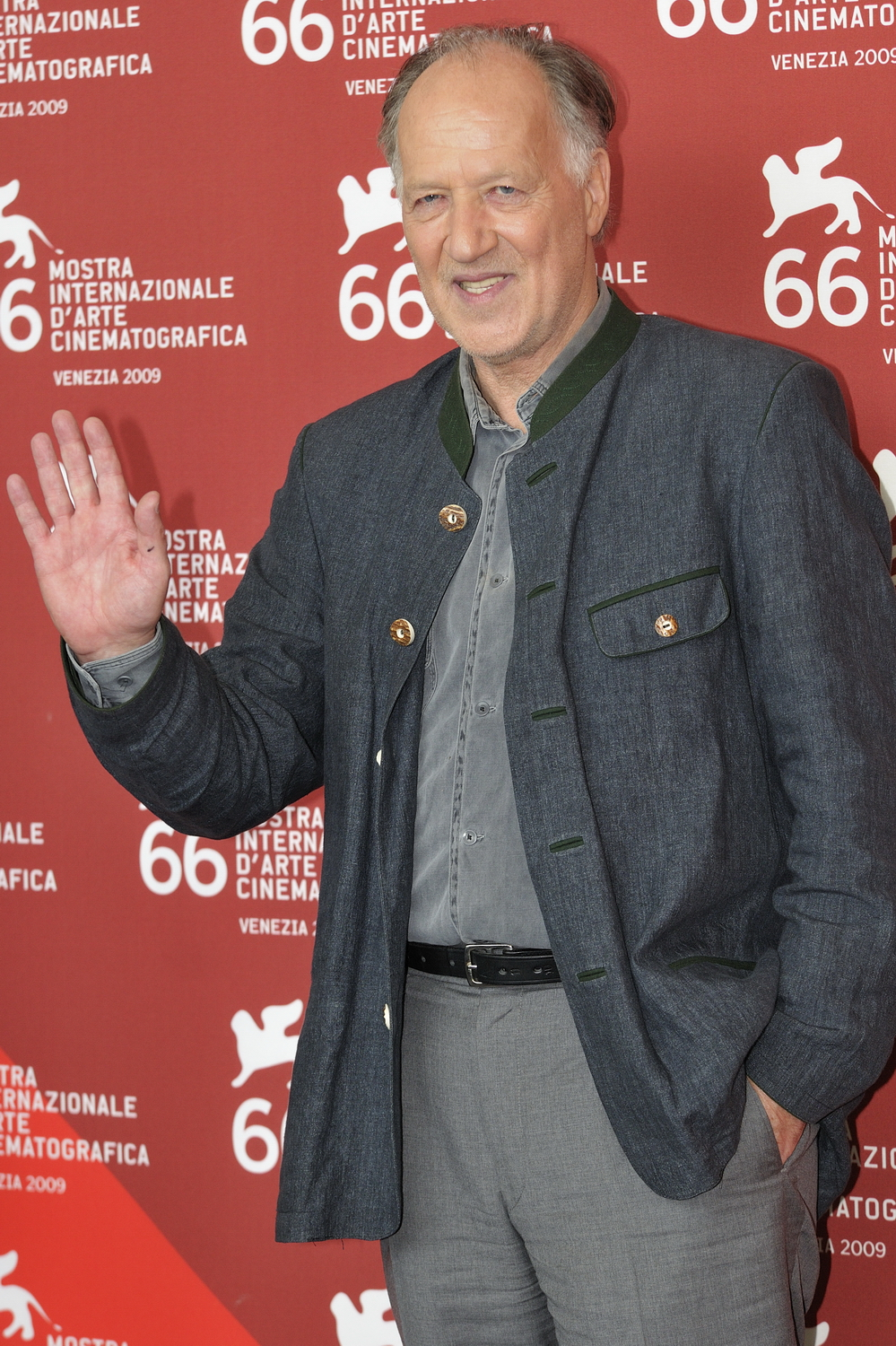
Herzog at the 66th Venice International Film Festival in 2009

=== As director ===
Year	Title	Director	Writer	Producer	Note	Ref.
1968	Signs of Life	Yes	Yes	Yes		
1970	Even Dwarfs Started Small	Yes	Yes	Yes	Also Music Arranger	
1972	Aguirre, the Wrath of God	Yes	Yes	Yes		
1974	The Enigma of Kaspar Hauser	Yes	Yes	Yes	Also Additional Cinematographer	
1976	Heart of Glass	Yes	Yes	Yes		
1977	Stroszek	Yes	Yes	Yes		
1979	Nosferatu the Vampyre	Yes	Yes	Yes		
1979	Woyzeck	Yes	Yes	Yes		
1982	Fitzcarraldo	Yes	Yes	Yes		
1984	Where the Green Ants Dream	Yes	Yes	No		
1987	Cobra Verde	Yes	Yes	No		
1991	Scream of Stone	Yes	No	No		
2001	Invincible	Yes	Yes	No		
2005	The Wild Blue Yonder	Yes	Yes	No		
2006	Rescue Dawn	Yes	Yes	No		
2009	Bad Lieutenant: Port of Call New Orleans	Yes	No	No		
2009	My Son, My Son, What Have Ye Done	Yes	Yes	No		
2015	Queen of the Desert	Yes	Yes	No		
2016	Salt and Fire	Yes	Yes	No		
2019	Family Romance, LLC	Yes	Yes	No	Also Camera Operator, and Cinematographer	
2026	Bucking Fastard	Yes	Yes	No		

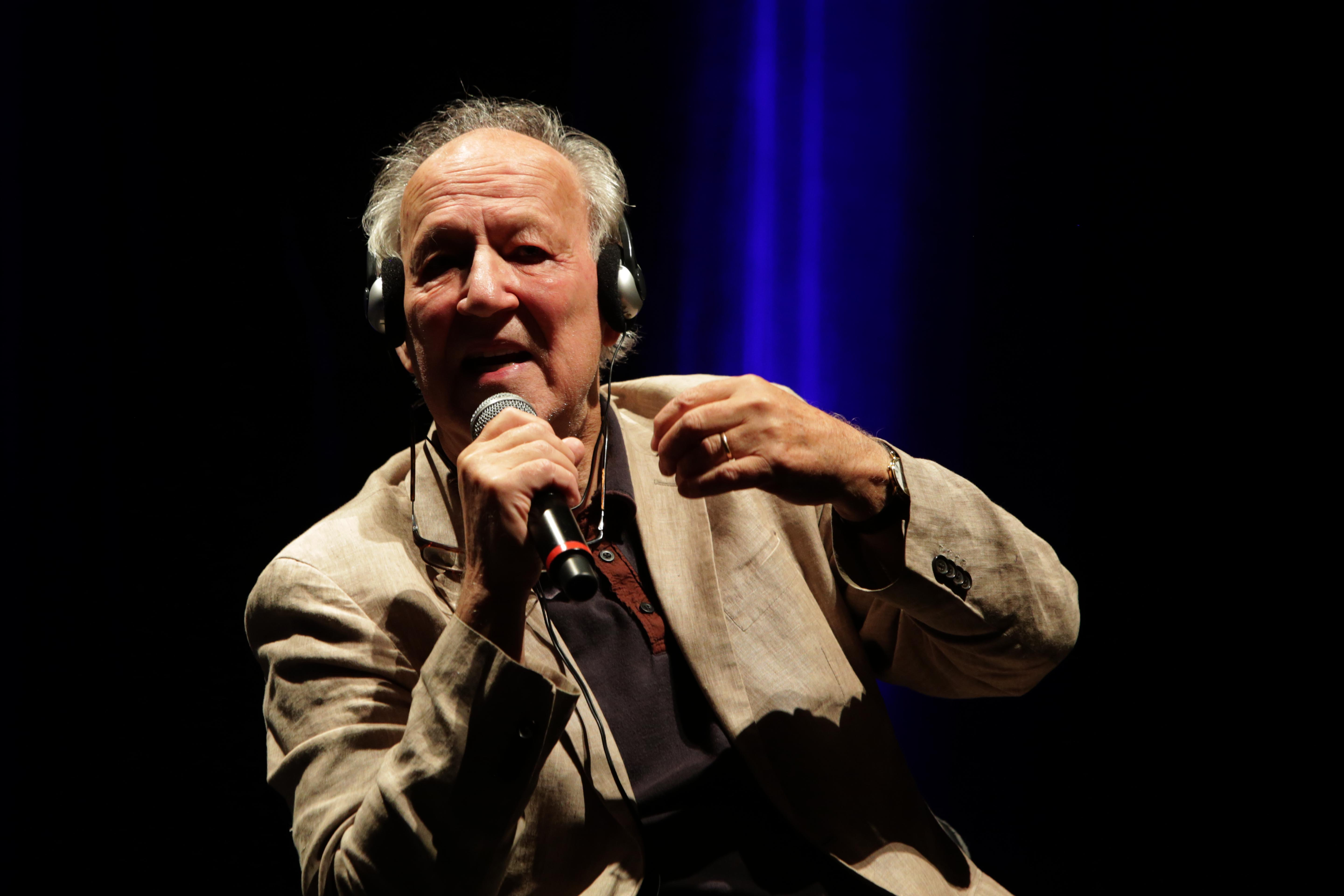
Herzog speaking in São Paulo in 2019

=== Acting roles ===
Year	Title	Role	Notes	Ref.
1971	Geschichten vom Kübelkind	Hurenmörder		
1983	Man of Flowers	Father		
1989	Bride of the Orient			
1989	Hard to Be a God	Mita/Richard		
1998	What Dreams May Come	Chris's father		
1999	Julien Donkey-Boy	Father		
2007	Mister Lonely	Father Umbrillo		
2007	The Grand	The German		
2012	Jack Reacher	Zek Chelovek		
2013	The Wind Rises	Castorp	Voice; English dub	
2013	Home from Home	Alexander von Humboldt		
2014	Penguins of Madagascar	Documentary filmmaker	Voice	
2024	Orion and the Dark	Narrator	Voice	
2027	Ally	TBA	Voice	

=== Short films ===
Year	Title	Director	Writer	Producer	Editor	Sound	Ref.
1962	Herakles	Yes	Yes	Yes	Yes	Yes	
1964	Game in the Sand	Yes	Yes	Yes	Yes	No	
1966	The Unprecedented Defence of the Fortress Deutschkreuz	Yes	Yes	No	Yes	No	
1968	Last Words	Yes	Yes	Yes	No	No	
1969	Precautions Against Fanatics	Yes	Yes	Yes	No	Yes	
1976	No One Will Play with Me	Yes	Yes	Yes	No	No	
1988	Les Gaulois	Yes	No	No	No	No	
2009	Plastic Bag	No	No	Yes	No	No	

== Documentary films ==
=== As director ===
Year	Title	Director	Writer	Narrator	Producer	Notes	Ref.
1969	The Flying Doctors of East Africa	Yes	Yes	No	No		
1971	Handicapped Future	Yes	Yes	No	Yes		
1971	Land of Silence and Darkness	Yes	Yes	No	Yes		
1971	Fata Morgana	Yes	Yes	No	No		
1974	The Great Ecstasy of Woodcarver Steiner	Yes	Yes	Yes	No		
1976	How Much Wood Would a Woodchuck Chuck	Yes	Yes	Yes	Yes		
1981	Huie's Sermon	Yes	No	No	Yes		
1981	God's Angry Man	Yes	Yes	Yes	Yes		
1984	Ballad of the Little Soldier	Yes	Yes	Yes	Yes		
1985	The Dark Glow of the Mountains	Yes	Yes	Yes	Yes		
1989	Herdsmen of the Sun	Yes	No	Yes	No		
1990	Echoes from a Sombre Empire	Yes	Yes	Yes	Yes		
1991	Jag Mandir	Yes	Yes	Yes	Yes		
1992	Lessons of Darkness	Yes	Yes	Yes	Yes		
1993	Bells from the Deep	Yes	Yes	Yes	No		
1994	The Transformation of the World into Music	Yes	No	No	No		
1995	Gesualdo: Death for Five Voices	Yes	Yes	Yes	No		
1997	Little Dieter Needs to Fly	Yes	Yes	Yes	No		
1998	Wings of Hope	Yes	No	Yes	No		
1999	My Best Fiend	Yes	Yes	Yes	No		
2003	Wheel of Time	Yes	Yes	Yes	No		
2004	The White Diamond	Yes	Yes	Yes	No		
2005	Grizzly Man	Yes	Yes	Yes	No		
2007	Encounters at the End of the World	Yes	Yes	Yes	No	Also sound	
2010	Cave of Forgotten Dreams	Yes	Yes	Yes	No		
2010	Happy People: A Year in the Taiga	Yes	Yes	Yes	Yes	Co-directed with Dmitry Vasyukov	
2011	Into the Abyss	Yes	Yes	Yes	No		
2012	The Killers Unstaged	Yes	No	No	No		
2016	Lo and Behold, Reveries of the Connected World	Yes	Yes	Yes	Yes		
2016	Into the Inferno	Yes	Yes	Yes	No		
2018	Meeting Gorbachev	Yes	Yes	Yes	No	Co-directed with André Singer	
2019	Nomad: In the Footsteps of Bruce Chatwin	Yes	Yes	Yes	No		
2020	Fireball: Visitors from Darker Worlds	Yes	Yes	Yes	No	Co-directed with Clive Oppenheimer	
2022	The Fire Within: Requiem for Katia and Maurice Krafft	Yes	Yes	Yes	No		
2022	Theatre of Thought	Yes	Yes	Yes	No		
2025	Ghost Elephants	Yes	Yes	Yes	No		

=== Producer only ===
- The Act of Killing (2012)
- The Look of Silence (2014)
- Red Army (2014)
- A Gray State (2017)

Ref.:

=== Appearances as himself ===
- Garlic Is as Good as Ten Mothers (1980)
- Burden of Dreams (1982)
- The South Bank Show (1982) Series 5, Episode 25
- Room 666 (1982)
- Tokyo-Ga (1985)
- Incident at Loch Ness (2004)
- All in This Tea (2007)
- Life Itself (2014)

Ref.:

=== As narrator ===
- La Soufrière (1977)
- Portrait Werner Herzog (1982)
- Ten Thousand Years Older (2002)
- Dinotasia (2012)

=== Short films ===
Year	Title	Director	Writer	Producer	Ref.
1977	La Soufrière	Yes	Yes	Yes	
1980	Werner Herzog Eats His Shoe	No	Yes	No	
1986	Portrait Werner Herzog	Yes	Yes	Yes	
2001	Pilgrimage	Yes	No	No	
2002	Ten Thousand Years Older	Yes	No	No	
2009	La Bohème	Yes	No	No	
2011	Ode to the Dawn of Man	Yes	No	No	
2013	From One Second to the Next	Yes	No	No	

== Television ==
=== As director ===
Year	Title	Director	Narrator	Notes	Ref.
1991–1992	Filmstunde	Yes	Yes	Series of interviews conducted by Herzog	
1999	2000 Years of Christianity	Yes	No	Episode 9 "Christ and Demons in New Spain"	
2012–2013	On Death Row	Yes	Yes	8 episodes	

=== Producer only ===
- Last Exit: Space (2022)

=== Acting roles ===
Year	Title	Role	Notes	Ref.
2010	The Boondocks	Himself	Voice; Episode: "It's a Black President, Huey Freeman"	
2011, 2019, 2020, 2021	The Simpsons	Walter Hotenhoffer, Dr. Lund and The Amazing Herzog	Voice; Episodes: "The Scorpion's Tale", "Crystal Blue-Haired Persuasion", "Screenless" and "Mother and Child Reunion"	
2012	American Dad!	Himself	Voice; Episode: "Ricky Spanish"	
2012	Metalocalypse	Ishnifus Meaddle	Voice; 9 episodes	
2015	Parks and Recreation	Keg Jeggings	Episode: "2017"	
2015	Rick and Morty	Shrimply Pibbles	Voice; Episode: "Interdimensional Cable 2: Tempting Fate"	
2019	The Mandalorian	The Client	Episodes: "Chapter 1: The Mandalorian", "Chapter 3: The Sin" and "Chapter 7: The Reckoning"	
2022	The U.S. and the Holocaust	Hermann Göring	Voice, 1 episode	
2024–present	Conan O'Brien Must Go	Narrator	Voice	
