= List of film director and cinematographer collaborations =

The following is a list of notable film director and cinematographer collaborations. It is ordered by film director.

Films for which the cinematographer won the Academy Award are in bold.

== A ==
J. J. Abrams

- Dan Mindel
  - Mission: Impossible III (2006)
  - Star Trek (2009)
  - Star Trek Into Darkness (2013)
  - Star Wars: The Force Awakens (2015)
  - Star Wars: The Rise of Skywalker (2019)

Robert Aldrich

- Joseph Biroc
  - World for Ransom (1954)
  - Attack (1956)
  - The Garment Jungle (1957)
  - Hush...Hush, Sweet Charlotte (1964, Academy Award nomination)
  - The Flight of the Phoenix (1965)
  - The Legend of Lylah Clare (1968)
  - The Killing of Sister George (1968)
  - The Greatest Mother of Them All (1969)
  - Too Late the Hero (1970)
  - The Grissom Gang (1971)
  - Ulzana's Raid (1972)
  - Emperor of the North Pole (1973)
  - The Longest Yard (1974)
  - Hustle (1975)
  - The Choirboys (1977)
  - ...All the Marbles (1981)
- Ernest Laszlo
  - Apache (1954)
  - Vera Cruz (1954)
  - Kiss Me Deadly (1955)
  - The Big Knife (1955)
  - Ten Seconds to Hell (1959)
  - The Last Sunset (1961)
  - 4 for Texas (1963)

Woody Allen

- Carlo Di Palma
  - Hannah and Her Sisters (1986)
  - Radio Days (1987)
  - September (1987)
  - Alice (1990)
  - Shadows and Fog (1992)
  - Husbands and Wives (1992)
  - Manhattan Murder Mystery (1993)
  - Bullets Over Broadway (1994)
  - Don't Drink the Water (1994) — made for TV
  - Mighty Aphrodite (1995)
  - Everyone Says I Love You (1996)
  - Deconstructing Harry (1997)
- Darius Khondji
  - Anything Else (2003)
  - Midnight in Paris (2011)
  - To Rome With Love (2012)
  - Magic in the Moonlight (2014)
  - Irrational Man (2015)
- Sven Nykvist
  - Another Woman (1988)
  - Crimes and Misdemeanors (1989)
  - Oedipus Wrecks (1989)
  - Celebrity (1998)
- Vittorio Storaro
  - Cafe Society (2016)
  - Wonder Wheel (2017)
  - A Rainy Day in New York (2019)
  - Rifkin's Festival (2021)
  - Coup de Chance (2022)
- Gordon Willis
  - Annie Hall (1977)
  - Interiors (1978)
  - Manhattan (1979)
  - Stardust Memories (1980)
  - A Midsummer Night's Sex Comedy (1982)
  - Zelig (1983, Academy Award nomination)
  - Broadway Danny Rose (1984)
  - The Purple Rose of Cairo (1985)

Pedro Almodóvar

- José Luis Alcaine
  - Mujeres al borde de un ataque de nervios (Women on the Verge of a Nervous Breakdown) (1988)
  - ¡Átame! (Tie Me Up! Tie Me Down!) (1990)
  - La Mala Educación (Bad Education) (2004)
  - Volver (2006)
  - La piel que habito (The Skin I Live In) (2011)
  - Los amantes pasajeros (I'm So Excited) (2013)
  - Dolor y gloria (Pain and Glory) (2019)
  - La voz humana (The Human Voice) (2020)
  - Madres paralelas (Parallel Mothers) (2021)
  - Extraña forma de vida (Strange Way of Life) (2023)

Robert Altman

- Pierre Mignot
  - Come Back to the 5 & Dime, Jimmy Dean, Jimmy Dean (1982)
  - Streamers (1983)
  - Secret Honor (1984)
  - O.C. and Stiggs (1984, released in 1987)
  - Fool for Love (1985)
  - Beyond Therapy (1987)
  - Prêt-à-Porter (1994), with Jean Lépine
- Vilmos Zsigmond
  - McCabe & Mrs. Miller (1971)
  - Images (1972)
  - The Long Goodbye (1973)

Paul Thomas Anderson

- Robert Elswit
  - Hard Eight (also known as Sydney) (1996)
  - Boogie Nights (1997)
  - Magnolia (1999)
  - Punch-Drunk Love (2002)
  - There Will Be Blood (2007, Academy Award)
  - Inherent Vice (2014)

Wes Anderson

- Robert Yeoman
  - Bottle Rocket (1996)
  - Rushmore (1998)
  - The Royal Tenenbaums (2001)
  - Life Aquatic with Steve Zissou (2004)
  - The Darjeeling Limited (2007)
  - Moonrise Kingdom (2012)
  - The Grand Budapest Hotel (2014, Academy Award nomination)
  - The French Dispatch (2021)
  - Asteroid City (2023)

Michael Apted

- Maryse Alberti
  - Incident at Oglala (1992)
  - Moving the Mountain (1994)
  - Inspirations (1997) (with cinematographer Amnon Zlayet)
  - Me & Isaac Newton (1999)
  - The Power of the Game (2007)
- Ralf D. Bode
  - Coal Miner's Daughter (1980)
  - Gorky Park (1983)
  - Firstborn (1984)
  - Bring on the Night (1985)
  - Critical Condition (1987)

Darren Aronofsky

- Matthew Libatique
  - Pi (1998)
  - Requiem for a Dream (2000)
  - The Fountain (2006)
  - **Black Swan** (2010, Academy Award)
  - Noah (2014)
  - Mother! (2017)
  - The Whale (2022)
  - Caught Stealing (2025)

John G. Avildsen

- Ralf D. Bode
  - The Stoolie (1972) with Avildsen as co-cinematographer
  - Fore Play (segment: "Inaugural Ball") (1975)
  - Slow Dancing in the Big City (1978)
- James Crabe
  - Save the Tiger (1973)
  - W.W. and the Dixie Dancekings (1975)
  - Rocky (1976)
  - The Formula (1980, Academy Award nomination)
  - The Karate Kid (1984)
  - The Karate Kid Part II (1986)
  - Happy New Year (1987)
  - For Keeps (1988)

== B ==
Charles Band

- Mac Ahlberg
  - Parasite (1982)
  - Metalstorm: The Destruction of Jared-Syn (1983)
  - The Dungeonmaster (1984) – Segment: "Heavy Metal"
  - Trancers (1984)
  - Pulse Pounders (1988) – Segments: "The Evil Clergyman", "Trancers: City of Lost Angels" and "Dungeonmaster 2"
  - Meridian (1990)
  - Crash and Burn (1990)
  - Puppet Master: The Legacy (2003)
  - Evil Bong (2006)
  - Cutter's Club (2025)

Warren Beatty

- Vittorio Storaro
  - **Reds** (1981, Academy Award)
  - Dick Tracy (1990)
  - Bulworth (1998)

Ingmar Bergman

- Gunnar Fischer
  - Port of Call (1948)
  - Thirst (1949)
  - This Can't Happen Here (1950)
  - To Joy (1950)
  - Summer Interlude (1951)
  - Secrets of Women (1952)
  - Summer with Monika (1953)
  - Smiles of a Summer Night (1955)
  - The Seventh Seal (1957)
  - Wild Strawberries (1957)
  - The Magician (1958)
  - The Devil's Eye (1960)
- Sven Nykvist
  - Sawdust and Tinsel (1953) – also with Hilding Bladh
  - The Virgin Spring (1960)
  - Through a Glass Darkly (1961)
  - The Silence (1963)
  - Winter Light (1963)
  - All These Women (1964)
  - Persona (1966)
  - Shame (1968)
  - Hour of the Wolf (1968)
  - The Rite (1969) – made for TV
  - The Passion of Anna (1969)
  - The Touch (1971)
  - **Cries and Whispers** (1973, Academy Award)
  - Scenes from a Marriage (1973)
  - The Magic Flute (1975)
  - Face to Face (1976)
  - The Serpent's Egg (1977)
  - Autumn Sonata (1978)
  - From the Life of the Marionettes (1980)
  - **Fanny and Alexander** (1982, Academy Award)
  - After the Rehearsal (1984) – made for TV

Bruce Beresford

- Peter James
  - Driving Miss Daisy (1989)
  - Mister Johnson (1990)
  - Black Robe (1991)
  - Rich in Love (1992)
  - Silent Fall (1994)
  - Last Dance (1996)
  - Paradise Road (1997)
  - Double Jeopardy (1999)
  - Bride of the Wind (2001)
  - And Starring Pancho Villa as Himself (2003, miniseries)
  - Mao's Last Dancer (2009)
  - Ladies in Black (2018)
- Donald McAlpine
  - The Adventures of Barry McKenzie (1972)
  - Barry McKenzie Holds His Own (1974)
  - Don's Party (1976)
  - The Getting of Wisdom (1977)
  - Money Movers (1978)
  - Breaker Morant (1980)
  - The Club (1980)
  - Puberty Blues (1981)
  - King David (1985)
  - The Fringe Dwellers (1986)

Bernardo Bertolucci

- Vittorio Storaro
  - The Spider's Stratagem (1970)
  - The Conformist (1970)
  - Last Tango in Paris (1973)
  - 1900 (1976)
  - Luna (1979)
  - **The Last Emperor** (1987, Academy Award)
  - The Sheltering Sky (1990)
  - Little Buddha (1993)

Matt Bettinelli-Olpin and Tyler Gillett

- Brett Jutkiewicz
  - Ready or Not (2019)
  - Scream (2022)
  - Scream VI (2023)
  - Ready or Not 2: Here I Come (2026)
  - The Mummy: Book of the Dead (2027)

Kenneth Branagh

- Roger Lanser
  - Peter's Friends (1992)
  - Much Ado About Nothing (1993)
  - In the Bleak Midwinter (1995)
  - The Magic Flute (2006)
  - As You Like It (2006)
- Haris Zambarloukos
  - Sleuth (2007)
  - Thor (2011)
  - Jack Ryan: Shadow Recruit (2014)
  - Cinderella (2015)
  - Murder on the Orient Express (2017)
  - Artemis Fowl (2020)
  - Belfast (2021)
  - Death on the Nile (2022)

Danny Boyle

- Anthony Dod Mantle
  - 28 Days Later (2002)
  - Millions (2004)
  - **Slumdog Millionaire** (2008, Academy Award)
  - 127 Hours (2010)
  - Trance (2013)
  - T2 Trainspotting (2017)
  - 28 Years Later (2025)

Tim Burton

- Stefan Czapsky
  - Edward Scissorhands (1990)
  - Batman Returns (1992)
  - Ed Wood (1994)
- Bruno Delbonnel
  - Dark Shadows (2012)
  - Big Eyes (2014)
  - Miss Peregrine's Home for Peculiar Children (2016)
- Philippe Rousselot
  - Planet of the Apes (2001)
  - Big Fish (2003)
  - Charlie and the Chocolate Factory (2005)

== C ==
Martin Campbell

- Phil Méheux
  - Criminal Law (1988)
  - Defenseless (1991)
  - No Escape (1994)
  - GoldenEye (1995)
  - The Mask of Zorro (1998)
  - Beyond Borders (2003)
  - The Legend of Zorro (2005)
  - Casino Royale (2006)
  - Edge of Darkness (2010)
- David Tattersall
  - Vertical Limit (2000)
  - The Foreigner (2017)
  - The Protégé (2021)
  - Memory (2022)
  - Dirty Angels (2024)

James Cameron

- Russell Carpenter
  - True Lies (1994)
  - **Titanic** (1997, Academy Award)
  - Avatar: The Way of Water (2022)
  - Avatar: Fire and Ash (2025)

Frank Capra

- Joseph Walker
  - Flight (1929), with Elmer Dyer and Paul Perry
  - Ladies of Leisure (1930)
  - Rain or Shine (1930)
  - Dirigible (1931)
  - The Miracle Woman (1931)
  - Platinum Blonde (1931)
  - Forbidden (1932)
  - American Madness (1932)
  - The Bitter Tea of General Yen (1933)
  - Lady for a Day (1933)
  - It Happened One Night (1934)
  - Broadway Bill (1934)
  - Mr. Deeds Goes to Town (1936)
  - Lost Horizon (1937), with Elmer Dyer
  - You Can't Take It with You (1938, Academy Award nomination)
  - Mr. Smith Goes to Washington (1939)
  - It's a Wonderful Life (1946), with Joseph Biroc and Victor Milner

John Carpenter

- Gary B. Kibbe
  - Prince of Darkness (1987)
  - They Live (1988)
  - Body Bags (1993) (made-for-TV) (segments: "The Gas Station" and "Hair")
  - In the Mouth of Madness (1994)
  - Village of the Damned (1995)
  - Escape from L.A. (1996)
  - Vampires (1998)
  - Ghosts of Mars (2001)
- Dean Cundey
  - Halloween (1978)
  - The Fog (1980)
  - Escape from New York (1981)
  - The Thing (1982)
  - Big Trouble in Little China (1986)

Claude Chabrol

- Jean Rabier
  - Le Beau Serge (Handsome Serge / Bitter Reunion) (1958) — also with Henri Decaë
  - Les Godelureaux (Wise Guys) (1961)
  - Les Sept Péchés capitaux (The Seven Deadly Sins) (segment "L'Avarice") (1962)
  - L'Œil du Malin (The Eye of Evil) (1962)
  - Landru (Bluebeard) (1963)
  - Ophélia (1963)
  - Les Plus Belles Escroqueries du monde (The World's Most Beautiful Swindlers) (segment "L'Homme qui vendit la tour Eiffel") (1964)
  - Le Tigre aime la chair fraîche (Code Name: Tiger / The Tiger Likes Fresh Meat) (1964)
  - Paris vu par... (Six in Paris) (segment "La Muette") (1965)
  - Marie-Chantal contre le docteur Kha (Marie-Chantal vs. Doctor Kha) (1965)
  - Le Tigre se parfume à la dynamite (An Orchid for the Tiger / Our Agent Tiger) (1965)
  - La Ligne de démarcation (Line of Demarcation) (1966)
  - Le Scandale (The Champagne Murders) (1967)
  - La Route de Corinthe (The Road to Corinth) (1967)
  - Les Biches (The Does / Bad Girls / Girlfriends) (1968)
  - La Femme infidèle (The Unfaithful Wife) (1969)
  - Que la bête meure (This Man Must Die) (1969)
  - Le Boucher (The Butcher) (1970)
  - La Rupture (The Breach / Hallucination / The Breakup) (1970)
  - Juste avant la nuit (Just Before Nightfall) (1971)
  - La Décade prodigieuse (Ten Days' Wonder) (1971)
  - Docteur Popaul (Scroundel in White / High Heels / Play Now, Play Later) (1972)
  - Les Noces rouges (Wedding in Blood) (1973)
  - Nada (The Nada Gang) (1974)
  - Une partie de plaisir (A Piece of Pleasure / Pleasure Party) (1975)
  - Les Innocents aux mains sales (Dirty Hands / Innocents with Dirty Hands) (1975)
  - Les Magiciens (Death Rite) (1976)
  - Folies bourgeoises (The Twist) (1976)
  - Alice ou la dernière fugue (Alice / Alice or The Last Escapade) (1977)
  - Les Liens de sang (Blood Relatives) (1978)
  - Violette Nozière (Violette) (1978)
  - Le Cheval d'orgueil (The Proud Ones / The Horse of Pride) (1980)
  - Les Fantômes du chapelier (The Hatter's Ghost) (1982)
  - Poulet au vinaigre (Chicken with Vinegar) (1985)
  - Inspecteur Lavardin (1986)
  - Masques (Masks) (1987)
  - Le Cri du hibou (The Cry of the Owl) (1987)
  - Une affaire de femmes (Story of Women) (1988)
  - Jours tranquilles à Clichy (Quiet Days in Clichy) (1990)
  - Dr. M (1990)
  - Madame Bovary (1991)
- Eduardo Serra
  - Rien ne va plus (The Swindle) (1997)
  - Au cœur du mensonge (The Color of Lies) (1999)
  - La Fleur du Mal (The Flower of Evil) (2003)
  - La Demoiselle d'honneur (The Bridesmaid) (2004)
  - L'Ivresse du pouvoir (A Comedy of Power) (2006)
  - La Fille coupée en deux (A Girl Cut in Two) (2007)
  - Bellamy (2009)

Charlie Chaplin

- Roland Totheroh
  - The Floorwalker (1916 short) (with William C. Foster)
  - The Fireman (1916 short) (with William C. Foster)
  - The Vagabond (1916 short) (with William C. Foster)
  - One A.M. (1916 short) (with William C. Foster)
  - The Count (1916 short) (with George C. Zalibra)
  - The Pawnshop (1916 short) (with William C. Foster)
  - Behind the Screen (1916 short) (with George C. Zalibra)
  - The Rink (1916 short) (with George C. Zalibra)
  - Easy Street (1917 short) (with George C. Zalibra)
  - The Cure (1917 short) (with George C. Zalibra)
  - The Immigrant (1917 short) (with George C. Zalibra)
  - The Adventurer (1917 short) (with George C. Zalibra)
  - A Dog's Life (1918 short)
  - Shoulder Arms (1918 short)
  - Sunnyside (1919 short)
  - The Professor (1919 unfinished short)
  - A Day's Pleasure (1919 short)
  - The Kid (1921)
  - The Idle Class (1921 short)
  - Pay Day (1922 short)
  - A Woman of Paris (1923) (with Jack Wilson)
  - The Gold Rush (1925)
  - The Circus (1928)
  - City Lights (1931) (with Gordon Pollock)
  - Modern Times (1936) (with Ira H. Morgan)
  - The Great Dictator (1940) (with Karl Struss)
  - Monsieur Verdoux (1947) (with an uncredited Curt Courant)
  - Limelight (1952) (credited to Karl Struss; "photographic consultant" only)

Coen brothers

- Roger Deakins
  - Barton Fink (1991)
  - The Hudsucker Proxy (1994)
  - Fargo (1996, Academy Award nomination)
  - The Big Lebowski (1998)
  - O Brother, Where Art Thou? (2000, Academy Award nomination)
  - The Man Who Wasn't There (2001, Academy Award nomination)
  - Intolerable Cruelty (2003)
  - The Ladykillers (2004)
  - No Country for Old Men (2007, Academy Award nomination)
  - A Serious Man (2009)
  - True Grit (2010, Academy Award nomination)
  - Hail, Caesar! (2016)
- Bruno Delbonnel
  - Paris, je t'aime (segment "Tuileries") (2006)
  - Inside Llewyn Davis (2013, Academy Award nomination)
  - The Ballad of Buster Scruggs (2018, miniseries)
  - The Tragedy of Macbeth (2021, Academy Award nomination)
  - Jack of Spades (2026)
- Barry Sonnenfeld
  - Blood Simple (1984)
  - Raising Arizona (1987)
  - Miller's Crossing (1990)

Francis Ford Coppola

- Vittorio Storaro
  - **Apocalypse Now** (1979, Academy Award)
  - One from the Heart (1982)
  - Tucker: The Man and His Dream (1988)
  - New York Stories (segment "Life Without Zoë") (1989)
- Gordon Willis
  - The Godfather (1972)
  - The Godfather Part II (1974)
  - The Godfather Part III (1990, Academy Award nomination)
- Mihai Malaimare Jr.
  - Youth Without Youth (2007)
  - Tetro (2009)
  - Twixt (2011)
  - Megalopolis (2024)

David Cronenberg

- Mark Irwin
  - Fast Company (1979)
  - The Brood (1979)
  - Scanners (1981)
  - Videodrome (1983)
  - The Dead Zone (1983)
  - The Fly (1986)
- Peter Suschitzky
  - Dead Ringers (1988)
  - Naked Lunch (1990)
  - M. Butterfly (1993)
  - Crash (1996)
  - eXistenZ (1999)
  - Spider (2002)
  - A History of Violence (2005)
  - Eastern Promises (2007)
  - A Dangerous Method (2011)
  - Cosmopolis (2012)
  - Maps to the Stars (2014)

Alfonso Cuarón

- Emmanuel Lubezki
  - Sólo con tu pareja (1991)
  - A Little Princess (1995, Academy Award nomination)
  - Great Expectations (1998)
  - Y tu mamá también (2001)
  - Children of Men (2006, Academy Award nomination)
  - **Gravity** (2013, Academy Award) – with Michael Seresin
- Michael Seresin
  - Harry Potter and the Prisoner of Azkaban (2004)
  - Paris, je t'aime (2006) Segment: "Parc Monceau"
  - Gravity (2013, Academy Award) — also with Emmanuel Lubezki

== D ==
Joe Dante

- John Hora
  - The Howling (1981)
  - Twilight Zone: The Movie (segment "It's a Good Life") (1983)
  - Gremlins (1984)
  - Explorers (1985)
  - Gremlins 2: The New Batch (1990)
  - Matinee (1993)
- Jamie Anderson
  - Hollywood Boulevard (1976)
  - Piranha (1978)
  - Small Soldiers (1998)

Dardenne brothers

- Alain Marcoen
  - La Promesse (The Promise) (1996)
  - Rosetta (1999)
  - Le Fils (The Son) (2002)
  - L'Enfant (The Child) (2005)
  - Chacun son cinéma (To Each His Own Cinema) (segment "Dans l'obscurité") (2007)
  - Le Silence de Lorna (Lorna's Silence) (2008)
  - Le Gamin au vélo (The Kid with a Bike) (2011)
  - Two Days, One Night (2014)

Brian De Palma

- Stephen H. Burum
  - Body Double (1984)
  - The Untouchables (1987)
  - Raising Cain (1992)
  - Carlito's Way (1993)
  - Mission: Impossible (1996)
  - Snake Eyes (1998)
  - Mission to Mars (2000)
- Vilmos Zsigmond
  - Obsession (1976)
  - Blow Out (1981)
  - The Bonfire of the Vanities (1990)
  - The Black Dahlia (2006)

Guillermo del Toro

- Guillermo Navarro
  - Cronos (1993)
  - The Devil's Backbone (2001)
  - Hellboy (2004)
  - Pan's Labyrinth (2006)
  - Hellboy II: The Golden Army (2008)
  - Pacific Rim (2013)
- Dan Laustsen
  - Mimic (1997)
  - Crimson Peak (2015)
  - The Shape of Water (2017, Academy Award nomination)
  - Nightmare Alley (2021, Academy Award nomination)
  - Frankenstein (2025, Academy Award nomination)

Claire Denis

- Agnès Godard
  - Jacques Rivette, le veilleur (Jacques Rivette, the Watchman) (1990), made for TV
  - J'ai pas sommeil (I Can't Sleep) (1994)
  - US Go Home (1994)
  - Nénette et Boni (Nenette and Boni) (1996)
  - Beau travail (Good Work) (1999)
  - Trouble Every Day (2001)
  - Ten Minutes Older: The Cello (segment "Vers Nancy") (2002)
  - Vendredi soir (Friday Night) (2002)
  - L'Intrus (The Intruder) (2004)
  - 35 rhums (35 Shots of Rum) (2008)

== E ==
Clint Eastwood

- Jack N. Green
  - Heartbreak Ridge (1986)
  - Bird (1988)
  - White Hunter Black Heart (1990)
  - The Rookie (1990)
  - Unforgiven (1992, Academy Award nomination)
  - A Perfect World (1993)
  - The Bridges of Madison County (1995)
  - Absolute Power (1997)
  - Midnight in the Garden of Good and Evil (1997)
  - True Crime (1999)
  - Space Cowboys (2000)
- Tom Stern
  - Blood Work (2002)
  - Mystic River (2003)
  - Million Dollar Baby (2004)
  - Flags of Our Fathers (2006)
  - Letters from Iwo Jima (2006)
  - Changeling (2008, Academy Award nomination)
  - Gran Torino (2008)
  - Invictus (2009)
  - Hereafter (2010)
  - J. Edgar (2011)
  - Jersey Boys (2014)
  - American Sniper (2014)
  - Sully (2016)
  - The 15:17 to Paris (2018)
- Bruce Surtees
  - Play Misty for Me (1971)
  - High Plains Drifter (1973)
  - The Outlaw Josey Wales (1976)
  - Firefox (1982)
  - Honkytonk Man (1982)
  - Sudden Impact (1983)
  - Pale Rider (1985)
- Yves Bélanger
  - The Mule (2018)
  - Richard Jewell (2019)
  - Juror No. 2 (2024)

Blake Edwards

- Dick Bush
  - Victor/Victoria (1982)
  - Trail of the Pink Panther (1982)
  - Curse of the Pink Panther (1983)
  - Switch (1991)
  - Son of the Pink Panther (1993)
- Philip H. Lathrop
  - The Perfect Furlough (1958)
  - Experiment in Terror (1962)
  - Days of Wine and Roses (1962)
  - The Pink Panther (1963)
  - What Did You Do in the War, Daddy? (1966)
  - Gunn (1967)
  - Wild Rovers (1971)
- Harry Stradling Jr.
  - S.O.B. (1981)
  - Micki & Maude (1984)
  - A Fine Mess (1986)
  - Blind Date (1987)

Robert Eggers

- Jarin Blaschke
  - The Witch (2015)
  - The Lighthouse (2019)
  - The Northman (2022)
  - Nosferatu (2024, Academy Award nomination)

Atom Egoyan

- Paul Sarossy
  - Speaking Parts (1989)
  - Montreal Stories (segment "In Passing") (1991)
  - The Adjuster (1991)
  - Exotica (1994)
  - The Sweet Hereafter (1997)
  - Felicia's Journey (1999)
  - The Line (2000)
  - Ararat (2002)
  - Where the Truth Lies (2005)
  - Adoration (2008)
  - Chloe (2009)
  - Devil's Knot (2013)
  - Remember (2015)

Sergei Eisenstein

- Eduard Tisse
  - Strike (1925)
  - The Battleship Potemkin (1925)
  - October: Ten Days That Shook the World (1928)
  - The Storming of La Sarraz (1929)
  - The General Line (1929)
  - Romance sentimentale (1930)
  - ¡Que viva México! (1931, released in 1979)
  - Bezhin Meadow (1937)
  - Alexander Nevsky (1938)
  - Ivan the Terrible, Part I (1944)
  - Ivan the Terrible, Part II (1946)
  - Ivan the Terrible, Part III (1948, unfinished)

== F ==
Rainer Werner Fassbinder

- Michael Ballhaus
  - Whity (1971)
  - Beware of a Holy Whore (1971)
  - The Bitter Tears of Petra von Kant (1972)
  - World on a Wire (1973)
  - Martha (1974)
  - Fox and His Friends (1975)
  - Mother Küsters' Trip to Heaven (1975)
  - Satan's Brew (1976)
  - Chinese Roulette (1976)
  - I Only Want You To Love Me (1976)
  - The Stationmaster's Wife (1977)
  - Germany in Autumn (1978)
  - Despair (1978)
  - The Marriage of Maria Braun (1979)
  - Lili Marleen (1981)
- Dietrich Lohmann
  - Love Is Colder Than Death (1969)
  - Katzelmacher (1969)
  - Gods of the Plague (1970)
  - Why Does Herr R. Run Amok? (1970)
  - The American Soldier (1970)
  - Rio das Mortes (1971)
  - The Merchant of Four Seasons (1971)
  - Eight Hours Don't Make a Day (1972)
  - Ali: Fear Eats the Soul (1974)
  - Effi Briest (1974)
- Xaver Schwarzenberger
  - Berlin Alexanderplatz (1980)
  - Lili Marleen (1981)
  - Lola (1981)
  - Veronika Voss (1982)
  - Querelle (1982)

Federico Fellini

- Otello Martelli
  - Variety Lights (1950)
  - I Vitelloni (1953)
  - La Strada (1954)
  - Il bidone (1955)
  - Nights of Cabiria (1957)
  - La Dolce Vita (1960)
  - Boccaccio '70 (segment "Le tentazioni del dottor Antonio") (1962)
- Giuseppe Rotunno
  - Spirits of the Dead (segment "Toby Dammit") (1968)
  - Fellini Satyricon (1969)
  - Roma (1972)
  - Amarcord (1973)
  - Fellini's Casanova (1976)
  - Orchestra Rehearsal (1978)
  - City of Women (1980)
  - And the Ship Sails On (1983)

Abel Ferrara

- Ken Kelsch
  - The Driller Killer (1979)
  - Bad Lieutenant (1992)
  - Dangerous Game (1954)
  - The Addiction (1995)
  - The Funeral (1996)
  - Subway Stories: Tales from the Underground (segment "Love on the A Train") (1997)
  - The Blackout (1997)
  - New Rose Hotel (1998)
  - 'R Xmas (2001)
  - Chelsea on the Rocks (2008)
  - 4:44 Last Day on Earth (2011)
  - Welcome to New York (2014)
  - The Projectionist (2019)

David Fincher

- Jeff Cronenweth
  - Fight Club (1999)
  - The Social Network (2010, Academy Award nomination)
  - The Girl with the Dragon Tattoo (2011, Academy Award nomination)
  - Gone Girl (2014)
- Darius Khondji
  - Se7en (1995)
  - Panic Room (2002) (with Conrad W. Hall)
- Erik Messerschmidt
  - Mank (2020, Academy Award)
  - The Killer (2023)
  - The Further Mis-Adventures of Cliff Booth (2026)

Richard Fleischer

- Jack Cardiff
  - The Vikings (1958)
  - The Prince and the Pauper (1977)
  - Conan the Destroyer (1984)
  - Million Dollar Mystery (1987)
- Richard H. Kline
  - The Boston Strangler (1968)
  - Soylent Green (1973)
  - The Don Is Dead (1973)
  - Mr. Majestyk (1974)
  - Mandingo (1975)

John Ford

- William H. Clothier
  - The Horse Soldiers (1959)
  - The Alamo (1960, Academy Award nomination)
  - The Man Who Shot Liberty Valance (1962)
  - Donovan's Reef (1963)
  - Cheyenne Autumn (1964, Academy Award nomination)
- Arthur Miller
  - Wee Willie Winkie (1937)
  - Submarine Patrol (1938)
  - Tobacco Road (1941)
  - **How Green Was My Valley** (1941, Academy Award)
- Winton C. Hoch
  - 3 Godfathers (1948)
  - **She Wore a Yellow Ribbon** (1949, Academy Award)
  - **The Quiet Man** (1952, Academy Award)
  - Mister Roberts (1955)
  - The Searchers (1956)

Miloš Forman

- Miroslav Ondříček
  - Loves of a Blonde (1965)
  - The Firemen's Ball (1967)
  - Taking Off (1971)
  - Hair (1979)
  - Ragtime (1981, Academy Award nomination)
  - Amadeus (1984, Academy Award nomination)
  - Valmont (1989)

Marc Forster

- Roberto Schaefer
  - Loungers (1995)
  - Everything Put Together (2000)
  - Monster's Ball (2001)
  - Finding Neverland (2003)
  - Stay (2005)
  - Stranger Than Fiction (2006)
  - Kite Runner (2007)
  - Quantum of Solace (2008)
  - Machine Gun Preacher (2011)

Stephen Frears

- Oliver Stapleton
  - My Beautiful Laundrette (1985)
  - Prick Up Your Ears (1987)
  - Sammy and Rosie Get Laid (1987)
  - The Grifters (1990)
  - Hero (1992)
  - The Snapper (1993, TV movie)
  - The Van (1996)
  - The Hi-Lo Country (1998)

== G ==
Terry Gilliam

- Nicola Pecorini
  - Fear and Loathing in Las Vegas (1998)
  - Tideland (2005)
  - The Imaginarium of Doctor Parnassus (2009)
  - The Zero Theorem (2013)
  - The Man Who Killed Don Quixote (2018)
- Roger Pratt
  - Brazil (1985)
  - The Fisher King (1991)
  - 12 Monkeys (1995)

Jean-Luc Godard

- Raoul Coutard
  - Breathless (1960)
  - The Little Soldier (1960)
  - A Woman Is a Woman (1961)
  - My Life to Live (1962)
  - The Carabineers (1963)
  - Contempt (1963)
  - Bande à part (1964)
  - A Married Woman (1964)
  - Alphaville (1965)
  - Pierrot le Fou (1965)
  - Made in U.S.A. (1966)
  - Two or Three Things I Know About Her (1967)
  - La Chinoise (1967)
  - Weekend (1967)
  - Passion (1982)
  - First Name: Carmen (1983) – with Jean-Bernard Menoud

D. W. Griffith

- Billy Bitzer (incomplete)
  - The Birth of a Nation (1915)
  - Intolerance (1916)
  - Broken Blossoms (1919)
  - Way Down East (1920)

== H ==
Lasse Hallström

- Oliver Stapleton
  - The Cider House Rules (1999)
  - The Shipping News (2001)
  - Casanova (2005)
  - An Unfinished Life (2005)
  - The Hoax (2006)
- Sven Nykvist
  - What's Eating Gilbert Grape (1993)
  - Something to Talk About (1995)

Michael Haneke

- Christian Berger
  - Benny's Video (1992)
  - 71 Fragments of a Chronology of Chance (1994)
  - The Piano Teacher (2001)
  - Caché (2005)
  - The White Ribbon (2009)
  - Happy End (2017)

Curtis Hanson

- Robert Elswit
  - Bad Influence (1990)
  - The Hand that Rocks the Cradle (1992)
  - The River Wild (1994)

Henry Hathaway

- Lucien Ballard
  - Diplomatic Courier (1952)
  - O. Henry's Full House (segment "The Clarion Call") (1952) with Milton Krasner
  - Prince Valiant (1954)
  - The Sons of Katie Elder (1965)
  - Nevada Smith (1966)
  - True Grit (1969)
- Leon Shamroy
  - Ten Gentlemen from West Point (1942, Academy Award nomination)
  - White Witch Doctor (1953)
  - North to Alaska (1960)
- Charles Lang
  - The Lives of a Bengal Lancer (1935)
  - Peter Ibbetson (1935)
  - Souls at Sea (1937)
  - Spawn of the North (1938)
  - The Shepherd of the Hills (1941)
  - Sundown (1941, Academy Award nomination)
  - How the West Was Won (segments "The Rivers" and "The Plains") (1962, Academy Award nomination)

Werner Herzog

- Thomas Mauch
  - Signs of Life (1968)
  - Even Dwarfs Started Small (1970)
  - The Flying Doctors of East Africa (1970)
  - Aguirre, the Wrath of God (1972)
  - How Much Wood Would a Woodchuck Chuck (1976)
  - Stroszek (1977)
  - Fitzcarraldo (1982)
  - God's Angry Man (1981)
  - Huie's Sermon (1981)
- Jörg Schmidt-Reitwein
  - Fata Morgana (1972)
  - The Enigma of Kaspar Hauser (1974)
  - Heart of Glass (1976)
  - Nosferatu the Vampyre (1979)
  - Woyzeck (1979)
  - Where the Green Ants Dream (1984)
  - Wodaabe – Herdsmen of the Sun (1989)
- Peter Zeitlinger
  - Gesualdo: Death for Five Voices (1995)
  - Little Dieter Needs to Fly (1997)
  - My Best Fiend (1999)
  - Wings of Hope (2000)
  - Invincible (2001)
  - Wheel of Time (2003)
  - Grizzly Man (2005)
  - Rescue Dawn (2006)
  - Encounters at the End of the World (2007)
  - The Bad Lieutenant: Port of Call New Orleans (2009)
  - My Son, My Son, What Have Ye Done? (2009)
  - Cave of Forgotten Dreams (2010)
  - Into the Abyss (2011)
  - From One Second to the Next (2013)
  - Queen of the Desert (2015)

Alfred Hitchcock

- Robert Burks
  - Strangers on a Train (1951, Academy Award nomination)
  - I Confess (1952)
  - Dial M for Murder (1954)
  - Rear Window (1954, Academy Award nomination)
  - **To Catch a Thief** (1955, Academy Award)
  - The Trouble with Harry (1955)
  - The Man Who Knew Too Much (1956)
  - The Wrong Man (1956)
  - Vertigo (1958)
  - North by Northwest (1959)
  - The Birds (1963)
  - Marnie (1964)
- Harry Stradling
  - Jamaica Inn (1939), with Bernard Knowles
  - Mr. & Mrs. Smith (1941)
  - Suspicion (1941)

Ron Howard

- Salvatore Totino
  - The Missing (2003)
  - Cinderella Man (2005)
  - The Da Vinci Code (2006)
  - Frost/Nixon (2008)
  - Angels & Demons (2009)
  - The Dilemma (2011)
  - Inferno (2016)
- Donald Peterman
  - Splash (1984)
  - Cocoon (1985)
  - Gung Ho (1986)
  - Dr. Seuss' How the Grinch Stole Christmas (2000)

John Huston

- Oswald Morris
  - Moulin Rouge (1952)
  - Beat the Devil (1953)
  - Moby Dick (1956)
  - Heaven Knows, Mr. Allison (1957)
  - The Roots of Heaven (1958)
  - The Mackintosh Man (1973)
  - The Man Who Would Be King (1975)

== I ==
Alejandro González Iñárritu

- Rodrigo Prieto
  - Amores perros (2000)
  - 21 Grams (2003)
  - Babel (2006)
  - Biutiful (2008)
- Emmanuel Lubezki
  - '**Birdman'** (2014, Academy Award)
  - '**The Revenant'** (2015, Academy Award)
  - Digger (2026)

== J ==
Peter Jackson

- Alun Bollinger
  - Heavenly Creatures (1994)
  - Forgotten Silver (1995) – with Gerry Vasbenter
  - The Frighteners (1996) – with John Blick
- Andrew Lesnie
  - **The Lord of the Rings: The Fellowship of the Ring** (2001, Academy Award)
  - The Lord of the Rings: The Two Towers (2002)
  - The Lord of the Rings: The Return of the King (2003)
  - King Kong (2005)
  - The Lovely Bones (2009)
  - The Hobbit: An Unexpected Journey (2012)
  - The Hobbit: The Desolation of Smaug (2013)
  - The Hobbit: The Battle of the Five Armies (2014)

Rian Johnson

- Steve Yedlin
  - Brick (2005)
  - The Brothers Bloom (2008)
  - Looper (2012)
  - Star Wars: The Last Jedi (2017)
  - Knives Out (2019)
  - Glass Onion: A Knives Out Mystery (2022)
  - Wake Up Dead Man (2025)

== K ==
Jonathan Kaplan

- Ralf D. Bode
  - The Accused (1988)
  - Love Field (1992)
  - Bad Girls (1994)

Lawrence Kasdan

- Owen Roizman
  - I Love You to Death (1990)
  - Grand Canyon (1991)
  - Wyatt Earp (1994)
  - French Kiss (1995)
- John Bailey
  - The Big Chill (1983)
  - Silverado (1985)
  - The Accidental Tourist (1988)

Elia Kazan

- Harry Stradling
  - The Sea of Grass (1947)
  - A Streetcar Named Desire (1951)
  - A Face in the Crowd (1957) — with Gayne Rescher
- Boris Kaufman
  - **On the Waterfront** (1954, Academy Award)
  - Baby Doll (1956, Academy Award nomination)
  - Splendor in the Grass (1961)

Krzysztof Kieślowski

- Sławomir Idziak
  - The Scar (1976)
  - Decalogue V (1988)
  - A Short Film About Killing (1988)
  - The Double Life of Véronique (1991)
  - Three Colors: Blue (1993)

Henry King

- Leon Shamroy
  - Little Old New York (1940)
  - A Yank in the R.A.F. (1941)
  - **The Black Swan** (1942, Academy Award)
  - **Wilson** (1944, Academy Award)
  - Prince of Foxes (1949, Academy Award nomination)
  - Twelve O'Clock High (1949)
  - David and Bathsheba (1951, Academy Award nomination)
  - Wait till the Sun Shines, Nellie (1952)
  - The Snows of Kilimanjaro (1952, Academy Award nomination)
  - King of the Khyber Rifles (1953)
  - Love Is a Many-Splendored Thing (1955, Academy Award nomination)
  - The Bravados (1958)
  - Beloved Infidel (1959)
  - Tender Is the Night (1962)

Stanley Kubrick

- John Alcott
  - 2001: A Space Odyssey (some segments) (1968)
  - A Clockwork Orange (1971)
  - **Barry Lyndon** (1975, Academy Award)
  - The Shining (1980)

Akira Kurosawa

- Asakazu Nakai
  - No Regrets for Our Youth (1946)
  - One Wonderful Sunday (1947)
  - Stray Dog (1949)
  - Ikiru (1952)
  - Seven Samurai (1954)
  - I Live in Fear (1955)
  - Throne of Blood (1957)
  - High and Low (1963) – with Takao Saito
  - Red Beard (1965)
  - Dersu Uzala (1975) – with Yuri Gantman, Fyodor Dobronravov
  - Kagemusha (1980) – with Takao Saito
  - Ran (1985) – with Masaharu Ueda and Takao Saito
- Takao Saito
  - Sanjuro (1961)
  - High and Low (1963) – with Asakazu Nakai
  - Dodes'ka-den (1970) – with Yasumichi Fukuzawa
  - Kagemusha (1980) --with Asakazu Nakai
  - Ran (1985, Academy Award nomination) – with Masaharu Ueda, Asakazu Nakai
  - Dreams (1990) – with Shôji Ueda
  - Rhapsody in August (1991) – with Shôji Ueda
  - Madadayo (1993) – with Shôji Ueda

== L ==
Walter Lang

- Leon Shamroy
  - Tin Pan Alley (1940)
  - Moon Over Miami (1941)
  - Greenwich Village (1944)
  - State Fair (1945)
  - Cheaper by the Dozen (1950)
  - On the Riviera (1951)
  - With a Song in My Heart (1952)
  - Call Me Madam (1953)
  - There's No Business Like Show Business (1954)
  - The King and I (1956, Academy Award nomination)
  - Desk Set (1957)
  - Snow White and the Three Stooges (1959)

John Landis

- Mac Ahlberg
  - Oscar (1991)
  - Black or White (1991) Michael Jackson music video
  - Innocent Blood (1992)
  - Beverly Hills Cop III (1994)
- Robert Paynter
  - An American Werewolf in London (1981)
  - Trading Places (1983)
  - Thriller (1983) Michael Jackson music video
  - Into the Night (1985)
  - Spies Like Us (1985)

Yorgos Lanthimos

- Thimios Bakatakis
  - Kinetta (2005)
  - Dogtooth (2009)
  - The Lobster (2015)
  - The Killing of a Sacred Deer (2017)
- Robbie Ryan
  - The Favourite (2018, Academy Award nomination)
  - Poor Things (2023, Academy Award nomination)
  - Kinds of Kindness (2024)
  - Bugonia (2025)

Francis Lawrence

- Jo Willems
  - The Hunger Games: Catching Fire (2013)
  - The Hunger Games: Mockingjay – Part 1 (2014)
  - The Hunger Games: Mockingjay – Part 2 (2015)
  - Red Sparrow (2018)
  - Slumberland (2022)
  - The Hunger Games: The Ballad of Songbirds & Snakes (2023)
  - The Long Walk (2025)
  - The Hunger Games: Sunrise on the Reaping (2026)

David Lean

- Freddie Young
  - **Lawrence of Arabia** (1962, Academy Award)
  - **Doctor Zhivago** (1965, Academy Award)
  - **Ryan's Daughter** (1970, Academy Award)
- Jack Hildyard
  - The Sound Barrier (1952)
  - Hobson's Choice (1954)
  - Summertime (1955)
  - **The Bridge on the River Kwai** (1957, Academy Award)

Spike Lee

- Malik Hassan Sayeed
  - Clockers (1995)
  - Girl 6 (1996)
  - He Got Game (1998)
  - The Original Kings of Comedy (2000)
- Ernest Dickerson
  - She's Gotta Have It (1986)
  - School Daze (1988)
  - Do the Right Thing (1989)
  - Mo' Better Blues (1990)
  - Jungle Fever (1991)
  - Malcolm X (1992)
- Matthew Libatique
  - She Hate Me (2004)
  - Inside Man (2006)
  - Miracle at St. Anna (2008)
  - Kobe Doin' Work (2009)
  - Chi-Raq (2015)
  - Highest 2 Lowest (2025)

Mike Leigh

- Dick Pope
  - Life Is Sweet (1990)
  - Naked (1993)
  - Secrets & Lies (1996)
  - Career Girls (1997)
  - Topsy-Turvy (1999)
  - All or Nothing (2002)
  - Vera Drake (2004)
  - Happy-Go-Lucky (2008)
  - Another Year (2010)
  - Mr. Turner (2014)

Richard Lester

- David Watkin
  - The Knack ...and How to Get It (1965)
  - Help! (1965)
  - How I Won the War (1967)
  - The Bed Sitting Room (1969)
  - The Three Musketeers (1973)
  - The Four Musketeers (1974)
  - Robin and Marian (1976)
  - Cuba (1979)
- Gilbert Taylor
  - It's Trad, Dad! (1962)
  - A Hard Day's Night (1964)
- Robert Paynter
  - Superman II (1980)
  - Superman III (1983)
  - Get Back (1991)

Richard Linklater

- Lee Daniel
  - Slacker (1991)
  - Dazed and Confused (1993)
  - Before Sunrise (1995)
  - subUrbia (1996)
  - Before Sunset (2004)
  - Fast Food Nation (2006)
  - Boyhood (2014) (with Shane Kelly)
- Shane Kelly
  - A Scanner Darkly (2006)
  - Boyhood (2014) (With Lee Daniel)
  - Everybody Wants Some!! (2016)
  - Last Flag Flying (2017)
  - Where'd You Go, Bernadette (2018)
  - Blue Moon (2025)

Joseph Losey

- Christopher Challis
  - Blind Date (1959)
  - Steaming (1985)
- Gerry Fisher
  - Accident (1967)
  - Secret Ceremony (1968)
  - The Go-Between (1971)
  - A Doll's House (1973)
  - The Romantic Englishwoman (1975)
  - Monsieur Klein (1976)
  - Roads to the South (1978)
  - Don Giovanni (1979)

David Lynch

- Peter Deming
  - Lost Highway (1997)
  - Mulholland Drive (2001)
- Freddie Francis
  - The Elephant Man (1980)
  - Dune (1984)
  - The Straight Story (1999)
- Frederick Elmes
  - The Amputee (1974, short)
  - Eraserhead (1977)
  - Blue Velvet (1986)
  - Wild at Heart (1990)

== M ==
James Mangold

- Phedon Papamichael
  - Identify (2003)
  - Walk the Line (2005)
  - Knight and Day (2010)
  - Ford v Ferrari (2019)
  - Indiana Jones and the Dial of Destiny (2023)
  - A Complete Unknown (2024)

Joseph L. Mankiewicz

- Milton Krasner
  - House of Strangers (1949)
  - No Way Out (1950)
  - All About Eve (1950, Academy Award nomination)
  - People Will Talk (1951)

Michael Mann

- Dante Spinotti
  - Manhunter (1986)
  - The Last of the Mohicans (1992)
  - Heat (1995)
  - The Insider (1999, Academy Award nomination)
  - Public Enemies (2009)

Jean-Pierre Melville

- Henri Decaë
  - Le Silence de la mer (1949)
  - Les Enfants Terribles (1950)
  - Bob le flambeur (1956)
  - Léon Morin, Priest (1961)
  - Magnet of Doom (1963)
  - Le Samouraï (1967)
  - Le Cercle Rouge (1970)

Vincente Minnelli

- Milton Krasner
  - Home from the Hill (1960)
  - Bells Are Ringing (1960)
  - The Four Horsemen of the Apocalypse (1962)
  - The Courtship of Eddie's Father (1963)
  - Goodbye Charlie (1964)
  - The Sandpiper (1965)
- Joseph Ruttenberg
  - Brigadoon (1954)
  - Kismet (1955)
  - **Gigi** (1958, Academy Award)
  - The Reluctant Debutante (1958)
- John Alton
  - Father of the Bride (1950)
  - Father's Little Dividend (1951)
  - **An American in Paris** (1952, Academy Award)
  - Tea and Sympathy (1956)
  - Designing Woman (1957)

Kenji Mizoguchi

- Minoru Miki
  - The Water Magician (1933)
  - Orizuru Osen (1935)
  - Osaka Elegy (1936)
  - Sisters of the Gion (1936)
  - The Story of the Last Chrysanthemums (1939)
  - Miyamoto Musashi (1944)
  - Utamaro and His Five Women (1946)
  - The Love of the Actress Sumako (1947)
- Kazuo Miyagawa
  - Miss Oyu (1951)
  - A Geisha (1953)
  - Ugetsu (1953)
  - Sansho the Bailiff (1954)
  - The Crucified Lovers (1954)
  - The Woman in the Rumor (1954)
  - Shin Heike Monogatari (1955)
  - Street of Shame (1956)

== N ==
Christopher Nolan

- Wally Pfister
  - Memento (2000)
  - Insomnia (2002)
  - Batman Begins (2005, Academy Award nomination)
  - The Prestige (2006, Academy Award nomination)
  - The Dark Knight (2008, Academy Award nomination)
  - **Inception** (2010, Academy Award)
  - The Dark Knight Rises (2012)
- Hoyte van Hoytema
  - Interstellar (2014)
  - Dunkirk (2017, Academy Award nomination)
  - Tenet (2020)
  - **Oppenheimer** (2023, Academy Award)
  - The Odyssey (2026)

== O ==
Yasujirō Ozu

- Hideo Mohara
  - Walk Cheerfully (1930)
  - I Flunked, But... (1930)
  - That Night's Wife (1930)
  - The Lady and the Beard (1931)
  - Tokyo Chorus (1931)
  - I Was Born, But... (1932)
  - Where Now Are the Dreams of Youth (1932)
  - Woman of Tokyo (1933)
  - Dragnet Girl (1934)
  - A Story of Floating Weeds (1934)
  - An Inn in Tokyo (1935)
  - What Did the Lady Forget (1937)
- Yuhara Atsuta
  - Brothers and Sisters of the Toda Family (1941)
  - There Was a Father (1942)
  - Record of a Tenant Gentleman (1947)
  - A Hen in the Wind (1947)
  - Late Spring (1949)
  - Early Summer (1951)
  - The Flavor of Green Tea over Rice (1952)
  - Tokyo Story (1953)
  - Early Spring (1956)
  - Tokyo Twilight (1957)
  - Equinox Flower (1958)
  - Ohayo (1959)
  - Late Autumn (1960)
  - An Autumn Afternoon (1962)

== P ==
Alan J. Pakula

- Gordon Willis
  - Klute (1971)
  - The Parallax View (1974)
  - All the President's Men (1976)
  - Comes a Horseman (1978)
  - Presumed Innocent (1990)
  - The Devil's Own (1997)

Park Chan-wook

- Chung Chung-hoon
  - Oldboy (2003)
  - Three... Extremes (segment "Cut") (2004)
  - Sympathy for Lady Vengeance (2005)
  - I'm a Cyborg, But That's OK (2006)
  - Thirst (2009)
  - Stoker (2013)
  - The Handmaiden (2016)

Alan Parker

- Peter Biziou
  - Bugsy Malone (1976) — with Michael Seresin
  - Pink Floyd – The Wall (1982)
  - Mississippi Burning (1988, Academy Award nomination)
  - The Road to Wellville (1994)
- Michael Seresin
  - Bugsy Malone (1976) — with Peter Biziou
  - Midnight Express (1978)
  - Fame (1980)
  - Shoot the Moon (1982)
  - Birdy (1984)
  - Angel Heart (1987)
  - Come See the Paradise (1990)
  - Angela's Ashes (1999)
  - The Life of David Gale (2003)

Pier Paolo Pasolini

- Tonino Delli Colli
  - Accattone (1961)
  - Mamma Roma (1962)
  - Ro.Go.Pa.G. (segment "La ricotta") (1963)
  - The Gospel According to St. Matthew (1964)
  - Love Meetings (1965)
  - The Hawks and the Sparrows (1966) — with Mario Bernardo
  - Caprice Italian Style (segment "Che cosa sono le nuvole?") (1968)
  - Pigsty (1969) with Armando Nannuzzi and Giuseppe Ruzzolini
  - The Decameron (1971)
  - The Canterbury Tales (1972)
  - Salò, or the 120 Days of Sodom (1975)

Sam Peckinpah

- Lucien Ballard
  - Ride the High Country (1962)
  - Noon Wine (1966)
  - The Wild Bunch (1969)
  - The Ballad of Cable Hogue (1970)
  - Junior Bonner (1972)
  - The Getaway (1972)
- John Coquillon
  - Straw Dogs (1971)
  - Pat Garrett and Billy the Kid (1973)
  - Cross of Iron (1977)
  - The Osterman Weekend (1983)

Tyler Perry

- Alexander Gruszynski
  - Madea Goes to Jail (2009)
  - I Can Do Bad All by Myself (2009)
  - For Colored Girls (2010)
  - Good Deeds (2012)
  - Temptation: Confessions of a Marriage Counselor (2013)
  - A Madea Christmas (2013)
  - The Single Moms Club (2014)
- Toromichi Kurita
  - Why Did I Get Married? (2007)
  - The Family That Preys (2008)
  - Why Did I Get Married Too? (2010)
  - Madea's Big Happy Family (2011)
- Richard Vialet
  - Acrimony (2018)
  - Nobody's Fool (2018)
  - A Madea Family Funeral (2019)
  - A Fall from Grace (2020)
- Justyn Moro
  - Straw (2025)
  - Madea's Destination Wedding (2025)
  - Finding Joy (2025)
  - Why Did I Get Married Again? (2026)
  - Doing Life (2026)

Todd Phillips

- Lawrence Sher
  - The Hangover (2009)
  - Due Date (2010)
  - The Hangover Part II (2011)
  - The Hangover Part III (2013)
  - War Dogs (2016)
  - Joker (2019, Academy Award nomination)
  - Joker: Folie à Deux (2024)

Roman Polanski

- Paweł Edelman
  - The Pianist (2002)
  - Oliver Twist (2005)
  - The Ghost Writer (2010)
  - Carnage (2011)
  - Venus in Fur (2013)
  - Based on a True Story (2017)
  - An Officer and a Spy (2019)
  - The Palace (2023)
- Witold Sobocinski
  - Pirates (1986)
  - Frantic (1988)
- Gilbert Taylor
  - Repulsion (1965)
  - Cul-de-sac (1966)
  - Macbeth (1971)

Sydney Pollack

- Owen Roizman
  - Three Days of the Condor (1975)
  - The Electric Horseman (1979)
  - Absence of Malice (1981)
  - Tootsie (1982, Academy Award nomination)
  - Havana (1990)

Powell and Pressburger

- Erwin Hillier
  - A Canterbury Tale (1944)
  - I Know Where I'm Going! (1945)
- Jack Cardiff
  - A Matter of Life and Death (1946)
  - **Black Narcissus** (1947, Academy Award)
  - The Red Shoes (1948)
- Christopher Challis
  - The Small Back Room (1949)
  - Gone to Earth (1950)
  - The Elusive Pimpernel (1950)
  - The Tales of Hoffmann (1951)
  - Oh... Rosalinda!! (1955)
  - The Battle of the River Plate (1956)
  - Ill Met by Moonlight (1957)
  - The Boy Who Turned Yellow (1972)

== R ==
Sam Raimi

- Peter Deming
  - Evil Dead II (1987)
  - Drag Me to Hell (2009)
  - Oz the Great and Powerful (2013)
- Bill Pope
  - Darkman (1990)
  - Army of Darkness (1992)
  - Spider-Man 2 (2004)
  - Spider-Man 3 (2007)
  - Send Help (2026)

Mani Ratnam

- P. C. Sreeram
  - Mouna Ragam (1986)
  - Nayakan (1987)
  - Agni Natchathiram (1988)
  - Geethanjali (1989)
  - Thiruda Thiruda (1993)
  - Alaipayuthey (2000)
  - O Kadhal Kanmani (2015)
- Santosh Sivan
  - Thalapathi (1991)
  - Roja (1992)
  - Iruvar (1997)
  - Dil Se.. (1998)
  - Raavanan (2010)
  - Chekka Chivantha Vaanam (2018)

Brett Ratner

- Dante Spinotti
  - The Family Man (2000)
  - Red Dragon (2002)
  - After the Sunset (2004)
  - X-Men: The Last Stand (2006)
  - Tower Heist (2011)
  - Hercules (2014)

Rob Reiner

- Thomas Del Ruth
  - Stand by Me (1986)
  - Flipped (2010)
- Barry Sonnenfeld
  - When Harry Met Sally... (1989)
  - Misery (1990)
- Barry Markowitz
  - Being Charlie (2015)
  - LBJ (2016)
  - Shock and Awe (2017)
  - Albert Brooks: Defending My Life (2023) with Rocker Meadows
- John Seale
  - The American President (1995)
  - Ghosts of Mississippi (1996)
- Reed Morano
  - The Magic of Belle Isle (2012)
  - And So It Goes (2014)

Alain Resnais

- Sacha Vierny
  - Hiroshima mon amour (1959) – with Michio Takahashi
  - Last Year at Marienbad (1961)
  - Muriel (1963)
  - The War Is Over (1966)
  - Stavisky (1974)
  - My American Uncle (1980)
  - Love Unto Death (1984)

Martin Ritt

- James Wong Howe
  - Hud (1963)
  - The Outrage (1964)
  - Hombre (1967)
  - The Molly Maguires (1970)
- John A. Alonzo
  - Sounder (1972)
  - Pete 'n' Tillie (1972)
  - Conrack (1974)
  - Casey's Shadow (1978)
  - Norma Rae (1979)
  - Back Roads (1981)
  - Cross Creek (1983)

Éric Rohmer

- Néstor Almendros
  - Six in Paris (segment "Place de l'Etoile") (1965) with Étienne Becker
  - La Collectionneuse (1967)
  - My Night at Maud's (1969)
  - Claire's Knee (1970)
  - Love in the Afternoon (1972)
  - The Marquise of O (1976)
  - Perceval le Gallois (1978)
  - Pauline at the Beach (1983)

Russo brothers

- Newton Thomas Sigel
  - Cherry (2021)
  - Avengers: Doomsday (2026)
- Stephen F. Windon
  - The Gray Man (2022)
  - The Electric State (2025)
- Trent Opaloch
  - Captain America: The Winter Soldier (2014)
  - Captain America: Civil War (2016)
  - Avengers: Infinity War (2018)
  - Avengers: Endgame (2019)

Mark Rydell

- Vilmos Zsigmond
  - Cinderella Liberty (1973)
  - The Rose (1979)
  - The River (1984, Academy Award nomination)
  - Intersection (1994)

== S ==
Joseph Sargent

- Mario Tosi
  - The Marcus-Nelson Murders— Made for TV (1973)
  - Friendly Persuasion — Made for TV (1975)
  - MacArthur (1977)
  - Coast to Coast (1980)

Franklin J. Schaffner

- Fred Koenekamp
  - Patton (1970, Academy Award nomination)
  - Papillon (1973)
  - Islands in the Stream (1977, Academy Award nomination)
  - Yes, Giorgio (1982)
  - Welcome Home (1989)

Fred Schepisi

- Ian Baker
  - The Devil's Playground (1976)
  - The Chant of Jimmie Blacksmith (1978)
  - Barbarosa (1982)
  - Iceman (1984)
  - Plenty (1985)
  - Roxanne (1987)
  - Evil Angels, aka A Cry in the Dark (1988)
  - The Russia House (1990)
  - Mr. Baseball (1992)
  - Six Degrees of Separation (1993)
  - I.Q. (1994)
  - Fierce Creatures (1997)
  - It Runs in the Family (2003)
  - Empire Falls (2005, miniseries)
  - The Eye of the Storm (2011)
  - Words and Pictures (2013)

Paul Schrader

- John Bailey
  - American Gigolo (1980)
  - Cat People (1982)
  - Mishima: A Life in Four Chapters (1985)
  - Light of Day (1987)
  - Forever Mine (1999)
- Alexander Dynan
  - Dog Eat Dog (2015)
  - First Reformed (2017)
  - The Card Counter (2021)
  - Master Gardener (2022)

Martin Scorsese

- Michael Ballhaus
  - After Hours (1985)
  - The Color of Money (1986)
  - The Last Temptation of Christ (1988)
  - Goodfellas (1990)
  - The Age of Innocence (1993)
  - Gangs of New York (2002, Academy Award nomination)
  - The Departed (2006)
- Michael Chapman
  - Taxi Driver (1976)
  - The Last Waltz (1978, concert film)
  - American Boy: A Profile of Steven Prince (1978)
  - Raging Bull (1980, Academy Award nomination)
  - Bad (1987, music video)
- Rodrigo Prieto
  - The Wolf of Wall Street (2013)
  - The Audition (2015 short)
  - Silence (2016, Academy Award nomination)
  - The Irishman (2019, Academy Award nomination)
  - Killers of the Flower Moon (2023, Academy Award nomination)
- Robert Richardson
  - Casino (1995)
  - Bringing Out the Dead (1999)
  - **The Aviator** (2004, Academy Award)
  - Shine a Light (2008)
  - Shutter Island (2010)
  - George Harrison: Living in the Material World (2011)
  - **Hugo** (2011, Academy Award)

Ridley Scott

- John Mathieson
  - Gladiator (2000, Academy Award nomination)
  - Hannibal (2001)
  - Matchstick Men (2003)
  - Kingdom of Heaven (2005)
  - Robin Hood (2010)
  - Gladiator II (2024)
- Dariusz Wolski
  - Prometheus (2012)
  - The Counselor (2013)
  - Exodus: Gods and Kings (2014)
  - The Martian (2015)
  - Alien: Covenant (2017)
  - All the Money in the World (2017)
  - The Last Duel (2021)
  - House of Gucci (2021)
  - Napoleon (2023)

Don Siegel

- Bruce Surtees
  - The Beguiled (1971)
  - Dirty Harry (1971)
  - The Shootist (1976)
  - Escape from Alcatraz (1979)

Bryan Singer

- Newton Thomas Sigel
  - The Usual Suspects (1995)
  - Apt Pupil (1998)
  - X-Men (2000)
  - X2 (2003)
  - Superman Returns (2006)
  - Valkyrie (2008)
  - Jack the Giant Slayer (2013)
  - X-Men: Days of Future Past (2014)
  - X-Men: Apocalypse (2016)
  - Bohemian Rhapsody (2018)

Douglas Sirk

- Russell Metty
  - Against All Flags (1952, co-directed by George Sherman)
  - Take Me to Town (1953)
  - Taza, Son of Cochise (1954)
  - Magnificent Obsession (1954)
  - Sign of the Pagan (1954)
  - All That Heaven Allows (1955)
  - There's Always Tomorrow (1956)
  - Written on the Wind (1956)
  - Battle Hymn (1957)
  - A Time to Love and a Time to Die (1958)
  - Imitation of Life (1959)

Steven Spielberg

- Dean Cundey
  - Hook (1991)
  - Jurassic Park (1993)
- Allen Daviau
  - Slipstream (1967)
  - Amblin' (1968)
  - E.T. the Extra-Terrestrial (1982, Academy Award nomination)
  - Twilight Zone: The Movie (segment "Kick the Can") (1983)
  - The Color Purple (1985, Academy Award nomination)
  - Empire of the Sun (1987, Academy Award nomination)
- Janusz Kamiński
  - **Schindler's List** (1993, Academy Award)
  - The Lost World: Jurassic Park (1997)
  - Amistad (1997, Academy Award nomination)
  - **Saving Private Ryan** (1998, Academy Award)
  - A.I. Artificial Intelligence (2001)
  - Minority Report (2002)
  - Catch Me If You Can (2002)
  - The Terminal (2004)
  - War of the Worlds (2005)
  - Munich (2005)
  - Indiana Jones and the Kingdom of the Crystal Skull (2008)
  - War Horse (2011, Academy Award nomination)
  - Lincoln (2012, Academy Award nomination)
  - Bridge of Spies (2015)
  - The BFG (2016)
  - The Post (2017)
  - Ready Player One (2018)
  - West Side Story (2021, Academy Award nomination)
  - The Fabelmans (2022)
  - Disclosure Day (2026)
- Vilmos Zsigmond
  - The Sugarland Express (1974)
  - **Close Encounters of the Third Kind** (1977, Academy Award)

George Stevens

- William C. Mellor
  - **A Place in the Sun** (1951, Academy Award)
  - Giant (1956)
  - **The Diary of Anne Frank** (1959, Academy Award)
  - The Greatest Story Ever Told (1965)
- Robert De Grasse
  - Alice Adams (1935)
  - Quality Street (1937)
  - Vivacious Lady (1938, Academy Award nomination)
  - Vigil in the Night (1940)

Oliver Stone

- Rodrigo Prieto
  - Comandante (2003) — with Carlos Marcovich
  - Persona Non Grata (2003) — with Serguei Saldívar Tanaka
  - Looking for Fidel (2004) — with Carlos Marcovich
  - Alexander (2004)
  - Wall Street: Money Never Sleeps (2010)
  - The Putin Interviews (2017) with Anthony Dod Mantle
- Robert Richardson
  - Salvador (1986)
  - Platoon (1986, Academy Award nomination)
  - Wall Street (1987)
  - Talk Radio (1988)
  - Born on the Fourth of July (1989, Academy Award nomination)
  - The Doors (1991)
  - **JFK** (1991, Academy Award)
  - Heaven & Earth (1993)
  - Natural Born Killers (1994)
  - Nixon (1995)
  - U Turn (1997)

== T ==
Quentin Tarantino

- Robert Richardson
  - Kill Bill: Volume 1 (2003)
  - Kill Bill: Volume 2 (2004)
  - Inglourious Basterds (2009, Academy Award nomination)
  - Django Unchained (2012, Academy Award nomination)
  - The Hateful Eight (2015, Academy Award nomination)
  - Once Upon a Time in Hollywood (2019, Academy Award nomination)
- Andrzej Sekula
  - Reservoir Dogs (1992)
  - Pulp Fiction (1994)
  - Four Rooms (1995, Segment: The Man from Hollywood)

François Truffaut

- Néstor Almendros
  - The Wild Child (1970)
  - Bed and Board (1970)
  - Two English Girls (1971)
  - The Story of Adele H. (1975)
  - The Man Who Loved Women (1977)
  - The Green Room (1978)
  - Love on the Run (1979)
  - The Last Metro (1980)
  - Confidentially Yours (1983)
- Raoul Coutard
  - Shoot the Piano Player (1960)
  - Jules and Jim (1962)
  - Love at Twenty (segment "Antoine et Colette") (1962)
  - The Soft Skin (1964)
  - The Bride Wore Black (1968)

Tom Tykwer

- Frank Griebe
  - Deadly Maria (1993)
  - Winter Sleepers (1997)
  - Run Lola Run (1998)
  - The Princess and the Warrior (2000)
  - Heaven (2002)
  - Perfume: The Story of a Murderer (2006)
  - Paris, je t'aime (segment "Faubourg Saint-Denis") (2006)
  - The International (2009)
  - Three (2010)
  - Cloud Atlas (2012) — with John Toll
  - A Hologram for the King (2016)

== V ==
Gore Verbinski

- Dariusz Wolski
  - The Mexican (2001)
  - Pirates of the Caribbean: The Curse of the Black Pearl (2003)
  - Pirates of the Caribbean: Dead Man's Chest (2006)
  - Pirates of the Caribbean: At World's End (2007)

Paul Verhoeven

- Jan de Bont
  - Business Is Business (1971)
  - Turkish Delight (1973)
  - Keetje Tippel (1975)
  - The Fourth Man (1983)
  - Flesh and Blood (1985)
  - Basic Instinct (1992)
- Jost Vacano
  - Soldier of Orange (1977)
  - Spetters (1980)
  - RoboCop (1987)
  - Total Recall (1990)
  - Showgirls (1995)
  - Starship Troopers (1997)
  - Hollow Man (2000)

Denis Villeneuve

- Roger Deakins
  - Prisoners (2013, Academy Award nomination)
  - Sicario (2015, Academy Award nomination)
  - **Blade Runner 2049** (2017, Academy Award)
- André Turpin
  - Cosmos (1996) — segment Le Technétium
  - August 32nd on Earth (1998)
  - Maelström (2000)
  - Incendies (2010)

== W ==
The Wachowskis

- Bill Pope
  - Bound (1996)
  - The Matrix (1999)
  - The Matrix Reloaded (2003)
  - The Matrix Revolutions (2003)
- John Toll
  - Cloud Atlas (2012) with Frank Griebe
  - Jupiter Ascending (2015)
  - The Matrix Resurrections (2021) with Daniele Massaccesi

Peter Weir

- Russell Boyd
  - Picnic at Hanging Rock (1975)
  - The Last Wave (1977)
  - Gallipoli (1981)
  - The Year of Living Dangerously (1982)
  - **Master and Commander: The Far Side of the World** (2003, Academy Award)
  - The Way Back (2010)
- John Seale
  - Witness (1985)
  - The Mosquito Coast (1986)
  - Dead Poets Society (1988)

Wei Te-sheng

- Chin Ting-chang
  - Cape No. 7 (2008)
  - Warriors of the Rainbow: Seediq Bale (2011)
  - Kano (2014)
  - 52Hz, I Love You (2017)
  - Taiwan Trilogy (TBA)

Wim Wenders

- Robby Müller
  - Summer in the City (1970)
  - The Goalkeeper's Fear of the Penalty (1972)
  - The Scarlet Letter (1973)
  - Alice in the Cities (1974)
  - The Wrong Move (1975)
  - Kings of the Road (1976)
  - The American Friend (1977)
  - Paris, Texas (1984)
  - Notebook on Cities and Clothes (1989 documentary) with others
  - Until the End of the World (1991)

Wong Kar-wai

- Christopher Doyle
  - Days of Being Wild (1990)
  - Ashes of Time (1994) with Kwan Pun Leung
  - Chungking Express (1994) with Andrew Lau
  - Fallen Angels (1995)
  - wkw/tk/1996@7'55"hk.net (1996 short)
  - Happy Together (1997)
  - In the Mood for Love (2000) with Mark Lee Ping Bin and Kwan Pun Leung
  - Eros (segment "The Hand") (2004)
  - 2046 (2004) with Kwan Pun Leung and Lai Yiu-fai

Billy Wilder

- John F. Seitz
  - Five Graves to Cairo (1943, Academy Award nomination)
  - Double Indemnity (1944, Academy Award nomination)
  - The Lost Weekend (1945, Academy Award nomination)
  - Sunset Boulevard (1950, Academy Award nomination)
- Joseph LaShelle
  - The Apartment (1960, Academy Award nomination)
  - Irma la Douce (1963, Academy Award nomination)
  - Kiss Me, Stupid (1964, Academy Award nomination)
  - The Fortune Cookie (1966, Academy Award nomination)
- Charles Lang
  - A Foreign Affair (1948, Academy Award nomination)
  - Ace in the Hole (1951)
  - Sabrina (1954, Academy Award nomination)

Michael Winner

- Alan Jones
  - A Chorus of Disapproval (1989)
  - Bullseye (1990)
  - Dirty Weekend (1993)
- Robert Paynter
  - Hannibal Brooks (1969)
  - The Games (1970)
  - Lawman (1971)
  - The Nightcomers (1971)
  - Chato's Land (1972)
  - The Mechanic (1972) with Richard H. Kline
  - Scorpio (1973)
  - The Big Sleep (1978)
  - Firepower (1979)
  - Scream for Help (1984)

James Wong

- Robert McLachlan
  - Final Destination (2000)
  - The One (2001)
  - Final Destination 3 (2006)

John Woo

- Jeffrey L. Kimball
  - Mission: Impossible 2 (2000)
  - The Hire: Hostage (2002)
  - Windtalkers (2002)
  - Paycheck (2003)
- Bill Wong
  - Once a Thief (1991)
  - Blackjack (1998)

Edgar Wright

- Bill Pope
  - Scott Pilgrim vs. the World (2010)
  - The World's End (2013)
  - Baby Driver (2017)

Joe Wright

- Seamus McGarvey
  - Atonement (2007, Academy Award nomination)
  - The Soloist (2009)
  - Anna Karenina (2012, Academy Award nomination)
  - Pan (2015)
  - Cyrano (2021)
- Bruno Delbonnel
  - Darkest Hour (2017, Academy Award nomination)
  - The Woman in the Window (2019)

William Wyler

- Robert Surtees
  - **Ben-Hur** (1959, Academy Award)
  - The Collector (1965) with Robert Krasker
  - The Liberation of L.B. Jones (1970)
- Gregg Toland
  - These Three (1936)
  - Come and Get It (1936) with Rudolph Maté
  - Dead End (1937, Academy Award nomination)
  - **Wuthering Heights** (1939, Academy Award)
  - The Westerner (1940)
  - The Little Foxes (1941)
  - The Best Years of Our Lives (1946)
- Franz Planer
  - Roman Holiday (1953, Academy Award nomination), with Henri Alekan
  - The Big Country (1958)
  - The Children's Hour (1961, Academy Award nomination)

== Z ==
Robert Zemeckis

- Don Burgess
  - Forrest Gump (1994, Academy Award nomination)
  - Contact (1997)
  - What Lies Beneath (2000)
  - Cast Away (2000)
  - The Polar Express (2004)
  - Flight (2012)
  - Allied (2016)
  - The Witches (2020)
  - Pinocchio (2022)
  - Here (2024)
- Dean Cundey
  - Romancing the Stone (1984)
  - Back to the Future (1985)
  - Who Framed Roger Rabbit (1988)
  - Back to the Future Part II (1989)
  - Back to the Future Part III (1990)
