= Handicapped Future =

- Directed by: Werner Herzog
- Produced by: Werner Herzog
- Narrated by: Rolf Illig
- Cinematography: Jörg Schmidt-Reitwein
- Edited by: Beate Mainka-Jellinghaus
- Release date: 1971
- Running time: 43 minutes
- Languages: German; English

Handicapped Future (German: Behinderte Zukunft) is a 1971 documentary film by Werner Herzog about physically disabled children in Munich.

The film was made at the request of a disabled friend of Herzog's, specifically in order to raise awareness for disability rights in West Germany. Herzog compares the film to his earlier The Flying Doctors of East Africa in that it has very little stylization, and is, he says, "dangerously conventional." During production of Handicapped Future, Herzog met Fini Straubringer, and this meeting led directly to Herzog's more well-known film Land of Silence and Darkness.
