= Precautions Against Fanatics =

1969 film

- Directed by: Werner Herzog
- Written by: Werner Herzog
- Produced by: Werner Herzog
- Cinematography: Dieter Lohmann; Jörg Schmidt-Reitwein
- Edited by: Beate Mainka-Jellinghaus
- Release date: 1969
- Running time: 12 minutes
- Country: West Germany
- Language: German

Precautions Against Fanatics (German: Massnahmen gegen Fanatiker) is a short film by Werner Herzog filmed at a harness racing track near Munich, Germany. It was Herzog's first film shot in color.

The film features several horse trainers and other track workers talking about their roles at the track, always eventually interrupted by an older man who claims to be the true authority, and demands that they be thrown out. One recurring young man, the first to appear, claims that he protects the horses from enthusiastic racing fans. He does not appear to be employed by the track, but seems to provide his services voluntarily. His protection from "fanatics" gives the film its title. Also featured is a man who trains the horses by walking them around a tree for 36 hours at a time, and a man whose job is "doping" the horses with garlic before races. The film ends with the young man who protects against fanatics seated at a zoo. He says that the track officials asked him to leave, and now he protects the zoo's flamingos from fanatics.

The film is shot in a documentary style, but the sheer implausibility of the dialogue leaves the exact nature of the film ambiguous. The director states that the film is intended to be humorous, and Herzog's official website describes the film as an "Elaborate on-camera practical joke."
