= WLAC (disambiguation) =

WLAC is an AM radio station licensed to serve Nashville, Tennessee.

- WKNC-FM#WLAC_(1922–1923), Raleigh, North Carolina station licensed from 1922 to 1923
- WNRQ, formerly WLAC-FM, an FM radio station in Nashville, Tennessee
- WTVF, formerly WLAC-TV, a television station in Nashville, Tennessee

WLAC may also refer to:

- West London Aero Club
- West Los Angeles College
- World Livestock Auctioneer Championship
