= No One Will Play with Me =

No One Will Play With Me
- Directed by: Werner Herzog
- Produced by: Werner Herzog
- Cinematography: Jörg Schmidt-Reitwein
- Edited by: Beate Mainka-Jellinghaus
- Release date: 1976
- Running time: 14 min
- Language: German

No One Will Play With Me (German: Mit mir will keiner spielen) is a 1976 short film by Werner Herzog. The film focuses on a boy, Martin, who is outcast from the other children at his school. The film was made with pre-school children in Munich, and is partially based on true stories which Herzog heard from the children themselves. The use of a raven as a central plot element was inspired by the story of the raven from Herzog's earlier film The Great Ecstasy of Woodcarver Steiner.

== Plot summary ==
Martin is a young boy who sits in a corner while the children play at school. The other children dislike his shabby appearance, and refuse to play with him. With some effort, Martin convinces a classmate, Nicole, to come to his house and play with his talking raven. Martin explains that his mother is sick with cancer and cannot cook for him, and consequently he eats only popcorn. Martin's father beats him. Nicole becomes Martin's only friend, and he is so thankful that he gives his raven to her as a gift. Nicole then collects money from the other children to buy Martin a pair of guinea pigs.
