= The Power of Emotion =

1983 film

- Directed by: Alexander Kluge
- Written by: Alexander Kluge
- Produced by: Willi Segler; Alexander Kluge
- Starring: Alexandra Kluge; Hannelore Hoger
- Cinematography: Werner Luring; Thomas Mauch
- Edited by: Carola Mai, Beate Mainka-Jellinghaus
- Music by: Giuseppe Verdi
- Distributed by: ZDF, Kairos-Film
- Release date: 17 September 1983
- Running time: 115 minutes
- Country: West Germany
- Language: German

The Power of Emotion (German: Die Macht der Gefühle) is a 1983 West German essay film written and directed by Alexander Kluge. It was entered into the main competition at the 40th Venice International Film Festival.

The film uses a mixture of documentary, fictionalized narrative and archive footage to explore the ways in which cinema can express emotion. Like Germany in Autumn (1978) The Power of Emotion draws on multiple short narratives or documentary sequences, including the trial of a woman who has shot her husband to death, an interview with an opera singer, the state funeral of Heinz-Herbert Karry, sequences from Fritz Lang's Die Nibelungen, a time lapse of the Frankfurt skyline and a story of fugitive diamond thieves.

"The film Die Macht der Gefühle is not about feelings," Kluge wrote, "but rather their organization: how they can be organized by chance, through outside factors, murder, destiny; how they are organized, how they encounter the fortune they are seeking."
