= Game in the Sand =

1964 unreleased German short film

- Directed by: Werner Herzog
- Written by: Werner Herzog
- Produced by: Werner Herzog
- Cinematography: Jaime Pacheco
- Edited by: Werner Herzog
- Music by: Uwe Brandner
- Running time: 14 minutes

Game in the Sand (German: Spiel im Sand) is an unreleased short film written and directed by Werner Herzog in 1964. The plot concerns four children and a rooster in a cardboard box, and includes a scene where the chicken is buried in sand up to its neck. Very little information about the film and its production is known.

The film has never been published or publicly exhibited, and Herzog has stated that he will never release it in his lifetime. Herzog says that the shooting "got out of hand," in a way which caused him to abandon the project. He has likened the shoot to controversial moments in his later film Even Dwarfs Started Small, such as young piglets suckling on the corpse of a dead mother pig, and cannibalistic chickens, or when an actor was accidentally set on fire and run over by a truck. These moments were allowed a release in Dwarfs, but Herzog decided that the footage of Game in the Sand was not fit for release.
