= Huie's Sermon =

- Directed by: Werner Herzog
- Produced by: Werner Herzog
- Starring: Huie Rogers
- Cinematography: Thomas Mauch
- Edited by: Beate Mainka-Jellinghaus
- Production companies: Süddeutscher Rundfunk; Werner Herzog Filmproduktion
- Distributed by: Werner Herzog Filmproduktion
- Release date: 1981
- Running time: 43 minutes
- Country: West Germany
- Languages: English; German

Huie's Sermon (German: Huies Predigt) is a 1981 documentary film made for television by Werner Herzog. It consists almost entirely of a sermon delivered by Huie L. Rogers, a pastor of a Pentecostal congregation at the Bible Way Church of Our Lord Jesus Christ in Brooklyn, New York.

== Synopsis ==
The film is built almost entirely around Rogers' sermon, whose central theme is that God is in control of everything. Rogers preaches forcefully against the vices of modern society, and in particular against the pride of those who consider themselves equal to God. His argument is that human beings are only capable of destruction, not creation — a point he drives home with characteristic passion.

Rogers alternates between a melodic, sing-song delivery and furious outbursts, drawing vocal responses from the congregation. Herzog uses a phrase from Rogers as the film's closing statement: that if man had anything to do with the sun, it would not rise.

== Notable quote ==
Near the end of the documentary, Huie L. Rogers delivers a statement that encapsulates the sermon's theme. The exact wording as spoken is:

If man had anything to do with the sun, it wouldn't be rising every morning… If man had anything to do with it, the sun would have been rising [broken down].

— Huie L. Rogers

This text appears as a closing reflection rather than as part of the sermon itself, so it does not match the sermon's wording word-for-word.
