= God's Angry Man =

1981 film

- Scott's "FCC Monkey Band"
- Directed by: Werner Herzog
- Written by: Werner Herzog
- Produced by: Werner Herzog
- Starring: Gene Scott; Werner Herzog
- Narrated by: Werner Herzog
- Cinematography: Thomas Mauch
- Edited by: Beate Mainka-Jellinghaus
- Production companies: Werner Herzog Filmproduktion; Süddeutscher Rundfunk (SDR) (co-production)
- Distributed by: Werner Herzog Filmproduktion
- Release date: 1981
- Running time: 43 minutes
- Country: West Germany
- Languages: English; German

God's Angry Man is a 1981 documentary film directed by Werner Herzog about Gene Scott, a U.S. pastor and Stanford PhD who served for almost fifty years as an ordained minister and religious broadcaster in Los Angeles. The film was produced for television. The German title Glaube und Währung translates as Faith and Currency.

The film consists of footage of Scott on the set of his television program Festival of Faith and interviews with Scott and Scott's parents conducted by Herzog. The footage from Scott's television program focuses almost exclusively on his fund-raising efforts and an elaborate rant against the Federal Communications Commission (F.C.C.), which Scott blamed for threatening to revoke his broadcasting license. Scott at one point refuses to speak until his viewers pledge an additional $600. After several minutes of silence, he yells angrily at the camera until a production assistant informs him that they have received $700. Scott represents the F.C.C. on his show by a cymbal-banging monkey toy.
