= Ballad of the Little Soldier =

- Opening shot of the film.
- Directed by: Werner Herzog; Denis Reichle
- Written by: Werner Herzog; Denis Reichle
- Produced by: Werner Herzog
- Starring: Werner Herzog; Denis Reichle
- Narrated by: Werner Herzog
- Cinematography: Jorge Vignati; Michael Edols
- Edited by: Maximiliane Mainka
- Music by: Isidoro Reyes; Paladino Taylor
- Production companies: Süddeutscher Rundfunk; Werner Herzog Filmproduktion
- Distributed by: New Yorker Films
- Release dates: 5 November 1984 (West Germany); 3 April 1985 (United States)
- Running time: 44 minutes
- Country: West Germany
- Languages: English; German; Spanish; Miskito

Ballad of the Little Soldier (German: Ballade vom kleinen Soldaten) is a 1984 documentary film directed by Werner Herzog and Denis Reichle about child soldiers in Nicaragua. The film focuses on a group of Miskito Indians who used children soldiers in their resistance against the Sandinistas.

Herzog made and co-directed the film at the request of his friend Denis Reichle, a French-German journalist who himself served as a child-soldier in the Volkssturm at age fourteen in the final days of World War II. Reichle had attempted to make his own film about child soldiers but that project had stalled and he approached Herzog for help. The film is often cited as Herzog's most explicitly political, though Herzog denies that he had any specific statement on the politics of the Sandinistas. Herzog has said that the film is about child soldiers, and could have been made in any of several countries where child soldiers exist.
