= Ten Thousand Years Older =

- Tari examines a clock
- Directed by: Werner Herzog
- Written by: Werner Herzog
- Produced by: Lucki Stipetic
- Narrated by: Werner Herzog
- Cinematography: Vicente Rios
- Edited by: Joe Bini
- Release date: 2002
- Running time: 10 minutes
- Languages: English; Portuguese

Ten Thousand Years Older is a 2002 documentary film by Werner Herzog about the Amondauas (Uru Eus) people of Brazil. The ten-minute film was produced and included as part of the Ten Minutes Older project, released in the collection The Trumpet.

== Synopsis ==
The film opens with stock footage of the Amondauas' first contact with modern Brazilians in 1981. Herzog states that they had previously only a "stone age existence", with no knowledge of metalworking. Within several years, the majority of the tribe had been wiped out, most killed by chicken pox and the common cold.

Herzog visits the tribe twenty years after their first contact. He discusses the elders' opinions on their new life, as well as the children's. The elders long for their previous lives as jungle warriors, while the children are embarrassed by their parents and want to live as modern Brazilians.
