= Gesualdo: Death for Five Voices =

- Directed by: Werner Herzog
- Written by: Werner Herzog
- Produced by: Lucki Stipetic
- Starring: Milva
- Narrated by: Werner Herzog
- Cinematography: Peter Zeitlinger
- Edited by: Rainer Standke
- Music by: Carlo Gesualdo
- Release date: 1995
- Running time: 59 minutes
- Language: English

Gesualdo: Death for Five Voices (German: Tod für fünf Stimmen) is a 1995 film by German director Werner Herzog filmed for ZDF television. The film explores the music of Carlo Gesualdo and the legends surrounding Gesualdo's personality, his cursed castle, and his murder of his wife and her lover. Between narration and interviews, several of Gesualdo's madrigals are performed. Herzog calls Death for Five Voices "one of the films closest to my heart."

== Synopsis ==
The film begins in the ruins of Gesualdo's castle, where a worker is giving a tour. Several people are encountered, including a man who plays music into the cracks in the walls in order to deal with the demons which haunt the place, and a woman who claims to be the ghost of Donna Maria d'Avalos, Gesualdo's wife whom he murdered. Two cooks discuss and reconstruct an extravagant wedding feast which Gesualdo had ordered. Herzog also visits some workers from a local mental health clinic, who claim that they once treated the woman who claimed to be a ghost, and that they currently have two patients who believe themselves to be Carlo Gesualdo.

Herzog also interviews workers at the Palazzo San Severo in Naples, where Gesualdo committed the murders. A gate worker is interviewed, as well as the heir of d'Avalos, who shows Herzog the very bed in which the murders took place. Herzog then visits a nearby chapel which displays the preserved bodies of Maria d'Avalos and her lover.

These scenes are intercut with performances of Gesualdo's madrigals, as well as some historical and musical commentary by Gesualdo scholars.

== Production ==
Much of the film was shot in the town of Gesualdo in and around the site of Carlo Gesualdo's ruined castle. Other scenes were filmed in Venosa (the composer's attributed birthplace), Cortona, Arezzo and Naples.

The film contains many scenes which are not documentary in the traditional sense. Herzog says:

"Most of the stories in the film are completely invented and staged, yet they contain the most profound possible truths about Gesualdo. I think of all my 'documentaries', Death for Five Voices is the one that really runs amok, and it is one of the films closest to my heart."

The woman claiming to be the ghost of d'Avalos was played by famous Italian actress and singer Milva. The scene of a museum curator discussing an artifact which perplexed Gesualdo was scripted by Herzog. In fact the artifact shown in the film had puzzled Herzog himself and caused him to lose sleep, yet had no connection to Gesualdo. The story of Gesualdo's murder of his son by forcing him to ride on a swing for three days while a choir sang madrigals to him was also invented for the film.

The final scene of a renaissance fair performer talking with his mother on a cell phone was also staged. Herzog instructed his brother, standing just off-camera, to call the young man and for the man to act like his mother was asking him to come home. The young man was then instructed to stare seriously into the camera, and this footage was used during the end credits. To elicit the strange stare that the man gives, Herzog instructed him to look very serious, but then played around and made various jokes right next to the camera as soon as he started filming. Herzog used a similar direction for scenes of his earlier Even Dwarfs Started Small.
