= Slipstream (unfinished film) =

Unfinished short film directed by Steven Spielberg

- Directed by: Steven Spielberg
- Written by: Steven Spielberg; Roger Ernest
- Produced by: Steven Spielberg; Ralph Burris
- Starring: Tony Bill; Jim Baxes; Roger Ernest; Peter Maffia; Andre Oviedo
- Cinematography: Serge Haignere
- Country: United States

Slipstream is a 1967 American unfinished short film directed and co-produced by Steven Spielberg, who co-wrote the screenplay with Roger Ernest. It followed bicycle racers and was set to star Ernest alongside Tony Bill, Jim Baxes, Peter Maffia, and Andre Oviedo.

Relatively inexperienced at the time, Spielberg believed that Slipstream could be made for $5,000. Despite being donated equipment and film stock, he soon ran out of money and ended production. Assistant director Peter R. J. Deyell introduced him to aspiring cinematographer Allen Daviau, who appeared in Spielberg's films The Sugarland Express (1974) and Close Encounters of the Third Kind (1977). Later Spielberg hired Daviau, this time fully as cinematographer, for E.T. the Extra-Terrestrial (1982), The Color Purple (1985), and Empire of the Sun (1987).
