= How Much Wood Would a Woodchuck Chuck (film) =

1976 Documentary film directed by Werner Herzog

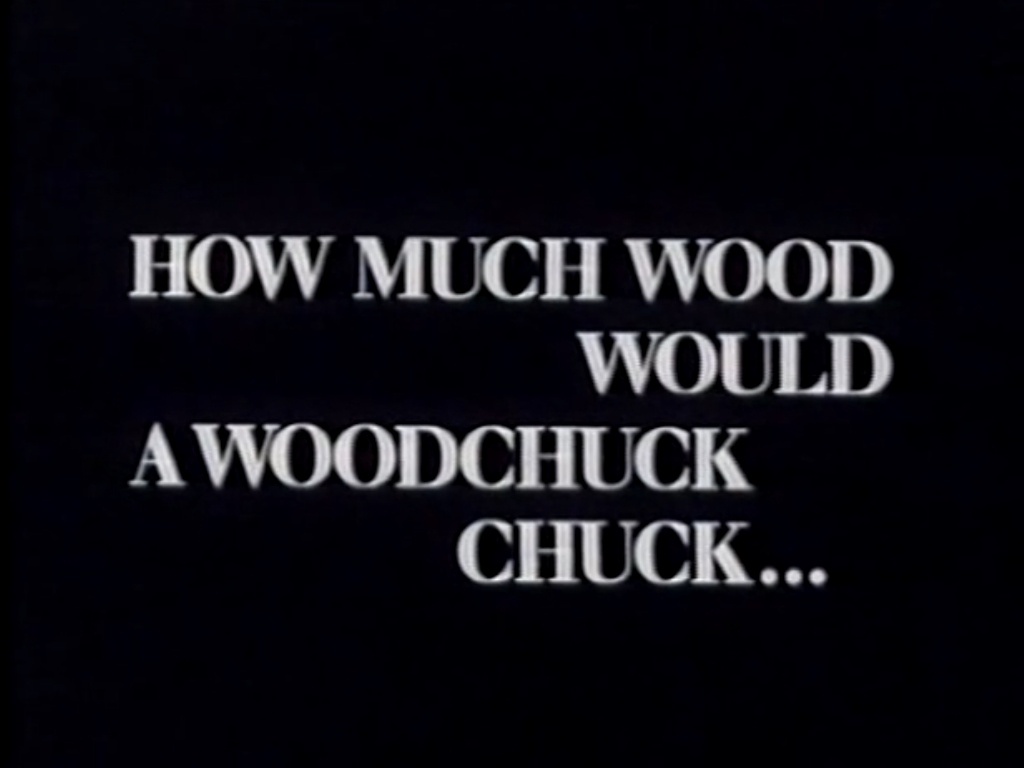
- Title card
- Directed by: Werner Herzog
- Written by: Werner Herzog
- Produced by: Werner Herzog
- Starring: Werner Herzog; Steve Liptay; Ralph Wade; Alan Ball; Abe Diffenbach
- Narrated by: Werner Herzog
- Cinematography: Thomas Mauch
- Edited by: Beate Mainka-Jellinghaus
- Production companies: Werner Herzog Filmproduktion; Süddeutscher Rundfunk
- Distributed by: Werner Herzog Filmproduktion
- Release dates: October 1976 (Hof Film Festival); 14 February 1977 (West Germany)
- Running time: 45 minutes
- Country: West Germany
- Languages: English; German

How Much Wood Would a Woodchuck Chuck (German: Beobachtungen zu einer neuen Sprache, literally "Observations of a New Language") is a 1976 documentary film by German director Werner Herzog, produced by Werner Herzog Filmproduktion. It is a 44-minute film documenting the World Livestock Auctioneer Championship held in New Holland, Pennsylvania. The film also contains a section about the Amish and shows Amish speaking Pennsylvania Dutch.

Herzog has said that he believes auctioneering to be "the last poetry possible, the poetry of capitalism". Herzog describes the auctioneering as an "extreme language ... frightening but quite beautiful at the same time".

Herzog used two of the featured auctioneers Ralph Wade and Scott McKain as actors in his later film Stroszek.

Cinematographer Edward Lachman got his start working with Herzog on this film; he would work on La Soufrière (1977) shortly after.

The film was shown at the Hof International Film Festival in October 1976.
