= Land of Silence and Darkness =

Land des Schweigens und der Dunkelheit
- English: Land of Silence and Darkness
- Directed by: Werner Herzog
- Written by: Werner Herzog
- Produced by: Werner Herzog
- Starring: Fini Straubinger
- Narrated by: Rolf Illig
- Cinematography: Jörg Schmidt-Reitwein
- Edited by: Beate Mainka-Jellinghaus
- Music by: J.S. Bach, Vivaldi
- Production companies: Referat für Filmgeschichte; Werner Herzog Filmproduktion
- Distributed by: Werner Herzog Filmproduktion
- Release date: 1971
- Running time: 85 minutes
- Country: West Germany
- Languages: German, German Sign Language

Land of Silence and Darkness (German: Land des Schweigens und der Dunkelheit) is a 1971 documentary film about deaf-blind people and their experience of life. The film was written, directed, and produced by Werner Herzog. Rolf Illig provided narration.

== Plot ==
Herzog follows Fini Straubinger, a German woman who became deaf-blind early in life, as she visits with other deaf-blind people, and discusses their struggles living in the modern world. In one scene from the film, the filmmakers visit a home for boys who were born deaf-blind, in another, Fini Straubinger and her friends ride in an aeroplane. In the final scene, a man examines a tree with his hands, and embraces it.

== See also ==
- 1971 in film
- Deafblindness
- Tactile signing
- List of films featuring the deaf and hard of hearing

== Bibliography ==
- Walsh, Gene (1979). Images at the Horizon: A Workshop with Werner Herzog, Conducted by Roger Ebert. Chicago. p. 22.
