= The Flying Doctors of East Africa =

1969 documentary film by Werner Herzog

- Directed by: Werner Herzog
- Produced by: Werner Herzog
- Starring: Sir Michael Wood
- Narrated by: Wilfried Klaus
- Cinematography: Thomas Mauch
- Edited by: Beate Mainka-Jellinghaus
- Release date: 1969
- Running time: 45 minutes
- Languages: German; English

The Flying Doctors of East Africa (German: Die Fliegenden Ärzte von Ostafrika) is a 1969 documentary film by Werner Herzog about the "flying doctors" service of the African Medical and Research Foundation in Tanzania and Kenya. The film is a fairly conventional documentary made during the filming of Herzog's more stylized films Fata Morgana and Even Dwarfs Started Small.

Herzog was asked to make this film by some friends of the doctors themselves. The film consists mostly of factual accounts of the doctors' service, mostly avoiding the surrealism and stylizations that characterize the typical Herzog film. Herzog has said, "I do not even call it a film, it is much more a Bericht, a report."
