= Peter Zeitlinger =

Austrian cinematographer

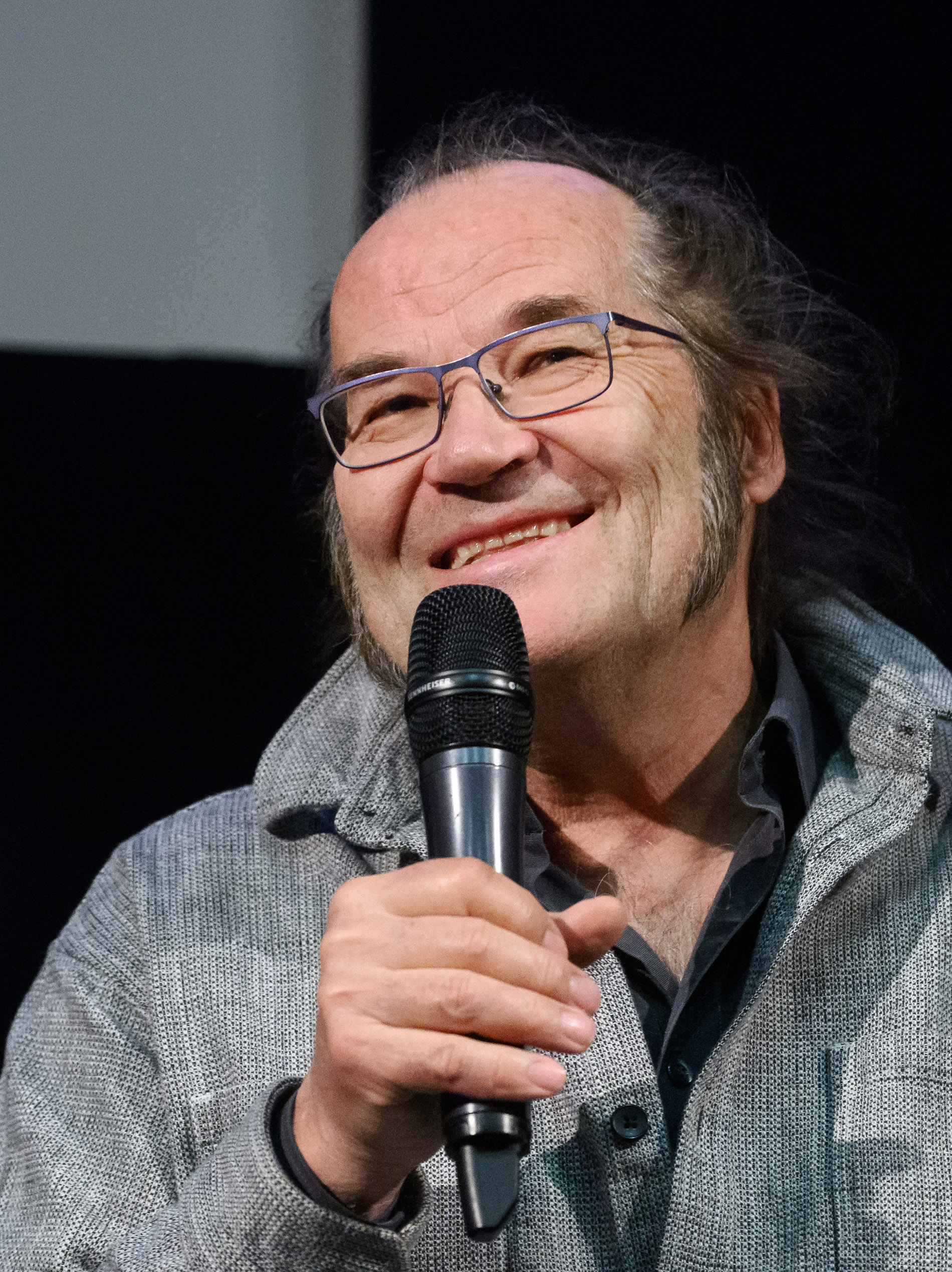
- Peter Zeitlinger (2026)
- Born: 6 June 1960 (age 66); Prague, Czechoslovakia

Peter Zeitlinger A.S.C. (born 6 June 1960) is an Austrian cinematographer. He has worked with the director Werner Herzog since 1995 and is best known for their collaborations, which have mainly been in documentary films.

== Life and career ==
Peter Zeitlinger studied from 1980 to 1987 at the University of Music and Performing Arts, Vienna. He was influenced by Michael Snow and Peter Kubelka, followed by Vittorio Storaro, Sven Nykvist, and Vilmos Zsigmond. He began working with Werner Herzog with the 1995 film Death for Five Voices, a documentary film about Carlo Gesualdo, and their first fictional film collaboration was Invincible in 2001.

Zeitlinger is a member of the German Film Academy and Professor of Cinematography at the University of Television and Film Munich. He lives in Premariacco, Italy.

== Work with Werner Herzog ==
- Death for Five Voices (1995)
- Little Dieter Needs to Fly (1997)
- Wings of Hope (1998)
- Invincible (2001)
- Wheel of Time (2003)
- Grizzly Man (2005)
- Rescue Dawn (2007)
- Encounters at the End of the World (2008)
- Bad Lieutenant: Port of Call New Orleans (2009)
- My Son, My Son, What Have Ye Done? (2009)
- Cave of Forgotten Dreams (2011)
- Into the Abyss (2011)
- From One Second to the Next (2013)
- Queen of the Desert (2015)
- Lo and Behold (2016)
- Into the Inferno (2016)
- Salt and Fire (2016)
- Fireball (2020)
- Bucking Fastard (2026)

== Other features ==
- Tommaso (2019) dir. Abel Ferrara
- Pretenders (2018) dir. James Franco
- Future World (2017) dir. James Franco
- Fear of the Idyll (Die Angst vor der Idylle) (1996) dir. Götz Spielmann
- Bilder einer Ausstellung (TV film, 1996) dir. Ulrich Seidl
- Animal Love (1995) dir. Ulrich Seidl
- Der Nachbar (1993) dir. Götz Spielmann
- Dieses naive Verlangen (1993) dir. Götz Spielmann
- Loss Is to Be Expected (Mit Verlust ist zu rechnen) (1992) dir. Ulrich Seidl
- Good News (1990) dir. Ulrich Seidl
- Erwin und Julia (1990) dir. Götz Spielmann
- Abschied von Hölderlin (1985) dir. Götz Spielmann
- Foreign Land (1983) dir. Götz Spielmann

== Awards ==
- "Golden Frog" cinematographer - director duo award(2023)
- "Golden Frog" nominated for Best Cinematography (2022)
- "Golden Frog" nominated 3D competition (2013)
- "German Cinematography Award" for Best Cinematography (2012)
- "Romy (TV award)" for Best Cinematography (2013)
- "Independent Spirit Award" nominated for Best Cinematography (2010)
- "Cinema Eye Honors" for Best Cinematography (2009)
- "Romy (TV award)" for Best Cinematography (2007)
