= World Livestock Auctioneer Championship =

The World Livestock Auctioneer Championship is an annual competition of livestock auctioneers who practice the auction chant typical of rural areas in the United States and Canada. The competition is sponsored by the Livestock Marketing Association and was first held in 1963. Brian Curless won the competition in 2017. Jace Thompson is the current World Livestock Auctioneer Champion.

The 1976 competition was featured in Werner Herzog's film How Much Wood Would a Woodchuck Chuck.
