= Ten Minutes Older =

2002 anthology film

- DVD release cover
- Written by: Víctor Erice; Werner Herzog; Jim Jarmusch; Aki Kaurismäki; Wim Wenders; Tan Zhang
- Release date: 2002
- Countries: China, Finland, France, Germany, Netherlands, Spain, United Kingdom, United States
- Languages: English, Finnish, French, German, Hungarian, Russian, Italian, Hindi, Mandarin, Spanish
- Box office: $76,599

Ten Minutes Older is a 2002 film project consisting of two compilation feature films titled The Trumpet and The Cello. The project was conceived by the producer Nicolas McClintock as a reflection on the theme of time at the turn of the Millennium. Fifteen celebrated filmmakers were invited to create their own vision of what time means in ten minutes of film. The music for the compilations was composed by Paul Englishby, and performed by Hugh Masekela (trumpet) and Claudio Bohorques (cello).

The Trumpet was first screened in the Un Certain Regard section at the 2002 Cannes Film Festival. The Cello was premiered in the official Venice Film Festival 2002. Both films released internationally.

The two films are dedicated to Herz Frank and Juris Podnieks (Camera) who made the 1978 short film, Ten Minutes Older. The original film and the feature film have been shown together on numerous occasions, including the Yamagata Film Festival in 2004, and the Spanish documentary film festival Punto de Vista in 2006.

== Ten Minutes Older: The Trumpet ==
Directed by:

- Aki Kaurismäki (segment "Dogs Have No Hell")
- Víctor Erice (segment "Lifeline")
- Werner Herzog (segment "Ten Thousand Years Older")
- Jim Jarmusch (segment "Int. Trailer. Night.")
- Wim Wenders (segment "Twelve Miles to Trona")
- Spike Lee (segment "We Wuz Robbed")
- Chen Kaige (segment "100 Flowers Hidden Deep")

== Ten Minutes Older: The Cello ==
Directed by:

- Bernardo Bertolucci (segment "Histoire d'eaux")
- Mike Figgis (segment "About Time 2")
- Jirí Menzel (segment "One Moment")
- István Szabó (segment "Ten Minutes After")
- Claire Denis (segment "Vers Nancy")
- Volker Schlöndorff (segment "The Enlightenment")
- Michael Radford (segment "Addicted to the Stars")
- Jean-Luc Godard (segment "Dans le noir du temps")

== See also ==
- List of American films of 2002
