= Fata Morgana (1971 film) =

West German documentary film

- Screenshot from the sequence "Scientist with Monitor Lizard"
- Directed by: Werner Herzog
- Written by: Werner Herzog
- Produced by: Werner Herzog
- Narrated by: Lotte H. Eisner; Wolfgang Büchler; Manfred Eigendorf
- Cinematography: Jörg Schmidt-Reitwein
- Edited by: Beate Mainka-Jellinghaus
- Music by: Blind Faith; Third Ear Band; Leonard Cohen
- Production company: Werner Herzog Filmproduktion
- Release date: 19 April 1971
- Running time: 79 minutes
- Country: West Germany
- Language: German

Fata Morgana is a 1971 film by Werner Herzog, shot in 1968 and 1969, which captures mirages in the Sahara and Sahel deserts. Herzog also wrote the narration by Lotte H. Eisner, which recounts the Mayan creation myth, the Popol Vuh.

== Production ==
The film was shot between November 1968 and December 1969. At the time of filming, Herzog had little ideas as to its eventual use, only developing a concept and structure for the film after shooting was completed. Post-production continued into 1970, as Herzog was completing his Even Dwarfs Started Small for a May premiere at the Cannes Film Festival. Much of the film's footage consists of long tracking shots filmed by cameraman Jörg Schmidt-Reitwein from the top of a Volkswagen camper van with Herzog driving. The crew smoothed out the road themselves to prepare the shots.

Filming was problematic: in Cameroon the crew were imprisoned because cameraman Schmidt-Reitwein's name was similar to the name of a German mercenary who was hiding from the authorities and had recently been sentenced to death in absentia. They also encountered sandstorms and floods. Filming was interrupted when they were forced to abandon their truck and equipment at a border crossing. Herzog said of the arduous filming conditions: "It forces real life, genuine life into the film." During the course of filming, Herzog himself was briefly imprisoned, experiencing beatings and contracting bilharzia.

The film was initially intended to be presented with a science fiction narrative, casting the images as landscapes of a dying planet. This concept was abandoned as soon as filming began, but was realized in Herzog's later films Lessons of Darkness and The Wild Blue Yonder. Herzog has said of the film that it takes place "on the planet Uxmal, which is discovered by creatures from the Andromeda nebula, who make a film report about it." The images and narration are combined with an eclectic soundtrack which features works by Handel, Mozart and Couperin, as well as Blind Faith, Leonard Cohen and the British Third Ear Band.

== Synopsis ==
The film is in three parts: Part I - Creation, Part II - Paradise and Part III - The Golden Age. In Creation, the writer and critic, Lotte H. Eisner narrates a version of Popol Vuh the creation myth of the Mayan people, written by Herzog. Eisner, author of a book on German cinema, The Haunted Screen, had praised Herzog's first film Signs of Life (1968), and her casting was a reciprocal tribute to the woman he once called his "most important inner support".

The film has been described as follows:

The planet Uxmal is discovered by beings from the Andromeda Nebula. They produce a cinematic report in three parts. "The Creation": a plane lands, primeval landscapes unfold, burning vents and oil tanks come into the picture. "Paradise": in the grip of nature and the remains of a civilization, people talk about the disaster. "The Golden Age": a brothel singer and a matron sing. All three parts end with the greatest of all hallucinations, a mirage.

== Reception and legacy ==
The film was premiered at the 1970 Cannes Film Festival. Herzog himself has stated that upon its first release, the film was greeted with hostility "almost everywhere". It was released commercially, by the Werner Herzog Filmproduktion, on 19 April 1971. Herzog said "...when [Fata Morgana] was finally released, it was a big success with young people who had taken various drugs and was seen as one of the first European art-house psychedelic films, which of course it has no connection with at all."

Many of the images used in Fata Morgana would appear in Herzog's later work: the vehicle aimlessly turning circles recurs in Even Dwarfs Started Small (1970) and Stroszek (1977); the decaying animal carcasses reappear in Cobra Verde (1987); the welding goggles are worn by the two blind inmates in Even Dwarfs Started Small; and the image of the temple in the desert is used in Kaspar's dream of the Caucasus in The Enigma of Kaspar Hauser. Herzog himself described the film as "an hallucination".

Reviewing the film for The New York Times in 1971, Vincent Canby said:

... Werner Herzog, the young German director of "Fata Morgana", is obviously not suggesting anything as engaged, or as engaging, as a Save‐the-Sahara campaign. His film simply uses the Sahara as the background for his own vision of man's compulsion to corrupt and debase himself, as well as the world in which he lives.

Fata Morgana is considered a key picture in Herzog's filmography, giving insight into many of his subsequent works. It has also been regarded as "one of modern cinema's key films." Its influence has lasted and the 1997 film Gummo by Harmony Korine has been called a "direct descendant" of Fata Morgana. Its influence is also visible in the work of directors such as Terrence Malick and Claire Denis.

In December 2013 the film was screened by West Hollywood's Cinefamily with a live performance by American drone metal band Earth.

== Chapter points ==
Part One: Die Schöpfung ("Creation")

1. Desert Landscapes
2. Plane Wreck
3. Civilization in the desert
4. Boy with desert animal
5. City in the Hills

Part Two: Das Paradies ("Paradise")

1. Old man with medals
2. Scientist with Monitor Lizard
3. Sea Turtle
4. The 'Blitzkrieg' is Insanity

Part Three: Das Goldene Zeitalter ("The Golden Age*)

1. What can we learn from the turtle
2. Musical duo
3. Landscapes from the air
4. Mirage

== Soundtrack (partial) ==
- "Coronation Mass" (Kyrie) - Mozart
- "Ghetto Raga" - Third Ear Band
- "Hey, That's No Way to Say Goodbye" - Leonard Cohen
- "Suzanne" - Leonard Cohen
- "So Long, Marianne" - Leonard Cohen
- "Sea of Joy" - Blind Faith
- "Sweet Potato" (Booker T. Jones) - John Renbourn
