= Even Dwarfs Started Small =

1970 film

- American Theatrical release poster
- Directed by: Werner Herzog
- Written by: Werner Herzog
- Produced by: Werner Herzog
- Starring: Helmut Döring
- Cinematography: Thomas Mauch
- Edited by: Beate Mainka-Jellinghaus
- Music by: Florian Fricke
- Production company: Werner Herzog Filmproduktion
- Distributed by: Werner Herzog Filmproduktion
- Release dates: 15 May 1970 (Cannes); 2 February 1971 (West Germany); 15 December 1971 (US)
- Running time: 96 minutes
- Country: West Germany
- Language: German
- Budget: $200,000

Even Dwarfs Started Small (German: Auch Zwerge haben klein angefangen) is a 1970 West German absurdist comedy-drama film written, produced, and directed by Werner Herzog.

== Plot ==
Dwarfs confined in an institution on a remote island rebel against the guards and director, also dwarfs, in a display of mayhem. They gleefully break windows and dishes, cackle maniacally, abandon a running truck to drive itself in circles, engineer food fights and cock fights, look at pin-up magazines, set fire to pots of flowers, kill a large pig, torment some blind dwarfs, and perform a mock crucifixion of a monkey.

== Cast ==
- Helmut Döring as Hombré
- Paul Glauer as Erzieher
- Gisela Hertwig as Pobrecita
- Hertel Minkner as Chicklets
- Gertrud Piccini as Piccini
- Marianne Saar as Theresa
- Brigitte Saar as Cochina
- Gerd Gickel as Pepe
- Erna Gschwendtner as Azucar

== Production ==
The film was shot on the Canary Islands, at Lanzarote. It was produced during the same time period as Herzog's Fata Morgana and The Flying Doctors of East Africa, and there are visual and thematic connections between the three works. Notably, the goggles worn by the blind dwarfs are the same style as the goggles which several people wear in Fata Morgana.

During the filming, Herzog gave some surprising stage directions to elicit particular performances from the actors. In directing one dwarf who continually struggled not to laugh, Herzog repeatedly told the actor that he must not laugh, but then made funny faces at him as soon as he started filming.

While filming the scene where a van drives in circles with no one at the wheel, one of the actors was run over, but immediately stood up uninjured. During the flower burning scene, the same actor caught fire and Werner Herzog raced over and beat the fire out. The actor only had minor injuries from the fire. After these two accidents, Herzog promised the actors that if they made it through the rest of filming without any more injuries he would jump into a cactus patch and allow the actors to film him doing so. The film was finished without any further injuries and the director made good his promise and dived into the cacti. Herzog has said, "Getting out was a lot more difficult than jumping in." The vehicle-in-circles scene was inspired by an incident that occurred when Herzog worked as a steward at the Munich Oktoberfest as a young man. Part of his duty was ensuring that drunk patrons did not attempt to drive their cars home, so when a drunk man insisted that he was capable of driving, Herzog got into his car with him, placed the steering wheel on full lock, then got out of his car. The man passed out and the car continued to drive in a circle until it ran out of petrol. This situation was repeated at the end Herzog's 1977 film Stroszek.

== Reception ==
Even Dwarfs Started Small has a 100% approval rating on Rotten Tomatoes based on 8 reviews.
