= Thomas Mauch =

German cinematographer and film producer (born 1937)

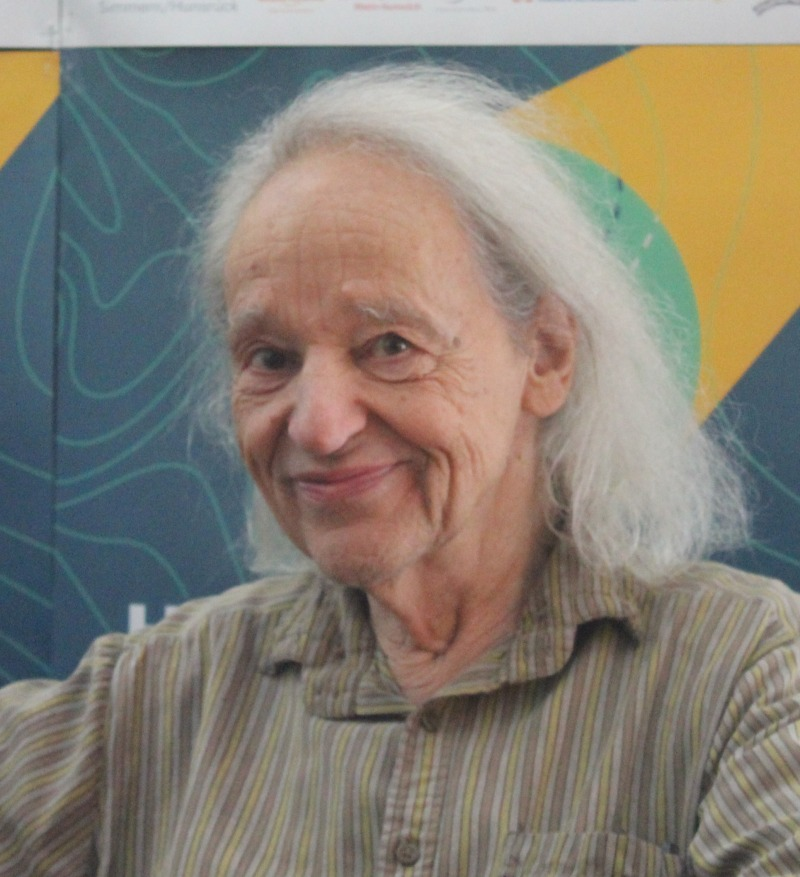
- in September 2022
- Born: 4 April 1937 (age 89); Heidenheim, Germany
- Occupations: Cinematographer; film producer
- Years active: 1959–present

Thomas Mauch (born 4 April 1937) is a German cinematographer and film producer. With a career that spans over fifty years in both film and television, Mauch is well known for his numerous collaborations with Edgar Reitz, Alexander Kluge, and Werner Herzog.

== Selected filmography ==
Year	Film	Notes
1968	Signs of Life	
1970	Even Dwarfs Started Small	
1970	The Flying Doctors of East Africa	TV movie documentary
1972	Aguirre, the Wrath of God	
1976	How Much Wood Would a Woodchuck Chuck	
1977	Stroszek	
1981	Desperado City	
1982	Fitzcarraldo	
1983	The Power of Emotion	
1985	The Assault of the Present on the Rest of Time	
1989	Waller's Last Trip	
1995	I.D.	
2006	Warchild	

== Awards ==
- Deutscher Filmpreis - Best Cinematography (1973, 1979, 1989)
- National Society of Film Critics - Best Cinematography (1977)
