= Signs of Life (1968 film) =

1968 film

- Directed by: Werner Herzog
- Written by: Werner Herzog
- Produced by: Werner Herzog
- Starring: Peter Brogle; Wolfgang Reichmann; Athina Zacharopoulou; Wolfgang von Ungern-Sternberg
- Cinematography: Thomas Mauch
- Edited by: Beate Mainka-Jellinghaus
- Music by: Stavros Xarhakos
- Release dates: June 1968 (Berlin Film Festival); July 5, 1968 (Germany)
- Running time: 87 minutes
- Country: West Germany
- Language: German

Signs of Life (German: Lebenszeichen) is a 1968 feature film written, directed, and produced by Werner Herzog. It was his first feature film, and his first major commercial and critical success. The story is roughly based on the short story "Der Tolle Invalide auf dem Fort Ratonneau" by Achim von Arnim.

== Plot ==
During World War II, three German soldiers are assigned to guard a depot of unusable munitions in an old fort in a small coastal community on the Greek island of Kos. One, Stroszek, has been given this tranquil role as he had been wounded. He has married a local woman who nursed him, Nora, and she lives with them and cooks for them. The men become increasingly stir crazy in their monotonous assignment, with almost no interactions, activities or duties. Stroszek behaves increasingly erratically and eventually starts shooting at people and threatening to detonate the depot.

== Cast ==
- Peter Brogle - Stroszek
- Wolfgang Reichmann - Meinhard
- Athina Zacharopoulou - Nora
- Wolfgang von Ungern-Sternberg - Becker
- Wolfgang Stumpf - Captain
- Henry van Lyck - Lieutenant
- Julio Pinheiro - Gypsy
- Florian Fricke - Pianist
- Heinz Usener - Doctor
- Achmed Hafiz - Greek resident

== Production ==
The fortress which gives the film's main setting is a real 14th-century fortress built by the Knights Hospitaller. Herzog's grandfather, Rudolf Herzog, lived and worked for several years as an archaeologist at this site, and published translations of the ancient Greek engravings which appear in the film. The old Turkish man who appears in the film with a written translation was the last surviving worker from Rudolf Herzog's archaeological project.

During several shots, Peter Brogle could only be filmed from the waist up after he had been injured in a tight-rope accident and spent several months in a walking cast. The man who appears as a pianist in one scene is keyboardist Florian Fricke of Popol Vuh, who composed and performed the music for many of Herzog's later films.

== Themes ==
Many of Herzog's later films reference elements of Signs of Life. Stroszek includes a scene with a hypnotized chicken and the main character's name is reused. The Wild Blue Yonder contains a shot of a valley of windmills.

== Critical responses ==
The film was entered into the 18th Berlin International Film Festival, where it won the Silver Bear Extraordinary Prize of the Jury. The film won a German Film Award.

Signs of Life has a 91% approval rating on Rotten Tomatoes.
