= Jörg Schmidt-Reitwein =

German cinematographer

- Born: 21 February 1939; Königs Wusterhausen, Nazi Germany
- Died: 21 August 2023 (aged 84); Ering, Bavaria, Germany .
- Occupation: Cinematographer

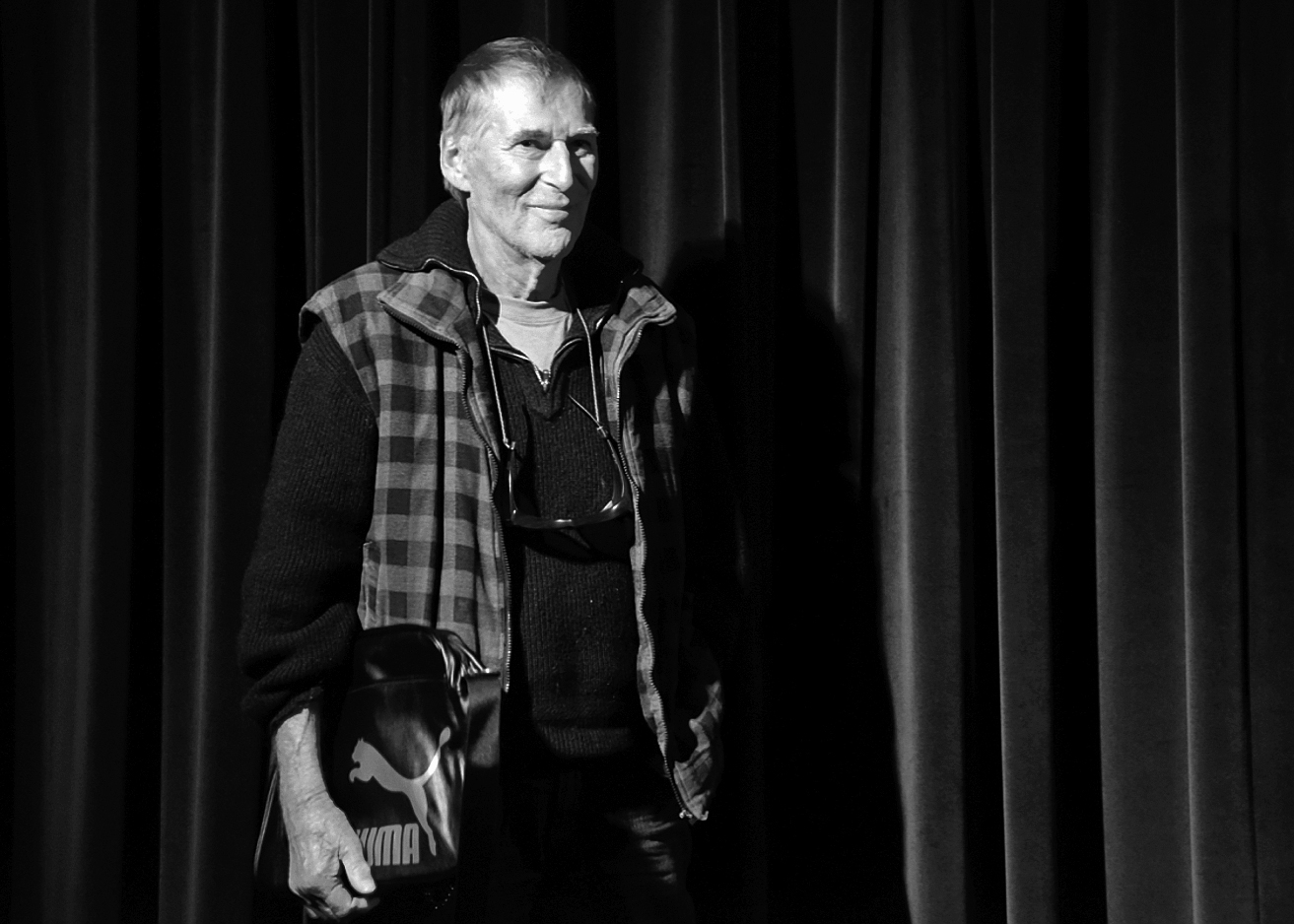
Jörg Schmidt-Reitwein in 2017

Jörg Schmidt-Reitwein (21 February 1939 – 21 August 2023) was a German cinematographer. He collaborated with director Werner Herzog on a number of projects. Among his many collaborations with other directors, Schmidt-Reitwein is known for shooting Alan Greenberg's acclaimed 1982 documentary about Jamaica and death of Bob Marley, Land of Look Behind.

== Biography ==
=== Early life and family ===
The son of painter Karl Schmidt-Reitwein, Jörg Schmidt-Reitwein was raised in Lübeck. His mother Barbara was the niece of Edvard Munchs patron Max Linde and painters Hermann Linde and Heinrich Linde-Walther.

=== Early career ===
After attending Waldorf school, Schmidt-Reitwein studied physics for a few semesters in Lübeck, before moving to Berlin in 1959 to pursue a career in film. His career stalled when he was arrested in East Berlin after being falsely accused of attempting to smuggle his girlfriend to West Berlin. Sentenced to five years imprisonment, he was released after three years when the West German government negotiated his freedom against 84,000 DM worth of butter.

=== Career as a cinematographer ===
Following his release from prison, Schmidt-Reitwein worked as a camera assistant in Munich. In 1969 Werner Herzog offered him the chance to work on a documentary feature film as director of photography. The film Fata Morgana was widely praised by critics. Schmidt-Reitwein worked with Herzog on 17 more movies and documentary films. He also worked with several well known directors including Douglas Sirk, Alexander Kluge, Herbert Achternbusch, Josef Bierbichler, H.C. Blumenberg, Werner Schroeter, Alan Greenberg, Valie Export, Doris Dörrie, Jochen Kuhn, Markus Fischer, Douglas Wolfsperger and Andre Heller. He earned two German Film Prize trophies awarded in gold for his light speciality on two films he collaborated with Werner Herzog.

Schmidt-Reitwein had worked in the Ludwigsburg Film Academy and the Film Academy of the University of the Philippines in Manila as a Lecturer.

He also worked for TV, shooting commercials for Nike, DHL, MasterCard, Swiss Com and Mercedes-Benz.

== Personal life ==
Schmidt-Reitwein was the father of five children. From his first marriage with Erika Kaul he is the father to his oldest daughter Iris Maria (b. 1966), from his second marriage with Susanne Rupprecht to son Tobias and daughters Lara and Lisa. Together with his third wife he has raised his youngest daughter Ana.

At the end of his life he lived on a remote farm near Münchham, Ering, Lower Bavaria, Germany .

== Filmography (incomplete) ==
- Fata Morgana
- The Great Ecstasy of Woodcarver Steiner
- The Enigma of Kaspar Hauser
- Nosferatu the Vampyre
- Heart of Glass
- Woyzeck
- Land of Look Behind
- Where the Green Ants Dream
- Marmorera
- Wie zwischen Himmel und Erde
- Land of Silence and Darkness

== Awards ==
- 2 Federal Film Awards (Film ribbon in gold)
- 2 nominations for the German Camera Prize
- 1 nomination for the Festival de l image de Film (Chalon sur Soune)
- Jury member Camerimage Filmfestival 2001
- First Prize for DOP work on FANTASY FILM FESTIVAL 2007 in Málaga (Spain)
- Honorary Award of the 11th edition of the Muestra de Cine de Lanzarote, 2018
