= Beate Mainka-Jellinghaus =

German film editor

Beate Mainka-Jellinghaus (born 27 July 1936) is a German film editor who was a member of the New German Cinema movement and is noted particularly for her many films with director Werner Herzog. Between 1966 and 1986, she was credited on more than twenty-five feature films and feature-length documentaries.

== Early life, family and education ==
Beate Mainka-Jellinghaus is the daughter of Hildegard (née Farbowski) and George Mainka, a bank official. She was born in the village of Vogt, near Oppeln, which was then a part of Germany. At the end of the Second World War she and her parents left Oppeln, which became part of Poland; they relocated to Ansbach. She was musically inclined, and her secondary school education from 1946 to 1951 included ballet instruction and acting; following her graduation in 1951, she attended a private film school in Wiesbaden to train as a film editor.

== Careers ==
After schooling, Mainka worked for five months in a copy center, and became involved as an editorial assistant in the production of short documentary films by Harry Piel. In 1955, Mainka moved to Munich, where she worked at Bavaria Film as an assistant film editor, working with editor Anna Höllering on several feature films directed by Rolf Hansen. Her first credit as an editor was for the television production Ein gewisser Judas (A Certain Judas) (1958), which was the only film directed by Oskar Werner (under the pseudonym "Erasmus Nothnagel").

In 1959 she became acquainted with director Edgar Reitz, with whom she worked on short documentaries through about 1966. Reitz introduced her to the director Alexander Kluge; Reitz, Kluge, and Mainka became early exponents of the New German Cinema. Mainka's long collaboration with Kluge began with Porträt einer Bewährung (Policeman's Lot) (1964), and extended through 1986, including the films Yesterday Girl (1966) and Artists Under the Big Top: Perplexed (1968).

In 1967 and 1968 Mainka-Jellinghaus taught film editing at the Ulm School of Design, where she was a member of the Institut für Filmgestaltung (Institute for Film Design) founded by Edgar Reitz and Alexander Kluge. Starting with the 1968 film Signs of Life, Mainka-Jellinghaus worked with director Werner Herzog on twenty films, including several of Herzog's best-known films such as Aguirre, the Wrath of God (1972) and Fitzcarraldo (1982). Her last film with Herzog was Where the Green Ants Dream (1984).

Following her final film with Kluge, Miscellaneous News (1986), she retired into private life; the New German Cinema era was over.

Mainka-Jellinghaus is among the editors interviewed for the 2006 documentary Schnitte in Raum und Zeit (Cutting in Space and Time), which was produced by Gabriele Voss.

== Awards ==
- 1975: German Film Awards Gold Film Ribbon for Best Editing for The Enigma of Kaspar Hauser (directed by Werner Herzog) and for In Danger and Deep Distress, The Middleway Spells Certain Death (directed by Alexander Kluge).
- 1978: Gold Film Ribbon for Film Design for Germany in Autumn
- 1978: Special Recognition award (shared) at the 28th Berlin International Film Festival for Germany in Autumn

== See also ==
- List of film director and editor collaborations. Twenty films from 1968 to 1984 with director Werner Herzog; Fitzcarraldo was nominated for the BAFTA Award for Best Foreign Film.
