= The Fire Within: A Requiem for Katia and Maurice Krafft =

2022 documentary film directed by Werner Herzog

- Poster
- Directed by: Werner Herzog
- Written by: Werner Herzog
- Produced by: Peter Lown, Jess Winteringham, Mandy Leith, Julien Dumont, Alexandre Soullier
- Narrated by: Werner Herzog
- Edited by: Marco Capalbo
- Music by: Ernst Reijseger
- Production companies: Titan Films; Brian Leith Productions; Bonne Pioche
- Release dates: 29 July 2022 (UK); 25 August 2022 (Australia)
- Running time: 81 minutes
- Language: English

The Fire Within: A Requiem for Katia and Maurice Krafft is a 2022 documentary film directed by Werner Herzog. The film is a tribute to the French volcanologists Katia and Maurice Krafft, who were killed on 3 June 1991, by a pyroclastic flow on Mount Unzen, in Japan.

== Content ==
The film is a celebration of the imagery captured by volcanologists Katia and Maurice Krafft. Designed as a 'requiem', the film is a non-traditional biography with long sections of volcano footage supported by music and sparse narration.

== Production ==
The film originated from a concept by producer Peter Lown and Professor Clive Oppenheimer. It was originally commissioned to Brian Leith Productions as a feature documentary for Arte until Oppenheimer introduced the team to Werner Herzog at Sheffield International Documentary Festival (Sheffield DocFest) in 2019. Herzog, who had already featured the Kraffts in Into The Inferno, revealed that he had long wanted to make a film about them too. Herzog agreed to direct the movie but insisted that it must be a 'requiem'. The film was eventually co-funded by A&E Networks and went into production in 2021, with Bonne Pioche and Titan Films joining the production.

== Release ==
The film premiered at Sheffield DocFest in 2022. It won best documentary at Shanghai International Film Festival in 2023. It was also screened in October 2022 at the 60th Viennale as part of the celebration of Herzog's 80th birthday and at Telluride Film Festival.

== Critical reception ==
On the review aggregator website Rotten Tomatoes, 88% of 8 critics' reviews are positive, with an average rating of 6.00/10. A review on the website Cineuropa comments: "Rather than shoot a straightforward documentary, the director opted to arrange the couple’s footage like a “musical”. Unlike Fire of Love by Sara Dosa, Herzog's film is meant to be a requiem to them, fueled by heavy instrumental and choral music." The Telegraph found the film "mesmerising" and gave it 3 stars out of 5.

== Related Werner Herzog films ==
- La Soufrière, a 1977 documentary film about the La Grande Soufrière volcano in Guadeloupe.
- Salt and Fire, a 2016 thriller film about the imminent eruption of a supervolcano in Bolivia.
- Into the Inferno, a 2016 documentary film exploring active volcanoes in Vanuatu, Indonesia, Iceland and Ethiopia.

== See also ==
- Fire of Love, another 2022 film about Katia and Maurice Krafft, directed by Sara Dosa
