= Harry Glicken =

American geologist and volcanologist

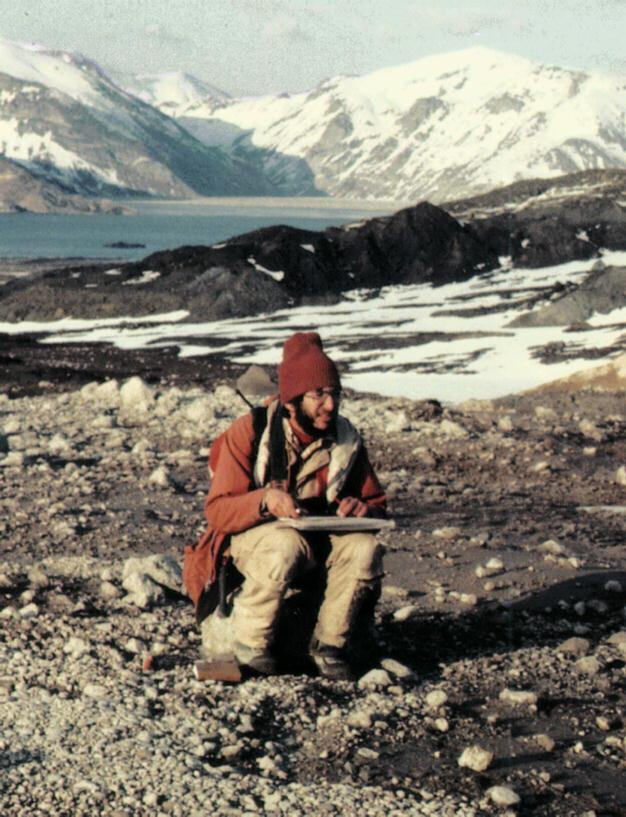
- Glicken at work, 1980s
- Born: March 7, 1958; United States
- Died: June 3, 1991 (aged 33); Kitakamikobamachi (near Mount Unzen), Shimabara, Nagasaki, Japan (32°45′09.5″N 130°20′14.1″E)
- Cause of death: Killed in a pyroclastic flow during the eruption of Mount Unzen
- Education: Stanford University; University of California, Santa Barbara

Harry Glicken (March 7, 1958 – June 3, 1991) was an American volcanologist. He researched Mount St. Helens in the United States before and after its 1980 eruption, and was very distraught about the death of volcanologist David A. Johnston, who was Glicken's mentor and supervisor in Spring 1980 at Mount St. Helens. Glicken was initially assigned to the USGS observation post in the weeks leading up to the eruption but had to leave the night before the eruption, in order to attend a work appointment.

In 1991, while conducting avalanche research on Mount Unzen in Japan, Glicken and fellow volcanologists Katia and Maurice Krafft were killed by a pyroclastic flow. His remains were found four days later and were cremated in accordance with his parents' request. Glicken and Johnston remain the only American volcanologists known to have died in volcanic eruptions.

Despite a long-term interest in working for the United States Geological Survey, Glicken never received a permanent post there because there was a hiring freeze for federal agencies when he graduated with his PhD. While conducting research from sponsorships granted by the National Science Foundation and other organizations, Glicken accrued expertise in the field of volcanic debris avalanches. He also wrote several major publications on the topic, including his doctoral dissertation based on his research at Mount St. Helens titled "Rockslide-debris Avalanche of May 18, 1980, Mount St. Helens Volcano, Washington" that initiated widespread interest in the phenomenon.

Since being published posthumously by Glicken's colleagues in 1996, the report has been acknowledged by many other publications on debris avalanches. Following his death, Glicken was praised by associates for his love of volcanoes and commitment to his field.

== Life and career ==
=== Early work ===
Glicken was born in 1958 to Milton and Ida Glicken. He graduated from Stanford University in 1980. Later that year, while a graduate student at the University of California, Santa Barbara, he was temporarily hired by the United States Geological Survey (USGS) to help monitor the volcano Mount St. Helens in Washington state. St. Helens, dormant since the 1840s and 1850s, resumed activity in March 1980.

As seismic and volcanic activity increased, volcanologists working for the USGS in its Vancouver branch prepared to observe any impending eruption. Geologist Don Swanson and others placed reflectors on and around the growing lava domes, and, on May 1, 1980, established the Coldwater I and II observation posts to use laser ranging to measure how the distances to these reflectors changed over time as the domes deformed. Glicken monitored the volcano for two weeks, taking shelter in a trailer at the Coldwater II site located a little more than 5 miles (8 km) northwest of the volcano.

On May 18, 1980, after working for six days straight, Glicken took the day off to attend an interview for his graduate work with his professor, Richard V. Fisher, in Mammoth Lakes, California. His research adviser and mentor David A. Johnston replaced him at his post, despite expressing concerns about its safety given indications of mobile magma within the volcano. After a magnitude 5.1 earthquake centered directly below the north slope triggered that part of the volcano to slide at 8:32 a.m., Mount St. Helens erupted. Johnston was killed after he was enveloped by swift pyroclastic flows that accelerated down the mountain's flanks traveling at least 300 miles per hour (480 kilometers per hour).

After the eruption, Glicken went to Toutle High School, the center for relief efforts, where he joined Air Force Reserve Rescue Squadron officials in a helicopter to look for Johnston or any sign of his post. Despite searching with three separate crews over a span of nearly six hours, Glicken found no trace. He attempted to enlist a fourth helicopter crew to aid his search, but they declined, fearing dangerous conditions. In his distraught state, Glicken refused to accept Johnston's death, and had to be comforted by Swanson before calming down.

In mid-1980, after the May eruption, USGS Survey scientists decided to establish the David A. Johnston Cascades Volcano Observatory (CVO) in Vancouver, intending to closely monitor volcanoes in Oregon, Washington, and Idaho. Glicken returned to St. Helens hoping to join the 'autopsy' team. However, every aspect of the eruption had been claimed by different survey scientists, and as a doctoral student at UC Santa Barbara studying with Richard Fisher, Glicken was not a survey employee.

Instead, he found work with newly appointed Survey employee Barry Voight, a specialist in landslides. Under Voight's guidance, Glicken absorbed himself in his work, motivated to earn a job at the Survey, and to relieve some of his anguish over Johnston's death. Glicken and a team of geologists mapped the debris field left over from St. Helens's structural collapse, which consisted of roughly a quarter of the mass of the volcano. Through extensive, meticulous analysis, the team traced the origins and the means of movement of each piece of debris, ranging from blocks 100 yards (91 m) in width to mere fragments.

With his group, Glicken compiled a landmark study in the field of volcanic landslides, establishing the principle that tall volcanoes have a tendency to collapse. The study garnered praise for its unique conclusions and attention to detail, inspiring volcanologists to identify similar deposit mounds at volcanoes around the world. After the findings from his dissertation were published in several shorter articles throughout the 1980s, Glicken earned recognition as the first geologist to explain the creation of hummock fields near tall volcanoes.

=== Research after St. Helens and death ===
In the years following the eruption, activity at Mount St. Helens diminished, prompting USGS to reduce CVO's budget and contemplate closing the station. Glicken continued helping the Survey until 1989, also serving as an assistant researcher at the University of California at Santa Barbara.

From 1989 to 1991, Glicken continued his volcanological studies in Japan as a postdoctoral fellow at the Earthquake Research Institute of the University of Tokyo, supported by grants from the U.S. National Science Foundation. Later, while a research professor and translator at Tokyo Metropolitan University, Glicken became involved with research at Mount Unzen. The volcano had recently resumed eruptive activity in November 1990, after being dormant for 198 years. In the months after its first activity, it erupted sporadically, and the government evacuated its vicinity near the end of May 1991.

On June 2, 1991, Glicken visited the mountain with Katia and Maurice Krafft. The three entered a danger zone near the base of the volcano the following day, assuming that any potentially hazardous pyroclastic flows would follow a turn in the landscape and safely bypass them. Later that day, a lava dome collapsed, sending a large flow down the valley at 60 miles per hour (97 km/h). The current reached the turn before separating into two parts, and the upper, hotter part swiftly overcame the volcanologists' post, killing them upon impact.

In total, 41 or 42 people died in the incident, including press members who had been watching the volcanologists. The volcano burned down 390 houses, and the remains of the flow extended 2.5 miles (4 km) in length. Glicken's remains were found four days later, and were cremated according to his parents' wishes. To date, Glicken and Johnston are the only American volcanologists known to have been killed by a volcanic eruption.

=== Posthumous report ===
At the time of his death, Glicken had been seeking to publish his doctoral dissertation in one piece, having earlier published elements as shorter articles. He had already defined the criteria for debris avalanches on the slopes of volcanoes, and authored several publications on the subject; Swanson named him one of the foremost experts in the field. After the 1980 eruption of Mount St. Helens, research in the niche area grew as more studies identified debris at well-known volcanoes. His work on flows at Mount St. Helens is considered the most complete in the field to date. It was later published in 1996 as a single report by his acquaintances Carol Ostengren, John Costa, Dan Dzurisin, and Jon Major, among others, at the United States Geological Survey. In his preface to Glicken's publication, Major comments that "the Mount St. Helens deposit will never be mapped in such detail again."

Glicken's report is titled "Rockslide-debris Avalanche of May 18, 1980, Mount St. Helens Volcano, Washington". It comprises his extensive laboratory and field work, supplemented by photographs of the eruption, writings that describe St. Helens before the eruption, and references to previous publications, including Voight's work. In the report, Glicken constructed a map of the landslide deposit at a scale of 1:24000, followed by a lithologic map describing rock varieties at a scale of 1:12000. The report also provides a conclusion for the movement of each slide block, using photographs and other data to estimate the velocity of each landslide, describing the composition of each, and recounting the interactions between blocks.

== Tributes and legacy ==
Chatty, noted for being extremely sensitive, Glicken also paid meticulous attention to detail. One of his friends writes, "Harry was a character his whole life. ... Everyone who knew him was amazed he was such a good scientist." Regarding Glicken's driving habits, the same acquaintance describes him as "a cartoon character" who "would drive at full speed down the road, talking about whatever was important to him, and ... come to a four-way stoplight and he'd sail through it, never knowing he'd just gone through".

Glicken's father said in 1991 that his son died pursuing his passion, and that he was "totally absorbed" with volcanology. United States Geological Survey co-worker Don Peterson adds that Glicken was keen in his enthusiastic approach to observation, and praises his accomplishments throughout his career and as a graduate student. Speaking about Glicken's personal passion for his field, his mentor and professor Richard V. Fisher writes, "What happened at St. Helens is something that troubled [Glicken] deeply for a very long time, and, in a way, I think it made him even more dedicated than he was before."

Associate Robin Holcomb remarks that "Harry was very enthusiastic, very bright, and very ambitious, ambitious to do something worthwhile on volcanoes." Many studies have utilized Glicken's criteria for volcanic landslide recognition, and many subsequent papers on avalanches have acknowledged or referenced Glicken's 1996 report. Reflecting on Glicken's body of work, USGS employee Don Swanson names him as "a world leader in studies of volcanic debris avalanches".

Glicken was closely connected to the University of California, Santa Barbara, where he earned his doctorate and conducted research. To remember his association with the university, each year the Department of Earth Science awards an outstanding graduate geology student the "Harry Glicken Memorial Graduate Fellowship", established by the Harry Glicken Fund, which aims to support students "who will pursue research relating to the understanding of volcanic processes".

== Selected publications ==
Most of Glicken's published work centers around the 1980 eruption of Mount St. Helens. He also coauthored works with other volcanologists that focused on debris avalanches. Colleague Jon Major writes that "The full scope of Harry's work ... has never been published."

- "The 1980 eruptions of Mount St. Helens, Washington". USGS Professional Paper No. 1250. United States Geological Survey: 347–377. 1981.
- Meyer, William; Sabol, M.A; Glicken, H.X; Voight, Barry (1981). "The effects of ground water, slope stability, and seismic hazards on the stability of the South Fork Castle Creek blockage in the Mount St. Helens area, Washington". USGS Professional Paper No. 1345. Professional Paper. United States Geological Survey. doi:10.3133/pp1345.
- "The effects of ground water, slope stability, and seismic hazard on the stability of the South Fork Castle Creek blockage in the Mount St. Helens area, Washington". USGS Open File No. 84–624. United States Geological Survey. 1984.
- Glicken, Harry X.; Meyer, William; Sabol, Martha A. (1989). "Geology and ground-water hydrology of Spirit Lake blockage, Mount St. Helens, Washington, with implications for lake retention" (PDF). USGS Bulletin No. 1789. United States Geological Survey: 3. Bibcode:1989usgs.rept....3G. doi:10.3133/b1789.
