= David Rothery =

Geologist at the Open University

- Born: David A. Rothery
- Education: University of Cambridge (MA); Open University (PhD)
- Scientific career
- Workplaces: Open University
- Thesis: The evolution of Wuqbah block and the applications of remote sensing in the Oman ophiolite (1982)
- Doctoral advisors: Ian Graham Gass, Don Mallick
- Other academic advisors: Peter Francis (volcanologist), Steven A Drury
- Doctoral students: Clive Oppenheimer,
- Website: open.ac.uk/people/dar4

David A. Rothery is professor of planetary geosciences at the Open University, where he chairs a level 2 module Planetary Science and the Search for Life and a level 1 module Volcanoes, Earthquakes and Tsunamis. He serves on the Open University's Senate.

From 1999 to 2004 he worked on the Beagle2 project led by Colin Pillinger. In 2006 he was appointed U.K. lead scientist for the MIXS (Mercury Imaging X-ray Spectrometer) on the joint European Space Agency/JAXA mission to Mercury named BepiColombo. He leads the European Space Agency's Mercury Surface & Composition Working Group in preparation for the BepiColombo mission, which was successfully launched on 20 October 2018. He has been a guest several times on The Sky at Night, and is frequently featured or quoted in TV, radio, print and online news stories about planetary science, volcanic eruptions, earthquakes and tsunamis.

== Education ==
Rothery graduated with a degree in Geology from the University of Cambridge (Churchill College) in 1978, and completed his PhD in 1982 on applications of remote sensing in the Semail Ophiolite in Oman.

== Publications ==
- Moons: A Very Short Introduction
- Planets: A Very Short Introduction
- Planet Mercury: From Pale Pink Dot to Dynamic World.
- Volcanoes, Earthquakes and Tsunamis: A Complete Introduction
- Geology: A Complete Introduction
- Satellites of the Outer Planets: Worlds in Their Own Right
- An Introduction to the Solar System
- An Introduction to Astrobiology
