= Salt and Fire =

2016 film

- Theatrical release poster
- Directed by: Werner Herzog
- Screenplay by: Werner Herzog
- Based on: Aral by Tom Bissell
- Produced by: Michael Benaroya; Pablo Cruz; Werner Herzog; Nina Maag
- Starring: Michael Shannon; Veronica Ferres; Gael García Bernal
- Cinematography: Peter Zeitlinger
- Edited by: Joe Bini
- Music by: Ernst Reijseger
- Production companies: Arte France Cinéma; Benaroya Pictures; Canana Films; Skellig Rock
- Distributed by: XLrator Media (United States); Camino Filmverleih (Germany); Potemkine Films (France)
- Release dates: 12 June 2016 (Shanghai); 17 November 2016 (Germany); 7 December 2016 (France)
- Running time: 98 minutes
- Countries: United States; Germany; France
- Languages: English; Spanish

Salt and Fire is a 2016 thriller film written and directed by Werner Herzog. The film stars Michael Shannon, Veronica Ferres, and Gael García Bernal. It tells the story about a hostage-taking situation set against an ecological disaster in Bolivia. It had its premiere at the Shanghai International Film Festival. It was selected to be screened in the Special Presentations section at the 2016 Toronto International Film Festival.

== Plot ==
Three scientists (Dr. Laura Sommerfield, Dr. Fabio Cavani, and Dr. Arnold Meir) are sent to South America as part of a U.N. investigation into an ecological disaster of Salar de Uyuni. In the past, two rivers had been diverted for irrigation, but the effort failed, and the result was an ever growing toxic salt flat.

Upon landing, all three are kidnapped by the man who had become CEO (played by Michael Shannon) of the large international consortium held responsible for the ecological disaster. He seems both tormented by the disaster and uncertain of its significance in the larger scheme of things—for the nearby supervolcano, Uturunku, has begun to show a ground-lift in the areas around it, which may or may not be signs of an eruption in our time (if such a thing were to happen, and depending on the degree of the eruption, it could be a worldwide cataclysmic event).

The two male scientists are given food that induces extreme digestive distress to keep them out of the way. Meanwhile, Laura is taken to the middle of the salt flat and stranded near a rocky outcropping with two nearly blind children named Huascar and Atahualpa, the names of the last two pre-Columbian rulers of the Incan Empire, whose last independent acts were to go to war against each other. The three have been provided with enough food and water for a week, but it is uncertain whether or not they have been stranded for good.

Instead of trying to convince Dr. Sommerfield not to publish by argument, the CEO has staged the kidnapping and stranding of Sommerfield and the children with hope that it will drive home the emotional costs associated with the disaster, and that it would get her to publish a report that goes beyond statistics and figures. Later, the CEO reveals that the two children are his adoptive sons, and that their blindness is due to the disaster wrought by the CEO's own Consortium. Dr. Sommerfield is then given a first-class ticket to Rome, to visit the Santissima Trinità dei Monti convent (at the top of the Spanish Steps), which the CEO had always wanted to see, in order to view its cloister, which features an anamorphic fresco of Saint Francis of Paula praying under a tree. She urges the CEO to come with her instead of turning himself in, but he says he would be caught anyway.

== Cast ==
- Veronica Ferres as Dr. Laura Sommerfeld
- Michael Shannon as Matt Riley
- Lawrence Krauss as Krauss
- Gael García Bernal as Dr. Fabio Cavani
- Volker Michalowski as Dr. Arnold Meier
- Anita Briem as Flight Attendant
- Werner Herzog as Man with one story
- Lilly Krug as Passenger

== Production ==
The plot for the film was loosely inspired by Tom Bissell's short story "Aral". Werner Herzog wrote the screenplay in 5 days. The film was shot in Bolivia. It took 16 days to shoot the film in total.

== Release ==
The film had its premiere at the 2016 Shanghai International Film Festival. It was also screened at the 2016 Toronto International Film Festival, the 2016 Fantastic Fest, and the 2016 Zurich Film Festival. XLrator Media acquired the U.S. rights to the film. It was released in the United States on 7 April 2017.

== Reception ==
On review aggregator Rotten Tomatoes, the film holds an approval rating of 31% based on 39 reviews, with an average rating of 4.7/10. The website's critical consensus reads, "Salt and Fire crowds together some impressive talent on both sides of the camera, precious little of which is put to compelling use." On Metacritic, which assigns a normalized rating to reviews, the film has a weighted average score of 44 out of 100, based on 16 critics, indicating "mixed or average reviews".

Nick Allen of RogerEbert.com gave the film 1 out of 4 stars, writing, "It resists any narrative integrity, it chooses acting that is lifeless, it rants endlessly whether it wants to amuse logic or not." Deborah Young of The Hollywood Reporter called the film "one of the director's least appealing adventures."

== See also ==
Related Werner Herzog films

- La Soufrière, a 1977 documentary film about the La Grande Soufrière volcano in Guadeloupe.
- Into the Inferno, a 2016 documentary film exploring active volcanoes in Indonesia, Iceland and Ethiopia.
- The Fire Within: A Requiem for Katia and Maurice Krafft, a 2022 documentary about the two French volcanologists who died on Mount Uzen, Japan
