= Into the Inferno =

Into the Inferno may refer to:

- Into the Inferno (film), a 2016 Werner Herzog documentary
- An episode of the four-part series finale of Avatar: The Last Airbender, Sozin's Comet.
