= Kayla Iacovino =

American volcanologist

- Education: University of Cambridge, Arizona State University
- Scientific career
- Fields: Volcanology, Experimental petrology
- Workplaces: SETI Institute
- Doctoral advisor: Clive Oppenheimer
- Website: https://www.kaylaiacovino.com/

Kayla Iacovino is an American volcanologist, noted for her widespread fieldwork and experimental petrology. She was the first woman to do her field work in North Korea. Originally from Arizona in the United States, she has worked in countries including Chile, North Korea, China, Costa Rica, Antarctica, Italy, Japan and Ethiopia.

== Early life ==
Iacovino was born and raised in Arizona. She entered Arizona State University in 2005, with the initial interest of filming and directing or becoming an astronaut but quickly became fascinated by geology. In her sophomore year, she began working for and researching with petrologist Gordon Moore. She then pursued her doctoral degree at the University of Cambridge.

== Career ==
Iacovino's work has involved carefully negotiated diplomatic relations with countries such as North Korea. During one of these trips, she worked alongside a team of their scientists as the only woman involved. She was the first female scientist to ever conduct traveling research in North Korea and was also the only American on this expedition.

Iacovino's work in North Korea is part of an international effort (which includes American, British, North Korean, and Chinese colleagues) to understand Mount Paektu, a volcano located on the border between North Korea and China. The work is led by British scientists Clive Oppenheimer (Iacovino's PhD supervisor) and James Hammond and was recently featured in the Werner Herzog documentary "Into the Inferno". The group's work has been published in peer-reviewed scientific journals. Notably, the publications include both western and North Korean co-authors.

In 2012, Iacovino also studied Erta Ale in Ethiopia. During this, her team was the target of a high-profile attempt to capture and imprison Westerners. Due to a delay in traveling, this was not successful - although several other tourists were harmed.

Currently, Iacovino is working for the SETI Institute., having previously worked for Jacobs Inc. at NASA's Johnson Space Center. Iacovino was a Post-Doctoral Fellow at Arizona State University. Iacovino previously held a National Science Foundation Post-Doctoral Fellowship at the United States Department of the Interior US Geological Survey. She recreates magma chambers with experimental petrology, characterizes rock samples, measures volcanic degassing, and performs thermodynamic modeling. Iacovino serves as an editorial committee member for the Diamond open access journal Volcanica.

== Personal life ==
Iacovino was formerly the Editor-in-Chief of TrekMovie.com (a Star Trek fan site), but she officially left the website's staff in 2023. She was inspired by Kate Mulgrew's character - the first female captain of Star Trek. Mulgrew has since met with Iacovino and noted that unlike Iacovino, she "only played one [scientist] on TV."

Iacovino is involved in encouraging young women to pursue STEM careers, such as with projects like the Curiosity Science Program created through a Gold Award Project by one of BBC's 100 Women of 2016, Erin McKenney. In this program, Iacovino described her own career as one that requires curiosity, interest in the world, and a willingness to get your hands dirty. In a separate interview, her advice to people interested in volcanology was, "Follow your heart, and see what path that leads you down and find something that you're passionate about."
