= David A. Johnston =

American volcanologist (1949–1980)

David Alexander Johnston
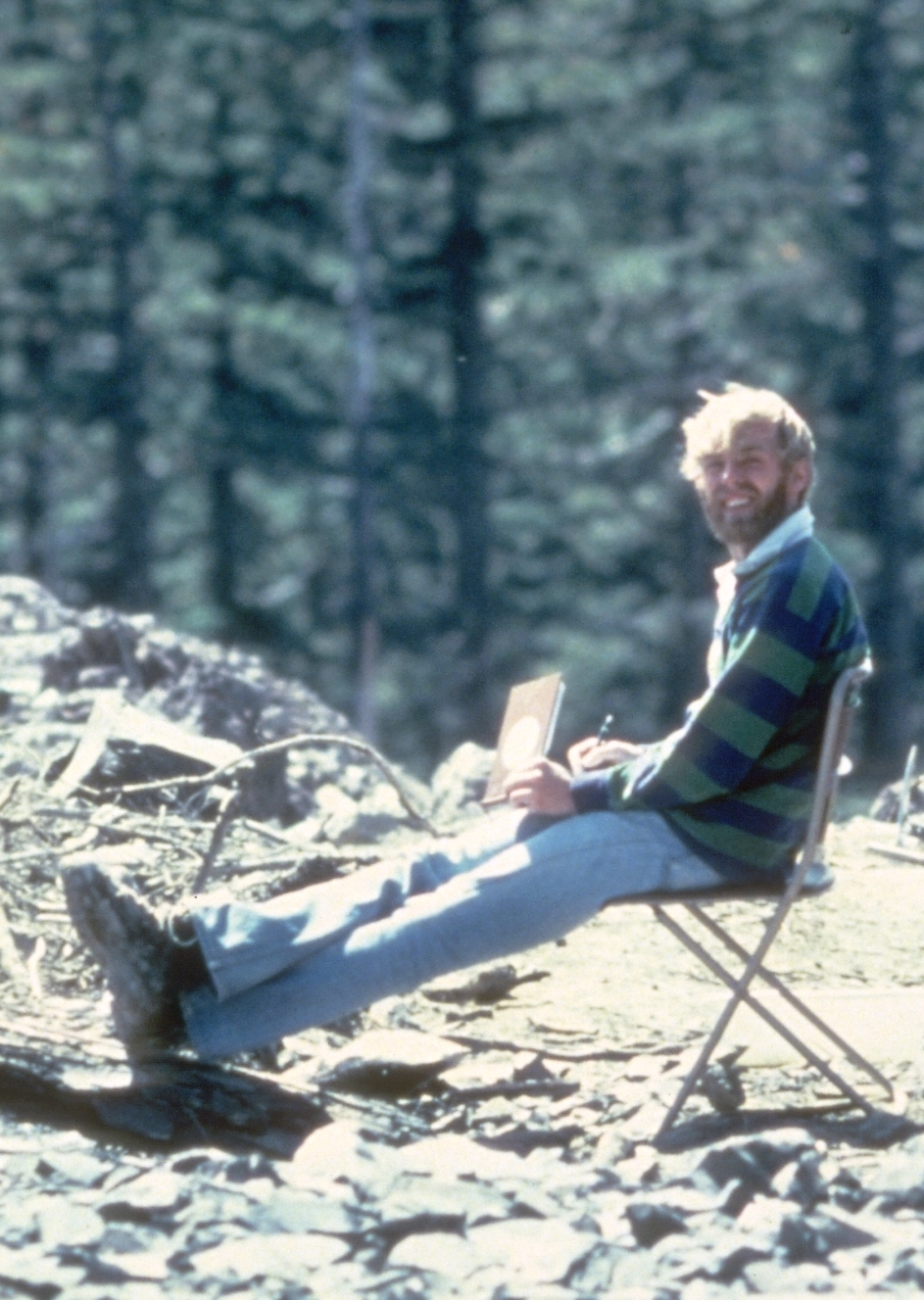
- The last picture taken of Johnston on May 17, 1980, 13 hours before his death at the eruption site
- Born: December 18, 1949; Chicago, Illinois, U.S.
- Died: May 18, 1980 (aged 30); Mount St. Helens, Washington, U.S. 46°16′37″N 122°13′27″W
- Cause of death: Killed by a pyroclastic flow caused by the volcanic eruption of Mount St. Helens
- Education: University of Illinois Urbana-Champaign (BS); University of Washington (MS, PhD)
- Occupation: Volcanologist

David Alexander Johnston (December 18, 1949 – May 18, 1980) was an American United States Geological Survey (USGS) volcanologist who was killed by the 1980 eruption of Mount St. Helens in the U.S. state of Washington. A principal scientist on the USGS monitoring team, Johnston was killed in the eruption while manning an observation post six miles (10 km) away on the morning of May 18, 1980. He was the first to report the eruption, transmitting "Vancouver! Vancouver! This is it!" before he was swept away by a lateral blast; despite a thorough search, Johnston's body was never found, but state highway workers discovered remnants of his USGS trailer in 1993.

Johnston's career took him across the United States, where he studied the Augustine Volcano in Alaska, the San Juan volcanic field in Colorado, and long-extinct volcanoes in Michigan. Johnston was a meticulous and talented scientist, known for his analyses of volcanic gases and their relationship to eruptions. This, along with his enthusiasm and positive attitude, made him liked and respected by many co-workers. After his death, other scientists lauded his character, both verbally and in dedications and letters. Johnston felt scientists must do what is necessary, including taking risks, to help protect the public from natural disasters. His work, and that of fellow USGS scientists, convinced authorities to close Mount St. Helens to the public before the 1980 eruption. They maintained the closure despite heavy pressure to re-open the area. His story became intertwined with the popular image of volcanic eruptions and their threat to society, and a part of volcanology's history. To date, Johnston is one of two American volcanologists known to have died in a volcanic eruption; the other is his student Harry Glicken.

Following his death, Johnston was commemorated in several ways, including a memorial fund established in his name at the University of Washington to fund graduate-level research. Two volcano observatories were established and named after him: one in Vancouver, Washington, and another on the ridge where he died. Johnston's life and death are featured in several documentaries, films, docudramas and books. A biography of his life, A Hero on Mount St. Helens: The Life and Legacy of David A. Johnston, was published in 2019.

== Career and life ==
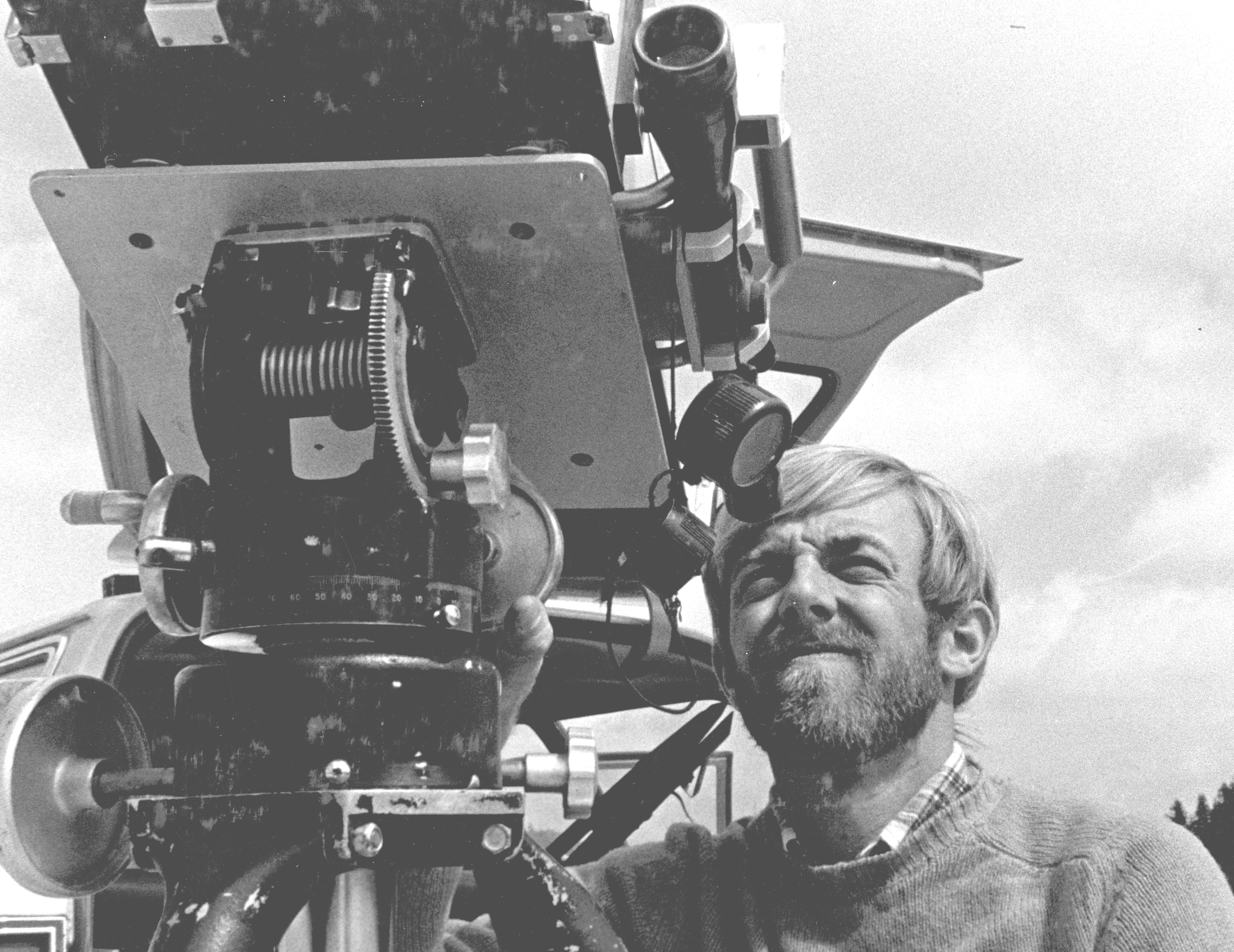
Johnston using a correlation spectrometer, which measures ultraviolet radiation as an indicator of the sulfur dioxide content of gases ejected from Mount St. Helens. Photographed on April 4, 1980.

Johnston was born at the University of Chicago Hospital on December 18, 1949, to Thomas and Alice Johnston. They originally lived in Hometown, Illinois, but moved to Oak Lawn shortly after Johnston's birth, where he grew to adulthood. Johnston grew up with one sister. His father worked as an engineer at a local company and his mother as a newspaper editor. Johnston often took photographs for his mother's newspaper and contributed articles to his school's newspaper. He never married.

After graduating from Harold L. Richards High School in Oak Lawn, Johnston attended the University of Illinois Urbana-Champaign. He planned to study journalism, but became intrigued by an introductory geology class, and changed his major. His first geologic project was a study of the Precambrian rock that forms Michigan's Upper Peninsula. There he investigated the remains of an ancient volcano: a suite of metamorphosed basalts, a gabbroic sill, and volcanic roots in the form of a dioritic and gabbroic intrusion. The experience planted the seed of Johnston's passion for volcanoes. After working hard to learn the subject, he graduated with "Highest Honors and Distinction" in 1971.

Johnston spent the summer after college in the San Juan volcanic field of Colorado working with volcanologist Pete Lipman in his study of two extinct calderas. This work became the inspiration for the first phase of his graduate work at the University of Washington in Seattle, in which he focused on the Oligocene Cimarron andesitic volcanic complex in the western San Juans. Johnston's reconstruction of the eruptive history of the extinct volcanoes prepared him to study active volcanoes. Johnston's first experience with active volcanoes was a geophysical survey of Mount Augustine in Alaska in 1975. When Mount Augustine erupted in 1976, Johnston raced back to Alaska, shunting his former work on the Cimmaron Volcano into a master's thesis, and making Mount Augustine the focus of his Ph.D. work. He graduated in 1978 with his Ph.D., having shown that (1) the emplacement mechanism of the pyroclastic flows had changed over time, as they became less pumaceous, (2) the magmas contained high quantities of volatile water, chlorine, and sulfur, and (3) underground mixing of the felsic (silicic) magmas with less-viscous mafic (basaltic) magmas could have triggered eruptions. Mount Augustine was also the site of an early near-disaster for Johnston, when he became trapped on Augustine Island as the volcano was building toward another eruption.

During the summers of 1978 and 1979, Johnston led studies of the ash-flow sheet emplaced in the 1912 eruption of Mount Katmai in the Valley of Ten Thousand Smokes. The gas phase is extremely important in propelling volcanic eruptions. Because of this, Johnston mastered the many techniques required to analyze glass-vapor inclusions in phenocrysts embedded in lavas, which provide information about gases present during past eruptions. His work at Mount Katmai and other volcanoes in the Valley of Ten Thousand Smokes paved the way for his career, and his "agility, nerve, patience, and determination around the jet-like summit fumaroles in the crater of Mt. Mageik" impressed his colleagues.

Later in 1978, Johnston joined the United States Geological Survey (USGS), where he monitored volcanic emission levels in the Cascades and Aleutian Arc. There he helped to strengthen the theory that eruptions can be predicted, to some degree, by changes in the makeup of volcanic gases. Fellow volcanologist Wes Hildreth said of Johnston, "I think Dave's dearest hope was that systematic monitoring of fumarolic emissions might permit detection of changes characteristically precursory to eruptions ... Dave wanted to formulate a general model for the behavior of magmatic volatiles prior to explosive outbursts and to develop a corollary rationale for the evaluation of hazards." During this time, Johnston continued to visit Mount Augustine every summer and also assessed the geothermal energy potential of the Azores and Portugal. In the last year of his life, Johnston developed an interest in the health, agricultural, and environmental effects of both volcanic and anthropogenic emissions to the atmosphere.

Johnston was based at the branch of the USGS in Menlo Park, California, but his work on volcanoes took him all over the Pacific Northwest region. When the first earthquakes shook Mount St. Helens on March 16, 1980, Johnston was nearby at the University of Washington, where he had pursued his doctorate. Intrigued by the possible event of an eruption, Johnston contacted Stephen Malone, a professor of geology at the university. Malone had been his mentor when Johnston had worked at the San Juan complex in Colorado, and Johnston admired his work. Malone stated that he "put him to work" almost instantly, allowing Johnston to escort interested reporters to a place near the volcano. Johnston was the first geologist on the volcano, and soon became a leader within the USGS team, taking charge of monitoring of volcanic gas emissions.

== Eruption of Mount St. Helens ==
=== Precursor activity ===
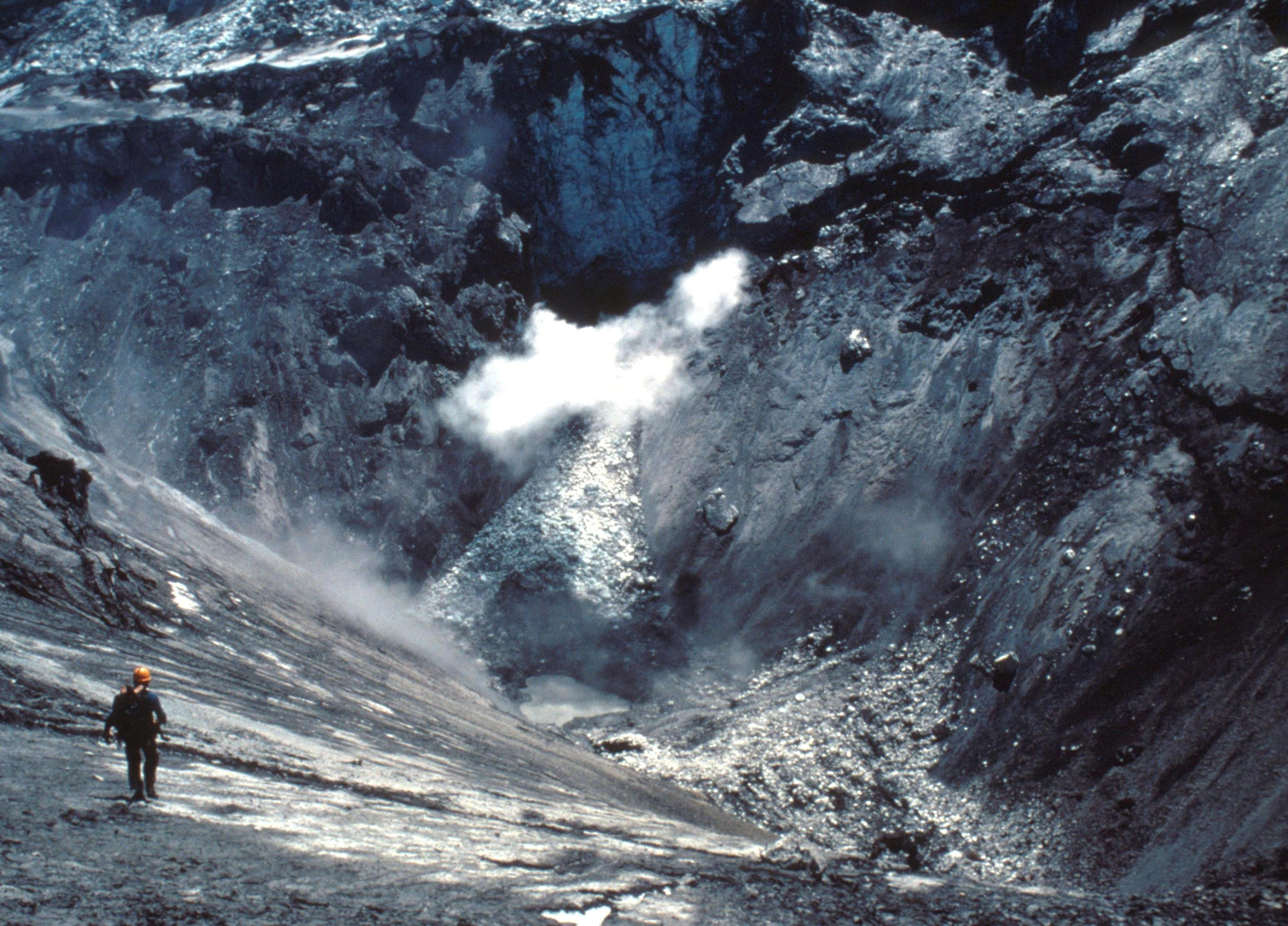
Johnston going into the Mount St. Helens crater to sample the lake. Photographed on April 30, 1980.

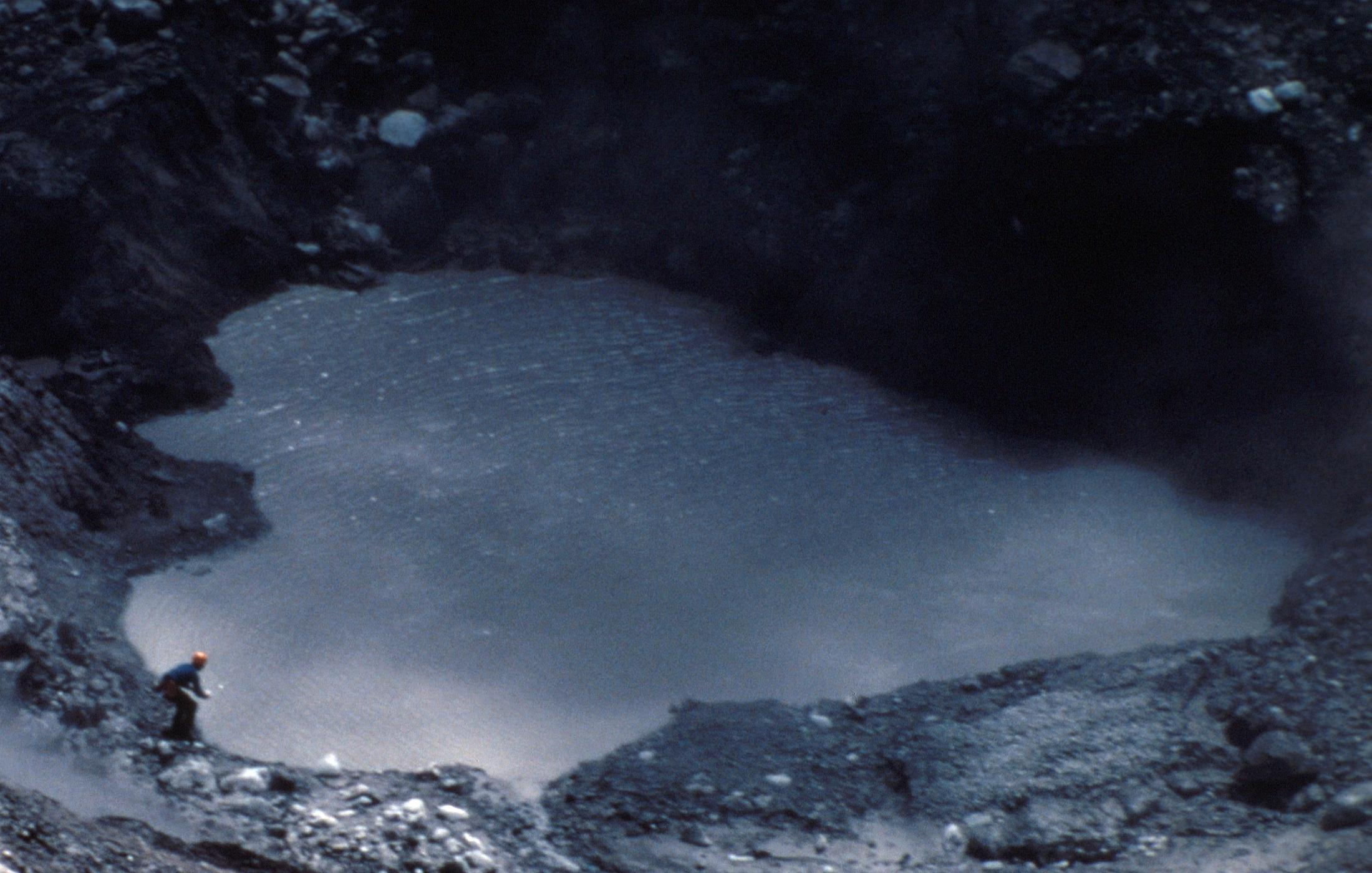
Johnston sampling the lake

Since its last eruptive activity in 1857, Mount St. Helens had been largely dormant. Seismographs were not installed until 1972. This period of 123 years of inactivity ended in early 1980. On March 15, a cluster of tiny earthquakes rocked the area around the mountain. For six days, more than 100 earthquakes clustered around Mount St. Helens, an indication that magma was moving. There was initially some doubt as to whether the earthquakes were precursors to an eruption. By March 20, a magnitude 4.2 earthquake shook the wilderness around the volcano. The next day, seismologists installed three seismic recorder stations. By March 24, volcanologists at the USGS—including Johnston—became more confident that the seismic activity was a sign of an impending eruption. After March 25, seismic activity drastically increased. By March 26, more than seven earthquakes over magnitude 4.0 had been recorded, and the next day, hazard warnings were publicly issued. On March 27, a phreatic eruption took place, ejecting a plume of ash nearly 7,000 feet (2,100 m) into the air.

Similar activity continued at the volcano over the following weeks, excavating the crater and erupting small amounts of steam, ash, and tephra. With each new eruption, the plumes of steam and ash from the volcano rose, eventually climbing to 20,000 feet (6,000 m). By late March, the volcano was erupting up to 100 times per day. Spectators congregated in the vicinity of the mountain, hoping for a chance to see its eruptions. They were joined by reporters in helicopters, as well as mountain climbers.

On April 17, a bulge (or "cryptodome") was discovered on the mountain's north flank, suggesting that Mount St. Helens could produce a lateral blast. Rising magma under Mount St. Helens had veered off to the north flank, creating a growing bulge on the surface.

=== Final signs and primary blast ===
Given the increasing seismic and volcanic activity, Johnston and the other volcanologists working for the USGS in its Vancouver branch prepared to observe any impending eruption. Geologist Don Swanson and others placed reflectors on and around the growing domes, and established the Coldwater I 46°17′55.8″N 122°17′22.9″W and II 46°16′37.5″N 122°13′28.0″W observation posts to use laser ranging to measure how the distances to these reflectors changed over time as the domes deformed. Coldwater II, where Johnston died, was located just 6 miles (10 km) north of the mountain. To the astonishment of the USGS geologists, the bulge was growing at a rate of 5 to 8 feet (1.5 to 2.4 meters) per day.

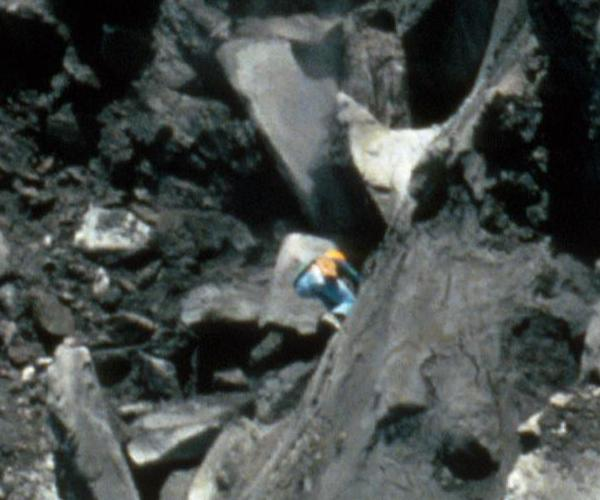
Johnston (center) climbing into the summit crater of Mount St. Helens to sample gases. For the scale, see this picture.

Tiltmeters installed on the volcano's north side displayed a northwest trending tilt for that side of the mountain, and a southwest trending tilt was observed on the south side. Worried that the amount of pressure on the magma underground was increasing, scientists analyzed gases by the crater, and found high traces of sulfur dioxide. After this discovery, they began to regularly check the fumarolic activity and monitor the volcano for dramatic changes, but none were observed. Disheartened, they instead opted to study the growing bulge and the threat an avalanche could have for humans relatively near the volcano. An evaluation of the threat was carried out, concluding that a landslide or avalanche in the Toutle River could spawn lahars, or mudflows, downstream.

At that point, the previously consistent phreatic activity had become intermittent. Between May 10 and 17, the only change occurred on the volcano's north flank, as the bulge increased in size. On May 16 and 17, the mountain stopped its phreatic eruptions completely.

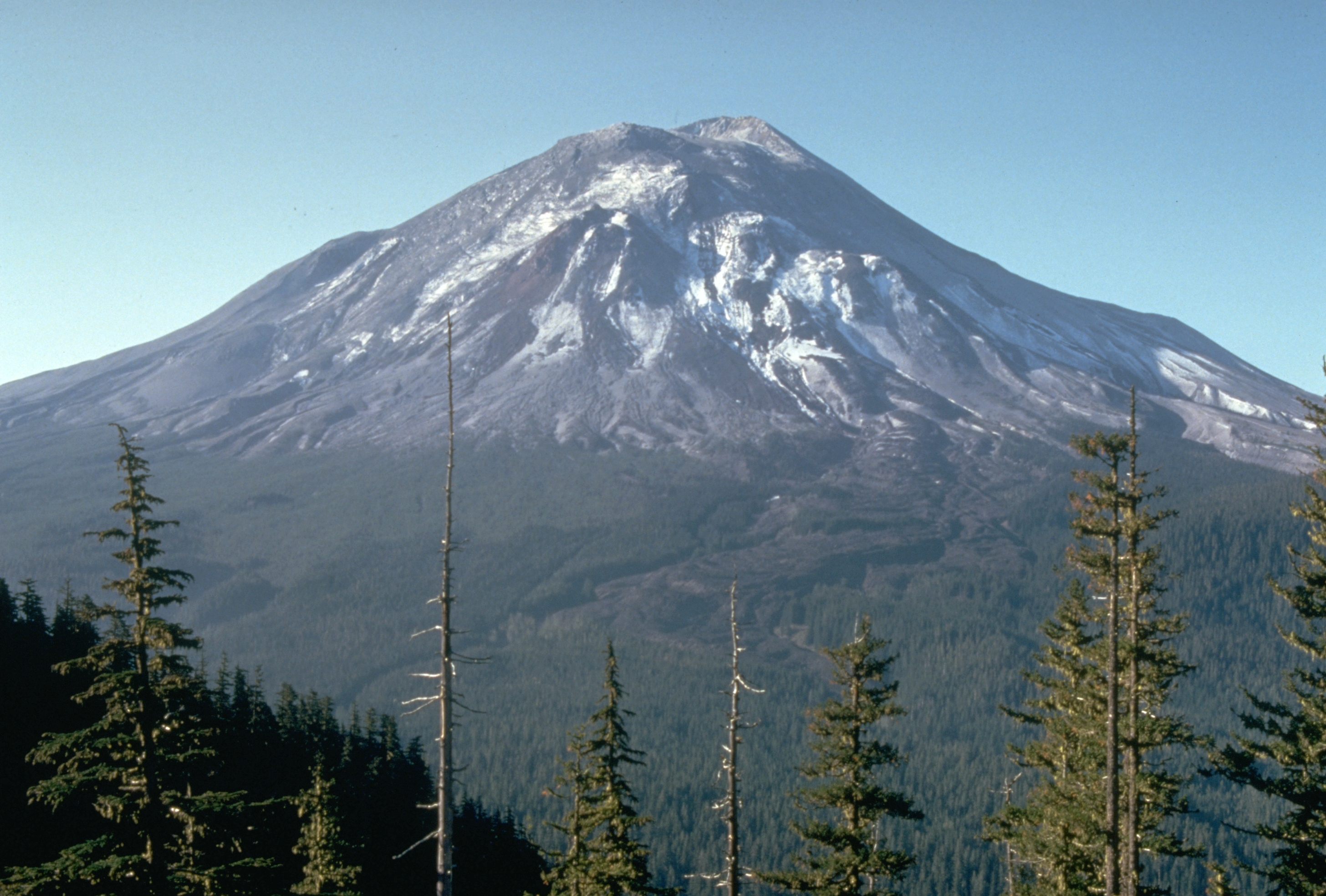
Mount St. Helens as seen on May 17, 1980 one day before the eruption, photographed by Harry Glicken from the ridge where the Coldwater II observation post occupied by Johnston was located

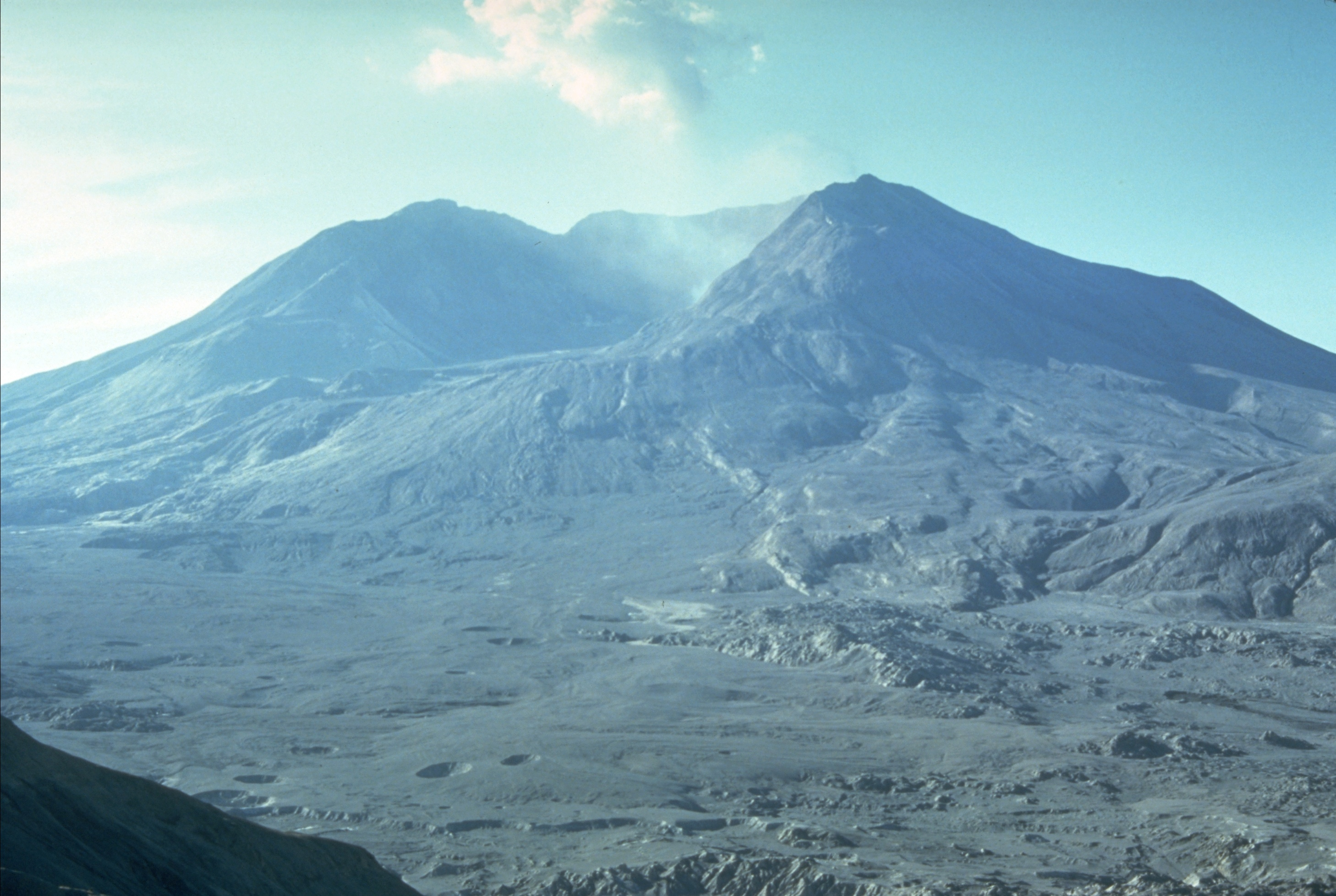
Mount St. Helens in September 1980 four months after the eruption, photographed by Harry Glicken from approximately the same location as the previous photo. In the intervening period, the volcano had erupted, killing Johnston and approximately 60 others, devastating the landscape.

The active Mount St. Helens was radically different from its dormant form, now featuring an enormous bulge and several craters. In the week preceding the eruption, cracks formed in the north sector of the volcano's summit, indicating a movement of magma.

At 8:32 a.m. local time the next day, May 18, 1980, an earthquake measuring magnitude 5.1 rocked the area, triggering the landslide that started the main eruption. In a matter of seconds, vibrations from the earthquake loosened 2.7 cubic kilometers (0.6 cu mi) of rock on the mountain's north face and summit, creating a massive landslide. It was the largest subaerial (on land) landslide in Earth's recorded history. With the loss of the confining pressure of the overlying rock, Mount St. Helens began to rapidly emit steam and other volcanic gases. A few seconds later, it erupted laterally, sending swift pyroclastic flows down its flanks at near supersonic speeds. These flows were later joined by lahars. Before being struck by a series of flows that, at their fastest, would have taken less than a minute to reach his position 46°16′37.5″N 122°13′28.0″W, Johnston attempted to radio his USGS co-workers with the message: "Vancouver! Vancouver! This is it! Vancouver, is the transmitter on?" The cloud of the eruption blocked the transmission of his message to Vancouver; his final words were recorded by an amateur radio operator. Seconds later, the signal from the radio went silent, and all contact with the geologist was lost. Initially, there was some debate as to whether Johnston had survived; records soon showed a radio message from fellow eruption victim and amateur radio operator Gerry Martin, located near the Coldwater peak 46°17′59.7″N 122°12′55″W and farther north of Johnston's position, reporting his sighting of the eruption enveloping the Coldwater II observation post. As the blast overwhelmed Johnston's post, Martin declared solemnly: "Gentlemen, the camper and car that’s sitting over to the south of me is covered. It’s going to hit me, too." before his radio too went silent.

The extent, speed and direction of the avalanche and pyroclastic flows that overwhelmed Johnston, Martin, and others were later described in detail in a paper titled 'Chronology and Character of the May 18, 1980 Explosive Eruptions of Mount St. Helens', published in 1984 in a collection published by the National Research Council's Geophysics Study Committee. In this paper, the authors examined photographs and satellite images of the eruption to construct a chronology and description of the first few minutes. Included in the paper is figure 10.3, a series of timed photographs taken from Mount Adams, 33 miles (53 km) east of Mount St. Helens. These six photographs, taken sideways on to the lateral blast, vividly show the extent and size of the avalanche and flows as they reached northwards over and beyond Johnston's position. Figure 10.7 from the same paper is an overhead diagram showing the position of the pyroclastic surge front at half-minute intervals, with the positions of Johnston (Coldwater II) and Martin included.

The eruption was heard hundreds of miles away, but some of those who survived the eruption declared that the landslide and pyroclastic flows were silent as they raced down the mountain. Kran Kilpatrick, an employee of the United States Forest Service, recalled, "There was no sound to it, not a sound. It was like a silent movie and we were all in it." The reason for this discrepancy is a "quiet zone", created as a result of the motion and temperature of air and, to a lesser extent, upon local topography.

Famous for telling reporters that being on the mountain was like "standing next to a dynamite keg and the fuse is lit", Johnston had been among the first volcanologists at the volcano when eruptive signs appeared, and shortly after was named the head of volcanic gas monitoring. He and several other volcanologists prevented people from being near the volcano during the few months of pre-eruptive activity, and successfully fought pressure to re-open the area. Their work kept the death toll at a few tens of individuals, instead of the thousands who possibly could have been killed had the region not been sealed off.

=== USGS team and rescue efforts ===
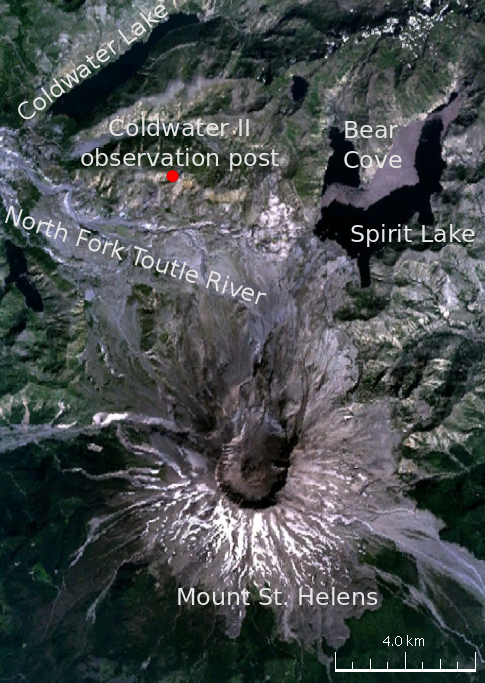
Johnston's Coldwater II observation post was in the path of the blast when the north side of Mount St. Helens collapsed.

Many USGS scientists worked on the team monitoring the volcano, but it was graduate student Harry Glicken who had been manning the Coldwater II observation post for the two and a half weeks immediately preceding the eruption. The evening before the eruption he was scheduled to be relieved by USGS geologist Don Swanson, but something came up, and Swanson asked Johnston to take his place. Johnston agreed. That Saturday, the day before the eruption took place, Johnston ascended the mountain and went on a patrol of the volcano with geologist Carolyn Driedger. Tremors shook the mountain. Driedger was supposed to camp on one of the ridges overlooking the volcano that night, but Johnston told her to head home and said that he would stay on the volcano alone. While at Coldwater II, Johnston was to observe the volcano for any further signs of an eruption. Just prior to his departure, at 7 p.m. on the evening of May 17, 13½ hours before the eruption, Glicken took the famous photograph of Johnston sitting by the observation-post trailer with a notebook on his lap, smiling.

The following morning, May 18, at 8:32 a.m., the volcano erupted. Immediately, rescue workers were dispatched to the area. The official USGS pilot, Lon Stickney, who had been flying the scientists to the mountain, conducted the first rescue attempt. He flew his helicopter over the scarred remains of trees, valleys, and the Coldwater II observation post ridge, where he saw bare rock and uprooted trees. Because he saw no sign of Johnston's trailer, Stickney began to panic, becoming "emotionally distraught".

Frantic and guilt-stricken, Harry Glicken convinced three separate helicopter pilots to take him up on flights over the devastated area in a rescue attempt, but the eruption had so changed the landscape that they were unable to locate any sign of the Coldwater II observation post. In 1993, while building a 9-mile (14 km) extension of Washington State Route 504 (also called "Spirit Lake Memorial Highway") to lead to the Johnston Ridge Observatory, construction workers discovered pieces of Johnston's trailer. His body, however, has never been found.

=== Consequences and response ===
The public was shocked by the extent of the eruption, which had lowered the elevation of the summit by 1,313 feet (400 m), destroyed 230 square miles (600 km^{2}) of woodland, and spread ash into other states and Canada. The lateral blast that killed Johnston started at a speed of 220 miles per hour (350 km/h) and accelerated to 670 miles per hour (1,080 km/h). Even USGS scientists were awed. With a Volcanic Explosivity Index value of 5, the eruption was catastrophic. More than 50 people were killed or missing, including Johnston, mountain resident Harry R. Truman, photographer Robert Landsburg, and National Geographic photographer Reid Blackburn.

The disaster was the deadliest and most destructive volcanic eruption in the history of the United States. A total of 57 people are known to have died, and more were left homeless when the ash falls and pyroclastic flows destroyed or buried 200 houses. In addition to the human fatalities, thousands of animals perished. The official estimate from the USGS was 7,000 game animals, 12 million salmon fingerlings, and 40,000 salmon.

Two years after the eruption, the United States government set aside 110,000 acres (450 km^{2}) of land for the Mount St. Helens National Volcanic Monument. This protected area, which includes the Johnston Ridge Observatory and several other research and visitor centers, serves as an area for scientific research, tourism, and education.

== Legacy ==
=== Scientific ===
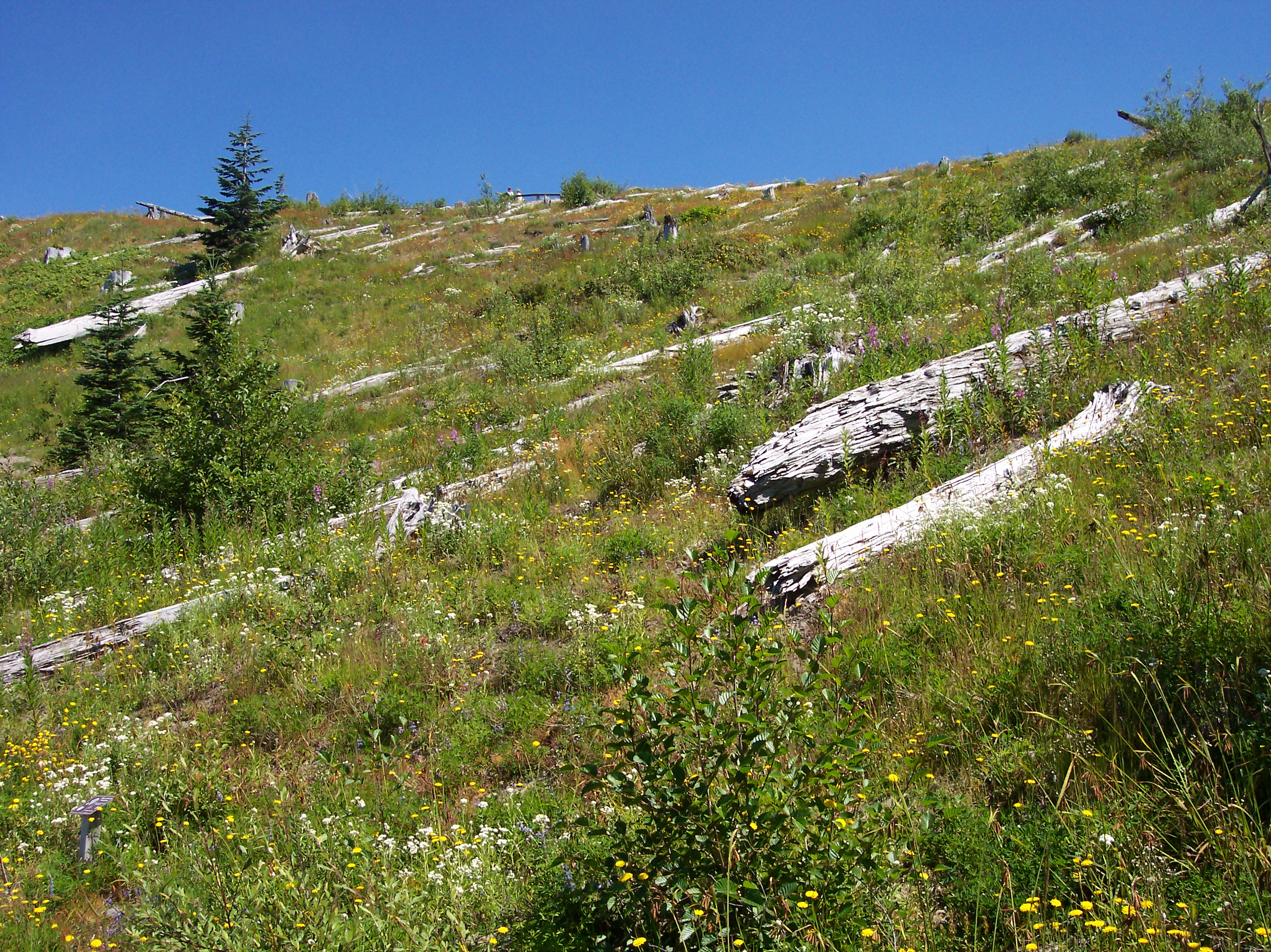
Johnston Ridge from the Johnston Ridge Observatory in July 2005, showing new plant growth among dead trees from the eruption 25 years earlier

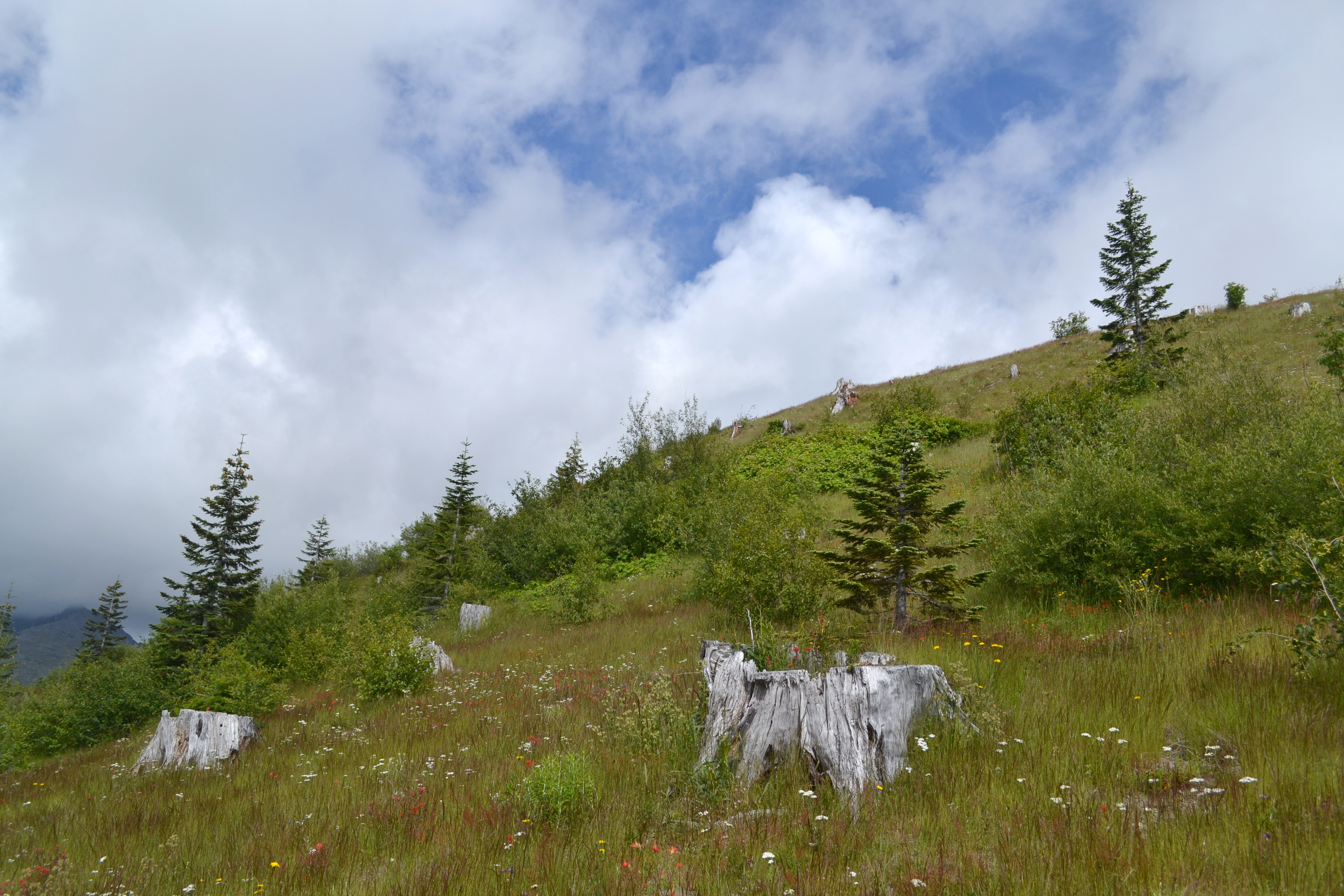
Johnston Ridge from a proximate location in July 2016, showing continued plant growth in the region

Johnston was commemorated both by his fellow scientists and by the government. Known for his diligent and particular nature, he was called "an exemplary scientist" by a USGS dedication paper, which also described him as "unaffectedly genuine, with an infectious curiosity and enthusiasm". He was quick to "dissipate cynicism" and believed that "careful evaluation and interpretation" was the best approach to his work. An obituary notice for Johnston stated that at the time of his death he had been "among the leading young volcanologists in the world" and that his "enthusiasm and warmth" would be "missed at least as much as his scientific strength". Following the eruption, Harry Glicken and other geologists at the USGS dedicated their work to Johnston.

Because Johnston was believed to be safe at the Coldwater II observation post, the fact that he died shocked his friends and co-workers alike. However, most of his colleagues and family asserted that Johnston died "doing what he wanted to do." His mother stated in an interview shortly after the eruption, "Not many people get to do what they really want to do in this world, but our son did. ... He would tell us he may never get rich but he was doing what he wanted. He wanted to be near if the eruption came. In a phone call on Mother's Day, he told us it's a sight very few geologists get to see." Dr. Stephen Malone agreed that Johnston died doing what he loved, and stated that he "was very good at his work".

Johnston's role in the study of the volcano in the weeks leading up to the eruption was acknowledged in 1981 in a chronology of the eruption, published as part of the USGS report titled 'The 1980 Eruptions of Mount St. Helens, Washington':

Among the many contributors of data, none was more essential to the systematic reconstruction of the events of 1980 at Mount St. Helens than David Johnston, to whose memory this report is dedicated. Dave, who was present through all of the activity up to the climactic eruption and who lost his life in that eruption, provided far more than data. His insights and his thoroughly scientific attitude were crucial to the entire effort; they still serve as a model for us all.

— R. L. Christiansen and D. W. Peterson, Chronology of the 1980 Eruptive Activity

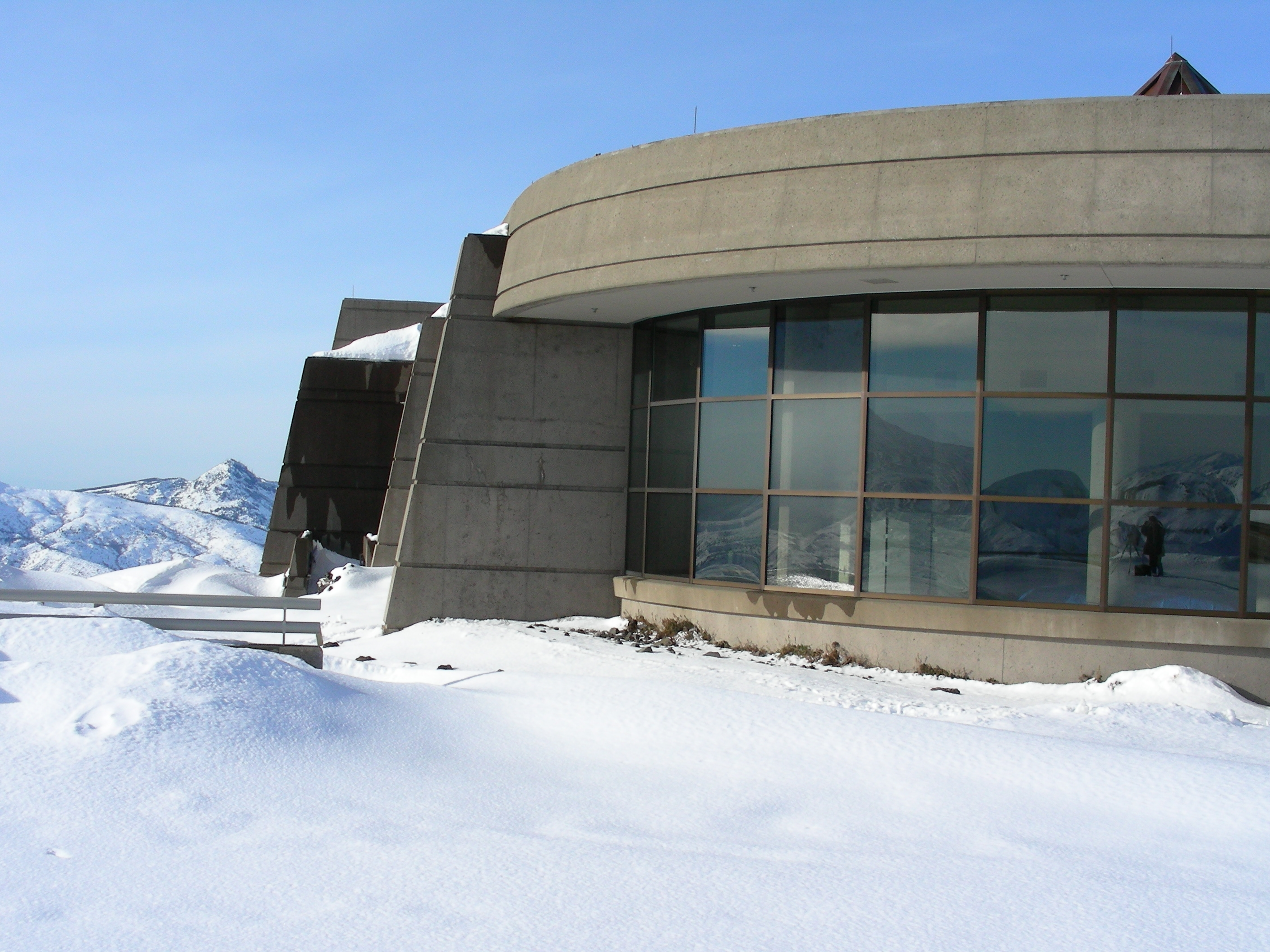
Johnston Ridge Observatory (JRO) in December 2005

Since Johnston's death, his field of volcanic eruption prediction has advanced significantly, and volcanologists are now able to predict eruptions based on a number of precursors that become apparent between days and months in advance. Geologists can now identify characteristic patterns in seismic waves that indicate particular magmatic activity. In particular, volcanologists have used deep, long-period earthquakes that indicate that magma is rising through the crust. They can also use carbon dioxide emission as a proxy for magma supply rate. Measurements of surface deformation due to magmatic intrusions, like those that were conducted by Johnston and the other USGS scientists at the Coldwater I and II outposts, have advanced in scale and precision. Ground deformation monitoring networks around volcanoes now consist of InSAR (interferometry), surveys of networks of GPS monuments, microgravity surveys in which scientists measure the change in gravitational potential or acceleration because of the intruding magma and resulting deformation, strain meters, and tiltmeters. Though there is still work to be done, this combination of approaches has greatly improved scientists' abilities to forecast volcanic eruptions.

In addition to his work, Johnston himself has become part of the history of volcanic eruptions. With Harry Glicken, he is one of two volcanologists from the United States to die in a volcanic eruption. Glicken was being mentored by Johnston, who relieved Glicken of his watch at the Coldwater II observation post 13 hours before Mount St. Helens erupted. Glicken died in 1991, eleven years later, when a pyroclastic flow overran him and several others at Mount Unzen in Japan.

=== Commemoration ===
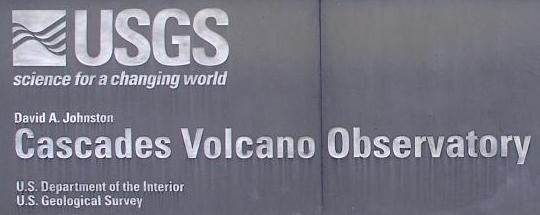
Sign showing the full and official name of the David A. Johnston Cascades Volcano Observatory (CVO)

Early acts of commemoration included two trees that were planted in Tel Aviv, Israel, and the renaming of a community center in Johnston's hometown as the "Johnston Center". These actions were reported in newspapers during the first anniversary of the eruption in May 1981.

On the second anniversary of the eruption, the USGS office in Vancouver (which had been permanently established following the 1980 eruption) was renamed the David A. Johnston Cascades Volcano Observatory (CVO) in his memory. This volcano observatory is the one most responsible for monitoring Mount St. Helens, and helped to predict all of the volcano's eruptions between 1980 and 1985. In a 2005 open day, the lobby area of the CVO included a display and painting commemorating Johnston.

Johnston's connections with the University of Washington (where he had carried out his masters and doctoral research) are remembered by a memorial fund that established an endowed graduate-level fellowship within what is now the department of Earth and Space Sciences. By the time of the first anniversary of his death, the fund had exceeded $30,000. Known as the 'David A. Johnston Memorial Fellowship for Research Excellence', a number of awards of this fellowship have been made over the years since it was launched.

Following the eruption, the area where the Coldwater II observation post had been was sectioned off. Eventually, an observatory was built in the area in Johnston's name, and opened in 1997. Located just over 5 miles (8 km) from the north flank of Mount St. Helens, the Johnston Ridge Observatory (JRO) allows the public to admire the open crater, new activity, and the creations of the 1980 eruption, including an extensive basalt field. Part of the Mount St. Helens National Volcanic Monument, the JRO was constructed for $10.5 million, equipped with monitoring equipment. Visited by thousands of tourists annually, it also includes tours, a theater, and an exhibit hall.

There are several public memorials where Johnston's name is inscribed in a list of those known to have died in the eruption. These memorials include a large curved granite monument at an outside viewing area at the Johnston Ridge Observatory, which opened in 1997, and a plaque at the Hoffstadt Bluffs Visitor Center, which was unveiled in a memorial grove in May 2000.

=== Depictions ===
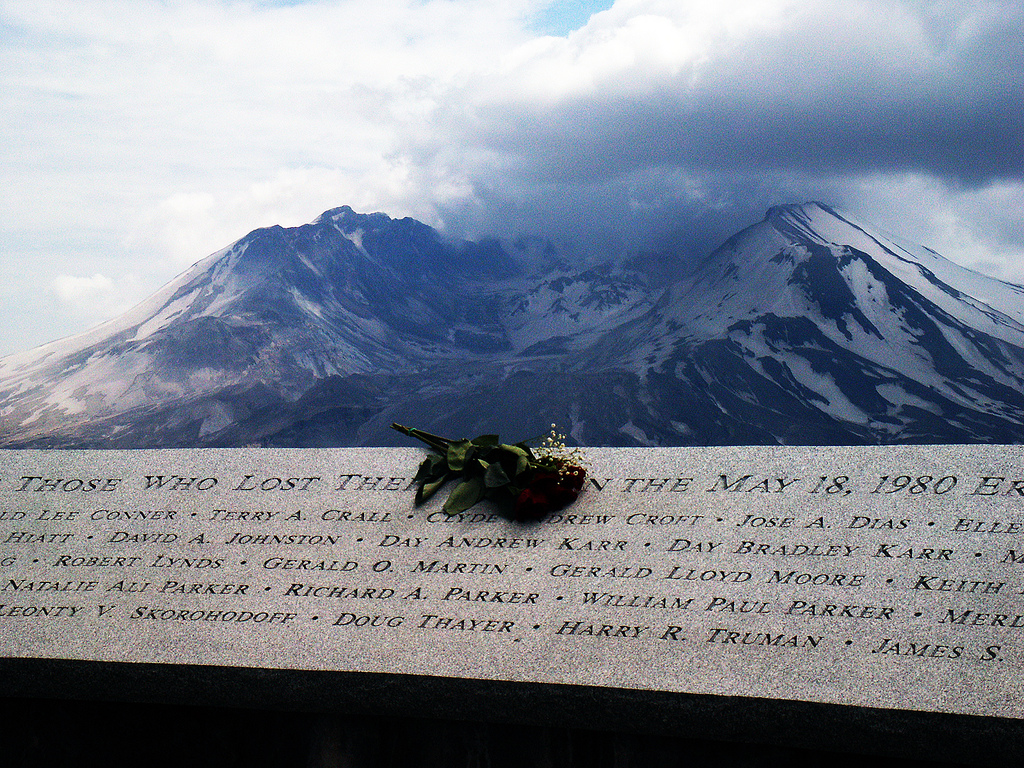
A granite memorial inscribed with the names of the victims of the May 18, 1980, eruption, photographed on the 27th anniversary of the blast. David Johnston's name can be seen beneath the rose, slightly to the left.

There have been several tellings of Johnston's story in documentaries, films and docudramas about the eruption. The most comprehensive depiction is the 2019 book A Hero on Mount St. Helens: The Life and Legacy of David A. Johnston, written by Melanie Holmes (University of Illinois Press); written at the behest of his family.

In the 1981 HBO television film St. Helens, actor David Huffman starred as David Jackson, a fictional character supposedly based on Johnston, but with almost no representation of his actions in 1980. Johnston's parents objected to the production of the film, arguing that it possessed not "an ounce of David in it" and portrayed "him as a daredevil rather than a careful scientist". Johnston's mother stated that the film had changed many true aspects of the eruption, and depicted her son as "a rebel" with "a history of disciplinary trouble". Prior to the film's premiere on May 18, 1981, the first anniversary of the eruption, 36 scientists who knew Johnston signed a letter of protest. They wrote that, "Dave's life was too meritorious to require fictional embellishments," and that, "Dave was a superbly conscientious and creative scientist."

Several documentaries and docudramas have covered the history of the eruption, including archive footage and dramatisations of Johnston's story. These include Up From the Ashes (1990) by KOMO-TV, an episode of the 2005 second series of Seconds From Disaster broadcast by the National Geographic Channel, an episode of the 2006 series Surviving Disaster made by the BBC, and the episode "Rescued From Mount St. Helens" from the 2017 series We'll Meet Again with Ann Curry on PBS.

In 2020, Canadian alternative rock band The Tourist Company (from the other Vancouver) released an album called St. Helens. The opening track was titled "Vancouver, Vancouver This Is It [sic]", and was inspired by Johnston's last words.

== Works ==
- Johnston, David A.; Donnelly-Nolan, Julie, eds. (1981). "Guides to Some Volcanic Terranes in Washington, Idaho, Oregon, and Northern California". Circular. U.S. Geological Survey Circular. Vol. 838. United States Geological Survey. doi:10.3133/cir838.
- Johnston, David A. (1979). "Volcanic gas studies at Alaskan volcanoes". U. S. Geological Survey Circular (Report). C 0804-B. Reston, Virginia, US: United States Geological Survey: B83–B84. ISSN 0364-6017.
- Johnston, David A. (1979). "Revision of the recent eruption history of Augustine Volcano; elimination of the "1902 eruption"". U. S. Geological Survey Circular (Report). C 0804-B. Reston, Virginia, US: United States Geological Survey: B80–B84. ISSN 0364-6017.
- Johnston, David A. (1979). "Onset of volcanism at Augustine Volcano, lower Cook Inlet". U. S. Geological Survey Circular (Report). C 0804-B. Reston, Virginia, US: United States Geological Survey: B78–B80. ISSN 0364-6017.
- Johnston, David A. (1978). Volatiles, magma mixing, and the mechanism of eruption of Augustine Volcano, Alaska. Ph.D. Thesis. Seattle, Washington, US: University of Washington.
- Johnston, David A. (1978). Volcanistic facies and implications for the eruptive history of the Cimarron Volcano, San Juan Mountains, SW Colorado. Master's Thesis. Seattle, Washington, US: University of Washington.
