= Katia and Maurice Krafft =

French volcanologists

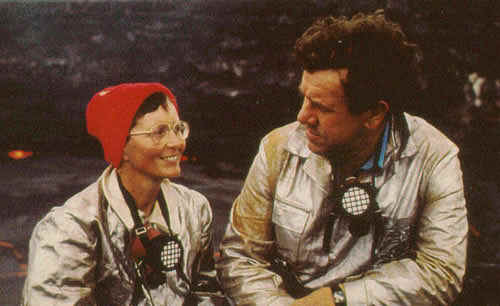
- Born: Catherine Josephine Conrad (Katia); Morice Paul Krafft (Maurice); April 17, 1942 (Katia), March 25, 1946 (Maurice)
- Died: June 3, 1991 (aged 49) (Katia); June 3, 1991 (aged 45) (Maurice); Kitakamikobamachi (Near Mount Unzen), Shimabara, Nagasaki, Japan 32°45′09.5″N 130°20′14.1″E
- Cause of death: Killed by pyroclastic flow during the 1991 eruption of Mt. Unzen

Catherine Joséphine "Katia" Krafft (née Conrad; 17 April 1942 – 3 June 1991) and her husband, Maurice Paul Krafft (25 March 1946 – 3 June 1991) were French volcanologists and filmmakers who died in a pyroclastic flow on Mount Unzen, Nagasaki, Japan, on 3 June 1991. The Kraffts became well known as pioneers in the filming, photographing, and recording of volcanoes, often coming within feet of lava flows. Their obituary appeared in the Bulletin of Volcanology. Since their deaths, their work has been featured in two documentary films by Werner Herzog, Into the Inferno (2016) and The Fire Within: A Requiem for Katia and Maurice Krafft (2022), and a further film, Fire of Love (2022), depicted their lives, relationship and careers using their archived footage.

== Early life and education ==
=== Katia ===
Katia Conrad was born on 17 April 1942 in Guebwiller, France, to Charles and Madeleine Conrad. She graduated from the University of Strasbourg with degrees in physics and chemistry.

=== Maurice ===
Maurice Krafft was born on 25 March 1946 in Mulhouse, France. He first became interested in volcanoes during a family holiday to Naples and Stromboli when he was seven years old. He joined the Société géologique de France when he was 15, and went on to study geology, first at the University of Besançon, and later at the University of Strasbourg.

=== Together ===
The two met while students at the University of Strasbourg, and married in 1970. The couple honeymooned at Stromboli, where they photographed its near-continuous eruption. Recognising the public interest in the documentation of volcanic eruptions, they began to make a career of filming them.

== Career ==
The Kraffts were often the first to arrive at the scene of an active volcano, and became well known in the volcanologist community. Their footage of the effects of volcanic eruptions on the surrounding areas often played a considerable part in gaining the cooperation of local authorities faced with volcanic threats. Following the onset of activity at Mount Pinatubo in the Philippines in 1991, the Kraffts' footage of the impact of the 1985 Nevado del Ruiz lahar in Colombia, which had caused the Armero tragedy, was shown to large numbers of people, including the then president of the Philippines, Corazon Aquino, and was attributed to convincing a number of skeptics that an evacuation of the area was necessary.

Katia started her career by taking gas samples of volcanoes and documenting eruptions by observing them in person, writing books on her findings to fund her trips; her books pioneered a new area of volcanic coverage. The Kraffts' close-up footage of volcanic eruptions has been attributed to enhancing geologists' understanding and knowledge of the topic, while Katia has been cited as a pioneer in the field of female volcanologists. In addition to their observations, the Kraffts also took measures, gas readings, and samples, often feet away from pyroclastic and lava flows, and documented how the eruptions affected the local ecosystem. The Kraffts documented the formation of new volcanoes, in addition to the effects of acid rain and ash clouds.

Throughout the 1970s and 1980s, the Kraffts documented various volcanoes and volcanic eruptions; Maurice would often film them while Katia took photographs. In 1987, the Kraffts featured in "The Volcano Watchers", an episode in the sixth season of the PBS series Nature.

One of the Kraffts' final projects was "Understanding Volcanic Hazards and Reducing Volcanic Risks", in which they produced informational films and educational materials on the science of volcanic eruptions and the need of evacuations.

== Mount Unzen eruption and deaths ==
On 3 June 1991 at 4pm local time, Mount Unzen erupted, forming pyroclastic flows that rushed down its slopes, killing 43 people including the Kraffts, as well as their fellow volcanologist Harry Glicken, who had accompanied them to observe the eruption. On 5 June 1991, the bodies of the Kraffts and Glicken were recovered. Katia and Maurice were found near their rental car, lying side by side under a layer of pyroclastic ash; Glicken's body was located nearby. The bodies were burned beyond recognition and were identified using personal items, including Maurice's watch and camera. The bodies' position suggested that Glicken had attempted to flee from the flow, while the Kraffts had remained where they were. Material they filmed of the approaching flow was destroyed by the volcanic heat.

The remains of the Kraffts were cremated during a Catholic funeral service, and were placed at the Anyo-ji Shrine in Shimabara, which was dedicated to the victims of the 1792 Unzen earthquake and tsunami. Their ashes were subsequently interred at Katia's family plot in France.

After his death, Maurice was quoted in the Associated Press as stating that he wanted to die pursuing his work "at the edge of a volcano."

== Legacy ==
A volcanic crater, M. and K. Krafft Crater, on the Piton de la Fournaise volcano in Réunion, France, is named after the couple. The crater is located at 21°13′23″S 55°43′2″E. Lava erupted from this crater in March 1998.

The Krafft Medal honours the Kraffts' memory and is awarded every four years by the International Association of Volcanology and Chemistry of the Earth's Interior to someone who has made significant contributions to volcanology through service to communities affected by volcanic activity.

The Centre for the Study of Active Volcanoes at the University of Hawai'i at Hilo established a fund remembering the Kraffts, the Maurice and Katia Krafft Memorial Fund. Donations are directed to educate people in countries of high volcanic risk about the hazards active volcanoes pose.

Filmmaker Werner Herzog made the documentary The Fire Within: A Requiem for Katia and Maurice Krafft in 2022.

== Books ==
Maurice Krafft

- Guide des volcans d’Europe : généralités, France, Islande, Italie, Grèce, Allemagne..., Neuchâtel: Delachaux et Niestlé, 1974, 412 pages.
- Questions à un volcanologue : Maurice Krafft répond, Paris: Hachette-Jeunesse, 1981, 231 pages.
- Les Volcans et leurs secrets, Paris: Nathan, 1984, 63 pages.
- Le Monde merveilleux des volcans, Paris: Hachette-Jeunesse, 1981, 58 pages.
- Les Feux de la Terre : Histoire de volcans, collection « Découvertes Gallimard » (nº 113), série Sciences et techniques. Paris: Gallimard, 1991 (new edition in 2003), 208 pages.
  - Volcanoes: Fire from the Earth, "Abrams Discoveries" series, New York: Harry N. Abrams, 1993.
  - Volcanoes: Fire from the Earth, 'New Horizons' series, London: Thames & Hudson, 1993.

Maurice and Katia Krafft

- À l’assaut des volcans, Islande, Indonésie, Paris: Presses de la Cité, 1975, 112 pages.
- Preface by Eugène Ionesco, Les Volcans, Paris: Draeger-Vilo, 1975, 174 pages.
- La Fournaise, volcan actif de l’île de la Réunion, Saint-Denis: Éditions Roland Benard, 1977, 121 pages.
- Volcans, le réveil de la Terre, Paris: Hachette-Réalités, 1979, 158 pages.
- Dans l’antre du Diable : volcans d’Afrique, Canaries et Réunion, Paris: Presses de la Cité, 1981, 124 pages.
- Volcans et tremblements de terre, Paris: Les Deux Coqs d’Or, 1982, 78 pages.
- Volcans et dérives des continents, Paris: Hachette, 1984, 157 pages.
- Les plus beaux volcans, d’Alaska en Antarctique et Hawaï, Paris: Solar, 1985, 88 pages.
- Volcans et éruptions, Paris: Hachette-Jeunesse, 1985, 90 pp.
- Les Volcans du monde, Vevey-Lausanne: Éditions Mondo, 1986, 152 pages.
- Objectif volcans, Paris: Nathan Image, 1986, 154 pp.
- Führer zu den Virunga Vulkanen, Stuttgart: F. Enke, 1990, 187 pages.

Maurice Krafft and Roland Benard

- Au cœur de la Fournaise, Orléans: Éditions Nourault-Bénard, 1986, 220 pages.

Maurice Krafft, Katia Krafft and François-Dominique de Larouzière

- Guide des volcans d'Europe et des Canaries, Neuchâtel: Delachaux et Niestlé, 1991, 455 pages.
