= La Soufrière (film) =

- Directed by: Werner Herzog
- Starring: Werner Herzog
- Narrated by: Werner Herzog
- Cinematography: Edward Lachman; Jörg Schmidt-Reitwein
- Edited by: Beate Mainka-Jellinghaus
- Production companies: Werner Herzog Filmproduktion; Süddeutscher Rundfunk
- Release date: 1977
- Running time: 30 minutes
- Countries: West Germany; Guadeloupe
- Languages: German; French; English

La Soufrière – Warten auf eine unausweichliche Katastrophe ("La Soufrière – Waiting for an Inevitable Disaster") is a 1977 documentary film in which German director Werner Herzog visits an evacuated town on the island of Guadeloupe, where the volcano La Grande Soufrière is predicted to erupt.

== Background ==
The pretext of this film was provided when Herzog "heard about the impending volcanic eruption, that the island of Guadeloupe had been evacuated and that one peasant had refused to leave, [he] knew [he] wanted to go talk to him and find out what kind of relationship towards death he had" (Cronin). Herzog explores the deserted streets of the towns on the island. The crew of three treks up to the caldera, where clouds of sulfurous steam and smoke drift like "harbingers of death" (Peucker), an example of the sublime Herzog seeks to conjure in his films. Herzog converses in French with three different men he finds remaining on the island: one says he is waiting for death, and even demonstrates his posture for doing so; another says he has stayed to look after the animals. In the end, the volcano did not erupt, thus sparing the lives of those who had remained on the island, including Herzog and his crew.

== See also ==
=== Related Werner Herzog films ===
- Into the Inferno, a 2016 documentary film exploring active volcanoes from around the world
- Salt and Fire, a 2016 thriller film about the imminent eruption of a supervolcano in Bolivia
- The Fire Within: A Requiem for Katia and Maurice Krafft, a 2022 documentary about the two French volcanologists who died on Mount Uzen, Japan
