= Fireball: Visitors from Darker Worlds =

2020 documentary film directed by Werner Herzog and Clive Oppenheimer

- Film poster
- Directed by: Werner Herzog; Clive Oppenheimer
- Written by: Werner Herzog
- Produced by: Richard Melman; Greg Boustead; Jessica Harrop; Anna Godas; Oli Harbottle; André Singer; Lucki Stipetić; Vijay Vaidyanathan
- Narrated by: Werner Herzog
- Cinematography: Peter Zeitlinger
- Edited by: Marco Capalbo
- Music by: Ernst Reijseger
- Production companies: Sandbox Films; Dogwoof; Hot Doc Partners; Spring Films; Werner Herzog Films
- Distributed by: Apple TV+
- Release dates: September 10, 2020 (TIFF); November 13, 2020 (Apple TV+)
- Running time: 97 minutes
- Country: United States
- Language: English

Fireball: Visitors from Darker Worlds is a 2020 documentary film directed by Werner Herzog and Clive Oppenheimer. The film explores the cultural, spiritual, and scientific impact of meteorites, and the craters they create around the globe.

It had its world premiere at the Toronto International Film Festival on September 10, 2020. It was released on Apple TV+ on November 13, 2020.

== Production ==
The inspiration for the film came from Clive Oppenheimer's visit to a South Korean lab that studies and displays meteorites. Enamored with the exotic nature of the stones and "the cultural significance of meteorites and impact craters to human societies around the world", he spoke with Werner Herzog about creating this documentary.

The production filmed across 12 different locations, in 6 different continents.

== Release ==
In July 2020, Apple acquired the distribution rights to the film. The film premiered at the 2020 Toronto International Film Festival on September 10, 2020. It was released on Apple TV+ on November 13, 2020.

== Critical reception ==
On review aggregator Rotten Tomatoes, the film holds an approval rating of 98% based on 43 reviews, with an average rating of 7.2/10. The website's critical consensus reads, "Much like the cosmic debris it investigates, Fireball: Visitors from Darker Worlds is made up of heavy stuff -- but it lights up the screen thanks to Werner Herzog's infectious awe." On Metacritic, the film has a weighted average score of 72 out of 100, based on 17 critics.

The film received a nomination for the 2020 Critics' Choice Documentary Awards for Best Narration.
