= Fire of Love (2022 film) =

2022 documentary film by Sara Dosa

- Theatrical release poster
- Directed by: Sara Dosa
- Written by: Sara Dosa; Shane Boris; Erin Casper; Jocelyne Chaput
- Produced by: Shane Boris; Sara Dosa; Ina Fichman
- Narrated by: Miranda July
- Edited by: Erin Casper; Jocelyne Chaput
- Music by: Nicolas Godin
- Production companies: Sandbox Films; Intuitive Pictures; Cottage M
- Distributed by: National Geographic Documentary Films; Neon
- Release dates: January 20, 2022 (Sundance); July 6, 2022 (United States)
- Running time: 93 minutes
- Countries: United States; Canada
- Languages: English; French
- Box office: $1.8 million

Fire of Love is a 2022 independent documentary film about the lives and careers of volcanologists Katia and Maurice Krafft. Directed, written, and produced by Sara Dosa, the film had its world premiere at the 2022 Sundance Film Festival on January 20, 2022, where it won the Jonathan Oppenheim Editing Award. It was released on July 6, 2022, by National Geographic Documentary Films and Neon. It received acclaim from critics, and was nominated for Best Documentary Feature at the 95th Academy Awards.

== Synopsis ==
The film tells the story of French volcanologists Katia and Maurice Krafft, a daring couple bound by their love for each other and their shared obsession with volcanoes. Through rare archival footage and a poetic French New Wave-inspired narrative, the film chronicles their two-decade journey of capturing the Earth’s most explosive phenomena, standing perilously close to fiery eruptions in their quest for scientific discovery and breathtaking imagery. As their passion pushes the boundaries of safety, the documentary explores the philosophical and emotional depths of their commitment to understanding the planet’s volatile beauty, culminating in their tragic final expedition to Mount Unzen in 1991, where their lives are claimed by the force they so deeply revered.

== Production ==
In March 2021, it was announced Sara Dosa would direct a documentary film revolving around Katia and Maurice Krafft. In January 2022, it was announced Miranda July would serve as the narrator.

== Release ==
The film had its world premiere at the 2022 Sundance Film Festival on January 20, 2022 where it won the Jonathan Oppenheim Editing Award in the U.S. Documentary category. Shortly after, National Geographic Documentary Films acquired distribution rights to the film, winning a bidding war against Netflix, Amazon Studios, Sony Pictures Classics, IFC Films, Universal Pictures and Paramount Pictures. It also screened at South by Southwest on March 11, 2022. In April 2022, it was announced Neon would co-distribute the film. The film was released on SVOD to Disney+ on November 11, 2022.

== Reception ==
=== Box office ===
In the United States and Canada, the film earned $22,416 from three theaters in its opening weekend.

=== Critical response ===
On Rotten Tomatoes, it has an approval rating of 98% based on 173 reviews, with an average rating of 8.2/10. The website's critics consensus reads, "Whether as a story of one couple's quixotic quest or simply a stunning collection of nature footage, Fire of Love burns bright." On Metacritic, the film holds a weighted average score of 82 out of 100, based on 38 critics, indicating "universal acclaim".

=== Accolades ===
Award	Date of ceremony	Category	Recipient(s)	Result	Ref.
Sundance Film Festival	January 30, 2022	Jonathan Oppenheim Editing Award: U.S. Documentary	Erin Casper and Jocelyne Chaput	Won	
Sydney Film Festival	19 June 2022	Sydney Film Prize	Fire of Love	Nominated	
Miskolc International Film Festival	September 17, 2022	CineDocs Prize	Fire of Love	Nominated	
Zurich Film Festival	October 2, 2022	Science Film Award	Fire of Love	Nominated	
Critics' Choice Documentary Awards	November 13, 2022	Best Documentary Feature	Fire of Love	Nominated	
Critics' Choice Documentary Awards	November 13, 2022	Best Archival Documentary	Fire of Love	Won	
Critics' Choice Documentary Awards	November 13, 2022	Best Science/Nature Documentary	Fire of Love	Nominated	
Critics' Choice Documentary Awards	November 13, 2022	Best Director	Sara Dosa	Nominated	
Critics' Choice Documentary Awards	November 13, 2022	Best Narration	Shane Boris, Erin Casper, Jocelyne Chaput, Sara Dosa, Miranda July	Nominated	
Critics' Choice Documentary Awards	November 13, 2022	Best Score	Nicolas Godin	Nominated	
Critics' Choice Documentary Awards	November 13, 2022	Best Editing	Erin Casper and Jocelyne Chaput	Nominated	
Los Angeles Film Critics Association	December 11, 2022	Best Documentary/Non-Fiction Film	Fire of Love	Runner-up	
Washington D.C. Area Film Critics Association	December 12, 2022	Best Documentary	Fire of Love	Nominated	
Chicago Film Critics Association	December 14, 2022	Best Documentary Film	Fire of Love	Won	
St. Louis Gateway Film Critics Association	December 18, 2022	Best Documentary Film	Fire of Love	Nominated	
Dallas–Fort Worth Film Critics Association	December 19, 2022	Best Documentary Film	Fire of Love	3rd place	
Florida Film Critics Circle	December 22, 2022	Best Documentary Film	Fire of Love	Nominated	
Alliance of Women Film Journalists	January 5, 2023	Best Documentary	Fire of Love	Nominated	
San Diego Film Critics Society	January 6, 2023	Best Documentary	Fire of Love	Runner-up	
Toronto Film Critics Association	January 8, 2023	Best Documentary Film	Fire of Love	Runner-up	
San Francisco Bay Area Film Critics Circle	January 9, 2023	Best Documentary Feature	Fire of Love	Nominated	
Austin Film Critics Association	January 10, 2023	Best Documentary	Fire of Love	Nominated	
Cinema Eye Honors	January 12, 2023	Outstanding Non-Fiction Feature	Sara Dosa, Shane Boris and Ina Fichman	Nominated	
Cinema Eye Honors	January 12, 2023	Outstanding Direction	Sara Dosa	Nominated	
Cinema Eye Honors	January 12, 2023	Outstanding Editing	Erin Casper and Jocelyne Chaput	Won	
Cinema Eye Honors	January 12, 2023	Outstanding Original Score	Nicolas Godin	Won	
Cinema Eye Honors	January 12, 2023	Outstanding Sound Design	Patrice LeBlanc and Gavin Fernandes	Nominated	
Cinema Eye Honors	January 12, 2023	Outstanding Visual Design	Lucy Munger, Kara Blake and Rui Ting Ji	Won	
Cinema Eye Honors	January 12, 2023	Audience Choice Prize	Fire of Love	Nominated	
Cinema Eye Honors	January 12, 2023	The Unforgettables	Katia and Maurice Krafft	Won	
Georgia Film Critics Association	January 13, 2023	Best Documentary Film	Fire of Love	Won	
Seattle Film Critics Society	January 17, 2023	Best Documentary Feature	Fire of Love	Won	
Online Film Critics Society	January 23, 2023	Best Documentary	Fire of Love	Won	
London Film Critics' Circle	February 5, 2023	Documentary of the Year	Fire of Love	Nominated	
Satellite Awards	February 11, 2023	Best Motion Picture – Documentary	Fire of Love	Won	
Vancouver Film Critics Circle	February 13, 2023	Best Documentary	Fire of Love	Nominated	
Houston Film Critics Society	February 18, 2023	Best Documentary Feature	Fire of Love	Nominated	
Directors Guild of America Awards	February 18, 2023	Outstanding Directorial Achievement in Documentaries	Sara Dosa	Won	
British Academy Film Awards	February 19, 2023	Best Documentary	Sara Dosa, Shane Boris, Ina Fichman	Nominated	
Hollywood Critics Association Awards	February 24, 2023	Best Documentary Film	Fire of Love	Nominated	
Producers Guild of America Awards	February 25, 2023	Outstanding Producer of Documentary Theatrical Motion Pictures	Sara Dosa, Shane Boris, and Ina Fichman	Nominated	
Academy Awards	March 12, 2023	Best Documentary Feature	Sara Dosa, Shane Boris and Ina Fichman	Nominated	
Peabody Awards	2023	Arts	Fire of Love	Won	

== Feature film adaptation ==
In March 2023, Searchlight Pictures announced a feature film adaptation with Hunting Lane Films, Submarine Deluxe and Sandbox Films set to produce.

== See also ==
- The Fire Within: A Requiem for Katia and Maurice Krafft, 2022 film directed by Werner Herzog
