= Peter Francis (volcanologist) =

British volcanologist

- Peter Francis in the field
- Born: Peter William Francis; 1944; Mufulira
- Died: 1999 (aged 54–55)
- Education: Imperial College London (PhD)
- Scientific career
- Workplaces: Open University; Lunar and Planetary Institute; University of Hawaii
- Thesis: Some aspects of the Lewisian geology of Barra and adjacent islands (1969)
- Doctoral students: Clive Oppenheimer

Peter William Francis (1944–1999) was a British volcanologist specialising in the study of active volcanoes on both the Earth and other planets in the Solar System. He was also renowned for his ability as a communicator, reaching the general public in a series of popular and acclaimed books on his subject.

== Education and early life ==
He was born in 1944 in Mufulira, Zambia, and studied geology at Imperial College London. His doctoral thesis investigated the structural geology of Barra, Lewis and Harris in the Hebrides, Scotland.

== Career and research ==
His PhD was followed by fieldwork in the central Andes of northern Chile, a region with which his name would become synonymous in later years. He became a volcanologist recruited to the Open University in 1971, he continued his fieldwork in the Andes, and complemented this with image analysis using Landsat images which were becoming available in the early-1970s.

This work enabled him and co-workers to recognise many large volcanic features in the central Andes, including debris avalanche deposits from multiple volcanic edifices. One prominent example is the almost perfectly preserved deposit at Socompa Volcano, Chile.

The imagery also revealed several larger structures on the Andean altiplano, which proved to be a series of large calderas. These included the large La Pacana and Cerro Galán calderas. Fieldwork in 1982 at Cerro Galán, in the remote northwest of Argentina, which involved the support of both UK and Argentine armed forces, was the last co-operation between the two countries before the Falkland Islands / Las Malvinas conflict later that year.

He was visiting scholar at the Lunar and Planetary Institute, Houston, Texas, and subsequently as a Visiting Professor in the Planetary Geosciences Division of the University of Hawaii, Manoa, Hawaii, he were followed in 1991 by a return to the Open University, where he was Director of Teaching from 1996 and Professor of Volcanology from 1998.

His drive to promote the science of volcanology led to the publication in 1976 of his highly successful Penguin book Volcanoes, which was followed in 1993 by Volcanoes: a Planetary perspective. These books brought volcanology to a far wider audience than previous works aimed at the scientific community.

== Personal life ==
Francis married British civil servant Mary George in June 1991. He died after suffering a sudden heart attack on 30 October 1999, while in Paris, France with his wife Mary.
