= Into the Inferno (film) =

2016 documentary film by Werner Herzog

- Film poster
- Directed by: Werner Herzog
- Written by: Werner Herzog
- Based on: Eruptions that Shook the World by Clive Oppenheimer
- Produced by: André Singer; Lucki Stipetić
- Starring: Clive Oppenheimer
- Narrated by: Werner Herzog
- Cinematography: Peter Zeitlinger
- Edited by: Joe Bini
- Production companies: Spring Films; Werner Herzog Film
- Distributed by: Netflix
- Release dates: 3 September 2016 (Telluride Film Festival); 28 October 2016 (Worldwide)
- Running time: 104 minutes
- Countries: United Kingdom; Germany
- Language: English

Into the Inferno is a 2016 documentary film directed by Werner Herzog. In it, Herzog and volcanologist Clive Oppenheimer explore active volcanoes around the world, especially how they have affected the cultures of the people who live near them. The film had its world premiere at the 43rd Telluride Film Festival on 3 September 2016 before it began streaming on Netflix on 28 October.

== Synopsis ==
In his exploration of active volcanoes in Vanuatu, Indonesia (Mount Sinabung and Mount Merapi), Ethiopia (Erta Ale), Iceland, and North Korea (Paektu Mountain), Herzog is led by volcanologist Clive Oppenheimer, who hopes to minimize destructive impact of volcanoes through his work. The primary goal of Herzog's quest is to get a better idea of our origins and nature as a species. He finds volcanoes mysterious, violent, and rapturously beautiful, and claims that "there is no single one that is not connected to a belief system."

== Release ==
The film had its world premiere at the 43rd Telluride Film Festival on 3 September 2016. It screened at the Toronto International Film Festival on 13 September, and opened the Muestra de Cine de Lanzarote on 22 November. Netflix made the film available for streaming worldwide on 28 October.

== Critical reception ==
On the review aggregator website Rotten Tomatoes, 92% of 49 critics' reviews of the film are positive, with an average rating of 7.50/10; the site's "critics consensus" reads: "Into the Inferno finds director Werner Herzog observing some of the most beautiful -- and terrifying -- wonders of the natural world with his signature blend of curiosity and insight." On Metacritic, it has a weighted average score of 76 out of 100 based on reviews from 17 critics, indicating "generally favorable" reviews.

=== Accolades ===
Year	Award	Category	Result	Ref(s).
2016	Critics' Choice Documentary Awards	Best Director (TV/Streaming)	Nominated	
2016	Critics' Choice Documentary Awards	Best Documentary Feature (TV/Streaming)	Nominated	
2017	FOCAL International Awards	Best Use of Wildlife and Natural History Footage	Nominated	
2017	News & Documentary Emmy Awards	Outstanding Science and Technology Documentary	Nominated	

== Related films by Werner Herzog ==
- La Soufrière (1977) – a short documentary film about an anticipated eruption of the La Grande Soufrière volcano in Guadeloupe
- Encounters at the End of the World (2007) – a documentary film about Antarctica and the people who choose to spend time there, including Oppenheimer, who is featured in the film when Herzog goes to Mount Erebus
- Salt and Fire (2016) – a fictional thriller film about the imminent eruption of a supervolcano in Bolivia
- The Fire Within: A Requiem for Katia and Maurice Krafft (2022) – a documentary film about the French volcanologists, who are discussed in a segment of Into the Inferno. Katia and Maurice Krafft died on 3 June 1991 in a pyroclastic flow produced by the eruption of Mount Unzen in Japan.
