= Cascades Volcano Observatory =

Research center in Washington, United States

Coordinates: 45°36′39″N 122°29′48″W

United States Geological Survey Cascades Volcano Observatory
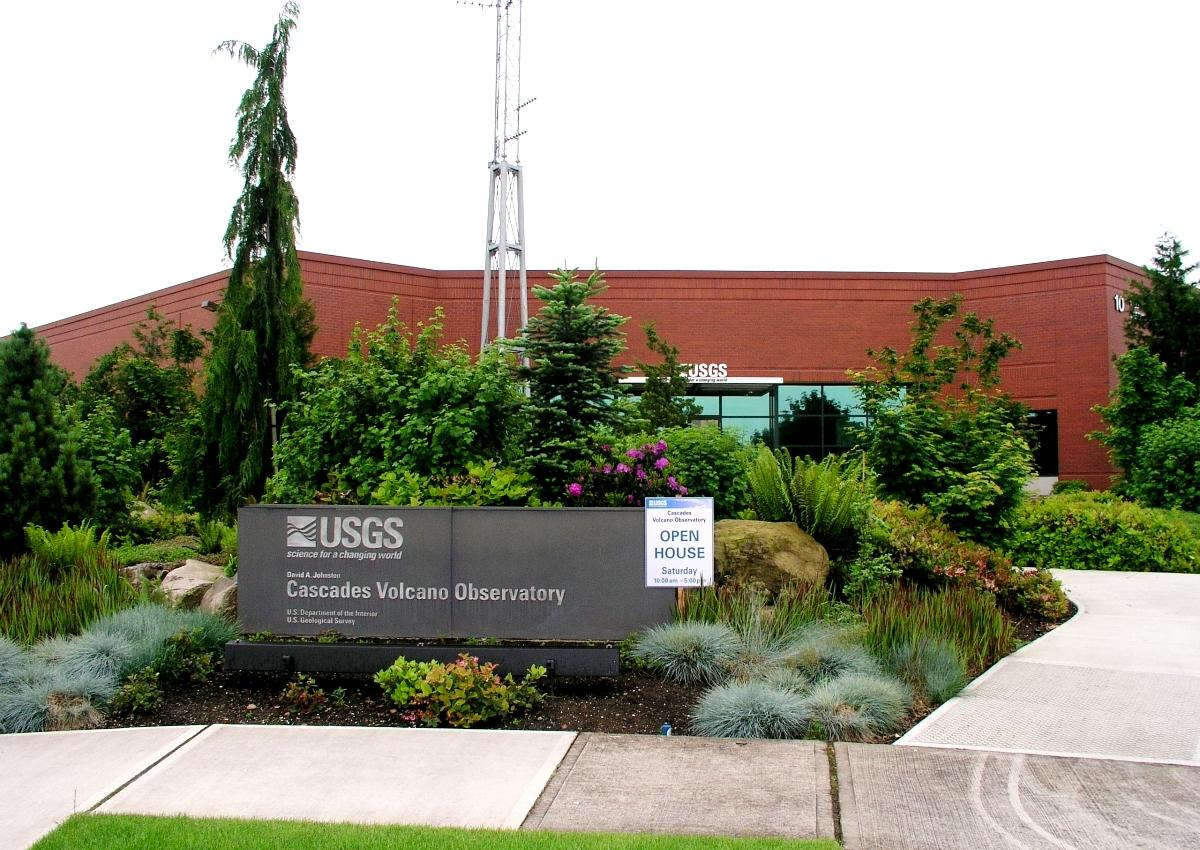
- Front of the main building of the David A. Johnston Cascades Volcano Observatory

Agency overview
- Formed: 1980
- Headquarters: Vancouver, Washington, USA
- Agency executive: Dr. Jon Major, Scientist-in-Charge (USGS)
- Website: https://www.usgs.gov/observatories/cvo

The David A. Johnston Cascades Volcano Observatory (CVO) is a volcano observatory in the US that monitors volcanoes in the northern Cascade Range. It was established in the summer of 1980, after the eruption of Mount St. Helens. The observatory is named for United States Geological Survey (USGS) volcanologist David A. Johnston, who was killed by the 1980 eruption of Mount St. Helens. The observatory's current territory covers Oregon, Washington, and Idaho. The Cascade Range's extent includes northern California, and Cascade volcanoes in that state, such as Mount Shasta and Lassen Peak, previously fell under the CVO's jurisdiction. However, these volcanoes now fall under the jurisdiction of the California Volcano Observatory (CalVO), formed in February 2012 and based in Menlo Park, California, which monitors and researches volcanic activity throughout California and Nevada.

The Cascades Volcano Observatory is part of the USGS, a scientific agency of the United States government. It is located in Vancouver, Washington in the Portland, Oregon metropolitan area.

== Monitored volcanoes ==
This list shows volcanoes currently monitored by the Cascades Volcano Observatory, which range in order of highest to lowest risk assessment.

According to the USGS risk assessment of volcanoes located in the northern Cascades region, the following volcanoes were ranked "very high threat potential".

- Crater Lake in southwestern Oregon near Klamath Falls
- Glacier Peak in northern Washington
- Mount Baker in northern Washington
- Mount Hood in northwestern Oregon near Portland
- Mount Rainier in central Washington near Tacoma
- Mount St. Helens in southwestern Washington near Vancouver
- Newberry Volcano in central Oregon near Bend
- Three Sisters in west central Oregon near Bend

The following volcanoes were ranked "high threat potential":

- Mount Adams in southwestern Washington

The following volcanoes were ranked "moderate threat potential":

- Mount Bachelor in west central Oregon near Bend

The following volcanoes were ranked "Low to Very Low Threat Potential":

- Belknap Crater in central Oregon
- Black Butte Crater Lava Field in southern Idaho near Shoshone
- Blue Lake Crater in northern Oregon
- Cinnamon Butte in southwestern Oregon near Crater Lake
- Craters of the Moon Volcanic Field in southeastern Idaho near Pocatello
- Davis Lake Volcanic Field in central Oregon
- Devils Garden Volcanic Field in central Oregon
- Diamond Craters in southeastern Oregon near Burns
- Hell's Half Acre Lava Field in southeastern Idaho near Idaho Falls
- Indian Heaven in southwestern Washington near Mount St. Helens
- Jordan Craters in southeastern Oregon
- Mount Jefferson in northwestern Oregon
- Sand Mountain Volcanic Field in west central Oregon near Mount Jefferson
- Wapi Lava Field in southeastern Idaho near Pocatello
- West Crater in southwestern Washington near Mount St. Helens

There are other volcanoes in the northern Cascades region that have not been assessed one of these risk levels which warrant monitoring. Volcanoes that have not erupted during the Holocene period were not included. USGS has noted, though less probable, that it is still possible for volcanoes to erupt at longer intervals than mentioned. CVO also does not monitor underwater volcanoes such as Axial Seamount off the coast of Oregon, because underwater volcanoes in the region pose "no threat to people or ocean travel" and "USGS focuses its effort on volcanoes that pose a threat to life and property".
