= Clive Oppenheimer =

British volcanologist

- Born: 28 May 1964 (age 62)
- Education: University of Cambridge (BA); Open University (PhD)
- Known for: Eruptions that Shook the World; Into the Inferno
- Awards: Murchison Award (2005)
- Scientific career
- Fields: Volcanology; Geochemistry; Antarctica
- Workplaces: University of Cambridge
- Thesis: Volcanology from space : applications of infrared remote sensing (1991)
- Doctoral advisor: Peter Francis; David Rothery
- Doctoral students: Marie Edmonds; Kayla Iacovino
- Website: www.geog.cam.ac.uk/people/oppenheimer/

Clive Oppenheimer (born 1964) is a British volcanologist, and Professor of Volcanology in the Department of Geography of the University of Cambridge.

== Education ==
Oppenheimer studied the Natural Sciences Tripos at the University of Cambridge where he was a member of the student geological society, the Sedgwick Club, and where he was awarded a Bachelor of Arts degree in 1986. He has a PhD from the Open University, his thesis investigated the use of remote sensing in volcanology and was supervised by Peter Francis and David Rothery.

== Career and research ==
Oppenheimer's research interests are in volcanology and geochemistry, particularly in Antarctica. He has spent 13 seasons doing field work on Mount Erebus in Antarctica. In addition to his volcanological work he discovered two previously lost campsites used by a group of explorers from Scott's Terra Nova expedition in 1912, now recognised as protected sites under the Antarctic Treaty System.

In 2011, the Government of North Korea invited him, his PhD student Kayla Iacovino, and volcanologist James Hammond of Imperial College, London to study the Baekdu Mountain for recent volcanic activity. Their project was continuing in 2014 and expected to last for another "two or three years". Oppenheimer is co-founder and co-deputy director of the Mt. Paektu Research Centre.

He is a member of the Cambridge Volcanology unit and his former doctoral students include Marie Edmonds.

=== Media appearances ===
Oppenheimer has appeared on BBC Radio 4's The Museum of Curiosity. His hypothetical donation to this imaginary museum was a small tin of magma. He has also appeared on The Infinite Monkey Cage alongside Jo Brand and Tamsin Mather and Midweek and In Our Time on BBC Radio 4.

Oppenheimer has also collaborated with filmmaker Werner Herzog on three documentaries. He appeared in Herzog's films Encounters at the End of the World and is prominently featured in Into the Inferno. In 2020, he made his directorial debut with his third Herzog film, Fireball: Visitors from Darker Worlds, which Oppenheimer and Herzog co-directed.

=== Awards and honours ===
In 2005 he was awarded the Murchison Award by the Royal Geographical Society “for publications judged to contribute most to geographical science in preceding recent years”. In 2024, Oppenheimer was awarded the Volcano and Magmatic Studies Group ThermoFisher Award (now known as the VMSG Award), presented to individuals who “have made a significant advance to our understanding of volcanic and magmatic processes and who has made substantial contributions to the research community.”

=== Selected publications ===
His publications include Eruptions that Shook the World which formed the basis of the 2016 film Into the Inferno directed by Werner Herzog. In 2023, Hodder Press published Mountains of Fire: The Secret Lives of Volcanoes. Writing for Literary Review, John Gribbin said: "This...is neither a dry academic account of his research nor a standard popularisation. Instead, Oppenheimer weaves together science, history and culture into a book that is far greater than the sum of its parts."

- Eruptions that Shook the World
- Volcanoes by Peter Francis and Clive Oppenheimer
- Volcanism and the Earth's Atmosphere
- Volcanic Degassing
