= La Grande Soufrière =

Active stratovolcano in Guadeloupe

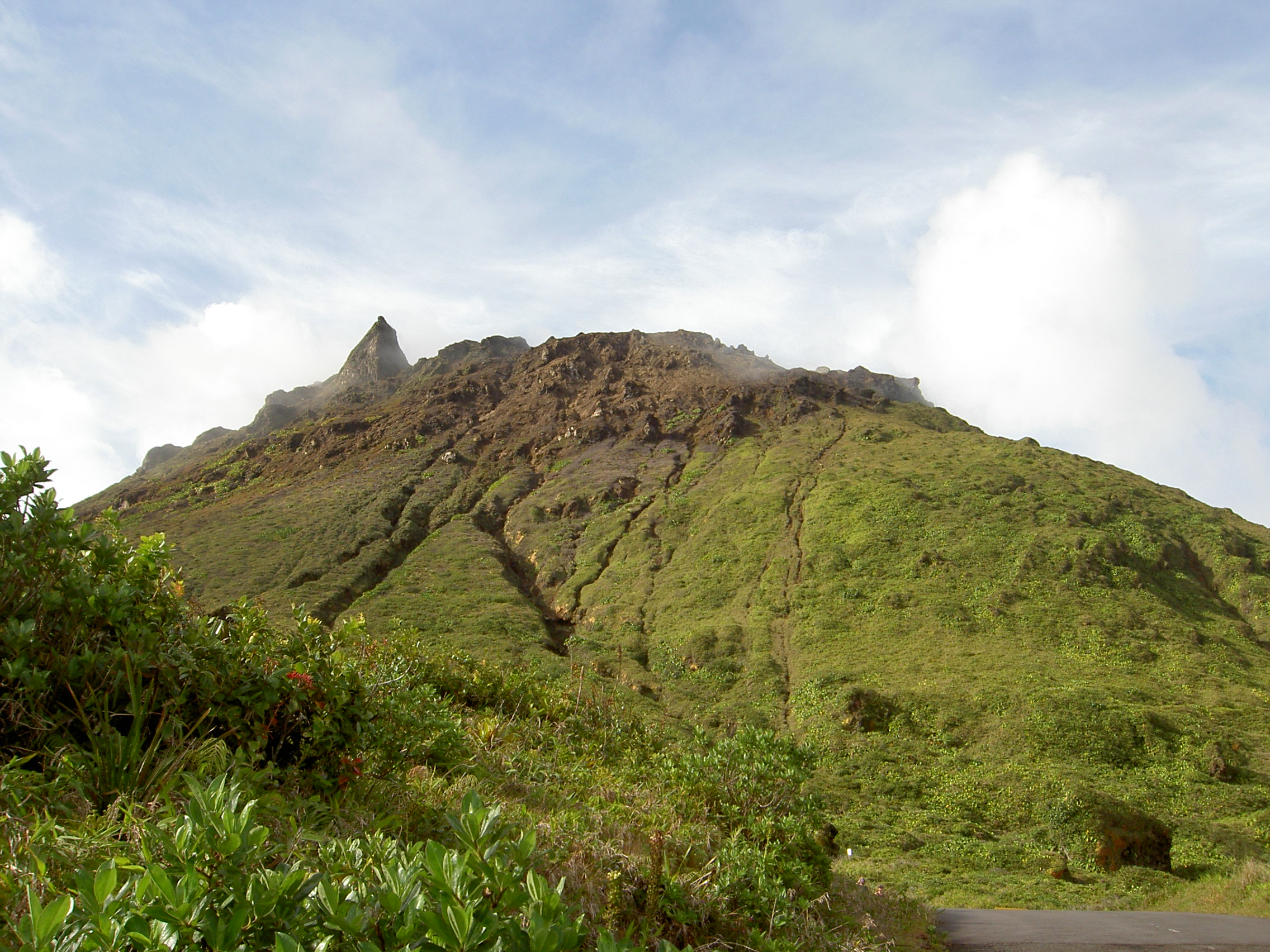

Highest point
- Elevation: 1,467 m (4,813 ft)
- Prominence: 1,467 m (4,813 ft)
- Listing: North America isolated peak 17th; Ribu
- Coordinates: 16°02′40.56″N 61°39′51.12″W

Geography
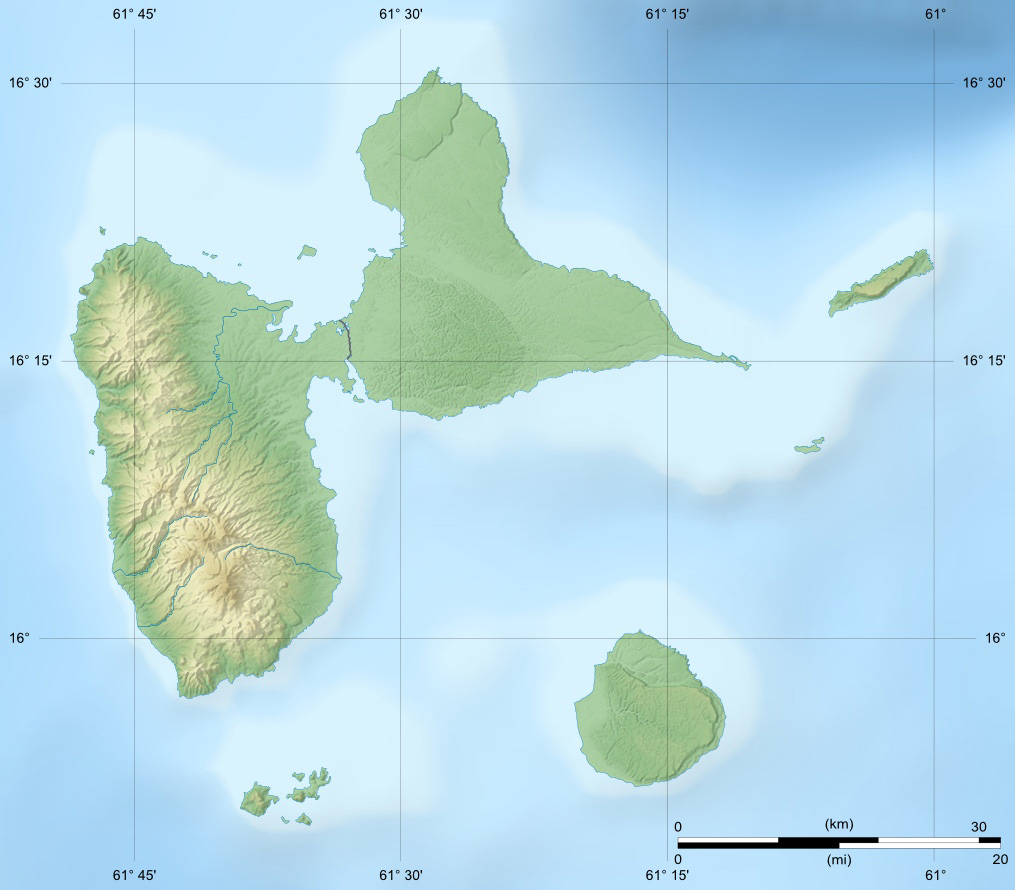
- Location within Guadeloupe
- Location: Guadeloupe, French West Indies

Geology
- Formed by: Subduction zone volcanism
- Mountain type: Stratovolcano
- Volcanic arc: Lesser Antilles Volcanic Arc
- Last eruption: 1977

La Grande Soufrière (French pronunciation: [la ɡʁɑ̃d sufʁijɛʁ]; English: "big sulfur outlet"), or simply Soufrière (Antillean Creole: Soufwiyè), is an active stratovolcano on the French island of Basse-Terre, Guadeloupe. It is the highest mountain peak in the Lesser Antilles, rising 1,467 m (4,813 ft) high.

The last magmatic eruption was in 1530±30 during which the current lava dome was emplaced.

More recent eruptions have been phreatic in type. On February 8, 1843, an eruption of La Grande Soufrière caused by an earthquake killed over 5,000 people.

Significant seismic activity in 1976 led to a mass evacuation of the island's 72,000 residents. There was a bitter, and well-publicized, controversy between scientists Claude Allègre and Haroun Tazieff on whether evacuation should occur. Allègre held that inhabitants should be evacuated, just in case, while Tazieff held that the Soufrière was harmless. The prefect decided to evacuate, erring on the side of caution. The volcano erupted on August 30, 1976, but much less severely than predicted by the Allègre side. There were no fatalities and no significant damage, except for the large cost of the evacuation.

While the island was deserted, the German filmmaker Werner Herzog traveled to the abandoned town of Basse-Terre to find a peasant who had refused to leave his home on the slopes of the volcano. His journey is recorded in the film La Soufrière.

== Gallery ==
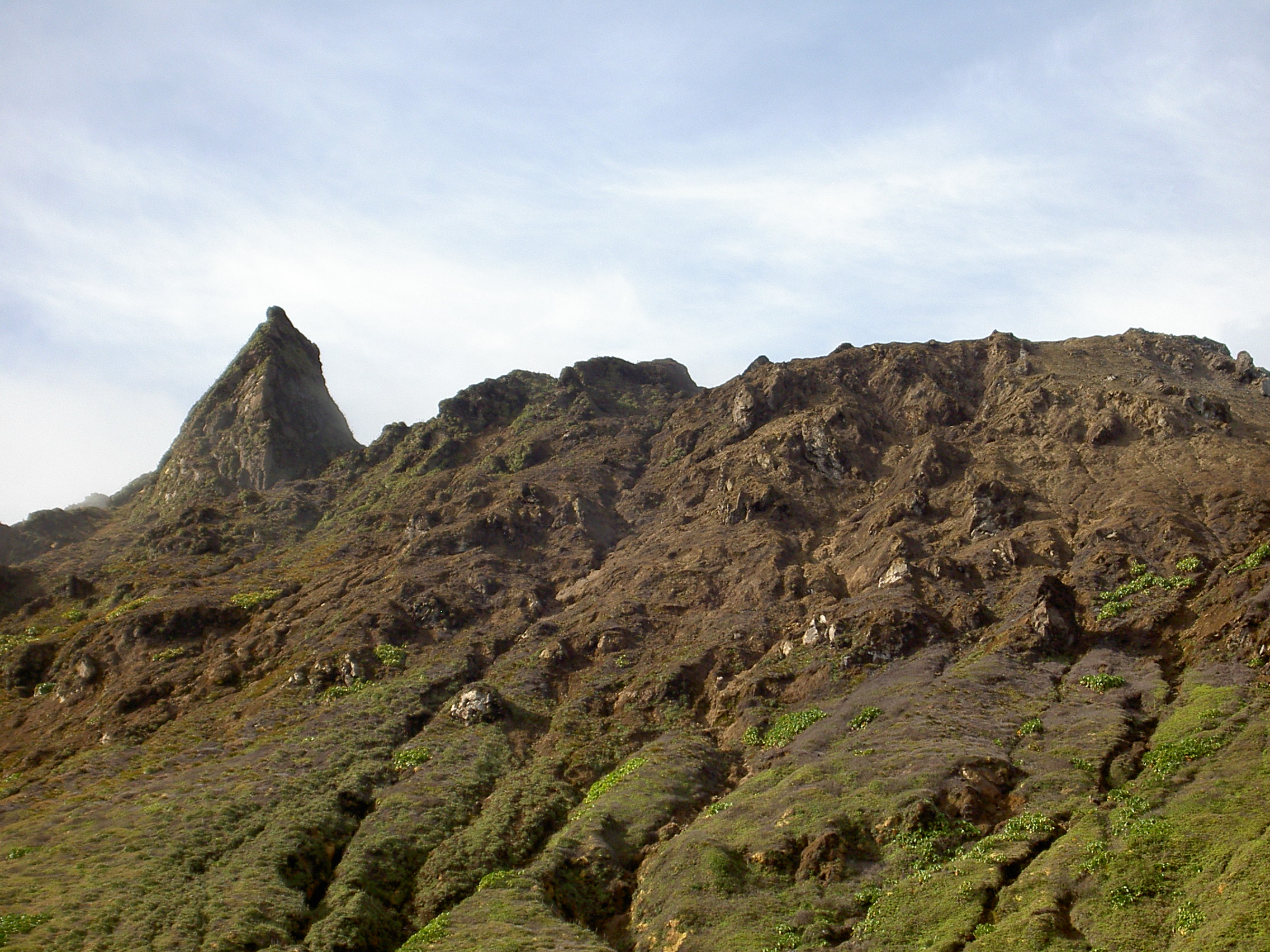

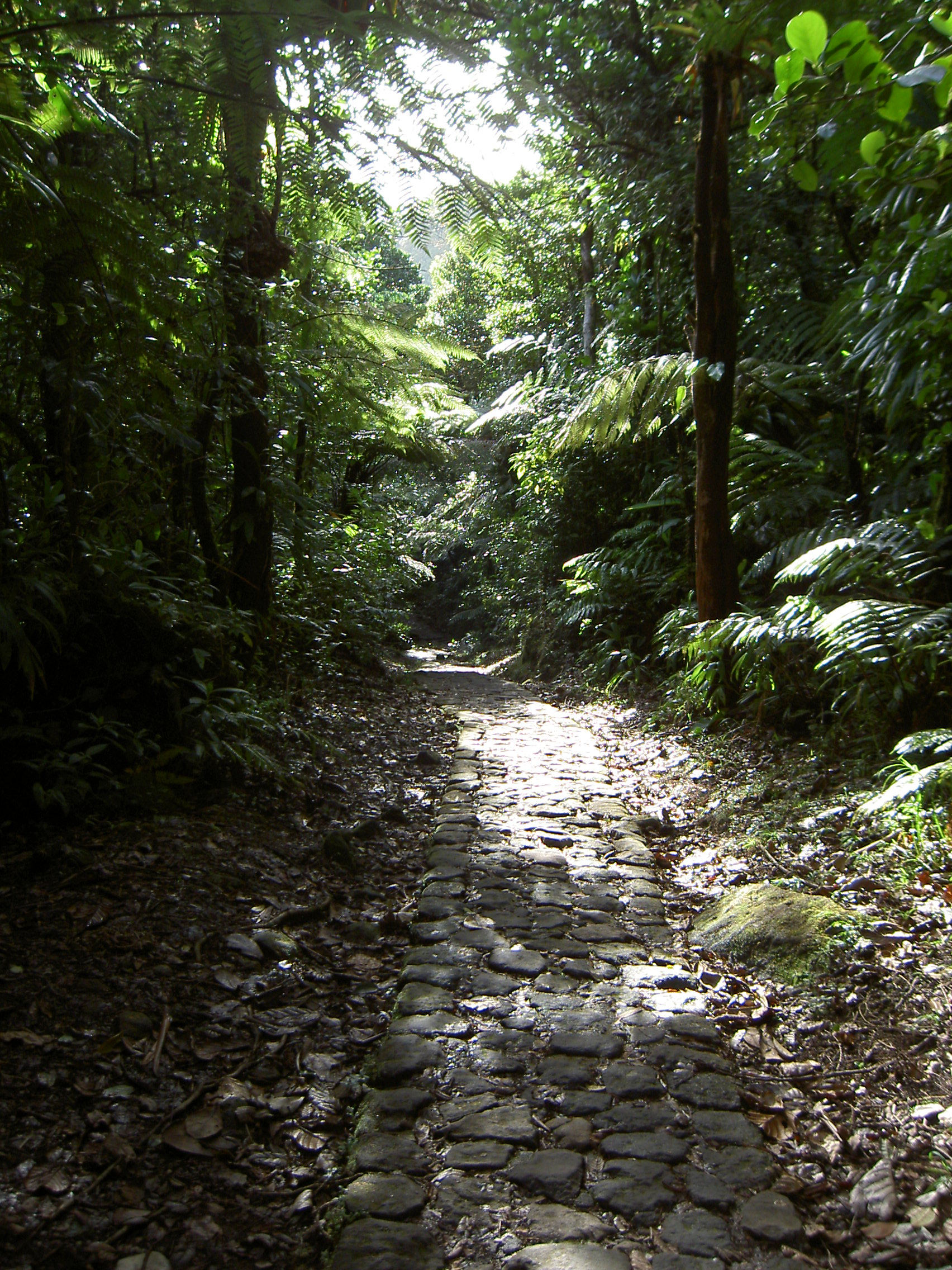

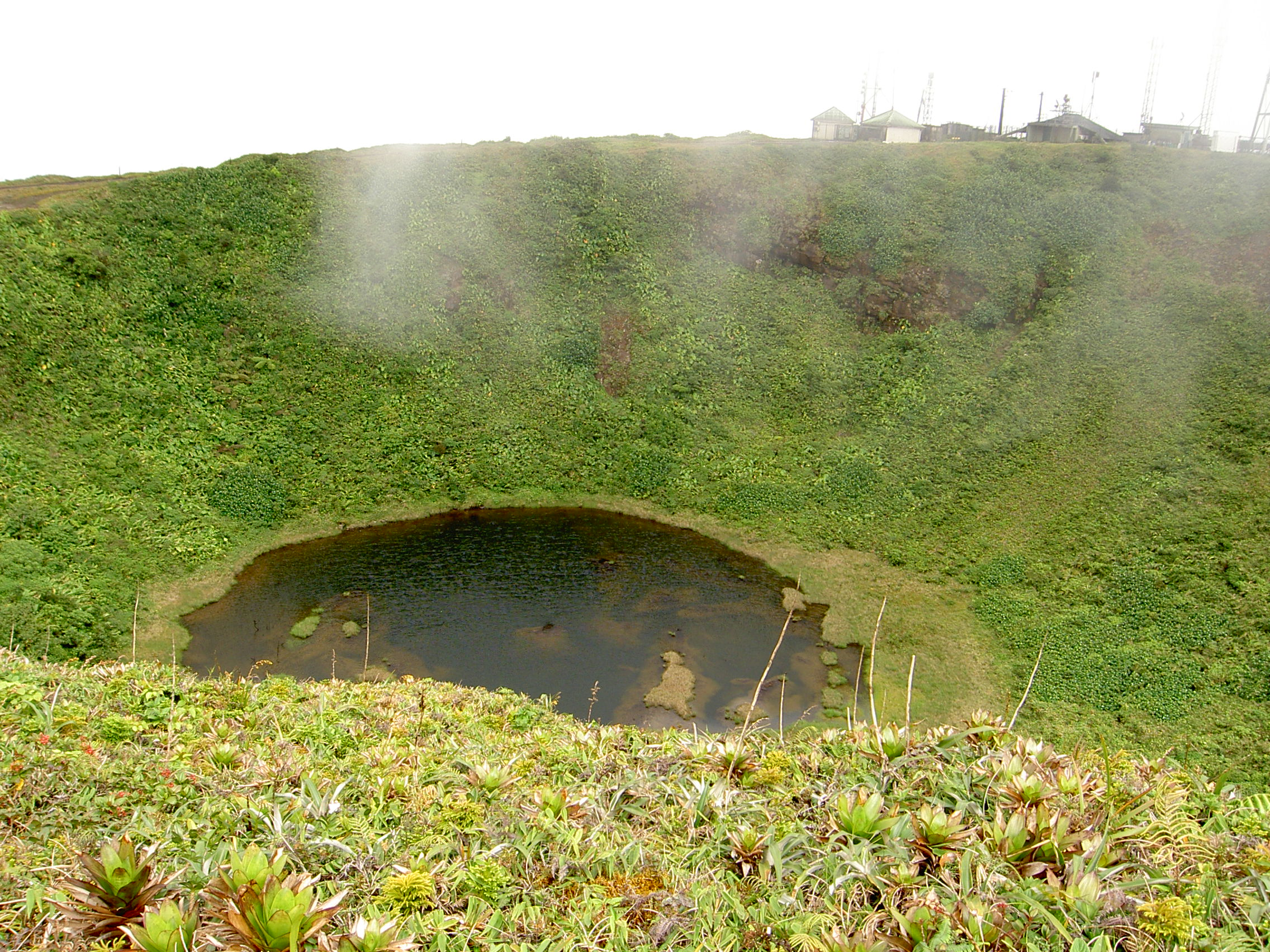

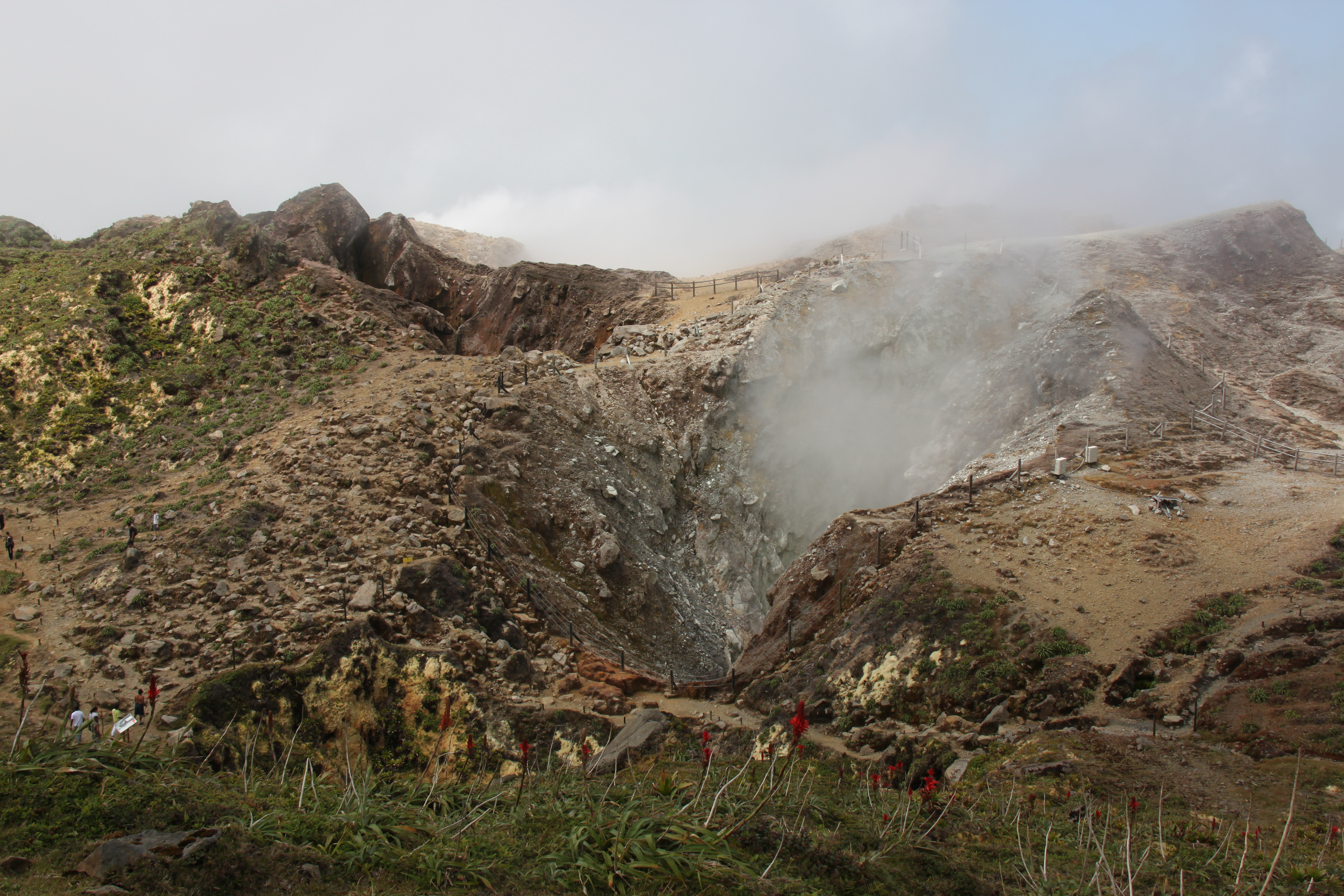

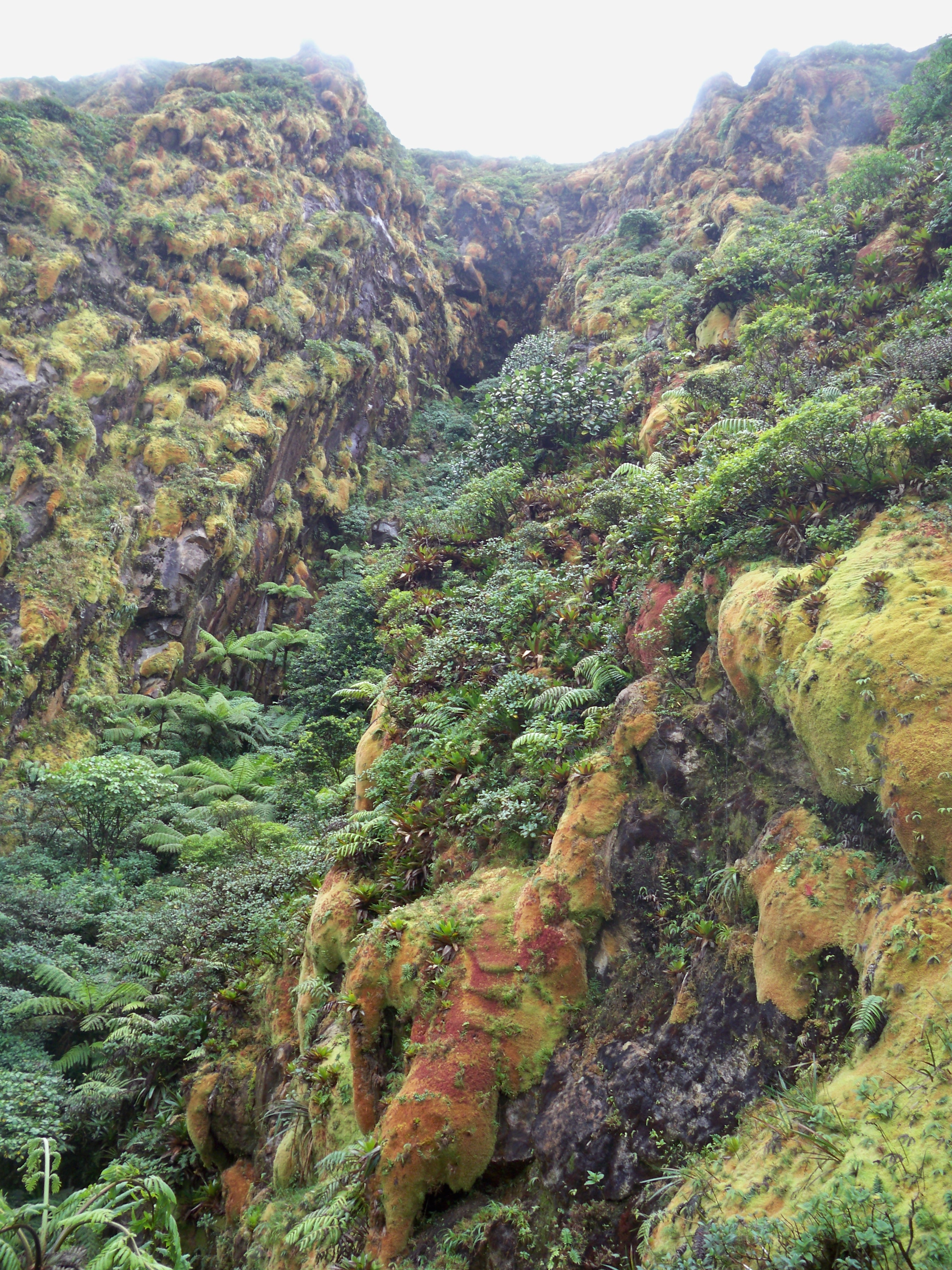

== See also ==
- Lists of volcanoes
- Guadeloupe National Park
