= Saxer =

Saxer is a surname of German origin meaning "of Saxony". Notable people with the surname include:

- Mary Saxer (born 1987), American pole vaulter
- Walter Saxer, producer and screenwriter of Scream of Stone

== See also ==
- Saxer Brewing Company, American brewer now owned by Portland Brewing Company
- Saxer Avenue (SEPTA Route 101 station), trolleybus stop in Pennsylvania
