= Werner Herzog bibliography =

Although primarily known as a filmmaker, Werner Herzog has also written multiple books and other works.

== Bibliography ==
=== Books ===
==== Writer ====
- Fitzcarraldo: The Original Story (Fjord Pr, January 1983, ISBN 978-0-940242-04-3)
- Of Walking in Ice (Free Association, New York, 2007, ISBN 978-0-9796121-0-7)
- Conquest of the Useless: Reflections from the Making of Fitzcarraldo (Eroberung des Nutzlosen) (German: 2004; English: Ecco, 2009, ISBN 978-0061575532)
- Werner Herzog: A Guide for the Perplexed, Conversations with Paul Cronin (Faber and Faber Ltd., London, 2014, ISBN 0-571-20708-1)
- The Twilight World (Das Dämmern der Welt) (German: Hanser, Munich, 2021; English, translated by Michael Hofmann: Bodley Head, London, 2022, ISBN 978-0593490266)
- Every Man for Himself and God Against All: A Memoir (Jeder für sich und Gott gegen alle) (German: Hanser, Munich, 2022; English, translated by Michael Hofmann: Vintage Publishing, London, 2023, ISBN 978-0593490297)
- The Future of Truth (Die Zukunft der Wahrheit) (German: Hanser, Munich, 2024, ISBN 978-3446279438; English, translated by Michael Hofmann: Bodley Head, London, 2025, ISBN 9781847928405)

==== Co-writer ====
- Lena Herzog. Pilgrims: Becoming the Path Itself (Periplus Publishing London Ltd., 2002, ISBN 1-902699-43-2)

=== Screenplays ===
==== Writer ====
- Drehbücher II: Aguirre, der Zorn Gottes: Jeder für sich und Gott gegen alle, Land des Schweigens und der Dunkelheit (Hanser 1977)
- Drehbücher I: Lebenszeichen, Auch Zwerge haben klein angefangen, Fata Morgana (Hanser 1977)
- Drehbücher III: Stroszek, Nosferatu (Hanser 1979)
- Screenplays: Aguirre, The Wrath of God, Every Man For Himself and God Against All & Land of Silence and Darkness (translated by Alan Greenberg & Martje Herzog; Tanam, New York, 1981, ISBN 0-934378-03-7)
- Fitzcarraldo, Nosferatu, Stroszek (Mazarine 1982)
- Wo Die Grünen Ameisen Träumen (Hanser 1984, ISBN 3-446-14106-5)
- Nosferatu (Ulbulibri, 1984)
- Cobra Verde (Jade-Flammarion 2001, ISBN 2-08-203009-1)

==== Co-writer ====
- With Alan Greenberg and Herbert Achternbusch. Heart of Glass. 1976
