= Alan Greenberg (film director) =

American filmmaker and author (born 1950)

- Born: October 14, 1950; New York City, U.S.
- Died: June 4, 2015 (aged 64); Portland, Oregon, U.S.
- Education: Coral Gables Senior High School
- Occupations: Film director; Screenwriter; Author; Photographer
- Children: 2

Alan Greenberg (October 14, 1950 – January 27, 2015) was an American film director, screenwriter, photographer, and author.

== Life and career ==
Greenberg was brought into the film industry by German filmmaker Werner Herzog, with whom he worked for a number of years. His first book, Heart of Glass, about the making of Herzog's film of the same name, was called "The best book on the making of a film ever written" by Rolling Stone magazine. Greenberg revised the book in 2012 as Every Night the Trees Disappear: Werner Herzog and the Making of 'Heart of Glass' and was published by the Chicago Review Press. It featured Greenberg's previously unpublished photographs, which Herzog called "strange and beautiful." Greenberg also translated several of Herzog's works into English, including Fitzcarraldo and Of Walking in Ice.

Greenberg made his directorial debut with the documentary Land of Look Behind, a documentary about Jamaica following the death of Bob Marley. Greenberg had visited Jamaica from a young age and was a friend of Marley. Following Marley's death, his family asked Greenberg to make a film about him. The film that includes footage of Marley's funeral as well as scenes filmed in Jamaica's remote Cockpit Country and the capital city of Kingston. The film ended up being more of a visionary portrait of the Jamaica of that period (focusing on the Rastafari movement and reggae culture) than a film primarily about Marley. The film has won considerable critical acclaim, as well as winning the Gold Hugo Award for Best Documentary in the Chicago International Film Festival.

Greenberg also worked as a special unit photographer on films such as Martin Scorsese's Cape Fear and Bernardo Bertolucci's 1900 and wrote several screenplays, most famously Love in Vain, a poetic account of the mysterious blues genius Robert Johnson. Love in Vain was also the first screenplay ever published by a major house (Doubleday) as literature. Greenberg's last screenplay, Tutankhamun – Lord of Two Lands, a radically researched vision of the boy king's murder intertwined with the intrigue surrounding his tomb's discovery in 1922, was to have been produced in 2013.

== Filmography ==
Directing credits

- Land of Look Behind (1982)
- Living Dreams (1988)

== Bibliography ==
- Greenberg, Alan (1976). Heart of Glass. Text and photos by A. Greenberg, scenario by W. Herzog, based on H. Achternbusch's Die Stunde des Todes. Munich: Skellig.
- Greenberg, Alan (1983). Love in Vain: The Life and Legend of Robert Johnson. 1st ed. A Dolphin book. Garden City, New York: Doubleday. ISBN 0-385-15679-0.
- Greenberg, Alan (1994). Love in Vain: A Vision of Robert Johnson. 1st Da Capo Press ed. New foreword by Martin Scorsese; introduction by Stanley Crouch. Screenplay of an unproduced motion picture. New York: Da Capo Press. (Originally published: Garden City, New York: Doubleday, 1983.) ISBN 0-306-80557-X.
- Greenberg, Alan (2012). Every Night the Trees Disappear: Werner Herzog and the Making of 'Heart of Glass'. Chicago: Chicago Review Press.
