= Manfred Böckl =

German writer (1948–2026)

- Born: 2 September 1948; Landau an der Isar, Bavaria, Germany
- Died: 20 April 2026 (aged 77); Bavaria, Germany
- Other name: Jean de Laforet
- Occupation: Writer

Manfred Böckl (2 September 1948 – 20 April 2026) was a German writer who specialised in historical fiction. From the 1980s, he wrote novels that often revolve around Bavaria, crime, abuse of power and historical renegades and seers. He had a local breakthrough in 1991 with a novel about the Bavarian prophet Mühlhiasl. A recurring subject in Böckl's works was Celtic culture, and he practised Celtic neopaganism.

== Early life and education ==
Manfred Böckl was born in Landau an der Isar in Bavaria, on 2 September 1948. He had a Catholic father and an Evangelical mother. He studied German studies, geography, jurisprudence, history, philosophy, literature, psychology and theology at the University of Regensburg without finishing a degree. From 1973 to 1976, he worked as an editor at the Passauer Neue Presse and after that as a freelance writer.

== Literary career ==
Böckl debuted as a writer in 1966 when he had a novella published. From 1980 to 1984, he published a series of young adult novels, Geheimbund Blaue Rose (lit. 'Blue Rose Secret Society'), written together with Helmut Watzke under the pseudonym Jean de Laforet. Since 1984, he has written a large number of historical novels, often set in Bavaria and revolving around crimes and abuse of power. He described his approach to the genre as trying to intervene socially with lessons from history.

Die Hexe soll brennen (1989, lit. 'The Witch Shall Burn'), set in the Regensburg and Straubing area, is about witch-hunts, a theme that also appears in novels about Agnes Bernauer (1993) and the witch trial of Fuersteneck (1997). Several of Böckl's stories are about historical renegades in conflict with authorities, including novels about Michael Heigl (1990), Georg Jennerwein (1993), Mathias Kneißl (1998) and Alois Irlmaier (1999). A recurring subject is Bavarian prophets, including Mühlhiasl, who is the central character in the 1991 novel Mühlhiasl. Der Seher vom Rabenstein (lit. 'The Seer from Rabenstein'), which became a literary breakthrough for Böckl in Bavaria; as of 2021, it had been published in 10 German editions. It was followed by several novels and non-fiction books about clairvoyants and seers. The history of Bavarian glassworks forms part of the novels Sumava. Ein Epos aus dem Böhmerwald (1992, lit. 'An Epic from the Bohemian Forest') and Der Glasteufel (2002, lit. 'The Glass Devil'). In Bischofsmord und Hexenjagd. Die spektakulärsten Kriminalfälle aus dem historischen Bayern (2015, lit. 'Episcopal Murder and Witch Hunting, The Most Spectacular Criminal Cases from the Historical Bavaria'), Böckl combines his interest in Bavaria and historical crimes and explores the conspiracy theory that Ludwig II of Bavaria was murdered.

Another recurring subject is the Celts and their culture, including Myrddin Wyllt, Boudica, the triple goddess and the druids. Böckl practiced Celtic neopaganism in a form he described as a "spiritual return to Celtic paganism". He explores contemporary religious life and issues of tolerance and fundamentalism in his 2011 book Die kleinen Religionen Europas (lit. 'The Small Religions of Europe').

As of 2016, Böckl's books had sold around one million copies in total. He has had books translated into Italian, Portuguese, Russian, Estonian, Czech, Bulgarian and Dutch. In 2018, on the occasion of his 70th birthday, he published his autobiography Oft war es wie im Roman (lit. 'Often It Was like in a Novel'). In 2019 he publicly denounced Germany's immigration policies under Angela Merkel's government.

== Death ==
Böckl died "suddenly and unexpectedly" at his estate in the Bavarian Forest, on 20 April 2026, at the age of 77.

== Selected publications ==
Novels

- Böckl, Manfred (1989). Die Hexe soll brennen: ein Tatsachenroman aus dem 17. Jahrhundert (in German). Hamburg: FACTA. ISBN 3-926827-20-3. OCLC 20153345.
- Böckl, Manfred (2008). Räuber Heigl der Höhlenmensch vom Kaitersberg (in German). München. ISBN 978-3-86520-297-0. OCLC 259952182.
- Böckl, Manfred (1998). Mühlhiasl der Seher vom Rabenstein; Roman (in German). Waldkirchen. ISBN 978-3-89682-988-7. OCLC 75851010.
- Böckl, Manfred (1992). Šumava: ein Epos aus dem Böhmerwald (in German). Passau: Neue Presse. ISBN 3-924484-48-1. OCLC 27644547.
- Böckl, Manfred (1996). Agnes Bernauer Hexe, Hure, Herzogin (in German). Berlin. ISBN 978-3-7466-1290-4. OCLC 246693883.
- Böckl, Manfred (1993). Jennerwein: Der gewilderte Wildschütz, Roman (in German). München: Ehrenwirth. ISBN 3-431-03284-2. OCLC 29382893.
- Böckl, Manfred (1997). Der Hexenstein : ein Roman aus dunkler Zeit (in German). Waldkirchen: SüdOst Verlag. ISBN 3-89682-002-8. OCLC 39186076.
- Böckl, Manfred (1998). Mathias Kneissl der Raubschütz von der Schachermühle (in German). Dachau. ISBN 978-3-89251-258-5. OCLC 75995724.
- Böckl, Manfred (2009). Prophet der Finsternis Leben und Visionen des Alois Irlmaier (in German). Erfurt. ISBN 978-3-86680-561-3. OCLC 467891387.
- Böckl, Manfred (2002). Die Bischöfin von Rom: Roman (in German). Berlin: Aufbau Taschenbuch. ISBN 3-7466-1293-4. OCLC 54728260.
- Böckl, Manfred (2002). Der Glasteufel: historischer Roman (in German). Dachau: Verl.-Anst. Bayerland. ISBN 3-89251-316-3. OCLC 57635276.
- Böckl, Manfred (2005). Die letzte Königin der Kelten historischer Roman (in German). Berlin. ISBN 978-3-7466-1296-6. OCLC 76562544.
- Böckl, Manfred (2007). Merlin der Druide von Camelot; Roman (in German). Berlin. ISBN 978-3-7466-1299-7. OCLC 180971171.

Non-fiction

- Böckl, Manfred (2017). Der Mühlhiasl seine Prophezeiungen; sein Wissen um Erdstrahlen, Kraftplätze und Heilige Orte, sein verborgenes Leben (in German). Regenstauf. ISBN 978-3-95587-057-7. OCLC 986999626.
- Böckl, Manfred (2004). Die Botschaft der Druiden Weisheit aus der Anderswelt (in German). Saarbrücken. ISBN 978-3-89060-073-4. OCLC 76519359.
- Böckl, Manfred (2003). Ceridwen die Rückkehr der dreifaltigen Göttin der Kelten; ein Buch des Kelten (in German). Saarbrücken. ISBN 978-3-89060-065-9. OCLC 76523973.
- Böckl, Manfred (2005). Merlin Leben und Vermächtnis des keltischen Menschheitslehrers (in German). Uhlstädt-Kirchhasel. ISBN 978-3-935581-95-0. OCLC 181519655.
- Böckl, Manfred (2011). Die kleinen Religionen Europas: woher sie kommen und welchen Einfluss sie haben (in German). Ostfildern: Patmos. ISBN 978-3-8436-0000-2. OCLC 723262086.
- Böckl, Manfred; SüdOst Verlag (2015). Bischofsmord und Hexenjagd die spektakulärsten Kriminalfälle aus dem historischen Bayern (in German). Regenstauf. ISBN 978-3-86646-714-9. OCLC 908642457.
- Böckl, Manfred (2018). Oft war es wie im Roman mein Schriftstellerleben mit allen Höhen, Tiefen, Verrücktheiten, Erkenntnissen und vielem mehr (in German). Regenstauf: SüdOst Verlag. ISBN 978-3-86646-783-5. OCLC 1044936450.
