= Clemens Scheitz =

German actor, musician (1899–1980)

- Born: 2 September 1899; Munich, German Empire
- Died: 24 October 1980 (aged 81); Munich-Haidhausen, West Germany
- Occupation(s): Actor, inventor, musician
- Years active: 1922–1979

Clemens Scheitz (2 September 1899 – 24 October 1980) was a German musician and actor who appeared in the Werner Herzog films The Enigma of Kaspar Hauser (1974), Heart of Glass (1976), Stroszek (1977) and Nosferatu the Vampyre (1979).

== Life ==
He was born in Munich where his father was a tailor and he had an interest in physics and was a self-taught pianist. He earned a living through concert performances, piano lessons, small acting roles, and as an inventor. As a young man he appeared in a 1922 silent film directed by Adolf Wenter and starring Victor Colani entitled The Prince Regatta. He also supplied music for the Herzog film Woyzeck (1979).

== Filmography ==
Year	Title	Role	Notes
1974	The Enigma of Kaspar Hauser	Scribe	
1976	Heart of Glass	Adalbert	
1977	Stroszek	Scheitz	
1977	Die Jugendstreiche des Knaben Karl		
1979	Nosferatu the Vampyre	Clerk	
