= Semmelrogge =

Semmelrogge is a German surname. Notable people with the surname include:

- Martin Semmelrogge (born 1955), German actor, son of Willy
- Willy Semmelrogge (1923–1984), German actor
