= Art and Upheaval =

2008 nonfiction book by William Cleveland

Art and Upheaval: Artists on the Worlds’ Frontlines
- Author: William Cleveland
- Publication date: 2008

Art and Upheaval: Artists on the Worlds’ Frontlines is a 2008 non-fiction book by William Cleveland, with a foreword by Clarissa Pinkola Estés. The book focuses on artists in Australia, Cambodia, Northern Ireland, South Africa, Watts California and Serbia/Bosnia.

== Synopsis ==
Art and Upheaval documents artists in six parts of the world who have been working to rebuild peace and the culture of their communities following major social trauma. The book illustrates how opposing forces in the same community can come together under the umbrella of art for the purpose of social, political and economic change. Featured artists include The Watts Prophets of Los Angeles, California; DAH Teatar, a theater group of the former Yugoslavia; Trevor Jamison, Australian Aboriginal storyteller, writer and actor; Walter Kefu Chakela, South African playwright; Kim Berman, facilitator and print-maker; Ly Daravuth, Cambodian facilitator and artist; and numerous artists involved in the Community Arts Forum in Belfast.

== Reception ==
Critical reception has been positive. Yes! magazine reviewed the work and gave it a positive review. Resurgence & Ecologist also favorably reviewed the work, writing "Cleveland’s in-depth writing about artists in far corners pulling together and creating moral centres for healing and political reconciliation is sometimes ponderous but couldn’t be more timely or relevant now that we have a global leader in Barack Obama who has made community-organising the centrepiece of his presidency."
