= Land of Look Behind =

- DVD cover
- Directed by: Alan Greenberg
- Produced by: Alan Greenberg
- Starring: Bob Marley; Louis Lepkie; Mutabaruka; Gregory Isaacs
- Cinematography: Jörg Schmidt-Reitwein
- Music by: K. Leimer
- Distributed by: Solo Man; Subversive Cinema
- Release date: December 26, 1982
- Running time: 90 minutes
- Country: United States
- Language: English

Land of Look Behind is a 1982 documentary film about Jamaica. It was filmed in May and June of 1981 by Alan Greenberg, and was the director's first film. The film's cinematographer was Jörg Schmidt-Reitwein, an associate of Werner Herzog. The musical score is by K. (Kerry) Leimer.

The film begins with footage of Jamaica's wild interior region called the Cockpit Country. It also features footage of the funeral of reggae musician Bob Marley. A number of Rastafari are interviewed, and performers Gregory Isaacs and Mutabaruka are also featured. In addition, Father Amde Hamilton of The Watts Prophets performs a spoken word piece during Marley's funeral service.

Land of Look Behind won the Chicago International Film Festival's Gold Hugo Award.

Werner Herzog has said in the film's DVD commentary that "This film achieves things never seen before in the history of cinema." The American director Jim Jarmusch writes in the DVD liner notes that Land of Look Behind is "striking...beautiful...near-perfect."

In 2007, the film was released on DVD, with interviews of and commentary by Greenberg and Herzog.
