= The Enigma of Kaspar Hauser =

1974 West German film by Werner Herzog

- DVD cover
- Directed by: Werner Herzog
- Written by: Werner Herzog
- Produced by: Werner Herzog; Walter Saxer
- Starring: Bruno S.; Walter Ladengast
- Cinematography: Jörg Schmidt-Reitwein
- Edited by: Beate Mainka-Jellinghaus
- Music by: Florian Fricke
- Production companies: Werner Herzog Filmproduktion; Filmverlag der Autoren; ZDF
- Distributed by: Werner Herzog Filmproduktion
- Release date: 1 November 1974
- Running time: 109 minutes
- Country: West Germany
- Languages: German; English

The Enigma of Kaspar Hauser (German: Jeder für sich und Gott gegen alle; lit. Every Man for Himself and God Against All) is a 1974 West German drama film written and directed by Werner Herzog and starring Bruno S. and Walter Ladengast. The film closely follows the real story of foundling Kaspar Hauser, using the text of actual letters found with Hauser.

== Plot ==
The film follows Kaspar Hauser, who has lived the first seventeen years of his life chained in a tiny cellar with only a toy horse to occupy his time, devoid of all human contact except for a man wearing a black overcoat and top hat, who feeds him.

One day, in 1828, the same man takes Hauser out of his cell, teaches him a few phrases, and how to walk, before leaving him in the town of Nuremberg. Hauser becomes the subject of much curiosity, and is exhibited in a circus before being rescued by Professor Georg Friedrich Daumer, who patiently attempts to transform him.

Hauser soon learns to read and write, and develops unorthodox approaches to logic and religion; but music is what pleases him most. He attracts the attention of academics, clergy and nobility. He is then physically attacked by the same unknown man who brought him to Nuremberg. The attack leaves him unconscious with a bleeding head. He recovers, but is again mysteriously attacked; this time, stabbed in the chest.

Hauser rests in bed describing visions he has had of nomadic Berbers in the Sahara, and then dies. An autopsy reveals an enlarged liver and cerebellum.

== Cast ==
The casting and character names are based on the submission to the Academy of Motion Picture Arts & Sciences:

- Bruno S. as Kaspar Hauser
- Walter Ladengast as Professor Georg Friedrich Daumer
- Brigitte Mira as Frau Käthe, housekeeper for Professor Daumer
- Reinhard Hauff as a farmer
- Herbert Fritsch as the Mayor
- Florian Fricke as M. Florian, the blind pianist
- Henry van Lyck as the Cavalry Captain
- Willy Semmelrogge as the Circus Director
- Michael Kroecher as Lord Stanhope
- Hans Musäus as an unknown man
- Volker Prechtel as Hiltel, the prison guard
- Gloria Doer as Frau Hiltel
- Marcus Weller as Julius, the son of Hiltel
- Herbert Achternbusch as the Bavarian chicken hypnotizer
- Wolfgang Bauer as a farmboy
- Wilhelm Bayer as the taunting farmboy
- Franz Brumbach as the bear trainer
- Johannes Buzalski as the Police Inspector
- Helmut Döring as the Little King
- Enno Patalas as Pastor Fuhrmann
- Clemens Scheitz as the Scribe
- Alfred Edel as the professor of logic
- Andi Gottwald as the young Mozart
- Kidlat Tahimik as Hombrecito

== Production ==
=== Writing ===
Herzog has been quoted as saying that the title for the film (German: Jeder für sich und Gott gegen alle) was inspired by a sentence in the novel Macunaíma by Brazilian writer Mário de Andrade.

The film follows the real story of Kaspar Hauser quite closely, using the text of actual letters found with Hauser, and following many details in the opening sequence of Hauser's confinement and release. The characters of Professor Daumer and of Lord Stanhope are also based on historical figures, Georg Friedrich Daumer and Philip Henry Stanhope, 4th Earl Stanhope, respectively.

An English-language translation of the screenplay was published in 1980 by Tanam Press.

=== Casting and crew ===
Herzog discovered the lead actor, Bruno Schleinstein, in a documentary about street musicians Bruno der Schwarze, es blies ein Jäger wohl in sein Horn (lit. Bruno the Black One, A Hunter Blows his Horn). Fascinated, Herzog cast him as the lead for The Enigma of Kaspar Hauser despite the fact that he had no training as an actor. Further, the historical Hauser was 17 when he was discovered in Nuremberg and the film implies this. Schleinstein was 41 years old at the time of filming, although his character is treated and described throughout as a youth. Schleinstein's own life bore some similarities to Kaspar Hauser's, and his own unbalanced personality was often expressed on set. In Herzog's commentary for the English language DVD release, he recalls that Schleinstein remained in costume for the entire duration of the production, even after shooting was done for the day. Herzog once visited him in his hotel room, to find him sleeping on the floor by the door, in his costume. Schleinstein was credited only as "Bruno S." in the film. Herzog subsequently wrote Schleinstein into the screenplay for a second film, Stroszek (1977).

The production designer for the film was Henning von Gierke; the costume designers were Ann Poppel and Gisela Storch.

=== Filming locations ===
The outdoor scenes were filmed in the town of Dinkelsbühl and on a nearby mountain called Hesselberg.

- Croagh Patrick, Westport, Mayo, Ireland (archive footage)
- Dinkelsbühl, Bavaria, West Germany
- Western Sahara

=== Music ===
The music includes pieces by a number of notable composers:

- Wolfgang Amadeus Mozart – "Dies Bildnis ist bezaubernd schön" (1791) (from the opera "Die Zauberflöte") – sung by Heinrich Knote (1911)
- Johann Pachelbel – Canon in D Major (1700)
- Orlando di Lasso – Requiem à 5
- Tomaso Albinoni – Adagio – arrangement: Remo Giazotto (ca 1945)

== Reception ==
=== Critical response ===
In 2005, critic Walter Chaw summed up the film as "a strange, brave performance housed in an anti-linear film stuffed with obscure images and silent passages of profound, frightening insight", adding "That the director identifies so deeply with a foundling in 19th century Germany who appeared in the middle of a town square having spent his whole life chained to a floor in a basement dungeon speaks volumes to Herzog's feeling of detachment in intellectual, artistic, and social environments." In 2007, the critic Roger Ebert wrote a retrospective review of the film, which he had included in his list of "Great Movies", saying "In Herzog the line between fact and fiction is a shifting one. He cares not for accuracy but for effect, for a transcendent ecstasy."

Writing in 2001, Maria Racheva said ".. Herzog, the director, unlike François Truffaut in The Wild Child, is not interested in showing the painful process of adaptation to civilized surroundings; Kaspar has a special consciousness in which the laws of nature have a central place and in which the conventions and norms of civilized behavior are as artificial and inconvenient to him as the black dinner jacket he is forced to wear. His difficulties in communication are not the result of any linguistic inadequacies; simply, he is "different" from other men. That is why Herzog seems to wish to persuade us that, despite being gratuitous, both the early isolation and the surprising death of his hero are somehow logical. ... This summary of plot sounds like a fairy tale—and it is. Most of Herzog's films recall fables, and that is surely one of the reasons for their success."

On review aggregator website Rotten Tomatoes, the film holds a 92% score based on 24 reviews, with an average rating of 8.7/10.

In 2017 David Fear and Peter Travers, in Rolling Stone magazine, said: "Based on the true story of a young man who spent the first 17 years of his life never leaving his tiny room – and then became a public sensation when he finally ventured out into society – Herzog's cracked biopic would have felt offbeat and intriguing enough on its own. Still, the director thought he'd make things even more interesting by casting a 41-year-old street musician credited as "Bruno S." who had spent decades in and out of mental institutions and had never acted before. The result is one of the more odd and affecting performances in Herzog's movies – part guileless, part gimmicky and all genuinely WTF. A bold experiment that paid off in a big way."

=== Accolades ===
The film was invited for the 1975 Cannes Film Festival. It won the Grand Prix Spécial du Jury, which is the second prize for films "in competition" at the festival; the first is the Palme d'Or. In addition, it won the FIPRESCI Prize and the Prize of the Ecumenical Jury. The film won two German Film Awards: to Beate Mainka-Jellinghaus for editing, and to Henning von Gierke for scene design. Herzog won the film award in silver (Filmband in Silber), being the only film awarded in the category "Feature Film Direction" (programmfüllender Spielfilm (Gestaltung)), which came with a substantial cash prize. The film was selected as the West German entry for the Best Foreign Language Film at the 48th Academy Awards, but was not accepted as a nomination.

== Home media ==
The Enigma of Kaspar Hauser was released to region 1 DVD in 2002. The film is included in a Blu-ray (region-A) collection of Herzog's films that was published in the US in 2014 by Shout Factory. It was also included in a region-B collection published in the United Kingdom in 2014 by the BFI. It had been released in 1993 as a VHS tape with the English language title The Mystery of Kaspar Hauser.

== See also ==
- New German Cinema
- List of submissions to the 48th Academy Awards for Best Foreign Language Film
- List of German submissions for the Academy Award for Best Foreign Language Film
- Werner Herzog bibliography
- Feral child
