= Volker Prechtel =

German actor (1941–1997)

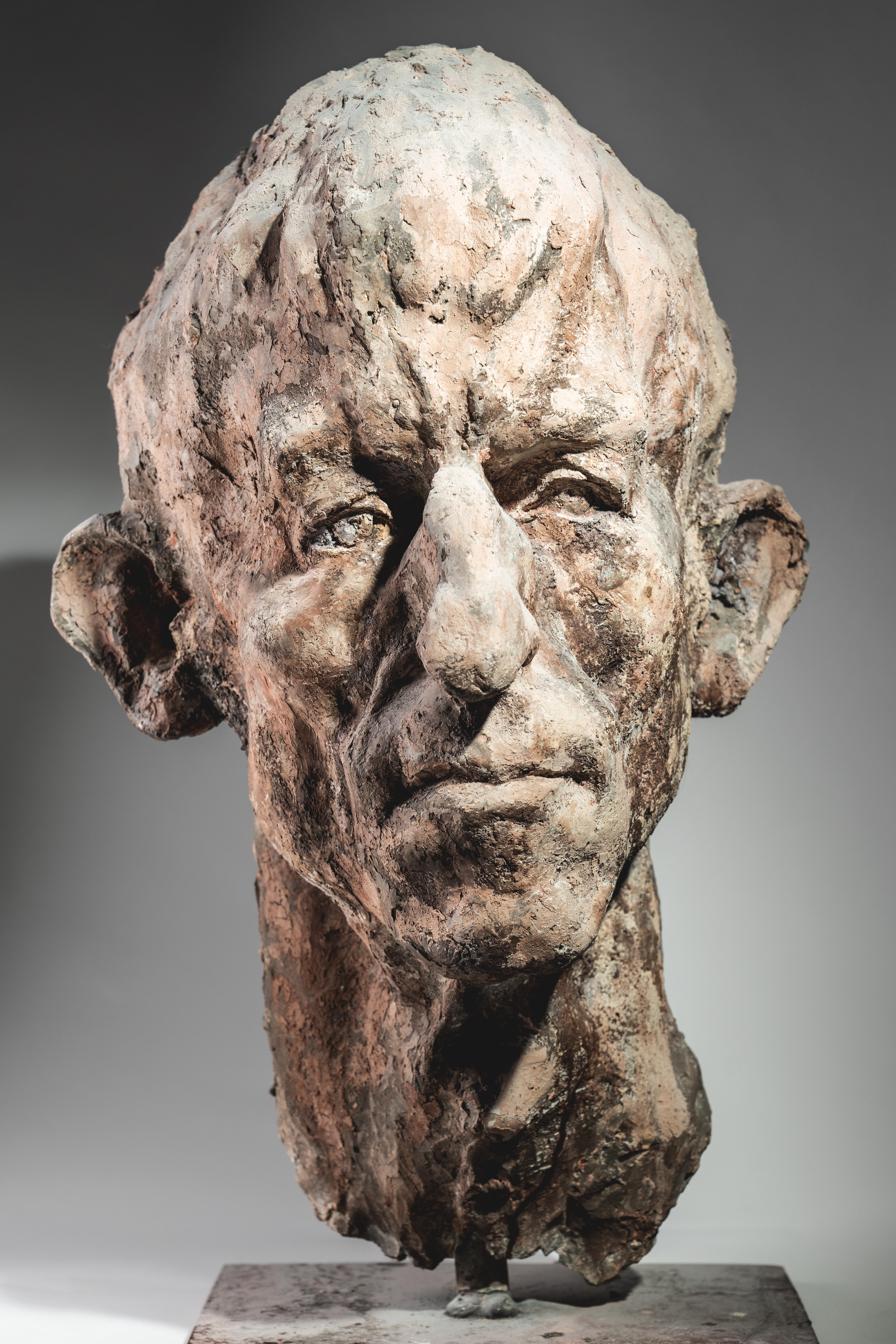
- In 1995 the sculptor Wolfgang Eckert modelled the actor Volker Prechtel in his apartment. The portrait sculpture depicted is a sculpture cast in concrete and finished with adhesive-bound clay. The photograph was taken in the studio of the artist who owns the portrait.
- Born: 9 August 1941; Füssen, Bavaria, Germany
- Died: 7 August 1997 (aged 55); Gröbenzell, Bavaria, Germany
- Occupation: Actor
- Years active: 1974–1997

Volker Prechtel (9 August 1941 – 7 August 1997) was a German actor. He appeared in more than 50 films and television shows between 1974 and 1997.

== Filmography ==
Year	Title	Role	Notes
1974	The Hunter of Fall	Leitner	
1974	The Enigma of Kaspar Hauser	Hiltel the prison guard	
1974	Derrick	Innkeeper	Season 2, Episode 9: "Ein Koffer aus Salzburg"
1976	Crime and Passion	Gastwirt	
1976	The Sternstein Manor	Holzhacker	
1976	The Marquise of O	Der Pfarrer	
1976	Heart of Glass	Wudy	
1976	Die Wilderer		
1977	Natascha – Todesgrüße aus Moskau	CIA-Mann	
1979	Woyzeck	Handwerksbursche	
1980	Das gefrorene Herz	Sargmacher	
1981	Ach du lieber Harry	Etagenkellner	
1982	Piratensender Power Play	Gerichtsbediensteter	Uncredited
1985	Big Mäc		
1986	Tanner	Fuhrhalter Suter	
1986	The Name of the Rose	Malachia	
1988	Starke Zeiten	Krankenpfleger	
1988	Zimmer 36		
1989	Waller's Last Trip	Karg	
1991	The Serbian Girl		
1991	Sisi und der Kaiserkuß	Hias von Konnersreuth	
1991	Scream of Stone	Himalaja-Bezwinger	
1992	Ein Fall für TKKG: Drachenauge	Pingling / Ritter von Zährenstein	
1993	Das Geheimnis	Staudammwärter	
1994	Pumuckl und der blaue Klabauter	Stammtisch	
1996	Life Is a Bluff	Pfarrer	
1997	Lorenz im Land der Lügner	Spitzel	
