= Herakles (film) =

1962 short film by Werner Herzog

- The opening shot of Herakles
- Directed by: Werner Herzog
- Written by: Werner Herzog
- Produced by: Walter Krüttner
- Cinematography: Jaime Pacheco
- Music by: Uwe Brandner
- Release date: 1962
- Running time: 9 minutes
- Language: German

Herakles (Heracles) is a 1962 short film and the first film by the German director Werner Herzog, then 19 years old.

The film relates to six of the twelve labours of Heracles. The film starts with shots of young male bodybuilders working out in a gym, posing on a stage and flexing their muscles. Each of the labours are then announced by on-screen text in the form of a question, followed by related scenes of modern challenges intercut with the bodybuilders. The audio track of the film is saxophone jazz and sounds from a gym.

The question Wird er den Augiasstall säubern? (Will he clean the Augean stables?) is followed by scenes of a garbage dump, Wird er die lernäische Schlange töten? (Will he kill the Lernaean Hydra?) is followed by a huge line of stopped traffic on a motorway and people walking around outside their cars, Wird er die Rosse des Diomedes bezähmen? (Will he tame the Mares of Diomedes?) is followed by scenes of car racing and several race crashes including a crash into the spectators and shots of the subsequent disaster and piles of bodies, Wird er die Amazonen besiegen? (Will he defeat the Amazonians? (Hippolyta)) is followed by scores of young women marching in uniform, Wird er die Giganten bezwingen? (Will he conquer the giants? (Geryon)) is followed by shots of rubble of a destroyed apartment building and men in uniform searching the wreckage, Wird er sich der stymphalischen Vögel erwehren? (Will he resist the Stymphalian birds?) is followed by jets flying in formation, shooting missiles and dropping bombs on training targets. The last shot of the film is of a bodybuilder's buttocks as he goes off the stage through the stage curtains.

== Director's thoughts ==
My most immediate and radical lesson came from what was my first blunder, Herakles. It was a good thing to have made this little film first – rather than jump into something much more meaningful to me – because from that moment on I had a much better idea as to how I should go about my business. Learning from your mistakes is the only real way to learn.

For my first film Herakles I needed a good amount of cash, relatively speaking, because I wanted to start shooting in 35 mm and not 16 mm. For me filmmaking was only 35 mm; everything else seemed amateurish. 35 mm had the capacity to demonstrate, more than anything else, whether or not I had anything to offer, and when I started out I thought to myself, 'If I fail, I will fail so hard that I will never recover.'

Looking back on Herakles today, I find the film rather stupid and pointless, though at the time it was an important test for me. It taught me about editing together very diverse material that would not normally sit comfortably as a whole. For the film I took stock footage of an accident at Le Mans where something like eighty people died after fragments of a car flew into the spectators' stand, and inter-cut it with footage of bodybuilders, including Mr. Germany 1962. For me it was fascinating to edit material together that had such separate and individual lives. The film was some kind of an apprenticeship for me. I just felt it would be better to make a film than go to film school.

— Werner Herzog, Herzog on Herzog
