= Christian Wagner (director) =

German film director

- Born: 26 September 1959 (age 66); Immenstadt, West Germany
- Occupation: Film director
- Years active: 1978-present

Christian Wagner (born 26 September 1959) is a German film director, producer and screenwriter. He has directed twelve films since 1981. His 1995 film Transatlantis was entered into the 45th Berlin International Film Festival.

== Selected filmography ==
- Waller's Last Trip (1989)
- Transatlantis (1995)
- Ghettokids (2002)
- Warchild (2006)
- The Limits of Patience (2014, TV film)
