= Aschau im Chiemgau =

- Municipality
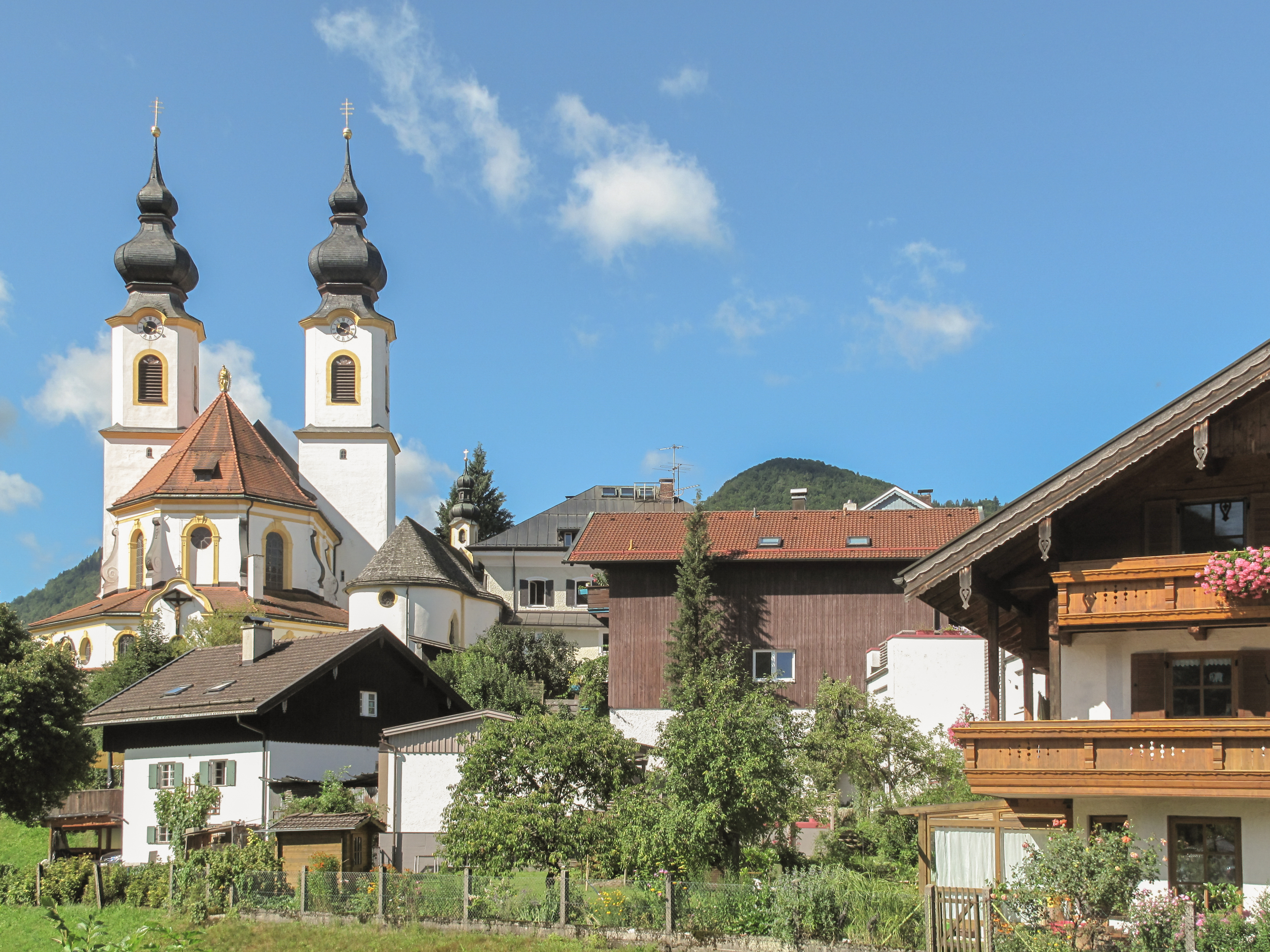
- Church of Maria Lichtmess in Aschau im Chiemgau

- Coat of arms

- Location of Aschau im Chiemgau within Rosenheim district
- Interactive map of Aschau im Chiemgau
- Location within Germany Location within Bavaria
- Coordinates: 47°46′N 12°19′E
- Country: Germany
- State: Bavaria
- Admin. region: Oberbayern
- District: Rosenheim

Government
  - Mayor (2020–26): Simon Frank

Area
  - Total: 79.59 km^{2} (30.73 sq mi)
- Elevation: 615 m (2,018 ft)

Population (2025-12-31)
  - Total: 5,439
  - Density: 68.34/km^{2} (177.0/sq mi)
- Time zone: UTC+01:00 (CET)
  - Summer (DST): UTC+02:00 (CEST)
- Postal codes: 83229
- Dialling codes: 08052, 08057 (Sachrang)
- Vehicle registration: RO
- Website: www.aschau.de

Aschau im Chiemgau (German pronunciation: [ˈaʃaʊ ʔɪm ˈkiːmɡaʊ], lit. 'Aschau in the Chiemgau') is a municipality and a village in the district of Rosenheim in Bavaria in Germany.

== Parts ==
The municipality contains 44 Gemeindeteile:

- Aschach
- Markt Aschau im Chiemgau
- Attich
- Aufham
- Außerkoy
- Außerwald
- Bach
- Berg
- Brückl
- Bucha
- Einfang
- Engerndorf
- Fellerer
- Göttersberg
- Grattenbach
- Grenzhub
- Grünwald
- Hainbach
- Haindorf
- Hammerbach
- Hintergschwendt
- Hohenaschau im Chiemgau
- Höhenberg
- Hub
- Huben
- Innerkoy
- Innerwald
- Kohlstatt
- Mitterleiten
- Pölching
- Reichenau
- Sachrang
- Schlechtenberg
- Schoßrinn
- Schwarzenstein
- Schweibern
- Seehaus
- Spöck
- Staffelstein
- Stein
- Vordergschwendt
- Wald
- Wasserthal
- Weiher

== Transport ==
Aschau im Chiemgau station is part of the Chiemgau Railway.

== Notable people ==
- Hans Clarin (1929-2005), actor and synchronist
- Christian Wolff (born 1938), actor
- Franz Halder, Chief of the General Staff of the German Army High Command, died here in 1972
- Peter Michael Hamel (born 1947), composer, founded the intercultural music institute in Aschau in 1998
- Kurt Zeitzler, chief of the General Army Staff of the Wehrmacht, died here in 1963

== Gallery ==
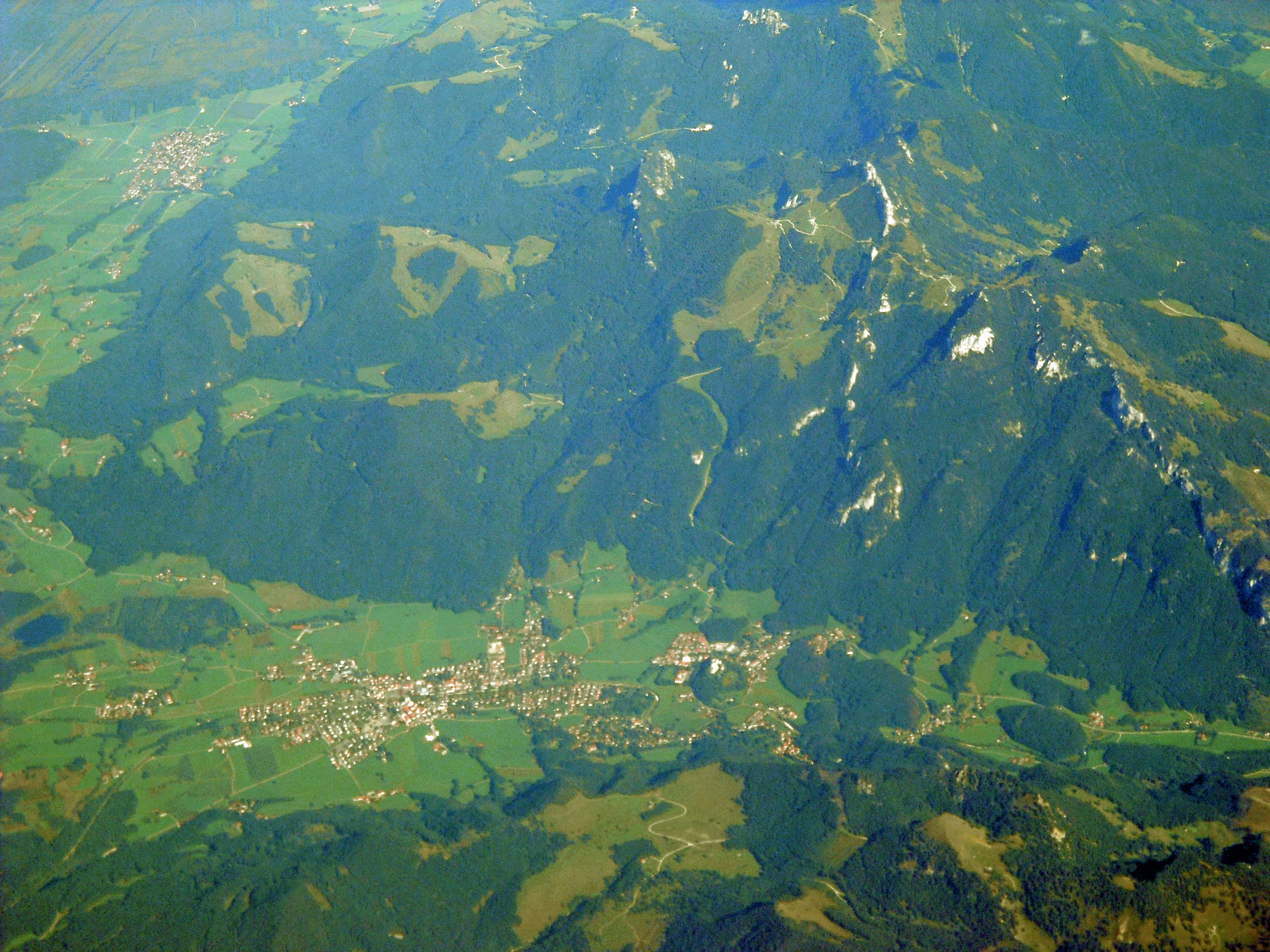
Aschau im Chiemgau Ort

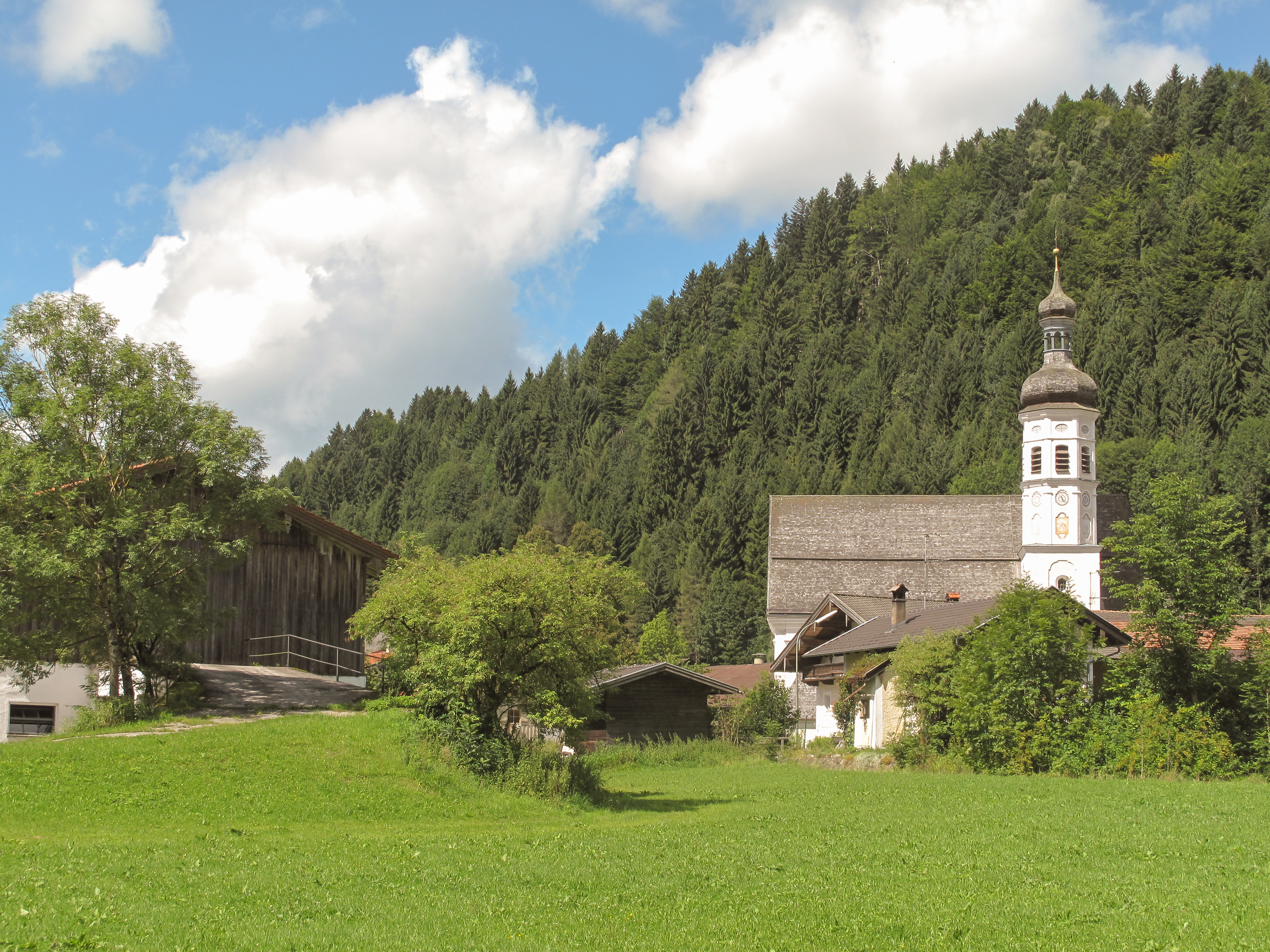
Sachrang, church Sankt Michael

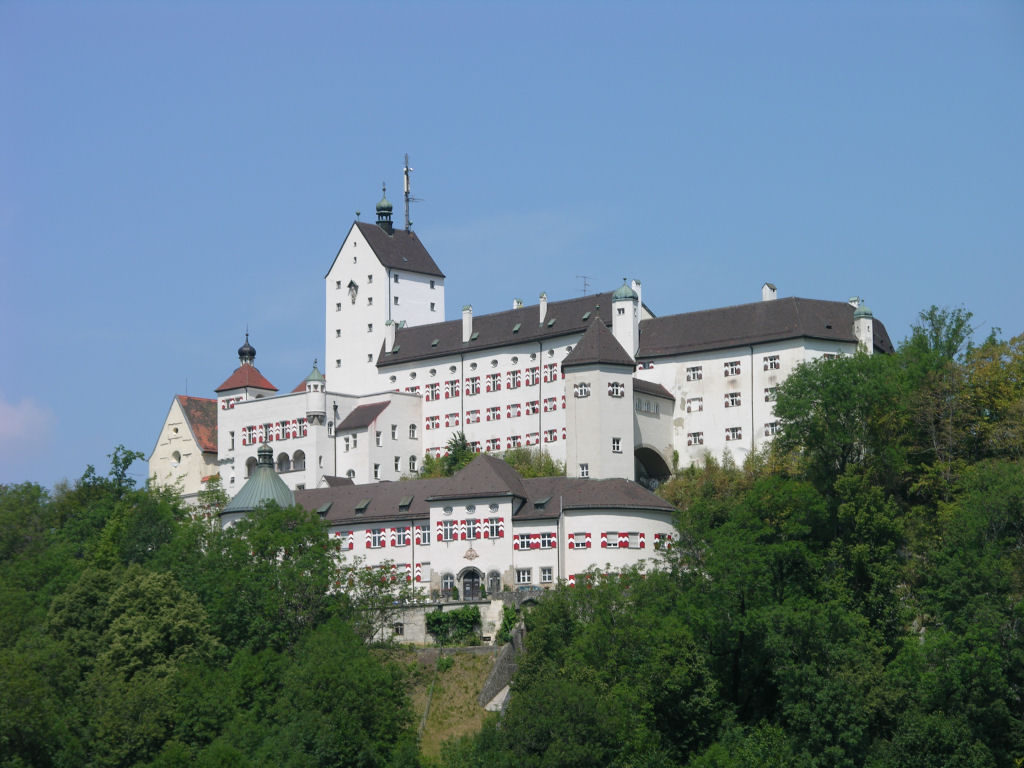
Schloss Hohenaschau
