= Woyzeck (1979 film) =

1979 film

- DVD cover
- Directed by: Werner Herzog
- Written by: Werner Herzog
- Based on: Woyzeck by Georg Büchner
- Produced by: Werner Herzog
- Starring: Klaus Kinski; Eva Mattes; Wolfgang Reichmann; Willy Semmelrogge
- Cinematography: Jörg Schmidt-Reitwein
- Edited by: Beate Mainka-Jellinghaus
- Production companies: Werner Herzog Filmproduktion; Zweites Deutsches Fernsehen (ZDF)
- Distributed by: Werner Herzog Filmproduktion
- Release dates: 22 May 1979 (Cannes); 25 May 1979
- Running time: 82 minutes
- Country: West Germany
- Language: German
- Budget: DEM 900,000

Woyzeck [ˈvɔʏtsɛk] is a 1979 West German drama film written, produced and directed by Werner Herzog, and starring Klaus Kinski and Eva Mattes. It is an adaptation of German dramatist Georg Büchner's unfinished play of the same name.

== Plot synopsis ==
Franz Woyzeck, a lowly soldier stationed in a mid-nineteenth century provincial German town, is the father of an illegitimate child by his mistress Marie. Woyzeck earns extra money for his family by performing menial jobs for the Captain and agreeing to take part in medical experiments conducted by the Doctor. As one of these experiments, the Doctor tells Woyzeck he must eat nothing but peas. Woyzeck's mental health is breaking down and he begins to experience a series of apocalyptic visions. Meanwhile, Marie grows tired of Woyzeck and turns her attentions to a handsome drum major who, in an ambiguous scene taking place in Marie's bedroom, sleeps with her.

After some time, and with his jealous suspicions growing, Woyzeck confronts the drum major, who beats him up and humiliates him. Finally, on the verge of mental breakdown, Woyzeck stabs Marie to death by a pond. Woyzeck disposes of the knife in the pond, and while trying to wash the blood off, he hallucinates that he is swimming in blood and apparently drowns himself and dies. While recovering the corpses, the townspeople relish the fact that "a real murder" has taken place, distracting everyone from their mind-numbingly boring lives.

== Cast ==
- Klaus Kinski as Friedrich Johann Franz Woyzeck
- Eva Mattes as Marie
- Wolfgang Reichmann as Captain
- Willy Semmelrogge as Doctor
- Josef Bierbichler as Drum Major
- Paul Burian as Andres
- Volker Prechtel as Journeyman
- Dieter Augustin as Market Crier
- Irm Hermann as Margret
- Wolfgang Bächler as Jew

== Production ==
Filming for Woyzeck in Telč, Czechoslovakia, began just five days after work on Herzog's Nosferatu the Vampyre had ended. Herzog used the same exhausted crew and star. The scenes were accomplished mostly in a single take, which allowed filming to be completed in only 18 days; it was edited in just four. Herzog had planned to use Bruno S. in the title role, but he then changed his mind, considering Kinski more suitable for the part. To compensate Bruno for this disappointment, Herzog wrote the leading role in the film Stroszek especially for him.

At the 1979 Cannes Film Festival, Eva Mattes won the award for Best Supporting Actress for her part in this film. Herzog was nominated for the Golden Palm. In 1981, the film won the Silver Guild Film Award from the Guild of German Art House Cinemas.

== Reception ==
Woyzeck has an 86% rating on Rotten Tomatoes with an average rating of 7.3/10 based on 14 reviews. In an episode of Sneak Previews, both Roger Ebert and Gene Siskel recommended the film.

== Soundtrack ==
- The music during the opening scene before the credits is Beethoven Piano Sonata Op. 81a, Second Movement ("Abwesenheit" or "Absence") performed on a celeste.
- The opening credits strings music is performed by Fidelquartett Telč, who also perform live during the movie. The performance seems to have been created for the movie since no further reference is available.
- The last song of the closing credits is the second movement (largo) of Antonio Vivaldi's concerto for lute and two violins in D major (RV93), played with the guitar.
