= Heart of Glass (film) =

1976 film

- DVD cover for the film
- Directed by: Werner Herzog
- Written by: Werner Herzog; Herbert Achternbusch
- Produced by: Werner Herzog
- Starring: Josef Bierbichler; Stefan Güttler; Clemens Scheitz; Sonja Skiba
- Cinematography: Jörg Schmidt-Reitwein
- Edited by: Beate Mainka-Jellinghaus
- Music by: Popol Vuh
- Production company: Werner Herzog Filmproduktion
- Distributed by: Werner Herzog Filmproduktion
- Release dates: 1 December 1976 (London Film Festival); 17 December 1976 (West Germany)
- Running time: 94 minutes
- Country: West Germany
- Language: German

Heart of Glass (German: Herz aus Glas) is a 1976 German film directed and produced by Werner Herzog, set in 18th century Bavaria. The film was written by Herzog, based partly on a story by Herbert Achternbusch. The main character is Hias, based on the legendary Bavarian prophet Mühlhiasl.

== Plot ==
The setting is an 18th-century Bavarian town with a glassblowing factory that produces a brilliant ruby glass. When the master glass blower dies, the secret of producing it is lost. The local Baron, who owns the factory, is obsessed with the ruby glass and believes it to have magical properties. With the loss of the secret, he descends into madness along with the rest of the townspeople. The main character is Hias, a seer from the hills, who predicts the destruction of the factory in a fire.

== Production ==
During shooting, almost all of the actors performed while under hypnosis. Every actor in every scene was hypnotized, with the exception of the character Hias and the professional glassblowers who appear in the film. The hypnotized actors give very strange performances, which Herzog intended to suggest the trance-like state of the townspeople in the story. Herzog provided the actors with most of their dialogue, memorised during hypnosis. However, many of the hypnotised actors' gestures and movements occurred spontaneously during filming.

The majority of the film was shot in Bavaria, just a few miles from where Herzog was raised in the remote village of Sachrang (nestled in the Chiemgau Alps), and also at a nearby village in Switzerland. Other brief shots of landscape scenes were filmed in various locations around the world that Herzog scouted out, including Yellowstone National Park and the Viamala canyon. The conclusion of the film was shot on the Skellig Islands.

Herzog, along with other members of the crew, has a cameo as one of the men carrying a load of ruby glass to the lake.

== Release ==
The film was screened at the London Film Festival on 1 and 2 December 1976.

== Reception ==
On the review aggregator website Rotten Tomatoes, 93% of 14 critics' reviews are positive.

== Bibliography ==
- "Heart of Glass" (Skellig Edition, 1976) by Alan Greenberg, including the screenplay by Herzog. English adaptation by Greenberg, with black and white photos also by him.
