= Every Man for Himself and God Against All: A Memoir =

2022 memoir by Werner Herzog

Every Man for Himself and God Against All
- First edition cover
- Author: Werner Herzog
- Original title: Jeder für sich und Gott gegen alle
- Translator: Michael Hofmann
- Language: German
- Genre: Memoir
- Publisher: Carl Hanser Verlag
- Publication date: 22 August 2022
- Publication place: Germany
- English publication date: 10 October 2023
- Pages: 352
- ISBN: 978-3-446-27399-3

Every Man for Himself and God Against All: A Memoir (German: Jeder für sich und Gott gegen alle. Erinnerungen) is a 2022 memoir by the German filmmaker Werner Herzog.

== Summary ==
Werner Herzog reminisces about his life interspersed with stories about his films, mixing memories and personal stories from different times. His memories from his childhood in rural Bavaria are accompanied by the making of the science fiction film The Wild Blue Yonder (2005). His early interest in ski jumping led to the making of a film about the sport. Herzog writes about his acquaintance with the actor Klaus Kinski in Munich. He writes about his temporary adherence to Catholicism and how it probably left traces in his films. He writes about how recurring tropes in his films are connected to personal experiences. The book ends in the middle of a sentence.

== Reception ==
Kirkus Reviews described the book as "Herzog in all his extravagant, perspicacious glory" and an "opportunity to delve deeply into Herzog's fascinating mind".

Claire Dederer of The Guardian wrote that admirers of Herzog "will find much to love here, all of it jumbled up into a kind of memoir-diary-polemic hybrid". She called the book "something weirder and truer than a mere autobiography" that reaches Herzog's "deepest compulsions and yearnings".

Dwight Garner of The New York Times did not think the book is meant to be taken at face value, relating its content to the "ecstatic truth" Herzog says he strives for in his documentary films. Garner wrote he did not believe a word in the book and called Herzog "an old-school, concierge-level bluffer".

== See also ==
- The Enigma of Kaspar Hauser, a 1974 film by Herzog, originally released in German as Jeder für sich und Gott gegen alle.
