= Małgorzata Gebel =

Polish actress (born 1955)

- Born: 30 November 1955 (age 70); Stalinogród, Polish People's Republic
- Occupation: Actress
- Years active: 1980–1996

Małgorzata Gebel (born 30 November 1955) is a retired Polish actress. She is best known for her performance as Wiktoria Klonowska in Schindler's List and as Dr. Bogdana 'Bob' Livetsky Romansky in ER.

In 1980, she graduated from the Aleksander Zelwerowicz National Academy of Dramatic Art in Warsaw.

== Filmography ==
- Przed maturą (1981) - Marta Macewicz
- Angry Harvest (1985) - Frau Rubin
- Rosa Luxemburg (1986)
- The Microscope (1988) - Tina
- Judgment in Berlin (1988) - Beata Levandovska
- Land der Väter, Land der Söhne (1988) - Klaudia
- Murderous Decisions (1991) - Maria
- Schindler's List (1993) - Wiktoria Klonowska
- Transatlantis (1995) - Solveig
- ER (1994–1995) - ER aide (Dr.) Bogdana "Bob" Livetsky Romansky
