= Eva Mattes =

German-Austrian actress

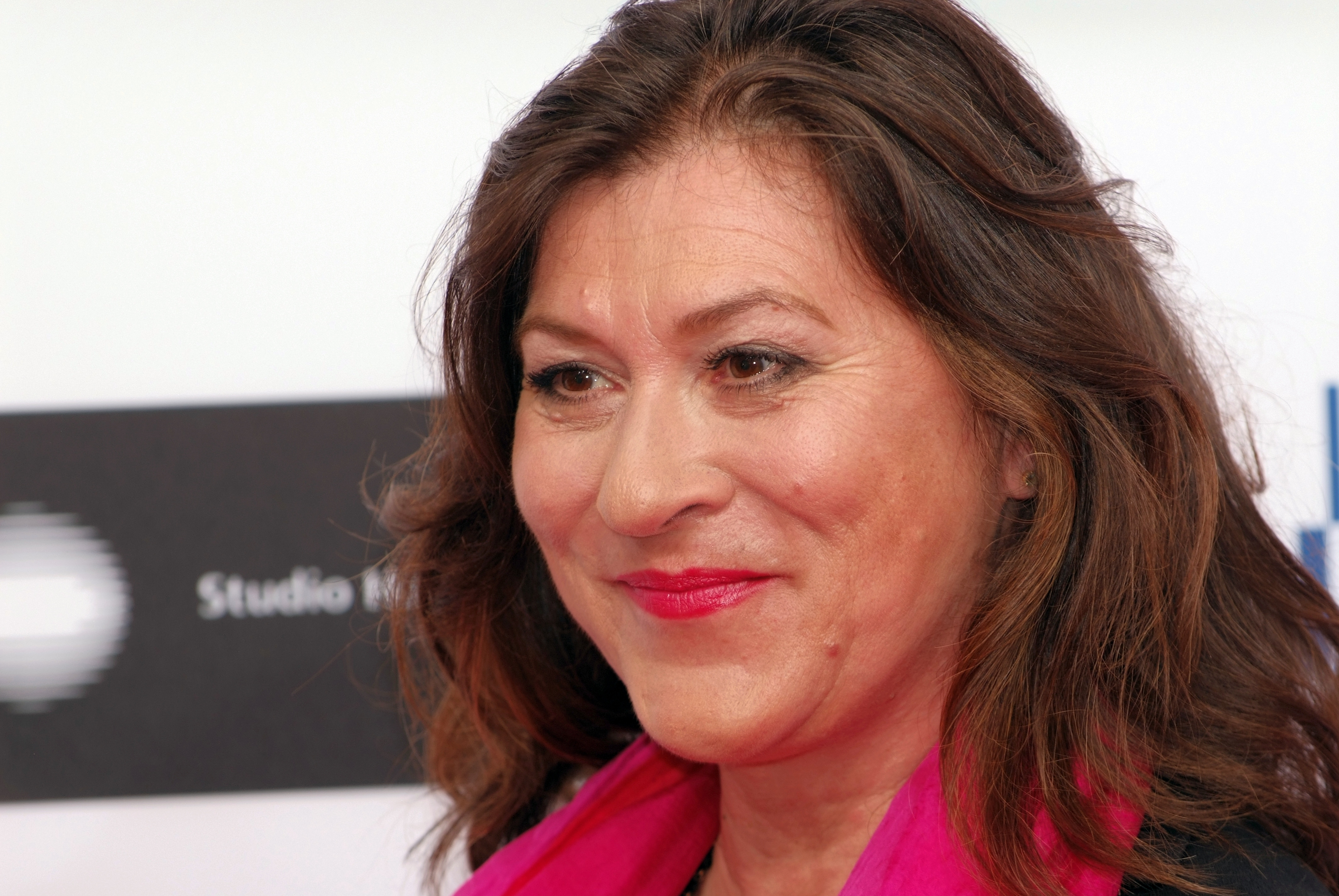
- Eva Mattes, 2012
- Born: 14 December 1954 (age 71); Tegernsee, West Germany
- Occupation: Actress

Eva Mattes (German: [ˈeː.fa ˈma.təs]; born 14 December 1954) is a German-Austrian actress. She has appeared in four films directed by director Rainer Werner Fassbinder (The Bitter Tears of Petra von Kant, Jail Bait, Effi Briest and In a Year of 13 Moons). In A Man Like E.V.A. (1984), she played a bearded film director, based on the recently deceased Fassbinder.

She has also appeared in two films of Werner Herzog, with whom she was in a relationship. Mattes also appeared in Germany, Pale Mother, and in Enemy at the Gates as the mother of Sasha Filippov. On television, she has played Klara Blum in the police procedural series Tatort.

Her parents were the composer Willy Mattes and actress Margit Symo. Mattes lives in Berlin with Austrian artist Wolfgang Georgsdorf and two children.

== Awards ==
- 1981 Bavarian Film Awards, Best Actress
- 1979 Cannes Film Festival, Jury's Special Grand Prix

== Selected filmography ==
Year	Title	Role	Director	Notes
1970	o.k.	Phan Ti Mao	Michael Verhoeven	
1970	Mathias Kneissl	Katharina Kneissl	Reinhard Hauff	
1972	The Bitter Tears of Petra von Kant	Gabriele von Kant	Rainer Werner Fassbinder	
1972	Jail Bait	Hanni	Rainer Werner Fassbinder	TV film
1972	Desaster	Rosi	Reinhard Hauff	TV film
1974	Supermarket	Monika	Roland Klick	
1974	Effi Briest	Hulda	Rainer Werner Fassbinder	
1976	Naked Massacre	Catherine	Denis Héroux	
1977	Stroszek	Eva	Werner Herzog	
1978	In a Year of 13 Moons	Marie-Ann Weishaupt	Rainer Werner Fassbinder	
1979	David	Toni	Peter Lilienthal	
1979	Union der festen Hand	Paula Griguszies	Claus Peter Witt	TV film
1979	Woyzeck	Marie	Werner Herzog	
1980	Germany, Pale Mother	Lene	Helma Sanders-Brahms	
1980	Céleste	Céleste Albaret	Percy Adlon	
1984	A Man Like E.V.A.	E.V.A. (based on Rainer Werner Fassbinder)	Radu Gabrea	
1986	Now or Never	Mo	Christel Buschmann	
1988	Felix	Eva	Margarethe von Trotta	Anthology film. Segment "Eva"
1993	The Movie Teller	Marga Fritsche	Bernhard Sinkel	
1997	The Cry of Love	Simone Behrend	Matti Geschonneck	TV film
1998	Widows – Erst die Ehe, dann das Vergnügen	Molly Dollinger	Sherry Hormann	
2001	Enemy at the Gates	Mother Filippova	Jean-Jacques Annaud	
2001	Goebbels und Geduldig	Magda Goebbels	Kai Wessel	TV film
2002–15	Tatort	Hauptkommissarin Klara Blum		TV series (28 episodes)
2014	Fever	Franziska	Elfi Mikesch	
