= Herbert Knaup =

German actor

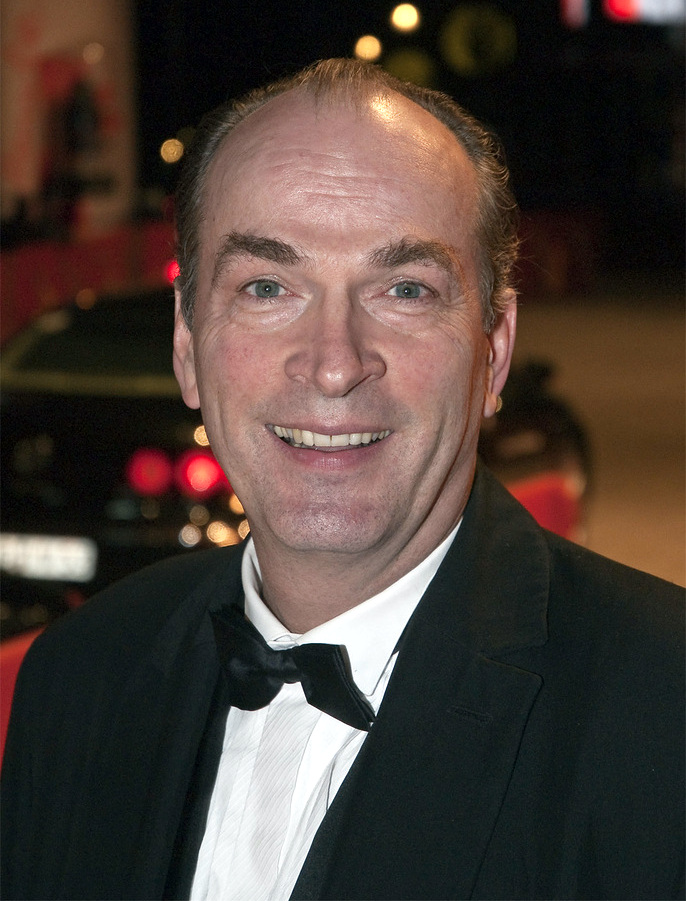
- in 2009
- Born: 23 March 1956 (age 69); Sonthofen, Bavaria, West Germany
- Occupation: Actor
- Years active: 1978–present

Herbert Knaup (born 23 March 1956) is a German film and television actor. He is perhaps best-known to international audiences for his supporting roles in Run Lola Run (1998) and The Lives of Others (2006).

== Selected filmography ==
- Coda (1978, Short)
- Jaipur Junction (1982) .... Tommy
- Waller's Last Trip (1989) .... Waller (jung)
- The Invincibles (1994) .... Karl Simon
- The Little Innocent (1994, TV film) .... Paul Hansen
- Brother of Sleep (1995) .... Cantor Goller / Choirmaster Goller
- Magic Girl (1995, TV film) .... Horst
- Warshots (1996) .... Jan Loy
- Father's Day (1996) .... Thomas
- Cologne's Finest (1997, TV film) .... Kamphausen
- Run Lola Run (1998) .... Vater
- Blind Date - Flirt mit Folgen (1998) .... Markus
- Jimmy the Kid (1998) .... Dortmunder
- Fever (1998) .... Doermer
- Die Braut (1999) .... Johann Wolfgang von Goethe
- Our Island in the South Pacific (1999) .... Albert
- 'Ne günstige Gelegenheit (1999) .... Lorenz Kellermann
- Ordinary Decent Criminal (2000) .... De Heer
- Marlene (2000) .... Rudolf Sieber
- Nuremberg (2000, TV Mini-Series) .... Albert Speer
- Anna's Summer (2001) .... Max Feldmann
- Nowhere in Africa (2001) .... Walter Redlich (voice)
- Deseo (2002) .... Bremen
- Ganz und gar (2003) .... Manfred
- Anatomy 2 (2003) .... Prof. Charles Müller-LaRousse
- Distant Lights (2003) .... Klaus Fengler
- Angst (2003) .... Wolfgang
- Hamlet_X (2003) .... Laertes
- Prince Charming (2003, TV film) .... Sven Maibach
- Agnes and His Brothers (2004) .... Werner Tschirner
- Rock Crystal (2004) .... Paul
- Atomised (2006) .... Sollers
- The Lives of Others (2006) .... Gregor Hessenstein
- Der Untergang der Pamir (2006, TV film) .... Kapitän Ludwig Lewerenz
- Crusade in Jeans (2006) .... Carlo Bennatti
- Du bist nicht allein (2007) .... Kurt Wellinek
- Day of Disaster (2007, TV film) .... Martin Feldmann
- Special Escort (2007) .... Giselher
- The Legend of Brandner Kaspar (2008) .... Erzengel Michael
- This Is Love (2009) .... Dominik
- Sisi (2009, TV Movie) .... Herzog Max
- Kluftinger (2009–2016, TV series, 5 episodes) .... Kluftinger
- Jerry Cotton (2010) .... Mr. High
- Bon Appétit (2010) .... Thomas
- Eichmann's End: Love, Betrayal, Death (2010, TV film) .... Adolf Eichmann
- No More Mr. Ice Guy (2011) .... Rainer Berg
- In Darkness (2011) .... Ignacy Chiger
- The Man with the Bassoon (2011, TV Movie) .... Erwin Bockelmann
- Hotel Desire (2011, Short) .... Hoteldirektor
- Homecoming (2012, TV Movie) .... Bürgermeister
- Schutzengel (2012) .... Henri Brietner
- Move (2012) .... Vater Dina
- Mittlere Reife (2012, TV Movie) .... Oliver Seifert
- Das Kleine Gespenst (2013) .... Uhrmachermeister Zifferle
- Therapy Crashers (2014) .... Georg Trautmann
- Master of Death (2015, TV film) .... Moritz Hollstein
- Die Kanzlei (since 2015, TV series, 62 episodes) .... Markus Gellert
- The Last Pig (2016) .... Narrator
- Eine Hochzeit platzt selten allein (2019) .... Oliver Wackernagel
- Just Something Nice (2022) .... Robert
