= Walter Saxer =

Swiss film producer

- Born: 1947 (age 78–79)
- Occupations: film producer; screenwriter; film director
- Notable work: Fitzcarraldo; Sepa: Nuestro Señor de los milagros (1987)

Walter Saxer (born 1947) is a Swiss film producer, production manager, screenwriter, and film director, born in 1947 in St. Gallen.

At the age of 20, Walter Saxer met Werner Herzog and became a unit production manager in Herzog's debut Even Dwarfs Started Small. A long-time collaborator, in the following years Saxer produced Herzog's Aguirre, the Wrath of God (1972), The Enigma of Kaspar Hauser (1974), Stroszek (1977), and Nosferatu the Vampyre (1979). Saxer's credits as producer include more than 22 films, he also wrote the script of the Scream of Stone. His most known project is Fitzcarraldo, a film that is considered one of the most difficult productions in the history of cinema.

Saxer's sole work as director is a 1987 documentary Sepa: Nuestro Señor de los milagros. The film tells the story of Sepa, an experimental open-air penal prison established in 1951 by the Peruvian government as part of a programme to colonize the Amazon. The colony was situated on a 37,000 ha territory in the wild Peruvian jungle where the convicted had to establish their settlement and survive on their own. Referred to as ‘green hell’ by former inhabitants, in Sepa the prisoners were allowed to be joined by their families and were often on good terms with the guardians. Sepa was shut down in the early 1990s and left almost no traces, Saxer's film became the sole audiovisual evidence of its existence. The story is narrated by Mario Vargas Llosa. The film was shown only once on Swiss TV in the 1980s. Decades later, the restored version of Sepa: Nuestro Señor de los milagros premiered in Spain during the 2021 Play-Doc film festival in Tui, Galicia.

In the mid 90's Saxer moved to the city of Iquitos, where he dedicated himself to managing a small hotel called La Casa Fitzcarraldo.
