= Mühlhiasl =

Bavarian prophet (1753-1805)

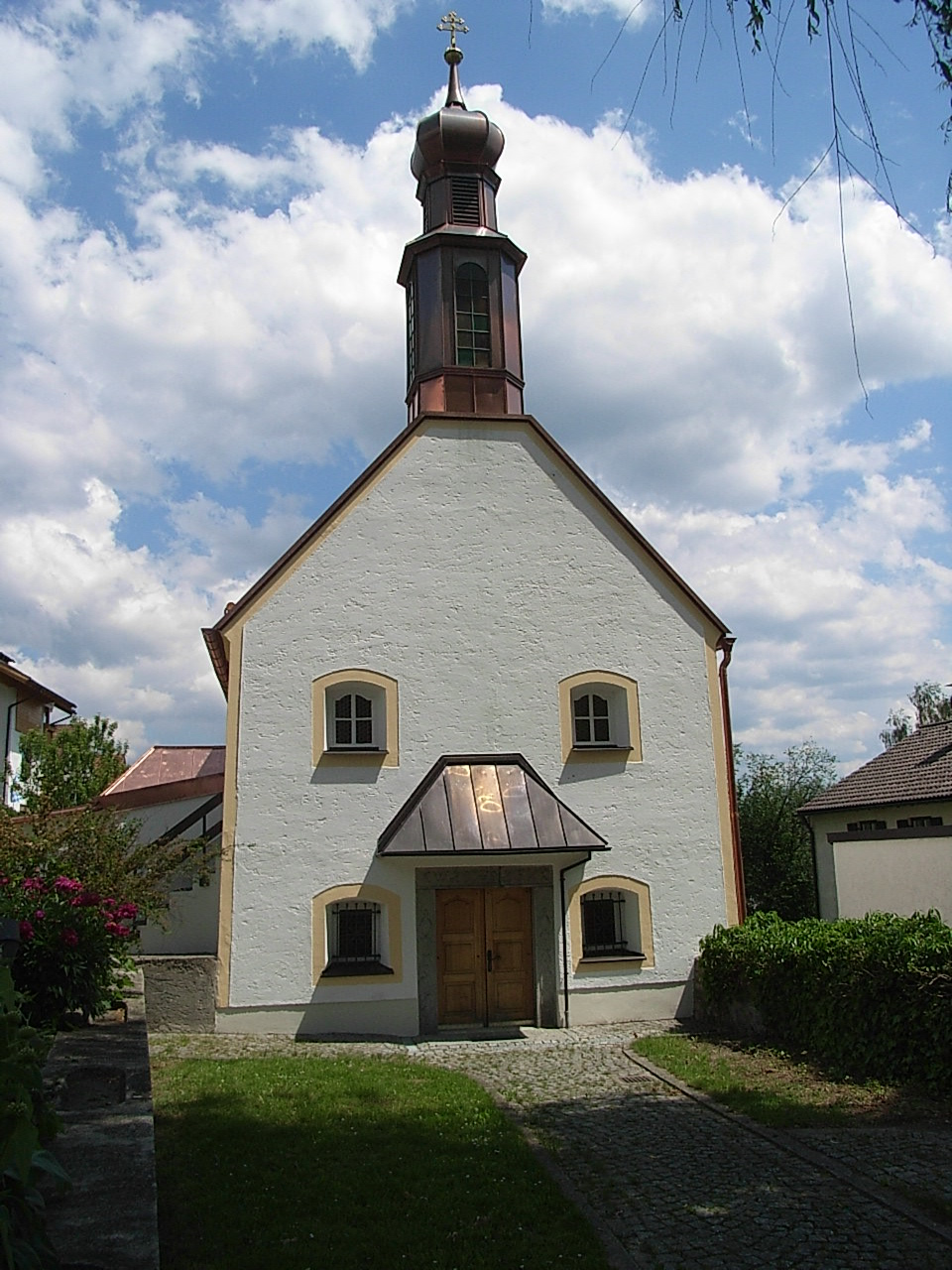
Rabenstein, Bavaria

Mühlhiasl (or Muehlhiasl) of Apoig (September 16, 1753 – 1805 in Zwiesel) was a Bavarian prophet. Historians are uncertain as to whether Mühlhiasl and the legendary Bavarian cowherd and seer Matthias Stormberger (b. 1753) are actually the same. Stormberger was a German peasant mystic and charcoal burner who lived in Bavaria and made prophecies about the towns and villages where he lived. He made reference to the future in descriptions of the Deggendorf–Kalteneck railway that would be built through the forest where he lived between Kalenneck and Deggendorf.

== Cultural references ==
The character Mühlhiasl was the subject of a film by the film director Werner Herzog adapted from a story by Herbert Achternbusch. The film Herz aus Glas (1976) tells the story of a bankrupt glass works in a small village in Bavaria. The main character based on Mühlhiasl is called "Hias".
