= Waller's Last Trip =

1989 film

- Directed by: Christian Wagner
- Based on: Die Strecke by Gerhard Köpf
- Starring: Rolf Illig; Volker Prechtel; Herbert Knaup
- Release date: 13 April 1989
- Running time: 95 minutes
- Country: West Germany
- Language: German

Waller's Last Trip (German: Wallers letzter Gang) is a 1989 West German drama film directed by Christian Wagner.

== Synopsis ==
An old platelayer (trackman) inspects his stretch of railway track for the last time.

== Cast ==
- Rolf Illig – Waller (old)
- Volker Prechtel – Karg
- Herbert Knaup – Waller (young)
- Crescentia Dünßer – Angelika Heindl
- Sibylle Canonica – Rosina
- Rainer Egger – Albin
- Irm Hermann – Ordensschwester
