= Transatlantis =

1995 film

- Film poster
- Directed by: Christian Wagner
- Written by: Christian Wagner
- Produced by: Christian Wagner
- Starring: Daniel Olbrychski
- Cinematography: Thomas Mauch
- Release date: February 1995
- Running time: 116 minutes
- Country: Germany
- Language: German

Transatlantis is a 1995 German drama film directed by Christian Wagner. It was entered into the 45th Berlin International Film Festival.

== Cast ==
- Daniel Olbrychski as Neuffer
- Birgit Aurell as Nele
- Jörg Hube as Brack
- Malgorzata Gebel as Solveig
- Otto Grünmandl as Rubacher
- Rolf Illig as Dr. Hilbig
- Hubert Mulzer as Gäbeles Hans
- Guenter Burger as Branko Ristic
- Michael Wogh as Herburger
- Karl Knaup as Weininger (as Karl-Heinz Knaup)
- Harry Meacher as Peary
