= Warchild (film) =

- Directed by: Christian Wagner
- Screenplay by: Edin H.-Hadzimahovic
- Produced by: Christian Wagner
- Music by: Konstantia Gourzi, Xaver Naudascher
- Release date: November 9, 2006
- Running time: 1h 43m
- Country: Germany
- Language: German

Warchild or Stille Sehnsucht is a 2006 film directed by Christian Wagner. It tells the story of a Bosnian woman, Senada, who is determined to find her daughter, who was taken into other people's care during the Bosnian War and ended up in Germany. Warchild was filmed in a number of locations in Germany, Bosnia-Herzegovina, and Slovenia. The film is in German and Bosnian. It won two awards and was nominated for a further two.

== Plot ==
Labina Mitevska stars as Senada, a young mother whose only daughter Aida was removed from Bosnia-Herzegovina during the worst years of the war and presumably adopted into a Western European family. Searching for her after the war, Senada enters illegally into Germany, where she discovers through a social worker the harsh truth of postwar adoption: Aida is alive and well and living happily with a German family. Dark secrets emerge, leaving no one unscathed in this expertly crafted, superbly performed drama.

== The theme of war ==
Warchild is set against the background of the Bosnian War. However, Wagner (Wallers last Trip/Transatlantis/Ghetto Kids) wanted to tell a universally recognisable story that would bring home to viewers the impact of war on ordinary people's lives. It is a story about a mother's search for her child after the war but it is also a story about dislocation, as adults and children everywhere face the consequences of separation, relocation and migration.

== Balkan Blues Trilogy ==
Warchild belongs to German filmmaker Christian Wagner's Balkan Blues Trilogy, which begins with a short film, Zita, and continues with Alcatrash, currently in production. The three films are connected to the Balkans and reflect Wagner's interest in the movement of peoples throughout Europe.

== Awards and Screenings ==
Warchild is the second installment of Wagner's Balkan Blues Trilogy. It features Labina Mitevska (Before the Rain) and Katrin Sass (Good Bye, Lenin!). It had its international premiere at the 2006 Montreal World Film Festival. It won the award for best screenplay.

Warchild has won a number of other awards, including the Bavarian Film Awards (Special Jury Prize), Best Screenplay Montreal 2006, Audience Award Portoroz, and the Golden Olive Tree & Special Audience Award 2007 at the Lecce European Film Festival.

Shown at about 50 international film festivals, the film is a German and Slovenian co-production by Wagnerfilm, Munich and Studio Maj, Ljubljana. It was funded by MFG/FilmFernsehFonds Bayern/BKM/Filski Sklad Slovenia/EURIMAGES.
