= Bruno S. =

German actor and musician

Bruno Schleinstein
- Born: 2 June 1932
- Died: 11 August 2010 (aged 78)
- Other name: Bruno S.
- Occupations: Actor, painter, musician
- Years active: 1974–1977

Bruno Schleinstein (2 June 1932 – 11 August 2010), often credited as Bruno S., was a German film actor, artist, and musician. He is known internationally for his roles in two films directed by Werner Herzog, The Enigma of Kaspar Hauser (1974) and Stroszek (1976).

== Life ==
Schleinstein was often beaten as a child, and spent much of his youth in mental institutions. He was a largely self-taught musician, who over the years developed considerable skill on the piano, accordion, glockenspiel and handbells. He was known for playing in back gardens performing 18th- and 19th-century-style ballads on weekends, while sustaining himself financially working as a forklift driver at a car plant. Schleinstein said he transmitted (German: durchgeben) his songs, rather than singing them.

Schleinstein was featured in a documentary, Bruno der Schwarze – Es blies ein Jäger wohl in sein Horn (1970). When Werner Herzog saw the film, he promptly cast Schleinstein (under the name Bruno S.) as his lead actor in The Enigma of Kaspar Hauser (1974), though he had no acting experience, and the historical figure he portrayed was only in his teens. Richard Eder wrote in his review of the film, "None of it would work without a believable figure in the role. ... It is an extraordinary fit. Bruno, with his strength and vulnerability, with his head tilted back and his eyes opened wide as if to receive every signal coming in, with his gift for the unexpected gesture, not only inhabits the role but seems to have fathered it."

Schleinstein subsequently starred in Stroszek (1977), which Herzog wrote especially for him. Stroszek has a number of biographical details from Schleinstein's life, including the use of his own flat as the home of Bruno Stroszek. He also played his own instruments.

Herzog has claimed that Schleinstein was deeply suspicious of the director, and nervous about performing in front of the cameras — so he had to be "listened to" for several hours on set in order to build his self-esteem. Schleinstein enjoyed his brief period of fame in Berlin following the release of these films, but said later that "Everybody threw him away." Instead, he took up painting and music. Schleinstein appeared in Jan Ralske's short documentary film Vergangen, vergessen, vorüber (lit. Long-lost and Lay Me Down, 1993), which is a film about Berlin made a few years after the fall of the Berlin Wall separating the eastern and western parts of the city. Much later, Ralske also made a short documentary about Schleinstein and his art, called Seeing Things (2009). Some of his artwork was shown at the 2004 Outsider Art Fair in New York City.

Schleinstein was mentioned in Elliott Smith's album Figure 8 released in 2000. A fan of Herzog and Schleinstein, Smith said in an interview with Revolver, "How come we have no Bruno S. [in America]? How come he can be a film star in Europe, but over here everybody has to look like they were computer-generated?"

He was the subject of a 2003 documentary, Bruno S. – Estrangement is Death (German title: Bruno S. - Die Fremde ist der Tod), directed by Miron Zownir. A companion book was published in the same year.

In March 2014, Parte released an album of Bruno S's music; the recordings were made shortly before his death in Berlin. He was a member of the NO!Art movement.

Schleinstein died on 11 August 2010 after suffering heart problems. Shortly after his death, Werner Herzog remarked, "In all my films, and with all the great actors with whom I have worked, he was the best. There is no one who comes close to him. I mean, in his humanity, and the depth of his performance, there is no one like him."

== Further resources ==
- Bergan, Ronald (22 August 2010). "Bruno Schleinstein obituary". The Guardian.
- Schleinstein, Bruno. Mamatschi. The New York Times. Berlin. Archived from the original on 22 July 2011.
  - Fenner, Ingrid (24 December 2008). "A Translation of 'Mamatschi'". The New York Times.
