= K. Leimer =

Kerry Leimer
- Born: July 28, 1954 (age 71); Winnipeg, Manitoba, Canada
- Years active: 1970–1983; 2002–present
- Labels: Palace of Lights; RVNG Intl.

Kerry Leimer, known as K. Leimer professionally, is an American electronic musician based in Seattle, Washington. He is a founding member of the record label Palace of Lights, which formed in 1979. Known for a more solitary practice, Leimer rarely performed live. The moniker, "K." is a reference to Kafka's reclusive character, Josef K (who appears in both The Trial and The Castle)." Active since the 1970s, Leimer primarily self-released his music for several decades, gaining an underground following. His music has seen a resurgence in popularity after much of his catalog was reissued by New York Based label RVNG Intl. in the 2010s.

== Biography ==
Leimer was born in Winnipeg, Manitoba. His family moved to Chicago in his childhood. The family moved again to Seattle in 1967, where he began making experimental music using inexpensive instruments and magnetic tape manipulation. He released some material on Robert Carlberg's Anode Productions before starting the label Palace of Lights with his spouse Dorothy Cross in 1979. After 1983, he ceased producing music for many years, returning in 2002 to reissue old work and release new material. In 2014, RVNG compiled the first of several reissue packages of his work, A Period of Review. From this time forward, Leimer made new material as well, both solo and in collaboration.

== Significant Works ==
- The Soundtrack for Land of Look Behind (1982)
- Mitteltöner (2018), his first vinyl release after 25 years
- Irrational Overcast (2019), on First Terrace Records
