= Willy Semmelrogge =

German actor (1923–1984)

- Born: 15 March 1923; Berlin, Germany
- Died: 10 April 1984 (aged 61); West Berlin, West Germany
- Occupation: Actor
- Years active: 1957–1984

Willy Semmelrogge (15 March 1923 – 10 April 1984) was a German actor. He appeared in 65 films and television shows between 1957 and 1984.

== Partial filmography ==
- People in the Net (1959), as Lauer
- Manhattan Night of Murder (1965), as Doc
- Fast ein Held (1967)
- A Premeditated Crime (1967, TV film), as Untersuchungsrichter
- Der Griller (1968), as Inspektor Kristlieb
- Liebe und so weiter (1968), as Monk
- Die Sonne angreifen (1971, TV film), as Friedrich
- Oh Jonathan – oh Jonathan! (1973), as 1. Museumsbeamter (uncredited)
- Ein für allemal (1973, TV film), as Lokführer
- The Enigma of Kaspar Hauser (1974), as Circus director
- Tatort (1974–1980, TV series, 22 episodes), as Kriminalhauptmeister Willi Kreutzer
- The Garbage Dump (1975, TV film), as Herr Heinrich
- Die Affäre Lerouge (1976, TV film), as Lebrun
- Woyzeck (1979), as Doctor
- Auf Achse: Die thessalische Nacht (1980, TV series episode), as Otto
- Derrick: Prozente (1981, TV series episode), as Herr Mahler
