= Scream of Stone =

1991 film by Werner Herzog

- Directed by: Werner Herzog
- Written by: Hans-Ulrich Klenner; Walter Saxer; Robert Geoffrion
- Produced by: Walter Saxer; Henri Lange; Richard Sadler
- Starring: Vittorio Mezzogiorno; Stefan Glowacz; Mathilda May; Donald Sutherland; Brad Dourif; Al Waxman; Chavela Vargas; Hans Kammerlander; Volker Prechtel
- Cinematography: Rainer Klausmann
- Edited by: Suzanne Baron
- Release date: 1991
- Running time: 105 minutes
- Countries: Germany; France; Canada
- Language: English

Scream of Stone (German: Cerro Torre: Schrei aus Stein) is a 1991 film directed by Werner Herzog about a climbing expedition on Cerro Torre. The film was shot on location at Cerro Torre, with several scenes filmed close to the summit.

== Plot ==
Two champion climbers, young Martin and experienced Roger, compete to be the first to conquer a daunting snow-covered peak.

== Production ==
The film is based on the history of the supposed first conquest of the summit of Cerro Torre in 1959, by the Italian climber Cesare Maestri and his partner, the Austrian Toni Egger, who died during the descent. Cerro Torre is known as one of the most difficult climbs in the world due to difficult weather conditions and lack of a clear ascent route. Maestri's claim was later challenged as he failed to give substantial proofs on reaching the summit.

The script was written principally by longtime Herzog production manager Walter Saxer, based on an idea from mountaineer Reinhold Messner, with whom Herzog had worked in his documentary The Dark Glow of the Mountains. Herzog, usually an author of screenplays to his films, believed that the script was weak, especially the dialogue, and even commented that he didn't consider Scream of Stone to be his film. Still, he praised some mountain climbing sequences of the film as "the most impressive thing you can see on screen, much more ... than anything in a Hollywood blockbuster", because Stefan Glowacz climbed the mountain in single takes without safety lines.

== Home media ==
A DVD transfer of Scream of Stone was released in Australia by Payless Entertainment cat. PEL031.

== Sources ==
- Prager, Brad (2011). The Cinema of Werner Herzog: Aesthetic Ecstasy and Truth. New York: Wallflower Press. ISBN 978-0-231-50213-9.
- Cronin, Paul (2014). Werner Herzog – A Guide for the Perplexed: Conversations with Paul Cronin. Faber & Faber. ISBN 978-0-571-25978-6.
- Hegnsvad, Kristoffer (2021). Werner Herzog: Ecstatic Truth and Other Useless Conquests. Reaktion Books. ISBN 978-1-78914-411-6.
