= Fürsteneck witch trial =

The town of Fuersteneck, near Grafenau in Bavaria, Germany, was the location of a witch trial in 1703. A record of the trial was obtained from the parsonage of Röhrnbach.

== Accusation ==
Afra Dickh (also written Afra Dick) was a serving girl at the Frueth farm in Wittersitt, part of the modern-day parish of Ringelai. The accusation made was of poisoning, bedevilment of humans and animals, associating with other witches and dealings with the devil. Co-accused were the 13-year-old shepherdess Maria, who was also in service at the same farm and the widowed farmer Maria Kölbl, a mother of 15 from Neidberg near Ringelai.

== Judgement ==
On account of magic and arson (in puncto veneficii et incendii), Afra Dickh was hanged by executioner Sebastian Fleischmann of Passau on 1 June 1703, at the place of execution in Fürsteneck near Perlesreut, and afterward burnt to ashes at the stake with 30 blocks of wood and 40 pounds of pitch.
