= Sachrang =

- Ortsteil of Aschau im Chiemgau
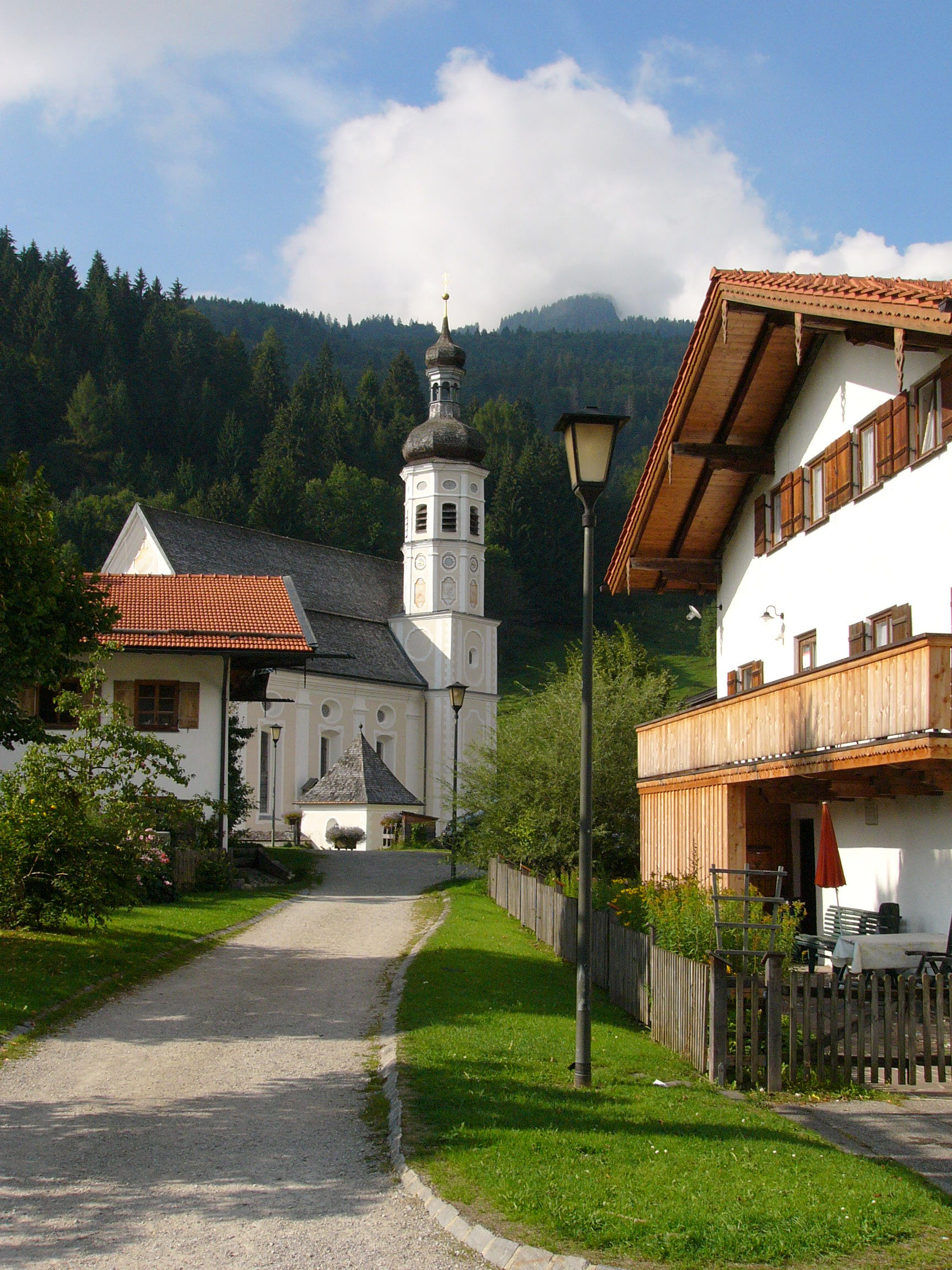
- Interactive map of Sachrang
- Location within Germany Location within Bavaria
- Coordinates: 47°41′24″N 12°15′44″E
- Country: Germany
- State: Bavaria
- District: Rosenheim
- Municipality: Aschau im Chiemgau

Area
  - Total: 38.99 km^{2} (15.05 sq mi)
- Elevation: 738 m (2,421 ft)

Population (1987)
  - Total: 571
  - Density: 14.6/km^{2} (37.9/sq mi)
- Time zone: UTC+01:00 (CET)
  - Summer (DST): UTC+02:00 (CEST)
- Postal codes: 83229
- Dialling codes: 08057

The village of Sachrang is an Ortsteil (quarter) of the municipality Aschau im Chiemgau, in Bavaria, Germany. It is located 738m above sea level.

It is the namesake for the Sachrang Formation.

== Notable people ==
- Werner Herzog, film director, raised in Sachrang
