= Stroszek =

1977 film by Werner Herzog

- US film poster
- Directed by: Werner Herzog
- Written by: Werner Herzog
- Produced by: Werner Herzog; Walter Saxer (Note: Uncredited)
- Starring: Bruno S.; Eva Mattes; Clemens Scheitz
- Cinematography: Thomas Mauch
- Edited by: Beate Mainka-Jellinghaus
- Music by: Chet Atkins; Sonny Terry
- Production companies: Werner Herzog Filmproduktion; ZDF
- Distributed by: Werner Herzog Filmproduktion
- Release date: 20 May 1977 (Munich)
- Running time: 116 minutes
- Countries: West Germany; United States
- Languages: German; English

Stroszek ([ˈstrɔʃɛk], promoted as Stroszek: A Ballad) is a 1977 West German tragicomedy (Note: Attributed to multiple sources:) film written, produced and directed by Werner Herzog and starring Bruno S., Eva Mattes, and Clemens Scheitz. The film is about an alcoholic street performer who moves from West Berlin to the American Midwest. Written specifically for Bruno S., the film was shot in Wisconsin and North Carolina. Most of the lead roles are played by inexperienced actors.

== Plot ==
Bruno Stroszek is a West Berlin street performer. Released from prison and warned to stop drinking, he immediately goes to a familiar bar where he meets Eva, a prostitute down on her luck, and lets her stay with him at the apartment his landlord kept for him. They are then harried and beaten by Eva's former pimps, who insult Bruno, destroy his accordion, and humiliate him by making him kneel on his piano with bells balanced on his back. Faced with the prospect of further harassment, Bruno and Eva decide to leave Germany with Bruno's eccentric elderly neighbor Scheitz, who plans to move to Wisconsin to live with his nephew Clayton.

After sightseeing in New York City, they buy a used car and arrive in a winter-bound, barren prairie near the town of Railroad Flats, Wisconsin. Bruno takes a job as a car mechanic with Clayton and his assistant, Eva works as a waitress at a truck stop diner, and Scheitz pursues his interest in animal magnetism. Eva and Bruno buy a mobile home which is sited on Clayton's land; with bills mounting, the bank threatens to repossess it. Eva returns to prostitution to supplement her wages, but it is not enough to meet the payments. She eventually tires of Bruno's worrying and leaves him, accepting a ride with truck drivers bound for Vancouver.

A collection agent visits Bruno, who is now drinking heavily, and has him release the home for auction. Scheitz believes there is a conspiracy against them and sets off with Stroszek to confront it. They try to rob the bank in town, find it closed, and hold up the barber shop beneath it instead. With $32 stolen, they go grocery shopping across the street. The police arrive and arrest Scheitz without noticing Bruno. Holding a large frozen turkey from the store and the shotgun used in the robbery, Bruno returns to the garage where he works, loads the tow truck with beer, and drives along a highway into the mountains.

The truck breaks down in a small mountain town and Bruno pulls over to a restaurant, where he tells his story to a German-speaking businessman. After the businessman leaves the penniless Bruno to pay for their meal, Bruno starts the truck and leaves it circling in the parking lot with a fire taking hold in the engine compartment. He enters a roadside attraction across the street and activates its coin-operated animal exhibits, then switches on a chairlift and rides it with the frozen turkey. After completing a trip up and down the mountainside, he passes out of view and a shot is heard. The police arrive at the scene to find the truck fully ablaze, Bruno's body still on the chairlift, and the animals performing nonstop.

== Cast ==
- Bruno S. as Bruno Stroszek
- Eva Mattes as Eva
- Clemens Scheitz as Scheitz
- Wilhelm von Homburg and Burkhard Driest as the pimps
- Clayton Szalpinski as Clayton
- Ely Rodriguez as Clayton's assistant
- Scott McKain as Scott, a home repossessor
- Alfred Edel as Jail warder
- Ralph Wade as Auctioneer
- Michael Gahr as Hoss
- Vaclav Vojta as Doctor
- Yüksel Topçugürler as Turkish prisoner
- Bob Evans as Bob

== Production ==
Stroszek was conceived during the production of Woyzeck, for which Herzog had originally planned to use Bruno S. (Bruno Schleinstein) in the title role. After coming to consider Klaus Kinski more suitable for that part, Herzog specifically wrote the leading role in Stroszek to compensate Schleinstein. Written in four days, the script uses a number of biographical details from Schleinstein's life.

Parts of the film were shot in Nekoosa, Wisconsin, and at a truck stop in Madison, Wisconsin. Other parts of the film were shot in Plainfield, Wisconsin. Herzog had planned to meet documentary filmmaker Errol Morris in Plainfield to dig up the grave of the infamous Plainfield-based serial killer and body snatcher Ed Gein's mother, but Morris never showed. The concluding scenes were shot in Cherokee, North Carolina. Edward Lachman was the film's second unit cinematographer.

== Reception and legacy ==
Film review aggregator Rotten Tomatoes reports a 96% approval critic response and an average score of 8.2/10 based on 23 reviews. Vincent Canby of The New York Times gave the film a positive review, stating: "It's a 'road' picture. In some distant way it reminds me of Easy Rider, but it's an Easy Rider without sentimentality or political paranoia. It's terrifically, spontaneously funny and, just as spontaneously, full of unexpected pathos." Gene Siskel of the Chicago Tribune awarded his top score of four stars and placed it at #10 on his 1978 year-end list, calling it a "strange, funny, heartbreaking film." Penelope Gilliatt of The New Yorker considered it "a brilliant, poetic film about a man's clutch on a difficult existence."

In a mixed review, Variety called Stroszek "a moody, overlong pic ... which seems to fizzle out and climax at least three times before the actual finale." Charles Champlin of the Los Angeles Times declared it "a strange and original piece of work ... if in its last third it is overwhelmed by its own symbolisms and is disappointing, it has in its first half some passages of terrific power and brutal believability." A less enthusiastic review by Gary Arnold of The Washington Post called it a "dogged, obstinately despairing parable" that "is strewn with gauche little appeals for sympathy." Richard Combs of The Monthly Film Bulletin was also somewhat negative: "On such well-trodden ground, it seems, Herzog has little to say that is not derivative of himself or others; one can only hope that he quickly finds his way back to more unfamiliar regions."

Geoff Andrew of Time Out said of the film that "Although relatively indulgent for Herzog, the film's comedy works well enough, because Herzog's idiosyncratic imagination finds an ideal counterpoint in the bleak flatlands of poor white America. His view of that country is the most askance since the films of Monte Hellman. For all the supposed lightness, it is the film's core of despair which in the end devours everything."

In 2002, Roger Ebert of the Chicago Sun-Times called it "one of the oddest films ever made" when including it as one of his "Great Movies".

Filmmaker David Lynch cited Stroszek as one of his favorite films.

English singer Ian Curtis of Joy Division reportedly watched Stroszek in the hours before his suicide.

=== Awards and nominations ===
Institution	Year	Category	Nominee	Result
German Film Awards	1978	Best Actress in a Leading Role	Eva Mattes	Nominated
German Film Critics Association	1978	Best Film	Werner Herzog	Won
Taormina Film Fest	1977	Golden Charybdis	Werner Herzog	Nominated
Taormina Film Fest	1977	Special Jury Prize	Werner Herzog	Won
