= The Watts Prophets =

Rap group

- Also known as: Watts Prophets
- Origin: Watts, California, United States
- Genres: Political poetry
- Years active: 1967–present
- Members: Fr Amde Hamilton (b. Anthony Hamilton)
- Past members: Richard Dedeaux (d. 2013); Otis O'Solomon (d. 2022)
- Website: https://wattsprophets.org

The Watts Prophets were an American political poetry group from Watts, California, United States. Like their contemporaries The Last Poets, the group combined elements of jazz music and spoken-word performance, making the trio one that is often seen as a forerunner of contemporary hip-hop music.

Formed in 1967, the group comprised Richard Dedeaux, Fr Amde Hamilton (born Anthony Hamilton), and Otis O'Solomon (also billed as Otis O'Solomon Smith) (O'Solomon removed the "Smith" from his name in the 1970s). Hamilton is the last surviving member as of March 2022.

== History ==
Hamilton, O'Solomon, and Dedeaux first met and collaborated at the Watts Writers Workshop, an organization created by Budd Schulberg in the wake of the Watts Riots, as the Civil Rights Movement was beginning to take a new cultural turn. Fusing music with jazz and funk roots, and rapid-fire, spoken-word poetry, they created a sound that gave them a considerable local following. They released two albums, 1969's The Black Voices: On the Streets in Watts and 1971's Rappin' Black in a White World, which established a strong tendency toward social commentary and a reputation for militancy. The group was unable to secure another record deal; a promising deal with Bob Marley's Tuff Gong label famously fell through. Unable to sustain success, the group has performed only sporadically since the mid-1970s.

In recent years, the group's profile has improved somewhat. The 1997 recording, When the 90's Came, found them in the studio with pianist Horace Tapscott, and a European tour reunited the trio with former collaborator DeeDee McNeil. In 2005, Things Gonna Get Greater: The Watts Prophets 1969-1971 combined the group's first two efforts, bringing them back into print for the first time in more than a decade.

Amde Hamilton, who is now a priest of the Ethiopian Orthodox Tewahedo Church, can be seen performing a spoken-word piece at the 1981 funeral service of Bob Marley in Jamaica in the 1982 film Land of Look Behind. He also claims to have baptized Nina Simone (who was later funeralized in a Catholic church—the faith in which Hamilton was raised).

In 1994, the group appeared on the Red Hot Organization's compilation CD, Stolen Moments: Red Hot + Cool, appearing on a track entitled "Apprehension" alongside Don Cherry (trumpeter). The album, meant to raise awareness of the AIDS epidemic in African-American society was named "Album of the Year" by Time Magazine.

Richard Dedeaux died in December 2013. O'Solomon died in March 2022.

== Discography ==
- 1969 - The Black Voices: On the Streets in Watts
- 1971 - Rappin' Black in a White World
- 1997 - When the 90's Came
- 2005 - Things Gonna Get Greater: The Watts Prophets 1969-1971 (compilation)

== See also ==
- The Last Poets
- Gil Scott-Heron
