= Of Walking in Ice =

1978 book by Werner Herzog

- First edition (publ. Hanser)
- Author: Werner Herzog
- Original title: Vom Gehen im Eis
- Translator: Martje Herzog; Alan Greenberg
- Language: German
- Genre: Diary
- Publisher: Free Association
- Publication date: 1978
- Publication place: Germany
- English publication date: 2008
- Media type: Print (paperback)
- Pages: 68
- ISBN: 978-0-9796121-0-7
- OCLC: 194118757

Of Walking in Ice (German: Vom Gehen im Eis) is the diary of the German film director Werner Herzog, published in 1978 and reissued by University of Minnesota Press in 2015. It was written in German and translated into English.

== Content ==
The diary was written and takes place between November 23 and December 14, 1974. In the foreword, Herzog says that he received a call from a friend in Paris, informing him that his close friend, the German film historian Lotte H. Eisner, was ill and dying. Herzog was determined to prevent this, and believed that an act of walking would keep Eisner from death. He took a jacket, a compass and a duffel bag with the barest essentials and, wearing a pair of new boots, set off on a three-week pilgrimage from Munich to Paris through the deep chill and snowstorms of winter. Eisner lived another nine years after his journey.
