= Werner Herzog =

German director, producer, screenwriter (born 1942)

- Herzog in 2026
- Born: Werner Stipetić; 5 September 1942 (age 84); Munich, Germany
- Education: Duquesne University; LMU Munich
- Occupations: Filmmaker; actor; opera director; author
- Years active: 1961–present
- Works: Full list
- Spouses: Martje Grohmann (m. 1967; div. 1985) Christine Maria Ebenberger (m. 1987; div. 1997) Lena Pisetski (m. 1999)
- Children: 3
- Relatives: Lucki Stipetić (half-brother)
- Awards: Full list
- Werner Herzog's voice Recorded March 2012 from the BBC Radio 4 programme Start the Week
- Website: WernerHerzog.com

Signature
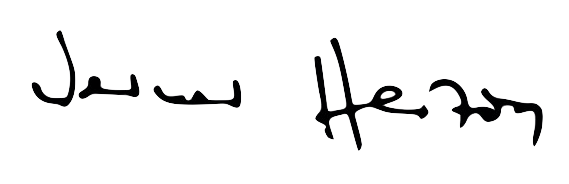

Werner Herzog (German: [ˈvɛʁnɐ ˈhɛʁtsoːk]; né Stipetić; born 5 September 1942) is a German filmmaker, actor, opera director, author, and documentarian. Regarded as a pioneer of New German Cinema, his films often feature ambitious protagonists with impossible dreams, people with unusual talents in obscure fields, or individuals in conflict with nature. His film-making process involves avoiding storyboards, emphasizing improvisation, and placing his cast and crew into real situations mirroring those in the film on which they are working. He has received numerous accolades including a Silver Bear Award, four Awards at the Cannes Film Festival and the Golden Lion for Lifetime Achievement at the Venice Film Festival in addition to a nomination for an Academy Award.

In 1961, when Herzog was 19, he started work on his first film, Herakles. He is known for his collaborations with the actor Klaus Kinski, whom he directed in the films Aguirre, the Wrath of God (1972), Nosferatu the Vampyre, Woyzeck (both 1979), Fitzcarraldo (1982) and Cobra Verde (1987) and chronicled their tumultuous relationship in the documentary film My Best Fiend (1999). Other films he has directed include The Enigma of Kaspar Hauser (1974), Heart of Glass (1976), Stroszek (1977), Invincible (2001), and Bad Lieutenant: Port of Call New Orleans (2009) as well as the documentary films Lessons of Darkness (1992), Little Dieter Needs to Fly (1997), Grizzly Man (2005), Encounters at the End of the World (2007), Cave of Forgotten Dreams (2010), and Into the Abyss (2011).

Herzog has also published over 12 books of prose, including the autobiography Every Man for Himself and God Against All: A Memoir (2022) and directed over two dozen operas. He has acted in a number of films and television series, often as a fictionalised version of himself, including Incident at Loch Ness (2004), The Grand (2007), The Boondocks (2010), The Simpsons (2011-2021), Jack Reacher, American Dad!, Metalocalypse (all 2012), the English dub of The Wind Rises (2013), Penguins of Madagascar (2014), Parks and Recreation, Rick and Morty (both 2015), and The Mandalorian (2019).

French filmmaker François Truffaut once called Herzog "the most important film director alive". American film critic Roger Ebert said that Herzog "has never created a single film that is compromised, shameful, made for pragmatic reasons, or uninteresting. Even his failures are spectacular". Herzog and his films have received recognition from the Berlin International Film Festival, Cannes Film Festival, Directors Guild of America, Sundance Film Festival, Telluride Film Festival and Venice Film Festival, as well as nominations for an Academy Award, a BAFTA, and two Emmys. He was named one of the world's 100 most influential people by Time in 2009.

== Early life and background ==
Herzog was born Werner Stipetić in Munich, German Reich, on 5 September 1942, the son of Elisabeth Stipetić and Dietrich Herzog. His mother was Austrian with Croatian ancestry, while his father was German. When he was two weeks old, his mother took refuge in the remote Bavarian village of Sachrang in the Chiemgau Alps, after the house next to theirs was destroyed during an Allied bombing raid in World War II.

Alongside his older brother Till and younger half-brother Lucki, he grew up without running water, a flushing toilet, or a telephone. Herzog recounted that his family had "no toys" and "no tools" and said that there was a sense of anarchy, as all the fathers of the village's children were absent. He never saw films, and did not even know cinema existed until a traveling projectionist came by the one-room schoolhouse in Sachrang.

When Herzog was 12, he moved back to Munich with his family. His father had abandoned the family early in his youth, but he later adopted his father's surname (which is German for 'duke'), as he thought it sounded more impressive for a filmmaker. Herzog once told journalist Brandon Kosters that cave paintings were his "very first intellectual fascination independent of my family or independent of school. A fascination that I developed myself when I was 12 or 13 years, and it has never left me completely", and this inspired later film projects. Herzog made his first phone call when he was 17. Two years later, he started work on his first film, Herakles.

Herzog says that when he eventually met his father again, "fairly late in life", his mother had to translate Werner's German into the Bavarian language, which his father spoke, so the two could communicate. Herzog, aged 13, was told by a bullying music teacher to sing in front of his class at school in what Herzog described as an effort "to break my back". When he adamantly refused, he was almost expelled. The incident scarred him for life. For several years, Herzog avoided music entirely; he did not listen to it, sing it, or study any instrument. But when he turned 18, he threw himself into it with sudden, intense devotion.

At an early age, he experienced a dramatic phase in which he converted to Catholicism, which lasted only a few years. He started to embark on long journeys, some on foot. Around this time, he knew he would be a filmmaker and learned the basics from a few pages in an encyclopedia that provided him with "everything I needed to get myself started" as a filmmaker—that, and the 35 mm camera he stole from the Munich Film School. In the commentary for Aguirre, the Wrath of God, he says, "I don't consider it theft. It was just a necessity. I had some sort of natural right for a camera, a tool to work with".

During Herzog's last years of high school, no production company was willing to take on his projects, so he worked night shifts as a welder in a steel factory to earn the funds for his first featurettes. When he finished school, but before he formally graduated, he followed his girlfriend to Manchester, England, where he spent several months and learned to speak English. He found the language classes pointless and "fled". After graduating from high school, he was intrigued by the post-independence Congo, but in attempting to travel there, reached only the south of Sudan before falling seriously ill and returning to Germany. While already making films, he had a brief stint at LMU Munich, where he studied history and literature.

At the age of 20, Herzog moved to Pittsburgh, Pennsylvania, to study at Duquesne University. After being discovered violating his student visa by working for a producer at the television station WQED, Herzog fled to Mexico. He worked first as a charreada before injuring himself, then turned to smuggling TV and stereo sets across the border. He later moved to San Miguel de Allende, and then sought to travel to Guatemala, as he was "obsessed with the vague idea that I would help form an independent Mayan state in Petén." His plans were cut short when he contracted hepatitis, and he drove back to Pittsburgh to be treated before returning to Germany.

== Career ==
=== Early and mid-career: 1962–2005 ===
Herzog, along with Rainer Werner Fassbinder, Wim Wenders, and Volker Schlöndorff, led the beginning of the New German Cinema, which included documentarians who filmed on low budgets and were influenced by the French New Wave. He developed a habit of casting professional actors alongside people from the locality in which he was shooting. His films, "usually set in distinct and unfamiliar landscapes, are imbued with mysticism." Herzog says his youthful experience with Catholicism is evident in "something of a religious echo in my work".

In 1971, while Herzog was location scouting for Aguirre, the Wrath of God in Peru, he narrowly avoided taking LANSA Flight 508 when his reservation was cancelled due to a last-minute change in itinerary. The plane was later struck by lightning and disintegrated; only one survivor, Juliane Koepcke, lived after a free fall. Long haunted by the event, Herzog eventually made a documentary film, Wings of Hope (1998), about Koepcke. Aguirre marked Herzog's first collaboration with Klaus Kinski; Herzog had first met the volatile actor as a teenager when Kinski, then a struggling performer, had lived in the same boarding house as his family, and felt that only he could portray the film's maniacal protagonist. Herzog and Kinski would go on to make together Nosferatu the Vampyre (1979); Woyzeck (1979); Fitzcarraldo (1982); and Cobra Verde (1987).

Herzog and his films have been nominated for and won many awards. His first major award was the Silver Bear Extraordinary Prize of the Jury at the Berlin International Film Festival for his first feature film Signs of Life (Nosferatu the Vampyre was also nominated for the festival's Golden Bear in 1979). Herzog won the Best Director award for Fitzcarraldo at the 1982 Cannes Film Festival. In 1975, The Enigma of Kaspar Hauser won the Grand Prix Spécial du Jury (also known as the "Silver Palm") and the Prize of the Ecumenical Jury at Cannes. Other films directed by Herzog nominated for Golden Palm are Woyzeck (1979) and Where the Green Ants Dream (1984).

His films have been nominated at many other festivals around the world: César Awards (Aguirre, the Wrath of God), Emmy Awards (Little Dieter Needs to Fly), European Film Awards (My Best Fiend) and Venice Film Festival (Scream of Stone and The Wild Blue Yonder). In 1987, Herzog and his half-brother Lucki Stipetić won the Bavarian Film Award for Best Producing for the film Cobra Verde. In 1999, he released My Best Fiend, a documentary about his tumultuous professional relationship with Kinski, which was screened out of competition at the Cannes Film Festival. In 2002, he won the Dragon of Dragons Honorary Award at the Kraków Film Festival.

Herzog once promised to eat his shoe if Errol Morris completed a film project on pet cemeteries that he had been working on, to challenge and motivate Morris, as he perceived Morris to be incapable of following up on the projects he conceived. In 1978, when the film Gates of Heaven premiered, Herzog cooked and publicly ate his shoe; the event was later incorporated into a short documentary, Werner Herzog Eats His Shoe (1980), by Les Blank. Herzog suggested that he hoped the act would serve to encourage anyone having difficulty bringing a project to fruition.

In the winter of 1974, German-French writer Lotte H. Eisner, a friend and mentor of Herzog's since the late 1950s, fell gravely ill. Herzog walked from Munich to Paris, believing that she would not die if he did so. During these travels, which took him three weeks, he kept a diary that was eventually published as Of Walking in Ice. Eight years later, the 87-year-old Eisner allegedly complained to Herzog of her infirmities and told him, "I am saturated with life. There is still this spell upon me that I must not die—can you lift it?". He says that he agreed to do so, and she died eight days later.

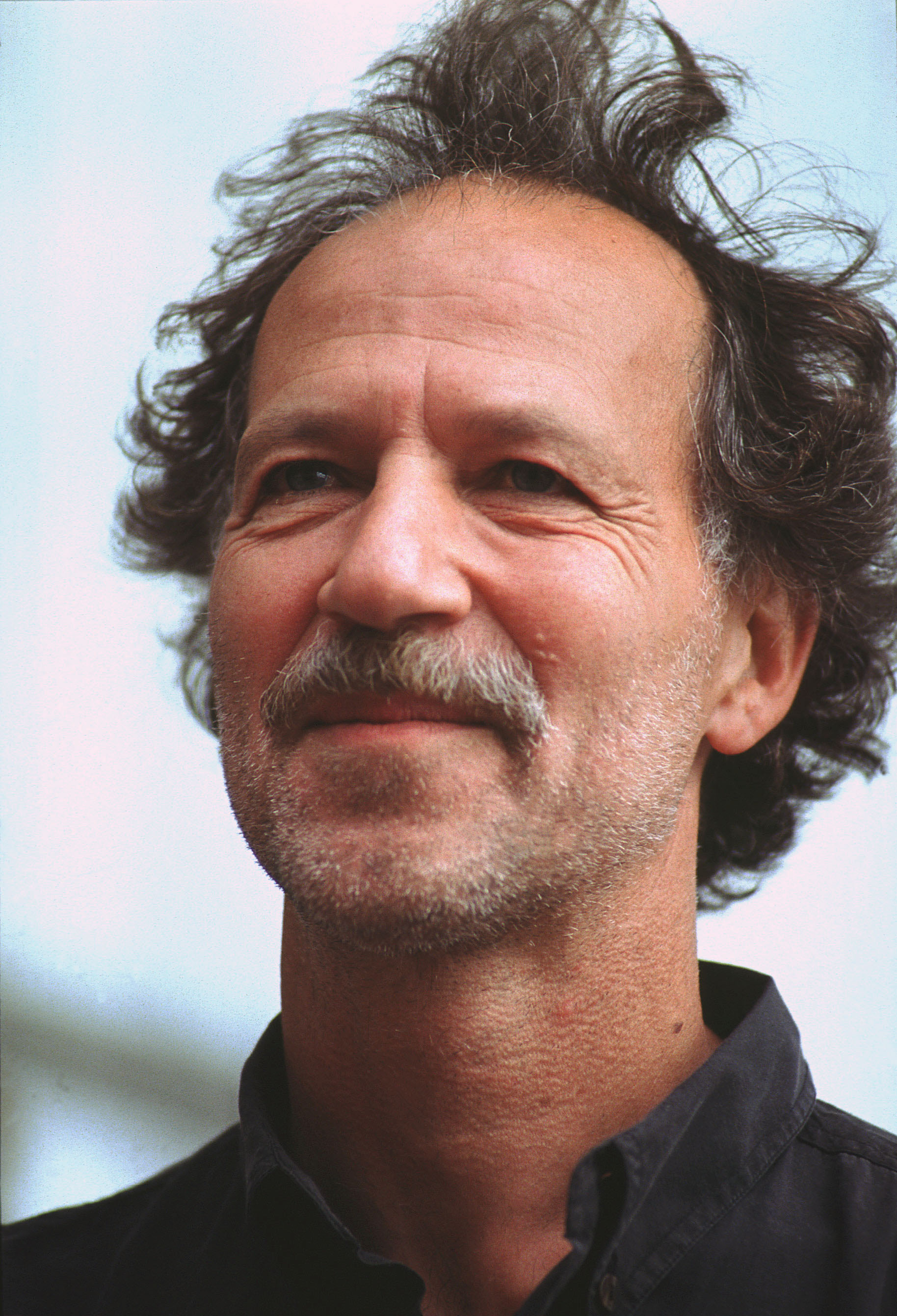
Herzog at the 1991 Venice International Film Festival

Werner Herzog moved to Los Angeles with his wife in the late 1990s. He said of the city, "Wherever you look is an immense depth, a tumult that resonates with me. New York [City] is more concerned with finance than anything else. It doesn't create culture, only consumes it; most of what you find in New York comes from elsewhere. Things actually get done in Los Angeles. Look beyond the glitz and glamour of Hollywood and a wild excitement of intense dreams opens up; it has more horizons than any other place. There is a great deal of industry in the city and a real working class; I also appreciate the vibrant presence of the Mexicans."

=== Later directorial career: 2006 onwards ===
Herzog was honored at the 49th San Francisco International Film Festival, receiving the 2006 Film Society Directing Award. Four of his films have been shown at the San Francisco International Film Festival: Wodaabe – Herdsmen of the Sun in 1990, Bells from the Deep in 1993, Lessons of Darkness in 1993, and The Wild Blue Yonder in 2006.

Grizzly Man, a documentary about Timothy Treadwell directed by Herzog, was awarded the Alfred P. Sloan Prize at the 2005 Sundance Film Festival. He seemed to attract danger even in more suburban settings. In 2006, Herzog was shot with an air rifle in the abdomen while on Skyline Drive in Los Angeles. He had been giving an interview on Grizzly Man to Mark Kermode of the BBC. Herzog continued the interview without seeking medical treatment, stating "it's not significant". It was later revealed that the shooter was a crazed fan. Regarding the incident, Herzog later said, "I seem to attract the clinically insane." In a 2021 episode of Diminishing Returns podcast covering Herzog's film Stroszek, presenter Dallas Campbell called this incident a hoax, claiming to be friends with the director of the piece and that the incident was "set up".

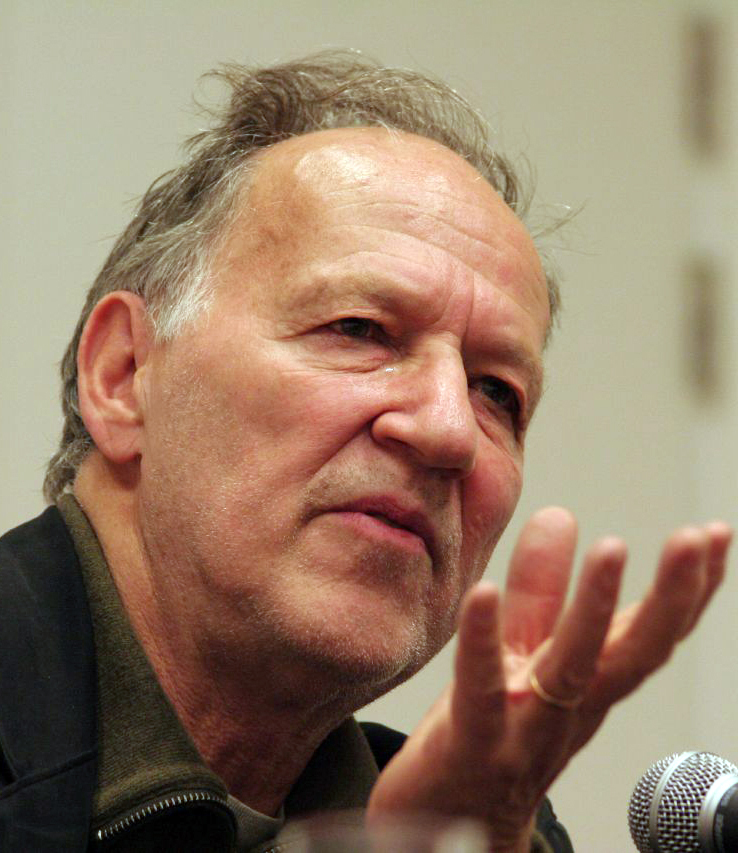
Herzog at a press conference in Brussels, 2007

Herzog's April 2007 appearance at the Ebertfest in Champaign, Illinois, earned him the Golden Thumb Award, and an engraved glockenspiel given by a young filmmaker inspired by his films. Encounters at the End of the World, set in Antarctica, won the award for Best Documentary at the 2008 Edinburgh International Film Festival and was nominated for the Academy Award for Best Documentary Feature, Herzog's first Oscar nomination. In 2009, Herzog became the only filmmaker in recent history to enter two films in competition in the same year at the Venice Film Festival. Herzog's Bad Lieutenant: Port of Call New Orleans was entered into the festival's official competition schedule, and his My Son, My Son, What Have Ye Done? entered the competition as a "surprise film". Herzog also provided the narration for the short film Plastic Bag, directed by Ramin Bahrani, which was the opening-night film in the Corto Cortissimo section of the festival.

Herzog completed a documentary called Cave of Forgotten Dreams in 2010, which shows his journey into the Chauvet Cave in France. Although generally skeptical of 3D film as a format, Herzog premiered the film at the 2010 Toronto International Film Festival in three dimensional form and had its European premiere at the 2011 Berlinale. Also in 2010, Herzog co-directed with Dimitry Vasuykov Happy People: A Year in the Taiga, which portrays the life of fur trappers and their families in the Siberian part of the Taiga; it premiered at the 2010 Telluride Film Festival.

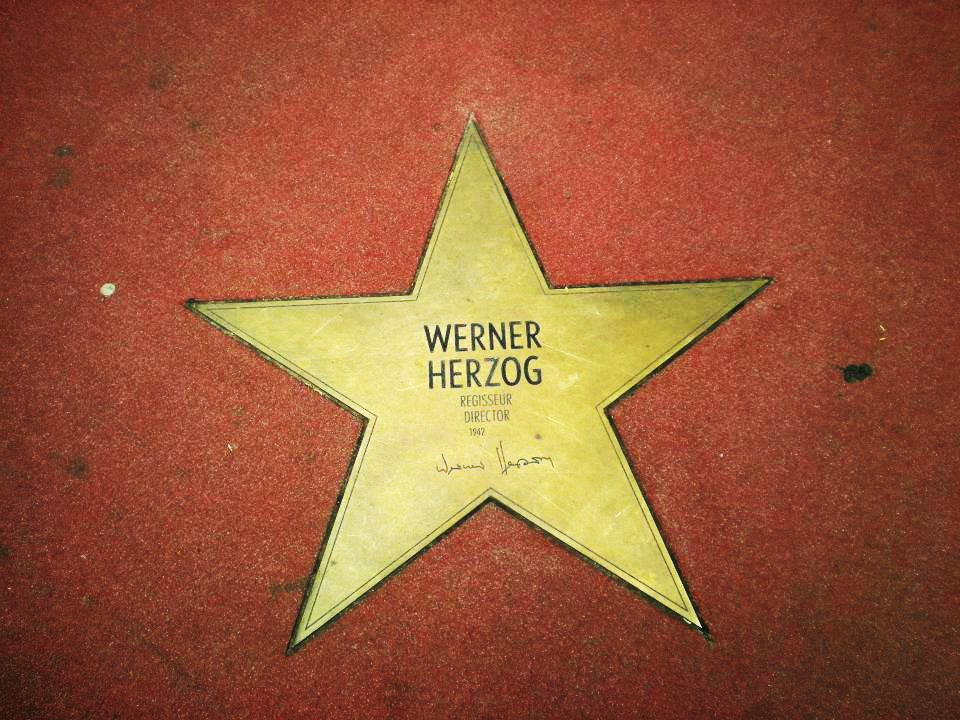
Boulevard der Stars in Berlin

Herzog has narrated many of his documentary films. He provides a deadpan narration for the introduction of episodes of the comedic series Conan O'Brien Must Go.

In 2011, Herzog competed with Ridley Scott to make a film based on the life of British explorer Gertrude Bell. In 2012, it was confirmed that Herzog would start production on his long-in-development project in March 2013 in Morocco with Naomi Watts to play Gertrude Bell along with Robert Pattinson to play T. E. Lawrence and Jude Law to play Henry Cadogan. The film was completed in 2014 with a different cast: Nicole Kidman as Gertrude Bell, James Franco as Henry Cadogan, Damian Lewis as Charles Doughty-Wylie, and Robert Pattinson as a 22-year-old archaeologist T. E. Lawrence. Queen of the Desert had its world premiere at the 2015 Berlin International Film Festival.

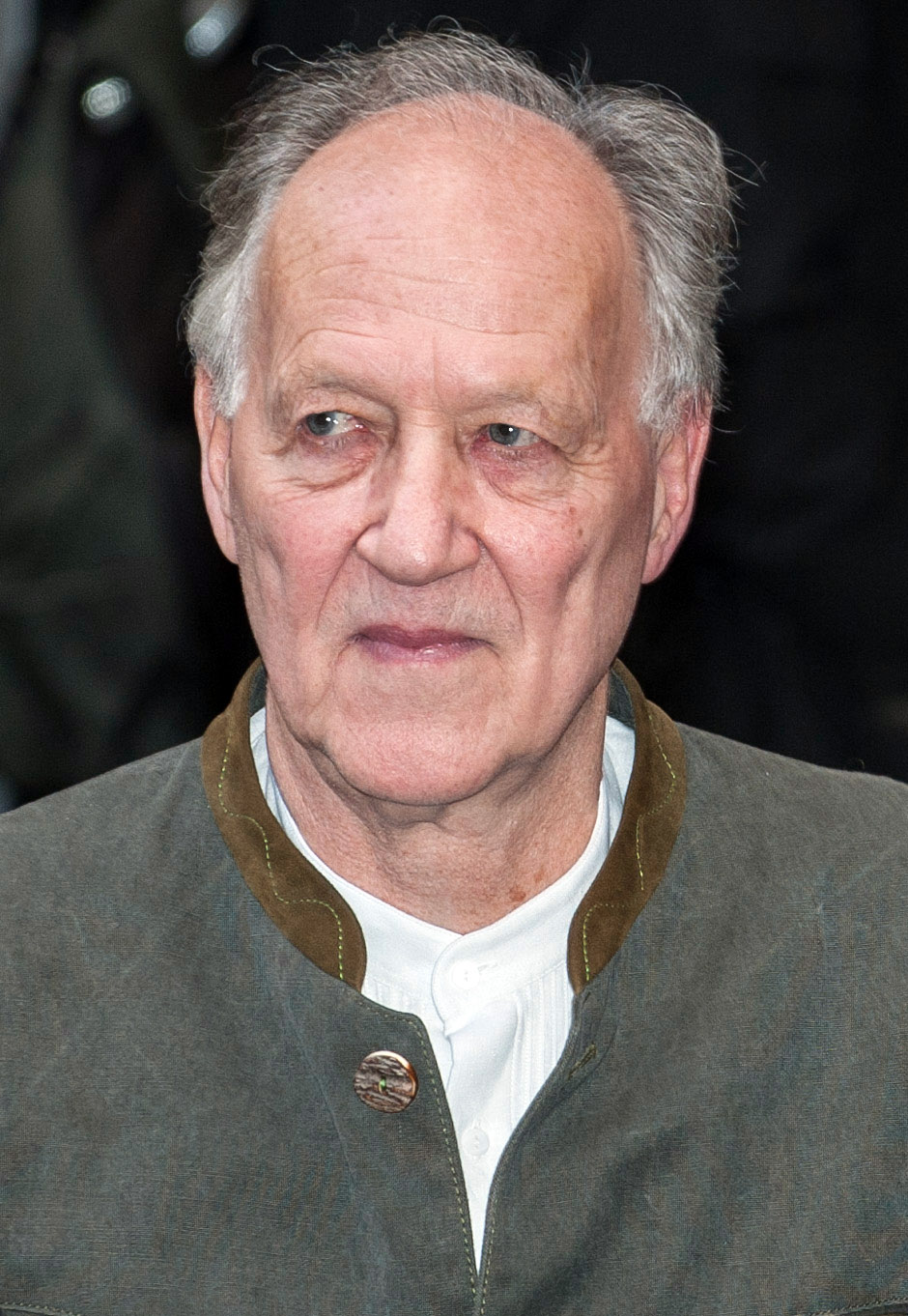
Herzog in 2015

In 2015, Herzog shot a feature film, Salt and Fire, in Bolivia, starring Veronica Ferres, Michael Shannon, and Gael García Bernal. It is described as a "highly explosive drama inspired by a short story by Tom Bissell".

=== Acting and other endeavours ===
Dissatisfied with the way film schools are run, in 2009, Herzog founded his own Rogue Film School. For the students, Herzog has said, "I prefer people who have worked as bouncers in a sex club, or have been wardens in the lunatic asylum. You must live life in its very elementary forms. The Costa Ricans have a very nice word for it: pura vida. It doesn't mean just purity of life, but the raw, stark-naked quality of life. And that's what makes young people more into a filmmaker than academia." Notable alumni include Keirda Bahruth, Nir Sa'ar, Bob Baldori, Sean Gill, Frederick Kroetsch, George Hickenlooper and director/photojournalist Roger M. Richards.

Herzog was selected to be the president of the jury at the 60th Berlin International Film Festival in 2010.

In 2010, he expanded his reach by performing a voiceover for an animated television program for the first time, appearing in The Boondocks in its third-season premiere episode "It's a Black President, Huey Freeman". In the episode, he played a fictionalized version of himself interviewing the series' main characters for a documentary about the 2008 United States presidential election.

Continuing with voice work, Herzog played Walter Hotenhoffer in The Simpsons episode "The Scorpion's Tale", which aired in March 2011. The next year, he also appeared in the eighth-season episode of American Dad!, called "Ricky Spanish". He lent his voice to a recurring character during the fourth season of the Adult Swim animated series Metalocalypse. In 2015, he voiced Old Reptile for Adult Swim's Rick and Morty.

He appeared in person opposite Tom Cruise as the villain Zec Chelovek in the 2012 action film Jack Reacher. Herzog gained attention in 2013 when he released a 35-minute public service announcement-style documentary, From One Second to the Next, demonstrating the danger of texting while driving and financed by AT&T, Sprint, Verizon, and T-Mobile as part of their It Can Wait driver safety campaign. The film, which documents four stories in which texting and driving led to tragedy or death, initially received more than 1.7 million YouTube views and was subsequently distributed to over 40,000 high schools. In July 2013, Herzog contributed to an art installation entitled "Hearsay of the Soul", for the Whitney Biennial, which was later acquired as a permanent exhibit by the J. Paul Getty Museum in Los Angeles. In late 2013, he voiced Castorp in the English dub of Hayao Miyazaki's The Wind Rises.

In 2019, Herzog joined the cast of the Disney+ live-action Star Wars television series The Mandalorian, portraying The Client, a character with nebulous connections to the Empire. Herzog accepted the role after being impressed with the screenplay, although he said he had never seen any of the Star Wars films.

In June 2022, Herzog published his debut novel The Twilight World, a fictionalized account of Hiroo Onoda, a Japanese soldier in World War II who only surrendered in 1974 after hiding out on Lubang Island in the Philippines for almost 29 years. Herzog had met Onoda in Tokyo more than two decades before, and the two had discussed the jungle; Herzog used jungles as settings of many of his important works. He has said, "Most details are factually correct; some are not".

== Film theory ==
=== Style ===
Herzog's films have received considerable critical acclaim and achieved popularity on the arthouse circuit. They have also been the subject of controversy in regard to their themes and messages, especially the circumstances surrounding their creation. A notable example is Fitzcarraldo, in which the obsessiveness of the central character was reflected by the director during the making of the film. Burden of Dreams, a documentary filmed during the making of Fitzcarraldo, explored Herzog's efforts to make the film in harsh conditions. Herzog's diaries during the making of Fitzcarraldo were published as Conquest of the Useless: Reflections from the Making of Fitzcarraldo. Mark Harris of The New York Times wrote in his review: "The movie and its making are both fables of daft aspiration, investigations of the blurry border between having a dream and losing one's mind."

Herzog has said that our civilization is "starving for new images". In a 1982 interview with Roger Ebert, he explained, "We do not have adequate images for our kind of civilization...We are surrounded by images that are worn out, and I believe that unless we discover new images, we will die out." He has said it is his mission to help us discover new images: "I am trying to make something that has not been made before." He is proud of never using storyboards and often improvising large parts of the script. He explains this technique in the commentary track to Aguirre, the Wrath of God.

In 1999, before a public dialogue with Ebert at the Walker Art Center in Minneapolis, Minnesota, Herzog read a manifesto which he dubbed "Minnesota Declaration: Truth and Fact in Documentary Cinema". Subtitled "Lessons of Darkness" after his film of that name, the 12-point declaration began: "Cinéma Vérité is devoid of vérité. It reaches a merely superficial truth, the truth of accountants." Herzog explained, "There are deeper strata of truth in cinema, and there is such a thing as poetic, ecstatic truth. It is mysterious and elusive, and can be reached only through fabrication and imagination and stylization" and "facts sometimes have a strange and bizarre power that makes their inherent truth seem unbelievable." Ebert later wrote of its significance: "For the first time, it fully explained his theory of 'ecstatic truth.'" In 2017, Herzog wrote a six-point addendum to the manifesto, prompted by a question about "truth in an age of alt-facts".

Herzog's treatment of subjects has been characterized as Wagnerian in its scope, but film theory has in recent years focused on the concept of the ecstatic and the nomadic character of his film. The plot of Fitzcarraldo is based on the building of an opera house and his later film Invincible (2001) touches on the character of Siegfried. Herzog's documentary The Transformation of the World into Music goes behind the scenes of the Bayreuth Festival. Herzog has directed productions of several operas, including Mozart's The Magic Flute, Beethoven's Fidelio, and Wagner's Parsifal.

=== Teaching ===
Critical of film schools, Herzog has taught three cinema workshops. From 2009 to 2016, he organized the Rogue Film School, in which young directors spent a few days with him in evocative locations. What exactly goes on at the rogue film school has been clouded in secrecy, but director and writer Kristoffer Hegnsvad report from his stay there in his book Werner Herzog – Ecstatic Truth and Other Useless Conquests: "The first thing you notice is his enormous presence. His self-confidence sends shockwaves through a room every time he opens his mouth or make eye contact; he adopts a stance of exalted calm, as though he has achieved some kind of mastery – not just over his own mind, but over the capriciousness of the world." Lessons ranged from "How does music function in film?" to "The creation of your own shooting permits".

In 2018, he held "Filming in Peru with Werner Herzog", a 12-day workshop in the Amazonian rainforest, close to the locations for Fitzcarraldo, for new filmmakers from around the world. Each made a short film under Herzog's supervision. Herzog was enthusiastic, and said of the resulting films, "the best 10 of them are better than the selections for best short film at the Academy Awards". Herzog is also on the website MasterClass, where he presents a course on filmmaking, entitled "Werner Herzog teaches filmmaking". In a discussion with filmmaker Errol Morris at the Toronto Film Festival, Morris, who was influenced by Herzog's early films, joked that he considered himself one of the first students of the Rogue Film School. Regarding Herzog's influence on him, Morris quoted Gabriel García Márquez's reaction to reading Franz Kafka for the first time: "I didn't know you were allowed to do that."

== Personal life ==
Herzog has been married three times and has three children. In 1967, he married Martje Grohmann. They had a son, born 1973. They divorced in 1985. He later began dating Austrian-German actress Eva Mattes. They had a daughter, born 1980, before splitting up. He married Christine Maria Ebenberger in 1987, and they had a son, born 1989. They divorced in 1997. Herzog moved to Los Angeles in 1996 and married Russian-American photographer Elena Pisetski in 1999.

Herzog has been described as an atheist. In addition to standard German and his native Bavarian, he speaks English, Greek, Italian and Spanish. He can also read Latin and Ancient Greek.

Herzog has said that he loves the writers Osip Mandelstam and Robert Walser. He has also named as great poets Li Ho, Johann Christian Günther, Andreas Gryphius, Friedrich Spee, and Angelus Silesius.

== Filmography ==
Since 1962, Herzog has directed 20 fiction feature films, 7 fiction short films, and 34 documentary feature films, as well as eight documentary short films and episodes of two television series. He has also been the screenwriter or co-writer for all his films and for four others, and has appeared as an actor in 26 film or television productions.

== Awards and nominations ==
Organizations	Year	Category	Nominated work	Result	Ref.
Academy Awards	2008	Best Documentary Feature	Encounters at the End of the World	Nominated	
Berlin International Film Festival	1968	Golden Bear	Signs of Life	Nominated	
Berlin International Film Festival	1968	Silver Bear	Signs of Life	Won	
Berlin International Film Festival	1979	Golden Bear	Nosferatu the Vampyre	Nominated	
Berlin International Film Festival	2015	Golden Bear	Queen of the Desert	Nominated	
BAFTA Awards	1982	Best Film Not in the English Language	Fitzcarraldo	Nominated	
Cannes Film Festival	1975	Palme d'Or	The Enigma of Kaspar Hauser	Nominated	
Cannes Film Festival	1975	Grand Prize of the Jury	The Enigma of Kaspar Hauser	Won	
Cannes Film Festival	1975	Prize of the Ecumenical Jury	The Enigma of Kaspar Hauser	Won	
Cannes Film Festival	1975	FIPRESCI Prize	The Enigma of Kaspar Hauser	Won	
Cannes Film Festival	1979	Palme d'Or	Woyzeck	Nominated	
Cannes Film Festival	1982	Palme d'Or	Fitzcarraldo	Nominated	
Cannes Film Festival	1982	Best Director	Fitzcarraldo	Won	
Cannes Film Festival	1984	Palme d'Or	Where the Green Ants Dream	Nominated	
Cannes Film Festival	2002	Un Certain Regard Award	Ten Minutes Older: The Trumpet	Nominated	
César Awards	1976	Best Foreign Film	Aguirre, the Wrath of God	Nominated	
Directors Guild of America	2005	Outstanding Directing - Documentary	Grizzly Man	Won	
Independent Spirit Awards	2005	Best Documentary	Encounters at the End of the World	Nominated	
Independent Spirit Awards	2008	Best Documentary	Grizzly Man	Nominated	
News and Documentary Emmy Awards	2007	Outstanding Science, Technology and Nature Programming	Grizzly Man	Nominated	
News and Documentary Emmy Awards	2017	Best Documentary	The Look of Silence	Nominated	
News and Documentary Emmy Awards	2017	Outstanding Investigative Documentary	The Look of Silence	Nominated	
News and Documentary Emmy Awards	2017	Outstanding Science and Technology Documentary	Into the Inferno	Nominated	
Primetime Emmy Awards	1999	Outstanding Non-Fiction Special	Little Dieter Needs to Fly	Nominated	
Primetime Emmy Awards	2026	Outstanding Narrator	Ghost Elephants	Nominated	
San Sebastián International Film Festival	2026	Donostia Award	In recognition of his career	Won	
Sundance Film Festival	2005	Documentary - World Cinema	Grizzly Man	Nominated	
Sundance Film Festival	2005	Alfred P. Sloan Feature Film Prize	Grizzly Man	Won	
Telluride Film Festival	1975	Silver Medallion Award	Himself	Honored	
Venice International Film Festival	1990	Bastone Bianco Award - Special Mention	Echoes From a Somber Empire	Won	
Venice International Film Festival	1991	Golden Lion	Scream of Stone	Nominated	
Venice International Film Festival	2001	Lion of the Year	Invincible	Nominated	
Venice International Film Festival	2005	Venice Horizons Award	The Wild Blue Yonder	Nominated	
Venice International Film Festival	2005	FIPRESCI Prize	The Wild Blue Yonder	Won	
Venice International Film Festival	2009	Golden Lion	My Son, My Son, What Have Ye Done	Nominated	
Venice International Film Festival	2009	Golden Lion	Bad Lieutenant: Port of Call New Orleans	Nominated	
Venice International Film Festival	2009	Christopher D. Smithers Foundation Special Award	Bad Lieutenant: Port of Call New Orleans	Won	
Venice International Film Festival	2025	Career Golden Lion	Himself	Honored	

== Stage works ==
Opera Source:

- Doktor Faust (1986, Teatro Comunale di Bologna)
- Lohengrin (1987, Bayreuth Festival)
- Giovanna d'Arco (1989, Teatro Comunale di Bologna)
- The Magic Flute (1991, Teatro Massimo Bellini, Catania)
- La donna del lago (1992, Teatro alla Scala, Milan)
- Der fliegende Holländer (1993, Opéra Bastille)
- Norma (1994, Verona Arena)
- Il Guarany (1994, Theater Bonn)
- Il Guarany (1996, Washington National Opera)
- Tannhäuser (1997 Opéra Royal de Wallonie; Liège)
- Tannhäuser (1997 Teatro de la Maestranza; Sevilla)
- Chūshingura (1997, Tokyo Opera)
- Tannhäuser (1998 Teatro Massimo; Palermo)
- Tannhäuser (1998 Teatro di San Carlo; Naples)
- Fidelio (1999, La Scala, Milan)
- Tannhäuser (1999 Teatro Real; Madrid)
- The Magic Flute (1999, Teatro Massimo Bellini, Catania)
- Tannhäuser (1999 Teatro Real; Madrid)
- Tannhäuser (2000 Baltimore Opera Company; Baltimore)
- The Magic Flute (2001, Baltimore Opera Company, Baltimore)
- Tannhäuser (2001 Houston Grand Opera; Houston)
- Tannhäuser (2001 Theatro Municipal (Rio de Janeiro); Rio de Janeiro)
- Giovanna d'Arco (2001, Teatro Carlo Felice, Genoa)
- Der fliegende Holländer (2002, DomStufen Festspiele Erfurt)
- Fidelio (2003, La Scala, Milan)
- Parsifal (2008, Palau de les Arts, Valencia)
- I due Foscari (2013, Teatro dell'Opera di Roma, Rome)

Theatre

- Varété (1992, Hebbel-Theater, Berlin)
- Floresta Amazonica (A Midsummer Night's Dream) (1992, Teatro João Caetano, Rio de Janeiro)
- Specialitaeten (1993, Etablissement Ronacher, Vienna)

Concerts

- The Killers: Unstaged (2012, Paradise Theater, New York City)

== See also ==
- List of German Academy Award winners and nominees
- List of atheists in film, radio, television and theater

== Works cited ==
- Werner Herzog. A Guide for the Perplexed: Conversations with Paul Cronin. London: Faber & Faber, 2014. ISBN 978-0-571-25977-9.
- Herzog, Werner; Cronin, Paul (2002). Herzog on Herzog. New York: Faber and Faber. ISBN 978-0-571-20708-4.
- Eric Ames, ed. Werner Herzog: Interviews. Jackson: University of Mississippi Press, 2014. ISBN 978-1-61703-969-0.
- Werner Herzog. Every Man for Himself and God Against All: A Memoir . Penguin Press, 2023. ISBN 978-0-59349-029-7.
- Emmanuel Carrère. Werner Herzog. Paris: Ediling, 1982. ISBN 2-85601-017-2
- Brad Prager. The Cinema of Werner Herzog: Aesthetic Ecstasy and Truth. New York: Wallflower Press, 2007. ISBN 978-1-905674-18-3.
- Eric Ames. Ferocious Reality. Documentary according to Werner Herzog. Minneapolis: University of Minnesota Press, 2012.
- Moritz Holfelder. Werner Herzog. Die Biografie. Munich: LangenMüller, 2012. ISBN 978-3-7844-3303-5.
- Brad Prager, ed. A Companion to Werner Herzog. Malden: Wiley-Blackwell, 2012. ISBN 978-1-405-19440-2.
- Richard Eldridge. Werner Herzog—Filmmaker and Philosopher. London: Bloomsbury, 2019. ISBN 978-1-350-10015-2.
- Kristoffer Hegnsvad. Werner Herzog – Ecstatic Truth and Other Useless Conquests. London: Reaktion, 2021. ISBN 978-1-789-14410-9.
- David LaRocca. Werner Herzog / Rogue Filmmaker. New York: Sticking Place Books, 2024. ISBN 978-1-942782-72-8.
