= Hero Found =

2010 non-fiction book by Bruce Henderson

Hero Found: The Greatest POW Escape of the Vietnam War
- First-edition cover
- Author: Bruce Henderson
- Language: English
- Genre: Biography
- Publisher: HarperCollins
- Publication date: June 29, 2010
- Publication place: United States
- Media type: Hardcover; Trade paperback E-book; Audiobook
- Pages: 320
- ISBN: 978-0-06-157136-7
- Website: http://brucehendersonbooks.com/

Hero Found: The Greatest POW Escape of the Vietnam War is a 2010 non-fiction book by author Bruce Henderson. Hero Found is a biography of Vietnam War hero Dieter Dengler, a German-born United States Navy naval aviator who endured six months of imprisonment and torture before being rescued. Dengler survived 23 days in the jungle after escaping from a Pathet Lao prison camp.

== Synopsis ==
Dieter Dengler's survival skills are established at an early age growing up in the chaos of World War II Germany. After his father is killed in the war, his mother teaches Dieter and his brothers how to survive on their own in the forest. Dieter learns what foods are safe to eat and how to find shelter from the elements. His lifelong love of aviation begins as he observes an Allied fighter fly past at tree-top level with the pilot wearing goggles and a white scarf. At sixteen, Dieter decides to move to America to become a pilot. Surviving on his wits and with little money, Dieter sails to New York City aboard SS America. He joins the U.S. Navy and becomes a naval aviator. After additional flight training, Dengler is assigned to VA-145 flying the Douglas A-1 Skyraider aboard USS Ranger (CV-61). In January 1966, Ranger reaches the coast of Vietnam to conduct combat operations.

On February 1, 1966, Dieter is shot down during a mission into Laos and crash-lands in a jungle clearing. A day later, he is captured by the Pathet Lao. Dieter is beaten by his captors and forced to march through the jungle for over a week. After refusing to sign papers denouncing the United States, he is beaten into unconsciousness. As the forced march continues, Dieter escapes but is recaptured and tortured. Two weeks after his crash-landing, Dieter arrives at a Prisoner of War (POW) camp having marched 85 miles. Here he meets other prisoners including Dwayne Martin, Prasit Thanee, Phisit Intharathat, To Yick Chiu, and Eugene DeBruin, some of whom have been imprisoned for two and a half years. The group endures illness, starvation, and brutal treatment waiting for the monsoon season when there will be enough water to sustain them during an escape. The rains do not come on time and conditions deteriorate at the camp to a point where the guards plan to kill the prisoners and return home. On June 29, 1966, the prisoners decide to attempt their escape. A fight ensues leaving many of the guards dead. The group splits up with Dieter and Dwayne marching into the forest toward Thailand. The monsoon rains start, but the pair are soon lost and gradually weaken as they struggle through the jungle. They surprise a villager who decapitates Dwayne with a machete. Dieter is pursued by the villagers and Pathet Lao but manages to avoid them. He continues to weaken and begins to hallucinate. Near the end of his strength, Dieter rests on a rock and sees a United States Air Force Skyraider flying towards him. Dieter signals the aircraft and is spotted by the pilot, Eugene Deatrick, who persists in calling a rescue despite the possibility that this could be a trap. On July 20, 1966, Dieter is finally rescued from his ordeal after 23 days in the jungle and six months after he was shot down.

Dieter is reunited with his comrades on Ranger and begins the long recovery to health. His story of survival and endurance is widely reported in the press and celebrated by the U.S. government. Dieter is awarded the Navy Cross for extraordinary heroism. He leaves military service and enjoys the life he so nearly lost. In 2000, Dieter is diagnosed with amyotrophic lateral sclerosis and gradually loses his mobility and ability to speak. Dieter tells his wife that the disease is worse than the prison camp in Laos. On February 7, 2001, Dieter commits suicide to escape from a disease that would cage him in his own body. In March 2001, Dieter is buried in Arlington National Cemetery with full military honors.

== Reviews ==
Hero Found received positive reviews. Kirkus Reviews called the book "a short but engaging tale of a harrowing POW experience." Publishers Weekly stated "This often riveting account sheds new light on an oft-told true story." Audiofile observed "Narrator Todd McLaren delivers the many scenes of aerial action and combat with enthusiasm and excitement. His animated involvement adds a special spark to a work already compelling from beginning to end."

== Release details ==
Hero Found was released in hardcover, paperback, e-book, and audiobook editions:

- Henderson, Bruce (2010). Hero Found: The Greatest POW Escape of the Vietnam War (Hard cover ed.). HarperCollins. p. 320. ISBN 978-0-06-157136-7.
- Henderson, Bruce (2011). Hero Found: The Greatest POW Escape of the Vietnam War (Paperback ed.). HarperCollins. p. 336. ISBN 978-0061571374.
- Henderson, Bruce (2010). Hero Found: The Greatest POW Escape of the Vietnam War (eBook ed.). HarperCollins. p. 332. ISBN 978-0061571367.
- Henderson, Bruce (author); McLaren, Todd (narrator) (2010). Hero Found: The Greatest POW Escape of the Vietnam War (Audiobook ed.). Tantor Audio. ISBN 978-1400147021.

== See also ==
- The Bamboo Cage—a book on Vietnam War POWs and MIAs that covers Dengler
- Little Dieter Needs to Fly—a 1997 documentary film about Dengler, written and directed by Werner Herzog
- Rescue Dawn—a 2006 war drama film about Dengler, directed by Werner Herzog, based on Little Dieter Needs to Fly
