= Dieter Dengler =

US Navy pilot and escaped POW (1938–2001)

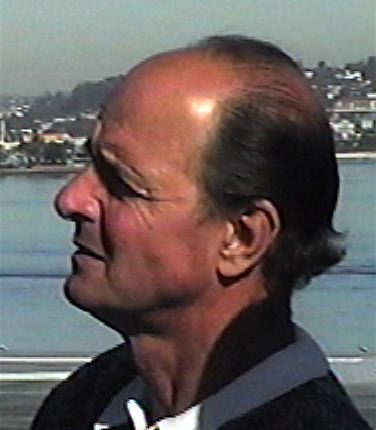
- Dieter Dengler tours the aircraft carrier USS Constellation in San Diego, California, on December 1, 1996.
- Born: Dieter Dengler; May 22, 1938; Wildberg, Württemberg, Germany
- Died: February 7, 2001 (aged 62); Mill Valley, California, United States
- Burial place: Arlington National Cemetery
- Military career
- Allegiance: United States
- Branch: United States Air Force; United States Navy
- Service years: 1957–1968
- Rank: Lieutenant
- Units: Attack Squadron 145, USS Ranger (CV-61)
- Conflicts: Vietnam War: Operation Flaming Dart
- Awards: Navy Cross; Distinguished Flying Cross; Bronze Star; Purple Heart; Air Medal; Navy Unit Commendation; Prisoner of War Medal

Dieter Dengler (May 22, 1938 – February 7, 2001) was a German-born United States Navy aviator who was shot down over Laos and captured during the Vietnam War. After six months of imprisonment and torture, and 23 days on the run, he became only the second captured US airman to escape during the war. Of the seven prisoners of war who escaped together from the Pathet Lao prison camp in Laos, only he and Thai citizen Phisit Intharathat survived. After the war, he worked as a test pilot for private aircraft and as a commercial airline pilot.

== Family and early life ==
Dengler was born and raised in the small town of Wildberg, in the Black Forest region of the German state of Württemberg. His father was drafted into the German Army in 1939 and was killed on the Eastern Front during the winter of 1943/1944. The family lived in extreme poverty; to survive, Dengler and his brothers scavenged scraps and leftovers from slaughtered sheep after neighbors' meals, and pulled down wallpaper adhered with wheatpaste from bombed-out buildings so their mother could boil it for nutrients. He became a blacksmith's apprentice at age 14 and was regularly beaten by the blacksmith and the other apprentices. Dengler later thanked the blacksmith for "his disciplined training," which taught him to be "more capable, self-reliant and... 'tough enough to survive'."

Dengler's maternal grandfather, Hermann Schnürle, refused to vote for Adolf Hitler and was subsequently paraded around town with a placard around his neck, was spat upon, and was sent to a rock mine to work as a labourer for a year. Dengler later credited his grandfather's resolve as a major inspiration while he was imprisoned in Laos and a factor in his refusal to sign a document penned by North Vietnam condemning American aggression in Southeast Asia.

== Military career ==
During World War II, Dengler saw an Allied fighter plane firing its guns as it flew through Wildberg; he credited this as the moment he knew he wanted to be a pilot. Years later, after seeing a call for pilots in an American magazine, he decided to travel to the United States. A family friend agreed to sponsor him and he salvaged brass and other metals to sell so he could pay for the rest of the passage. In 1956, upon turning 18 and completing his apprenticeship, Dengler hitchhiked to Hamburg and spent two weeks living on the street before leaving by ship to New York City. In the US, he spent a week homeless in Manhattan before finding an Air Force recruiter.

He enlisted in June 1957 and attended basic training at Lackland AFB in San Antonio, Texas. He spent the next two years peeling potatoes, then working as a mechanic for a motor pool. His qualifications as a machinist led to an assignment as a gunsmith. He passed the test for aviation cadets but was told that only college graduates were selected to be pilots and his enlistment expired before he was selected for pilot training. After his discharge, Dengler worked with his brother at a bakery near San Francisco. He enrolled in San Francisco City College, then transferred to the College of San Mateo to study aeronautics. After two years of college, he was accepted to the US Navy's Aviation Cadet Training Program. After finishing flight training, he trained as an attack aircraft pilot in the Douglas AD Skyraider at Naval Air Station in Corpus Christi, Texas. Following that training, he was assigned to Attack Squadron VA-145 and stationed at Naval Air Station in Alameda, California. In 1965, the squadron deployed on the carrier USS Ranger, departing Alameda for Vietnam in December. The carrier was initially positioned at Dixie Station in South Vietnam before moving north to Yankee Station.

Part of his training prior to deployment was Survival, Evasion, Resistance and Escape (SERE). During the training, Dengler escaped twice from the simulated POW camp and was planning a third by the end of the training cycle. Because of his experience living in poverty, he knew how to scavenge for food and ate scraps and garbage from the instructors' meals. He reportedly set a record as the only student to gain weight during the course.

=== 1966 capture and imprisonment ===
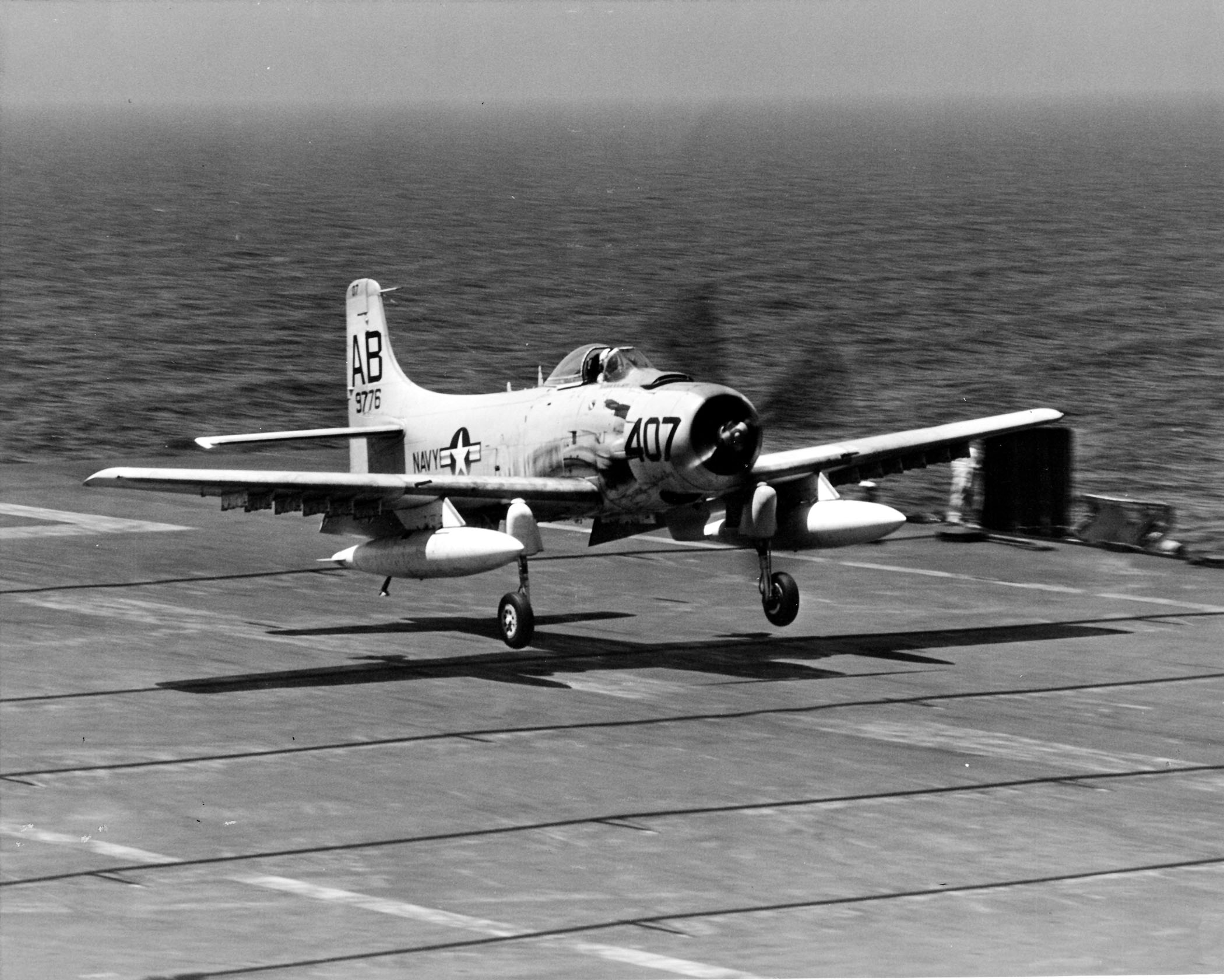
A Navy A-1 Skyraider from VA-15 catches a wire during carrier operations.

On February 1, 1966, the day after the carrier began flying missions from Yankee Station, LTJG Dengler departed the Ranger with three other aircraft on an interdiction mission against a North Vietnamese truck convoy. The pilots were forced to divert to their secondary target, a road intersection located west of the Mu Gia Pass in Laos, due to thunderstorms. US air operations in Laos at this time were classified. Visibility was poor due to smoke from burning fields and Dengler quickly lost sight of the other planes. After two-and-a-half hours of flying into enemy territory, the right wing was blown off his plane by anti-aircraft fire.

Immediately after being shot down, Dengler smashed his survival radio and hid most of his other survival equipment to keep enemy search parties from finding it. He was apprehended the next day by Pathet Lao troops. Dengler attempted to escape but was soon apprehended while drinking from a spring. Tortured as a punishment for escaping, Dengler was hung upside down from his ankles with a nest of biting ants converging on his face until he lost consciousness. He was then suspended in a well overnight so he would drown if he fell asleep. Dengler was also dragged through villages by a water buffalo. When he refused to sign a Pathet Lao document condemning the United States, slivers of bamboo were inserted under Dengler's fingernails and into incisions on his body.

Dengler was handed over to the Vietnamese and brought to a prison camp near the village of Par Kung. There, he met Thai prisoners of war Phisit Intharathat, Prasit Promsuwan, and Prasit Thanee; Chinese prisoner Y.C. To; and Americans Eugene DeBruin and Duane W. Martin. Except for Martin, a US Air Force helicopter pilot, the other prisoners were civilians employed by Air America, a civilian airline owned by the Central Intelligence Agency. By the time Dengler joined them, the civilians had all been held by the Pathet Lao for two and a half years. At night, the men were handcuffed together and shackled to wooden foot blocks. Due to toxic conditions in the water, they all suffered from chronic dysentery.

=== 1966 escape and rescue ===
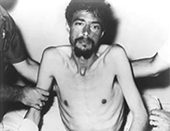
Dengler in the hospital after his rescue.

The other prisoners initially regarded Dengler's thick German accent and American allegiance with suspicion but eventually clued him in on their plans to escape. Shortly after, the group was moved to a new camp ten miles away at Hoi Het. There, the prisoners argued over whether they should attempt escape, with Dengler, Martin, and one of the Thai prisoners in favor of it and Intharathat initially opposed. After several months, during which they survived largely on a single handful of rice a day among the six of them, one of the Thai prisoners overheard the guards talking about shooting the group in the jungle and making it look like an escape attempt. As a result, the men unanimously agreed to try to escape. Their plan was to take over the camp and signal a C-130 Hercules flare ship that made nightly visits to the area. Dengler loosened logs under the hut to allow enough room for them to squeeze through.

On June 29, 1966, while the guards were eating, the prisoners slipped out of their restraints and seized the guards' unattended weapons, which included M1 rifles, Chinese automatic rifles, an American carbine, at least one submachine gun, and an early version of the AK-47. The men split into three groups: Dengler and Martin, DeBruin and To, and Intharathat, Promsuwan, and Thanee. They encountered at least five guards upon escaping the cell. Dengler and Martin began heading towards the Mekong River. With the exception of Intharathat, who was recaptured and later rescued, and DeBruin, who was reportedly recaptured before disappearing in 1968, none of the other prisoners were ever seen again.

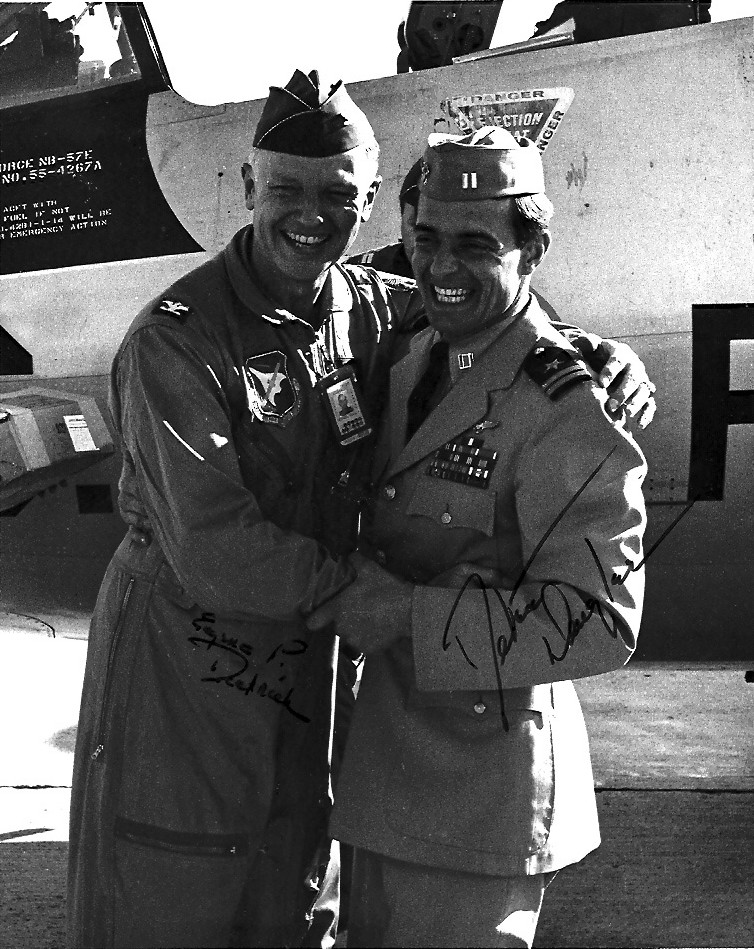
Dengler (right) with Eugene Deatrick, NAS Miramar, 1968.

Dengler and Martin found a fast-flowing river they believed fed into the Mekong and built a raft to escape. They stopped in the evening to rest and tied themselves to trees to avoid being washed away by the torrential water. The next morning, they realized that they had gone in a circle rather than towards the Mekong. They had spotted several villages but remained undetected and eventually set up camp in an abandoned village. Though they had brought rice and were able to scavenge for food, they were still on the verge of starvation and initially lacked the strength to start a fire. Dengler eventually managed to locate Martin's discarded carbine cartridges and used the powder to start the fire. When the C-130 flew overhead that evening, they waved lit torches to signal an SOS. The plane circled and dropped flares but no rescue team turned up. Not long after, Martin was decapitated with a machete by an Akha villager after being spotted by a child. Dengler escaped when the villager called for backup and evaded capture despite hallucinating vividly as a result of starvation. He returned to the abandoned village where he and Martin had camped and set the huts on fire to get the attention of the nightly C-130. The plane again dropped flares and though the crew reported their sighting to the Udorn Royal Thai Air Force Base, the fires were not recognized by intelligence as having been a signal from a survivor.

On July 20, 1966, after 23 days in the jungle, Dengler managed to catch the attention of a US Air Force pilot by using a parachute from one of the flares. Eugene Peyton Deatrick, the pilot of the lead plane and commander of the 1st Air Commando Squadron, spotted a flash of white while making a turn at the river's bend and backtracked. Deatrick and his wingman contacted rescue forces, but were told to ignore the sighting, as no airmen were known to be down in the area. He persisted and eventually managed to convince the command and control center to dispatch a rescue team.

Dengler was restrained by the helicopter crew as a precaution and strip searched to ensure he wasn't armed or in possession of a hand grenade. Deatrick reported Dengler's claim to be a POW and his identity was confirmed when they reached a hospital in Da Nang. There, a conflict developed between the Air Force and Navy over who would control his debriefing and recovery. The Navy sent a team of SEALs to recover Dengler from the Air Force recovery ward. A fight ensued between the SEALs and Air Force security police in which numerous Air Force personnel, including several patients, were badly beaten and injured. The SEAL team escaped unscathed and rushed Dengler to the air field on a gurney. He was returned to the USS Ranger and eventually airlifted to the US for medical treatment. At the time of his rescue, he stood at 5 ft 9 in (1.75 m) and weighed 98 pounds (44 kg).

=== Post-imprisonment ===
Dengler remained on Navy active duty for a year following his rescue. Promoted to Lieutenant, he went through Naval Air training school for jet operations before resigning his commission.

== Post-military career ==
As a civilian, he became an airline pilot for Trans World Airlines and survived four crashes as a test pilot. He returned to Laos in 1977, where the Pathet Lao welcomed him and took him to visit the camp from which he had escaped. Dengler retired as a commercial pilot sometime prior to 1985.

== Retirement, ALS, and suicide ==
After his retirement, Dengler continued flying for leisure in his restored Cessna 195 and became involved in air shows. In 2000, he was inducted into the Gathering of Eagles program and told the story of his escape to groups of young military officers. Dengler struggled with PTSD for the rest of his life. On February 7, 2001, after being diagnosed with Lou Gehrig's Disease (ALS), fearing he would turn into a “vegetable” he said his goodbyes and rolled his wheelchair from his house to a nearby fire station, where he shot himself. He was buried at Arlington National Cemetery and a Navy honor guard and a fly-over by Navy F-14 Tomcats were present at his burial.

Dengler was married three times: to Marina Adamich (1966–1970), to Irene Lam (1980–1984), and to Yukiko Dengler (1998–2001). Dengler was survived by sons Rolf, Alexander, and Ryan as well as three grandsons.

== In film and literature ==
Dengler was a contestant on the January 30, 1967 episode of I've Got a Secret, where his secret was that he escaped from a POW camp in Laos. The following year, he appeared on Hollywood Squares. He discussed issues pertaining to prisoners of war and soldiers missing in action in Christopher Olgiati's 1988 documentary We Can Keep You Forever. Dengler was the subject of Werner Herzog's 1997 documentary Little Dieter Needs to Fly. Herzog also directed Rescue Dawn, which starred Christian Bale as Dengler. It was shown at festivals at the end of 2006 and received a limited theatrical release in the USA on July 4, 2007, before the general release later that month. The film received criticism from members of Eugene DeBruin's family and from Phisit Intharathat, the other surviving member of the group. The film showed Dengler to be the primary mastermind behind the escape, meaning the roles of the rest of the prisoners were downplayed, despite the reality that Dengler was brought into the escape plans at least a month after his arrival in the prison camp. The portrayal of DeBruin was specifically criticized, as the film showed him to be delusional, unstable, and "sociopath[ic]," when friends, family, and the other prisoners characterized him as kind, intelligent, and a strong leader. Herzog later acknowledged that DeBruin acted heroically during his imprisonment but defended his choices, saying he took "artistic liberty" based in part on conversations with Dengler years before about the "antagonistic relationships among the prisoners when under extreme duress."

Dengler documented his experiences in Escape From Laos, a book published with Presidio Press in 1979. Nigel Cawthorne's 1990 book The Bamboo Cage: The Full Story of the American Servicemen Still Missing in Vietnam expanded on the information in We Can Keep You Forever. Dengler was the focus of Bruce Henderson's 2010 book Hero Found: The Greatest POW Escape of the Vietnam War. Henderson had served on the same aircraft carrier as Dengler at the time he was shot down.

== Awards and decorations ==
Dengler was the recipient of the following medals and decorations:

Badge	US Naval Aviator Insignia Badge		
1st row	Navy Cross		Distinguished Flying Cross
2nd row	Bronze Star with "V" device	Purple Heart	Air Medal
3rd row	Navy Unit Commendation	Prisoner of War Medal	National Defense Service Medal
4th row	Armed Forces Expeditionary Medal with 1 bronze Campaign star	Vietnam Service Medal with 1 bronze Campaign star	Gallantry Cross Unit Citation with palm and frame
5th row	Vietnam Campaign Medal with "60-" clasp	Navy Rifle Marksmanship Medal with Expert device	Navy Pistol Marksmanship Medal with Expert device
