= Raid on Ban Naden =

- Part of Laotian Civil War; Vietnam War
- Type: Covert rescue mission
- Location: Ban Naden, northern Laos
- Planned: Early December 1966
- Planned by: CIA
- Commanded by: Sergeant Te
- Objective: Free the prisoners of war held at Ban Naden
- Date: January 9, 1967; 0400 hours
- Executed by: Team Cobra; Supported by Air America, RLAF, and USAF
- Outcome: 82 prisoners rescued
- Casualties: 3 prison guards killed

The raid on Ban Naden of 9 January 1967 was a successful rescue of prisoners of war during the Vietnam War. The raid was improvised after local Central Intelligence Agency officers induced a Pathet Lao deserter to lead a rescue party back to the prison camp. At about 04:00 on 9 January 1967, a raiding party of 10 Lao mercenaries led by Sergeant Te killed or dispersed the communist guard force, only to discover twice as many rescuees as they had counted upon. Some of the captives immediately returned to their local homes, while the others followed their rescuers to an impromptu pickup zone in the midst of the Ho Chi Minh Trail. Hastily summoned Air America helicopters retrieved the raiders and the remaining prisoners, one of whom was Phisit Intharathat.

News of the raid was not released to the public or press. The operation is highly classified and used as an instructional case study in CIA training.

== Preliminaries ==
In late 1966, the Central Intelligence Agency (CIA) had human intelligence reports of three American prisoners of war being held in northern Laos. The names received matched American personnel records. Senior members of the CIA had contemplated an attempt to bribe prison guards however, this spooked the Communists and the prisoners were relocated. In early December 1966, a Pathet Lao defector was brought in to Thakhek, Laos by a CIA military intelligence team that was watching the Ho Chi Minh Trail. Under interrogation, the defector told of a prison camp in a cave near the Lao village of Ban Naden. It purportedly contained a captive Air America employee. In a year of picking up vague reports about this camp, this was the first detailed information. Debriefing elicited the information that there were about 40 guards at the camp, and about the same number of prisoners to be rescued.

Planning for a heli-borne rescue mission began immediately. However, that approach was quickly compromised in favor of a quiet final ground approach. The CIA recruited a Lao Theung sergeant who had been raised near Ban Naden. This ex-paratrooper was considered the best road watch team leader in the CIA's probes against the Ho Chi Minh Trail. Sergeant Te was given a free hand to pick operatives for his infiltration team. The chosen crew then trained for two weeks in tight security. Sergeant Te, his radioman, and the Pathet Lao defector were the only ones knowing the raid's destination.

== Raid ==
On 5 January 1967, the ten men of Team Cobra boarded Air America Sikorsky H-34 helicopters. The defector accompanied them. They were dropped in a clearing two days walk from Ban Naden. In the early morning hours of 7 January, they crept down a creek bed toward the prison camp. Although triple canopy jungle hindered aerial observation, the ground team could see a pair of cave mouths at the base of a 500-meter cliff face. As the cave entrances were six meters across, about 20 prisoners could be seen penned behind each set of bamboo bars. Two bamboo huts stood before the cave mouths. There were also holding cells sunk in the ground.

Team Cobra attacked at 04:00. They killed three guards, and drove the others away. Sergeant Te used bolt cutters to cut open chains lashing shut the bamboo bars. Phisit Intharathat, a former Thai commando, was released from one of the sunken cells. To Te's surprise, he found 82 prisoners instead of the expected 40. This overloaded the capacity of the arranged helilift extraction. An urgent radio call was forwarded through the relay aircraft orbiting overhead, appealing for more helicopters. Air America responded by waiving the usual two pilots per helicopter rule, and pulling helicopters out of maintenance. Even as the call went through, some of the released locals dispersed towards their homes.

Meanwhile, leading a party of released captives, Te headed for Route 12. It had become apparent that the party could not reach either of their planned extraction sites. The only possible alternative was in the middle of the Ho Chi Minh Trail, but morning traffic on the trail was rare. After crossing a stream and a hill, the party jogged along Route 12 into nearby mountains. The communist soldiers chasing them could be seen behind them. F-4 Phantoms attacked the pursuers before departing; then Royal Lao Air Force T-28s strafed and bombed the pursuit.

After gaining an open clearing guarded by friendly forces off Route 12 at about 17:00, the band of 53 escapees awaited rescue. Before rescue helicopters arrived, 22 more locals left to return to nearby relatives. Ignoring Air America policy forbidding night operations, Sikorsky H-34s swooped in and carried the rest to Savannakhet.

The Ban Naden raid was a successful rescue of prisoners of war during the Vietnam War. Although it is claimed that Thai Phisit Intharathat was the only non-Laotian released, there were Filipino employees of Air America among the rescued. Also released were the members of the CIA's road watch Team Juliet.

== Aftermath ==
CIA officer Thomas Fosmire debriefed Intharathat. Based on this information, the CIA not only increased its operations in the vicinity of the prisons in Military Region 3, but also changed their focus. Rather than passively watch the Ho Chi Minh Trail, locally recruited CIA teams now laid ambushes and called in air strikes on any target of opportunity.

An official account of the raid was never released to the media or the public. The Ban Naden raid has been classified, and is used in CIA officer training as a case study.

== See also ==
- Operation Ivory Coast for an account of the unsuccessful raid on Son Tay, North Vietnam.
- Laotian Civil War places Ban Naden raid in perspective of theater of operations
