= Duane W. Martin =

American prisoner of war during the Vietnam War

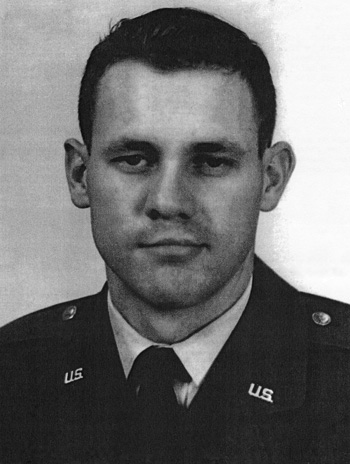
- Official picture of Duane Martin
- Born: January 2, 1940; Denver, Colorado, U.S.
- Died: July 16, 1966 (aged 26); North Vietnam or Laos
- Burial place: Unknown / Body not recovered
- Military career
- Branch: United States Air Force
- Service years: 1963–1966
- Rank: Captain
- Unit: 38th Rescue Squadron
- Conflicts: Vietnam War
- Awards: Air Force Cross; Distinguished Flying Cross; Purple Heart (2)

Duane Whitney Martin (January 2, 1940 – July 16, 1966) was an American Air Force officer and prisoner of war during the Vietnam War. He was killed by locals two and a half weeks after he and Dieter Dengler escaped from a Pathet Lao prison camp.

== Military career and capture ==
Martin became a commissioned officer in the United States Air Force on February 5, 1963 at Lackland AFB. He then completed undergraduate pilot training at Webb AFB on April 8, 1964 and helicopter pilot training on September 22. He served with a regiment at Portland International Airport before being assigned to Detachment 1 38th Aerospace Rescue and Recovery Squadron (38th ARRS), based at Nakhon Phanom Royal Thai Air Force Base, Thailand.

On September 20, 1965, while on a combat search and rescue (CSAR) mission over Tân An, Vietnam, 12 miles (19 km) from the Laos–Vietnam border, the Kaman HH-43 Huskie co-piloted by Martin was hit by ground fire and crashed into the jungle. Pilot Thomas J. Curtis, crew chief William A. Robinson, and pararescue specialist Arthur Black were captured by the North Vietnamese Army and later freed during Operation Homecoming. Martin, however, was captured by the Pathet Lao and taken to a POW camp in Laos.

There, he was kept with several Air America employees: American Eugene DeBruin; Thai citizens Phisit Intharathat, Prasit Promsuwan, and Prasit Thanee; and Chinese national To Yick Chiu. They were joined in February 1966 by German-born American pilot Dieter Dengler. After learning that the starving Pathet Lao guards planned on killing them and staging their bodies so that the killings looked like an escape, the prisoners decided to attempt an escape. On June 29, 1966, while the guards were eating, the group slipped out of their hand and foot restraints and grabbed the guards' unattended weapons. They encountered at least five guards. The seven prisoners split into three groups: Dengler and Martin, who headed for the Mekong River to escape to Thailand; Intharathat and the two other Thai prisoners; and DeBruin and To. To was too ill to continue with the escape and DeBruin elected to stay with him rather than go with Dengler and Martin.

Dengler and Martin found a fast-flowing river they believed fed into the Mekong and built a raft to escape. They stopped in the evening to rest and tied themselves to trees to avoid being washed away by the torrential water. The next morning, they realized that they had gone in a circle rather than towards the Mekong. They had spotted several villages but remained undetected and eventually set up camp in an abandoned village. Though they had brought rice and were able to scavenge for food, they were still on the verge of starvation. Martin had contracted malaria and Dengler had developed jaundice. Dengler eventually managed to locate Martin's discarded carbine cartridges and used the powder to start the fire. When a C-130 flew overhead that evening, they waved lit torches to signal an SOS. The plane circled and dropped flares but no rescue team turned up.

After 17 days on the run, Martin decided to try to steal food from a nearby Akha village. He was accompanied by Dengler despite Dengler's insistence that it would be suicide. The pair were spotted by a boy playing with a dog and were attacked by a machete-wielding villager after the boy cried out. Martin was killed after being hit in the leg and neck. Dengler managed to escape; he was the only survivor of the group aside from Intharathat. The other prisoners are still unaccounted for.

== Legacy ==
1st Lt. Martin was posthumously promoted to the rank of Captain. His name is listed on the Courts of the Missing at the National Memorial Cemetery of the Pacific in Honolulu, Hawaii. In the 2007 film Rescue Dawn, which told the story from Dengler's point of view, Martin was portrayed by actor Steve Zahn.

== Awards and honors ==

Martin's Air Force Cross citation acknowledged his "courageous action and devotion to duty... keeping with the highest traditions of the American fighting man under attack by an opposing armed force. Through his extraordinary heroism, superb airmanship, and aggressiveness in the face of hostile forces, First Lieutenant Martin reflected the highest credit upon himself and the United States Air Force."

U.S. Air Force Pilot Badge
Air Force Cross	Distinguished Flying Cross w/ Valor device	Purple Heart w/ 1 bronze oak leaf cluster
Air Force Commendation Medal	Air Force Presidential Unit Citation	Prisoner of War Medal
National Defense Service Medal	Vietnam Service Medal w/ 3 bronze campaign stars	Air Force Longevity Service Award
Small Arms Expert Marksmanship Ribbon	Republic of Vietnam Gallantry Cross Unit Citation	Vietnam Campaign Medal
