= Rescue Dawn =

2006 film by Werner Herzog

- Theatrical release poster
- Directed by: Werner Herzog
- Written by: Werner Herzog
- Produced by: Steve Marlton; Werner Herzog; Elton Brand; Harry Knapp; Nick N. Raslan
- Starring: Christian Bale; Steve Zahn; Jeremy Davies
- Cinematography: Peter Zeitlinger
- Edited by: Joe Bini
- Music by: Klaus Badelt
- Production companies: Metro-Goldwyn-Mayer Pictures; Top Gun Productions; Gibraltar Films; Thema Production
- Distributed by: MGM Distribution Co. (United States)
- Release dates: September 9, 2006 (TIFF); July 4, 2007 (United States)
- Running time: 125 minutes
- Countries: Luxembourg; United States
- Languages: English; Lao; Vietnamese
- Budget: $10 million
- Box office: $7.2 million

Rescue Dawn is a 2006 epic war drama film written and directed by Werner Herzog. It is based on the true story of Dieter Dengler, played by Christian Bale, a German-American pilot who was shot down and captured by villagers sympathetic to the Pathet Lao during an American military campaign in the Vietnam War. Steve Zahn, Jeremy Davies, and Toby Huss have prominent supporting roles in the film.

In 1997, Herzog made a documentary film about Dengler titled Little Dieter Needs to Fly. Rescue Dawn, which focuses on Dengler's experiences as a prisoner of war, began shooting in Thailand in August 2005. It received critical acclaim, but was a box office failure.

== Plot ==
In February 1966, while on a combat mission, Lieutenant Dieter Dengler, a German-born U.S. Navy pilot in squadron VA-145, flying from the carrier USS Ranger, is shot down in his Douglas A-1 Skyraider over Laos. He survives the crash, only to be captured by the Pathet Lao. Dengler is offered leniency by the province governor if he will sign a document condemning America, but he refuses, so he is tortured and taken to a prisoner of war camp. There, he meets his fellow prisoners, some of whom have been captives for years: American pilots Gene DeBruin and Duane W. Martin, Hong Kong Chinese radio operator Y. C. To, Thai Air America freight employee Phisit Intharathat, and Procet.

Dengler immediately plans to escape, but receives only grudging support from the other prisoners. All are suffering from malnutrition, unhygienic conditions, and abuse by the guards. After several months, the food supply worsens further, and the prisoners learn that the starving guards are planning to kill them and return to their homes, so they agree to put Dieter's long-prepared plan into action. This involves escaping through a weakened section of the perimeter fence, dividing into two groups, circling the perimeter fence in opposite directions, converging on the guard hut during the lunch hour to overwhelm the guards, and contacting the American forces for rescue.

Due to one party of prisoners disobeying Dengler's orders, the escape does not go according to plan, and nearly all the guards end up being shot. With insufficient equipment and supplies, the prisoners disperse in the jungle. Dengler and Martin form one group, while Gene and To leave together to an uncertain fate.

Dengler and Martin head towards the Mekong River with a plan to cross over into Thailand by fashioning a crude raft, but they run afoul of rapids and a waterfall. Martin gets progressively weaker as they wander through the jungle on foot, and, after Dengler fails to signal an American helicopter by starting a fire, he and Martin stumble into a small village, where a mob of angry villagers decapitate Martin. Dengler escapes and flees back into the jungle, hiding from the pursuing villagers. A few days later, he is finally rescued by an American helicopter and taken to a hospital in a U.S. compound, but kept isolated, as his mission was classified. Eventually, his squadron members are allowed to visit, and they arrange his escape back to his ship, where the whole crew welcomes him as a hero.

== Cast ==
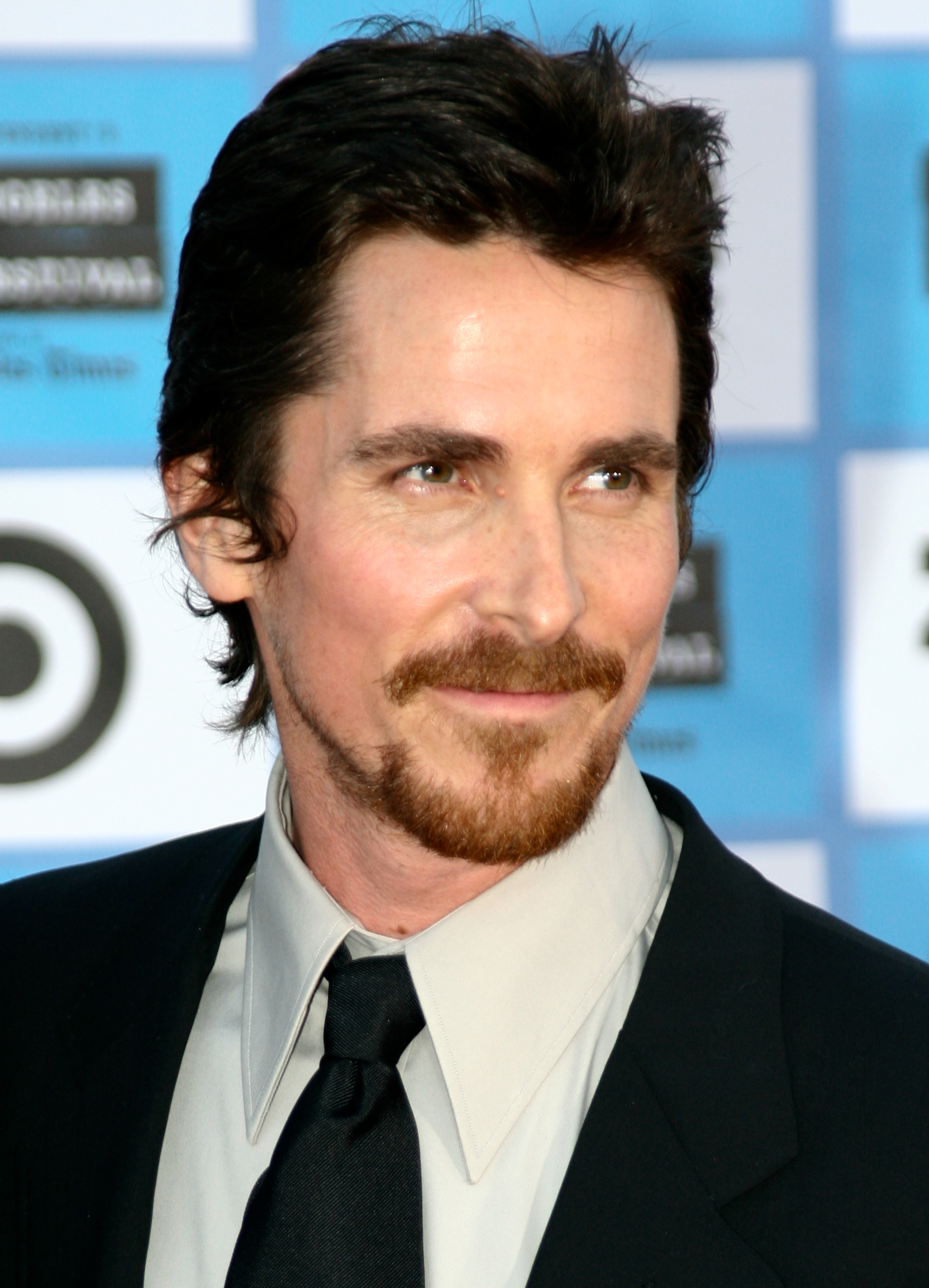
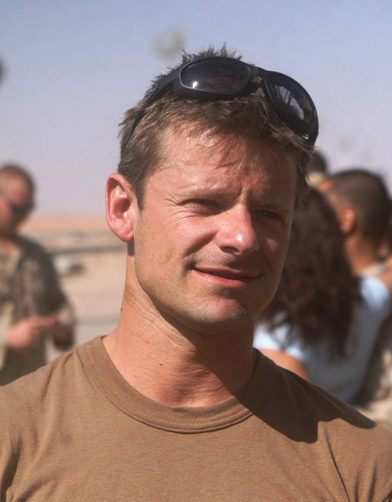
Christian Bale (left) and Steve Zahn (right) starred in the film
- Christian Bale as Lieutenant Dieter Dengler
- Steve Zahn as Lieutenant Duane Martin
- Jeremy Davies as Sergeant Gene DeBruin
- Zach Grenier as Squad Leader
- Marshall Bell as Admiral Berrington
- Toby Huss as Lieutenant Spook, Squadron Chief
- Pat Healy as Norman
- GQ (credited as Gregory J. Qaiyum) as Farkas
- Saichia Wongwiroj as Pathet Lao Guard
- François Chau as Province Governor
- Teerawat Mulvilai as Little Hitler
- Yuttana Muenwaja as Crazy Horse
- Kriangsak Ming-olo as Jumbo
- Somkuan "Kuan" Siroon as Nook the Rook
- Chorn Solyda as Walkie Talkie
- Galen Yuen as Y.C.
- Apichart Chusakul (credited as Abhijati "Muek" Jusakul) as Phisit Intharathat
- Lek Chaiyan Chunsuttiwat (credited as Chaiyan "Lek" Chunsuttiwat) as Procet
- Chris Tallman as DJ

== Production ==
=== Background and development ===
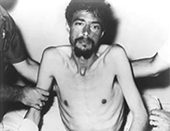
Dieter Dengler after his escape and rescue in 1966

Rescue Dawn is based on the true story of Dieter Dengler, a charismatic pilot who was shot down in Laos while on a covert attack mission for the United States Navy during the Vietnam War. A few months after being captured in 1966, Dengler and other POWs who were being held captive targeted July 4 for their mass escape. The prisoners had overheard the guards in mid-June planning to kill all of them and return to their villages because a drought had caused a severe shortage of food and water. The POWs decided they could not wait any longer to make their escape.

Dengler and fellow POW Duane W. Martin made their eventual run from their prisoner camp into dense jungle. Martin was killed by an enraged Laotian villager, but Dengler was able to continue on. Two rescue helicopters were scrambled to rescue Dengler, dropping a cable down to the human figure they spotted below. They winched him on board, but, fearful that he could be a Viet Cong suicide bomber, the pararescue crewman, A1C Michael Leonard from Lawler, Iowa, pinned Dengler to the helicopter floor and searched him. Dengler told Leonard that he was a Navy pilot who had been shot down and captured and recently escaped.

Herzog, fascinated by the cruelties of man and nature, became interested in Dengler's story and made the documentary Little Dieter Needs to Fly in 1997. When he chose to revisit the story in a cinematic theatrical version, he cast Christian Bale as Dengler. Before Bale's casting, Matt Damon was initially considered for the role of Dengler, but later turned it down. Compared to Little Dieter Needs to Fly, Rescue Dawn understates the suffering of the prisoners, including omitting some of the worst torture experienced by Dengler, as the film is rated PG-13.

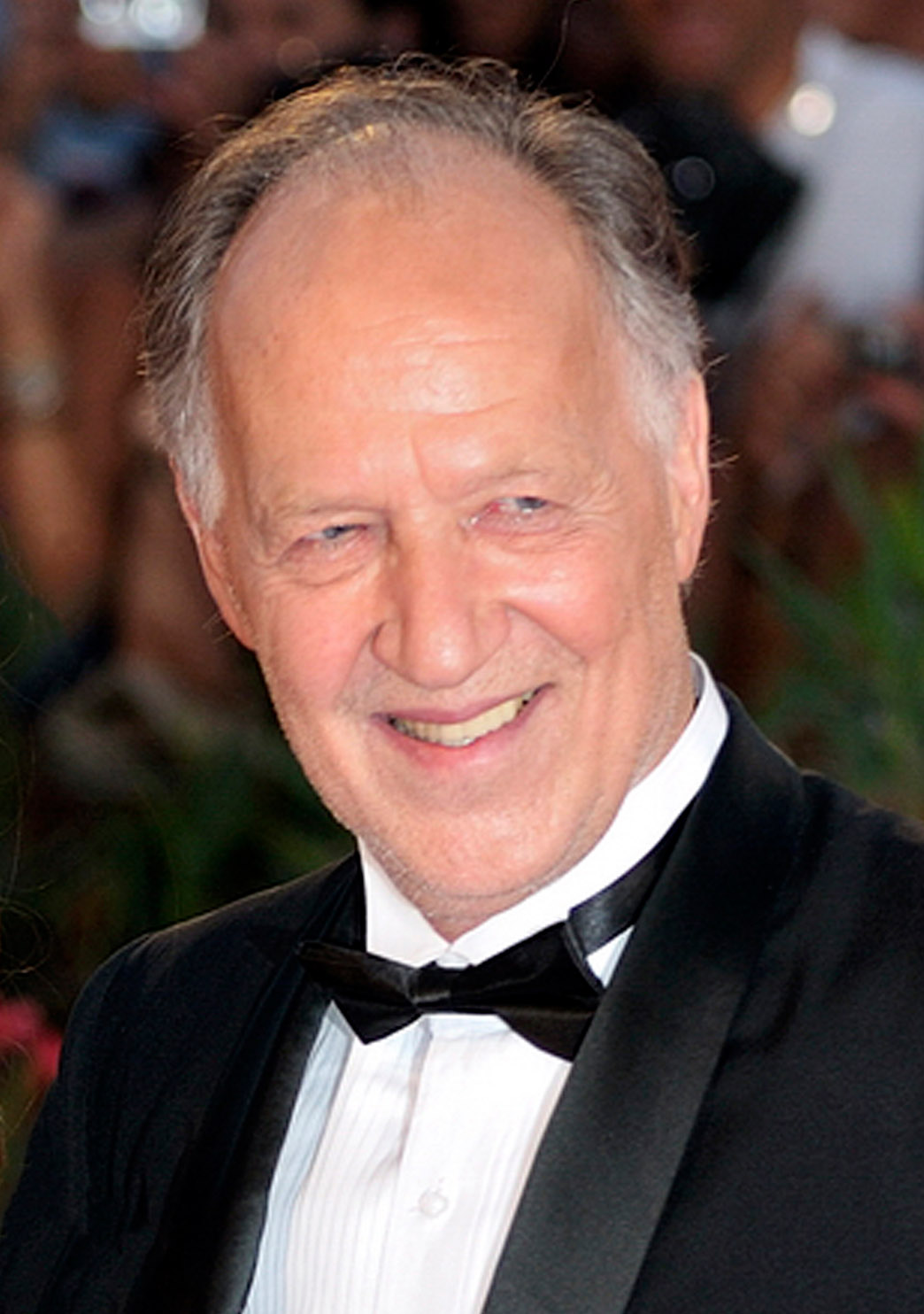
Director Werner Herzog

=== Filming ===
Principal photography took place over 44 days in Thailand. In preparation for their roles, the actors playing the prisoners spent several months losing weight. Since weight gain is accomplished more quickly than weight loss, the film was shot in reverse, with Bale fully regaining his weight over the course of the shoot. The film includes the first major use of digital visual effects in Herzog's career, as the shots of Dengler's flight were created digitally, though the crash is live action.

=== Music and soundtrack ===
The original motion picture soundtrack for Rescue Dawn was released by Milan Records on June 26, 2007. It features classical music, with considerable use of the cello and piano. The film's score was written by German composer Klaus Badelt, who had previously worked with Herzog on the 2001 film Invincible. Original songs written by musical artists Ernst Reijseger, Patty Hill, Craig Eastman, and Jack Shaindlin, among others, were also used in the film. Peter Austin edited the music.

Track listing:

1. "Dieter's Theme" – 3:23
2. "Journey" – 1:22
3. "Hope" – 5:28
4. "Sign This" – 1:33
5. "Gathering Rice" – 1:48
6. "The Plan" – 2:24
7. "After The Fire" – 1:56
8. "Rain" – 2:58
9. "Operation Rescue Dawn" – 2:43
10. "It's Him" – 4:07
11. "Keep Your Head Down" – 0:54
12. "America Gave Me Wings" – 1:58
13. "Mirror" – 1:46
14. "Sleepwalkers" – 2:42
15. "Rescue" – 4:45
16. "Lights (Rescue Dawn Version)" – 4:20
17. "Dieter's Theme Reprise" – 1:49
18. "This Is How I Remember Him" – 2:35

== Historical accuracy ==
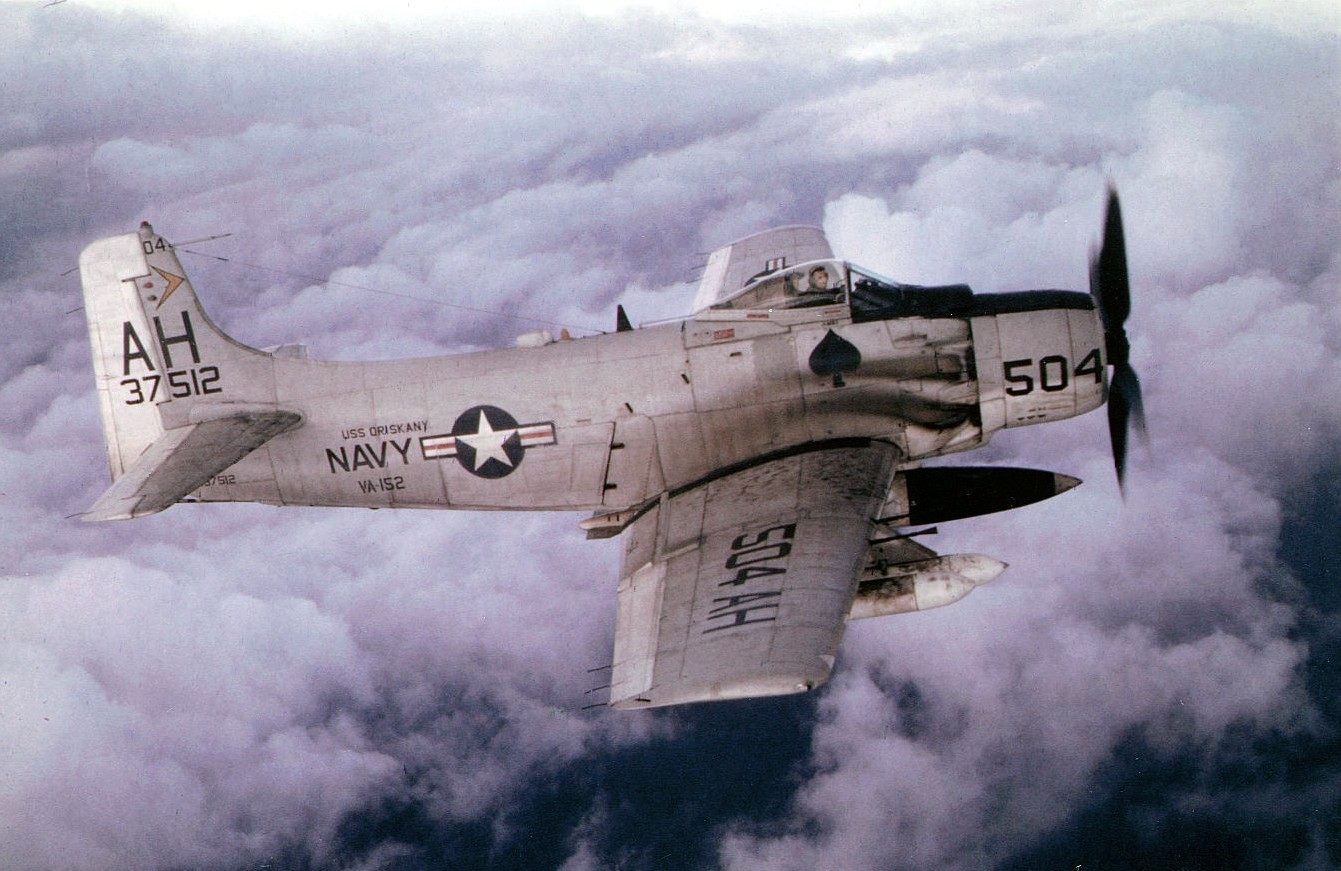
Dengler flew an A-1 Skyraider aircraft.

In real life, Dengler spoke English with a heavy German accent, which was reduced in Bale's portrayal "to almost zero".

The film depicts six total prisoners in Dengler's camp, while in real life there were seven. Herzog said he found the writing to be difficult with seven characters, and six was a more manageable number.

Jerry DeBruin, brother of Gene DeBruin, created a website critical of Herzog and the film on which he claimed that several characters and events in the film are falsely portrayed. On the same website, Phisit Intharathat, the only survivor of Dengler's group of prisoners other than Dengler, also stated that the film contains inaccuracies. The site claims that during his imprisonment, DeBruin taught his cellmates English, shared his food, and even returned after escaping to help an injured cellmate. In the film, Dengler formulates the entire escape plan, along with uncuffing the prisoners' handcuffs with a nail. According to Jerry DeBruin, the prisoners waited for two weeks before telling him of the plan, which had been devised before his arrival.

Herzog acknowledged that DeBruin acted heroically during his imprisonment, refusing to leave while some sick prisoners remained, and probably would have written the character differently, but he was unaware of this information until after the film had been completed. Intharathat and Jerry DeBruin stated that they made multiple attempts to meet with Herzog to ensure the film's accuracy, but without success.

== Release ==
Rescue Dawn was distributed by Metro-Goldwyn-Mayer theatrically in the United States, and by Pathé Distribution, Hopscotch Films, and Central Film GmbH in foreign markets. It was originally scheduled to be released in the U.S. by MGM in December 2006, but was held back until 2007, with a limited release in New York City, Toronto, and Los Angeles on July 4, and a wide release on July 27.

=== Home media ===
The film was released on DVD and Blu-ray on November 20, 2007. According to the website The Numbers, it has earned an estimated $25,361,799 from DVD sales in the United States.

== Reception ==
=== Box office ===
During its 17-week theatrical run, the film grossed $5,490,423 in the U.S. and Canada and $1,686,720 in other territories, for a total theatrical gross of $7,177,143. It ranked 178th at the 2007 box office. The film was considered a financial failure due to its $10 million budget, but was able to recoup its losses from DVD rentals and sales.

Opening in six locations in the United States on July 4, 2007, the film grossed $110,326 its opening weekend. After expanding to 500 theaters on July 24, it earned $1,650,282, enough to finish in a distant 11th place at the weekend box office. The film's revenue dropped by 66% its second week in wide release, earning $560,903 and falling to 18th place.

=== Critical response ===
Preceding its theatrical run, Rescue Dawn received generally positive critical reviews. On the film review aggregator website Rotten Tomatoes, 90% of 162 critics' reviews of the film are positive, with an average rating of 7.5/10; the site's "critics consensus" reads: "Director Werner Herzog has once again made a compelling tale of man versus nature, and Christian Bale completely immerses himself in the role of fighter pilot (and prisoner of war) Dieter Dengler." On Metacritic the film has a weighted average score of 77 out of 100 based on reviews from 36 critics, indicating "generally favorable" reviews.

"In Rescue Dawn, filmed in the jungles of Thailand, there is never the slightest doubt we are in the jungle. No movie stars creeping behind potted shrubbery on a back lot. The screen always looks wet and green, and the actors push through the choking vegetation with difficulty. We can almost smell the rot and humidity."
—Roger Ebert, writing in the Chicago Sun-Times

Kirk Honeycutt, writing in The Hollywood Reporter, said actor Bale's performance was "most complex and compelling". He praised Herzog for his use of "lush jungle locations in Thailand, eloquent camera work and an unobtrusive but powerful music score", which brought to life the "story of a man in the wilderness battling the elements on his own terms".

Roger Ebert of the Chicago Sun-Times called Rescue Dawn "perhaps the most believable [movie] that Herzog has made", while exclaiming: "There is nothing in it we cannot, or do not, believe. I was almost prepared to compare it to the classic storytelling of John Huston when I realized it had crucial Herzogian differences".

In the San Francisco Chronicle, Walter Addiego wrote that the film was "an old-fashioned prisoner-of-war movie that becomes much more because of writer-director Werner Herzog's admiration for the remarkable true story of its protagonist, Dieter Dengler". He thought the director "found an actor capable of conveying the Herzog-ian hero—wounded, a holy fool, a crackpot, a dreamer of outsized dreams—in everyone."

Scott Bowles of USA Today said the film was "cold and unforgiving and chilling to behold". He declared: "War stories don't get much more harrowing or detached than Rescue Dawn, and that's both blessing and curse for the Werner Herzog film."

The film was not without its detractors, however. Rick Groen of The Globe and Mail, felt that "The strangely hybrid result, half Herzog and half Hollywood, plays like its own battleground. Sometimes, the tension is fascinatingly productive; other times, all we get is the worst of both worlds". Equally unimpressed was Paula Nechak of the Seattle Post-Intelligencer, who called Rescue Dawn "a noble effort that can't quite make itself unique in a saturated genre", adding that Herzog "already has covered much of the tropical terrain of his long-delayed action film in his 1997 documentary Little Dieter Needs To Fly". Alternatively, J. Hoberman of The Village Voice, said the film "rivals Apocalypto as a jungle marathon, has all this and more". He also noted that "Bale even looks authentically starved (as in The Machinist). But seeing Dengler's adventure staged hardly seems more real than hearing his account—although, as conventionally framed and lit as it is, Rescue Dawn is the closest thing to a 'real' movie that Herzog has ever made."

Writing for The New York Times, Matt Zoller Seitz said the "story’s basis in fact doesn’t inoculate it against charges of predictability. Klaus Badelt’s score can be intrusively emphatic. And the triumphant ending—in which Dengler is welcomed back to his carrier with applause and speeches—is disappointingly conventional". Overall though, he did commend the film, stating, "'Rescue Dawn' is a marvel: a satisfying genre picture that challenges the viewer’s expectations".

James Berardinelli, writing for ReelViews, called Rescue Dawn "a solid effort from Herzog that fans of the genre should actively seek out" and noted that "Herzog understood when he made Little Dieter Needs to Fly that the ex-pilot's story would make an excellent feature. It's surprising it has taken him so long to make that movie." Berardinelli also commented that "Christian Bale continues to amaze with his ability and range. He may be the most versatile under-40 performer today. No role seems to be beyond him, and he has worked with some of the best directors of his era".

Describing some pitfalls, Elizabeth Weitzman of the NY Daily News said there was "an odd emotional disconnect leading up to the climactic escape, which can be traced directly to the performances". Although quick to admit that "Herzog builds suspense from the start, and the movie is shot spectacularly", ultimately, Weitzman was disappointed, saying: "There is a great movie in Werner Herzog's Vietnam saga, Rescue Dawn. Unfortunately, it's about 30 minutes too long. Although the rest of this based-on-truth adventure is woven with powerful moments, only toward the end will it hold you completely in its grip."

"In a story that begs for some introspection and understanding of what is going on inside its lead character, this Dieter has only the Tom Cruise cockiness that made Top Gun such an iconic experience for filmgoers in the '80s. But by now we've seen the formulaic pattern again and again in summer blockbusters ..."
—Paula Nechak, writing in the Seattle Post-Intelligencer

Ann Hornaday of The Washington Post called Rescue Dawn "an original addition to the war film canon. It's an instant classic of the form, a portrait of courage and sacrifice at their most stirring, but subversively resisting cant and cliche". She believed that "such a masterful depiction of American heroism and can-do spirit has been created by a German art film director known for considerably darker visions of obsession is an irony Herzog no doubt finds delicious", and also emphasized how "There's a sense of austerity underlying Rescue Dawn, all the more admirable for being so rare in Hollywood storytelling." Similarly, David Ansen wrote in Newsweek that "Rescue Dawn is a Werner Herzog movie (and a true story), and though it's as taut and exciting as many edge-of-your-seat Hollywood escape movies, there's a mania about Dieter that sets him apart, a wild-eyed bravado that suggests the line between bravery and complete lunacy is a thin one."

Michael Phillips of the Chicago Tribune, however, was not moved by the storytelling, writing: "Rescue Dawn is Herzog's first English-language screenplay, and this is part of its problem: The hushed conversations between prisoners sound only fitfully idiomatic. Also – crucially – Herzog can't find a way to make his own big finish feel authentic, even if things did happen roughly this way." On the other hand, critic Leonard Maltin praised the film, which he called a "Gripping reworking of Herzog's 1997 documentary Little Dieter Needs to Fly", and an "edge-of-your-seat POW story".

Various critics included the film on their lists of the top 10 best films of the year, such as V. A. Musetto of the New York Post, who called it one of the best films of 2007.

=== Accolades ===
For their performances in the film, Bale and Zahn were nominated for multiple awards, including, respectively, at the Golden Satellite Awards and the Independent Spirit Awards. Bale won an award from the San Diego Film Critics Society for his "body of work" in 2007, which included this film, as well as 3:10 to Yuma and I'm Not There.

== Bibliography ==
- Anton, Frank. Why Didn't You Get Me Out?: A POW's Nightmare in Vietnam. New York: St. Martin's Press, 2000. ISBN 978-0-312-97488-6.
- Bailey, Lawrence. Solitary Survivor: The First American POW in Southeast Asia. Lincoln, Nebraska: Potomac Books, 2003. ISBN 978-1-57488-602-3.
- Dengler, Dieter. Escape From Laos. New York: Presidio Press: 1997 ISBN 978-0-89141-293-9.
- Henderson, Bruce. Hero Found: The Greatest POW Escape of the Vietnam War. New York: Harper, 2010. ISBN 978-0-06-157136-7.
- Maltin, Leonard. Leonard Maltin's 2009 Movie Guide. New York: Signet, 2008. ISBN 978-0-452-28978-9.
- Prager, Brad.The Cinema of Werner Herzog: Aesthetic Ecstasy and Truth. New York: Wallflower Press, 2007. ISBN 978-1-905674-18-3.
- Rowe, James. Five Years to Freedom: The True Story of a Vietnam POW. New York: Presidio Press, 1984 ISBN 978-0-345-31460-4.
- Wilms, Wilfried. Bombs Away! Representing the Air War over Europe and Japan. Amsterdam, the Netherlands: Rodopi, 2006. ISBN 978-90-420-1759-7.
