= Bruce Henderson (author) =

American journalist and author

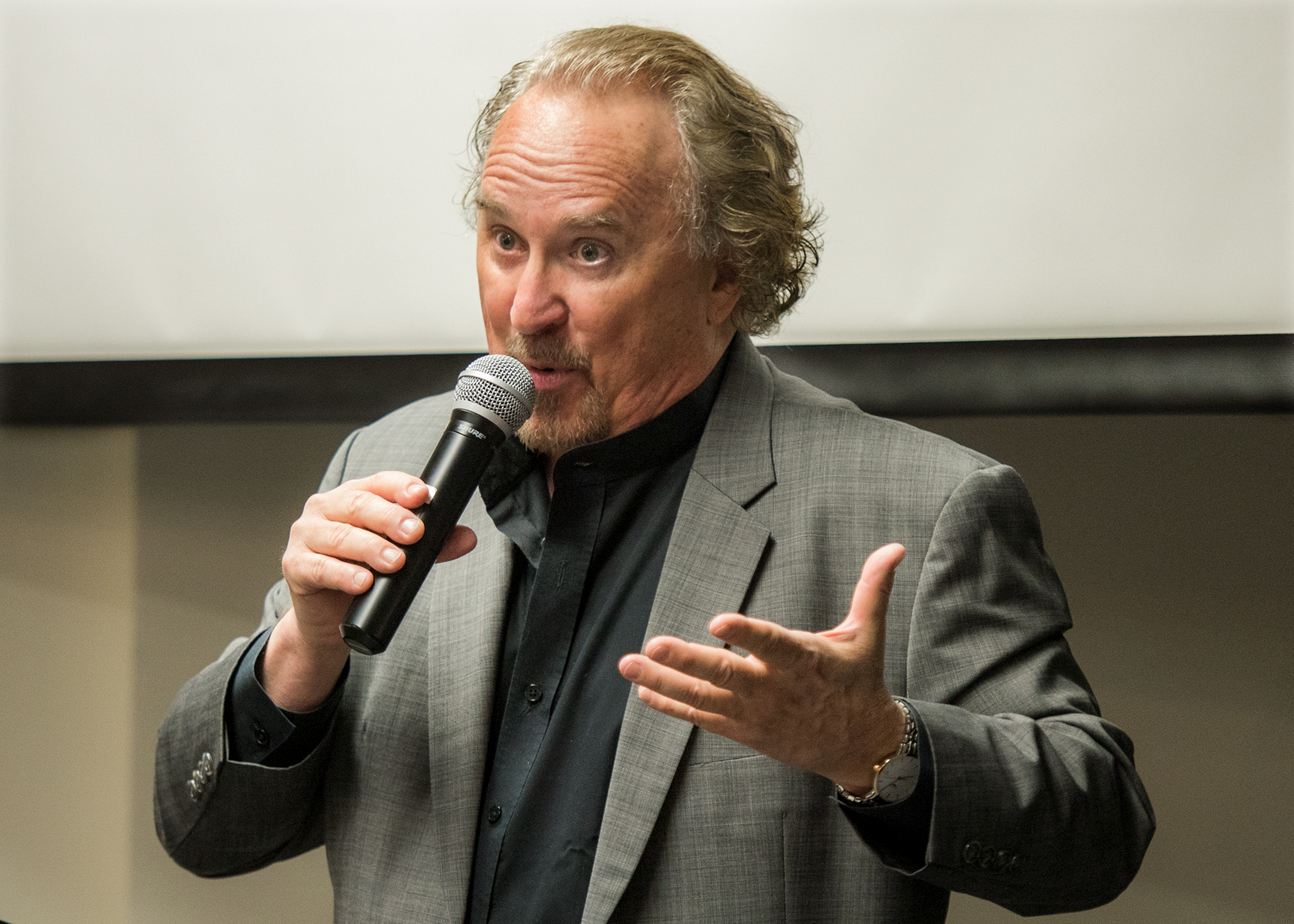
Image of Bruce Henderson

Bruce Henderson is an American journalist and author of more than twenty nonfiction books, including the #1 New York Times bestseller, And the Sea Will Tell. His most recent New York Times bestseller is Sons and Soldiers: The Untold Story of the Jews Who Escaped the Nazis and Returned with the U.S. Army to Fight Hitler. Henderson's books have been translated into more than a dozen languages, including French, Spanish, Italian, Portuguese, Danish, Dutch, Chinese, Japanese, Hungarian and Czech. Henderson won the Tenth Annual Gilder Lehrman Military History Prize in recognition of "the best English language book published in 2022 in the field of American military history" for Bridge to the Sun: The Secret Role of the Japanese Americans Who Fought in the Pacific in World War II (Knopf). A member of the Authors Guild, Henderson has taught reporting and writing courses at USC School of Journalism and Stanford University.

Born in Oakland in 1952 and raised in nearby Alameda, California, he served in the United States Navy during the Vietnam War and attended college on the G.I. Bill. He worked as an investigative reporter for several newspapers, including the Los Angeles Herald-Examiner, and was an associate editor at New West and California magazines. His work has appeared in many other periodicals, such as Smithsonian Magazine ("Cook vs. Peary", April 2009), Esquire, and Playboy.

== Other notable books ==
Henderson's 2018 New York Times bestseller Sons and Soldiers: The Untold Story of the Jews Who Escaped the Nazis and Returned with the U.S. Army to Fight Hitler, is the true story of the German-born Jews, dubbed the Ritchie Boys, who fled Nazi Germany in the 1930s, came of age in America, and returned to Europe at enormous personal risk as members of the U.S. Army's Military Intelligence Service to play a key role in the Allied victory. Sons and Soldiers has been published in twelve foreign countries. USA Today called it "thrilling...a spellbinding account of extraordinary men at war".

Henderson's national bestseller Hero Found: The Greatest POW Escape of the Vietnam War is the story of U.S. Navy pilot Dieter Dengler, who was shot down over Laos and escaped from a Pathet Lao POW camp six months later. On a similar topic, Henderson also wrote Rescue at Los Baños: The Most Daring Prison Camp Raid of World War II, a narrative nonfiction account of the February 23, 1945, Raid at Los Baños that freed more than 2,000 civilian prisoners of war – most of them American men, women and children, as well as other Allied nationalities – from an Imperial Japanese Army internment camp located 40 miles south of Manila. Rescue at Los Baños has received positive reviews from the trade and the media. Kirkus Reviews called it "riveting."

His true crime book And the Sea Will Tell, a collaboration with Charles Manson prosecutor Vincent Bugliosi, was a #1 New York Times hardcover bestseller and highly rated CBS miniseries. "The book succeeds on all counts", reported the Los Angeles Times on February 17, 1991. "The final pages are some of the most suspenseful in trial literature." Henderson followed with another true crime title, Trace Evidence: The Hunt for the I-5 Serial Killer.

Henderson's book True North: Peary, Cook, and The Race to the Pole examined the ongoing controversy as to which explorer reached the North Pole first: Robert Peary in 1909 or Frederick Cook in 1908. Publishers Weekly commented: "This adventure yarn delivers as both a cautionary tale and a fitting memorial to polar exploration." Henderson's other Arctic title, Fatal North: Murder and Survival on the First North Pole Expedition, tells the story of the ill-fated Charles Francis Hall expedition to the North Pole.

Henderson co-authored Time Traveler: A Scientist's Personal Mission to Make Time Travel a Reality, the autobiography of African-American theoretical physicist Ronald Mallett, and Ring of Deceit: Inside the Biggest Sports and Bank Scandal in History, which chronicles the meteoric rise and fall of boxing promoter and convicted swindler Harold Smith.

== Partial bibliography ==
- Sons and Soldiers: The Untold Story of the Jews Who Escaped the Nazis and Returned with the U.S. Army to Fight Hitler (ISBN 978-0-06-241909-5)
- Bridge to the Sun: The Secret Role of the Japanese Americans Who Fought in the Pacific in World War II (ISBN 978-0-52-5655817)
- Rescue at Los Baños: The Most Daring Prison Camp Raid of World War II (ISBN 978-0-06-232506-8)
- Hero Found: The Greatest POW Escape of the Vietnam War (ISBN 978-0-06-157137-4)
- Midnight Flyboys: The American Bombers Crews and Allied Secret Agents Who Aided the French Resistance in World War II (ISBN 978-1-6680-5141-2)
- Down to the Sea: An Epic Story of Naval Disaster and Heroism in World War II (ISBN 978-0-06-117316-5)
- Trace Evidence: The Hunt for an Elusive Serial Killer (ISBN 978-0989467513)
- Fatal North: Murder and Survival on the First North Pole Expedition (ISBN 978-0989467544)
- True North: Peary, Cook, and The Race to the Pole (ISBN 0-393-05791-7)
- Ghetto Cops: On the Streets of the Most Dangerous City in America (ISBN 978-0-9894675-5-1)
- Ring of Deceit: Inside the Biggest Sports and Bank Scandal in History (ISBN 978-1-63064-021-7)
- Time Traveler: A Scientist's Personal Mission to Make Time Travel a Reality (ISBN 978-1-56858-363-1)
- Spy Dust: Two Masters of Disguise Reveal the Tools and Operations That Helped Win the Cold War (ISBN 0-7434-2852-8)
- Leap of Faith: An Astronaut's Journey into the Unknown (ISBN 0-06-019416-2)
- Taking Back Our Streets: Fighting Crime in America (ISBN 0-684-80277-5)
- Ernest & Julio: Our Story (ISBN 0-8129-2454-1)

== Film adaptations ==
Sons and Soldiers is being developed for a feature film. Time Traveler is also under option. And the Sea Will Tell was made into a four-hour CBS movie, starring Rachel Ward, Richard Crenna, and James Brolin. Ring of Deceit is being adapted for film.
