= Boun Oum Airways =

Laotian airline 1964–1967

- Founded: 1964
- Ceased operations: 1967
- Key people: Prince Boun Oum, founder

Boun Oum Airways or BOA, was a Laotian airline owned by Prince Boun Oum and operated by the US The CIA. After 1965 BOA expanded using aircraft on loan from Continental Air Services, Inc (CASI). BOA's aircraft did not carry any logo or titles and their Thai pilots were integrated with CASI by early 1967.

== History ==
The CIA created BOA in 1964 by using resources from both Air America and Bird & Son. BOA was ostensibly owned by Prince Boun Oum of Laos and was created with the intention of flying missions in Laos with Asian crews (as opposed to Caucasian crews) allegedly for plausible deniability. BOA was based at Savannakhet, Laos.

Due to its high aircraft loss rate, BOA was fully integrated into the CASI by mid-1967 and officially ceased to exist.

== Incidents ==
- Boum Oum Airlines (sic) reportedly lost two Dornier Do 28s on 12/03/67 and in 05/67.
- November 1964, a Bell 47G-3B-1 Sioux helicopter crashed on its first mission.
- December 1965, a C-47 crashed after takeoff from Vientiane.
- April 1966, a C-47 disappeared while dropping supplies near Ban Song, a town in Surat Thani Province, Thailand.
- In 1967, a Do-28 flown by a CASI pilot, C.V. Stone crashed into a hangar on take-off.
- May 1967, a Dornier Do-28s was lost in a heavy rainstorm near Mahaxay, Laos, while dropping supplies.

== Aircraft ==
- Beech Tradewind x 1
- Bell 47G-3B-1 x 1
- Dornier Do 28 x 2
- Douglas C-47s x 2
- Helio Courier x 1
- Piper PA-18 Super Cubs x 2
