= Phisit Intharathat =

Thai citizen

Phisit Intharathat (Thai: พิสิษฐ์ อินทรทัต, sometimes translated as Pisidhi Indradat) is a Thai citizen who was retrieved during a successful prisoner of war rescue of the Vietnam War. After service as a commando in the Thai Border Patrol Police Parachute Aerial Resupply Unit, he went to work as a civilian with Air America during the Laotian Civil War.

On 5 September 1963, he was a member of a Curtiss C-46 Commando air crew shot down near Ban Houei Sane, Laos. He was held in nine jungle prisons while the Vietnam War officially began. After two escape attempts, including one spell of 32 days spent starving in the jungle, he was still struggling to flee when rescued by the Ban Naden raid of 5 January 1967. He returned to work for Air America until they departed from Southeast Asia. After working for a Bangkok company, he retired there.

== Background ==
Phisit Intharathat trained and served as a paratrooper in his native Thailand's Border Patrol Police. Members of James William Lair's Police Aerial Resupply Unit received Special forces training as commandos. After that experience, he found employment with Air America as a cargo handler on refugee relief missions dropping rice and other supplies into the Kingdom of Laos. On 4 September 1963, as part of Laotian Civil War operations, he was scheduled to fly such missions the following day with his usual flight crew on a Curtiss C-46 Commando. One of them had a hunch that he should not fly this schedule; he resigned that night. Prasit Thanee replaced him the following morning. Later, upon the death of his mother, Intharathat wrote an account of this flight and his imprisonment.

== Mission ==
On 5 September 1963, Phisit took off from Vientiane on a flight to Savannakhet Province in Laos, with fellow Thais Prasit Promsuwan and Prasit Thanee, Chinese Y.C. To, and Americans Eugene DeBruin, Joseph C. Cheney and Charles Herrick. At Savannakhet Airport, they loaded up and took off for their resupply drop near Ban Houei Sane, Laos. On their second drop, a 300 kilo sack of rice struck the left tail fin on its way to the ground. After a nervous return flight, mechanics checked the aircraft for damage, and passed it as safe to fly. By this time, it was nearly 16:00. The crew loaded up; they had time enough for their third and final drop before sunset. Phisit notes it was a routine day, no different from others of his thousands of flying hours in Laos.

During this flight, about ten minutes shy of the drop zone, while flying at 8,000 feet, the C-46 was hit by antiaircraft fire and its right engine caught fire. Because Phisit was an experienced parachutist, he hurried to help inexperienced crew members bail out of the stricken plane. DeBruin, Y.C. To, and the three Thai nationals parachuted to safety. Cheney and Herrick were killed in the crash.

== Capture ==
Because Phisit bailed out last, after failing to convince Cheney and Herrick to abandon the C-46's controls, he left the falling plane at a lower altitude than the others. He could see the others above him, drifting toward "a plain". He ended his 80th parachute jump when he landed in a tree just shy of 16:30. Although he was suffering from a knee injury, he was optimistic about help because combat search and rescue was available until 18:00. He moved from the crash site, going about 100 meters into the jungle. He bandaged his knee while hiding in a tree. At 17:45, four Royal Lao Air Force AT-6s flew over his abandoned parachute before turning away from ground fire. It began to rain.

Later, he saw and heard a platoon of soldiers; they spoke both Lao and Vietnamese. When they located Phisit's parachute, they spread out to search for him. In turn, Phisit sneaked off down a lightly used trail, moving through increasing rain and oncoming dusk. After circling a hamlet containing enemy soldiers, he took to a creek, riding a log downstream. Unfortunately, he floated down upon a bonfire on the bank; five hostile local villagers sat next to it. Two of them detained him at musket point until Pathet Lao soldiers arrived. They tied his hands behind his back and led him by a noose around his neck. He was reunited with his four friends from the flight crew, and they began their imprisonment. Phisit spent the next three years, four months, and four days in a series of nine jungle prisons.

== Prisons and escapes ==
=== Prison number one ===
After about 08:00 on 6 September, the three Thai prisoners were beaten and asked inconsequential questions. They were then marched down Route 9 and locked in an old building surrounded by a brick wall. The air crew was held there 27 days on two meals per day chased by a cup of water. Here Phisit cleaned the severe infection out of his knee wound with a sharpened bamboo splinter.

=== Prison number two ===
After a three-day march down Route 9, the air crew was locked into an unshaded tin-roofed cubicle. They continued to be fed two cups of sticky rice daily. In desperation, they killed and ate a snake and the two mice it was swallowing. After a month, all the prisoners suffered from dysentery. They spent three months in this jail.

=== Muang Ang Kham Prison ===
Phisit and the others were marched five hours to the next prison, which was near the Vietnamese border. Here they were confined in a log jail while locked in stocks. Three bamboo watchtowers guarded the premises. Although this camp was cleaner because it was on a stream bank, the guards here tied ropes around the prisoners' necks when they slept. Phisit scrounged a piece of metal from which he improvised a small knife; with this, he jiggered the stocks so the prisoners could remove them when the guards were not watching. The prisoners began considering escape.

=== Lang Khang Prison ===
In mid-February 1964, the prisoners were taken down Route 9, and veered into the jungle. During their five-day march, they passed North Vietnamese road construction. Lang Khang Prison was fenced, with tall guard towers. Here the prisoners were handcuffed as well as stocked. In desperation, the Thais began devouring insects and small animals to survive. After a period of reluctance, Y. C. To and Eugene DeBruin joined in. Y. C. To began keeping a hidden calendar. By now, each of the men had lost about 10 kilos weight over five months captivity despite a policy of eating grasshoppers, crickets, and lizards.

==== First escape ====
As the guards relaxed their vigilance, Phisit cobbled up a makeshift pick for the handcuffs out of an old toothpaste tube. The prisoners loosened a log in the roof of their cell. On the night of 28 May 1964, the five prisoners crept out past a guard sleeping on the edge of the roof. Sliding through the unguarded fence, they headed west toward Thailand. Pursued for six days, reduced to drinking their own urine and to licking dew from jungle leaves, they were finally caught at a waterhole. They suffered beatings and were tortured with ant bites before being returned to Lang Khang.

On 22 August 1964, they were given a parcel sent to them by Air America for Christmas 1963. The next day, they were moved.

=== Prison number five ===
The prisoners were trucked away the next morning to Ban Pha Tang. From Ban Pha Tang, the captives marched five days to a cave filled with long-term prisoners. They stayed there three weeks.

=== Prison number six ===
After a day's walk, the five were incarcerated in a brand new prison at Ban Tham. Located near this large village in a mountain defile under heavy foliage, it had watch towers at two corners of the compound. The prisoners daily discussed escape, and concluded their first attempt had failed because they escaped during the dry season. They decided to try again during the rainy season.

At one point, they were given four scorched decaying dog's legs to eat. After two weeks, they were returned to their previous prison.

=== Prison number five redux ===
They were returned to their former cell. After bathing and receiving their first haircuts in more than a year, they were given clean uniforms and interrogated in Lao, Thai, and English with French overtones. Their claims of civilian status were disbelieved because they had parachuted. They were beaten and threatened with death; Phisit's right hand was broken with a rifle butt. Eventually, all five prisoners signed bogus confessions; Phisit swore he invaded Laos on orders of the Royal Thai Government. At the end of their questioning, they were returned to prison number six at Ban Tham.

=== Pa Kuen Prison ===
On 4 March 1965, the prisoners were moved to confinement that Phisit called "...cruelest of them all." It was so shaded by trees it was sunless. It swarmed with insects. Rations were cut to one tiny meal per day; drinking water was limited. They seemed to suffer more frequent malaria attacks there. Aircraft were constantly overhead; bombing and antiaircraft fire was often heard. Frightened guards took revenge by beating the captives.

On 3 December 1965, the captured air crew was joined by American aviator First Lieutenant Duane W. Martin, who had been shot down 20 September. About 16 February 1966, Lieutenant j.g. Dieter Dengler joined the jail population. He noted that, confined as they were, they naturally began to quarrel.

=== Ban Houei Het Prison ===
The seven prisoners were incarcerated in Ban Houei Het Prison near Ban Naden on 1 May 1966. Their march there had taken them past massive communist military construction, including a road being bulldozed. The new compound was about 22 meters square. The seven were divided into two huts, with eight guards per unit. However, the 16 guards dined together in a communal mess.

In anticipation of the now-pending rainy season, the prisoners began intense debate about escape plans. There was a split opinion whether or not to harm the guards during an escape attempt. The impatient Dengler believed the guards were fair game, but most of the others claimed the Geneva Convention allowed execution of recaptured prisoners in such cases. However, Dengler claims Phisit refused to participate in the escape plans. On the other hand, Phisit states that he favored an armed escape, based on his prior breakout.

With food becoming scarcer for all hands, including guards, the warders became meaner and almost murderous. When wild game was hunted and brought into camp, the captives received only the intestines as their share of the meal. Dissension arose between the Asians and the Americans. Dengler wondered why the Asians received better treatment from the guards, and suspected collaboration. Matters were not helped by the constant nearby air strikes. At one point, a Cessna O-1 Bird Dog seemed to spot the camp, and there was fear that they had been mistaken for a supply depot, and the forward air controller would call in a bombing raid on them.

After much argument, the prisoners arrived at an escape plan. Now that the guards had become careless, the captives would seize their weapons. While they hoped to simply imprison the guards, they decided to kill if they had to. An overheard plot by the warders to murder the prisoners and dump their bodies in the jungle hardened that resolve.

==== Second escape ====
On 29 June 1966, while the guards were eating, the group slipped out of their hand and foot restraints and grabbed the guard's unattended weapons. When the keepers spotted prisoners trying to escape, a shootout between the two sides ensued. Once the guards were killed or driven off, the prisoners split into three escape parties. Because Y. C. To could barely walk, he and Eugene DeBruin were going to climb over the nearest ridge and await rescue on the far side. Phisit and the other two Thais made up the second party. Dengler and Martin paired up in an attempt to walk west to the Mekong River. Martin was murdered by a Lao villager; Dengler was rescued 23 days after the breakout.

Phisit split from the other two Thais. Finding an overgrown stream, he enacted his plan to float downstream during nighttime and hide when it was daylight. After four floating nights, he felt he could no longer endure the cold water; he began walking. He wandered through the jungle, sometimes in a circle, plagued by daily malaria attacks, eating tadpoles for sustenance.

On day 26, he almost walked into a Vietnamese communist patrol. He spent the following two days trying to cross a North Vietnamese supply route traversed by trucks and under sporadic air attack. Failing in that, he doubled back on his tracks. On the 32nd day of his flight, he managed to cross the road, but fainted on the far side. Having been found by a Lao villager, he awoke back in captivity.

=== Ban Naden Prison ===
It was a three-day walk to his new prison at Ban Naden. There were a large number of prisoners from the Royal Lao Army, but no Americans or Thais. Inthrarathat was immured in a dugout cell in a cave's mouth, again locked into foot stocks. He estimated that his weight had dropped to about 41 kilos by then. He had daily fever attacks. At the four month mark, he briefly had a cellmate, who died. Nevertheless, Phisit began digging his way out.

== Rescue ==
Information about this prison complex was received by Central Intelligence Agency personnel responsible for operations in Laos. They devised a rescue plan which was successfully implemented on 7 January 1967. The raid uncovered an unexpectedly large number of rescuees. Their poor physical condition led to their recovery from an impromptu helicopter landing zone in the middle of the Ho Chi Minh Trail. Phisit Intharathat was thus rescued in one of Vietnam War's few successful rescues of prisoners of war, the Ban Naden raid.

Phisit, normally 70 kilos in weight, weighed only 39 kilos when recovered. After debriefing, he was taken to hospital in Bangkok. As a result of his debriefing, the CIA changed its emphasis on operations in the military region where he had been held. From passive information gathering, they now moved on to ambushes, sabotage, and calls for air strikes.

=== Aftermath ===
There was no publicity concerning the rescue mission. The King of Laos Savang Vatthana privately commended Inthrarathat, but he received no other reward. Upon recovery, Air America retained him as their assistant manager for security until 1974. After Air America departed Southeast Asia in 1975, Inthrarathat worked in Bangkok for a Thai company before retiring.

Phisit Intharathat was portrayed in films about Dieter Dengler (notably Little Dieter Needs to Fly and Rescue Dawn by director Werner Herzog). The fates of Y.C. To, Eugene DeBruin, Prasit Promsuwan and Prasit Thanee remain unknown.

== See also ==
- Dieter Dengler
- Duane W. Martin
- Eugene DeBruin
- Air America (airline)
- Raid on Ban Naden
