= Joe Bini =

American film editor

- Born: 1963 (age 62–63); San Mateo, California

Joe Bini (born Giuseppe Gaetano Bini; 1963) is an American film editor.

== Life and career ==
Bini, who lives in London, was born in San Mateo, California to Aurora Cerro Bini and Louis John Bini. As a film editor, he has collaborated with Werner Herzog on twenty-seven documentaries and feature films in twenty years, including: Little Dieter Needs to Fly (1997), Invincible (2001), Grizzly Man (2005), Rescue Dawn (2007), and Encounters at the End of the World (2007), which was nominated for the Academy Award for Best Documentary Feature.

Bini was a member of the Jury in the Documentary category for the 2006 Sundance Film Festival. He also won the 2008 Documentary Editing Award for editing Roman Polanski: Wanted and Desired. For co-writing and editing the documentary film Roman Polanski: Wanted and Desired (2008), Bini won a Primetime Emmy Award for Outstanding Writing for a Nonfiction Programming and received a nomination for Outstanding Picture Editing for a Nonfiction Program.

Bini edited Lynne Ramsay's We Need to Talk About Kevin (2011) for BBC Films and Independent and was awarded Prix Vulcain de L'Artiste-Technicien, Special Distinction at 2011 Cannes Film Festival.

He edited American Honey (2016) by Andrea Arnold and Ramsay's You Were Never Really Here (2017). Bini was also an editor for the Peabody Award-winning documentary All the Beauty and the Bloodshed that was released in 2022.

== Personal life ==
He is the father of Elia Bini, of San Francisco, California, whose mother is Caitlin Bini, also in San Francisco. Joe is currently married to filmmaker Maya Hawke.

== Filmography ==
=== Feature films ===
Year	Title	Director(s)	Notes
2001	Invincible	Werner Herzog	
2005	The Wild Blue Yonder	Werner Herzog	
2006	Rescue Dawn	Werner Herzog	
2009	Bad Lieutenant: Port of Call New Orleans	Werner Herzog	
2009	My Son, My Son, What Have Ye Done	Werner Herzog	Co-edited with Omar Daher
2011	We Need to Talk About Kevin	Lynne Ramsay	
2015	Queen of the Desert	Werner Herzog	
2016	Salt and Fire	Werner Herzog	
2016	American Honey	Andrea Arnold	
2017	You Were Never Really Here	Lynne Ramsay	
2024	My First Film	Zia Anger	Co-edited with Matthew Hannam
2024	Bird	Andrea Arnold	

=== Documentaries ===
Year	Title	Director(s)	Notes
1997	Little Dieter Needs to Fly	Werner Herzog	
1999	My Best Fiend	Werner Herzog	
2003	Wheel of Time	Werner Herzog	
2004	The White Diamond	Werner Herzog	
2005	Grizzly Man	Werner Herzog	
2007	Encounters at the End of the World	Werner Herzog	
2008	Roman Polanski: Wanted and Desired	Marina Zenovich	
2010	The Tillman Story	Amir Bar-Lev	Co-edited with Joshua Altman and Gabriel Rhodes
2010	All That Glitters	Tomas Kudrna	
2010	Cave of Forgotten Dreams	Werner Herzog	Co-edited with Maya Hawke
2010	Happy People: A Year in the Taiga	Werner Herzog and Dmitry Vasyukov	
2011	Into the Abyss	Werner Herzog	
2012	On Death Row	Werner Herzog	TV documentary series
2013	Manhunt: The Inside Story of the Hunt for Bin Laden	Greg Barker	TV documentary
2014	Tales of the Grim Sleeper	Nick Broomfield	
2016	Into the Inferno	Werner Herzog	
2022	All the Beauty and the Bloodshed	Laura Poitras	Co-edited with Amy Foote and Brian A. Kates
2025	Remake	Ross McElwee	
