= Mel Boring =

American children's author

- Born: Melvin Lyle Boring
- Occupation: American children's author; educator
- Education: Sterling College (BA); Princeton Theological Seminary (MDiv)
- Children: 4; including Jeremy Davies

Website
- Official website

Melvin Lyle Boring is an American children's author specializing in non-fiction. A member of the Society of Children's Book Writers and Illustrators, Boring has produced works such as Incredible Constructions and the People Who Built Them; Caterpillars, Bugs, and Butterflies; and Guinea Pig Scientists: Bold Self-Experimenters in Science and Medicine (coauthored with Leslie Dendy). Boring also travels the world to speak to students about book writing and publishing while he wears a Cat-in-the-Hat costume.

== Biography ==
Melvin Lyle Boring was born in St. Clair Shores, Michigan, to Harold Truman, an electrician, and Helen Irene (née Hatfield) Boring. Boring earned his B.A. from Sterling College, Kansas, in 1961, and attended Princeton Theological Seminary, where he received his Master of Divinity (M. Div.) in 1965. He began as an educator, which sparked his interest in writing books for children. He claims he had difficulty learning to read in early childhood, although he loved to hear books read to him. Those books, especially Dr. Seuss' The 500 Hats of Bartholomew Cubbins, served as inspiration for his career in writing.

== Family ==
He married his second wife, Carol Lynne Trettin, a registered nurse, on June 21, 1975; the couple has two children. He has two sons from his first marriage, including Jeremy.

== Career ==
Boring has published twelve books and over twenty-five stories in such magazines as Highlights for Children and Cricket. Boring's first twelve fiction submissions to children's magazines received a total of 143 rejections with only one acceptance. He spent eighteen years as an Institute of Children's Literature instructor, teaching hundreds of his students how to write for children.

=== Books ===
- Sealth: The Story of an American Indian, Dillon, 1978.
- The Rainmaker, Random House (New York, New York), 1980.
- Clowns: The Fun Makers, Messner, 1980.
- Wovoka: The Story of an American Indian, Dillon, 1980.
- Incredible Constructions and the People Who Built Them, Walker (New York, New York), 1984.
- Birds, Nests, and Eggs, NorthWord (Minnetonka, Minnesota), 1996.
- Caterpillars, Bugs, and Butterflies, NorthWord (Minnetonka, Minnesota), 1996.
- Rabbits, Squirrels, and Chipmunks, illustrated by Linda Garrow, NorthWord (Minnetonka, MN), 1996; 2nd. ed., Gareth Stevens (Milwaukee, Wisconsin), 2000.
- Fun with Nature, co-authored with Diane L. Burns and Leslie Dendy, illustrated by Linda Garrow, NorthWord (Minnetonka, Minnesota), 1999.
- Guinea Pig Scientists: Bold Self-Experimenters in Science and Medicine, co-authored with Leslie Dendy, illustrated by C.B. Mordan, Holt (New York, New York), 2005.
- Flamingos, Loons, and Pelicans, illustrated by Andrew Recher, NorthWord (Minnetonka, Minnesota), 2006.

=== Honors and awards ===
- Society of Children's Book Writers and Illustrators of Iowa Award
- Booklist Top Ten Science Books for Youth designation (2005)
- Book Links Lasting Connections designation (2005)
- Subaru Science Books and Films Prize finalist (2006)
- American Library Association Best Books for Young Adults designation (2006)
- New York Public Library Book for the Teen Age designation (2006)
