= Jeremy Davies =

American actor (born 1969)

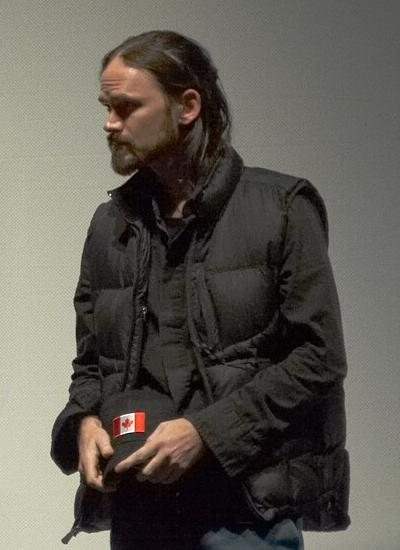
- Davies at the Toronto premiere of Rescue Dawn in 2006
- Born: Jeremy Boring; October 8, 1969 (age 57); Traverse City, Michigan, U.S.
- Occupation: Actor
- Years active: 1991–present
- Father: Mel Boring
- Website: www.jeremydavies.com/site/

Jeremy Boring (born October 28, 1969), known professionally as Jeremy Davies, is an American actor. He is known for playing Ray Aibelli in Spanking the Monkey (1994), Corporal Timothy Upham in Saving Private Ryan (1998), Private Toffler in Ravenous (1999), Snow in Solaris (2002), Bill Henson in Dogville (2003), Charles Manson in Helter Skelter (2004), Sergeant Gene DeBruin in Rescue Dawn (2006), Daniel Faraday on the series Lost (2008–2010), and Dickie Bennett in the series Justified (2011–2015).

Davies won an Emmy Award for Outstanding Guest Actor in a Drama Series in 2012 for his work in Justified. He also received the BAFTA Award for Best Performance in a Video Game for his role as Baldur in God of War (2018).

== Early life ==
Davies was born on October 8, 1969. His parents separated when he was young, leaving him to relocate to Kansas with his mother until the mid-1970s, when she died of lupus. He went to live with his father and his stepmother in Santa Barbara, California, before moving to Rockford, Iowa in 1986, where he completed high school. He attended college at the American Academy of Dramatic Arts in California, in the class of 1990.

== Career ==
In 1991, he played Roger, Robin's first boyfriend, in General Hospital. In 1992, he appeared on two episodes of The Wonder Years. He appeared in small roles in the NBC TV film Shoot First: A Cop's Vengeance and in the pilot for the colonial-era sitcom 1775. He played a youth in the Showtime thriller Guncrazy and had a guest appearance on Melrose Place. In 1993, Davies was cast in a TV commercial for Subaru in which his character compares the car to punk rock. Numerous casting directors and industry forces noticed the commercial, and Davies found himself being sent feature film scripts. Critics embraced his performance in David O. Russell's debut film, the black comedy Spanking the Monkey.

In 1998, he landed a pivotal role in Steven Spielberg's Saving Private Ryan as Corporal Upham, an American GI linguist in Normandy, recruited just after the Normandy landings by Captain John Miller (Tom Hanks) to be the interpreter on a dangerous mission to rescue the film's eponymous paratrooper (Matt Damon). Davies' performance was well received, and he went on to appear in several films, including CQ, Secretary, and Solaris. In 2004, he portrayed Charles Manson in CBS's adaptation of Helter Skelter. In 2006, he appeared in Rescue Dawn. Werner Herzog, who directed Davies in Rescue Dawn, described Davies as "a unique, very significant talent", asserting that "anywhere in the world, there [are] very, very few actors of his calibre."

Davies appeared as a main cast member on Lost during its fourth and fifth seasons (2008–09), playing Daniel Faraday, an amnesiac physicist who comes to the island as part of a team hired by Charles Widmore. He guest-starred in three episodes in Lost's sixth season. He had a recurring role on FX's Justified as Dickie Bennett, for which he earned a Primetime Emmy Award for Outstanding Guest Actor in a Drama Series in 2012. He was also nominated for the award in 2011. In 2014, Davies appeared in two episodes of Hannibal. He starred in the History Channel's 2015 miniseries Texas Rising, as Sergeant Ephraim Knowles. This was his second role in a production with Bill Paxton, the first being 1996's film Twister. In the 2017 TV drama American Gods he plays one version of Jesus Christ, and in the 2018 video game God of War, he provided the voice and motion capture for Baldur.

== Filmography ==
=== Film ===
Year	Title	Role	Notes
1992	Guncrazy	Bill	
1992	1775	Scruffy Kid	Short film
1994	Spanking the Monkey	Ray Aibelli	Nominated—Independent Spirit Award for Best Debut Performance
1994	Nell	Billy Fisher	
1996	Twister	Brian Laurence	
1997	Going All the Way	Williard "Sonny" Burns	
1997	The Locusts	Flyboy	
1998	Saving Private Ryan	Corporal Timothy "Tim" Upham	Kansas City Film Critics Circle Award for Best Supporting Actor; Online Film Critics Society Award for Best Ensemble Cast Performance; Nominated—Blockbuster Entertainment Award for Best Supporting Actor – Drama; Nominated—Screen Actors Guild Award for Outstanding Performance by a Cast in a Motion Picture
1999	Ravenous	Private Toffler	
1999	The Florentine	Truby	
2000	The Million Dollar Hotel	Tom Tom	
2000	Up at the Villa	Karl Richter	
2001	Investigating Sex	Oscar	
2001	CQ	Paul	
2002	Teknolust	Sandy	
2002	Secretary	Peter	
2002	Searching for Paradise	Adam	
2002	29 Palms	The Drifter	
2002	Solaris	Snow	Nominated—Satellite Award for Best Supporting Actor – Motion Picture
2003	Dogville	Bill Henson	
2005	Manderlay	Niels	
2006	Rescue Dawn	Gene	
2010	It's Kind of a Funny Story	Smitty	
2017	Justice League Dark	Ritchie Simpson (voice)	Direct-to-video
2018	The House That Jack Built	Al	
2021	The Black Phone	Terrence Blake	
2022	The Infernal Machine	Elijah Barett	
2022	Bitcon	Lew	
2023	Dark Harvest	Dan Shepard	
2023	Adventures of the Naked Umbrella	Sam Wanoutsky	
2025	Black Phone 2	Terrence Blake	

=== Television ===
Year	Title	Role	Notes
1991	Dream On	Mugger #3	Episode: "No, I'm Just Happy to See You"
1991	Shoot First: A Cop's Vengeance	White Punk	Television film
1992	General Hospital	Roger	
1992	The Wonder Years	Eddie Horvath	2 episodes
1992	Melrose Place	Pete Stoller	Episode: "The Whole Truth"
2001	The Atlantis Conspiracy	Flush	Television film
2002	The Laramie Project	Jedadiah Schultz	Television film Nominated—Satellite Award for Best Supporting Actor – Series, Miniseries or Television Film
2004	Helter Skelter	Charles Manson	Television film
2008–2010	Lost	Daniel Faraday	23 episodes Nominated—Saturn Award for Best Supporting Actor on Television
2011–2015	Justified	Dickie Bennett	20 episodes Primetime Emmy Award for Outstanding Guest Actor in a Drama Series (2012); Nominated—Primetime Emmy Award for Outstanding Guest Actor in a Drama Series (2011)
2014	Hannibal	Peter Bernardone	2 episodes
2014	Constantine	Ritchie Simpson	Episodes: "Non Est Asylum" and "A Whole World Out There"
2015	Texas Rising	Sergeant Ephraim Knowles	5 episodes
2016	Lucifer	Nick Hofmeister	Episode: "Lucifer, Stay. Good Devil."
2017	Sleepy Hollow	Malcolm Dreyfuss	13 episodes
2017	American Gods	Jesus Prime	Episode: "Come to Jesus"
2017	Twin Peaks	Jimmy	Episode: "Part 6"
2018	The Flash	Dr. John Deegan	Episode: "Elseworlds"
2018	Arrow	Dr. John Deegan	Episode: "Elseworlds"
2018	Supergirl	Dr. John Deegan	Episode: "Elseworlds"
2020	FBI	Kenneth Bates	Episode: "Hard Decisions"
2020	The Rookie	Detective Bill Summerland	Episode: "Hand-off"

=== Video games ===
Year	Title	Role	Notes
2018	God of War	The Stranger / Baldur	BAFTA Games Award for Best Performer; Nominated—NAVGTR Award for Performance in a Drama, Supporting
2022	God of War Ragnarök	Baldur	
