= Continental Air Services, Inc =

Defunct airline of the United States (1965–1975)

Continental Air Services
- Founded: April 1965
- Commenced operations: September 1, 1965
- Ceased operations: 1975
- Operating bases: Phnom Penh; Viangchan; Bangkok–Don Mueang; Saigon; Singapore–Seletar
- Fleet size: See Fleet below
- Parent company: Continental Airlines
- Headquarters: Los Angeles, California, U.S.

Continental Air Services, Inc (better known in abbreviations as CASI) was a subsidiary airline of Continental Airlines set up to provide operations and airlift support in Southeast Asia during the Vietnam War. CASI was formed as the South-East Asia Division of Continental in April 1965 with operations starting in September 1965 using approximately 22, mainly STOL, aircraft. Continental formed CASI by paying over a million US dollars for BirdAir (Bird and Sons) and its 350 employees and 22 aircraft. CASI aircraft in Laos were registered as Air Continental. As of 1998, Continental Airlines still operated in the Pacific Islands (as Continental Micronesia). In 2010, Continental merged into United Airlines.

== Organization ==
CASI, as a Nevada Corporation, was officially located at One East First Street, Reno, Nevada but its headquarters was located at 7300 World Way West, Los Angeles, California. CASI maintained Overseas Offices in Bangkok, Vientiane, and Saigon. CASI's Southeast Asia headquarters was in Vientiane, with operations bases at Phnom Penh, Vientiane, Singapore, Bangkok, and Saigon.

CASI's original purpose was to operate aircraft and ground facilities to support projects involving construction, oil exploration and engineering companies as well as contracts with USAID and other government agencies. Since CASI was operating under US government contracts CASI had a liaison with the US government, Pierre Salinger, who was designated as Vice-President of the operation. Because CASI operated in the southeast Asia region to assist the US government at the conclusion of the war Continental Airlines (CAL) was granted a contract with the Micronesian Trust Territory to set up and operate an airline (Air Micronesia) in the Micronesian islands for a designated period (6 years). After the 6 years CAL was to turn over the operation to the Trust Territory authorities but that never happen for a number of reasons. Today, CAL, now United Airlines, continues to operate in that region with a base in Guam.

== Uniforms ==
Initially CASI uniforms were locally made khaki uniforms which were manufactured in different parts of Laos, Thailand or Vietnam. Some shirts are 2-pocket, others are 4-pocket safari-type jackets. Most CASI pilots were issued the baseball cap. A few of the early CASI pilots were issued the "bus driver" hat. Wings were both US-made and Laotian-made and were worn in Vietnam but not in Laos.

== Fleet ==
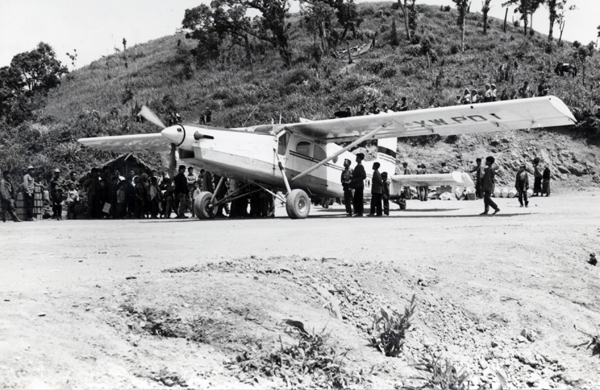
Continental Air Service Pilatus PC-6 Porter Short-Take-Off-and-Landing (STOL) aircraft in Laos

CASI/Bird Air were known to operate the following aircraft:

- Beech 18
- Beech Baron
- Beech D50C Twin Bonanza
- Bell 47G-3B-1 Sioux
- Bell 205
- Bell 206A JetRanger
- Camair Twin Navion, a Ryan Navion converted by Cameron Aircraft Co
- Cessna 180
- Cessna 206
- Convair CV-440
- Curtiss C-46
- de Havilland Canada DHC-6 Twin Otter-300
- Dornier Do 28A-1 & B-1
- Douglas DC-3/C-47 Skytrain
- Douglas DC-6A/B
- Fairchild Hiller FH-1100
- Helio 395 Super Courier
- Lockheed PV-2 Ventura
- Lockheed L-100 Hercules (civilian version of the Lockheed C-130)
- Pilatus PC-6 Porter & Turbo Porter
- Piper PA-18 Super Cub
- Scottish Aviation Twin Pioneer Series 2
- Short SC.7-3-200 Skyvan

Total fleet: 37 to 45 aircraft by 1976

CASI occasionally leased its assets to others such as:

- Foreign Air Travel Development, Inc
- Boun Oum Airways

== See also ==
- Air America
- Northwest Orient Airlines
- Pacific Corporation
- Rendition aircraft
- Allegations of CIA drug trafficking
- List of defunct airlines of the United States
