= Eugene DeBruin =

American prisoner of war during the Vietnam War

- Born: Eugene Henry DeBruin; April 1, 1933; Kaukauna, Wisconsin, U.S.
- Disappeared: June 29, 1966 (aged 33); Near Hoi Het, Laos
- Status: Missing in action
- Military career
- Allegiance: United States of America
- Branch: United States Air Force
- Service years: 1952–1956
- Rank: Staff sergeant, USAF; U.S. Civilian, Air America
- Conflicts: Vietnam War; Laotian Civil War

Eugene Henry DeBruin (April 1, 1933 – c. 1968) was a former U.S. Air Force staff sergeant who disappeared after an escape attempt from a prison camp in Laos during the Vietnam War. In 1963, while working for Air America, DeBruin's C-46 was shot down and he was taken to a Pathet Lao prison camp. In 1966, he and six other prisoners, including Dieter Dengler and Phisit Intharathat, attempted to escape. DeBruin's date of death is disputed and he remains classified as missing in action.

In 2017, his name, alongside fellow prisoners Dengler and Duane W. Martin, and two others, was added to a permanent exhibit on the USS Turner Joy, now housed in a Bremerton, Washington museum. His name also appears on a brick in the Veterans Memorial Park's Ring of Honor in his hometown of Kaukauna, Wisconsin.

== Early life and education ==
Eugene DeBruin was born April 1, 1933, in Kaukauna, Wisconsin, the second eldest of ten children. He grew up on a farm and became interested in outdoor activities such as hunting, fishing, and skiing. After graduating from Kaukauna High School in 1952, he joined the U.S. Air Force and served as an aircraft mechanic for four years in the US and Japan. During this time, he obtained a private pilot license, learned judo, and reached the rank of staff sergeant.

After being discharged from the Air Force, DeBruin enrolled at the University of Montana, where he earned a bachelor's degree in forestry. He trained as a smokejumper with the U.S. Forest Service and the Bureau of Land Management, then worked as a smokejumper in Alaska. He then worked as a smokejumper for three years before moving to Mexico to learn Spanish with the intent of becoming a writer. After declining to join the Peace Corps, DeBruin joined Air America in July 1963 as a kicker. His job was to kick the pallets of rice and other food out of an airplane to aid Laotian refugees. According to his brother, he had plans of joining the Peace Corps after he finished his stint with Air America.

== Capture and disappearance ==
On September 5, 1963, during one of his flights over Laos with Air America, DeBruin's C-46 cargo airliner was shot down by ground fire during a transportation mission with Americans Joseph C. Cheney II, Charles G. Herrick; Thai citizens Phisit Intharathat, Prasit Promsuwan, and Prasit Thanee; and Chinese national To Yick Chiu. The crash occurred about 2 kilometres (1.2 mi) from Tchepone. Cheney and Herrick were killed and DeBruin, To, Intharathat, Promsuwan, and Thanee were captured by the Pathet Lao. The group of five were moved to four different prisons before an escape attempt in May 1964, which was successful for three days before they were caught at a watering hole. The Pathet Lao announced that prisoners, including DeBruin, would be released but did not follow through.

DeBruin's second escape attempt occurred on June 29, 1966 along with his Air America colleagues, US Air Force pilot Duane W. Martin, and Dieter Dengler, who the group initially suspected to be an informant due to his German accent. While the guards were eating, the prisoners slipped out of their restraints and seized the guards' unattended weapons. They encountered at least five guards upon escaping the cell and split into three groups: Dengler and Martin, DeBruin and To, and Intharathat, Promsuwan, and Thanee. To was initially meant to travel with the Thai men but was very ill, and DeBruin chose to remain with him.

Of the seven prisoners, only Dengler and Intharathat survived. Reports about DeBruin's death vary; one report stated he was killed during the escape attempt but Intharathat said during his debrief that he saw DeBruin attempting to "reach high ground in a classified location." A 1971 reconnaissance by a CIA caseworker showed that DeBruin was held at Muong Phine after the escape attempt and moved to Muong Nong in early 1967, where he was strictly guarded. He and eight other prisoners were reportedly taken away by Vietnamese officials in January 1968 and DeBruin was never seen again. Both the CIA and the Defense Intelligence Agency dismissed this finding. DeBruin's brother Jerome traveled to Laos in 1972 in search of information but was told that the Pathet Lao would only negotiate with the US government. In 1993, an editor from the Tampa Bay Times wrote that the US Department of State told her Laotian government officials claimed DeBruin was killed in 1982 during another escape attempt.

== Rescue Dawn portrayal ==
DeBruin was portrayed by Jeremy Davies in Werner Herzog's 2007 film Rescue Dawn, which focused mainly on Dengler's life. DeBruin was depicted as selfish, unstable, and ready to betray his fellow prisoners at any time. The film received criticism from members of DeBruin's family and from Phisit Intharathat. Accounts from Dengler's 1979 autobiography Escape from Laos described DeBruin as kind, inventive, and intelligent, and wrote that he was integral to planning their escape. Herzog later acknowledged that DeBruin acted heroically during his imprisonment but defended his choices, saying he took "artistic liberty" based in part on conversations with Dengler years before about the "antagonistic relationships among the prisoners when under extreme duress."

== See also ==
- List of people who disappeared
