= Little Dieter Needs to Fly =

1997 documentary film directed by Werner Herzog

- DVD cover
- Directed by: Werner Herzog
- Written by: Werner Herzog
- Produced by: Lucki Stipetić
- Starring: Dieter Dengler; Werner Herzog (voice); Eugene Deatrick
- Narrated by: Werner Herzog; Dieter Dengler
- Cinematography: Peter Zeitlinger
- Edited by: Joe Bini; Glen Scantlebury; Rainer Standke
- Production companies: Werner Herzog Filmproduktion; ZDF; BBC; Arte; Media Ventures
- Distributed by: Werner Herzog Filmproduktion
- Release date: August 1997 (Telluride)
- Running time: 78 minutes (with postscript filmed in 2001); 74 minutes (theatrical); 52 minutes (television)
- Countries: Germany; United Kingdom; France
- Languages: English; German

Little Dieter Needs to Fly (German: Flucht aus Laos, lit. 'Escape from Laos') is a 1997 German-British-French documentary film written and directed by Werner Herzog, produced by Werner Herzog Filmproduktion, and premiered on German television. The film follows the life of Dieter Dengler, in particular being shot down during the Vietnam War and his capture, imprisonment, escape, and rescue. Herzog went on to direct a dramatized version of the story, Rescue Dawn, which stars Christian Bale as Dengler in 2006.

Little Dieter Needs to Fly was released on DVD in 1998 by Anchor Bay, and on Blu-Ray in 2014 by Shout! Factory as a part of a larger collection of Herzog's films.

== Plot ==
Werner Herzog found a kindred spirit in the German-American Navy pilot and Vietnam War veteran Dieter Dengler. Like Herzog, Dengler grew up in a Germany reduced to rubble by World War II, and Dengler's stories of hunger and deprivation in the years after the war echo similar stories from Herzog's past. Dengler recounts an early memory of Allied fighter-bombers destroying his village and says he decided he wanted to be a pilot after seeing one of these pilots fly past his house.

At the age of 18, Dengler emigrated to the United States, where he served a two-year enlistment in the United States Air Force. Frustratingly, he was unable to gain a pilot's slot in that service, so he left the Air Force, attended college, and then joined the Navy. After completing flight training, he was assigned as a Douglas A-1 Skyraider pilot in Attack Squadron 65 aboard the aircraft carrier USS Constellation.

In 1966, Dengler served aboard USS Ranger with Attack Squadron 145. At the time, the squadron was equipped with the Douglas AD-6/A-1H Skyraider, a single-engine, propeller-driven attack plane. On the morning of 1 February, Lieutenant Dengler launched from Ranger with three other aircraft on an interdiction mission near the Laotian border. Visibility was poor due to weather, and upon rolling in on the target, Dengler and the remainder of his flight lost sight of one another. Dengler was the last man in and was hit by anti-aircraft fire. He was forced to crash-land his Skyraider in Laos.

Dengler was taken prisoner of war by the Pathet Lao and then turned over to soldiers of the Army of North Vietnam. After a period of torture and starvation spent handcuffed to six other prisoners in a bamboo prisoner-of-war camp, Dengler escaped. He was subsequently rescued after being spotted by United States Air Force pilot Eugene Deatrick.

The bulk of the middle of the film consists of footage from a trip Herzog took with Dengler back to Laos and Thailand to recreate his ordeal three decades after the fact. Herzog hired locals to play the part of the captors and had Dengler retrace his steps while describing his experiences. A postscript consisting of footage from Dengler's funeral in 2001 was later added to the film.

Herzog subsequently directed Rescue Dawn, a feature film based on the events of Dengler's capture, imprisonment, escape, and rescue. That film, starring Christian Bale as Dengler, was released on 24 July 2007.

== Cast ==
- Dieter Dengler as himself
- Werner Herzog (voice) as himself/narrator
- Eugene Deatrick as himself

== Reception ==
Little Dieter Needs to Fly received critical acclaim. On review aggregator website Rotten Tomatoes, the film has a 93% rating based on 14 reviews, with an average of 7.8/10.

Roger Ebert gave the film 3.5 stars out of 4.

== Awards ==
- 1997: Special Jury Award – International Documentary Filmfestival Amsterdam
- 1998: IDA Award – International Documentary Association
- 1999: Gold Apple – National Educational Media Network, USA
- 1999: Golden Spire – San Francisco International Film Festival
- 1999: Silver FIPA – Biarritz International Festival of Audiovisual Programming

== Bibliography ==
- Ames, Eric. Ferocious Reality: Documentary according to Werner Herzog. Minneapolis: University of Minnesota, 2012.
- Gerhardt, Christina. "The Allied Bombing Campaign of Germany in Herzog's Little Dieter Needs to Fly". Bombs Away: Representing the Air War over Europe and Japan . Eds. William Rasch and Wilfried Wilms. Amsterdam: Rodopi, 2006. 345-354.
- Prager, Brad. The Cinema of Werner Herzog: Aesthetic Ecstasy and Truth. New York: Wallflower, 2007.
