= Air America (airline) =

CIA covert airline from 1950 to 1976

IATA	ICAO	Call sign
FA	FA	AIR AMERICA
- Founded: 1946; 80 years ago (as Chinese National Relief and Rehabilitation Administration Air Transport); 1950; 76 years ago (as Civil Air Transport); August 23, 1959; 67 years ago (as Air America)
- Ceased operations: June 30, 1976; 50 years ago
- Operating bases: Saigon; Vientiane; Udorn
- Fleet size: 80+
- Parent company: American Airdale Corporation
- Headquarters: Washington, D.C.

Notes
- (1) IATA, ICAO codes were the same until the 1980s

Air America was an American passenger and cargo airline established, originally under Civil Air Transport (CAT), in 1946 and covertly owned and operated by the Central Intelligence Agency (CIA) from 1950 to 1976, adopting the Air America name in 1959. It supplied and supported covert operations in Southeast Asia during the Vietnam War. Some people have claimed Air America pilots provided support for drug smuggling in Laos, but the issue remains unclear. Its slogan was "Anything, Anywhere, Anytime, Professionally".

It was not a "normal airline," but did many of the flights that a normal airline would do. Despite the fact that it was owned and operated by the CIA, it quickly became the largest air carrier in the region, and therefore performed many of the normal operations of an airline. They transported hundreds of millions of dollars worth of cargo each year, and operated otherwise regularly scheduled passenger flights. They resupplied humanitarian workers in the field, supplying rural villages with lumber, chickens, seed, rice, and other items. They also searched for drowning victims at sea.

== Early history ==
Air America Bell 205 helicopter leaving a Hmong fire support base in the Laotian Plain of Jars, c. 1969

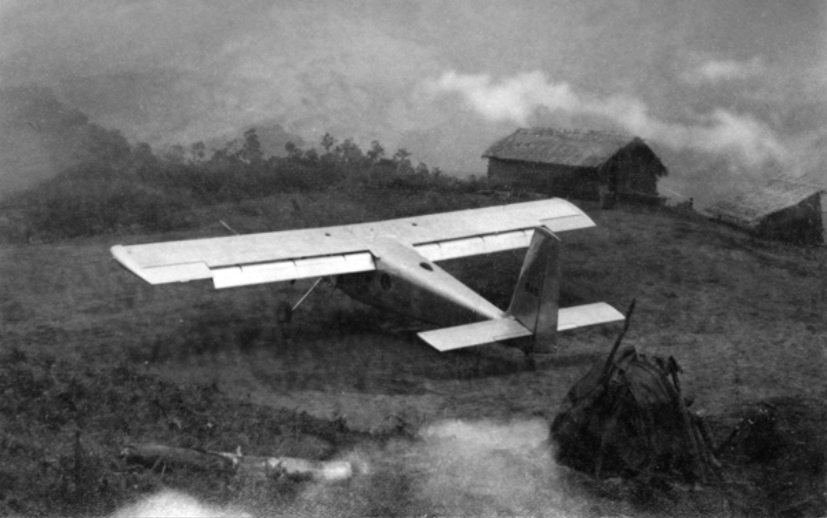
Air America U-10D Helio Courier aircraft in Laos on a covert mountaintop landing strip (LS) "Lima site"

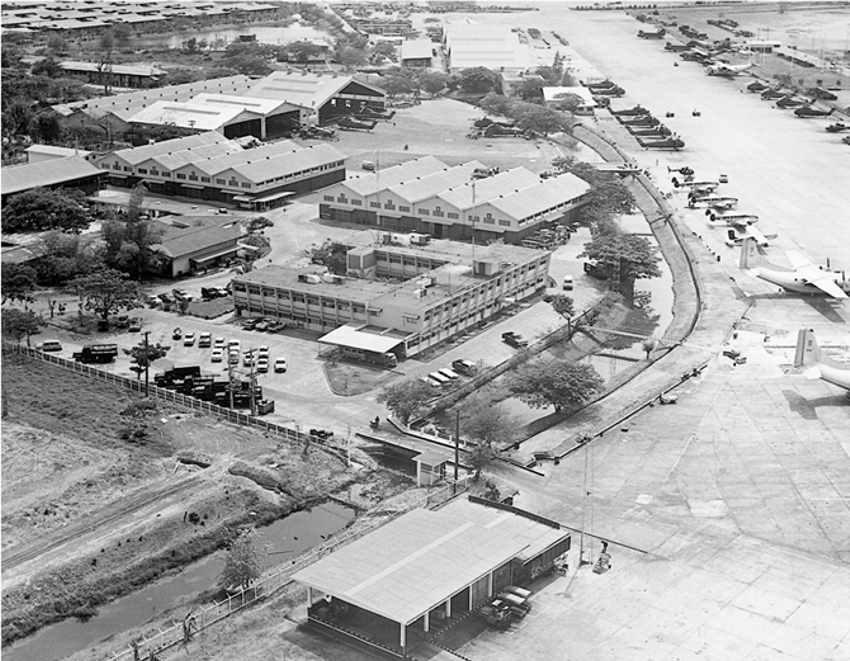
Air America headquarters at Udorn Royal Thai Air Force Base, c. 1967

The airline can trace its roots to 1946, when it was founded by former American military aviator Claire Lee Chennault and diplomat Whiting Willauer as Chinese National Relief and Rehabilitation Administration Air Transport to airlift supplies and food into the war-ravaged Republic of China. It was soon pressed into service to support Generalissimo Chiang Kai-shek and the nationalist Republic of China Armed Forces in the civil war between them and the communist People's Liberation Army under Mao Zedong. Many of its first pilots were veterans of Chennault's World War II combat groups, popularly known as Flying Tigers. By 1950, following the defeat of the nationalist forces and their retreat to Taiwan, the airline faced financial difficulties. In August 1950, the CIA bought the company and renamed it to Civil Air Transport, until 1959, when it changed its name to Air America. The first two transports of Air America arrived in Vientiane, Laos, on August 23, 1959.

Air America aircraft, including the Curtiss C-46 Commando, Pilatus PC-6 Porter, de Havilland Canada DHC-4 Caribou, Lockheed C-130 Hercules, and Fairchild C-123 Provider, along with Sikorsky UH-34D, Bell 204B, Bell 205, and Boeing CH-47C Chinook helicopters, flew many types of cargo to countries such as South Vietnam, Laos, and Cambodia. It operated from bases in those countries and also from bases in Thailand and as far afield as Taiwan and Japan. It also on occasion flew top-secret missions into Burma and China.

== Operations during the Vietnam War ==
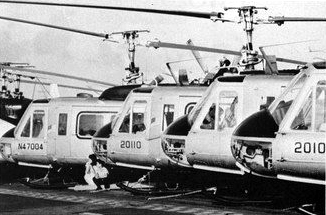
Air America Bell 205s being evacuated aboard USS Hancock, in 1975

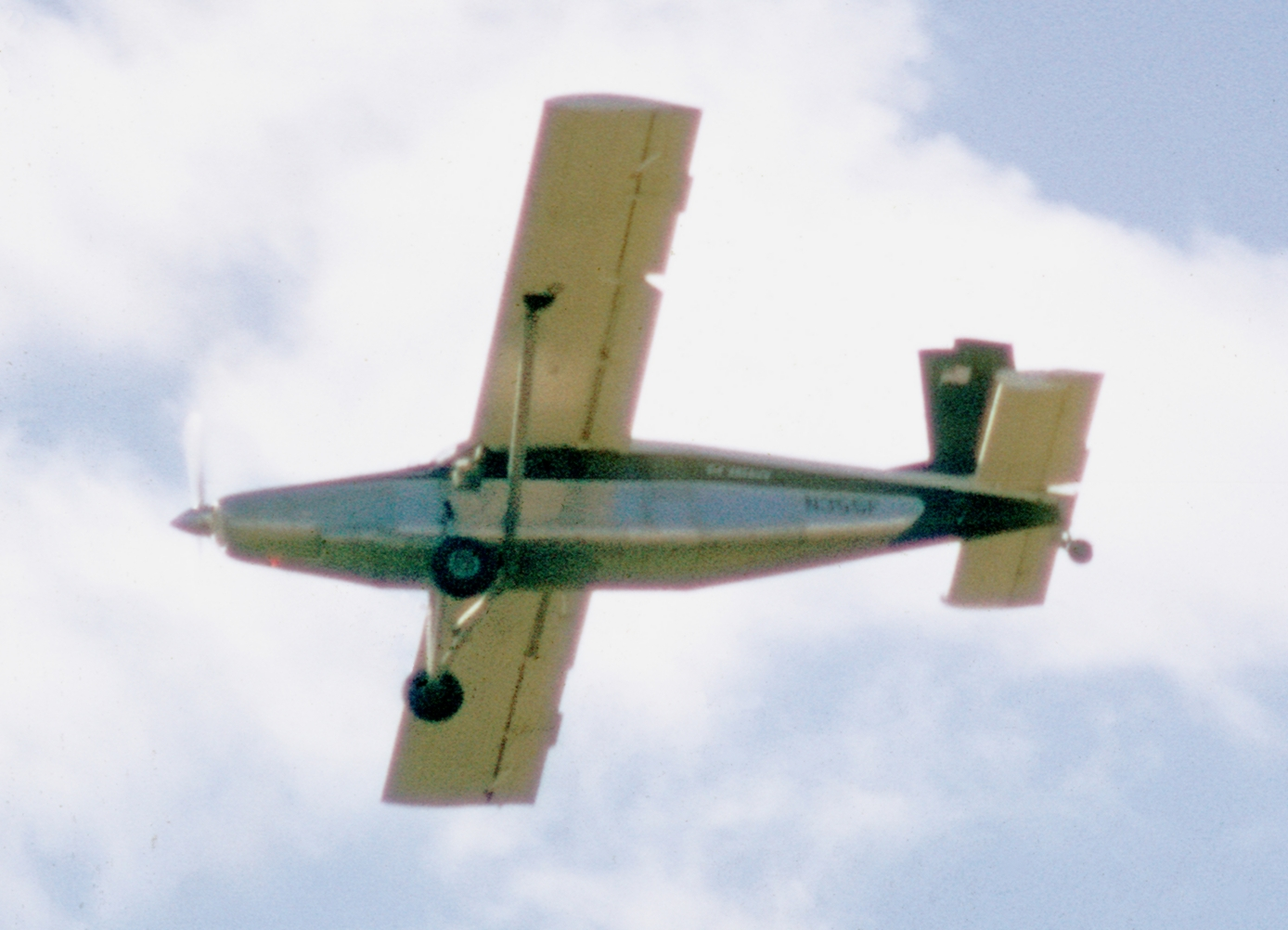
An Air America Pilatus PC-6 Porter

From 1959 to 1962 the airline provided direct and indirect support to US Special Forces "Ambidextrous", "Hotfoot", and "White Star", which trained the regular Royal Laotian armed forces. After 1962 a similar operation known as Project 404 fielded numerous US Army attachés (ARMA) and air attachés (AIRA) to the US embassy in Vientiane.

From 1962 to 1975, Air America inserted and extracted US personnel, provided logistical support to the Royal Lao Army, the Hmong Army under command of Royal Lao Army Major General Vang Pao and combatant Thai volunteer forces, transported refugees, and flew photo reconnaissance missions that provided intelligence on Viet Cong activities. Its operations were some of the first launched by the U.S. as it became increasingly involved militarily in Southeast Asia. Its civilian-marked craft were frequently used, under the control of the Seventh/Thirteenth Air Force, to launch search and rescue missions for US pilots downed throughout Southeast Asia. Air America pilots were the only known private US corporate employees to operate non-Federal Aviation Administration-certified military aircraft in a combat role. Dan Kurtz, originally from Michigan, masterminded the civilian masquerade of commercial pilots that in reality were covert CIA operatives flying rescue and supply missions in the late '60s.

By mid-1970, the airline had two dozen twin-engine transport aircraft as well as Boeing 727 and Boeing 747 jets plus two dozen fixed wing short-take off-and-landing aircraft in addition to 30 helicopters dedicated to operations in Burma, Cambodia, Thailand, and Laos. There were more than 300 pilots, copilots, flight mechanics, and airfreight specialists based in Laos, Vietnam, and Thailand. During 1970, Air America delivered 46 million pounds (21,000 metric tons) of food in Laos. Helicopter flight time reached more than 4,000 hours a month in the same year.

Air America flew civilians, diplomats, spies, refugees, commandos, sabotage teams, doctors, war casualties, drug enforcement officers, and even visiting VIPs like U.S. President Richard Nixon all over Southeast Asia. Part of the CIA's support operations in Laos involved logistical support for Hmong militia fighting the North Vietnamese forces and their Pathet Lao allies. Thousands of tons of food were delivered via Air America routes, including live chickens, pigs, water buffalo, and cattle. On top of the food drops (known as "rice drops") came the logistical demands for the war itself, and Air America pilots flew thousands of flights transporting and air-dropping ammunition and weapons (referred to as "hard rice") to friendly forces.

=== Flying for the International Commission of Control and Supervision ===
The International Commission of Control and Supervision (ICCS) was an international monitoring force created on 27 January 1973. It was formed, following the signing of the Paris Peace Accords ("Paris Agreement on Ending the War and Restoring Peace in Vietnam"), to replace the similarly-named International Commission for Supervision and Control in Vietnam (ICSC). The ICCS was led by a director general, with Pudjo Prasetyo of Indonesia as the last officeholder.

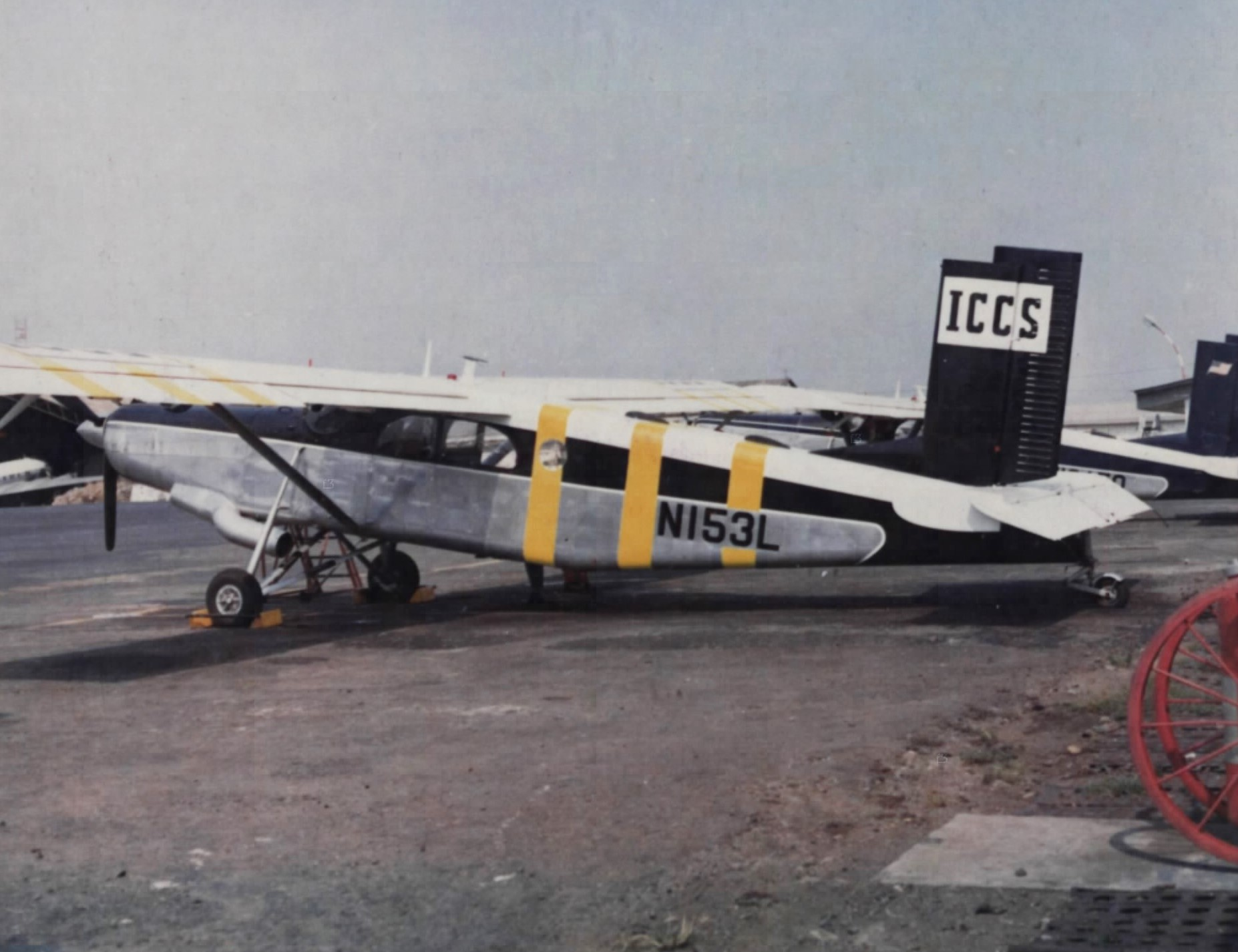
ICCS Pilatus Porter Tan Son Nhut Air Base

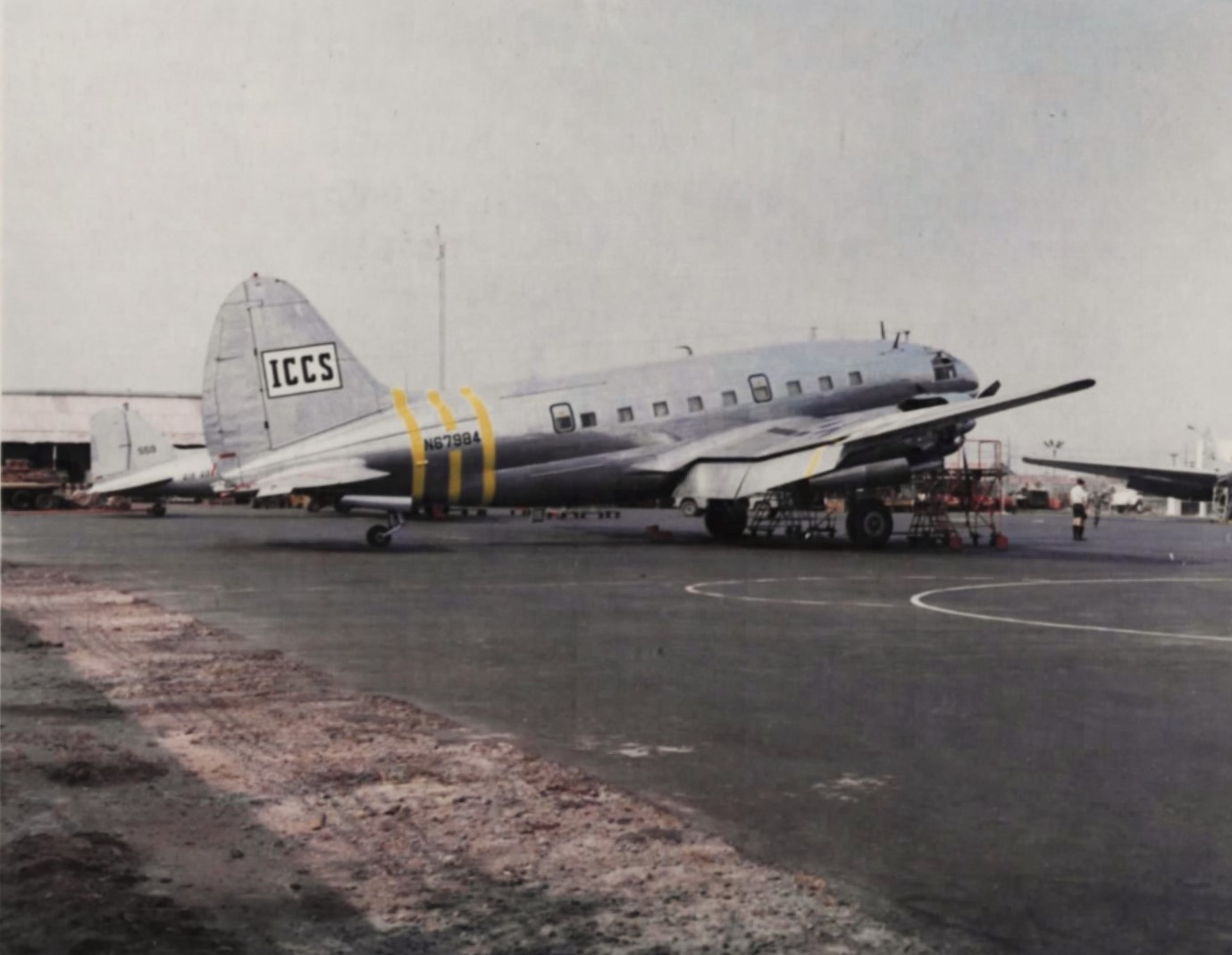
Air America ICCS C-46 Tan Son Nhut Air Base March 1973

For reasons of distance and for reasons of safety, in a time of conflict, the ICCS often traveled by air. Requiring pilots experienced at flying over mountain and jungle, and men accustomed to the unpredictable military background of the region, the ICCS gave a contract to Air America. Initially under the command of Col. J. A. Mitchell, of Canada, this organization gave a coat of white paint to its aircraft and panels indicating 'ICCS', to operate as: ICCS Air Services.

When the North Vietnamese Army overran South Vietnam in 1975, Air America helicopters participated in Operation Frequent Wind evacuating both U.S. civilians and South Vietnamese people associated with the South Vietnamese government. The infamous photograph depicting the final evacuation, by Dutch photographer Hubert van Es, was an Air America helicopter taking people from an apartment building at 22 Gia Long Street used by USAID and CIA employees.

Air America Wings
Supervisory Pilot	Captain in Command
Air America Pilot Wings	
Pilot	Crew

=== Allegations of drug trafficking ===
Air America planes sometimes transported drugs during the Laotian Civil War, though there is debate about whether Air America and the CIA were actively involved or merely allowed others to transport drugs. During the war, the CIA recruited people from the Hmong population to fight the Pathet Lao rebels and their North Vietnamese allies. Because of the conflict, many Hmong depended upon poppy cultivation for money. According to historian Alfred W. McCoy, because the Plain of Jars had been captured by the Pathet Lao in 1964, the Laotian Air Force was no longer able to land C-47 transport aircraft on the Plain of Jars, which McCoy says transported opium. According to McCoy, as the Laotian Air Force had few light planes that could land on the dirt runways near the mountaintop poppy fields, Air America was used as it was the only airline available in northern Laos.

Air America were alleged to have profited from transporting opium and heroin on behalf of Hmong leader Vang Pao, or of "turning a blind eye" to the Laotian military doing it. This allegation has been supported by former Laos CIA paramilitary Anthony Poshepny, former Air America pilots, and other people involved in the war. It is portrayed in the movie Air America. However, University of Georgia aviation historian William M. Leary writes that Air America was not involved in the drug trade, citing Joseph Westermeyer, a physician and public health worker resident in Laos from 1965 to 1975, that "American-owned airlines never knowingly transported opium in or out of Laos, nor did their American pilots ever profit from its transport." Aviation historian Curtis Peebles also denies that Air America employees were involved in opium transportation.

Historian Alfred W. McCoy stated that:

In most cases, the CIA's role involved various forms of complicity, tolerance or studied ignorance about the trade, not any direct culpability in the actual trafficking ... The CIA did not handle heroin, but it did provide its drug lord allies with transport, arms, and political protection.

== After the war ==
After pulling out of South Vietnam in 1975, there was an attempt to keep a company presence in Udon Thani, Thailand. After this fell through, Air America was dissolved on June 30, 1976, and the operating authority certificate was cancelled by the Civil Aeronautics Board on January 31, 1974. Air Asia, the subsidiary that held all of the Air America assets, was later purchased by Evergreen International Airlines. All proceeds, a sum between 20 and 25 million dollars, were returned to the US Treasury. The employees were released unceremoniously with no accolades and no benefits even for those who suffered long-term disabilities, nor death benefits for families of employees killed in action. Such benefits as were afforded came from worker's compensation insurance required by contracts with the U.S. Air Force that few knew about. The benefits were not awarded easily. Many disabled pilots were ultimately compensated under the Longshore and Harbor Workers' Compensation Act after lengthy battles with CIA officials who denied their connection to the airline for years, and many died of their injuries before they could be compensated adequately. Accident reports were said to have been falsified, redacted, and stonewalled by CIA officials who continued to deny any relationship to the events described in them.

Air America pilots have attempted to have their pensions enhanced.

== Fleet ==
During its existence Air America operated a diverse fleet of aircraft, the majority of which were STOL capable. There was "fluidity" of aircraft between some companies such as Air America, Boun Oum Airways, Continental Air Services, Inc, and the United States Air Force. It was not uncommon for USAF and United States Army Aviation units to lend aircraft to Air America for specific missions. Air America tended to register its aircraft in Taiwan, but operated in Laos without the B- nationality prefix. US military aircraft were often used with the "last three" digits of the military serial as a civil marking.

=== Fixed wing ===
- C-45 Expeditors
  - Volpar Beech 18 – Volpar converted 14 aircraft to turboprop power with Garrett AiResearch TPE-331 engines; modified aircraft were called Volpar Turbo Beeches and also had a further increase in MTOW to 10,286 lb (4,666 kg). They were called Volpars in Air America service.
- Beechcraft Baron
- Boeing C-97 Stratofreighter
- Boeing 727-92C
- Budd RB-1 Conestoga
- Consolidated PBY-5A Catalina
- Curtiss C-46
- Curtiss-Wright C-76 Caravan
- de Havilland DH.89A Dragon Rapide
- de Havilland Canada DHC-2 Beaver
- de Havilland Canada DHC-3 Otter
- de Havilland Canada DHC-4 Caribou
- de Havilland Canada DHC-6 Twin Otter 300
- Dornier Do 28-A
- Douglas B-26 Invader (On Mark Marksman conversion)
- Douglas C-47
- Douglas DC-4
- Douglas DC-6A/B
- Grumman HU-16 Albatross
- Grumman American AA-5
- Martin 4-0-4
- Martin B-26 Marauder
- Howard DGA-15
- Interstate Cadet
- Fairchild AU-23 Peacemaker
- Fairchild C-82 Packet
- Fairchild C-119 Flying Boxcar
- Fairchild C-123B And K Provider
- Helio Courier and Super Courier
- Helio Twin Courier
- Lockheed Ventura
- Lockheed Lodestar
- Lockheed P-2 Neptune
- Lockheed L.1049H Constellation
- Lockheed C-130A/E Hercules
- Noorduyn C-64 Norseman
- North American B-25 Mitchell
- Northrop Delta
- Northrop YC-125 Raider
- Pilatus Turbo-Porter (including Fairchild Hiller version)
- Piper Apache
- Taylorcraft L-2
- Republic XF-12 Rainbow
- Ryan Navion
- Spartan C4
- Spartan Executive
- Stinson L-5 Sentinel
- Waco Standard Cabin series

=== Helicopters ===
- Bell 47
- Boeing Vertol SH-46 Sea Knight
- Bell 204B
- Bell 205
- Boeing-Vertol CH-47C Chinook
- Hughes 500D
- Hughes OH-6A Cayuse
- Kaman SH-2 Seasprite
- Sikorsky S-55/H-19
- Sikorsky H-34 (including Sikorsky S-58T)
- Sikorsky CH-54 Skycrane

== Air Asia ==
Air Asia was a wholly owned subsidiary of Air America which provided technical, management, and equipment services for Civil Air Transport. Air Asia was headquartered in Taipei and its main facilities were in Tainan, Taiwan. It is now located in the Tainan Airport. It is the only surviving member of the Pacific Corporation, but currently it is owned by Taiwan Aerospace Corporation and is no longer related to the Central Intelligence Agency.

== 1980s airline ==
In the 1980s, a Los Angeles-based passenger airline, originally known as Total Air, revived the Air America name, operating Lockheed L-1011 TriStar wide body aircraft with scheduled service between Baltimore (BWI), Detroit (DTW), Honolulu (HNL), London (LGW) and Los Angeles (LAX).

== Accidents and incidents ==
- On May 5, 1954, a CAT C-119 crashed in Laos after being hit by ground fire. Pilot James B. McGovern Jr. and Wallace Buford were killed. [McGovern's remains were identified in September 2006].
- On September 5, 1963, a C-46 aircraft was hit by ground fire and crashed about two kilometers from Tchepone in the Savannakhet Province. American Eugene DeBruin, Chinese Y. C. To, and the three Thai nationals, Pisidhi Indradat, Prasit Promsuwan, and Prasit Thanee parachuted to safety, but were immediately captured by the Pathet Lao. Joseph C. Cheney and Charles Herrick were killed in the crash. DeBruin, To, Promsuwan, and Thanee are still missing in action. Pisidhi Indradat was later rescued in January 1967.
- On August 20, 1965, a UH-34 crashed and sank into the Mekong River. The three crew members, Pilot Bobby Nunez, deadheading pilot Calhoun and Flight Mechanic Steve Nichols, managed to escape while the four passengers drowned. [CIA Agents Edward Johnson and Louis O'Jibway, intelligence officers assigned to Air America, were killed] Surnames are only mentioned on the manifest for both crew and passengers. The deadheading pilot, Mr. Calhoun, was involved in a hull loss of another UH-34 earlier that day when the helicopter performed a ground loop.
- On September 27, 1965, a C-45 N9574Z was shot down by small arms fire as it attempted to land near Bao Trai Airstrip, Hau Nghia Province, Vietnam. Pilot John Lerdo Oyer, and Jack J Wells were killed in the crash.
- On October 12, 1965, a UH-34 H-32 581444 Crashed on take-off from a pad at coordinates XC 675465 near Saravane Laos (L-44) in MR 4 and hit the ground at 90 mph, killing the pilot, Capt. Richard H. Liebert, the co-pilot, Franklin D. Smith, and 2 USAID passengers, including Mike Deuel and Michael A. Maloney. The helicopter had dropped off a payroll at a site east of Se Kong and apparently had engine problems during take-off
- On January 12, 1968, an Air America Bell UH-1D helicopter piloted by Ted Moore, with Glen Woods as "kicker", shot down an An-2s biplane ("An Air Combat First") during the Battle of Lima Site 85.
- On January 16, 1969, a Douglas C-47A "949" crashed in the Hai Van Pass, 18 miles (29 km) south of Huế, South Vietnam. The aircraft was on a domestic cargo flight from Phu Bai International Airport to Da Nang International Airport. All 12 passengers and crew were killed.
- On February 22, 1970, a H34 Helicopter had just finished delivering supplies to Meo forces defending Xieng Khousang airfield, Vientlane Laos, when it was fired upon by sniper fire; Pilot R. C. Maerkl of Ft Worth Texas was killed; co-pilot John Ford took control of helicopter and landed at a US Government airstrip.
- On December 27, 1971, a C-123K from Udorn Airfield, Kingdom of Thailand, headed for Xienhom District, Xaignabouli Province, Laos. The aircraft was on a routine resupply mission for U.S. Agency for International Development and was last heard from when they were northeast of Sayaboury. Laos. The plane and four crewmen were missing. On September 25, 2018, the remains of pilot George L. Ritter; co-pilot Roy F. Townley and crewman Edward J. Weissenback were accounted for.
- In the spring of 1972, a C-7A Caribou loaded with Nationalist Lao Troops experienced a simultaneous twin engine failure on final approach. Both pilots were seriously injured. Sabotage was suspected.
- On December 29, 1973, a Douglas C-53D EM-3 overran the runway on landing at Dalat Airport, South Vietnam. The aircraft was substantially damaged and was not salvaged due to the presence of land mines in the area. It was operating a non-scheduled passenger flight. All nine people on board survived.
- On April 29, 1975, a Douglas VC-47A 084 crashed on landing at U-Tapao Royal Thai Navy Airfield, Sattahip, Thailand. The aircraft was on a flight from Tan Son Nhat International Airport, Saigon, Vietnam.

== See also ==
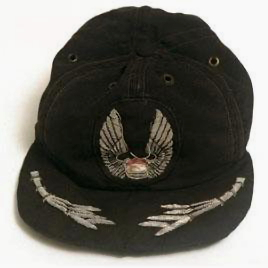
Air America pilot's cap

- List of defunct airlines of the United States
- 1st American Volunteer Group, a World War II unit known as "The Flying Tigers"
- Battle of Lima Site 85
- Lao Veterans of America
- Eugene DeBruin
- Pisidhi Indradat
- Front organization
- North Vietnamese invasion of Laos
- Pathet Lao
- Continental Air Services, Inc
- Intermountain Aviation
- Evergreen International Airlines
- Northwest Orient Airlines
