= List of Latin American Academy Award winners and nominees =

This is a list of Latin American Academy Award winners and nominees by category. Each list details the performances of Latin American-born filmmakers, actors, actresses and films that have either been nominated for or won an Academy Award.

This list is current as of the 98th Academy Awards ceremony held on March 15, 2026.

== Best Picture ==
Best Picture
Year	Nominee	Country	Film	Result	Ref.
2006	Alejandro González Iñárritu	(Mexico)	Babel	Nominated	
2013	Alfonso Cuarón	(Mexico)	Gravity	Nominated	
2014	Alejandro González Iñárritu	(Mexico)	Birdman	Won	
2015	Alejandro González Iñárritu	(Mexico)	The Revenant	Nominated	
2017	Guillermo del Toro	(Mexico)	The Shape of Water	Won	
2018	Alfonso Cuarón	(Mexico)	Roma	Nominated	
2018	Gabriela Rodríguez	(Venezuela)	Roma	Nominated	
2021	Guillermo del Toro	(Mexico)	Nightmare Alley	Nominated	
2024	Maria Carlota Bruno; Rodrigo Teixeira	(Brazil)	I'm Still Here	Nominated	
2025	Guillermo del Toro	(Mexico)	Frankenstein	Nominated	

== Best Director ==
Best Director
Year	Nominee	Country	Film	Result	Ref.
1985	Héctor Babenco	(Argentina) / (Brazil)	Kiss of the Spider Woman	Nominated	
2003	Fernando Meirelles	(Brazil)	City of God	Nominated	
2006	Alejandro González Iñárritu	(Mexico)	Babel	Nominated	
2013	Alfonso Cuarón	(Mexico)	Gravity	Won	
2014	Alejandro González Iñárritu	(Mexico)	Birdman	Won	
2015	Alejandro González Iñárritu	(Mexico)	The Revenant	Won	
2017	Guillermo del Toro	(Mexico)	The Shape of Water	Won	
2018	Alfonso Cuarón	(Mexico)	Roma	Won	

== Acting ==
=== Best Actor ===
Best Actor
Year	Nominee	Country	Film	Result	Ref.
1950	José Ferrer	(Puerto Rico)	Cyrano de Bergerac	Won	
1952	José Ferrer	(Puerto Rico)	Moulin Rouge	Nominated	
1957	Anthony Quinn	(Mexico)	Wild Is the Wind	Nominated	
1964	Anthony Quinn	(Mexico)	Zorba the Greek	Nominated	
2011	Demián Bichir	(Mexico)	A Better Life	Nominated	
2025	Wagner Moura	(Brazil)	The Secret Agent	Nominated	

=== Best Actress ===
Best Actress
Year	Nominee	Country	Film	Result	Ref.
1998	Fernanda Montenegro	(Brazil)	Central Station	Nominated	
2002	Salma Hayek	(Mexico)	Frida	Nominated	
2004	Catalina Sandino Moreno	(Colombia)	Maria Full of Grace	Nominated	
2018	Yalitza Aparicio	(Mexico)	Roma	Nominated	
2022	Ana de Armas	(Cuba)	Blonde	Nominated	
2024	Fernanda Torres	(Brazil)	I'm Still Here	Nominated	

=== Best Supporting Actor ===
Best Supporting Actor
Year	Nominee	Country	Film	Result	Ref.
1948	José Ferrer	(Puerto Rico)	Joan of Arc	Nominated	
1952	Anthony Quinn	(Mexico)	Viva Zapata!	Won	
1956	Anthony Quinn	(Mexico)	Lust for Life	Won	
1990	Andy García	(Cuba)	The Godfather Part III	Nominated	
2000	Benicio del Toro	(Puerto Rico)	Traffic	Won	
2003	Benicio del Toro	(Puerto Rico)	21 Grams	Nominated	
2025	Benicio del Toro	(Puerto Rico)	One Battle After Another	Nominated	

=== Best Supporting Actress ===
Best Supporting Actress
Year	Nominee	Country	Film	Result	Ref.
1954	Katy Jurado	(Mexico)	Broken Lance	Nominated	
1961	Rita Moreno	(Puerto Rico)	West Side Story	Won	
1987	Norma Aleandro	(Argentina)	Gaby: A True Story	Nominated	
2006	Adriana Barraza	(Mexico)	Babel	Nominated	
2011	Bérénice Bejo	(Argentina)	The Artist	Nominated	
2013	Lupita Nyong'o	(Mexico)	12 Years a Slave	Won	
2018	Marina de Tavira	(Mexico)	Roma	Nominated	

== Best Casting ==
Best Casting
Year	Nominee	Country	Film	Status	Notes	Ref(s)
2025 (98th)	Gabriel Domingues	(Brazil)	The Secret Agent	Nominated	First Brazilian-born and Latino casting director to be nominated for Best Casting.	

== Best Cinematography ==
This list focuses on Latin American-born cinematographers.

Best Cinematography
Year	Nominee	Country	Film	Status	Milestone / Notes
1964	Gabriel Figueroa	(Mexico)	The Night of the Iguana	Nominated	The Academy Award category was "Best Cinematography – Black-and-White".
1995	Emmanuel Lubezki	(Mexico)	A Little Princess	Nominated	
1999	Emmanuel Lubezki	(Mexico)	Sleepy Hollow	Nominated	
2003	César Charlone	(Uruguay)	City of God	Nominated	Charlone is Uruguayan, but is based in Brazil.
2005	Emmanuel Lubezki	(Mexico)	The New World	Nominated	
2005	Rodrigo Prieto	(Mexico)	Brokeback Mountain	Nominated	
2006	Emmanuel Lubezki	(Mexico)	Children of Men	Nominated	
2006	Guillermo Navarro	(Mexico)	Pan's Labyrinth	Won	(original title: El laberinto del fauno) First Latin American and Mexican cinematographer to win an Academy Award.
2008	Claudio Miranda	(Chile)	The Curious Case of Benjamin Button	Nominated	
2011	Emmanuel Lubezki	(Mexico)	The Tree of Life	Nominated	
2012	Claudio Miranda	(Chile)	Life of Pi	Won	
2013	Emmanuel Lubezki	(Mexico)	Gravity	Won	
2014	Emmanuel Lubezki	(Mexico)	Birdman	Won	First Latin American cinematographer to win consecutive Academy Awards.
2015	Emmanuel Lubezki	(Mexico)	The Revenant	Won	First person to win this award in three consecutive years. First Latin American cinematographer to win three Academy Awards.
2016	Rodrigo Prieto	(Mexico)	Silence	Nominated	
2018	Alfonso Cuarón	(Mexico)	Roma	Won	First Latin American and Mexican director to be nominated for Best Cinematography while serving as both director and cinematographer. First Latin American and Mexican director to win for Best Director and Best Cinematography in the same year.
2019	Rodrigo Prieto	(Mexico)	The Irishman	Nominated	
2023	Rodrigo Prieto	(Mexico)	Killers of the Flower Moon	Nominated	
2025	Adolpho Veloso	(Brazil)	Train Dreams	Nominated	First Brazilian to be nominated

== Best Costume Design ==
This list focuses on Latin American-born costume designers.

Best Costume Design
Year	Nominee	Country	Film	Status	Milestone / Notes
2019	Mayes C. Rubeo	(Mexico)	Jojo Rabbit	Nominated	

== Best Documentary Feature ==
This list focuses on documentary features directed by Latin American-born filmmakers.

Best Documentary Feature
Year	Nominee	Country	Film	Status	Milestone / Notes
1957	Manuel Barbachano Ponce	(Mexico)	Torero!	Nominated	
1981	Tetê Vasconcellos	(Brazil)	El Salvador: Another Vietnam	Nominated	Shared with Glenn Silber.
1985	Susana Blaustein Muñoz; Lourdes Portillo	(Argentina) (Mexico)	The Mothers of Plaza de Mayo	Nominated	
2014	Juliano Ribeiro Salgado	(Brazil)	The Salt of the Earth	Nominated	Shared with Wim Wenders and producer David Rosier.
2016	Raoul Peck; Hébert Peck	(Haiti)	I Am Not Your Negro	Nominated	Shared with Rémi Grellety
2019	Petra Costa; Tiago Pavan	(Brazil)	The Edge of Democracy	Nominated	Shared with Joanna Natasegara and Shane Boris.
2020	Maite Alberdi; Marcela Santibáñez	(Chile)	The Mole Agent	Nominated	
2023	Maite Alberdi	(Chile)	The Eternal Memory	Nominated	

== Best Documentary Short Subject ==
This list focuses on documentary short subject directed by Latin American-born filmmakers.

Best Documentary Short Subject
Year	Nominee	Country	Film	Status	Milestone / Notes
1971	Manuel Arango	(Mexico)	Sentinels of Silence	Won	This was the only time that a short film won the Academy Award in two categories, having also won for Best Short Subject.
1980	Jorge Preloran	(Argentina)	Luther Metke at 94	Nominated	Shared with producer Richard Hawkins.
2007	Isabel Vega	(Colombia)	The Crown	Nominated	Shared with director Amanda Micheli
2014	Gabriel Serra Argüello	(Nicaragua)	The Reaper	Nominated	
2021	Pedro Kos	(Brazil)	Lead Me Home	Nominated	Shared with director Jon Shenk.

== Best Film Editing ==
This list focuses on Latin American-born film editors.

Best Film Editing
Year	Nominee	Country	Film	Status	Notes	Ref(s)
2003 (76th)	Daniel Rezende	(Brazil)	City of God	Nominated	First Brazilian-born and Latino editor to be nominated for Best Film Editing.	
2006 (79th)	Alfonso Cuarón; Álex Rodríguez	(Mexico)	Children of Men	Nominated	First Mexican editors to be nominated. French-born Mexican editor (Rodríguez).	
2013 (86th)	Alfonso Cuarón	(Mexico)	Gravity	Won	First Mexican-born editor to win Best Film Editing. Shared with Mark Sanger.	

== Best International Feature Film ==
Best Foreign Language Film
Year	Film	Director	Country	Status	Milestone / Notes
1960	Macario	Roberto Gavaldón	(Mexico)	Nominated	First Latin American film to be nominated for Best Foreign Language Film.
1961	The Important Man	Ismael Rodríguez	(Mexico)	Nominated	(original title: Ánimas Trujano)
1962	Keeper of Promises	Anselmo Duarte	(Brazil)	Nominated	(original title: O Pagador de Promessas)
1962	The Pearl of Tlayucan	Luis Alcoriza	(Mexico)	Nominated	(original title: Tlayucan)
1974	The Truce	Sergio Renán	(Argentina)	Nominated	(original title: La tregua)
1975	Letters from Marusia	Miguel Littin	(Chile)	Nominated	(original title: Actas de Marusia)
1982	Alsino and the Condor	Miguel Littin	(Chile)	Nominated	(original title: Alsino y el cóndor); Second nomination for Best Foreign Language Film to a film directed by Chilean Miguel Littín. Only Latin American director to receive nominations for films directed in two different countries.
1984	Camila	María Luisa Bemberg	(Argentina)	Nominated	First nomination for Best Foreign Language Film to a film directed by a Latin American woman director.
1985	The Official Story	Luis Puenzo	(Argentina)	Won	(original title: La historia oficial); First Latin American film to win for Best Foreign Language Film. The film was also nominated for Best Original Screenplay.
1989	What Happened to Santiago	Jacobo Morales	(Puerto Rico)	Nominated	(original title: Lo que le pasó a Santiago)
~~1992~~	~~A Place in the World~~	~~Adolfo Aristarain~~	(Uruguay)	Nominated (Disqualified)	(original title: Un lugar en el mundo); After nominations were announced, information came to light that showed that the film was wholly produced in Argentina, and had insufficient Uruguayan artistic control. The film was declared ineligible and removed from the final ballot.
1994	Strawberry and Chocolate	Tomás Gutiérrez Alea and Juan Carlos Tabío	(Cuba)	Nominated	(original title: Fresa y chocolate); First and only Cuban film to be nominated for Best Foreign Language Film.
1995	O Quatrilho	Fábio Barreto	(Brazil)	Nominated	Second Brazilian film nominated to the award in over 30 years.
1997	Four Days in September	Bruno Barreto	(Brazil)	Nominated	(original title: O Que É Isso Companheiro?)
1998	Central Station	Walter Salles	(Brazil)	Nominated	(original title: Central do Brasil); The film was also nominated for Best Actress.
1998	Tango	Carlos Saura	(Argentina)	Nominated	(original title: Tango, no me dejes nunca)
2000	Amores perros	Alejandro González Iñárritu	(Mexico)	Nominated	
2001	Son of the Bride	Juan José Campanella	(Argentina)	Nominated	(original title: El hijo de la novia)
2002	El crimen del padre Amaro	Carlos Carrera	(Mexico)	Nominated	
2004	The Sea Inside	Alejandro Amenábar	(Chile)	Won	(original title: Mar adentro)
2006	Pan's Labyrinth	Guillermo del Toro	(Mexico)	Nominated	(original title: El laberinto del fauno); The film was nominated for other five Academy Awards: Best Adapted Screenplay, Best Original Score, Best Art Direction, Best Cinematography and Best Makeup, and won the last three of them.
2009	The Milk of Sorrow	Claudia Llosa	(Peru)	Nominated	(original title: La teta asustada); First, and only, Peruvian Film to be nominated for Best Foreign Language Film.
2009	The Secret in Their Eyes	Juan José Campanella	(Argentina)	Won	(original title: El secreto de sus ojos); Second nomination for Best Foreign Language Film to a film directed by Juan José Campanella, and first to win. Second Argentine, and Latin American, film to win for Best Foreign Language Film.
2010	Biutiful	Alejandro González Iñárritu	(Mexico)	Nominated	Second nomination for Best Foreign Language Film to a film directed by Alejandro González Iñárritu. The film was also nominated for Best Actor.
2012	No	Pablo Larraín	(Chile)	Nominated	First Chilean Film to be nominated for Best Foreign Language Film.
2014	Wild Tales	Damián Szifron	(Argentina)	Nominated	(original title: Relatos salvajes)
2015	Embrace of the Serpent	Ciro Guerra	(Colombia)	Nominated	(original title: El abrazo de la serpiente); First Colombian film to be nominated for Best Foreign Language Film.
2017	A Fantastic Woman	Sebastián Lelio	(Chile)	Won	(original title: Una mujer fantástica); First Chilean film to win the Best Foreign Language Film award.
2018	Roma	Alfonso Cuarón	(Mexico)	Won	First Latin American film to be simultaneously nominated for Best Picture and Best Foreign Language Film.
2022	Argentina, 1985	Santiago Mitre	(Argentina)	Nominated	
2024	I'm Still Here	Walter Salles	(Brazil)	Won	(original title: Ainda estou aqui); First Academy Award for Brazil. The film was also nominated for Best Picture and Best Actress. First Portuguese-language film to be nominated for an Oscar for Best Picture.
2025	The Secret Agent	Kleber Mendonça Filho	(Brazil)	Nominated	(original title: O Agente Secreto); The film was also nominated for Best Picture, Best Actor and Best Casting. Second Portuguese-language film to be nominated for an Oscar for Best Picture.

== Best Animated Feature ==
This list focuses on animated features directed by Latin American-born filmmakers.

Best Animated Feature
Year	Nominee	Country	Film	Status	Notes	Ref(s)
2015 (88th)	Alê Abreu	(Brazil)	Boy and the World	Nominated	First Latin American film to be nominated for Best Animated Feature.	
2017 (90th)	Carlos Saldanha	(Brazil)	Ferdinand	Nominated		
2021 (94th)	Carlos López Estrada	(Mexico)	Raya and the Last Dragon	Nominated		
2022 (95th)	Guillermo del Toro	(Mexico)	Guillermo del Toro's Pinocchio	Won		
2025 (95th)	Nidia Santiago	(Mexico)	Little Amélie or the Character of Rain	Nominated	Shared with Maïlys Vallade, Liane-Cho Han, and Henri Magalon	

== Best Live Action Short Film ==
This list focuses on live action short films directed/produced by Latin American-born filmmakers.

Best Live Action Short Film
Year	Nominee	Country	Film	Status	Notes	Ref(s)
1971 (44th)	Manuel Arango	(Mexico)	Sentinels of Silence	Won	First and only time a short film won Academy Awards in two different categories.	
1976 (49th)	André Gutffreund	(El Salvador)	In the Region of Ice	Won	Shared with director Peter Werner.	
1996 (69th)	Antonio Urrutia	(Mexico)	De tripas, corazón	Nominated		
2000 (73rd)	Paulo Machline	(Brazil)	Uma História de Futebol	Nominated		
2021 (94th)	K.D. Dávila	(Mexico)	Please Stay	Nominated		
2022 (95th)	Alfonso Cuarón	(Mexico)	Le pupille	Nominated	Shared with Alice Rohrwacher	

== Best Animated Short Film ==
This list focuses on animated short films directed by Latin American-born filmmakers.

Best Animated Short Film
Year	Nominee	Country	Film	Status	Notes	Ref(s)
1994 (67th)	Vanessa Schwartz	(Chile)	The Janitor	Nominated		
2003 (76th)	Carlos Saldanha	(Brazil)	Gone Nutty	Nominated	First Animated Short Film directed by a Latin American director to receive an Academy Award nomination.	
2009 (82nd)	Nicolas Schmerkin	(Argentina)	Logorama	Won		
2015 (88th)	Pato Escala Pierart; Gabriel Osorio Vargas	(Chile)	Bear Story	Won	First Latin American Animated Short to be nominated for and win an Academy Award.	
2021 (94th)	Hugo Covarrubias; Tevo Díaz	(Chile)	Bestia	Nominated		

== Best Makeup ==
This list focuses on Latin American-born makeup artists.

Best Makeup and Hairstyling
Year	Nominee	Country	Film	Status	Notes	Ref(s)
2008 (81st)	Mike Elizalde	(Mexico)	Hellboy II: The Golden Army	Nominated		

== Best Music – Original Score ==
This list focuses on scores by Latin American-born composers.

Best Original Score
Year	Nominee	Country	Film	Status	Milestone / Notes
1966	Luis Bacalov	(Argentina)	The Gospel According to St. Matthew	Nominated	(original title: Il Vangelo secondo Matteo)
1967	Lalo Schifrin	(Argentina)	Cool Hand Luke	Nominated	
1968	Lalo Schifrin	(Argentina)	The Fox	Nominated	The Academy Award category was "Best Music, Original Score for a Motion Picture (not a Musical)".
1970	Bill Melendez	(Mexico)	A Boy Named Charlie Brown	Nominated	The Academy Award category was "Best Music, Original Song Score."; Shared nomination with Rod McKuen, John Scott Trotter, Al Shean, and Vince Guaraldi.
1970	Herbert W. Spencer	(Chile)	Scrooge	Nominated	The Academy Award category was "Best Music, Original Song Score". Shared nomination with English-born Leslie Bricusse and Ian Fraser.
1973	Herbert W. Spencer	(Chile)	Jesus Christ Superstar	Nominated	The Academy Award category was "Best Music, Scoring Original Song Score and/or Adaptation". Shared nomination with English-born Andrew Lloyd Webber and German-American André Previn.
1976	Lalo Schifrin	(Argentina)	Voyage of the Damned	Nominated	
1979	Lalo Schifrin	(Argentina)	The Amityville Horror	Nominated	
1983	Lalo Schifrin	(Argentina)	The Sting II	Nominated	The Academy Award category was "Best Music, Original Song Score and Its Adaptation or Best Adaptation Score".
1985	Jorge Calandrelli	(Argentina)	The Color Purple	Nominated	Nominated with eleven other composers.
1995	Luis Bacalov	(Argentina)	The Postman	Won	(original title: Il Postino). The Academy Award category was "Best Music, Original Dramatic Score".
2005	Gustavo Santaolalla	(Argentina)	Brokeback Mountain	Won	Fourth composer to win two years in a row.
2006	Gustavo Santaolalla	(Argentina)	Babel	Won	Fourth composer to win two years in a row.

== Best Music – Original Song ==
This list focuses on songs by Latin American-born composers and/or lyricists.

Best Original Song
Year	Nominee	Country	Film	Song	Status	Milestone / Notes
1942	Ernesto Lecuona	(Cuba)	Always in My Heart	"Always in My Heart"	Nominated	First Hispanic person (along with Emile Kuri) to be nominated in any category. First person from a Caribbean country to be nominated in any category. Nominated with American Kim Gannon.
1944	Ary Barroso	(Brazil)	Brazil	"Rio de Janeiro"	Nominated	First Brazilian and Latin-American songwriter to be nominated. Nominated with American Ned Washington.
1981	Lalo Schifrin	(Argentina)	The Competition	"People Alone"	Nominated	First Argentinean to be nominated. Nominated with American Will Jennings.
2000	Jorge Calandrelli	(Argentina)	Crouching Tiger, Hidden Dragon	"A Love Before Time"	Nominated	(original title: Wo hu cang long); Nominated with Chinese Tan Dun and American James Schamus.
2004	Jorge Drexler	(Uruguay)	The Motorcycle Diaries	"Al otro lado del río"	Won	(original title: Diarios de motocicleta); First Uruguayan to be nominated and win an Academy Award.
2011	Sergio Mendes; Carlinhos Brown	(Brazil)	Rio	"Real in Rio"	Nominated	First two Brazilian songwriters to be nominated together. Brown is the first black Latin songwriter to be nominated. Nominated with American Siedah Garrett.

== Best Production Design ==
This list focuses on Latin American-born production designers and set decorators.

Best Production Design
Year	Nominee	Country	Film	Status	Milestone / Notes
1942	Emile Kuri	(Mexico)	Silver Queen	Nominated	First Hispanic person (along with Ernesto Lecuona) to be nominated in any category. Nominated with Ralph Berger.
1949	Emile Kuri	(Mexico)	The Heiress	Won	Nominated with Harry Horner and John Meehan.
1949	Edward Carrere	(Mexico)	Adventures of Don Juan	Nominated	Nominated with Lyle Reifsnider.
1952	Emile Kuri	(Mexico)	Carrie	Nominated	Nominated with Roland Anderson and Hal Pereira.
1954	Emile Kuri	(Mexico)	20,000 Leagues Under the Sea	Won	Nominated with John Meehan.
1954	Emile Kuri	(Mexico)	Executive Suite	Nominated	Nominated with Edward Carfagno, Cedric Gibbons and Edwin B. Willis.
1960	Edward Carrere	(Mexico)	Sunrise at Campobello	Nominated	Nominated with George James Hopkins.
1961	Emile Kuri	(Mexico)	The Absent-Minded Professor	Nominated	Nominated with Carroll Clark and Hal Gausman.
1964	Emile Kuri	(Mexico)	Mary Poppins	Nominated	Nominated with Carroll Clark, Hal Gausman and William H. Tuntke.
1967	Edward Carrere	(Mexico)	Camelot	Won	Nominated with John Truscott and John W. Brown.
1971	Emile Kuri	(Mexico)	Bedknobs and Broomsticks	Nominated	Nominated with Peter Ellenshaw, Hal Gausman and John B. Mansbridge.
1995	Eugenio Zanetti	(Argentina)	Restoration	Won	
1996	Brigitte Broch	(Mexico)	Romeo + Juliet	Nominated	Broch is a German-born Mexican art director. Nominated with Catherine Martin.
1998	Eugenio Zanetti	(Argentina)	What Dreams May Come	Nominated	Nominated with Cindy Carr.
2001	Brigitte Broch	(Mexico)	Moulin Rouge!	Won	Nominated with Catherine Martin.
2002	Felipe Fernández del Paso; Hania Robledo	(Mexico)	Frida	Nominated	
2006	Eugenio Caballero	(Mexico)	Pan's Labyrinth	Won	Nominated with Pilar Revuelta.
2018	Eugenio Caballero; Bárbara Enríquez	(Mexico)	Roma	Nominated	

== Best Sound or Sound Mixing ==
This list focuses on Latin American-born sound engineers.

Best Sound Mixing
Year	Nominee	Country	Film	Status	Notes	Ref(s)
2006 (79th)	Fernando Cámara	(Mexico)	Apocalypto	Nominated	First Mexican-born and Latino / Hispanic to be nominated for Best Sound Mixing.	
2012 (85th)	José Antonio García	(Mexico)	Argo	Nominated	Shared with John T. Reitz and Gregg Rudloff.	
2018 (91st)	José Antonio García	(Mexico)	Roma	Nominated	Shared with Skip Lievsay and Craig Henighan.	
2020 (93rd)	Jaime Baksht; Michelle Couttolenc; Carlos Cortés	(Mexico)	Sound of Metal	Won	Shared with Nicolas Becker and Phillip Bladh.	
2025 (98th)	José Antonio García	(Mexico)	One Battle After Another	Nominated	Shared with Christopher Scarabosio and Tony Villaflor.	
2025 (98th)	Felipe Pacheco	(Costa Rica)	Sinners	Nominated	Shared with Chris Welcker, Benjamin A. Burtt, Brandon Proctor, and Steve Boeddeker	

== Best Sound Editing ==
This list focuses on Latin American-born sound editors.

Best Sound Editing
Year	Nominee	Country	Film	Status	Notes	Ref(s)
2014 (87th)	Martín Hernández	(Mexico)	Birdman	Nominated	Shared with Aaron Glascock.	
2015 (88th)	Martín Hernández	(Mexico)	The Revenant	Nominated	Shared with Lon Bender.	
2018 (91st)	Sergio Díaz	(Mexico)	Roma	Nominated	Shared with Skip Lievsay.	

== Best Visual Effects ==
Best Visual Effects
Year	Nominee	Country	Film	Status	Milestone / Notes
1947	Paul Lerpae	(Mexico)	Unconquered	Nominated	Nomination shared with Farciot Edouart, Devereaux Jennings, Gordon Jennings, Wallace Kelley and George Dutton.
2002	Pablo Helman	(Argentina)	Star Wars: Episode II – Attack of the Clones	Nominated	Nomination shared with Rob Coleman, John Knoll and Ben Snow.
2005	Pablo Helman	(Argentina)	War of the Worlds	Nominated	Nomination shared with Randal M. Dutra, Dennis Muren and Dan Sudick.
2019	Pablo Helman; Leandro Estebecorena; Nelson Sepulveda-Fauser	(Argentina)	The Irishman	Nominated	Nomination shared with Stéphane Grabli.
2024	Nelson Sepulveda-Fauser	(Argentina)	Alien: Romulus	Nominated	Shared with Eric Barba, Daniel Macarin and Shane Mahan.
2024	Pablo Helman	(Argentina)	Wicked	Nominated	Shared with Jonathan Fawkner, David Shirk and Paul Corbould.

== Best Adapted Screenplay ==
This list focuses on Latin American-born screenplay writers.

Best Adapted Screenplay
Year	Nominee	Country	Film	Status	Notes	Ref(s)
2003 (76th)	Bráulio Mantovani	(Brazil)	City of God	Nominated	First Brazilian-born screenwriter to be nominated for Best Screenplay (Adapted or Original).	
2004 (77th)	José Rivera	(Puerto Rico)	The Motorcycle Diaries	Nominated	First Puerto Rican-born screenwriter to be nominated for Best Screenplay (Adapted or Original).	
2006 (79th)	Alfonso Cuarón	(Mexico)	Children of Men	Nominated	First Mexican-born screenwriter to be nominated for Best Adapted Screenplay.	
2025 (98th)	Guillermo del Toro	(Mexico)	Frankenstein	Nominated		

== Best Original Screenplay ==
This list focuses on Latin American-born screenplay writers.

Best Original Screenplay
Year	Nominee	Country	Film	Status	Notes	Ref(s)
1985 (58th)	Aída Bortnik; Luis Puenzo	(Argentina)	The Official Story	Nominated	First Argentine-born screenwriters to be nominated for Best Screenplay (Adapted or Original).	
2002 (75th)	Alfonso Cuarón; Carlos Cuarón	(Mexico)	Y Tu Mamá También	Nominated	First Mexican-born screenwriters to be nominated for Best Screenplay (Adapted or Original).	
2006 (79th)	Guillermo Arriaga	(Mexico)	Babel	Nominated		
2006 (79th)	Guillermo del Toro	(Mexico)	Pan's Labyrinth	Nominated		
2014 (87th)	Alejandro González Iñárritu; Nicolás Giacobone; Armando Bó	(Mexico) (Argentina) (Argentina)	Birdman	Won	First Mexican-born screenwriter to win for Best Original Screenplay (Iñárritu). First Argentine-born screenwriters to win Best Original Screenplay (Giacobone and Bó). Shared with Alexander Dinelaris Jr.	
2017 (90th)	Guillermo del Toro	(Mexico)	The Shape of Water	Nominated	Shared with Vanessa Taylor.	
2018 (91st)	Alfonso Cuarón	(Mexico)	Roma	Nominated		

== Best Story ==
This list focuses on Latin American-born screenplay writers.

Best Story
Year	Nominee	Country	Film	Status	Notes	Ref(s)
1930/1931 (4th)	Harry d'Abbadie d'Arrast	(Argentina)	Laughter	Nominated	Argentine-born French screenwriter. Nomination shared with Douglas Z. Doty and Donald Ogden Stewart.	

Note: Defunct category.

== Special awards ==
Honorary Award
Year	Nominee	Country	Status	Notes	Ref(s)
2018 (91st)	Lalo Schifrin	(Argentina)	Recipient	First Latino and Argentine to receive this award.	

Special Achievement Academy Award
Year	Nominee	Country	Film	Status	Notes	Ref(s)
2017 (90th)	Alejandro González Iñárritu	(Mexico)	Flesh and Sand	Recipient	First Latino and Mexican to receive this award.	

== By decade ==
=== All categories ===
Decade	1930s	1940s	1950s	1960s	1970s	1980s	1990s	2000s	2010s	2020s	Total
Wins	-	1	4	2	3	1	2	9	18	3	43
Nominations	1	6	6	12	8	12	13	34	31	26	149
Total nominations	1	7	10	14	11	13	15	43	49	29	192

Note: Each win and nomination in a category in a given year counts only once, regardless of whether a win or a nomination was shared among multiple Latin Americans.

=== Acting nominations ===
Decade	1940s	1950s	1960s	1980s	1990s	2000s	2010s	2020s	Total
Actor	-	3	1	-	-	-	1	1	6
Actress	-	-	-	-	1	2	1	2	6
Supp. Actor	1	2	-	-	1	2	-	1	7
Supp. Actress	-	1	1	1	-	1	3	-	7
Total	1	6	2	1	2	5	5	4	26

== By country ==
Rank	Country	No. of wins	No. of nominations
1	Mexico*	27	95
2	Argentina*	8	36
3	Chile	4	14
4	Puerto Rico	3	9
5	Brazil	1	25
6	Uruguay	1	2
7	El Salvador	1	1
8	Cuba	0	4
9	Colombia	0	3
10	Costa Rica	0	1
10	Haiti	0	1
10	Peru	0	1
10	Nicaragua	0	1
10	Venezuela	0	1
11	Bolivia	0	0
11	Dominican Republic	0	0
11	Ecuador	0	0
11	Guatemala	0	0
11	Honduras	0	0
11	Panama	0	0
11	Paraguay	0	0

* "No. of wins" column excludes Special Award.

Note: This list only includes individuals born in Latin America. See List of Hispanic Academy Award winners and nominees for individuals of Hispanic descent born outside Latin America, including the United States, who have either been nominated for or won an Academy Award.

== See also ==
- Lists of Hispanic Academy Award winners and nominees by country
