= Lists of Latin American Academy Award winners and nominees by country =

Each list below details the performances of Latin American–born filmmakers, actors, actresses and films that have either been summitted and nominated for or won an Academy Award. These lists are current as of the 97th Academy Awards ceremony held on March 2, 2025.

- List of Argentine Academy Award winners and nominees
- List of Brazilian Academy Award winners and nominees
- List of Chilean Academy Award winners and nominees
- List of Colombian Academy Award winners and nominees
- List of Cuban Academy Award winners and nominees
- List of Hispanic Academy Award winners and nominees
- List of Latin American Academy Award winners and nominees
- List of Mexican Academy Award winners and nominees
- List of Puerto Rican Academy Award winners and nominees
- List of Spanish Academy Award winners and nominees
