= List of Hispanic Academy Award winners and nominees =

This is a list of Hispanic Academy Award winners and nominees by category. It lists the performances of actors, actresses, and filmmakers of Hispanic descent born outside Latin America, Equatorial Guinea, or Spain who have been nominated for or have won an Academy Award, along with the flag of the country of their Hispanic ancestry.

This list is current as of the 98th Academy Awards ceremony held on March 15, 2026.

== Best Picture ==
=== Best Picture ===
Academy Award for Best Picture
| Year | Nominee | Country/ territory | Film | Status | Notes |
| 2021 (93rd) | Shaka King | Panama | Judas and the Black Messiah | Nominated | First American producer of Hispanic descent to be nominated for Best Picture. Born in New York to a Panamanian father and a mother of Panamanian descent. Shared with Ryan Coogler and Charles D. King. |

== Acting categories ==
=== Best Actor ===
Academy Award for Best Actor
| Year | Nominee | Country/ territory | Film | Status | Notes |
| 1988 (61st) | Edward James Olmos | Mexico | Stand and Deliver | Nominated | First American actor of Hispanic descent to be nominated for Best Actor. Born in California to Mexican parents. |
| 2023 (96th) | Colman Domingo | Guatemala | Rustin | Nominated | Born in Pennsylvania to a Guatemalan father. First Afro-Latino nominated for Best Actor. First openly gay Hispanic and Latino to be nominated for Best Actor. |
| 2024 (97th) | Colman Domingo | Guatemala | Sing Sing | Nominated | Born in Pennsylvania to a Guatemalan father. First Afro-Latino nominated for Best Actor. First openly gay Hispanic and Latino to be nominated for Best Actor. |

=== Best Actress ===
Academy Award for Best Actress
| Year | Nominee | Country | Film | Status | Notes |
| 1999 (72nd) | Hilary Swank | Mexico | Boys Don't Cry | Won | First American actress of Hispanic descent to have won twice. Maternal grandmother was of Mexican descent. |
| 2004 (77th) | Hilary Swank | Mexico | Million Dollar Baby | Won | First American actress of Hispanic descent to have won twice. Maternal grandmother was of Mexican descent. |
| 2012 (94th) | Jessica Chastain | Spain | Zero Dark Thirty | Nominated | First American actress of Spanish descent to win. |
| 2021 (94th) | Jessica Chastain | Spain | The Eyes of Tammy Faye | Won | First American actress of Spanish descent to win. |

=== Best Supporting Actor ===
Academy Award for Best Supporting Actor
| Year | Nominee | Country/ territory | Film | Status | Notes |
| 1947 (20th) | Thomas Gomez | Spain | Ride the Pink Horse | Nominated | First and (to date) only American actor of Hispanic descent to be nominated for Best Supporting Actor. Born in New York to Spanish-born father. |

=== Best Supporting Actress ===
Academy Award for Best Supporting Actress
| Year | Nominee | Country/ territory | Film | Status | Notes |
| 1959 (32nd) | Susan Kohner | Mexico | Imitation of Life | Nominated | Born in California to a Mexican mother. |
| 1991 (64th) | Mercedes Ruehl | Cuba | The Fisher King | Won | Maternal grandfather was Cuban. |
| 1993 (66th) | Rosie Perez | Puerto Rico | Fearless | Nominated | Born in New York to Puerto Rican parents. |
| 2011 (84th) | Jessica Chastain | Spain | The Help | Nominated | Paternal grandfather was of Spanish descent. |
| 2021 (94th) | Ariana DeBose | Puerto Rico | West Side Story | Won | Born in North Carolina to a Puerto Rican father. First Afro-Latina to be nominated for and win an acting Oscar. |
| 2023 (96th) | America Ferrera | Honduras | Barbie | Nominated | Born in California to Honduran-born parents. |
| 2024 (97th) | Monica Barbaro | Mexico; Nicaragua | A Complete Unknown | Nominated | Born in California to a mother of Mexican and Nicaraguan descent. |
| 2024 (97th) | Zoe Saldaña | Dominican Republic; Puerto Rico | Emilia Pérez | Won | Born in New Jersey to a Dominican-born father and a mother of Puerto Rican and Dominican descent. First person with Dominican ancestry to be nominated for and win an Oscar in any category. |

== Animated categories ==
=== Best Animated Feature ===
Academy Award for Best Animated Feature
| Year | Nominee | Country/ territory | Film | Status | Notes | Ref(s) |
| 2015 (88th) | Jonas Rivera | Mexico | Inside Out | Won | Born in California of Mexican descent. Shared with Pete Docter. | |
| 2018 (91st) | Phil Lord | Cuba | Spider-Man: Into the Spider-Verse | Won | Born in Florida to a Cuban-born mother. Shared with Christopher Miller. | |
| 2019 (92nd) | Jonas Rivera | Mexico | Toy Story 4 | Won | Shared with Josh Cooley and Mark Nielsen. | |
| 2021 (94th) | Yvett Merino | Mexico | Encanto | Won | Born in California to Mexican-born parents. Shared with Jared Bush, Byron Howard, and Clark Spencer. | |
| 2023 (96th) | Phil Lord | Cuba | Spider-Man: Across the Spider-Verse | Nominated | Shared with Christopher Miller. | |
| 2025 (98th) | Adrian Molina | Mexico | Elio | Nominated | Shared with Madeline Sharafian, Domee Shi, and Mary Alice Drumm | |

== Best Cinematography ==
Academy Award for Best Cinematography
| Year | Nominee | Country/ territory | Film | Status | Notes | Ref(s) |
| 1974 (47th) | John A. Alonzo | Mexico | Chinatown | Nominated | Born in Texas of Mexican descent. First American of Hispanic descent to be nominated for Best; Cinematography. | |
| 1977 (50th) | William A. Fraker | Mexico | Looking for Mr. Goodbar | Nominated | Born in California to a Mexico-born mother. First American of Hispanic descent to be nominated for Best Cinematography. | |
| 1978 (51st) | William A. Fraker | Mexico | Heaven Can Wait | Nominated | First American of Hispanic descent to be nominated for Best Cinematography more than once. | |
| 1979 (52nd) | William A. Fraker | Mexico | 1941 | Nominated | First American of Hispanic descent to earn three consecutive nominations for Best Cinematography. | |
| 1983 (56th) | William A. Fraker | Mexico | WarGames | Nominated | | |
| 1985 (58th) | William A. Fraker | Mexico | Murphy's Romance | Nominated | First and (to date) only American of Hispanic descent to be earn five Best Cinematography nominations. | |

== Documentary categories ==
=== Best Documentary (Short Subject) ===
Academy Award for Best Documentary (Short Subject)
| Year | Nominee | Country/ territory | Film | Status | Notes | Ref(s) |
| 1977 (50th) | Moctesuma Esparza | Mexico | Agueda Martinez: Our People, Our Country | Nominated | Born in California to Mexican-born parents. | |
| 2025 (98th) | Juan Arredondo | Colombia | Armed Only with a Camera: The Life and Death of Brent Renaud | Nominated | Born in New Jersey to Colombian-born parents. Shared with Craig Renaud. | |

== Best Makeup and Hairstyling ==
Academy Award for Best Makeup and Hairstyling
| Year | Name | Country/ territory | Film | Status | Milestone / Notes |
| 2002 | Beatrice De Alba | Mexico | Frida | Won | First Hispanic and Latino makeup artist to be nominated for and win Best Makeup. Born in California to Mexican-born parents. Shared with John E. Jackson. |

== Music categories ==
=== Best Original Score ===
Academy Award for Best Original Score
| Year | Nominee | Country/ territory | Film | Status | Notes | Ref(s) |
| 2021 (94th) | Germaine Franco | Mexico | Encanto | Nominated | Born in California to Mexican-born parents. First female Hispanic to be nominated for Best Original Score. | |

=== Best Original Song ===
Academy Award for Best Original Song
| Year | Nominee | Country/ territory | Film | Song | Status | Notes | Ref(s) |
| 1983 (56th) | Irene Cara | Puerto Rico; Cuba | Flashdance | "Flashdance... What a Feeling" | Won | First Hispanic/Latino American songwriter to win Best Original; Song. Born in New York to a Puerto Rican-born father and a mother of Cuban descent. Shared with Giorgio Moroder and Keith Forsey. | |
| 1988 (61st) | Carly Simon | Cuba | Working Girl | "Let the River Run" | Won | Maternal grandmother was Cuban. | |
| 2002 (75th) | Luis Resto | Puerto Rico | 8 Mile | "Lose Yourself" | Won | Born in Michigan to Puerto Rican-born parents. Shared with Eminem and Jeff Bass. | |
| 2016 (89th) | Lin-Manuel Miranda | Puerto Rico | Moana | "How Far I'll Go" | Nominated | Born in New York to Puerto Rican-born parents. First Hispanic songwriter to be nominated for Best Original Song more than once. | |
| 2021 (94th) | Lin-Manuel Miranda | Puerto Rico | Encanto | "Dos Oruguitas" | Nominated | Born in New York to Puerto Rican-born parents. First Hispanic songwriter to be nominated for Best Original Song more than once. | |
| 2024 (97th) | Adrian Quesada | Mexico | Sing Sing | "Like a Bird" | Nominated | Born in Texas. Of Mexican descent | |

== Technical categories ==
=== Best Visual Effects ===
Academy Award for Best Visual Effects
| Year | Nominee | Country/ territory | Film | Status | Notes | Ref(s) |
| 1979 (52nd) | William A. Fraker | Mexico | 1941 | Nominated | Born in California to a Mexican-born mother. Shared with A. D. Flowers and Greg Jein. | |

=== Best Sound ===
Academy Award for Best Sound
| Year | Nominee | Country/ territory | Film | Status | Notes | Ref(s) |
| 2026 (98th) | Juan Peralta | Dominican Republic | F1 | Won | Shared with Gareth John, Al Nelson, Gwendolyn Yates Whittle and Gary A Rizzo. | |

== Screenplay categories ==
=== Best Original Screenplay ===
Academy Award for Best Original Screenplay
| Year | Nominee | Country/ territory | Film | Status | Notes | Ref(s) |
| 1983 (55th) | Gregory Nava | Mexico | El Norte | Nominated | Born in California to a father of Mexican descent. First American of Hispanic descent to be nominated for Best Screenplay. Shared with Anna Thomas. | |
| 2014 (87th) | Alexander Dinelaris Jr. | Puerto Rico; Cuba | Birdman | Won | Born in New York to a mother of Puerto Rican and Cuban descent. First American of Hispanic descent to win for Best Screenplay. Shared with Alejandro González Iñárritu, Nicolás Giacobone, and Armando Bó. | |
| 2020 (93rd) | Shaka King | Panama | Judas and the Black Messiah | Nominated | Born in New York to a Panamanian father and a mother of Panamanian descent. Shared with Will Berson, Kenny Lucas, and Keith Lucas. | |

== By decade ==
=== All categories ===
| Decade | 1930s | 1940s | 1950s | 1960s | 1970s | 1980s | 1990s | 2000s | 2010s | 2020s | Total |
|---|---|---|---|---|---|---|---|---|---|---|---|
| Wins | - | - | - | - | - | 2 | 2 | 3 | 4 | 4 | 14 |
| Nominations | - | 1 | 1 | - | 6 | 4 | 1 | - | 1 | 13 | 27 |
| Total nominations | - | 1 | 1 | - | 6 | 6 | 3 | 3 | 5 | 17 | 41 |

Note: Each win and nomination in a category in a given year counts only once, regardless of whether a win or a nomination was shared among multiple Latin Americans.

=== Acting nominations ===
| Decade | 1940s | 1950s | 1960s | 1980s | 1990s | 2000s | 2010s | 2020s | Total |
|---|---|---|---|---|---|---|---|---|---|
| Actor | - | - | - | 1 | - | - | - | 2 | 3 |
| Actress | - | - | - | - | 1 | 1 | - | 1 | 3 |
| Supp. Actor | 1 | - | - | - | - | - | - | - | 1 |
| Supp. Actress | - | 1 | - | - | 2 | - | - | 4 | 5 |
| Total | 1 | 1 | - | 1 | 3 | 1 | - | 7 | 11 |

== By country ==
| Rank | Country | No. of wins | No. of nominations |
|---|---|---|---|
| 1 | Mexico | 6 | 21 |
| 2 | Puerto Rico | 5 | 8 |
| 3 | Cuba | 5 | 6 |
| 4 | Dominican Republic | 2 | 2 |
| 5 | Spain | 1 | 2 |
| 6 | Guatemala | 0 | 2 |
| 6 | Panama | 0 | 2 |
| 7 | Colombia | 0 | 1 |
| 7 | Honduras | 0 | 1 |
| 7 | Nicaragua | 0 | 1 |
| 8 | Argentina | 0 | 0 |
| 8 | Bolivia | 0 | 0 |
| 8 | Chile | 0 | 0 |
| 8 | Costa Rica | 0 | 0 |
| 8 | Ecuador | 0 | 0 |
| 8 | El Salvador | 0 | 0 |
| 8 | Paraguay | 0 | 0 |
| 8 | Peru | 0 | 0 |
| 8 | Uruguay | 0 | 0 |
| 8 | Venezuela | 0 | 0 |

Note: This list only includes individuals of Hispanic descent born outside Latin America, including the United States. See List of Latin American Academy Award winners and nominees for individuals born in Latin America who have either been nominated for or won an Academy Award.

== See also ==
- List of Latin American Academy Award winners and nominees
- Lists of Latin American Academy Award winners and nominees by country
