= Eaux profondes =

1981 film

- Film poster
- Directed by: Michel Deville
- Screenplay by: Michel Deville; Florence Delay
- Based on: Deep Water by Patricia Highsmith
- Produced by: Denis Mermet
- Starring: Isabelle Huppert; Jean-Louis Trintignant
- Cinematography: Claude Lecomte
- Edited by: Raymonde Guyot
- Music by: Manuel de Falla
- Distributed by: Gaumont Distribution
- Release date: 16 December 1981
- Running time: 94 minutes
- Country: France
- Language: French

Eaux profondes is a 1981 French thriller film directed by Michel Deville that stars Isabelle Huppert and Jean-Louis Trintignant. Based on the novel Deep Water by Patricia Highsmith, it tells the story of a man who regains his wife's affections by killing two of her lovers.

== Plot ==
On the island of Jersey, the perfumier Vic and his wife Mélanie are an ideal couple. Living in a grand house, they entertain often and mix with all the important people. Mélanie has however taken to provoking Vic at parties by flirting outrageously with other men, so Vic warns them off by saying that he was the murderer of a missing man.

Mélanie then starts bringing random men home to drink and dance with her, until Vic eventually goes to bed alone in disgust. When she picks up Carlo, a hotel employee, and takes him to an exclusive party, Vic has had enough. After everybody has had a dip in the swimming pool, just Carlo is left and Vic drowns him. The verdict of the inquest is accidental death, though Mélanie claims at the hearing that it was murder by Vic. When soon after she brings home yet another lover, this time Vic researches the man, finding that he is a private investigator hired by Mélanie to keep an eye on him. When the man's cover is blown, he leaves fast.

Vic then receives a visitor, a man named Cameron who sells perfumes in the USA, and Mélanie makes an immediate play for him. After she tells Vic one morning that she is leaving with Cameron, driving into town he sees the man and asks him into the car to discuss things. Going to an isolated spot, after bludgeoning Cameron to death and wrapping and trussing the body, he tips it off a high cliff into the sea. Investigating the unexplained disappearance of a man who had not paid his hotel bill, the police question Vic as the last person to see him and then close the file for lack of evidence. Mélanie now realises that he has killed two men to get closer to her and starts a reconciliation.

== Cast ==
- Isabelle Huppert as Mélanie
- Jean-Louis Trintignant as Vic
- Sandrine Kljajic as their daughter Marion
- Éric Frey as Denis Miller
- Christian Benedetti as Carlo Canelli
- Bruce Myers as Cameron
- Bertrand Bonvoisin as Robert Carpentier
- Jean-Luc Moreau as Joël
- Robin Renucci as Ralph
- Philippe Clévenot as Henri Valette
- Martine Costes as La maman de Julie
- Évelyne Didi as Evelyn Cowan
- Jean-Michel Dupuis as Philip Cowan
- Bernard Freyd as Havermal
- Anne Head as La directrice
- Maurice Jacquemont as Docteur Franklin
- Sylvie Orcier as Jeanne Miller
- Pierre Vial as Le juge

== See also ==
- Deep Water (2022)
- List of Isabelle Huppert performances
