= Cat dancer =

Cat dancer may refer to:

- "Omaha" the Cat Dancer, an erotic comic strip
- Cat Dancer, a 1984 album by Sandy Stewart
- Cat Dancers, a 2007 HBO documentary
