= Ana de Armas =

Cuban-Spanish-American actress (born 1988)

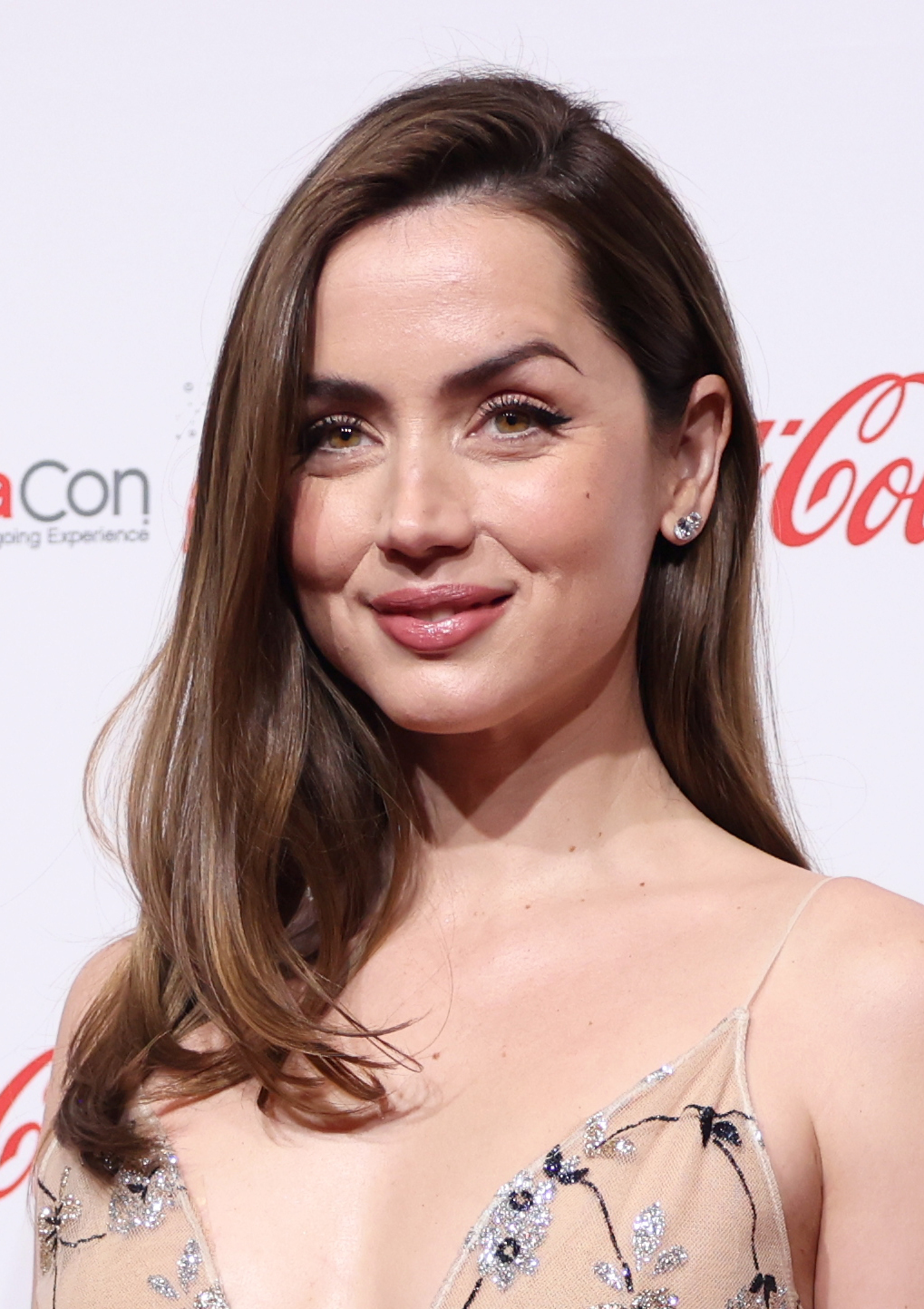
- De Armas in 2025
- Born: Ana Celia de Armas Caso; 30 April 1988 (age 38); Havana, Cuba
- Citizenship: Cuba; Spain; United States
- Occupation: Actress
- Years active: 2006–present
- Spouse: Marc Clotet (m. 2011; div. 2013)
- Partner(s): Alberto "Beto" Montenegro (2026–present)

Ana Celia de Armas Caso (/də ˈɑːrməs/ də AR-məs, Latin American Spanish: [ˈana ˈselja ðe ˈaɾmas ˈkaso]; born 30 April 1988) is a Cuban-Spanish-American actress. She has been nominated for several accolades, including an Academy Award, an Actor Award, a BAFTA, and two Golden Globes.

She began her career in Cuba with a leading role in the romantic drama Virgin Rose (2006). At the age of 18, she moved to Madrid, Spain, and starred in the mystery drama thriller television series El Internado (2007–2010). After moving to Los Angeles, de Armas had English-speaking roles in the thriller film Knock Knock (2015) and the black comedy crime film War Dogs (2016).

De Armas rose to prominence for her roles as the holographic AI Joi in the science fiction film Blade Runner 2049 (2017) and nurse Marta Cabrera in the mystery film Knives Out (2019), receiving a nomination for the Golden Globe Award for Best Actress in a Motion Picture – Musical or Comedy. She then played Bond girl Paloma in No Time to Die (2021) and actress Marilyn Monroe in the psychological drama film Blonde (2022), for which she became the first Cuban nominated for the Academy Award for Best Actress. She then led the action thriller Ballerina (2025), a spin-off installment in the John Wick franchise.

== Early life ==
Ana Celia de Armas Caso was born on 30 April 1988 in Havana, La Habana Province, Cuba, and raised in Santa Cruz del Norte. Her father Ramón de Armas held a range of positions throughout his career, including bank manager, teacher, school principal, and deputy mayor. He had previously studied philosophy at a Soviet Union university. Her mother Ana Caso served in the human resources department of the Ministry of Education. De Armas' maternal grandparents were Spanish immigrants to Cuba from Valverde de la Sierra in León and Guardo in Palencia, both in northern Spain. De Armas has one older brother, Francisco Javier de Armas Caso, an American–based photographer who, in 2020, was questioned by Cuban police due to his critical stance on Decree 349 and his links to artists under government surveillance. Although de Armas grew up amid food rationing, fuel shortages, and electricity blackouts during Cuba's Special Period, she has described her early years as happy.

During her childhood and adolescence, de Armas had limited knowledge of popular culture beyond Cuba. She was allowed to watch "20 minutes of cartoons on Saturday and the Sunday movie matinee." Her family did not own a VCR, and she watched Hollywood movies in her neighbor's apartment. She memorized and practiced monologues in front of a mirror, and decided to become an actress when she was 12. In 2002, aged 14, she successfully auditioned to join Havana's National Theatre of Cuba. She sometimes hitchhiked to attend the "rigorous" course. While a student, she filmed three movies. She left the four-year drama course shortly before presenting her final thesis because Cuban graduates are forbidden from leaving the country without first completing three years of mandatory service to the community. At age 18, with Spanish citizenship through her maternal grandparents, she moved to Madrid to pursue an acting career.

== Career ==
=== Career beginnings in Spanish cinema (2006–2013) ===
In her native Cuba, de Armas had a starring role opposite Álex González in Manuel Gutiérrez Aragón's romantic drama Una rosa de Francia (2006). Cuban actor Jorge Perugorría suggested that the director consider de Armas for the role, after meeting her while attending a birthday party with his daughters. The director visited de Armas's drama school and interrupted the sixteen-year-old during her audition to inform her that the role was hers. She travelled to Spain as part of a promotional tour for the film and was introduced to Juan Lanja, who would later become her Spanish agent. She then starred in the movie El edén perdido (2007) and had a supporting role in Fernando Pérez's Madrigal (2007), filmed at night without the permission of her drama school tutors.

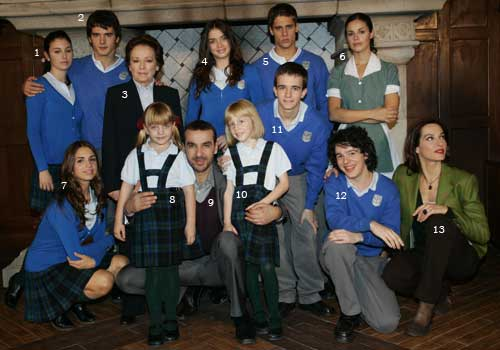
De Armas (standing at the center with number 4) with the cast of El Internado: Laguna Negra (The Boarding School) in 2008

At age 18, de Armas moved to Madrid. Within two weeks of arriving, she met with casting director Luis San Narciso, who had seen her in Una rosa de Francia. Two months later, he cast her as Carolina in the drama El Internado, in which she starred for six seasons from 2007 to 2010. The television show, set in a boarding school, became popular with viewers and made de Armas a celebrity figure in Spain. In a break from filming, she starred in the successful coming-of-age comedy Mentiras y Gordas (Sex, Party and Lies) (2009). Despite the popularity of El Internado, de Armas felt typecast and was mainly offered roles as youngsters. She asked to be written out of the show in its second to last season.

After spending a few months living in New York City to learn English, de Armas was persuaded to return to Spain to star in seventeen episodes of the historical drama Hispania (2010–2011). She then starred in Antonio Trashorras's horror films El callejón (2011) and Anabel (2015), and in the drama Por un puñado de besos (2014). During a long period without acting work, de Armas participated in workshops at Tomaz Pandur's Madrid theatre company and felt "very anxious" about the lack of momentum in her career.

=== Transition to Hollywood and breakthrough (2014–2019) ===
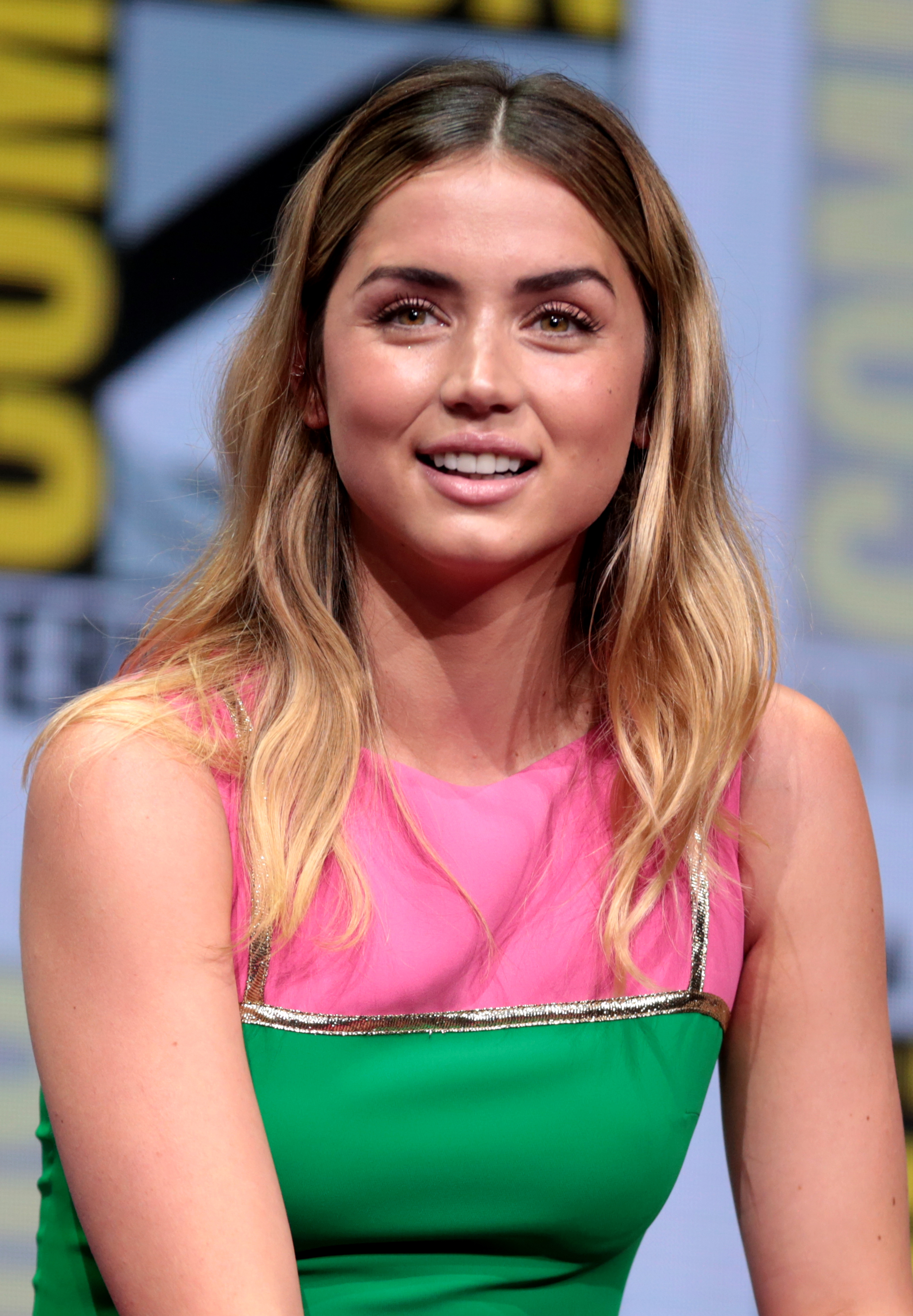
De Armas at San Diego Comic-Con in 2017

With encouragement from her newly hired Hollywood agent, she decided to move to Los Angeles. When de Armas first arrived in Los Angeles in 2014, she had to start her career again "from scratch." She spoke very little English and, during early auditions, she often "didn't even know what [she] was saying." She spent four months in full-time education to learn English, not wanting to be confined to playing characters written specifically for Latina actresses. She starred opposite Keanu Reeves in her first Hollywood release—Eli Roth's erotic thriller Knock Knock (2015)—and learned her lines phonetically. Despite giving a positive review of the film, Randy Cordova of the Arizona Republic found de Armas to be "unconvincing" in her role. Reeves then telephoned de Armas to invite her to star in a Spanish-language role in the thriller Daughter of God which he acted in and produced. Producer Mark Downie hoped the film would be a star vehicle for de Armas, but due to executive meddling, Daughter of God was severely edited with de Armas' former starring role reduced. The film was ultimately released as Exposed in 2016. Frank Scheck of The Hollywood Reporter stated that while she was "appealing" in her part, de Armas was unable to demonstrate her "character's intense emotional demands."

De Armas had a supporting role in Todd Phillips's War Dogs (2016), acting opposite Miles Teller as the wife of an arms dealer, and again learned her lines phonetically. David Ehrlich of IndieWire found her to be "memorable in a thankless role". She starred opposite Édgar Ramírez in the biopic Hands of Stone (2016) as the wife of Panamanian boxer Roberto Durán. Despite its delayed release, Hands of Stone was the first Hollywood film de Armas had filmed. While still living in Madrid, she was contacted by director Jonathan Jakubowicz, who had watched her in El Internado, who asked her to travel to Los Angeles to audition for the Spanish-language part. In reviewing the film, Christy Lemire of RogerEbert.com described de Armas as "a hugely charismatic presence. But except for a couple of showy moments, she gets little to do besides function as the dutiful wife."

In Denis Villeneuve's futuristic thriller Blade Runner 2049 (2017), de Armas had a supporting role as Joi, the holographic AI girlfriend of Ryan Gosling's character, a blade runner. Mark Kermode of The Guardian said she "brings three-dimensional warmth to a character who is essentially a digital projection." Anthony Lane of The New Yorker found her to be "wondrous": "Whenever Joi appears, the movie's imaginative heart begins to race." While the performance was initially discussed as a breakthrough role, the film underperformed commercially, and de Armas spent much of the following year in her native Cuba, where she purchased a house. For her performance, she earned a nomination for the Saturn Award for Best Supporting Actress. Also in 2017, she had a supporting role in the action thriller Overdrive as the love interest to Scott Eastwood's character. Stephen Dalton of The Hollywood Reporter wrote that she "radiates more kick-ass charisma than her thankless sidekick role might suggest."

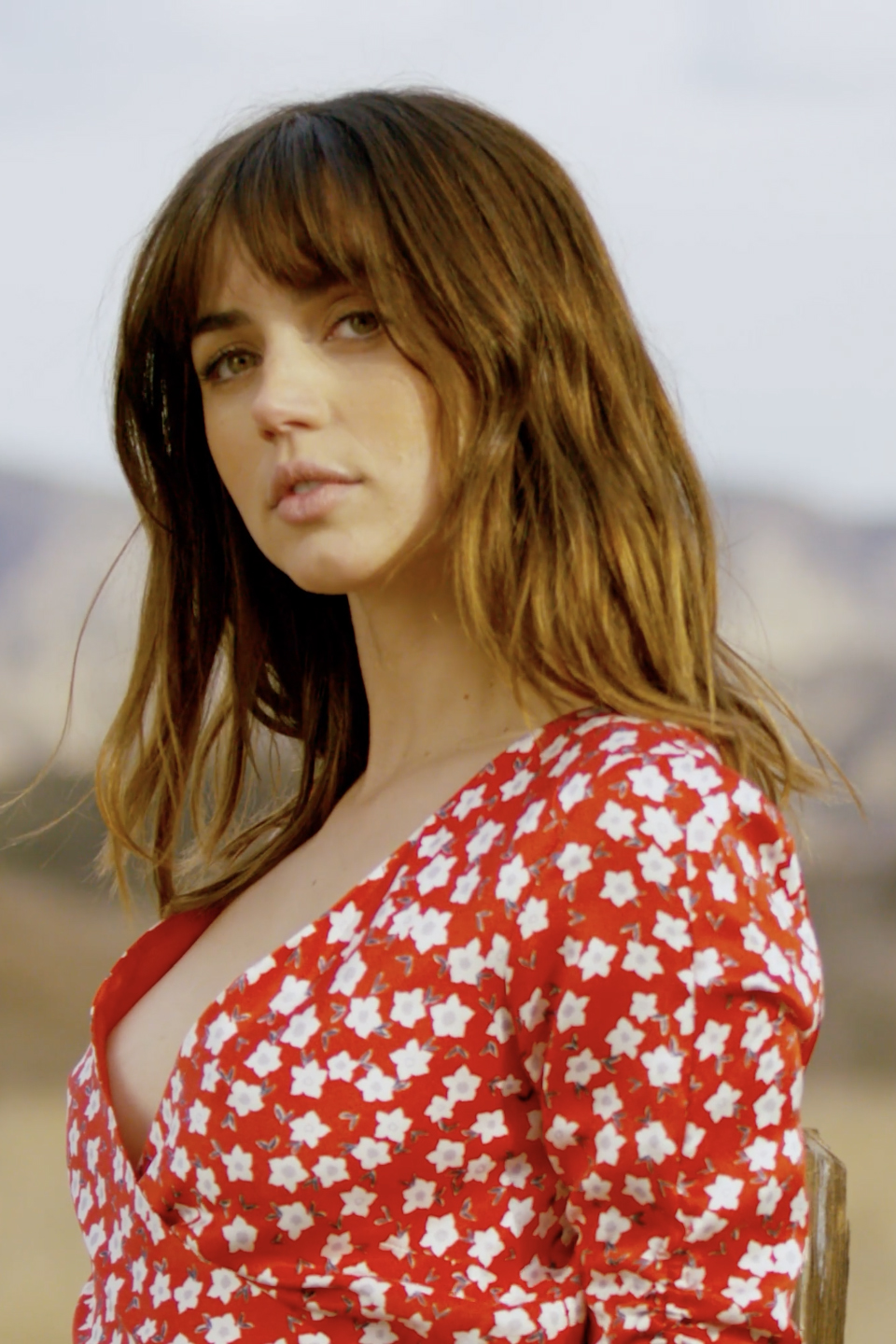
De Armas in 2018

In 2018, de Armas starred opposite Demián Bichir in John Hillcoat's medical drama Corazón. She played a Dominican woman with congestive heart failure in the short film, funded by Montefiore Medical Center to raise awareness of organ donation. While de Armas's scenes opposite Himesh Patel in the 2019 romantic comedy Yesterday were included in the film's trailer, they were cut from the final product. The director Danny Boyle said that, while de Armas was "really radiant" in her scenes, the introduction of a love triangle subplot did not test well with audiences.

De Armas' role as an immigrant nurse in the ensemble murder mystery film Knives Out (2019), written and directed by Rian Johnson, was widely praised and marked a breakthrough for the actress. When first approached about the project, she was unenthusiastic about the idea of playing a stereotypical "Latina caregiver" but soon realized that her character was "so much more than that." Tom Shone of The Times remarked, "The film's standout performance comes from its least well-known member, the Cuban de Armas, who manages the difficult task of making goodness interesting." Benjamin Lee of The Guardian said her "striking" performance left a "lasting impression." The film was a major box office success. De Armas was nominated for the Golden Globe Award for Best Actress – Motion Picture Comedy or Musical with her also winning the Saturn Award for Best Supporting Actress and the National Board of Review Award for Best Cast with the cast.

=== Leading roles and mainstream recognition (2020–present) ===
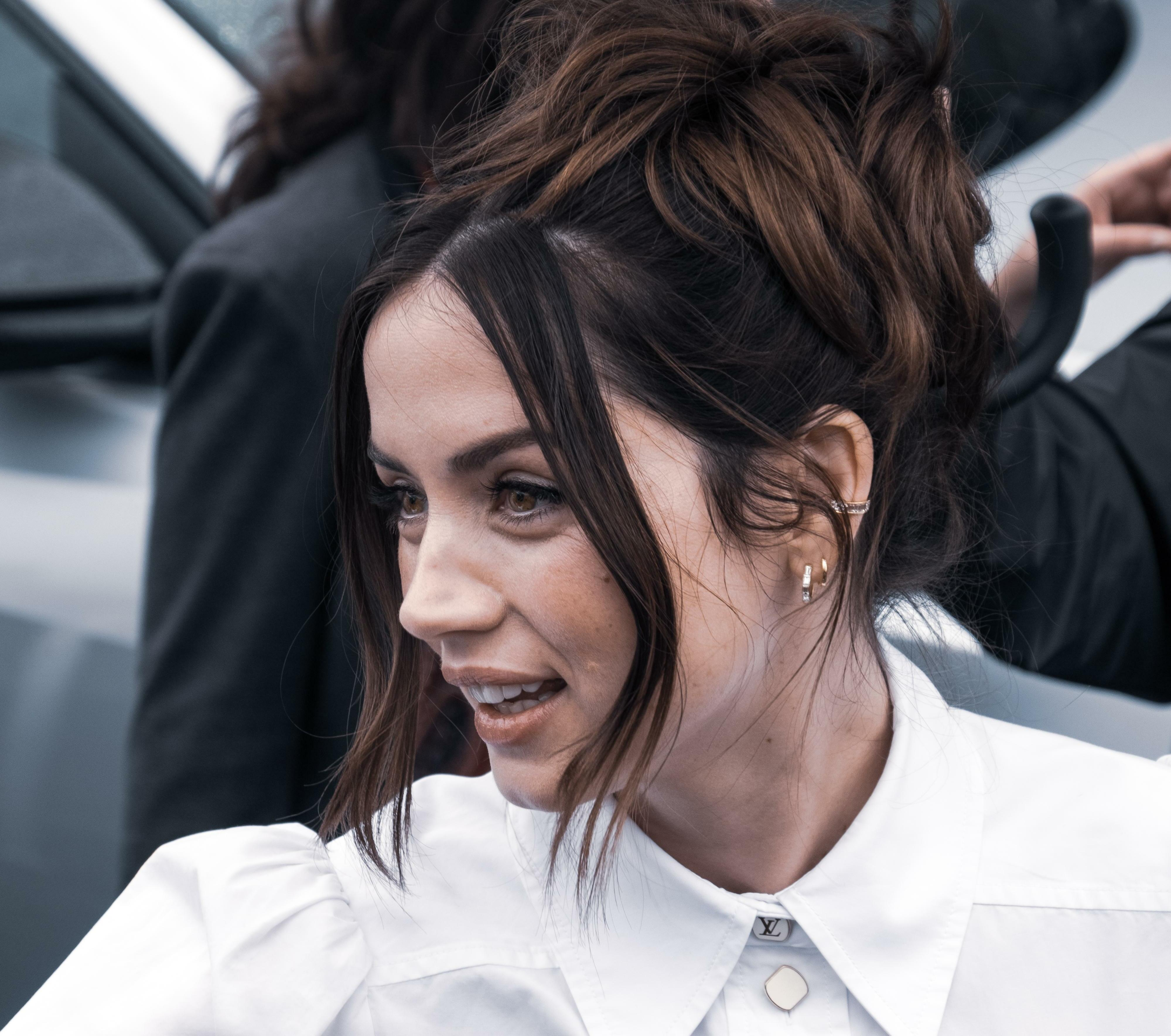
De Armas at the San Sebastián International Film Festival in 2022

De Armas starred in four films released in the United States in 2020. She had a supporting role in the crime thriller The Informer as the wife of Joel Kinnaman's character. Guy Lodge of Variety found "her thin role all the more glaring in the wake of her Knives Out stardom." She appeared as a femme fatale in the noir crime drama The Night Clerk. Brian Tallerico of RogerEbert.com said the film had "no idea" what to do with her "blinding charisma" while Katie Rife of The AV Club remarked that it would be remembered, "if at all, as a movie de Armas was way too good for." She starred opposite Wagner Moura in the Netflix biopic Sergio (2020) as Carolina Larriera, a U.N. official and the partner of diplomat Sérgio Vieira de Mello. John DeFore of The Hollywood Reporter found her "magnetic" while Jessica Kiang of Variety said she imbued the part "with an intelligence and will that makes her more than just de Mello's romantic foil." De Armas reunited with Moura to play the wife of one of the Cuban Five in Olivier Assayas's Netflix spy thriller Wasp Network. The film was shot on location in Cuba; it was de Armas's first work in her home country since leaving as a teenager. Glenn Kenny of The New York Times found her "superb" while Jay Weissberg of Variety described her as "a joyous, bewitching presence whose career seems destined for the big time."

In 2021, de Armas reunited with Daniel Craig to play a Bond girl in Cary Joji Fukunaga's No Time to Die. Fukunaga wrote the character of a Cuban CIA agent with de Armas in mind. She described the character as bubbly and "very irresponsible". In her short appearance in No Time to Die, her character, Paloma, claims to have little training, but proves to be highly skilled while fighting. No Time to Die was a commercial success, grossing $774.2 million worldwide, and earned positive reviews. Peter Bradshaw of The Guardian praised de Armas' "witty and unworldly turn". De Armas starred in Adrian Lyne's erotic thriller Deep Water, based upon the novel by Patricia Highsmith. She and Ben Affleck play a couple in an open marriage. In 2022, de Armas starred in the Russo brothers' Netflix action thriller The Gray Man. Neither Deep Water nor The Gray Man were particularly successful with critics and audiences.

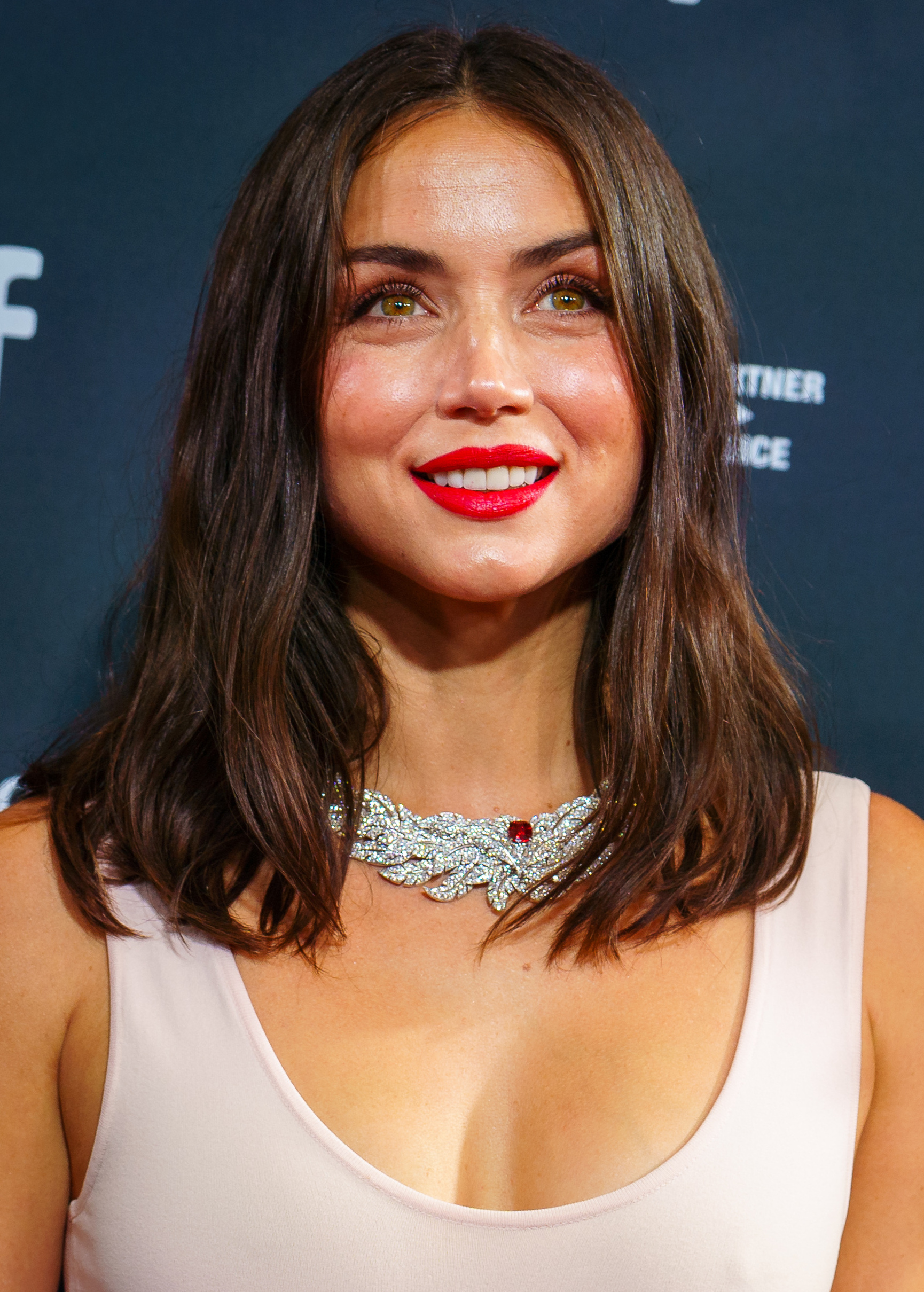
De Armas at the Toronto International Film Festival in 2024

De Armas portrayed Marilyn Monroe (as Norma Jean) in the Netflix biopic Blonde (2022), based on the biographical fiction novel of the same name by Joyce Carol Oates. Director Andrew Dominik noticed de Armas's performance in Knock Knock and, while she went through a long casting process, Dominik secured the role for her after the first audition. In preparation, de Armas worked with a dialect coach for about nine months, read Oates' novel and also said she studied hundreds of photographs, videos, audio recordings, and films to prepare for the role. Despite criticism towards her casting, due to her having a notable Spanish accent, de Armas' performance was praised; Catherine Bray of Empire labeled de Armas' performance as "powerful", while Richard Lawson of Vanity Fair remarked that "De Armas is fiercely, almost scarily committed to the role, maintaining high and focused energy through every torrent of tears and screams and traumas." She received a nomination for the Academy Award for Best Actress, in addition to nominations for the BAFTA, Golden Globe and SAG Award in the same category. She became the first Cuban to be nominated for the first of these.

De Armas next starred with Chris Evans in the Apple TV+ action comedy film Ghosted (2023). Benjamin Lee of The Guardian panned the film and the lack of chemistry between de Armas and Evans. She appeared alongside an ensemble cast in Ron Howard's survival thriller Eden (2024). She then starred in the John Wick spin-off action thriller Ballerina (2025), in which she portrayed a vengeful assassin.

== Personal life ==
De Armas holds Cuban, Spanish, and American citizenship. She moved to Los Angeles at 26, and resides in Vermont as of 2023.

De Armas began a relationship with Spanish actor Marc Clotet in mid-2010. They married on the Costa Brava in July 2011. They divorced in early 2013. After meeting on the set of erotic psychological thriller film Deep Water in late 2019, de Armas dated American actor Ben Affleck from March 2020 to January 2021. De Armas received significant criticism, particularly among members of the Cuban diaspora, after being photographed kissing Manuel Anido Cuesta, the stepson of the president of Cuba Miguel Díaz-Canel in November 2024.

De Armas was raised Catholic. It was reported in July 2025 that she was dating American actor Tom Cruise after she was spotted attending an Oasis concert with him. It has since been reported that the couple separated in October 2025.

== Filmography ==
=== Film ===
Year	Title	Role	Notes
2006	Virgin Rose	Marie	
2007	Madrigal	Stella Maris	
2009	Sex, Party and Lies	Carola	
2009	Y de postre, qué	Girl	Short film
2009	Ánima	Julieta	Short film
2011	Blind Alley	Rosa / Laura	
2012	Perrito chino	Sabina	Short film
2013	Faraday	Inma Murga	
2014	Por un puñado de besos	Sol	
2015	Knock Knock	Bel	English-language debut
2015	Anabel	Cris	
2016	Exposed	Isabel de la Cruz	
2016	Hands of Stone	Felicidad Iglesias	
2016	War Dogs	Iz	
2017	Overdrive	Stephanie	
2017	Blade Runner 2049	Joi	
2018	Corazón	Elena Ramirez	Short film
2019	The Informer	Sofia Koslow	
2019	Wasp Network	Ana Margarita Martinez	
2019	Knives Out	Marta Cabrera	
2020	Sergio	Carolina Larriera	
2020	The Night Clerk	Andrea Rivera	
2021	No Time to Die	Paloma	
2022	Deep Water	Melinda Van Allen	
2022	The Gray Man	Dani Miranda	
2022	Blonde	Norma Jeane	
2023	Ghosted	Sadie Rhodes	Also executive producer
2024	Eden	The Baroness	
2025	Ballerina	Eve Macarro	

=== Television ===
Year	Title	Role	Notes
2007	El edén perdido	Gloria	Television film
2007–2010	El Internado	Carolina Leal Solís	56 episodes
2010–2011	Hispania, la leyenda	Nerea	17 episodes
2023	Saturday Night Live	Herself (host)	Episode: "Ana de Armas/Karol G"

=== Music videos ===
Year	Title	Role	Artist
2009	"Mundo frágil"	Niña	Sidecars
2018	"Everyday"	Chica	Orishas
2020	"Antes Que El Mundo Se Acabe"	Herself	Residente

=== Video games ===
Year	Title	Role	Notes
2025	Call of Duty: Black Ops 6	Eve Macarro	Playable character in Multiplayer modes; part of Ballerina collaboration

== Awards and nominations ==
Year	Organization	Category	Work	Result	Ref.
2018	Saturn Awards	Best Supporting Actress	Blade Runner 2049	Nominated	
2019	Detroit Film Critics Society	Best Breakthrough	Knives Out	Nominated	
2019	National Board of Review	Best Cast	Knives Out	Won	
2019	Golden Schmoes Awards	Breakthrough Performance of the Year	Knives Out	Won	
2019	IGN Summer Movie Awards	Best Lead Performer in a Movie	Knives Out	Nominated	
2019	Satellite Awards	Best Cast – Motion Picture	Knives Out	Won	
2019	Satellite Awards	Best Actress – Motion Picture Comedy or Musical	Knives Out	Nominated	
2020	Golden Globe Awards	Best Actress – Motion Picture Comedy or Musical	Knives Out	Nominated	
2020	Critics' Choice Movie Awards	Best Acting Ensemble	Knives Out	Nominated	
2020	Gold Derby Awards	Best Ensemble	Knives Out	Nominated	
2020	Gold Derby Awards	Best Breakthrough Performer	Knives Out	Nominated	
2020	Actors and Actresses Union Awards	Best Actress in an International Production	Knives Out	Won	
2020	Imagen Awards	Best Actress – Feature Film	Knives Out	Nominated	
2021	Saturn Awards	Best Supporting Actress	Knives Out	Won	
2022	Actors and Actresses Union Awards	Best Actress in an International Production	No Time to Die	Won	
2022	Critics' Choice Super Awards	Best Actress in an Action Movie	No Time to Die	Nominated	
2022	Deauville American Film Festival	Hollywood Rising Star Award	—	Won	
2022	Chicago Film Critics Association	Best Actress	Blonde	Nominated	
2023	Capri Hollywood International Film Festival	Best Actress	Blonde	Won	
2023	EDA Awards	She Deserves a New Agent Award	Blonde	Won	
2023	EDA Awards	Most Egregious Lovers' Age Difference Award	Deep Water	Nominated	
2023	Golden Globe Awards	Best Actress in a Motion Picture – Drama	Blonde	Nominated	
2023	London Film Critics' Circle Awards	Actress of the Year	Blonde	Nominated	
2023	AACTA International Awards	Best Actress	Blonde	Nominated	
2023	Screen Actors Guild Awards	Outstanding Performance by a Female Actor in a Leading Role	Blonde	Nominated	
2023	British Academy Film Awards	Best Actress in a Leading Role	Blonde	Nominated	
2023	Academy Awards	Best Actress	Blonde	Nominated	
2023	Actors and Actresses Union Awards	Best Actress in an International Production	Blonde	Won	
2024	Razzie Awards	Worst Actress	Ghosted	Nominated	
2024	Razzie Awards	Worst Screen Combo (shared with Chris Evans)	Ghosted	Nominated	

== See also ==
- List of actors with Academy Award nominations
- List of Academy Award winners and nominees from Cuba
- List of Latin American Academy Award winners and nominees
- List of Academy Award winners and nominees from Spain
