= Virgin Rose =

- Spanish: Una rosa de Francia
- Directed by: Manuel Gutiérrez Aragón
- Written by: Manuel Gutiérrez Aragón; Senel Paz
- Produced by: Gerardo Herrero; Javier López Blanco
- Starring: Jorge Perugorría; Álex González; Broselianda Hernández; Ana Celia de Armas
- Cinematography: Alfredo Mayo
- Edited by: José Salcedo
- Music by: Xavier Capellas
- Production companies: Tornasol Films; ICAIC
- Distributed by: Alta Classics (es)
- Release date: 3 February 2006 (Spain)
- Running time: 100 minutes
- Countries: Spain; Cuba
- Language: Spanish

Virgin Rose (Spanish: Una rosa de Francia) is a 2006 Spanish–Cuban romance and adventure film directed by Manuel Gutiérrez Aragón which stars Jorge Perugorría, Álex González, Broselianda Hernández and Ana de Armas, in her film debut.

== Plot ==
It is primarily set in 1950s Havana. Andrés is a young and idealistic man working for a boat skipper, Simón, involved in human trafficking. He becomes infatuated with Marie, one of the underage girls recruited by Simón who are educated in Madame's house for the purpose of marrying old and wealthy men.

== Cast ==
- Jorge Perugorría as Simón.
- Broselianda Hernández as Madame.
- Álex González as Andrés.
- Ana Celia de Armas as Marie.

== Production ==
A joint Spain–Cuba co-production, Virgin Rose was produced by Tornasol and the Instituto Cubano del Arte e Industria Cinematográficos (ICAIC). The film was shot in Cuba in 2005. It was written by Gutiérrez Aragón alongside Senel Paz. Gerardo Herrero and Javier López Blanco took over production duties. The score was authored by Xavier Capellas. Alfredo Mayo took over cinematography duties.

== Release ==
Distributed by Alta Classics, the film was theatrically released in Spain on 3 February 2006.

== Reception ==
=== Critical response ===
Jonathan Holland of Variety considered that the film "aims at a timelessness that sometimes looks behind the times".

== See also ==
- List of Spanish films of 2006
