= Deep Water (Highsmith novel) =

1957 psychological thriller novel by Patricia Highsmith

- First edition cover
- Author: Patricia Highsmith
- Cover artist: Polly Cameron
- Language: English
- Genre: Psychological thriller, mystery
- Publisher: Harper & Brothers
- Publication date: 1957
- Publication place: United States
- Media type: Hardcover
- Pages: 272
- ISBN: 978-0-393-32455-6

Deep Water is a psychological thriller by Patricia Highsmith first published in 1957 by Harper & Brothers. It is Highsmith's fifth published novel. The working title was originally The Dog in the Manger. It was brought back into print in the United States in 2003 by W. W. Norton & Company.

== Plot ==
Victor and Melinda Van Allen live in a loveless marriage in the small town of Little Wesley. In order to accommodate Melinda while avoiding divorce, theirs has become an open marriage within which Melinda is permitted to stray as long as she does not desert her family. Vic becomes fascinated with the unsolved murder of one of Melinda's former lovers, Malcolm McRae, and takes credit for it in order to successfully drive away her current fling. When the real murderer is apprehended, the community interprets Vic's false claim as a dark joke.

Melinda begins a new relationship with a local pianist, Charley De Lisle. One night, at a party held in the home of their neighbors, the Cowans, Vic and Charley find themselves alone in the backyard swimming pool. Impulsively, Vic drowns Charley, leaves the pool, and feigns surprise when Charley's body is discovered. His death is attributed to a cramp, although Melinda is immediately suspicious of her husband.

The townsfolk begin to move on from the event, although some, particularly Don Wilson, a local pulp writer, begin to suspect Vic of foul play. Melinda demands Vic admit his guilt and accuses him in front of their friends, but Vic is undaunted, finding a sense of superiority in having gotten away with the crime. A newcomer to Little Wesley, Harold Carpenter, claims to be a psychiatrist at the local asylum. Vic deduces that he is really a private detective hired by Don and Melinda. Vic confronts him, and Carpenter leaves town, unable to incriminate Vic.

Melinda takes up with another lover, a surveyor from New York named Tony Cameron. Vic privately offers Melinda a divorce and she finally accepts, saying that Tony has offered to take her to his next assignment in Mexico. After a night in which Tony rudely insinuates himself into their home and embarrassing him in front of an author whose book Vic's small press is publishing, Vic runs into Tony in town and offers him a lift. Vic drives Tony to a quarry where he kills him and disposes of his body in the reservoir.

An investigation is opened into Tony's sudden disappearance. Many of the neighbors refuse to cooperate due to Vic's good standing, Melinda's antisocial behavior, and the police's theory that Tony and Melinda were planning to run away together. Vic escapes apprehension once more and, to his surprise and suspicion, finds Melinda more courteous, even loving, toward him, as though she wishes for them to start over again. When she attempts to use this new openness to draw Vic into confessing to the murders of Charley and Tony, Vic is sure it is a last-ditch ruse concocted by Melinda and Don.

Melinda finally implements a plan to bring Vic and Don to the quarry at the same time, where Don sees Vic looking at bloodstains left during the murder and looking into the reservoir to ensure Tony's body has not resurfaced. Vic knows, as the two of them leave, that Don will go directly to the police. Vic returns home, and in a sudden rage, strangles Melinda to death. At that moment, Don arrives with a policeman and Vic is led away.

== Reception ==
Anthony Boucher, reviewing the novel in The New York Times, praised Highsmith's "coming of age as a novelist", and noted that Deep Water was "incomparably stronger in subtlety and depth of characterization" than her first novel, Strangers on a Train.

Author Gillian Flynn named the novel one of her favorites. In an interview with The Wall Street Journal, Flynn stated:

About ten or fifteen years ago, I came across it in a used-book store. I remember thinking, "Why has no one told me about it?" People know her for Ripley or Strangers on a Train but don't know a lot of her other stuff. And, it being a marital thriller where all the phobias and fears and darkness are based mostly inside a couple's home, that has always interested me, that in-your-face warfare between a husband and wife.

== Film adaptation ==
- The novel was adapted in 1981 by director Michel Deville for the film Eaux profondes, set in France. Jean-Louis Trintignant starred as Vic, with Isabelle Huppert as Melinda, renamed Melanie.
- In 1983 the novel was adapted a second time for the television film (in 2 parts) Tiefe Wasser, set in Germany. Peter Bongartz starred Vic van Allen, with Constanze Engelbrecht as Melinda.
- Adrian Lyne directed a film adaptation, released in 2022, starring Ben Affleck and Ana de Armas for 20th Century Studios based on a script by Zach Helm and Sam Levinson.
