= List of Academy Award winners and nominees from Colombia =

This is a list of Colombian Academy Award winners and nominees. This list details the performances of Colombian filmmakers, actors, actresses and films that have either been nominated for or have won an Academy Award.

== Best Actress in a Leading Role ==
This list focuses on Colombian-born actors and actresses.

Best Actress
Year	Name	Film	Status	Milestones / Notes
2004	Catalina Sandino Moreno	Maria Full of Grace	Nominated	First Colombian to be nominated for an Academy Award. First actress to be nominated for a Spanish-speaking role.

== Best International Feature Film ==
This list focuses on Colombian films that won or were nominated for the Best International Feature Film award.

Best International Feature Film
Year	Film	Director	Status	Milestones / Notes
2015	Embrace of the Serpent (El abrazo de la serpiente)	Ciro Guerra	Nominated	First Colombian film to be nominated for an Academy Award.

== Best Documentary Short Film ==
Best Documentary Short Film
Year	Name	Film	Status	Milestones / Notes
2007	Isabel Vega	La Corona	Nominated	Nomination shared with Amanda Micheli.
2025	Juan Arredondo	Armed Only with a Camera: The Life and Death of Brent Renaud	Nominated	Nomination shared with Craig Renaud.

== See also ==
- Cinema of Colombia
- List of Colombian films
