= Cat Dancers =

- Directed by: Harris Fishman
- Cinematography: Amanda Micheli
- Edited by: Alexis Spraic
- Release dates: June 2007 (LA Film Festival); December 15, 2008
- Running time: 75 minutes
- Country: United States

Cat Dancers is a 2007 HBO documentary film about Ron Holiday (his stage name; real name Ron Guay) and his wife Joy Holiday (her stage name; married name Doris Guay; birth name Doris Gagnon) and their jaguar, panther and tiger show. It is directed by Harris Fishman.

The 75-minute documentary charts how Ron Holiday, Joy Holiday and Chuck Lizza, aka the "Cat Dancers", became one of the world's first exotic tiger entertainment acts. For years the trio shared a happy if unorthodox life as performers and lovers until a pair of bizarre cat-related deaths brought their story to a tragic end. The film premiered at the 2007 LA Film Festival.
