= Deep Water (2022 film) =

2022 film by Adrian Lyne

- Official release poster
- Directed by: Adrian Lyne
- Screenplay by: Zach Helm; Sam Levinson
- Based on: Deep Water by Patricia Highsmith
- Produced by: Arnon Milchan; Guymon Casady; Benjamin Forkner; Anthony Katagas
- Starring: Ben Affleck; Ana de Armas
- Cinematography: Eigil Bryld
- Edited by: Tim Squyres; Andrew Mondshein
- Music by: Marco Beltrami
- Production companies: 20th Century Studios (Note: This film was originally in-production at 20th Century Studios, but the studio went uncredited upon release of the film. Despite this, 20th Century Studios did promote the film.); Regency Enterprises; Entertainment One; New Regency; Keep Your Head; Entertainment 360; Film Rites
- Distributed by: Hulu
- Release date: March 18, 2022
- Running time: 115 minutes
- Countries: United States; Canada
- Language: English
- Budget: $49 million

Deep Water is a 2022 erotic psychological thriller film directed by Adrian Lyne, from a screenplay by Zach Helm and Sam Levinson, based on the 1957 novel of the same name by Patricia Highsmith. The film stars Ben Affleck and Ana de Armas, with Tracy Letts, Lil Rel Howery, Dash Mihok, Finn Wittrock, Kristen Connolly, and Jacob Elordi appearing in supporting roles. It marks Lyne's return to filmmaking after a 20-year absence since his last film, Unfaithful (2002).

Deep Water was released on Hulu on March 18, 2022, following several delays due to the COVID-19 pandemic.

== Plot ==
Melinda and Vic Van Allen live with their young daughter Trixie in Little Wesley, Louisiana. Vic has retired early after developing guidance chips for combat drones, and his complicated relationship with Melinda is held together by a precarious arrangement: they sleep apart and Melinda takes lovers openly, even in their family home, while Vic finds solace in raising his large collection of snails. Their open marriage is no secret to their concerned friends, and Vic grows increasingly jealous, while Melinda laments his lack of passion.

Melinda invites her latest lover, Joel, to a neighbour's party. Alone with Joel, Vic tells him that he murdered Melinda's previous lover Martin, who has recently disappeared. The story spreads through their circle of friends, raising the suspicions of noir writer Don Wilson. Joel comes to dinner with the Van Allen family, and Vic elaborates in private that he killed Martin with a hammer, frightening Joel into leaving town. A TV news report reveals that Martin's body has been found shot to death, and a suspect is arrested.

Vic confronts Melinda after she gives money to Charlie, her new lover and piano teacher. She invites Charlie to a friend's pool party and introduces him to Vic, toying with his jealousy. Rain sends everyone inside, leaving Vic and Charlie alone in the water. After Melinda discovers Charlie's body drowned in the pool, the party is questioned by police, and Melinda is quick to accuse Vic of murdering Charlie. He later asks if she is scared of him, and she says she is not as "I'm the one you killed for".

Don's wife Kelly tells Vic that Don and Melinda have been accusing him of Charlie's murder. Vic discovers they have hired a private investigator to follow him and confronts Don in front of Don's family. Melinda reconnects with an old boyfriend, Tony, and Vic overhears their conversation suggesting they will move to Brazil, taking Trixie with them. She invites Tony to dinner with Vic and takes him to her bedroom, furthering Vic's jealousy.

Vic lures Tony into his car and drives Tony to a secluded spot he and Melinda share, overlooking a rocky gorge. He throws stones at Tony, causing him to fall down the hill to his death, and sinks his body in the creek. Melinda takes Vic and their daughter on a picnic to the same spot. Vic gives her a collection of photographs he has surreptitiously taken of her as a testament to his love, but spots Tony's body resurfaced in the creek. Returning home, he offers to go back to the spot in the morning to retrieve Melinda's lost scarf. She notifies Don, but invites Vic to share her bed that night.

The next day, Vic bikes to the creek to deal with Tony's body, but is caught in the act by Don. Don rushes away in his car to notify authorities. Vic pursues him on his bike and takes a shortcut through the brush to try to head Don off. Vic tumbles out of the bushes and falls off his bike into the car's path; texting recklessly, Don swerves to avoid Vic but drives off a cliff and is killed. At home, Melinda finds Tony's wallet in one of Vic's snail vivaria. She packs a suitcase to leave, which Trixie throws in the pool, insisting they stay. She then burns Tony's wallet and ID cards. When Vic arrives home Melinda tells him that she "saw Tony".

== Cast ==
- Ben Affleck as Vic Van Allen
- Ana de Armas as Melinda Van Allen
- Tracy Letts as Don Wilson
- Grace Jenkins as Trixie Van Allen
- Dash Mihok as Jonas Fernandez
- Rachel Blanchard as Kristin Peterson
- Kristen Connolly as Kelly Wilson
- Jacob Elordi as Charlie De Lisle
- Lil Rel Howery as Grant
- Brendan C. Miller as Joel Dash
- Jade Fernandez as Jen Fernandez
- Finn Wittrock as Tony Cameron
- Michael Braun as Jeff Peterson
- Devyn Tyler as Mary Washington
- Michael Scialabba as Kevin Washington
- Jeff Pope as Chief Nichols
- Paul Teal as Deputy Clark
- Juliet Brett as Chelsea (Babysitter)
- Damon Lipari as Carlyle
- Joel R. Martinez as David Ricigliani
- Jaren Mitchell as John
- Ahmad Harhash as Sam

== Production ==
The project began development in 2013, with Adrian Lyne set to direct and Fox 2000 Pictures set to finance. Fox 2000 sold the rights to New Regency in 2018. In August 2019, the project saw new developments; Ben Affleck and Ana de Armas agreed to star, with Walt Disney Studios Motion Pictures agreeing to handle the distribution via their 20th Century Studios label. In October 2019, Tracy Letts and Rachel Blanchard joined the cast of the film.

Filming began in New Orleans on November 4, 2019, with the additions of Dash Mihok, Lil Rel Howery, Jacob Elordi, Kristen Connolly, Jade Fernandez and Finn Wittrock to the cast. In December 2019, Michael Braun joined the cast of the film.

== Release ==
Deep Water was originally scheduled to be released on November 13, 2020, but was delayed to August 13, 2021, and again to January 14, 2022. On December 9, 2021, it was taken off the release schedule. Four days later, it was reported that the film would move to a Hulu-exclusive release in the United States and an Amazon Prime Video–exclusive release internationally. On February 14, 2022, it was announced that the film would be released on Hulu on March 18, 2022, and on Prime Video for a simultaneous international release.

== Reception ==
=== Audience viewership ===
According to Samba TV, 826,000 U.S. households watched Deep Water during its first weekend on Hulu. According to the streaming aggregator Reelgood, Deep Water was the 4th most streamed movie across all platforms, during the week of March 23, 2022, the 4th during the week of March 27, 2022, and the 6th during the week of April 7, 2022.

=== Critical response ===
On the review aggregator website Rotten Tomatoes, 35% of 233 critics' reviews are positive, with an average rating of 4.9/10. The website's consensus reads: "Viewers desperately seeking a new erotic thriller might find Deep Water worth a dip, but it's far from director Adrian Lyne's best work." Metacritic, which uses a weighted average, assigned the film a score of 53 out of 100, based on 46 critics, indicating "mixed or average" reviews.

Natalia Keogan of Paste rated the film 8 out of 10, asserting, "There's a very good chance that the film's zero-sum game will not appeal to everyone, least of all those who flip it on with the hopes of a tumultuous sex-fueled affair. More akin to the similarly Affleck-starring Gone Girl than Fifty Shades of Grey—or if we're using Lyne's filmography as a reference, more akin to Lolita than An Indecent Proposal—Deep Water is a sweat-inducing psychological scheme that is constantly aiming to intrigue and titillate. The paperback pulp origins of Highsmith's original story are kept intact, alleviating any semblance of eye-roll worthy ridiculousness that doesn't at least try to make an interesting point. As each shocking revelation tacks on another clue in the sprawling mystery, the audience isn't sure just who or what to believe—making the film's fiery ending all the more jaw-dropping." Rex Reed of Observer Media gave Deep Water a grade of 3 out of 4 stars, writing, "Deep Water has shock effects when and where you least expect them. It's the kind of riveting and dynamic thriller from start to finish we used to take for granted in the good old days, don't see much anymore, and could definitely use a lot more of."

David Rooney of The Hollywood Reporter appreciated Lyne's return to filmmaking, but gave the film a negative review and wrote, "Lyne's take on the material, scripted without distinction by Zach Helm and Sam Levinson, manages to drain all the subtlety and psychological complexity from Highsmith's story of marital warfare, transgression and obsession." Adam Nayman of The Ringer said, "Thrillers that don't quite stick the landing are common, and considering rumors of a troubled production, Deep Water is far from a disaster—or from the salacious camp classic the online hordes seem to be clamoring for. But it's also not good enough to serve as ground zero for some larger renewal of the erotic thriller. The frustration lies in watching people who know what they're doing fail to completely pull it off; the residual feeling is one of a missed opportunity. In the funniest—and most overtly Hitchcockian moment—Vic watches as something he'd tried his best to hide winds up coming back into plain sight. Affleck's half-guilty, half-impatient expression is hilarious, as is his half-hearted attempt to push the incriminating thing back out of view. It's the perfect emblem for a movie that isn't really trying to submerge its flaws."
