= Andy Garcia =

American actor (born 1956)

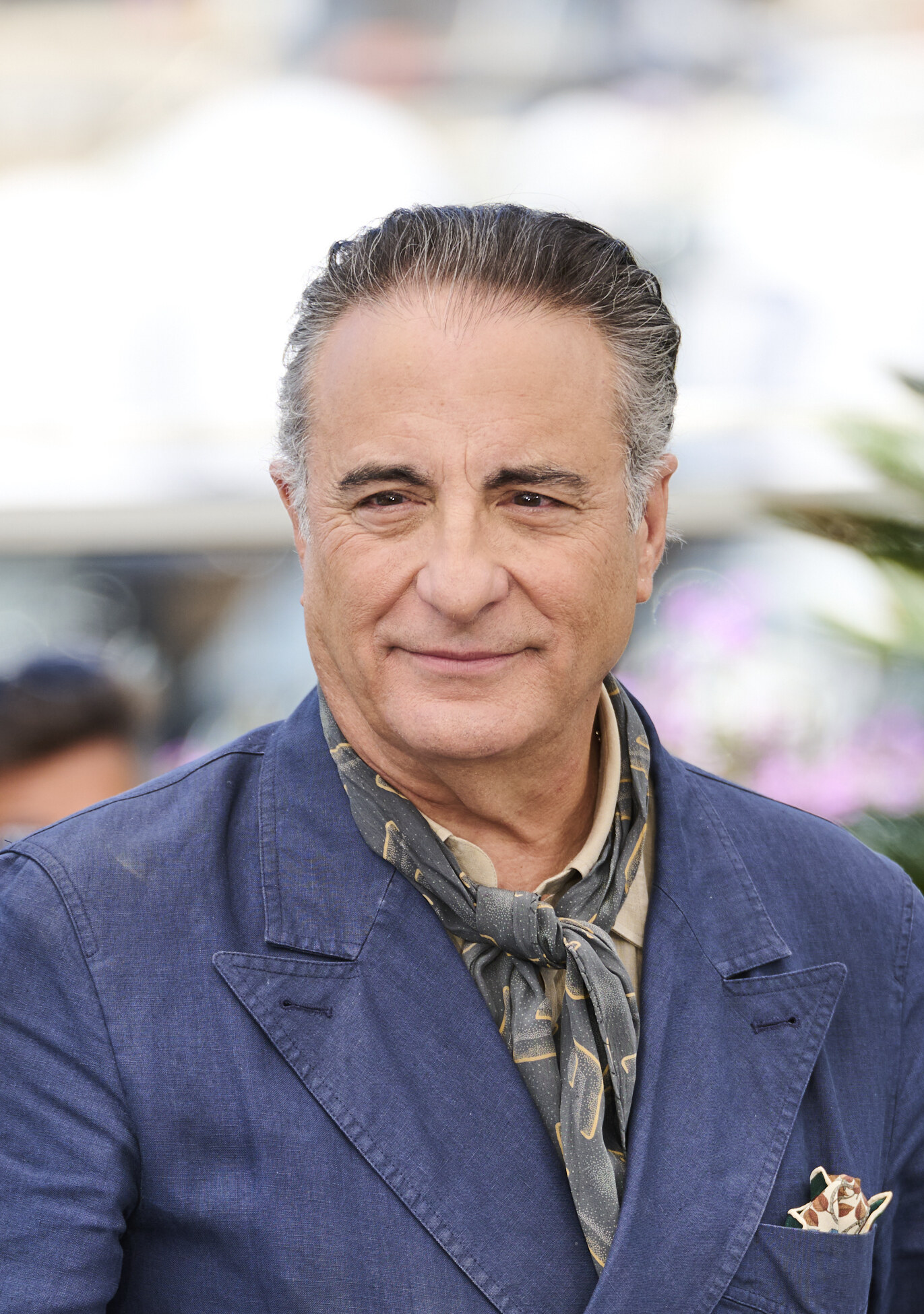
- Garcia in 2026
- Born: Andrés Arturo García Menéndez; April 12, 1956 (age 70); Havana, La Habana, Cuba
- Citizenship: United States
- Education: Florida International University
- Occupations: Actor; director; producer; musician
- Years active: 1978–present
- Spouse: Marivi Lorido García (m. 1982)
- Children: 4, including Dominik García-Lorido

Andrés Arturo García Menéndez (born April 12, 1956) is a Cuban-American actor, director, producer, and musician. Known for his roles in film and television, he has received a Grammy Award, as well as nominations for an Academy Award, two Golden Globe Awards and two Primetime Emmy Awards. He first rose to prominence acting in Brian De Palma's The Untouchables (1987) followed by roles in Stand and Deliver (1988), Black Rain (1989) and Internal Affairs (1990). He then portrayed Vincent Mancini in Francis Ford Coppola's The Godfather Part III (1990), earning a nomination for the Academy Award for Best Supporting Actor and becoming the first Cuban to be nominated for an acting Oscar.

He continued to act in Hollywood films such as Stephen Frears' Hero (1992), the romantic drama When a Man Loves a Woman (1994), and the action thriller Desperate Measures (1998). He also starred in Steven Soderbergh's Ocean's Eleven (2001) and its sequels, Ocean's Twelve (2004) and Ocean's Thirteen (2007). He also took roles in New York, I Love You (2008), the dramedy City Island (2009), the romantic comedy At Middleton (2013), and the crime thriller Kill the Messenger (2014), Mamma Mia! Here We Go Again, Book Club, The Mule (all 2018), and as the title role in the Father of the Bride remake (2022). He made his directorial debut with The Lost City (2005), followed by Diamond (2026).

For television, he portrayed the title role in the HBO television film, For Love or Country: The Arturo Sandoval Story (2000), which he also produced. His performance earned him nominations for the Primetime Emmy Awards and Golden Globe Award. He portrayed Ricardo Montalbán in the HBO television movie My Dinner with Hervé (2018). He stars in the Paramount+ neo-western series Landman (2025–present).

In 2005, he won both a Grammy and a Latin Grammy Award for producing Cuban musician Cachao's record ¡Ahora Sí!.

== Early life and education ==
Andy Garcia was born Andrés Arturo García Menéndez in Havana, La Habana Province, Cuba. His mother, Amelie Menéndez, was an English teacher and his father, René García, was an attorney in Cuba. Garcia has two older siblings, a sister named Tessi and a brother named René. When he was five years old, his family moved to Miami, Florida after the failed 1961 Bay of Pigs Invasion. Over a period of several years, they built up a million-dollar perfume/fragrance company. Garcia stated that his family tree is of Spanish descent. He was raised as a Catholic and attended Miami Beach Senior High School, where he played on the basketball team. During his senior year of high school, he became ill with mononucleosis, which convinced him to pursue a career in acting. He began his acting career that year by taking a drama class with Jay W. Jensen. He graduated from Florida International University.

== Career ==
=== 1980s ===
Garcia began acting at Florida International University but soon went to Hollywood. He had a short role alongside Angela Lansbury in "The Murder of Sherlock Holmes", the first episode of Murder, She Wrote as "1st White Tough", in 1984. He played the role of a gang member in "Hill Street Station", the first episode of TV series Hill Street Blues. He appeared in a supporting role in The Mean Season in 1985, alongside Kurt Russell.

In 1987, Garcia received an acting breakthrough in Brian De Palma's crime drama The Untouchables. The film starred Kevin Costner, Sean Connery, Charles Martin Smith, Patricia Clarkson, and Robert De Niro. The film follows Eliot Ness as he forms the Untouchables law enforcement team to bring Al Capone to justice during the Prohibition era. It received widespread critical acclaim and was a financial success.

In 1989, Garcia acted in the Ridley Scott action thriller Black Rain with Michael Douglas as Detective Charlie Vincent. The film received mixed reviews from critics but was a financial success, earning $134 million.

=== 1990s ===
In 1989, Francis Ford Coppola cast Garcia as Vincent Mancini, the illegitimate son of Sonny Corleone (James Caan), in The Godfather Part III (1990). The film stars Al Pacino, Diane Keaton, and Eli Wallach. The film concludes the story of Michael Corleone (Pacino), the patriarch of the Corleone family, who attempts to legitimize his criminal empire. For his performance, Garcia earned an Academy Award nomination for Best Supporting Actor at the 63rd Academy Awards, as well as a Golden Globe Award nomination for Best Supporting Actor at the 48th Golden Globe Awards. Garcia is the first Cuban to be nominated for an acting Oscar.

In the 1990s, Garcia appeared in the Mike Figgis film Internal Affairs, in which his character Raymond Avilla engages in a battle of wits with a corrupt fellow police officer Dennis Peck, played by Richard Gere. In 1992, he played John Bubber, a cynical everyman in Stephen Frears' Hero starring Dustin Hoffman, Geena Davis, and Joan Cusack. That same year, he co-starred with Uma Thurman in the thriller Jennifer 8. In 1994, he played Michael Green, the enabling husband of Alice, an alcoholic played by Meg Ryan in When a Man Loves a Woman. In 1995, he portrayed Jimmy "The Saint" Tosnia, a tragic criminal in Things to Do in Denver When You're Dead alongside Christopher Lloyd, Steve Buscemi, and Christopher Walken. He starred as Sean Casey, a hotshot lawyer in the 1996 Sidney Lumet drama Night Falls on Manhattan alongside Richard Dreyfus, and James Gandolfini. He played mobster Lucky Luciano in Hoodlum (1997) alongside Tim Roth, and Laurence Fishburne. He portrayed a Detective Frank Conner, cop trying to save his gravely ill son Matthew (Joseph Cross) in the 1998 action thriller Desperate Measures starring Michael Keaton and Marcia Gay Harden.

=== 2000s ===
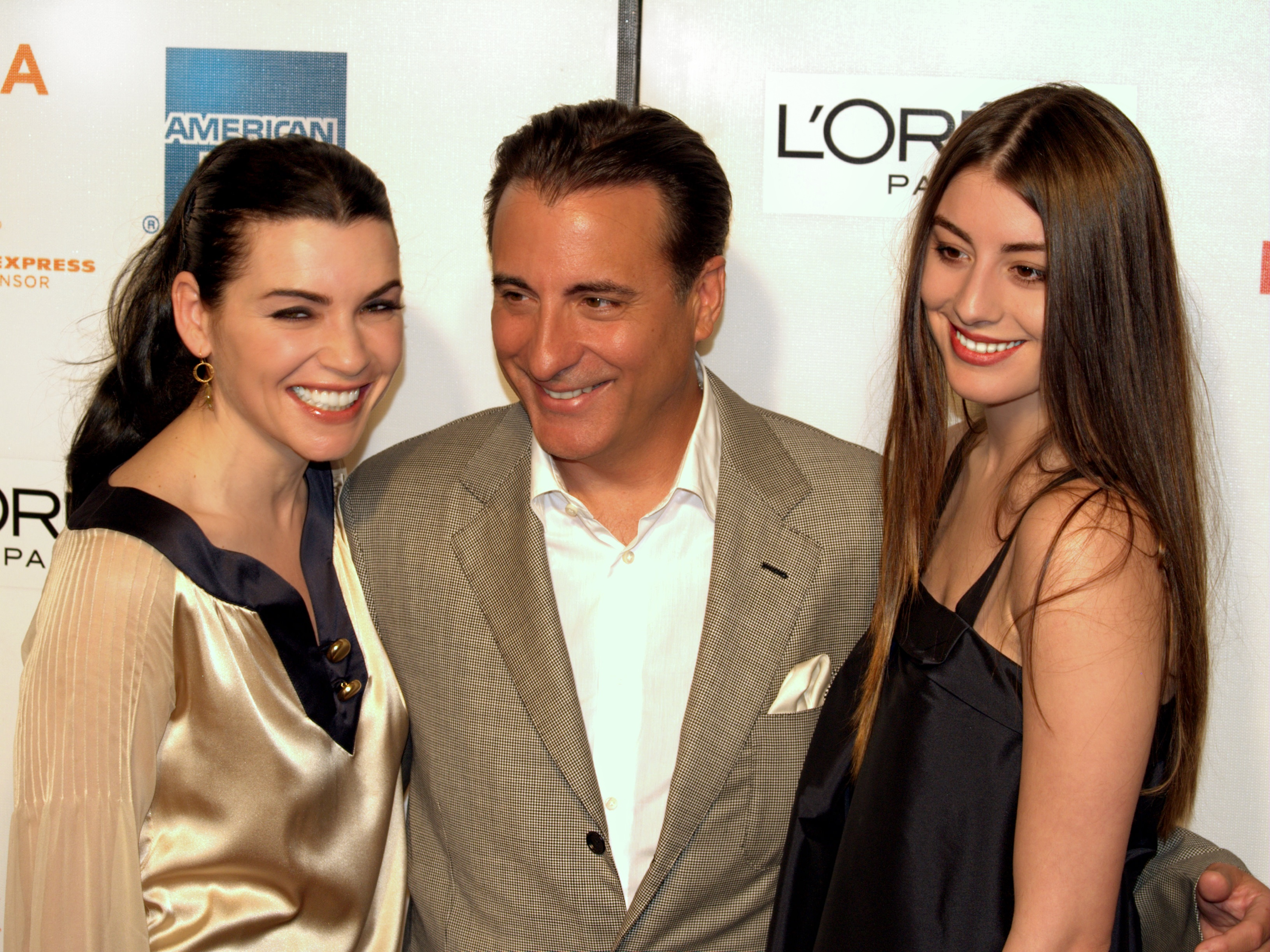
At the 2009 Tribeca Film Festival with Julianna Margulies (left) and his daughter Dominik García-Lorido

In 2000, Garcia starred and produced the HBO film, For Love or Country: The Arturo Sandoval Story. The film is about Cuba's jazz scene and the life of trumpeter and composer Arturo Sandoval. It starred Gloria Estefan as Emilia, and Charles S. Dutton as jazz legend Dizzy Gillespie. For his performance, Garcia received nominations for the Primetime Emmy Award for Outstanding Lead Actor in a Limited or Anthology Series or Movie at the 53rd Primetime Emmy Awards and the Golden Globe Award for Best Actor – Miniseries or Television Film at the 58th Golden Globe Awards.

Garcia portrayed the arrogant Las Vegas casino owner Terry Benedict in Steven Soderbergh's Ocean's Eleven (2001), a remake of the 1960 Rat Pack caper movie starring George Clooney, Brad Pitt, Matt Damon, and Julia Roberts. The film was a massive commercial success earning $450 million at the box office. He also appeared in the sequels Ocean's Twelve (2004), and Ocean's Thirteen (2007).

Garcia co-wrote, directed, and starred in The Lost City alongside Dustin Hoffman and Bill Murray. In 2005, he appeared in the last two episodes of the Turkish TV series Valley of the Wolves, along with Sharon Stone. In 2008, he starred in the first segment of New York, I Love You which was directed by Jiang Wen starring Hayden Christensen and Rachel Bilson.

Since 2009, Garcia has been slated to direct the film Hemingway & Fuentes about writer Ernest Hemingway, co-written by Garcia and Hemingway's niece Hilary Hemingway. They secured financing for the film in 2012, and Garcia himself, Anthony Hopkins, and Annette Bening were announced as stars. Filming was originally to have begun in January 2013, but due to delays, Hopkins left the project in 2014 and was replaced by Jon Voight.

=== 2010s ===
Towards the end of the 2010s, Garcia had a career resurgence. He starred in four films in 2018. He appeared as Fernando Cienfuegos in the critical and commercial success Mamma Mia! Here We Go Again alongside Cher, Amanda Seyfried, Lily James, Colin Firth, Stellan Skarsgård, and Pierce Brosnan. When asked about singing with Cher, Garcia told NBC's Today show, "It was sublime. One thing is to act with Cher who is a great actress and then to be asked to sing with her".

Garcia also starred in the Paramount romantic comedy, Book Club, alongside Diane Keaton, Candice Bergen, Jane Fonda, and Mary Steenburgen. The film was a box office success grossing over $89 million worldwide against its $10 million budget. He also starred in Clint Eastwood's drama film, The Mule alongside Eastwood, Bradley Cooper, Dianne Wiest, Laurence Fishburne and Michael Peña. It grossed $174.8 million and received positive reviews from critics. Garcia appeared in the HBO movie My Dinner with Hervé alongside Peter Dinklage and Jamie Dornan. The film received generally positive reviews from critics, and received an Emmy nomination for Outstanding Television Movie.

=== 2020s ===
In 2020, Garcia starred in Charles McDougall's comedic film Ana. Also that year, he starred in Thor Freudenthal's critically acclaimed coming of age drama Words on Bathroom Walls. The following year, he made an uncredited cameo in the comedy film Barb and Star Go to Vista Del Mar starring Kirsten Wiig and Jamie Dornan. That same year, he starred in the action films Redemption Day and the Guy Ritchie film Wrath of Man.

In 2022, he starred in the comedy Big Gold Brick. He also starred opposite Gloria Estefan again in the romantic comedy HBO Max film Father of the Bride. It is the third filmed version of the 1949 novel of the same name by Edward Streeter.Time praised Garcia on his comedic turn writing, "Garcia carries the film ably with his gruff elegance".

Garcia appeared in the 2023 action comedy film Expend4bles as Marsh, a CIA agent who is also a double agent and the main antagonist of the film.

== Personal life ==
Garcia met his now-wife, Marivi Lorido, when they were both students at Florida International University during the mid-'70s when they first saw each other in a Miami nightclub. The couple dated for seven years before marrying on September 24, 1982. They had their honeymoon in Spain. The family divides their time between Toluca Lake, Los Angeles, and Key Biscayne, Florida.

They have four children: Dominik García-Lorido, Daniella, Alessandra, and Andrés. Dominik was born on August 16, 1983, in Miami, Florida. She is married to Michael Doneger. Daniella was born on January 3, 1988, in Los Angeles, California. She is married to actor Stephen Borrello and the couple has a daughter named Violette Rose. Alessandra was born on June 20, 1991, in Los Angeles. The fourth child and only son, Andrés, was born on January 28, 2002. He has gone on to become an established DJ across Los Angeles and Miami.

Garcia has often expressed his distaste for the communist regime that has governed Cuba since the revolution. Following Fidel Castro's death in November 2016, Garcia criticized his legacy, stating: "It is necessary for me to express the deep sorrow that I feel for all the Cuban people...that have suffered the atrocities and repression caused by Fidel Castro and his totalitarian regime."

Garcia is Catholic, and a naturalized citizen of the United States.

== Filmography ==
=== Film ===
Key
†	Denotes films that have not yet been released

Year	Title	Role	Notes
1983	Blue Skies Again	Ken Lagarmarsino	
1983	Guaguasi	Ricardo	
1983	A Night in Heaven	T. J.	
1984	The Lonely Guy		Uncredited
1985	The Mean Season	Ray Martínez	
1986	8 Million Ways to Die	Angel Maldonado	
1987	The Untouchables	Agent George Stone/Giuseppe Petri	
1988	Stand and Deliver	Dr. Ramírez	
1988	American Roulette	Carlos Quintas	
1989	Black Rain	Det. Charlie Vincent	
1990	Internal Affairs	Raymond Avilla	
1990	A Show of Force	Luis Ángel Mora	
1990	The Godfather Part III	Vincent Mancini	
1991	Dead Again	Gray Baker	
1992	Hero	John Bubber	
1992	Jennifer 8	Sgt. John Berlin	
1994	When a Man Loves a Woman	Michael Green	
1995	Things to Do in Denver When You're Dead	Jimmy "The Saint" Tosnia	
1995	Dangerous Minds		Scenes deleted
1995	Steal Big Steal Little	Ruben Partida Martinez / Robert Martin / Narrator	
1996	Night Falls on Manhattan	Sean Casey	
1996	The Disappearance of Garcia Lorca	Federico García Lorca	
1997	Hoodlum	Charlie "Lucky" Luciano	
1998	Desperate Measures	Frank Conner	
1999	Just the Ticket	Gary Starke	Also producer
2000	Lakeboat	Guigliani	
2001	The Unsaid	Michael Hunter	Also executive producer; Direct-to-video
2001	The Man from Elysian Fields	Byron Tiller	Also producer
2001	Ocean's Eleven	Terry Benedict	
2003	Confidence	Special Agent Gunther Butan	
2003	Just Like Mona		
2004	Twisted	Mike Delmarco	
2004	Modigliani	Amedeo Modigliani	Also executive producer
2004	Ocean's Twelve	Terry Benedict	
2005	The Lazarus Child	Jack Heywood	
2005	The Lost City	Fico Fellove	Also executive producer and director
2006	Smokin' Aces	Stanley Locke	
2007	The Air I Breathe	Fingers	
2007	Ocean's Thirteen	Terry Benedict	
2008	New York, I Love You	Garry	
2008	Beverly Hills Chihuahua	Delgado	Voice
2009	The Pink Panther 2	Insp. Vicenzo Brancaleone	
2009	City Island	Vince Rizzo	Also producer
2009	The Line	Javier Salazar	
2010	Across the Line: The Exodus of Charlie Wright	Jorge Garza	
2011	5 Days of War	Mikheil Saakashvili	
2012	For Greater Glory	Enrique Gorostieta Velarde	
2012	A Dark Truth	Jack Begosian	
2013	Open Road	Chuck	
2013	At Middleton	George Hartman	
2014	Let's Be Cops	Detective Brolin	
2014	Kill the Messenger	Norwin Meneses	
2014	Rob the Mob	Big Al	
2014	Rio 2	Eduardo	Voice
2016	Ghostbusters	Mayor Bradley	
2016	Max Steel	Dr. Miles Edwards	
2016	True Memoirs of an International Assassin	El Toro	
2016	Passengers	Admiral Norris	
2017	Geostorm	President Andrew Palma	
2018	Bent	Jimmy Murtha	
2018	Book Club	Mitchell	
2018	Mamma Mia! Here We Go Again	Fernando Cienfuegos	
2018	The Mule	Laton	
2019	Against the Clock	Gerald Hotchkiss	
2020	Ana	Rafael "Rafa" Rodriguez	
2020	Words on Bathroom Walls	Father Patrick	
2021	Redemption Day	Ambassador Williams	
2021	Barb and Star Go to Vista Del Mar	Tommy Bahama	Uncredited
2021	Wrath of Man	FBI Agent King	
2022	Big Gold Brick	Floyd Deveraux	
2022	Father of the Bride	Guillermo "Billy" Herrera	Also executive producer
2023	Miranda's Victim	Alvin Moore	
2023	Book Club: The Next Chapter	Mitchell	
2023	Pain Hustlers	Jack Neel	
2023	Expend4bles	Marsh	
2024	What About Love	Peter Tarlton	
2024	Long Gone Heroes	Roman	
2025	Eenie Meanie	Nico	
2025	Under the Stars	Giacomo	
2026	Diamond	Joe Diamond	Also director, writer, and producer
2026	72 Hours	Drug Lord	
TBA	Maserati: The Brothers †		Post-production
TBA	The Prince †		Post-production

=== Television ===
Year	Title	Role	Notes
1978	¿Qué Pasa, USA?	Pepe	Episode: "Here Comes the Bride"
1979	Archie Bunker's Place	Manuel	Episode: "Building the Restaurant"
1981, 1984	Hill Street Blues	Street Kid; Ernesto	Episodes: "Hill Street Station" & "Hair Apparent"
1983	For Love and Honor	Medic	Episode: "For Love and Honor" (pilot)
1984	Murder, She Wrote	Tough Guy #1	Episode: "The Murder of Sherlock Holmes" (pilot)
1984	Brothers	Jose	Episode: "Happy Birthday Me!"
1985	The New Alfred Hitchcock Presents	Alejandro	Episode: "Breakdown"
1986	Foley Square	Performer	Episode: "The Star"
1988	Clinton and Nadine	Clinton Dillard	Television movie
1999	Swing Vote	Joseph Michael Kirkland	Television movie
2000	For Love or Country: The Arturo Sandoval Story	Arturo Sandoval	Television movie; also producer
2001	Frasier	Terrance	Episode: "Bully for Martin"
2003	Will & Grace	Milo	Episode: "Field of Queens"
2005	Valley of the Wolves	Amon	2 episodes
2006	George Lopez	Ray	Episode: "George Doesn't Trustee Angie's Brother"
2009	The National Parks: America's Best Idea	Various roles	Voice; Documentary
2010	Top Gear	Himself	Series 15, episode 4
2011	The Simpsons	Slick Publisher	Voice; Episode: "The Book Job"
2012	Dora the Explorer	Don Quixote	Voice; Episode: "Dora's Knighthood Adventure" & "Dora's Royal Rescue"
2012	Dora's Royal Rescue	Don Quixote	Television movie
2013	Christmas in Conway	Duncan Mayor	Television movie
2013	Doll & Em	Andy	Episode: "Five"
2014	Valley of the Wolves: Ambush	Amon	3 episodes
2016	Ballers	Andre Allen	6 episodes
2018	My Dinner with Hervé	Ricardo Montalbán	Television movie
2018–19	3Below: Tales of Arcadia	King Fialkov	Voice; 7 episodes
2019	Modern Love	Michael	2 episodes
2019	Raul Julia: The World's a Stage	Himself	Documentary, American Masters
2020	Flipped	Rumualdo	5 episodes
2020	Elena of Avalor	Hetz	Voice; Episode: "Coronation Day"
2021	Rebel	Julian Cruz	Main role
2024	Moon Girl and Devil Dinosaur	Pad-Varr	Voice; Episode: "Kid Kree"
2024	All Access with Andy Garcia	Himself	All episodes
2025	Landman	Danny 'Gallino' Morrell	Many Episodes. Among them: "The Crumbs of Hope"

== Awards and nominations ==
=== Major associations ===
Year	Award	Category	Nominated work	Result
1991	Academy Awards	Best Supporting Actor	The Godfather Part III	Nominated
1991	Golden Globe Awards	Best Supporting Actor – Motion Picture	The Godfather Part III	Nominated
2001	Golden Globe Awards	Best Actor – Miniseries or Television Film	For Love or Country: The Arturo Sandoval Story	Nominated
2001	Primetime Emmy Awards	Outstanding Lead Actor in a Miniseries or Movie	For Love or Country: The Arturo Sandoval Story	Nominated
2001	Primetime Emmy Awards	Outstanding Made for Television Movie	For Love or Country: The Arturo Sandoval Story	Nominated
2005	Grammy Awards	Best Traditional Tropical Latin Album	¡Ahora Si! (Shared with Cachao and Eric Schilling)	Won

=== Miscellaneous awards ===
Year	Award	Category	Nominated work	Result
1986	New York Film Critics Circle Awards	Best Supporting Actor	8 Million Ways to Die	Nominated
1991	Chicago Film Critics Association Awards	Best Supporting Actor	The Godfather Part III	Nominated
1995	MTV Movie Awards	Most Desirable Male	When a Man Loves a Woman	Nominated
1997	Nostros Golden Eagle Awards	Outstanding Performer in Film	—N/a	Won
1998	ALMA Awards	Outstanding Actor in a Feature Film	Night Falls on Manhattan	Nominated
1998	ALMA Awards	Outstanding Actor in a Feature Film	The Disappearance of Garcia Lorca	Nominated
1999	ALMA Awards	Outstanding Actor in a Feature Film in a Crossover Role	Desperate Measures	Won
2000	ALMA Awards	Outstanding Actor in a Feature Film	Just the Ticket	Nominated
2001	ALMA Awards	Outstanding Host of a Variety or Awards Special	Latin Grammy Awards (Shared with Gloria Estefan, Jennifer Lopez and Jimmy Smits)	Nominated
2001	Satellite Awards	Best Actor – Miniseries or Television Film	For Love or Country: The Arturo Sandoval Story	Nominated
2002	ALMA Awards	Outstanding Supporting Actor in a Motion Picture	Ocean's Eleven	Won
2002	Phoenix Film Critics Society Awards	Best Acting Ensemble	Ocean's Eleven	Nominated
2005	Critics' Choice Movie Awards	Best Acting Ensemble	Ocean's Twelve	Nominated
2005	Latin Grammy Awards	Best Traditional Tropical Album (Shared with Cachao)	¡Ahora Si!	Won
2007	ALMA Awards	Best Director – Motion Picture	The Lost City	Nominated
2007	Teen Choice Awards	Choice Movie: Chemistry	Ocean's Thirteen	Nominated
2010	Satellite Awards	Best Actor in a Motion Picture – Musical or Comedy	City Island	Nominated
2012	ALMA Awards	Favorite Movie Actor	For Greater Glory	Nominated
2013	Boston Film Festival	Best Actor	At Middleton	Won
2015	Annie Awards	Outstanding Voice Acting in a Feature Production	Rio 2	Nominated
2022	San Diego International Film Festival	Gregory Peck Award	Lifetime Achievement	Awarded

== Other honors ==
- 1995: Received a Star on the Hollywood Walk of Fame
- 2002: Desert Palm Achievement Award at the Palm Springs International Film Festival
- 2006: Received the Anthony Quinn Award for Achievement in Motion Pictures from The American Latino Media Arts Award
- 2019: Medalla de Oro al Mérito en las Bellas Artes

Garcia was announced as a 2026 Kennedy Center Honoree on November 2, 2026. The ceremony will take place on December 7, 2026.

== See also ==
- List of Cuban Academy Award winners and nominees
- List of actors with Academy Award nominations
- List of Cuban Americans
- List of people from Miami

== External links and further reading ==
- Andy Garcia at IMDb
- Andy Garcia at the TCM Movie Database (archived)
- "Andy Garcia interview on his City Island diet". Finance Foodie. March 2010.
- "Andy Garcia interview for Smokin' Aces". MovieHole.net. Archived from the original on January 11, 2007.
- Boutilier, Corey (Executive Director) (March 21, 2006). "Video: Andy Garcia at the Miami Film Festival and his new independent film 'Lost City' (Andy speaks to independentfilm.com about his new film set in 1950s Cuba. The film had an emotional screening at the 2006 Miami International Film Festival. (TRT 5min, 9MB)". IndependentFilm.com.
- Bradshaw, Lisa. "Andy Garcia – Film star returns to Ghent after 22 years: 'I've come full circle'". Flanders Today. Archived from the original on November 24, 2010.
- "Photos "Cristiada": Andy García filming in Durango, México". HoyCinema.com Blogs.
- Andy Garcia at The Independent Institute
