= La corona (film) =

2008 film

- Directed by: Amanda Micheli
- Produced by: Luis Colina
- Edited by: Luis Colina; Carla Gutierrez
- Production company: Runaway Films
- Distributed by: HBO (TV); The Cinema Guild (non-theatrical)
- Release date: January 2008 (Sundance)
- Running time: 40 minutes
- Country: United States
- Language: Spanish

La corona is a 2008 short American documentary film about a beauty pageant in a Colombian prison for women, directed by Amanda Micheli. It was nominated for an Academy Award for Best Documentary Short.
