= Amanda Micheli =

American film director

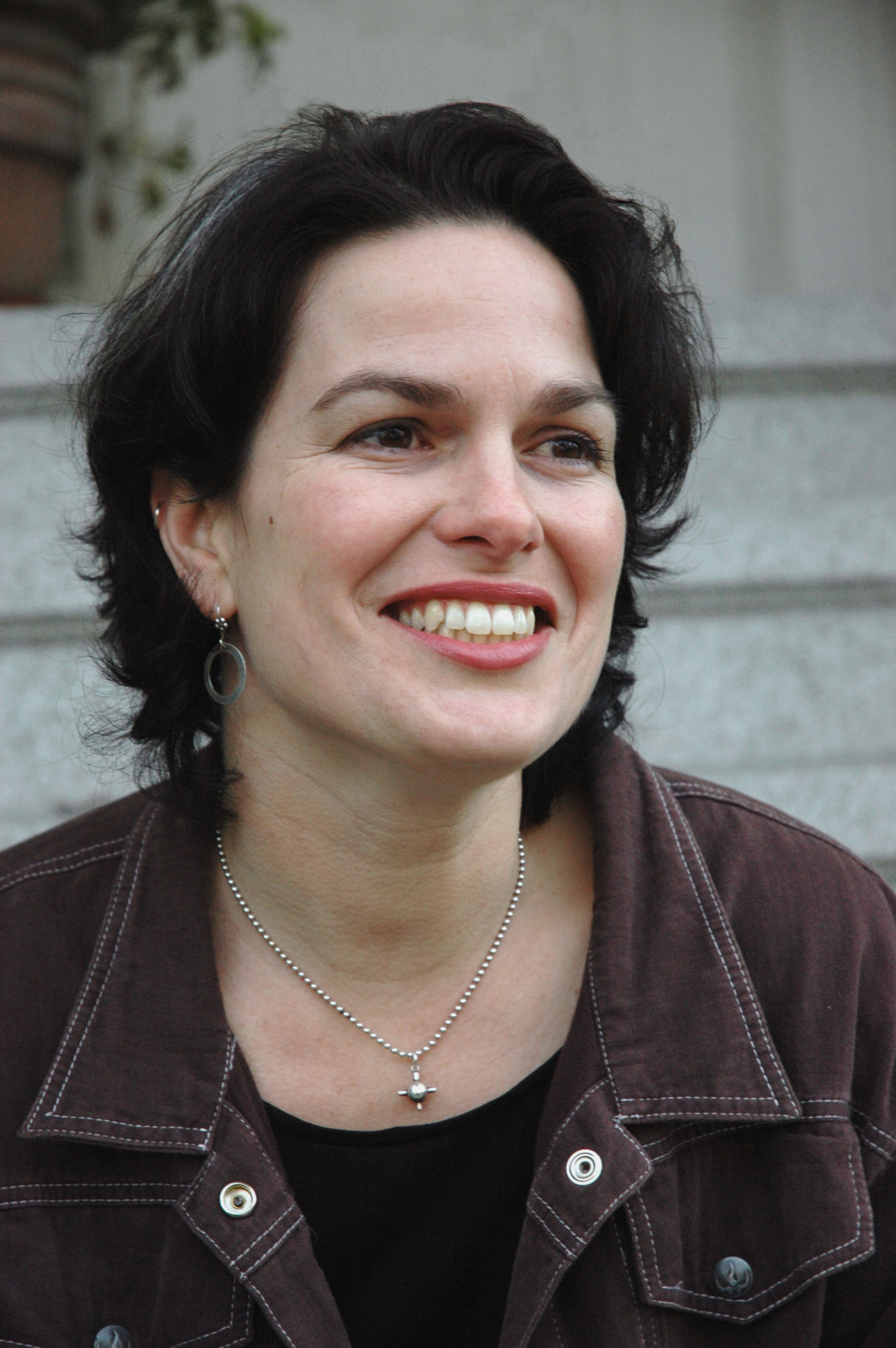
- Born: Boston, Massachusetts
- Education: Harvard University
- Occupations: Film director / producer, cinematographer

Amanda Micheli is an American film director and the founder of Runaway Films. Her films have received Emmy and Academy Award nominations and have won awards at global film festivals.

Micheli directed Halftime, a documentary featuring Jennifer Lopez, focusing on her mid-life career and performance at the Super Bowl LIV halftime show. It opened the Tribeca Film Festival in June 2022 and premiered on Netflix on June 14, 2022.

Her 2018 film Vegas Baby, which examines the complexities of America’s fertility industry, earned an Emmy nomination for PBS. Micheli also earned an Academy Award nomination in 2009 for La Corona, which followed a beauty pageant in a Colombian women’s prison. The film, which she co-directed with Isabel Vega, premiered at the Sundance Film Festival before airing on HBO.

Micheli’s 2004 documentary Double Dare explores the lives of two Hollywood stuntwomen. It premiered at the Toronto International Film Festival and was broadcast on PBS before its theatrical release. The documentary features interviews with Steven Spielberg, Quentin Tarantino, and Lynda Carter, and won the Audience Award at AFI, as well as Best Documentary at the Woodstock Film Festival.

Micheli’s first film, Just for the Ride, about the cowgirls who founded the first professional women’s sports association in America, won a Student Academy Award and an International Documentary Association Award in 1995. It premiered on the PBS series POV the following year.

In addition to directing, Micheli has also served as Director of Photography and Producer on multiple projects. In 2014, she produced Slomo, which won the Documentary Shorts Jury Award at SXSW and Best Short from the International Documentary Association. She also co-directed One Nation Under Dog for HBO, which received a Television Academy Honor for “Television with a Conscience.”

She was producer and cinematographer on the 2006 HBO documentary Thin, about women in a residential treatment facility for anorexia, and on HBO’s 2007 Cat Dancers. She was also supervising producer on Russell Simmons’s Brave New Voices. Additional cinematography credits include Morgan Spurlock’s premiere episode of 30 Days (FX), My Flesh and Blood (HBO), The Flute Player (PBS), and Witches in Exile.

Micheli graduated from Harvard University and is a member of the Directors Guild of America and the Academy of Motion Picture Arts and Sciences. She has directed commercial projects for clients including Nike, Google, and Verizon, and served as a Creative Director at MasterClass and a visiting lecturer in the MFA film program at Stanford University.

In June 2022, she signed with the United Talent Agency. She was an All-American in women’s rugby and went on to play for the Berkeley All-Blues Rugby Club and the USA Eagles.

== Film and television ==
Year	Title	Credited as
2025	The Bend in the River	Cinematographer
2025	Taurasi	Consulting Producer
2022	Halftime	Director
2020	MasterClass: Ron Finley Teaches Gardening	Director
2019	MasterClass: Chris Voss Teaches the Art of Negotiation	Director
2016	Vegas Baby	Director / Producer / Director of Photography
2016	Religion of Sports: The New West	Director / Writer
2013	Slomo	Producer
2013	Nine for IX: The 99ers	Consulting Producer
2012	One Nation Under Dog	Director / Cinematographer
2011	The Save	Director / Director of Photography
2009	Russell Simmons Presents Brave New Voices	Supervising Producer
2008	La Corona	Director / Producer / Director of Photography
2007	Cat Dancers	Producer / Director of Photography
2006	Thin	Producer / Director of Photography
2006	Too Hot Not to Handle	Director of Photography
2005	You're Gonna Miss Me	Associate Producer
2005	Smitten	Director of Photography
2005	30 Days: Minimum Wage	Director of Photography (credited as Amanda Miceli)
2005	Both	Director of Photography
2004	Witches in Exile	Director of Photography
2004	Lookalike	Cinematographer
2004	Double Dare	Director / Producer / Director of Photography
2003	Freshman Diaries	Field Producer / Cinematographer
2003	The Flute Player	Director of Photography
2003	My Flesh and Blood	Director of Photography
2003	Same River Twice	Cinematographer
1995	Just for the Ride	Director / Producer / Editor / Director of Photography
