= List of Academy Award winners and nominees from Cuba =

This is a list of Cuban Academy Award winners and nominees. This list details the performances of Cuban filmmakers, actors, actresses and films that have either been submitted, nominated or have won an Academy Award.

== Acting ==
=== Best Actress ===
Academy Award for Best Actress
Year	Nominee	Film	Status	Notes	Ref(s)
2022 (95th)	Ana de Armas	Blonde	Nominated	First Cuban actress to be nominated for an acting Academy Award. First Cuban actor to be nominated in a leading acting category.	

=== Best Supporting Actor ===
Academy Award for Best Supporting Actor
Year	Nominee	Film	Status	Notes	Ref(s)
1990 (63rd)	Andy García	The Godfather Part III	Nominated	First Cuban to be nominated for an acting Academy Award.	

== Best Original Song ==
Academy Award for Best Original Song
Year	Nominee	Film	Song	Status	Notes	Ref(s)
1942 (15th)	Ernesto Lecuona	Always in My Heart	"Always in My Heart"	Nominated	First person from a Caribbean country to be nominated in any category. (Shared with Kim Gannon).	

== Best International Feature Film ==
This list focuses on Cuban films that won or were nominated for the Best International Feature Film award.

Academy Award for Best International Feature Film
Year	Director(s)	Film	Status	Notes	Ref(s)
1994 (67th)	Tomás Gutiérrez Alea & Juan Carlos Tabío	Fresa y Chocolate	Nominated		

== See also ==
- Cinema of Cuba
- List of Cuban films
