= List of Academy Award winners and nominees from Chile =

This is a list of Chilean Academy Award winners and nominees. It includes both Chilean films and individuals from Chile who have been nominated for or have won an Academy Award.

Seven Chilean films have been nominated, resulting in two wins. Additionally, Chilean individuals have received eight nominations for non-Chilean productions, securing two victories.

== Best Animated Short ==
This list focuses on Chilean films that won or were nominated for the Animated Short award.

Best Animated Short
Year	Film	Name	Status	Milestone / Notes	Ref.
2015 (88th)	Bear Story	Gabriel Osorio Vargas; Pato Escala Pierart	Won	First Latin American-produced animated short film to be nominated for and win an Academy Award.	
2021 (94th)	Bestia	Hugo Covarrubias; Tevo Díaz	Nominated		

This list focuses on animated short films directed by Chilean-born filmmakers.

Best Animated Short
Year	Name	Film	Status	Milestone / Notes	Ref.
1994 (67th)	Vanessa Schwartz	The Janitor	Nominated	Canadian-produced film.	

== Best Cinematography ==
This list focuses on Chilean films that won or were nominated for the Best Cinematography award.

Best Cinematography
Year	Film	Name	Status	Milestone / Notes	Ref.
2023 (96th)	El Conde	Edward Lachman	Nominated		

This list focuses on Chilean-born cinematographers.

Best Cinematography
Year	Name	Film	Status	Milestone / Notes	Ref.
2008 (81st)	Claudio Miranda	The Curious Case of Benjamin Button	Nominated		
2012 (85th)	Claudio Miranda	Life of Pi	Won		

== Best Documentary Feature Film ==
This list focuses on Chilean films that won or were nominated for the Documentary Feature award.

Best Documentary Feature
Year	Film	Name	Status	Milestone / Notes	Ref.
2020 (93rd)	The Mole Agent	Maite Alberdi; Marcela Santibáñez	Nominated		
2023 (96th)	The Eternal Memory	Maite Alberdi	Nominated		

== Best International Feature Film ==
This list focuses on Chilean films that won or were nominated for the Best International Feature Film award.

Best International Feature Film
Year	Film	Director	Status	Milestone / Notes	Ref.
2012 (85th)	No	Pablo Larraín	Nominated		
2017 (90th)	A Fantastic Woman	Sebastián Lelio	Won	Lelio was born in Argentina to a Chilean mother, but was raised in Chile.	

This list focuses on Chilean-born directors that won or were nominated for the Best International Feature Film award for a film submitted by a different country.

Best International Feature Film
Year	Director	Film	Status	Milestone / Notes	Ref.
1975 (48th)	Miguel Littin	Letters from Marusia	Nominated	Submitted by Mexico.	
1982 (55th)	Miguel Littin	Alsino and the Condor	Nominated	Submitted by Nicaragua. Second nomination for Best Foreign Language Film to a film directed by Littín. Only Latin American director to receive nominations for films directed in two different countries.	
2004 (77th)	Alejandro Amenábar	The Sea Inside	Won	Submitted by Spain. Amenábar was born in Chile to a Chilean father, but was raised in Spain.	

== Best Original Score ==
This list focuses on scores by Chilean-born composers.

Best Original Score
Year	Name	Film	Status	Milestone / Notes	Ref.
1970 (43rd)	Herbert W. Spencer	Scrooge	Nominated	Spencer was a Chilean-born American composer and orchestrator. Nominated for Best Music, Original Song Score. Shared nomination with English-born Leslie Bricusse and Ian Fraser.	
1973 (46th)	Herbert W. Spencer	Jesus Christ Superstar	Nominated	Nominated for Best Music, Scoring Original Song Score and/or Adaptation. Shared nomination with English-born Andrew Lloyd Webber and German-American André Previn.	

== Nominations by decade ==
Decade	1970s	1980s	1990s	2000s	2010s	2020s	Total
Chilean films	-	-	-	-	3	4	7
Chileans in foreign films	3	1	1	2	1	-	8
Total	3	1	1	2	4	4	15

== See also ==
- List of Chilean submissions for the Academy Award for Best Foreign Language Film
- Cinema of Chile
- List of Chilean films
