= List of Academy Award winners and nominees from Argentina =

This is a list of Argentine Academy Award winners and nominees. This list details the performances of Argentine filmmakers, actors, actresses and films that have either been submitted, nominated or have won an Academy Award.

== Best International Feature Film ==
This list focuses on Argentine films.

Best International Feature Film
Year	Film	Director	Status	Milestone / Notes
1974	The Truce	Sergio Renán	Nominated	(original title: La tregua)
1984	Camila	María Luisa Bemberg	Nominated	first nomination for Best Foreign Language Film to a film directed by a Latin American woman director
1985	The Official Story	Luis Puenzo	Won	(original title: La historia oficial) first Latin American film to win for Best Foreign Language Film, the film was also nominated for Best Original Screenplay
1998	Tango	Carlos Saura	Nominated	(original title: Tango, no me dejes nunca)
2001	Son of the Bride	Juan José Campanella	Nominated	(original title: El hijo de la novia)
2009	The Secret in Their Eyes	Juan José Campanella	Won	(original title: El secreto de sus ojos) second nomination for Best Foreign Language Film to a film directed by Juan José Campanella, and first to win; second Argentine, and Latin American, film to win for Best Foreign Language Film
2014	Wild Tales	Damián Szifron	Nominated	(original title: Relatos salvajes)
2022	Argentina, 1985	Santiago Mitre	Nominated	(original title: Argentina, 1985)

== Best Supporting Actress ==
This list focuses on Argentine-born actors and actresses.

Supporting Actress
Year	Name	Film	Status	Milestone
1987	Norma Aleandro	Gaby: A True Story	Nominated	
2011	Bérénice Bejo	The Artist	Nominated	

== Best Art Direction ==
This list focuses on Argentine-born art directors.

Art Direction
Year	Name	Film	Status	Milestone
1995	Eugenio Zanetti	Restoration	Won	
1998	Eugenio Zanetti	What Dreams May Come	Nominated	Shared with Cindy Carr (set decoration)

== Best Director ==
This list focuses on Argentine-born directors.

Director
Year	Name	Film	Status	Milestone
1985	Héctor Babenco	Kiss of the Spider Woman	Nominated	

== Best Visual Effects ==
This list focuses on Argentine-born visual effects people.

Visual Effects
Year	Name	Film	Status	Milestone
2002	Pablo Helman	Star Wars: Episode II – Attack of the Clones	Nominated	
2005	Pablo Helman	War of the Worlds	Nominated	
2019	Pablo Helman; Leandro Estebecorena; Nelson Sepulveda-Frauser	The Irishman	Nominated	Shared with Stéphane Grabli
2024	Nelson Sepulveda-Frauser	Alien: Romulus	Nominated	Shared with Eric Barba, Daniel Macarin, and Shane Mahan
2024	Pablo Helman	Wicked	Nominated	Shared with Jonathan Fawkner, David Shirk, and Paul Corbould

== Best Original Screenplay ==
This list focuses on Argentine-born screenwriters.

Original Screenplay
Year	Name	Film	Status	Milestone
1985	Aída Bortnik; Luis Puenzo	La historia oficial	Nominated	
2014	Armando Bó; Nicolás Giacobone	Birdman	Won	Shared with Alejandro González Iñárritu and Alexander Dinelaris, Jr.

== Best Story ==
This list focuses on Argentine-born screenwriters.

Writing-Story
Year	Name	Film	Status	Milestone / Notes
1930/1931	Harry d'Abbadie d'Arrast	Laughter	Nominated	Nomination shared with Douglas Z. Doty and Donald Ogden Stewart. Harry d'Abbadie d'Arrast was an Argentine-born French screenwriter.
This category was abolished after the 29th Academy Awards.

== Best Original Score ==
This list focuses on Argentine-born composers.

Original Score
Year	Name	Film	Status	Milestone
1966	Luis Enríquez Bacalov	Il vangelo secondo Matteo	Nominated	
1968	Lalo Schifrin	Cool Hand Luke	Nominated	
1969	Lalo Schifrin	The Fox	Nominated	the Academy Award category was "Best Music, Original Score for a Motion Picture (not a Musical)"
1977	Lalo Schifrin	Voyage of the Damned	Nominated	
1980	Lalo Schifrin	The Amityville Horror	Nominated	
1984	Lalo Schifrin	The Sting II	Nominated	the Academy Award category was "Best Music, Original Song Score and Its Adaptation or Best Adaptation Score"
1985	Jorge Calandrelli	The Color Purple	Nominated	
1995	Luis Enríquez Bacalov	Il postino	Won	The Academy Award category was "Best Music, Original Dramatic Score"
2005	Gustavo Santaolalla	Brokeback Mountain	Won	
2006	Gustavo Santaolalla	Babel	Won	first (and only) Argentine to win two consecutive Oscars in the same category

== Best Original Song ==
This list focuses on Argentine-born composers.

Original Song
Year	Name	Film	Status	Milestone
1981	Lalo Schifrin	The Competition	Nominated	for the song "People Alone"; shared with Will Jennings
2000	Jorge Calandrelli	Wo hu cang long	Nominated	for the song "A Love Before Time"; shared with Tan Dun and James Schamus

== Best Documentary Feature Film ==
This list focuses on Argentine films.

Best Documentary Feature
Year	Name	Film	Status	Milestone / Notes
1985	Susana Blaustein Muñoz	The Mothers of Plaza de Mayo	Nominated	Shared with Lourdes Portillo

== Best Documentary Short Film ==
This list focuses on films directed by Argentine-born filmmakers.

Best Documentary Short Subject
Year	Name	Film	Status	Milestone / Notes
1980	Jorge Preloran	Luther Metke at 94	Nominated	

== Best Animated Short Film ==
This list focuses on films produced by Argentine-born individuals.

Best Animated Short Film
Year	Name	Film	Status	Milestone / Notes
2009	Nicolas Schmerkin	Logorama	Won	

== Special awards ==
This list focuses on Argentine-born honorees.

Academy Honorary Award
Year	Name	Status	Milestone / Notes
2018	Lalo Schifrin	Honored	"in recognition of his unique musical style, compositional integrity and influential contributions to the art of film scoring."

== Nominees by decade ==
Decade	1930s	1960s	1970s	1980s	1990s	2000s	2010s	2020s	Total
Argentine films	-	-	1	4	1	2	1	2	11
Argentines in foreign films	1	3	1	7	3	6	3	-	24
Total	1	3	2	11	4	8	4	2	35

== See also ==
- Cinema of Argentina
- List of Argentine films
