= Patricia Highsmith bibliography =

List of works by or about Patricia Highsmith, American novelist.

== Novels ==
- Strangers on a Train (1950)
- The Price of Salt (1952) (as Claire Morgan) (republished as Carol in 1990 under Highsmith's name)
- The Blunderer (1954)
- Deep Water (1957)
- A Game for the Living (1958)
- This Sweet Sickness (1960)
- The Cry of the Owl (1962)
- The Two Faces of January (1964)
- The Glass Cell (1964)
- A Suspension of Mercy (1965) (published as The Story-Teller in the USA)
- Those Who Walk Away (1967)
- The Tremor of Forgery (1969)
- A Dog's Ransom (1972)
- Edith's Diary (1977)
- People Who Knock on the Door (1983)
- Found in the Street (1986)
- Small g: a Summer Idyll (1995)

The "Ripliad"

1. The Talented Mr. Ripley (1955)
2. Ripley Under Ground (1970)
3. Ripley's Game (1974)
4. The Boy Who Followed Ripley (1980)
5. Ripley Under Water (1991)

== Other books ==
- Miranda the Panda Is on the Veranda (1958) with Doris Sanders. LCCN 58-13323. (children's book of verse and illustrations)
- Plotting and Writing Suspense Fiction (1966). LCCN 66-11138. (enlarged and revised edition, 1981, ISBN 0871161257)

== Short story collections ==
- Eleven (1st ed.). London, England: Heinemann. 1970. ISBN 043433510-X. LCCN 70529159. (Foreword by Graham Greene)

Published by Doubleday in the USA as The Snail-Watcher and other stories

The Snail-Watcher (Gamma, 1964); The Birds Poised to Fly; The Terrapin (Ellery Queen's Mystery Magazine); When the Fleet Was in at Mobile (London Life); The Quest for "Blank Claveringi" (Saturday Evening Post); The Cries of Love (Woman's Journal); Mrs. Afton, Among Thy Green Braes (EQMM); The Heroine (Harper's Bazaar); Another Bridge to Cross (EQMM); The Barbarians (La Revue da Poche); The Empty Birdhouse (EQMM).

- The Animal Lover's Book of Beastly Murder (1st ed.). London, England: Heinemann. 1975. ISBN 0434335150. LCCN 76353019. Contains the following short stories:

Chorus girl’s absolutely final performance; Djemal’s revenge; There I was, stuck with bubsy; Ming's biggest prey; In the dead of truffle season; The bravest rat in Venice; Engine horse; The day of reckoning; Notes from a respectable cockroach; Eddie and the monkey robberies; Hamsters vs. Websters; Harry: a ferret; Goat ride.

- Kleine Geschichten für Weiberfeinde [Little Tales of Misogyny] (in German) (1st ed.). Zurich, Switzerland: Diogenes Verlag. 1975. ISBN 3257015291. OCLC 164714942. Contains the following short stories in the 1977 English translation:

The hand; Oona, the jolly cave woman; The coquette; The female novelist; The dancer; The invalid, or The bed-ridden; The artist; The middle-class housewife; The fully-licensed whore, or The wife; The breeder; The mobile bed-object; The perfect little lady; The silent mother-in-law; The prude; The victim; The evangelist; The perfectionist.

- Slowly, Slowly in the Wind (1st ed.). London, England: Heinemann. 1979. ISBN 0434335193. LCCN 79313859. Contains the following short stories:

The man who wrote books in his head; The network; The pond; Something you have to live with; Slowly, slowly in the wind; Those awful dawns; Woodrow Wilson's neck-tie; One for the islands; A curious suicide; The baby spoon; Broken glass; Please don't shoot the trees.

- The Black House (1st ed.). London, England: Heinemann. 1981. ISBN 0434335185. OCLC 979175409. Contains the following short stories:

Something the cat dragged in; Not one of us; The terrors of basket-weaving; Under a dark angel's eye; I despise your life; The dream of the Emma C; Old folks at home; When in Rome; Blow it; The kite; The black house.

- Mermaids on the Golf Course (1st ed.). London, England: Heinemann. 1985. ISBN 0434335231. LCCN 89181861. Contains the following short stories:

Mermaids on the golf course; The button; Where the action is; Chris's last party; A clock ticks at Christmas; A shot from nowhere; The stuff of madness; Not in this life, maybe the next; I am not as efficient as other people; The cruellest month; The romantic.

- Tales of Natural and Unnatural Catastrophes (1st ed.). London, England: Bloomsbury. 1987. ISBN 0747500975. OCLC 16465968. Contains the following short stories:

The mysterious cemetery; Moby Dick II, or The missile whale; Operation Balsam, or Touch-me-not; Nabuti; Sweet freedom! And a picnic on the White House lawn; Trouble at the Jade Towers; Rent-a-Womb vs. the mighty right; No end in sight; Sixtus VI, Pope of the Red Slipper; President Buck Jones rallies, and waves the flag.

- Chillers. London, England: Penguin Books. 1990. ISBN 0140130667. OCLC 282235802. (publication of Highsmith stories broadcast on US television series Chillers)
- The Selected Stories of Patricia Highsmith (1st ed.). New York: W. W. Norton & Company. 2001. ISBN 0393020312. LCCN 2001030878. OCLC 46683544.
- Nothing That Meets the Eye: The Uncollected Stories (1st ed.). New York: W. W. Norton & Company. 2002. ISBN 0393051870. OCLC 50416533.
- Under a Dark Angel's Eye: The Selected Stories of Patricia Highsmith (1st ed.). London, England: Virago Press. 2021. ISBN 9780349014760. OCLC 1231465064. (Introduction by Carmen Maria Machado).

== Collected works ==
- Patricia Highsmith: Selected Novels and Short Stories (1st ed.). New York: W. W. Norton & Company. 2011. ISBN 9780393080131. LCCN 2010034589. OCLC 601102853.

== Essays and articles ==
- "The Sense of Form," The Writer, January 1948
- "Suspense in Fiction," The Writer, December 1954
- "Introduction" (1977), The World of Raymond Chandler. Miriam Gross, ed., Weidenfeld and Nicolson, United Kingdom: London. ISBN 0297773623. LCCN 78-300757. OL 4275277M
- Keating, H. R. F., ed. (1982). "Not-Thinking With the Dishes, by Patricia Highsmith". Whodunit? A Guide to Crime, Suspense & Spy Fiction (1st ed.). London, England: Windward. pp. 92–93. ISBN 0-7112-0249-4.
- "Foreword" (1987), Crime and Mystery: The 100 Best Books. H. R. F. Keating, Xanadu, United Kingdom: London. ISBN 094776125X. LCCN 87-17377. OL 18769106M.
- "Scene of the Crime" (1989), Granta, Issue No. 29, Winter

== Miscellaneous ==
- Manson, Cynthia, ed. (1995). "The Empty Birdhouse, by Patricia Highsmith". Mystery Cats 3: More Feline Felonies. New York: Signet Books. ISBN 0451182936. OCLC 31876245.
- Tesdell, Diana Secker, ed. (2010). "One for the Islands, by Patricia Highsmith". Stories of the Sea (1st ed.). New York: Alfred A. Knopf. p. 191. ISBN 978-1841596051. LCCN 2009027592.

== Diaries and memoirs ==
- Patricia Highsmith (September 27, 2021). "A Portrait of the Writer as a Young Woman". The New Yorker. (Selections from Highsmith's diaries and notebooks.)
- von Planta, Anna, ed. (2021). Patricia Highsmith: Her Diaries and Notebooks, 1941–1995 (1st ed.). New York: Liveright. ISBN 978-1324090991.

== Biography, critical studies and reviews ==
Biography

- Bradford, Richard (2021). Devils, Lusts and Strange Desires: The Life of Patricia Highsmith (1st ed.). London, England: Bloomsbury Caravel. ISBN 978-1448217908.
- Harrison, Russell (1997). Patricia Highsmith (Twayne's United States Authors Series, No. 683) (1st ed.). New York: Twayne Publishers. ISBN 0-8057-4566-1.
- Schenkar, Joan (2009). The Talented Miss Highsmith: The Secret Life and Serious Art of Patricia Highsmith (1st ed.). New York: St. Martin's Press. ISBN 978-0312303754.
- Wilson, Andrew (2003). Beautiful Shadow: A Life of Patricia Highsmith (1st ed.). London, England: Bloomsbury. ISBN 978-0747563143.

Reviews

- Joshi, S. T. (2019). "Patricia Highsmith: Guilt and Innocence". Varieties of Crime Fiction (1st ed.). Wildside Press. pp. 122–137. ISBN 978-1479445462.
