= The Cry of the Owl (disambiguation) =

The Cry of the Owl is a 1962 novel by Patricia Highsmith.

The Cry of the Owl may also refer to:

- The Cry of the Owl (1987 film), a French film adaptation by Claude Chabrol
- The Cry of the Owl (1987 German film), a German TV adaptation by Tom Toelle
- The Cry of the Owl (2009 film), a British-Canadian-French-German film adaptation by Jamie Thraves
