= Sarah Hilary =

UK crime novelist

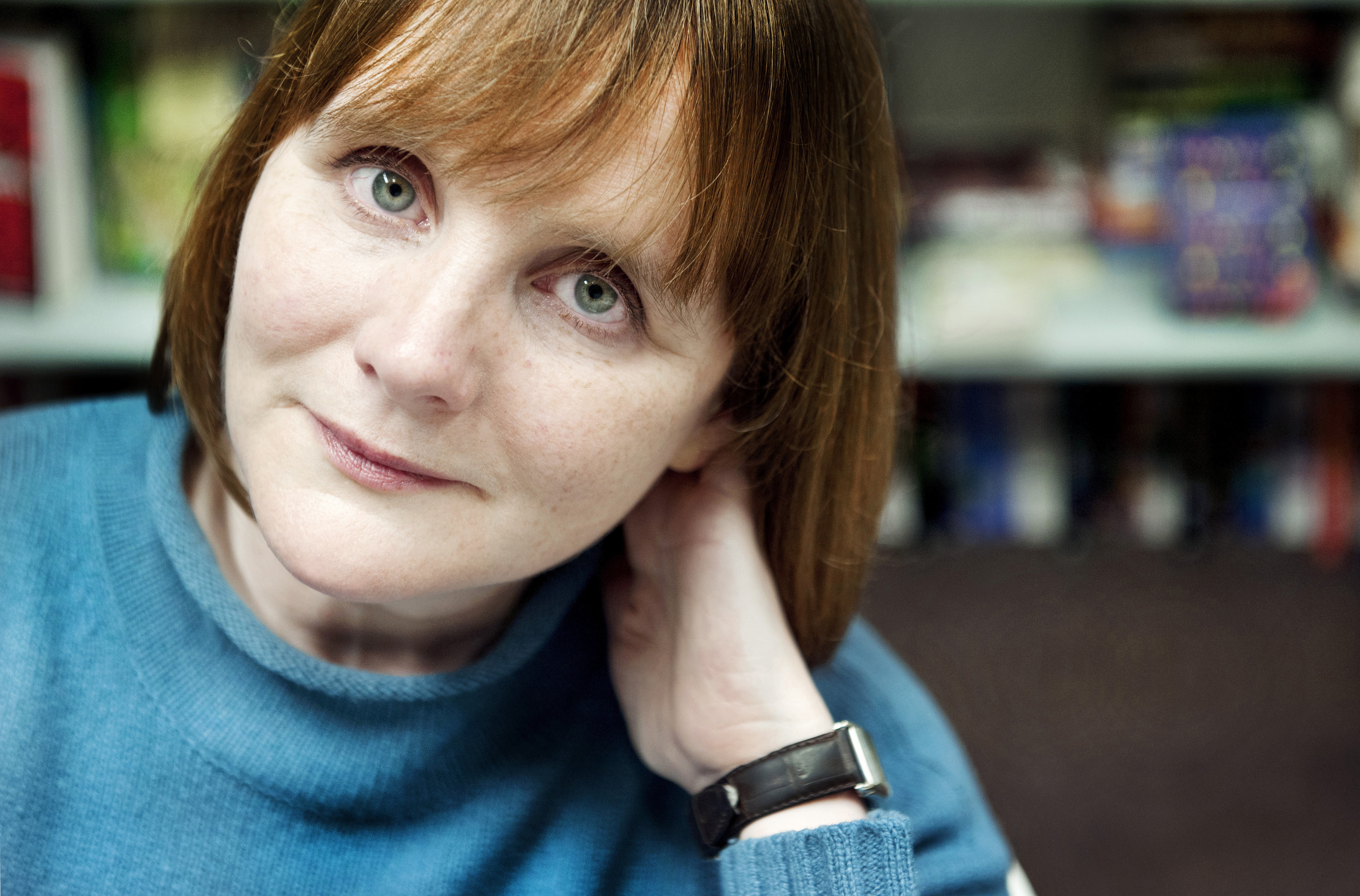
- Born: Cheshire, England
- Occupation: Novelist
- Writing career
- Genre: crime fiction
- Notable work: Marnie Rome series

Sarah Hilary is an English crime novelist known for her Marnie Rome series of novels. Her first novel, Someone Else's Skin, won the 2015 Theakston's Old Peculier Crime Novel of the Year Award.

== Early life and education ==
Hilary was born in Cheshire, England and later moved to the South East to study for a First Class Honours Degree in History of Ideas. Hilary announced on X on June 18, 2022, that she is autistic.

== Career ==
Sarah Hilary won the Fish Criminally Short Histories Prize in 2008 for her story, Fall River, in August 1892. In 2012, she was awarded with the Cheshire Prize for Literature.

She was 47 years old when her novel, Someone Else's Skin, was published in 2014 and was a Richard & Judy Book Club pick in the same year. It won the 2015 Theakston's Old Peculier Crime Novel of the Year Award, and in 2016, it was selected as one of the titles for World Book Night in the UK. It was also a Silver Falchion and Macavity Awards finalist in the US.

Her second book, No Other Darkness, published in 2015, was shortlisted for a Barry Award.

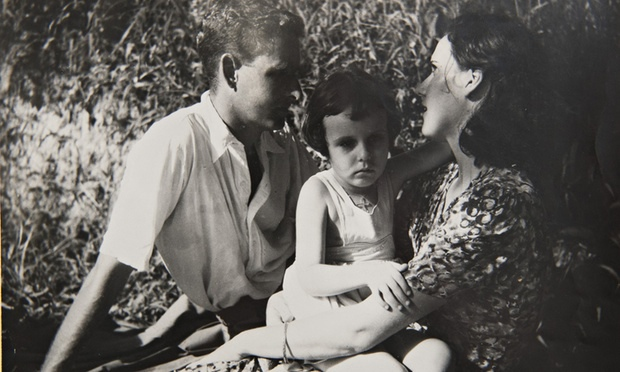
Sarah Hilary's grandparents and mother in a Japanese prison camp in Borneo, 1944

Hilary has written about her family history, most notably in "My Mother was Emperor Hirohito's Poster Child" for The Guardian, March 2014. Her mother and grandparents were prisoners of the Japanese in Batu Lintang camp where her grandfather, Stanley George Hill, died in 1945. Hilary wrote about her grandmother's experience in the camp for the Dangerous Women Project in 2017.

She wrote the introduction for Virago's new editions of three books by Patricia Highsmith republished in 2016: The Two Faces of January, This Sweet Sickness, and People Who Knock on the Door. Hilary talks about Highsmith's legacy for today's crime writers in A Gift for Killing, June 2016.

Her seventh novel, Fragile, published on 10 June 2021, is partly inspired by the motives of Daphne du Maurier's Rebecca.

In 2023, she published Black Thorn, a crime novel centred around six deaths at a seaside housing development in Cornwall. It received a positive review from Laura Wilson of The Guardian, who praised Hilary's writing style.

== Bibliography ==
=== Marnie Rome series ===
Title	Publisher	Published	ISBN
Someone Else's Skin	Headline	2014	978-1472207685
No Other Darkness	Headline	2015	978-1472207722
Tastes Like Fear	Headline	2016	978-1472236838
Quieter Than Killing	Headline	2017	978-1472241108
Come and Find Me	Headline	2018	978-1472248961
Never Be Broken	Headline	2019	978-1472249005

=== Other books ===
Fragile, Pan, 2021

Black Thorn, Macmillan, 2023

Sharp Glass, Macmillan, 2024
