= The Glass Cell =

The Glass Cell may refer to:

- The Glass Cell (novel), a 1964 novel by Patricia Highsmith
- The Glass Cell (film), a 1978 West German crime film, based on the novel
