= Edith's Diary (film) =

1983 film

- Ediths Tagebuch
- Directed by: Hans W. Geißendörfer
- Written by: Hans W. Geißendörfer
- Starring: Angela Winkler
- Cinematography: Michael Ballhaus
- Edited by: Helga Borsche
- Music by: Jürgen Knieper
- Release date: 1983
- Country: West Germany
- Language: German

Edith's Diary (German: Ediths Tagebuch) is a 1983 West German thriller-drama film written and directed by Hans W. Geißendörfer. It was entered into the main competition at the 40th edition of the Venice Film Festival.

The film is based on the novel with the same name by Patricia Highsmith.

== Cast ==
- Angela Winkler as Edith Baumeister
- Vadim Glowna as Paul Baumeister
- Leopold von Verschuer as Christian Baumeister
- Hans Madin as George
- Irm Hermann as Sabine Angerwolf
- Wolfgang Condrus as Berno Angerwolf
- Sona MacDonald as Kathanrina Ems
- Friedrich G. Beckhaus as Dr. Bleibig
- Werner Eichhorn as Dr. Starr
