= Mermaids on the Golf Course =

1985 collection of short stories by Patricia Highsmith

- First edition (publ. Heinemann)
- Author: Patricia Highsmith
- Language: English
- Publication date: 1985

Mermaids on the Golf Course (1985) is a collection of short stories by Patricia Highsmith, encompassing her standard themes of murder, violence, secrets, and insanity.

== Overview ==
The stories all serve as an exposé of the underbelly of American middle-class society, including the titular tale of a man whose near death experience casts a dark shadow over the rest of his days and another about a husband who exacts cruel revenge on his wife by exploiting her habit of preserving dead pets in their garden.

Other stories in the collection are set outside of the US. For example, "A Clock Ticks at Christmas" is set in France, and "A Shot From Nowhere" in Mexico. Both are countries in which Highsmith lived, and, like her novels, feature distinctly middle and upper-class characters.

== Contents ==
- "Mermaids on the Golf Course"
- "The Button"
- "Where the Action Is"
- "Chris's Last Party"
- "A Clock Ticks at Christmas"
- "A Shot from Nowhere"
- "The Stuff of Madness"
- "Not in This Life, Maybe the Next"
- "I Am Not As Efficient As Other People"
- "The Cruellest Month"
- "The Romantic"

== Reception ==
- One of the exhilarating effects of reading Highsmith's stories is their sure handedness, their amazing breadth and abundance. They compel attention and they add significantly to her already formidable presence. - James Lasdun, Washington Post
- A true master of the psychological thriller. - Bookforum
- An atmosphere of nameless dread, of unspeakable foreboding, permeates every page of Patricia Highsmith, and there's nothing quite like it. - Boston Globe
- It should not now be necessary to expound on Highsmith's great gift...Like Graham Greene, she knows she has no need to gesticulate. - The Times Literary Supplement
