= Karl Pruner =

Canadian actor

Karl Pruner is a Canadian actor whose most notable work is in portraying Canadian Prime Minister John Turner in the 2002 mini-series Trudeau.

== Career ==
Amongst his other work, he did voice acting as Beta Ray Bill in the short-lived animated series Silver Surfer. In 2003 he appeared in Burn: The Robert Wraight Story. In 1999, Pruner played detective Ian Farve, a leading role in the television series Total Recall: 2070.

In 2005, Pruner was elected president of the Toronto chapter of the ACTRA.

== Filmography ==
=== Film ===
Year	Title	Role	Notes
1988	The Good Mother	William	
1990	Thick as Thieves	Hal	
1999	Dick	Frank Jobs	
2001	Fall: The Price of Silence	Keith Taylor	
2002	Expecting	Jack	
2003	The Recruit	CIA Agent Dennis Slayne	
2004	Welcome to Mooseport	Dyer	
2004	Zeyda and the Hitman	Rex Ventura	
2005	The River King	Walter Pierce	
2008	Flash of Genius	Pete	
2009	The Cry of the Owl	Mr. Jaffe	
2010	Die	Zach Emmett	

=== Television ===
Year	Title	Role	Notes
1980	Matt and Jenny	Colin	Episode: "The Highlanders"
1980	The Littlest Hobo	Steve	Episode: "Duddleman and the Diamond Ring"
1987	Bluffing It	Simon	Television film
1988	Adderly	Russian Guard	Episode: "Covert Agenda"
1988	T. and T.	Jeff	Episode: "The Game"
1988	Street Legal	Michael Abbott	Episode: "State of Mind"
1988	The Twilight Zone	Martin Glazer	Episode: "There Was an Old Woman"
1989–1994	E.N.G.	Dan Watson	96 episodes
1991	The Hidden Room	Paul	Episode: "Dream Child"
1994	Forever Knight	Matthew	Episode: "Faithful Followers"
1995	Kung Fu: The Legend Continues	Anton Calvin	Episode: "Citizen Caine"
1995	Side Effects	Artie Collins	Episode: "Rust Proof"
1996	Road to Avonlea	Malcolm MacEwan	Episode: "Secrets and Sacrifices"
1996	Due South	John Taylor	Episode: "One Good Man"
1996	TekWar	Julian Lambert	Episode: "Betrayal"
1996	Hostile Advances: The Kerry Ellison Story	Alex	Television film
1996	Gotti	John Gleeson	Television film
1996–1997	Ready or Not	Stephen Bennett	13 episodes
1997	Wind at My Back	Percy Ardley	Episode: "Moonshine Struck"
1997	A Prayer in the Dark	Marcus Hayworth	Television film
1997	Nothing Sacred	Yuppie Lawyer	Episode: "Proofs for the Existence of God"
1997	Newton: A Tale of Two Isaacs	Isaac Newton	Television film
1998	When Husbands Cheat	Dennis Bell	Television film
1998	Psi Factor	David Vancha	Episode: "Kiss of the Tiger"
1998	This Matter of Marriage	Todd Stanfford	Television film
1998	The Fixer	David Corliss	Television film
1998	Silver Surfer	Beta Ray Bill	Episode: "Innervisions"
1998	The Wonderful World of Disney	Paul Klondike	Episode: "My Date with the President's Daughter"
1998	The Long Island Incident	Congressman #1	Television film
1998	Thanks of a Grateful Nation	The Voice	Television film
1999	Total Recall 2070	Ian Farve / The Maker	22 episodes
1999	In the Company of Spies	Jack Marko	Television film
1999	Mythic Warriors: Guardians of the Legend	Chiron	2 episodes
1999	War of 1812	Isaac Brock	4 episodes
2000	The Crossing	General Sullivan	Television film
2000	Twice in a Lifetime	Barry Lewis	Episode: "Old Flames"
2000	Catch a Falling Star	Dick Baker	Television film
2000	Finding Buck McHenry	Mr. Ross	Television film
2000	Mom's Got a Date with a Vampire	Count Krelski	Television film
2000	One True Love	Phil Davis	Television film
2001	Jackie, Ethel, Joan: The Women of Camelot	Clinton Hill	Television film
2001	The Associates	Martin Halford	Episode: "Care & Control"
2001	Sex, Lies & Obsession	Douglas Weiss	Television film
2001	I Was a Rat	Julian	3 episodes
2002	Doc	Michael Black	Episode: "Busy Man"
2002	Crossed Over	Henry Quinn	Television film
2002	Trudeau	John Turner	Television film
2002	The Interrogation of Michael Crowe	Detective Baker	Television film
2003	Burn: The Robert Wraight Story	Ed Zuterman	Television film
2003	Threshold	Quidd	Television film
2003	Mutant X	Simon Fletcher	Episode: "One Step Further"
2003	Bugs	Victor Petronovich	Television film
2003	The Elizabeth Smart Story	Detective Richard Klassen	Television film
2003	Thoughtcrimes	Maracek	Television film
2004	Snakes and Ladders	Bretts Ravenwood	Episode: "Section 24"
2004	The Skulls III	Martin Brooks	Television film
2004	Sue Thomas: F.B.Eye	Dallas Macon	Episode: "The Holocaust Survivor"
2004	A Mother's Gift	Professor	Television film
2004	Open Heart	Dale Wyman	Television film
2005	Puppets Who Kill	Puppets Who Kill	Episode: "Cuddles the Manchurian Candidate"
2005	Trudeau II: Maverick in the Making	F. R. Scott	Television film
2005	Tripping the Wire: A Stephen Tree Mystery	Detective Hank Girardin	Television film
2006	Angela's Eyes	Congressman Wade Keene	Episode: "Political Eyes"
2006	The Wives He Forgot	Judge	Television film
2006	The Path to 9/11	FAA Supervisor	2 episodes
2007	Tipping Point	Bill Strand	Television film
2008	The Trojan Horse	Charles Preston	Episode: "Part One"
2008	The Border	Quebec Premiere Bélanger	Episode: "Nothing to Declare"
2010	Living in Your Car	Principal	Episode: "Chapter Five"
2010	Happy Town	Priest	Episode: "Dallas Alice Doesn't Live Here Anymore"
2010	The 19th Wife	Sawyer Scott	Television film

== Awards ==
- 2004 Canadian Comedy Award - Expecting - Nominated (shared with Valerie Buhagiar, Deborah Day, Angela Gei, Karen Hill, Derwin Jordan, Debra McGrath, Tom Melissis, Colin Mochrie, Barbara Radecki, Cindy Stone) - Nominated
- 1990 Gemini Award for Best Performance by a Supporting Actor - E.N.G. - Nominated
