= This Sweet Sickness (film) =

Dites-lui que je l'aime
- Directed by: Claude Miller
- Written by: Claude Miller; Luc Béraud; Patricia Highsmith (novel)
- Produced by: Maurice Bernart; Hubert Niogret
- Starring: Gérard Depardieu; Miou-Miou
- Cinematography: Pierre Lhomme
- Edited by: Jean-Bernard Bonis
- Music by: Alain Jomy
- Production companies: Filmoblic; France 3 Cinema; Prospectacle
- Distributed by: AMLF
- Release date: 28 September 1977
- Running time: 107 minutes
- Country: France
- Language: French
- Box office: $3.5 million

Dites-lui que je l'aime (English: Tell Her I Love Her) is a 1977 French film directed by Claude Miller and starring Gérard Depardieu and Miou-Miou. It is based on the 1961 novel This Sweet Sickness by Patricia Highsmith.

== Plot ==
David Martinaud is an accountant who leaves town for the weekends on the pretense that he is going to his native home to care for his parents, who are in fact dead. He is really fixing up a chalet, where he intends to move in with Lise, a woman he has loved since childhood - even though Lise is married to another man and has a child.

Oblivious about Lise's married life, David begins stalking her, intent on making her love him by any means necessary. Another woman, Juliette, develops an interest in David; however, David remains obsessed with Lise, becoming increasingly delusional about their relationship.

== Cast ==
- Gérard Depardieu - David Martinaud
- Miou-Miou - Juliette
- Claude Piéplu - Chouin
- Jacques Denis - Gérard Dutilleux
- Dominique Laffin - Lise
- Christian Clavier - François
- Xavier Saint-Macary - Michel Barbet
- Véronique Silver - Madame Barbet
- Annick Le Moal - Camille
- Josiane Balasko - Nadine
- Michel Pilorgé - Maurice
- Jacqueline Jeanne - Jeanne
- Michel Such - Raymond
- Nathan Miller - Child

== Awards ==
The film received six César nominations, for best director, actor, actress, cinematography, production design and sound.

Highsmith, however, disliked the film.
