= The Black House =

1981 short story collection by Patricia Highsmith

- Author: Patricia Highsmith
- Publisher: First edition (publ. Heinemann)
- Publication date: January 1, 1981

The Black House (1981) is a collection of short stories by American author Patricia Highsmith.

== Contents ==
- "Something the Cat Dragged In"
- "Not One of Us"
- "The Terror of Basket-Weaving"
- "Under a Dark Angel's Eye"
- "I Despise Your Life"
- "The Dream of the Emma C"
- "Old Folks at Home"
- "When in Rome"
- "Blow It"
- "The Kite"
- "The Black House"

== Reception ==
- "Her short stories represent a relatively minor part of her achievement; but within their limits they are almost always compelling, as they are here." – The New York Times
- "The Black House runs true to a beguilingly upsetting form." – Event
- "Her stories are masterpieces of misanthropy and futility." – Irish Times
