= Edith's Diary =

1977 novel by Patricia Highsmith

- First edition
- Author: Patricia Highsmith
- Language: English
- Genre: Fiction
- Published: Heinemann, UK; Simon & Schuster, US
- Publication date: 1977
- Media type: Print
- Pages: 320

Edith's Diary (1977) is a psychological thriller novel by Patricia Highsmith, the seventeenth of her 22 novels. It was first published in the UK by Heinemann. One critic described it as "a relentless dissection of an unexceptional life that burns itself out from a lack of love and happiness".

== Composition ==
Highsmith replicated the dislocation she used in The Cry of the Owl years earlier, moving her characters from New York City to small-town Pennsylvania. She also replicated her own obsessive diary writing in the lead character. The dedication reads simply: To Marion, which was the way her sometime lover, Marion Aboudaram, asked to be referenced.

Knopf rejected the manuscript in 1976. It apparently encountered problems because of its failure to fit into the recognizable genres of crime, suspense, mystery, or even traditional fiction. It was published the next year, first by Heinemann in London, then by Simon & Schuster in New York.

As in most of Highsmith's novels, there is a murder committed in this one, though its significance for the plot and the characters is negligible.

== Synopsis ==
The novel describes "the externally and internally imposed exile of the discarded middle-aged woman". The story begins in the late 1950s and focuses on Edith Howland, a housewife who, with her journalist husband, Brett, and their 10-year-old son, Cliffie, relocates from New York City to small-town Pennsylvania. Cliffie has been exhibiting generally problematic and anti-social behavior; on the family's last night in New York, he tries to kill their pet cat.

The novel presents the increasingly stark contrasts between the life Edith records in her diary and her daily reality. In the diary, she details an imaginary life in which both she and Cliffie achieve grand success and gratification; friendships are more easy-going and she enjoys grandchildren.

In 1965, Brett abandons Edith for a younger woman. She is left living with an alcoholic, delinquent Cliffie and her husband's senile uncle, George. Even as she retreats into her diary and recasts her personal life, she remains always aware of the tangible world's social injustices. Having always been a woman of liberal political views, she notably maintains a sharp critique of U.S. involvement in Vietnam.

As years pass, friends and acquaintances become extremely concerned about Edith's psychological well-being. Her ex-husband sets about forcing her to see a psychiatrist. When Edith's family doctor brings a psychiatrist friend of his to her home, she is overtaken by fear and paranoia surrounding the possibility of others getting their hands on her diary. After she rushes to conceal it, she dies accidentally. Alone in the house, Cliffie ponders his own worries about someone inspecting the diary.

== Reception ==
The New Yorker called this novel "her strongest, her most imaginative, and by far her most substantial".

In The New York Times, Jane Larkin Crane wrote: "Edith's Diary takes the form of an old-fashioned psychological chiller, but there is also something stronger, the poignancy of her struggle not to go under. She is betrayed by such ordinary dreams."

Edith's Diary has been described as "one of [Highsmith's] bleakest" novels, that "presents a narrative of a woman's life that offers no redemptive possibilities and is portrayed instead as a slow but unremitting descent into madness".

== Adaptation ==
Edith's Diary was adapted into the German film Edith's Diary (1983), directed by Hans W. Geißendörfer and starring Angela Winkler as Edith. Highsmith called the film "dreadful" and said: "Making the son in love with the mother is a lot of Oedipal crap."
