= Christophe Malavoy =

French actor

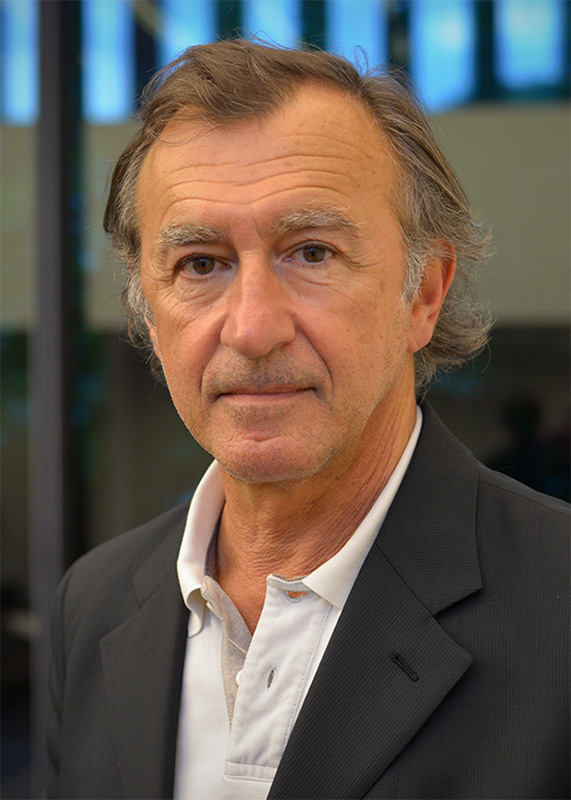
Christophe Malavoy, 2015

Christophe Malavoy (French: [kʁistɔf malavwa]; born 21 March 1952 in Reutlingen, West Germany), is a French actor.

== Selected filmography ==
Year	Title	Role	Director	Notes
1979	Heroes Are Not Wet Behind the Ears	The Driver	Charles Nemes	
1980	Le Voyage en douce	L'homme du train	Michel Deville	
1982	La Balance	Tintin	Bob Swaim	
1982	A Captain's Honor	Automarchi	Pierre Schoendoerffer	
1984	Souvenirs, Souvenirs	Rego Boccara / John B. Cutton	Ariel Zeitoun	
1985	Death in a French Garden	David Aurphet	Michel Deville	
1985	Bras de fer	Pierre Wagnies	Gérard Vergez	
1986	The Woman of My Life	Simon	Régis Wargnier	
1987	Association of Wrongdoers	Gérard	Claude Zidi	
1987	The Cry of the Owl	Robert	Claude Chabrol	
1990	The Amusements of Private Life	Honoré de Dumont	Cristina Comencini	
1991	Madame Bovary	Rodolphe Boulanger	Claude Chabrol	
1997	Love, Math and Sex	Sabine's father	Charlotte Silvera	
1998	The Cloud	Cholo	Fernando Solanas	
2004	The Last Day	Jean-Louis	Rodolphe Marconi	
