= Small g: a Summer Idyll =

Novel by Patricia Highsmith

- First edition
- Author: Patricia Highsmith
- Language: English
- Genre: Fiction
- Set in: Zurich
- Published: 1995 by Bloomsbury Publishing
- Publication place: United Kingdom
- Media type: Print
- Pages: 263 pp
- ISBN: 978-0-7475-2001-6
- OCLC: 32375183
- Dewey Decimal: 813.54
- LC Class: PS3558.I366

Small g: a Summer Idyll (1995) is the final novel by American writer Patricia Highsmith. It was published in the United Kingdom by Bloomsbury a month after her death, after first being rejected by Knopf, her usual publisher, months earlier. It was published in the United States by W. W. Norton in 2004.

== Plot ==
The "Small g" is the nickname given to Jakob's Bierstube-Restaurant, a seedy neighborhood bar in Zurich's Aussersihl district, referring to its categorization in local guidebooks as a gathering place for homosexual people on weekend evenings. The principal characters are 46-year-old gay Rickie Markwalder, who lives and works nearby as a graphic designer; 19-year-old Luisa Zimmermann, an apprentice seamstress; Teddie Stevenson, a young aspiring journalist whom both Rickie and Luisa find attractive; Dorrie, an attractive lesbian drawn to Luisa; Freddie Schimmelmann, a married police officer interested in Rickie; and Renate Hagnauer, a club-footed older woman who owns the nearby design shop where Luisa is apprenticed. Renate's shop is also her home, and Luisa boards there.

Renate spreads stories about Rickie to blacken his name. She tries to control Luisa's social life in every detail, even limiting her use of the telephone and locking her out of the apartment if she comes home late. A variety of minor characters of every sexual orientation, habituées of Jakob's or weekend visitors, form a loose social network in which Luisa becomes more and more engaged, exploring her attraction to Teddie and Dorrie in turn, while Renate's homophobia and anger at Luisa's attempts at independence become increasingly strident. Luisa is under legal obligation to Renate as an apprentice and relies on a good recommendation from her for future employment. Her friends contrive to free Luisa of her obligations to Renate.

== Depiction of HIV status ==
The subject of HIV testing appears in the novel, though it plays no significant role in either the plot or character development. Rickie has been diagnosed as HIV-positive. When informed of this, Freddie says he is HIV-positive as well. When Rickie's doctor informs him that he lied about Rickie's HIV test results to make him practice safe sex, Rickie reports this to Freddie, who announces his HIV negative as well. He had only misrepresented his HIV status to eliminate Rickie's fear of spreading HIV as a reason for refusing Freddie sex. According to Andrew Wilson, one of Highsmith's biographers, the false diagnosis is based in part on the experience of one of Highsmith's friends, though he nevertheless finds that in the novel it "strikes an unconvincing note".

== Critical reception ==
Writing in The New York Times, David Leavitt noted the novel's "superabundance of characters" give it "its air of Shakespearean complexity". Instead of the violent crime one expects from Highsmith, he wrote, Small g presents "a comedy of shifting, unstable identities to which the dramas of sexual uncertainty at its heart add a 90's edge". More typical is Highsmith's treatment of the novel's villain: "the scenes in which Renate rages at Luisa, or subjects her to increasingly bizarre domestic humiliations, are among the novel's best, fueled by Highsmith's perennial fascination with the erotics of submission and degradation." Leavitt nevertheless found the passivity of the central character, Rickie, "derails the narrative", and he complained of "pointless subplots" and "pedestrian prose". "In Rickie's world", wrote Louise Welsh in The Washington Post, "Cupid's arrows take mischievous aim and land with no concern for gender or convenience." She thought the novel had "a compelling narrative but is lacking in character development and literary style" and "reads like an exceedingly good first draft ... perhaps an essentially unfinished work".
