= Found in the Street =

1986 novel by Patricia Highsmith

- First edition (UK)
- Author: Patricia Highsmith
- Language: English
- Genre: Fiction
- Set in: New York City
- Published: Heinemann (UK); Atlantic Monthly Press US
- Publication date: 1986 (UK); 1987 (US)
- Publication place: United Kingdom
- Media type: Print
- Pages: 276 pp
- ISBN: 978-0-4343-3524-4
- OCLC: 13990292
- Dewey Decimal: 813.54
- LC Class: PS3558.I366

Found in the Street (1986) is the twentieth novel by the American expatriate writer Patricia Highsmith, the nineteenth published under her own name. It was published in the UK in April 1986 and in the US in 1987.

== Conception ==
Highsmith returned briefly from Europe to spend a few days researching the book's New York setting and walking the streets of the West Village. She explained: "I went to see what the bars are like now, for the geography, not the people; I had the people in my head." Her parents lived on Grove Street and she lived for a summer as a teenager on Morton Street, which both figure prominently in the novel.

According to one of Highsmith's biographers, Penzler Books had the novel set in type when Highsmith denied Otto Penzler the US publishing rights.

== Plot ==
Jack Sutherland, a 30-year-old graphic artist, lives in Greenwich Village with his wife Natalia and their daughter. They are well off and enjoy a wide social network. Ralph Linderman, middle-aged, long divorced, and a loner, self-righteous and judgmental, lives nearby and works odd hours as a security guard. Their worlds intersect briefly when Ralph finds Jack's wallet in the street and returns it in person.

A second intersection develops more slowly, at first without direct contact. Jack chats with a coffee shop waitress, Elsie Tyler, a pretty 20-year-old blond from a small town in upstate New York. Ralph has already noticed Elsie in the neighborhood and made a nuisance of himself warning her about the dangers of life in the city, the wrong friends who will introduce her to drugs, casual sex, and prostitution. Jack notices how Elsie waves off Ralph's counsel, and Ralph views Jack's friendship with Elsie as immoral behavior that is destroying her innocence. He sees, repeatedly yet almost accidentally as he walks his dog, Jack and Elsie (and sometimes Natalia or another female friend) coming or going from the Sutherlands' apartment at all hours, interprets their interactions in the most negative light, and writes Jack letters warning him against corrupting Elsie.

The Sutherlands both draw Elsie into their circle of friends, get her invited to adult parties, and help launch her career as a fashion photography model. Elsie is exploring her sexuality and has a series of relationships with women, including Natalia. Ralph tries to monitor Elsie's social life by tracking her movements when she changes apartments, but he misinterprets most of what he sees.

Elsie is murdered in the vestibule of her apartment. Ralph and Jack suspect each other of the murder. However, the real culprit turns out to be Fran, the girlfriend of one of Elsie's former girlfriends, who murdered her on a whim. Natalia, Jack, and Ralph all grieve for Elsie; the novel closes with Ralph and Jack both separately thinking they have seen Elsie on the street.

== Critical reception ==
In his New York Times review, John Gross described the novel as "a characteristic drama of interlocking destinies and insidious obsessions" in which "Miss Highsmith has added another memorable portrait to her gallery of near-pathological loners." He called it "not quite as powerful as the very best of Miss Highsmith's other novels" yet "in some respects more humane" in balancing a set of comfortably positioned and socially fulfilled New Yorkers against one menacing psychological figure. He praised the development and integration of minor characters and subplots that "unfold as compellingly as the central drama". In the London Review of Books, Christopher Ricks praised the way Highsmith as a novelist straddles the borders of the crime genre and the "studies of alienation" of the best literature, as she places the character of Elsie "dead-set for success, garish and enslaved, in the world of glossy modelling and of lip-service to art, an underworld of unreality which comes on as the overworld". Terrence Rafferty, praising the novel at length in The New Yorker, considered the same question of genre and called Found in the Street "fiction too abandoned to care what it's called, literature or trash, that celebrates restlessness and volatility". He called it a "thriller' with "no thriller writer's gamesmanship ... none of the reassuring trickery of professional pulp; Highsmith's style is as blunt and straightforward as a strip-search". He writes:

Patricia Highsmith is no mean tease herself. She keeps us off guard, never quite sure what she's up to or why, the hard surface of her prose encouraging us to find our own reflections in it.... The cold, no-attitude gaze that comes back at us is strangely exciting;: it works on us like both the blank interrogative stare of the psychoanalyst, offering us the liberating opportunity to articulate our most shameful desires, and the you-can't-have-me indifference of pornography, urging us to indulge ourselves when no one's looking. Her thrillers take us into ourselves, no out of ourselves, and lead us to pleasures we hate to admit to–the kind of sneaky, self-abusive enjoyment that hypochondriacs find in poring over medical textbooks.... Highsmith's books are the queasiest fun imaginable.

The Los Angeles Times enjoyed how the novel catches "the taste and texture of life in Manhattan ... [f]rom the exhilaration of discovering a previously overlooked Greek take-out restaurant to the feel of jogging through the empty, early-morning streets". Fiona Peters, in her study of Highsmith's writing, deems the violent act near the novels' close as "curiously out of place", but typical of the author's need to freeze her heroine in an ideal state, "surface without substantiality", rather than explore the life that awaits her in a world antagonistic to women.

Like all of her work, Found in the Street proved more successful in Europe than in the US. Some 40,000 copies sold in Germany, just 4,000 in the US. In 2003, John Malkovich said he was working on a screen adaptation of the novel.
