= The Cry of the Owl (2009 film) =

- DVD cover
- Directed by: Jamie Thraves
- Screenplay by: Jamie Thraves
- Based on: The Cry of the Owl by Patricia Highsmith
- Produced by: Antoine de Clermont-Tonnerre; Malte Grunert; Jennifer Kawaja; Julia Sereny; Sytze van der Laan
- Starring: Paddy Considine; Julia Stiles; Karl Pruner; James Gilbert
- Cinematography: Luc Montpellier
- Edited by: David Charap
- Music by: Jeff Danna
- Production company: BBC Films
- Distributed by: Myriad Pictures
- Release dates: June 22, 2009 (Germany); August 19, 2009 (France); March 12, 2010 (United States); April 19, 2010 (United Kingdom); May 21, 2010 (Canada)
- Running time: 100 minutes
- Countries: United States; United Kingdom; Canada; France; Germany
- Language: English

The Cry of the Owl is a 2009 thriller film based on Patricia Highsmith's 1962 book of the same name, and was directed by Jamie Thraves. It stars Paddy Considine, Julia Stiles, and Karl Pruner. This is the third filming of the book after the 1987 French film adaptation by Claude Chabrol and a German television adaptation titled Der Schrei der Eule also from 1987. After Robert Forrester is caught by Jenny Thierolf, the girl he has been spying on, he becomes the victim of her manipulative advances. The disappearance of Jenny's fiancé Greg after a fight with Robert marks the beginning of a series of dangerous and ultimately fatal incidents.

== Plot ==
Robert Forrester is going through a painful divorce from his wife Nickie. He begins spying on Jenny Thierolf, a girl living in the countryside, because to him she represents a state of harmony, a stark contrast to his own personal life. Jenny catches him one night, but instead of being upset, she invites him in and they talk.

Jenny ends her relationship with her fiancé Greg, believing her chance meeting with Robert was an act of fate. Jenny's friends, who are still sympathetic towards Greg, disapprove of her choice. Jenny starts stalking Robert: She waits for him outside of his office, calls him late at night, and tries to sleep over at his house. He resists her advances and tells her that he has received a promotion at work and will be moving away to Philadelphia, making any relationship between them impossible. Jenny offers to come with him to Philadelphia, but he declines.

Later, when Robert is driving home on a lonely country road, Greg stops his car and attacks him. Though hurt by the younger and stronger Greg, Robert manages to knock Greg unconscious and into a river. He drags Greg out of the river and leaves him on the bank, Greg obviously alive as his breath is hard. Shortly thereafter, the police question Robert because Greg is missing. He admits that they fought and that he left the unconscious Greg near the river. The police speculate that Greg might be dead (though they have no body), either by accident or because Robert killed him. When Robert's employer learns he is a police suspect, he loses the promotion in Philadelphia and is suspended. Also, a colleague and former friend dissociates himself from Robert. He is attacked by Greg's father, who thinks Robert murdered his son.

Drifting and aimless, Robert continues his uneasy relationship with Jenny, who has become convinced that he may have a bad omen over him (represented by the owl of the title, which is a common symbol of coming death). Jenny goes to visit Robert's ex-wife Nickie, who says she left him because he seemed like bad luck. A corpse is found in the river, and although it is in such a bad state that it is almost unidentifiable, the police believe it to be Greg's. Jenny then commits suicide, leaving a note that she and Robert had met after he stalked Jenny.

Robert is befriended by the widower who lives next door to him. One night, Greg appears outside of the widower's house and fires a gun, seriously wounding the widower but only clipping Robert. The police place Robert in protective custody, and Greg threatens him again. Soon after, Robert is informed that Greg has been picked up by the police, and that it was Nickie who paid Greg to pretend to be dead to get him in trouble.

When Robert drives to Jenny's house, he is met by Nickie and Greg. Nickie tries to persuade Robert to tell the police that she had nothing to do with setting him up, and warns him of an enraged and drunken Greg. Making matters worse, Greg's father calls to tell him that the widower he shot has died, making Greg a murderer. Greg attacks Robert with a knife; in the subsequent fight, Greg is knocked unconscious, but Nickie is fatally injured. Robert is again left as a suspect in an apparent crime scene. The final shot shows Robert looking out Jenny's window, reminiscent of his view on the house in the opening shots.

== Cast ==
- Paddy Considine as Robert Forrester
- Julia Stiles as Jenny Thierolf
- Karl Pruner as Mr. Jaffe
- James Gilbert as Greg Wyncoop
- Phillip MacKenzie as Lavigne Client
- Gord Rand as Jack Neilson
- Caroline Dhavernas as Nickie Grace
- R. D. Reid as Mr. Kolbe
- Alex Karzis as Robert's Lawyer
- Marcia Laskowski as Nickie's Lawyer
- Krista Bridges as Elaine
- Nicholas Campbell as Jed Wyncoop
- Charlotte Sullivan as Sally Neilson
- Robbie Campbell as Walt Nelson
- Jennifer Kydd as Susie Escham
- Dru Viergever as Bill
- Peter MacNeill as Sam Rhodes
- Brian Bisson as Police Officer
- Jimmy Byron as Police Officer
- Jonah Allison as Police Officer
- Arnold Pinnock as Detective Anderson
- Bruce McFee as Detective Lippenholtz
- Chris Gillett as Mr. Thierolf
- Maria Ricosa as Mrs. Thierolf
- Sarah Podemski as Nurse

== Film and book ==
Although being quite faithful to the novel, the film changes some details, including the dropping and adding of secondary characters. In the book, Nickie conspires against Robert (and has an affair) with Greg, although she is freshly re-married to the bland Ralph Jurgen. It is Ralph who informs Robert that Greg is actually alive and hiding (Robert then calls the police), while in the film Robert finds out at the police station. The final confrontation between Robert, Nickie and Greg takes place in Robert's flat, not in Jenny's house. Also, the distinctive use of the Louis Armstrong song A Kiss to Build a Dream On is the film's invention.

According to Patricia Highsmith's former partner Marijane Meaker, the character of Nickie was modeled after Meaker as a "retaliation".

== Production and release ==
The film is a co-production between BBC Films (UK), MACT Productions (France), Myriad Pictures (America), Sienna Films (Canada), Studio Hamburg International Production (SHIP), The Harold Greenberg Fund. It was shot in Ontario, Canada, between October and December 2007.

The film was released in the UK October 9, 2009.

It premiered on DVD and Blu-ray Disc in most countries, with Canada and France being among the few exceptions. It was released in the UK on April 19, 2010, and in the US on June 8, 2010.

== Reception ==
On Rotten Tomatoes, it has a 13% approval rating based on 8 reviews, with an average score of 3.9/10.

Due to its limited release, reviews of The Cry of the Owl were sparse, and mostly reserved:

- "British writer-director Jamie Thraves, who hails from music videos, works up a crisp, elegantly foreboding visual bleakness […] but, overall, it's the kind of technically proficient, deliberately paced, grim sleepwalk that leaves one cold rather than cracked open." – Robert Abele, Los Angeles Times
- "A far cry from suspenseful […] director Jamie Thraves, who wrote the screenplay, fails to draw out the novel's many intriguing elements." – Bruce DeMara, Toronto Star
- "Well-acted, moody psychological thriller whose latent suspense relies on the ambiguity of its characters." – Lexikon des Internationalen Films
