= Little Tales of Misogyny =

1975 anthology of short stories by Patricia Highsmith

First edition (Swiss)

Little Tales of Misogyny (1975), German: Kleine Geschichten für Weiberfeinde, is an anthology of short stories by Patricia Highsmith, first published in German language in Switzerland by Diogenes Verlag, with illustrations by Roland Topor. (Note: ISBN 978-3257203493 / ISBN 3257203497) It was published in English by Heinemann in 1977. (Note: ISBN 978-0434335176 / ISBN 0434335177)

The 'tales' are notable for their brevity — some comprise only a couple of pages — and macabre, exceedingly downbeat, satirical tone. The underlying theme of each story is the misfortune of women and/or men who destroy themselves or the lives of others, hence the book's title. Each story satirises a specific misogynist stereotype, like the woman who manipulates men with her sexuality in "The Coquette", or one who is viewed solely as a sexual commodity, in "The Mobile Bed-Object".

== Contents ==
- "The Hand"
- "Oona, the Jolly Cave Woman"
- "The Coquette"
- "The Female Novelist"
- "The Dancer"
- "The Invalid, or, the Bedridden"
- "The Artist"
- "The Middle-Class Housewife"
- "The Fully Licensed Whore, or, the Wife"
- "The Breeder"
- "The Mobile-Bed Object"
- "The Perfect Little Lady"
- "The Silent Mother-in-Law"
- "The Prude"
- "The Victim"
- "The Evangelist"
- "The Perfectionist"

== Reception ==
- The 17 tales in Highsmith's new collection are a far cry from Strangers on a Train and her other unforgettable thrillers. These stories, although written with exemplary style, make the flesh crawl but not pleasurably, as reliable suspense fare does...From the book's overall tone, readers could infer that its origin was bitter contempt for humans of either gender. The entries fail as real satire, which is always amusing, regardless of its stings. – Publishers Weekly
- The great revival of interest in Patricia Highsmith continues with the publication of this legendary, cultish short story collection. With an eerie simplicity of style, Highsmith turns our next-door neighbors into sadistic psychopaths, lying in wait among white picket fences and manicured lawns. In the darkly satiric, often mordantly hilarious sketches that make up Little Tales of Misogyny, Highsmith upsets our conventional notions of female character, revealing the devastating power of these once familiar creatures — "The Dancer," "The Female Novelist," "The Prude" — who destroy both themselves and the men around them. This work attests to Highsmith's reputation as "the poet of apprehension" (Graham Greene). –
