= Those Who Walk Away =

1967 novel by Patricia Highsmith

- First edition
- Author: Patricia Highsmith
- Language: English
- Genre: Fiction
- Set in: Italy
- Published: Doubleday & Co.
- Publication date: 1967
- Media type: Print
- Pages: 229
- OCLC: 969333
- LC Class: PS3558.I366

Those Who Walk Away (1967) is a psychological thriller novel by Patricia Highsmith. It was the twelfth of her 22 novels.

== Synopsis ==
When Ray Garrett's new wife kills herself on their honeymoon, he persuades the initially suspicious Rome police that he's innocent of any wrongdoing over the death. However, his father-in-law, the brutish Ed Coleman, is convinced Ray led to her death and shoots Ray, leaving him for dead. He survives and, desperate to prove himself, follows Coleman to Venice, the husband and father bound together by love and guilt, with Coleman still seeking justice and Garrett a clear conscience.

== Reviews ==
It has been called Highsmith's "masterpiece".
