= The Glass Cell (film) =

- Directed by: Hans W. Geißendörfer
- Screenplay by: Klaus Bädekerl; Hans W. Geißendörfer
- Based on: The Glass Cell by Patricia Highsmith
- Produced by: Bernd Eichinger; Luggi Waldleitner
- Starring: Brigitte Fossey; Helmut Griem; Dieter Laser
- Cinematography: Robby Müller
- Edited by: Peter Przygodda
- Music by: Niels Janette Walen
- Production companies: Bayerischer Rundfunk; Roxy Film; Solaris Film
- Distributed by: Filmverlag der Autoren
- Release date: 6 April 1978
- Running time: 93 minutes
- Country: West Germany
- Language: German

The Glass Cell (German: Die gläserne Zelle) is a 1978 West German crime film directed by Hans W. Geißendörfer and starring Brigitte Fossey, Helmut Griem, and Dieter Laser. It is based on the 1964 novel of the same name by Patricia Highsmith. It was nominated for the Academy Award for Best Foreign Language Film at the 51st Academy Awards.

It was shot at the Bavaria Studios and on location around Munich and Frankfurt. The film's sets were designed by art director Heidi Lüdi.

== Plot ==
The film tells the story of architect Phillip Braun, who is released from prison after serving five years. He was convicted for a fatal accident at a construction site, though in reality, the responsibility lay with the developer Lasky. Upon his release, Phillip attempts to reintegrate into his former life. However, during his absence, his wife has grown distant, as has his now 11-year-old son, who has become a stranger to him. Phillip suspects his wife of infidelity with his lawyer and best friend David during his incarceration. When Lasky exacerbates these suspicions, Phillip snaps: he murders David, with Lasky as a witness. As Lasky begins to blackmail him, Phillip feels increasingly cornered and searches for a way out.

== Cast ==
- Brigitte Fossey as Lisa Braun
- Helmut Griem as Phillip Braun
- Dieter Laser as David Reinelt
- Walter Kohut as Robert Lasky
- Claudius Kracht as Timmie Braun
- Günter Strack as Direktor Goller
- Hans-Günter Martens as Prosecutor
- Edith Volkmann as Nachbarin
- Bernhard Wicki as Kommissar Österreicher
- Martin Flörchinger

== See also ==
- List of submissions to the 51st Academy Awards for Best Foreign Language Film
- List of German submissions for the Academy Award for Best Foreign Language Film
