= Jamie Thraves =

British film writer and director

- Born: James Thraves
- Occupations: Film writer and director
- Years active: 1989–present

James Thraves is a British film writer and director. He is known for many music videos and the feature film Treacle Jr. (2010), starring Aidan Gillen.

== Early life and education ==
Thraves began making early short experimental films in 1989 at the University of Humberside, having previously studied illustration. His graduation film Scratch (1991) and The Take-Out (1993), a short film made under the BFI New Directors scheme, both went on to win awards at film festivals worldwide.

He joined the Royal College of Art in 1993 where he made another award-winning film, The Hackney Downs (1995).

== Career ==
After leaving the Royal College of Art he joined Oil Factory, a music video company, making his breakthrough video in 1995 for Radiohead for their song "Just" where a man is lying on the pavement and is confronted by an angry crowd, while Dorian Lough portrays the initial and main passerby who begins to question him after tripping over the man, this video garnered Thraves a lot of attention for its strong narrative structure and use of subtitles, what the man says to make the crowd lie down at the end of the video still continues to cause discussion amongst fans today. Thraves has made music videos for many artists over the years including Blur, The Verve, Radiohead, and Coldplay and more recently Jake Bugg, Sam Smith and Villagers. His video for Coldplay's "The Scientist" won three Moon Men at the 2003 MTV Video Music Awards in the US, including Best Direction and Breakthrough Video.

Thraves directed the short film I Just Want To Kiss You in 1997, starring Martin Freeman, which won the Fox Searchlight Award for Best Short Film at the Edinburgh International Film Festival in 1998.

Thraves made his first feature, The Low Down (2000), with Film 4. It starred Aidan Gillen, Kate Ashfield, Tobias Menzies, Dean Lennox Kelly, Adam Buxton and Joe Cornish. The film was named among the "neglected masterpieces" of film history by The Observer in its rundown of 50 Lost Movie Classics.

His second feature, The Cry of the Owl (2009), an international co-production with BBC Films, starred Paddy Considine and Julia Stiles. It was based on the novel of the same name by Patricia Highsmith.

His third feature film, Treacle Jr. (2010), reunited him with Aidan Gillen. At the film's world premiere at the 21st Dinard British Film Festival it won the Hitchcock D'Or - Grand Jury Prize. Treacle Jr. had its UK Premiere at the 54th BFI London Film Festival. Time Out said of Treacle Jr. "Funny, touching and gritty, this coolly rendered observation on need and rejection really is a Brit drama to shout about".

Thraves' fourth feature film, Pickups (2017), is the third to star long-term collaborator Aidan Gillen, who co-wrote the script.

== Music videos ==
1995

- "Just" - Radiohead
- "Toes Across the Floor" - Blind Melon

1996

- "Charmless Man" - Blur
- "Woman" - Neneh Cherry

1997

- "All I Want to Do Is Rock" - Travis
- "Lucky Man (US Version)" - The Verve

1998

- "Temper, Temper" - Goldie
- "Being a Girl" - Mansun
- "Negative" - Mansun

2000

- "Catch the Sun" - Doves (Version 1 - Unaired).

2001

- "So Why So Sad" - Manic Street Preachers

2002

- "Sound of Sounds" - Gomez
- "The Scientist" - Coldplay

2003

- "God Put a Smile upon Your Face" - Coldplay

2005

- "Love Steals Us from Loneliness" - Idlewild
- "Somewhere Else" - Razorlight
- "Half Light" - Athlete
- "I Understand It" - Idlewild

2006

- "I Will Follow You into the Dark" - Death Cab for Cutie
- "Anna Molly" - Incubus
- "9 Crimes" - Damien Rice

2007

- "Overpowered" - Róisín Murphy

2008

- "Daddy's Gone" - Glasvegas

2009

- "Fire Escape" - Fanfarlo

2010

- "I'd Do It All Again" - Corinne Bailey Rae
- "Dirtee Disco" - Dizzee Rascal

2012

- "Two Fingers" - Jake Bugg

2013

- "Another Love" - Tom Odell

2014

- "Money on My Mind" - Sam Smith
- "Stay with Me" - Sam Smith
- "Hold On" - Twin Atlantic

2015

- "Everything I Am Is Yours" - Villagers

2017

- "Sweat" - The All-American Rejects

2020

- "Call Me" - Gabrielle Aplin

== Filmography ==
- The Low Down (2000)
- The Cry of the Owl (2009)
- Treacle Jr. (2010)
- Pickups (2017)
