= The Tremor of Forgery =

1969 novel by Patricia Highsmith

- First edition
- Author: Patricia Highsmith
- Language: English
- Genre: Fiction
- Set in: Tunisia
- Published: Doubleday & Co.
- Publication date: 1969
- Media type: Print

The Tremor of Forgery (1969) is a psychological thriller novel by Patricia Highsmith. It was the thirteenth of her 22 novels.

== Synopsis ==
American writer Howard Ingham arrives in the sweltering heat of Tunisia in search of inspiration for a new movie script he has been commissioned to write. The director with whom he is collaborating fails to appear and hears reports from home in the U.S. about infidelity and suicide. Rather than abandon the project, Howard stays and starts work on a novel. He gets to know Francis J. Adams, an aging American propagandist, and Anders Jensen, a Danish homosexual painter. While waiting for a letter from his New York girlfriend, he settled on a plot for his projected novel, the story of a banker who forges documents to steal money he then gives to the poor. One night, Ingham finds someone breaking into his apartment. He throws his typewriter at the intruder, possibly killing him. The body is dragged away by the intruder's accomplices. Ingham struggles to keep this incident secret from his acquaintances while at the same time questioning Western morality, in particular the application of its principles in a country where he lives as a stranger.

== Themes ==
Like many of Highsmith's other novels, The Tremor of Forgery is ultimately a morality tale. Highsmith reveals that like most people, the novel's protagonist Ingham sees himself as ultimately a good person who cares about the welfare of people and loves his fiancé. However, as the novel progresses, Ingham's actions reveal that human morality is more often dictated by circumstances, and that self-interest and preservation is humanity's underlying ethos. Human emotions that drive our behavior, such as love, are by the end of the novel, portrayed as artificial constructs of society, rather than emotions that are deeply felt. This is confusing to Ingham, as he laments that the world, including his own feelings, are incomprehensible to him.

== Reception ==
"Highsmith has produced work as serious in its implications and as subtle in its approach as anything being done in the novel today." - Julian Symons

"Miss Highsmith's finest novel to my mind is The Tremor of Forgery, and if I were to be asked what it is about I would reply, 'Apprehension'." - Graham Greene
