= The Glass Cell (novel) =

1964 novel by Patricia Highsmith

- First edition
- Author: Patricia Highsmith
- Language: English
- Genre: Fiction
- Set in: United States
- Published: Doubleday & Co. (US, 1964); Heinemann (UK, 1965)
- Media type: Print
- Pages: 213
- OCLC: 1378820

The Glass Cell (1964) is a psychological thriller novel by Patricia Highsmith. It was the tenth of her 22 novels. It addresses the psychological and physical impact of wrongful imprisonment. It appeared in both the UK and the US in 1964. When first published, the book jacket carried a warning that its opening scene is "almost unacceptable".

It was republished by W.W. Norton & Company in 2004 and by Virago in 2014.

== Composition ==
Highsmith received a fan letter in 1961 from a prison inmate who had enjoyed her novel Deep Water (1957). They exchanged several letters and she used him for research, requesting detail of daily life in prison. She then came across a journalist's account of an innocent man's prison experiences that provided her with more material. She also relied on John Bartlow Martin's account of the 1952 riots in the Michigan State Prison, Break Down the Walls (1954). She used his detailed description of solitary confinement and adopted his thorough critique of imprisonment in the United States. She began work on the novel in September 1962. Her working title was The Prisoner. She visited a prison near her Pennsylvania home in December, though she could only see from the reception area. She wrote much of the novel in Positano in 1963. Her editor at Harper & Brothers rejected the manuscript and requested major changes, especially to establish Carter's character before his imprisonment. Highsmith found herself blocked for a time until the acceptance of other manuscripts (The Two Faces of January by Doubleday in the US and a short story by Ellery Queen's Mystery Magazine) restored her confidence. She reworked the manuscript and placed it with Doubleday and Heinemann in the spring of 1964. Highsmith dedicated the novel to her cat Spider.

Highsmith devoted a chapter of her non-fiction Plotting and Writing Suspense Fiction (1966) to The Glass Cell as "The Case History of a Novel".

== Plot ==
The novel opens with a graphic scene of prison violence in which guards string a prisoner up by his thumbs. This sadistic torture leaves the man with permanent damage; in prison he manages the pain with doctor-administered morphine injections. The prisoner is Philip Carter, a sweet-natured and naïve young engineer who has been sentenced to ten years for fraud, though he is actually innocent. After the only close friend he makes in prison is killed in a riot, Carter becomes protractedly depressed, less concerned with conscience, and more easily violent. He harbors the idea that his wife, Hazel, is having an affair with a lawyer, David, who is supposedly working to obtain a pardon for Carter. After six years, Carter is released. David helps him gain employment but, in due course, the affair is admitted and ongoing. Carter's character and personality have been so transformed by his incarceration that, when he is driven to confront those who have betrayed him, as well as those responsible for framing him, there are deadly consequences.

== Reception ==
Highsmith employs strong overtones of Russian writers including Fyodor Dostoevsky, and the work was immensely well received by critics from across the spectrum.

Writing in The Guardian, Rachel Cooke called The Glass Cell Highsmith's "masterwork: Crime and Punishment without any hard labour on the part of the reader".

== Adaptations ==
The novel was adapted as a German-language film of the same name (Die gläserne Zelle). It was nominated for the Academy Award for Best Foreign Language Film in 1978. Highsmith thought well of the film, which only increased her dismay when the same director, Hans Geissendorfer, made changes she thought "dreadful" when adapting her novel Edith's Diary.
