= A Dog's Ransom =

1972 novel by Patricia Highsmith

- First edition
- Author: Patricia Highsmith
- Language: English
- Genre: Psychological thriller
- Published: 1972 (Knopf)
- Publication place: United States
- Pages: 271
- ISBN: 978-0-394-48069-5
- OCLC: 19866298
- Dewey Decimal: 813.54
- LC Class: PS3558.I366

A Dog's Ransom (1972) is a psychological thriller novel by Patricia Highsmith.

== Synopsis ==
Publishing executive Ed Reynolds finds a disturbing ransom note in the Manhattan apartment he shares with his wife: "Dear sir: I have your dog, Lisa. She is well and happy... I gather she is important to you? We'll see." They pay the ransom and the criminal is apprehended. Only then do events swirl out of control, leading to the downfall of several innocent characters and the triumph of evil.

== Reception ==
An anonymous reviewer in The New York Times wrote: "Evil, the author tells us, is a force against which ordinary people are all but helpless; its psychopathology lies outside their life styles." He praised Highsmith's writing: "Without overwriting, without belaboring a point, she skillfully probes deeper and deeper. She has a good ear for dialogue, and the ability to underline character with only a few words, or the briefest snatch of conversation."

== Television adaptation ==
John Griffith Bowen dramatized the novel for Thames Television in 1978 for their anthology series Armchair Thriller, moving the action from New York to London.
