= A Game for the Living =

1958 novel by Patricia Highsmith

- First edition
- Author: Patricia Highsmith
- Language: English
- Set in: Mexico
- Published: Harper & Brothers (1958)
- Media type: Print

A Game for the Living (1958) is a psychological thriller novel by Patricia Highsmith. It is the sixth of her 22 novels and the only one set in Mexico.

== Composition ==
The novel is dedicated to one of Highsmith's college teachers, Ethel Sturtevant, "my friend and teacher", along with Dorothy Hargreaves and Mary McCurdy.

== Synopsis ==
Ramon, a devoutly Catholic furniture repairman in Mexico City meets Theo, a wealthy German atheist expatriate who questions the happiness he had found in his new home: "Theodore thought he was as happy as anyone logically could be in an age when atomic bombs and annihilation hung over everybody's head, though the world 'logically' troubled him in this context. Could one be logically happy?" An unlikely friendship develops, until Lelia, a woman they have both slept with and care for, is found brutally raped, murdered and mutilated. Each suspects the other is responsible, and the police investigate them both as well. They learn that Lelia may have been robbed and track a suspect to Acapulco, but Theo believes he is under surveillance.

== Reception ==
Dorothy B. Hughes, a somewhat older author of crime fiction who did not care for Highsmith's writing in general, objected in private to Highsmith's "lack of empathy to the Mexican nationals" in this novel.

Highsmith herself had a negative opinion of her novel, regretting her attempt to write in the mystery genre. She later wrote:

I had tried to do something different from what I had been doing, but this caused me to leave out certain elements that are vital for me: surprise, speed of action, stretching the reader's credulity, and above all the intimacy with the murderer himself. I am not an inventor of puzzles, nor do I like secrets. The result, after rewriting the book four times in a gruelling year of work, was mediocrity. I always say to foreign publishers, and to publishers who contemplate a reprint, "This is my worst book, so please think twice before you buy it."
