= People Who Knock on the Door =

1983 novel by Patricia Highsmith

- First edition (UK)
- Author: Patricia Highsmith
- Language: English
- Genre: Fiction
- Set in: United States
- Published: Heinemann (UK); Penzler Books (US)
- Publication date: 1983 (UK); 1985 (US)
- Media type: Print
- Pages: 305
- ISBN: 0434335215
- OCLC: 716454050
- Dewey Decimal: 813/.54
- LC Class: 83152470

People Who Knock on the Door (1983) is a novel by Patricia Highsmith. It was the nineteenth of her 22 novels.

== Composition ==
Highsmith drew inspiration from the revival of fundamentalist Christianity that achieved notoriety in the late 1970s in the US with the prominence of Jerry Falwell and other televangelists and the organization of its political arm, the Moral Majority. She watched US television programs in search of details for depicting preachers and advocates of religious fundamentalism. She traveled from Europe for several weeks in 1981 to visit New York City, Indianapolis, and Bloomington and she returned to Bloomington the next year as well. She appears to have modeled the novel's Chalmerstown on Bloomington, a rather small town that is home to a large university.

She was unhappy that her final draft contained much more dialogue than is typical of her writing. Heinemann, her usual British publisher, brought the book out in 1983 to strong reviews. Her US editor, on the other hand, did not recommend it to Harper & Row, where he had recently moved from Lippincott. Highsmith commented: "I really don't care much if my books are published in the USA or not. I've never lost or changed a publisher because of my demanding a big advance, it's that the USA publishers do not take chances, there's no loyalty–and maybe not much loyalty among readers in the USA." Penzler Books, a small publishing house that specialized in crime and mysteries, published the novel in the US in 1985.

The title refers to the missionaries' standard method of evangelization, ringing doorbells to engage neighbors in conversation. In the course of the novel, a representative of the local church knocks unannounced on several occasions at the door of the Alderman or Brewster family.

The British edition carried the dedication:

To the courage of the Palestinian people and their leaders in the struggle to regain a part of their homeland. This book has nothing to do with their problem.

She would have known that the Christian fundamentalist community in the US was committed to unquestioned support for Israel. Anticipating negative publicity, Penzler dropped the dedication from the US edition without Highsmith's consent, though her Swiss publisher agreed. She later complained of this and said Penzler did so because he was a Jew, though he was not. Penzler produced a special edition of the novel and several of her short stories and brought Highsmith from Switzerland to New York to publicize them. After multiple instances of very rude behavior on Highsmith's part during the publicity tour, Penzler termed her "the most unloving and unlovable person I've ever known ... a really terrible human being."

== Plot ==
Arthur Alderman is in his senior year of high school in Chalmerstown, a small city in the Midwest. He expects to attend Columbia University in New York City. His hectoring and distant father, Richard, sells insurance and retirement finance packages. Lois, his mother, keeps house and volunteers regularly at the local orphanage. Robbie, his younger brother and only sibling, recovers from a medical emergency, and this inspires a new religiosity in Richard, who insists on church attendance by the entire family. Religious literature soon fills their home. Arthur has his first sexual experience with Maggie Brewster and learns a few weeks later that she is pregnant. With the support of her family, she has an abortion, as Richard tries and fails to persuade Arthur to intervene to stop it. A visitor from the church, Eddie Howell, makes the first of several intrusive visits to pressure Arthur as well. Arthur resists, defending Maggie's right to decide for herself; he draws on his passion for science to reinforce his feelings of how inferior he feels the 'religious' people are. The confrontation further transforms his relationship with his father: "Eddie Howell was a sick prig, Arthur thought, and so was his father to be sitting there with a solemn face, concentrating on this twit–fifteen or twenty years younger than his father–as if he were God himself or some kind of divine messenger."

Arthur is now persona non grata in his own family, weakly supported by his mother and visiting grandmother. For support he leans on an elderly woman neighbor, his friend Gus, and his employer for the summer at a local shoe store. He bonds with Maggie's mother. Without his father's financial support, he arranges to attend the much less expensive local university instead of Columbia. Robbie seems to adopt his father's moral principles, though he is otherwise socially odd, spending his free time fishing or hunting with a group of older men in a strange community of misfits. He becomes an increasingly dark and sullen presence; Richard appears not to notice, Lois voices some concerns which go nowhere. Arthur's relationship with Maggie's survives several months of separation while she is away at Radcliffe. When she and Arthur bolt the doors to ensure themselves some privacy in the Aldermen house, for a few hours during Christmas vacation, Robbie raises alarms and Richard orders Arthur to move out of the family home.

Richard has become increasingly involved in church activities and participates in outreach programs and counseling. He devotes exceptional amounts of time to Irene, a former prostitute who earns a meager income waitressing at a local truck stop. Irene becomes an ever more intrusive presence. Her pregnancy leads to a dramatic resolution of the Alderman family's conflicts.

== Reception ==
The New York Times reviewer noted that the subject was "something of a departure from her usual analysis of aberrant personalities" and "surprisingly dull" and "a bit of a yawn". She complained that Highsmith focused on a "sympathetic yet unexceptional youth" ill-suited to "her brilliant insights into criminal psychology" that might better have targeted his brother and father. The reviewer for The Tablet, a London-based Roman Catholic journal, wrote: "One of the annoying things about this cold story is that it forces one to take the wrong side, for Arthur and his mother are so nice in spite of their behaviour, while Richard and Robbie are so odious in their righteousness -- maybe because of it, the author seems to suggest." She praised "the atmosphere of small-town summer" but faulted the denouement: "It is some kind of solution, but not a comfortable one; Miss Highsmith can do much better than this callous if skilful story."
