= This Sweet Sickness =

1960 novel by Patricia Highsmith

- First edition
- Author: Patricia Highsmith
- Language: English
- Genre: Psychological Thriller, Horror
- Publisher: Harper & Brothers, US; Heinemann, UK
- Publication date: 1960
- Publication place: United States
- Media type: Print (Hardback & Paperback)
- Pages: 240 pp (hardback edition)
- OCLC: 310569021

This Sweet Sickness (1960) is a psychological thriller novel by Patricia Highsmith, about a man who is obsessed with a woman who has rejected his advances. It is a "painful novel about obsessive imaginary love".

== Composition ==
Highsmith dedicated the novel to her mother Mary: "To my mother".

== Synopsis ==
Scientist David Kelsey is infatuated with Annabelle, with whom he had a short relationship before moving away to take a job. David hopes the job will allow him to earn enough money to marry Annabelle. However, the two never actually discussed marriage and, while David is away, Annabelle marries another man named Gerald. Unable to accept the turn of events and move on, David begins laboring under the increasingly self-deluding hope that Annabelle will leave her new husband.

Under the assumed identity of William Neumeister, a freelance journalist who frequently travels, David buys a cabin in the country to serve as his eventual home with Annabelle. He furnishes the house to her liking and spends weekends there, performing household routines as if he is doing everything for two. David sends letters, visits Annabelle's home and asks her to divorce Gerald even after she has had a son by him.

Eventually, Gerald discovers David's house and arrives to confront the situation. The two men get into a scuffle which ends with Gerald falling and breaking his neck. David reports the death to the police, identifying himself as Neumeister and describing Gerald as a belligerent stranger who showed up at his door and, spoiling for a fight, was killed accidentally.

Two of David's friends, Wes Carmichael and Effie Brennan, once secretly followed him to the house and, after the death of Gerald, suspect him of a duality about which they question him over time and with escalating incisiveness. Effie, being in love with David and hoping he will ultimately give up on Annabelle, often supports him at key points during his attempts to maintain his two identities.

David builds a web of lies, betrayal and denial. Annabelle wants to meet Neumeister in order to learn more about the circumstances of her husband's death; David fends her off successfully. David secures a new job, sells his house, and buys a new one nearer to Annabelle under his own name. He repeats his intrusive behavior with her new beau, Grant.

One weekend, David, who is beginning to occasionally lose touch with reality, invites Wes and Effie to visit in his new home. After some heavy drinking and quarreling, their relationships deteriorate rapidly, followed by more violence and David on the lam in New York City. There, he fantasizes that Annabelle is with him as they sight-see, shop and dine. When, in a restaurant, he is recognized as a wanted man, he imagines the two of them are fleeing together, but David's time has run out.

== Reception ==
Writing in The New York Times, Anthony Boucher called the novel "an impressive psychological study". He wrote:

Objectively yet compassionately she examines a young chemist who spends his weekends in a make-believe in which that girl did not marry somebody else; and relentlessly she shows how his rejection of reality leads to disaster and death. The book has the compulsion of truth; and probably only a professional reviewer in a heavy season would protest that she might have got the same results in something under 100,000 words.

== Adaptations ==
This Sweet Sickness was adapted in 1962 for an episode of the anthology television series The Alfred Hitchcock Hour. The episode, titled "Annabel," starred Dean Stockwell as David Kelsey and Susan Oliver as Annabel. The novel was also the basis for the 1977 French-language film Dites-lui que je l'aime (Tell Her I Love Her), starring Gérard Depardieu as David, which Highsmith did not like.
