= Angela Winkler =

German actress (born 1944)

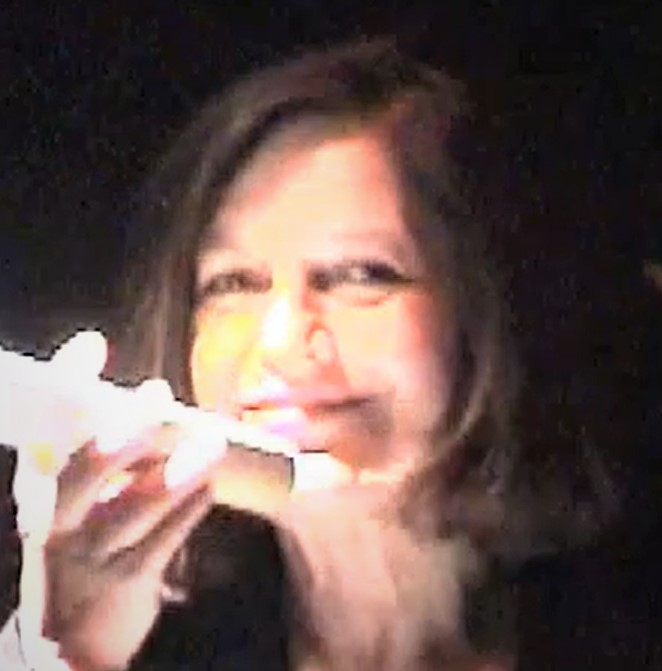
- Winkler in 2009
- Born: 22 January 1944 (age 82); Templin, Germany
- Occupation: Actress
- Years active: 1967–present
- Awards: German Film Award

Angela Winkler (born 22 January 1944) is a German actress.

== Life and career ==
Born in Templin, Winkler trained to be a medical technologist in Stuttgart. Interested in theater, she went to Munich, where she took acting classes with Ernst Fritz Fürbringer. In 1967, she had her first role at the theater in Kassel.

In 1969, she played the lead role in Peter Fleischmann's film Jagdszenen aus Niederbayern. After seeing this film, Peter Stein offered her a position at the Berliner Schaubühne. Winkler performed in Berlin from 1971 to 1978.

Her next film, The Lost Honour of Katharina Blum, directed by Volker Schlöndorff and Margarethe von Trotta, made her a star in 1975. For the role of Katharina Blum, she received the Filmband in Gold. In 1979, she won international fame as the mother of Oskar Matzerath in Schlöndorff's Oscar-winning film The Tin Drum, an adaption of the famous book of the same name by Günter Grass.

More recently, Winkler appeared in Dark (2017), the first German-language Netflix original series, and as Miss Tanner in Luca Guadagnino's Suspiria (2018).

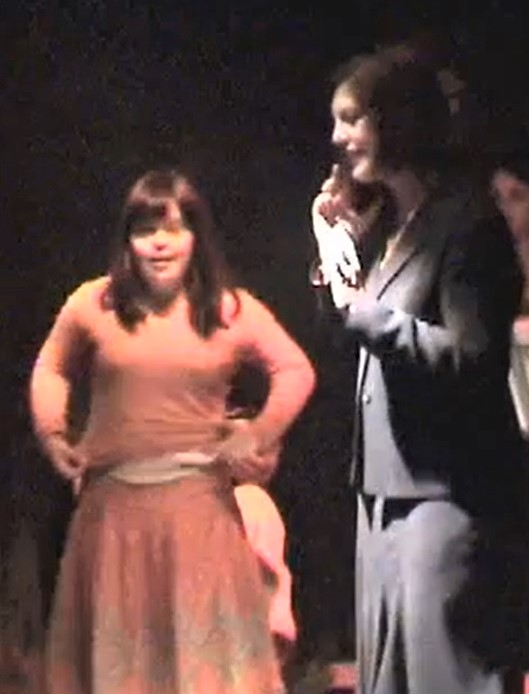
Nele and Angela Winkler performing at Cabaret Phoneyisland Berlin in 2009

Winkler lives with sculptor Wiegand Wittig and has four children. Her daughter Nele, who has Down syndrome, is also an actress; she had a role in Dora or The Sexual Neuroses of Our Parents and is a member of the ensemble at RambaZamba theatre in Berlin.

== Filmography ==
- Jagdszenen aus Niederbayern (1969)
- The Lost Honour of Katharina Blum (1975)
- Die Linkshändige Frau (1978)
- Messer im Kopf (1978)
- Germany in Autumn (1978)
- The Tin Drum (1979)
- Letzte Liebe (1979)
- La provinciale (1981)
- War and Peace (1982)
- Danton (1983)
- Heller Wahn (1983)
- Edith's Diary (1983)
- De grens (1984)
- Bronstein's Children (1991)
- Benny's Video (1992)
- Der Kopf des Mohren (1995)
- The Bubi Scholz Story (1998)
- Das Geheimnis im Moor (2006)
- Die Flucht
- Vacation (2007)
- House of the Sleeping Beauties (2008)
- Three (2010)
- Hell (2011)
- Clouds of Sils Maria (2014)
- Autumn Tingles: Speed Dating for Silver Hairs (2014, TV film)
- Dark (2017)
- Suspiria (2018)
- Sisi & I (2023)

== Awards ==
- 2006: Ibsen Centennial Commemoration Award

== Theater ==
- 1996 The Cherry Orchard by Anton Chekhov (Burgtheater, Wien), director: Peter Zadek
- 1999 Hamlet by William Shakespeare (Wiener Festwochen), director: Peter Zadek
- 2000 Rosmersholm by Henrik Ibsen (as Rebekka, Burgtheater, Wien), director: Peter Zadek
- 2002 Anatol by Arthur Schnitzler (as Gabriele, Burgtheater, Wien), director: Luc Bondy
- 2003 The Night of the Iguana by Tennessee Williams (as Hannah Jelkes, Burgtheater, Wien), director: Peter Zadek
- 2003 Mutter Courage und ihre Kinder by Bertolt Brecht (as Mutter Courage, Deutsches Theater Berlin), director: Peter Zadek
- 2004 Peer Gynt by Henrik Ibsen (as Aase, Berliner Ensemble), director: Peter Zadek
- 2005 The Winter's Tale by William Shakespeare (as Paulina, Berliner Ensemble), director: Robert Wilson
- 2007 Die Dreigroschenoper by Bertolt Brecht (as Jenny, Berliner Ensemble), director: Robert Wilson
