= Patricia Highsmith =

American novelist (1921–1995)

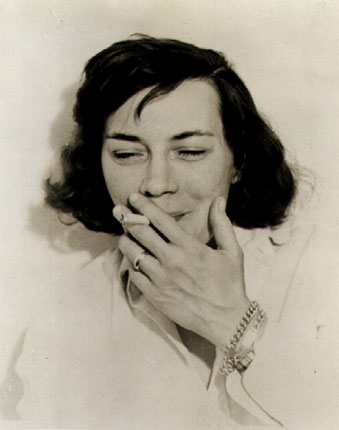
- Highsmith in 1962
- Born: Mary Patricia Plangman; January 19, 1921; Fort Worth, Texas, U.S.
- Died: February 4, 1995 (aged 74); Locarno, Ticino, Switzerland
- Education: Julia Richman High School
- Alma mater: Barnard College (BA)
- Occupations: Novelist; short story writer
- Writing career
- Pen name: Claire Morgan (1952)
- Language: English
- Period: 1942–1995
- Genres: Suspense; psychological thriller; crime fiction; romance
- Notable works: Strangers on a Train; The Price of Salt (a.k.a. Carol); The Talented Mr. Ripley; The Cry of the Owl; The Tremor of Forgery
- Movement: Modernist literature

Patricia Highsmith (born Mary Patricia Plangman; January 19, 1921 – February 4, 1995) was an American novelist and short story writer widely known for her psychological thrillers, including her series of five novels featuring the character Tom Ripley. She wrote 22 novels and numerous short stories in a career spanning nearly five decades, and her work has led to more than two dozen film adaptations. Her writing was influenced by existentialist literature and questioned notions of identity and popular morality. She was dubbed "the poet of apprehension" by novelist Graham Greene.

Born in Fort Worth, Texas, and mostly raised in her infancy by her maternal grandmother, Highsmith was taken to New York City at the age of six to live with her mother and stepfather. After graduating from Barnard College in 1942, she worked as a writer for comic books while writing her own short stories and novels in her spare time. Her literary breakthrough came with the publication of her first novel Strangers on a Train (1950) which was adapted into a 1951 film directed by Alfred Hitchcock. Her 1955 novel The Talented Mr. Ripley was well received in the United States and Europe, cementing her reputation as a major writer of psychological thrillers.

In 1963, Highsmith moved to England where her critical reputation continued to grow. Following the breakdown of her relationship with a married Englishwoman, she moved to France in 1967 to try to rebuild her life. Her sales were now higher in Europe than in the United States, which her agent attributed to her subversion of the conventions of American crime fiction. She moved to Switzerland in 1982, and continued to publish new work that increasingly divided critics. The last years of her life were marked by ill health; she died of aplastic anemia and lung cancer in Switzerland in 1995.

The Times said of Highsmith: "she puts the suspense story in a toweringly high place in the hierarchy of fiction." Her second novel, The Price of Salt, published under a pseudonym in 1952, was ground-breaking for its positive depiction of lesbian relationships and optimistic ending. She remains controversial for her antisemitic, racist, and misanthropic statements.

== Early life ==
Highsmith was born Mary Patricia Plangman in Fort Worth, Texas, on January 19, 1921. She was the only child of commercial artists Jay Bernard Plangman (1889–1975) and Mary Plangman (née Coates; September 13, 1895 – March 12, 1991). Her father had not wanted a child and had persuaded her mother to have an abortion. Her mother, after a failed attempt to abort her by drinking turpentine, decided to leave Plangman. The couple divorced nine days before their daughter's birth.

Patricia's mother married commercial artist Stanley Highsmith in 1924; the family moved to New York City in 1927. Patricia excelled at school and read widely, including works by Jack London, Louisa May Alcott, Robert Louis Stevenson, Bram Stoker, and John Ruskin. At the age of nine, she became fascinated by the case histories of abnormal psychology in The Human Mind by Karl Menninger, a popularizer of Freudian analysis. In the summer of 1933, Highsmith attended a girls' camp, and the letters she wrote home were published as a story two years later in Woman's World magazine. She was paid US$25 for the story. After returning from camp, she was sent to Fort Worth and lived with her maternal grandmother for a year; she called this the "saddest year" of her life and felt "abandoned" by her mother. In 1934 she returned to New York to live with her mother and stepfather in Greenwich Village, Manhattan. She was unhappy at home; she hated her stepfather, and developed a life-long love–hate relationship with her mother, which she later fictionalized in stories such as "The Terrapin", about a young boy who stabs his mother to death.

She attended the all-girl Julia Richman High School where she achieved a B minus average grade. She continued to read widely—Edgar Allan Poe was a favorite—and began writing short stories and a journal. Her story "Primroses Are Pink" was published in the school literary magazine.

In 1938 Highsmith entered Barnard College, where her studies included English literature, playwriting and short story composition. Fellow students considered her a loner who guarded her privacy, but she formed a life-long friendship with fellow student Kate Kingsley Skattebol. She continued to read voraciously, kept diaries and notebooks, and developed an interest in eastern philosophy, Marx and Freud. She also read Thomas Wolfe, Marcel Proust and Julien Green with admiration. She published nine stories in the college literary magazine and became its editor in her senior year.

== Apprentice writer ==
After graduating in 1942, Highsmith, despite endorsements from "highly placed professionals," applied without success for a job at publications such as Harper's Bazaar, Vogue, Mademoiselle, Good Housekeeping, Time, Fortune, and The New Yorker. She eventually found work with FFF Publishers which provided copy for various Jewish publications. The job, which paid $20 per week, lasted only six months but gave her experience in researching stories.

In December 1942 Highsmith found employment with comic book publisher Sangor–Pines where she earned up to $50 per week. She wrote "Sergeant Bill King" stories, contributed to Black Terror and Fighting Yank comics, and wrote profiles such as Catherine the Great, Barney Ross, and Capt. Eddie Rickenbacker for the "Real Life Comics" series. After a year, she realized she could make more money and have more flexibility for travel and serious writing by working freelance for comics and she did so until 1949. From 1943 to 1946, under editor Vincent Fago at Timely Comics, she contributed to its U.S.A. Comics wartime series, writing scenarios for characters such as "Jap Buster Johnson" and The Destroyer. For Fawcett Publications she scripted characters including "Crisco and Jasper." She also wrote for True Comics, Captain Midnight and Western Comics. Working for comics was the only long-term job Highsmith ever held.

Highsmith considered comics boring "hack work" and was determined to become a novelist. In the evenings she wrote short stories which she submitted, unsuccessfully, to publications such as The New Yorker. In 1944 she spent five months in Mexico where she worked on an unfinished novel "The Click of the Shutting". On her return to Manhattan she worked on another unfinished novel "The Dove Descending".

The following year, "The Heroine," a story about a pyromaniac nanny that she had written in 1941, was published by Harper's Bazaar. The publishers Knopf wrote her that they were interested in publishing any novels she might have. Nothing, however, came from their subsequent meeting. Highsmith's agents advised her that her stories needed to be more "upbeat" to be marketable but she wanted to write stories that reflected her vision of the world.

In 1946, Highsmith read Albert Camus' The Stranger and was impressed by his absurdist vision. The following year she commenced writing Strangers on a Train, and her new agent submitted an early draft to a publisher's reader who recommended major revisions. Based on the recommendation of Truman Capote, Highsmith was accepted by the Yaddo artist's retreat during the summer of 1948, where she worked on the novel.

Strangers on a Train was accepted for publication by Harper & Brothers in May 1949. The following month, Highsmith sailed to Europe where she spent three months in England, France and Italy. In Italy, she visited Positano which would later become the major setting for her novel The Talented Mr. Ripley. She read an anthology of Kierkegaard on the trip and declared him her new "master".

== Established writer ==
Highsmith returned to New York in October 1949 and began writing The Price of Salt, a novel about a lesbian relationship. Strangers on a Train was published in March 1950 and received favorable reviews in The New Yorker, New York Herald Tribune and New York Times. The novel was shortlisted for the Edgar Allan Poe Prize and Alfred Hitchcock secured the film rights for $6,000. Sales increased after the release of the film.

In February 1951, she left for Europe for the publication of the novel in England and France. She stayed for two years, traveling and working on an unfinished novel, "The Traffic of Jacob's Ladder," which is now lost. She wrote Skattebol, "I can imagine living mostly in Europe the rest of my life."

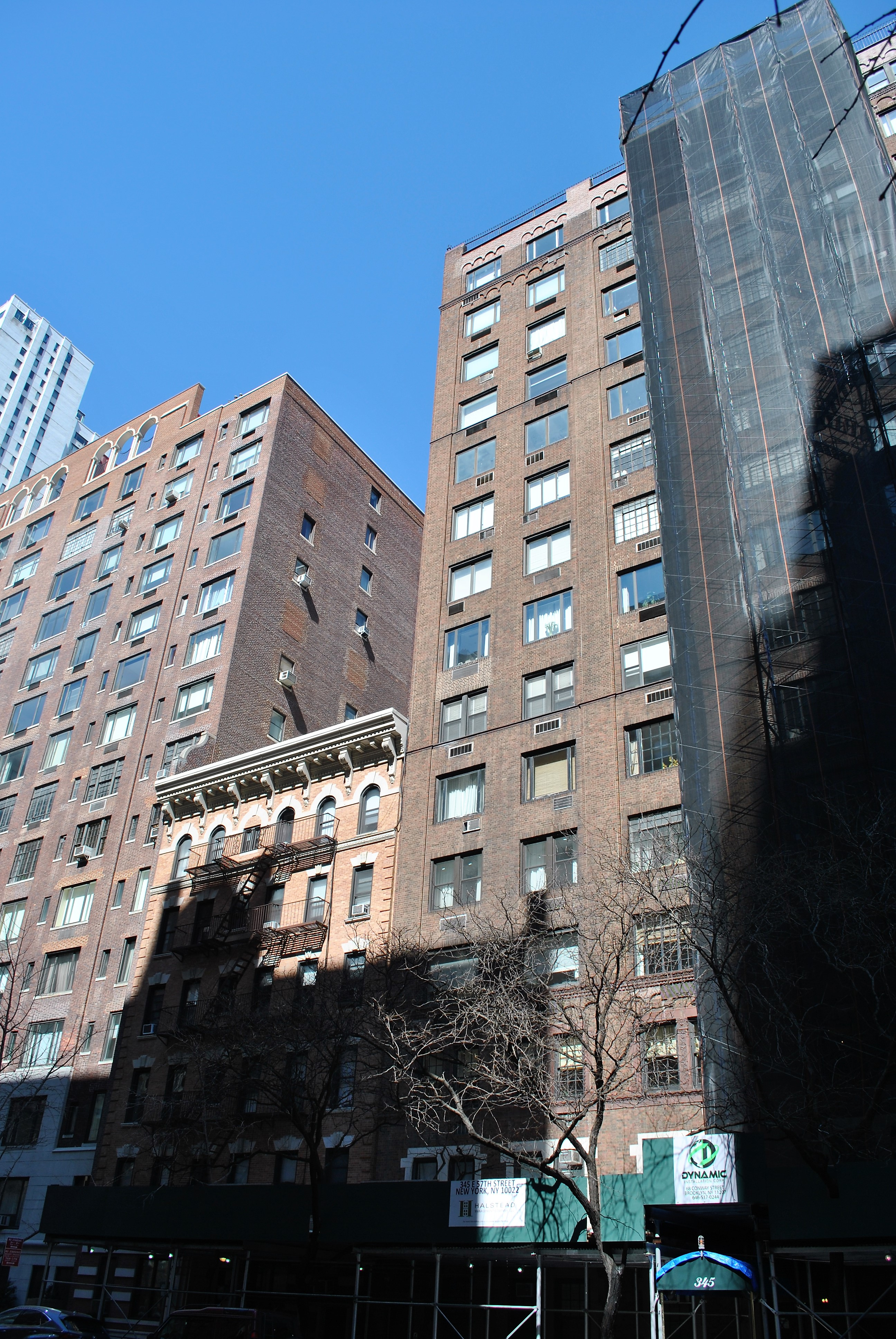
345 E. 57th Street, NYC – Residence of Patricia Highsmith

Highsmith was back in New York in May 1953. The Price of Salt had been published in hardback under a pseudonym the previous May, and sold well in paperback in 1953. It was praised in the New York Times Book Review for "sincerity and good taste" but the reviewer found the characters underdeveloped. The novel made Highsmith a respected figure in the New York lesbian community, but as she did not publicly acknowledge authorship, it did not further her literary reputation.

In September 1953, Highsmith traveled to Fort Worth where she completed a fair copy of The Blunderer which was published the following year. In 1954 she worked on a new novel, The Talented Mr. Ripley, about a young American who kills a rich compatriot in Italy and assumes his identity. She completed the novel in six months in Lenox, Santa Fe, and Mexico.

The Talented Mr. Ripley was published in December 1955 to favorable reviews in the New York Times Book Review and The New Yorker, their critics praising Highsmith's convincing portrait of a psychopath. The novel went on to win the Edgar Allan Poe Scroll of the Mystery Writers of America.Highsmith biographer Richard Bradford states that the novel "forged the basis for her long term reputation as a writer."

Highsmith moved to the affluent hamlet of Palisades, New York State, in 1956 and lived there for over two years. In March 1957, her story "A Perfect Alibi" was published in Ellery Queen's Mystery Magazine, beginning a long-term association with the publication.She also completed two further novels, Deep Water (published in 1957) and A Game for the Living (1958), and a children's book, Miranda the Panda is on the Veranda (1958), that she co-authored with Doris Sanders.

In December 1958, Highsmith moved back to Manhattan where she wrote This Sweet Sickness. The novel was published in February 1960 to generally favorable reviews. From September 1960, she lived near New Hope, Pennsylvania. There she saw René Clement's Plein Soleil (1960), the French film adaptation of The Talented Mr. Ripley, but she was disappointed by its moralistic ending. She also wrote The Cry of the Owl which she completed in February 1962. Although Highsmith considered it one of her worst novels, novelist Brigid Brophy later rated it, along with Lolita, as one of the best since World War II.

Highsmith spent 1962 shuttling between New Hope and Europe and finishing the novel The Two Faces of January. She had fallen in love with a married English woman and wanted to live closer to her. In February 1963, she moved permanently to Europe.

== England and France ==
Highsmith rented an apartment in Positano where she worked on her prison novel The Glass Cell. She then traveled to London where she promoted The Cry of the Owl, newly published in Britain. In November 1963 she moved to the town of Aldeburgh, Suffolk, and the following year she bought a home in the nearby village of Earl Soham where she lived for three years.

During this time, Highsmith's critical reputation in the United Kingdom grew. Francis Wyndham wrote a long article on Highsmith for the New Statesman in 1963 which introduced her work to many readers. Brigid Brophy, also writing in the New Statesman, praised The Two Faces of January (1964) stating that Highsmith had made the crime story literature. Julian Simmons in The Sunday Times commended Highsmith's subtle characterization. The novel won the Silver Dagger Award of the British Crime Writers' Association for best foreign novel of 1964.

Highsmith was quarreling with her mother and under severe emotional strain due to her difficult relationship with her English lover. She was drinking heavily and her private and public behavior was becoming more eccentric and antisocial. When her love affair ended in late 1966, she decided to move to France.

After a brief visit to Tunisia, Highsmith moved to the Île-de-France in 1967 and eventually settled at Montmachoux in April 1968. Her novels of this period include The Tremor of Forgery (1969), which Graham Greene considered her finest work, and Ripley Under Ground (1970) which gained generally positive reviews. Her books, however, were selling poorly in America which her agent suggested was because they were "too subtle".

In 1970, Highsmith flew to the United States, where she visited New York and her family in Fort Worth. She drew on her trip for her novel A Dog's Ransom (1972), which is set in Manhattan. In November 1970, she moved to the village of Moncourt, in the Moselle region of France. The novels she wrote there include Ripley's Game (1974), Edith's Diary (1977), and The Boy Who Followed Ripley (1980). In 1977, she saw Wim Wenders's The American Friend, a loose adaptation of Ripley's Game. She praised the film but was displeased with Dennis Hopper's performance as Ripley. The next year, she was elected chair of the jury for the Berlin Film Festival.

In 1980, Highsmith underwent bypass surgery to correct uncontrolled bleeding and serious cardiovascular problems. Soon thereafter, the French authorities fined her for taxation irregularities, prompting her to comment, "How appropriate, to be bleeding in two places." Disillusioned with France, she bought a house in Aurigeno, Switzerland, and in 1982 moved there permanently.

== Switzerland and final years ==
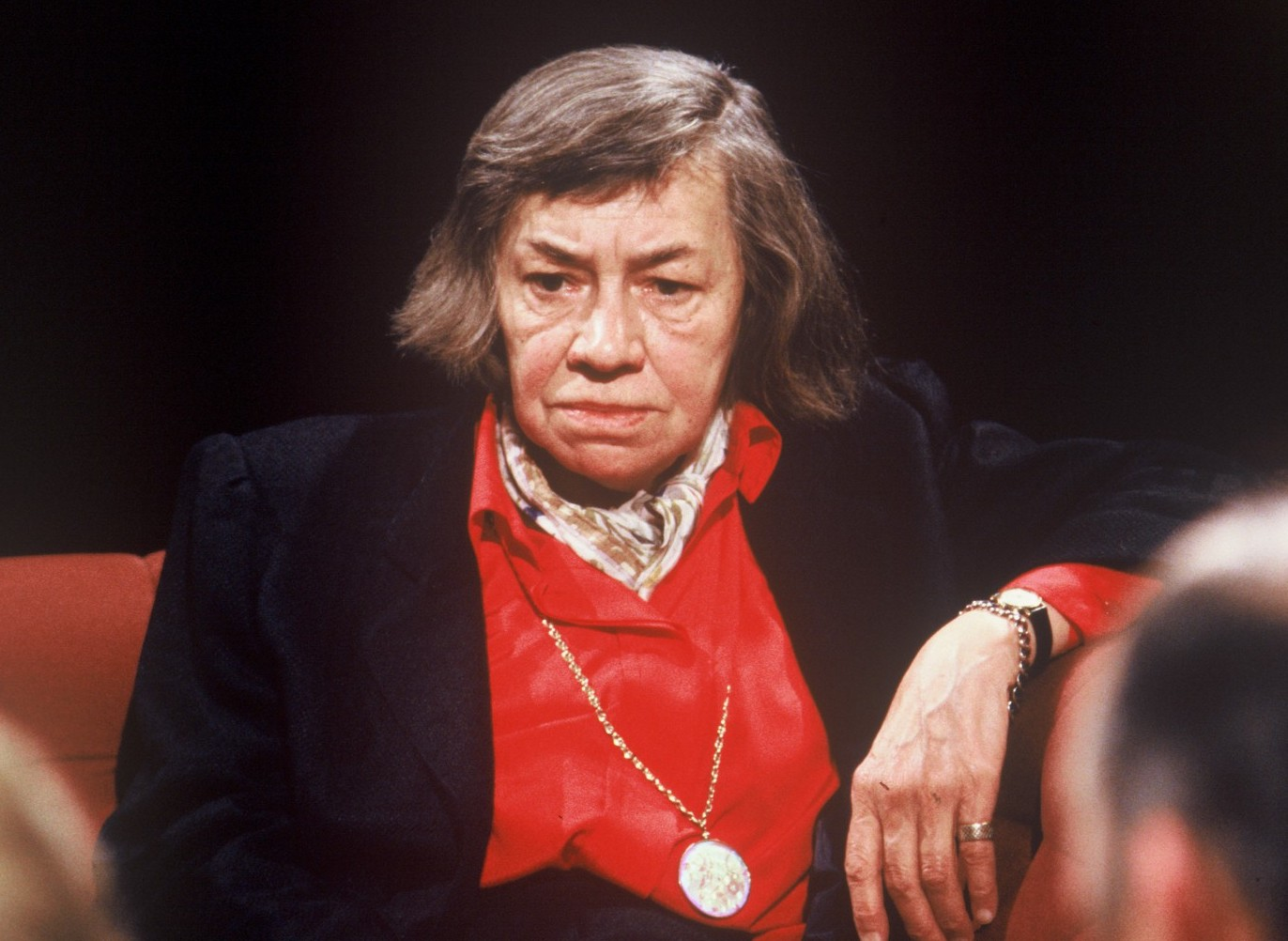
Highsmith discussing murder on British television programme After Dark (June 1988)

In 1981, Highsmith moved into her Swiss home and began writing a new novel, People Who Knock on the Door (1983), about the influence of Christian fundamentalism in America. This and her next novel, Found in the Street (1986), were partly based on a research trip to America in early 1981. Her biographer Joan Schenkar writes that by this time Highsmith had been living in Europe so long she "began to make errors of American fact and understanding in her novels." Highsmith described People Who Knock on the Door as "a flat book, but popular in France, Germany and E[ast] Germany."

In 1986, Highsmith had a successful operation for lung cancer. Shortly thereafter, she commissioned a new home in Tegna, Switzerland. The home was in the brutalist style and her friends called it "the bunker". There she completed her last two novels, Ripley Under Water (1991) and Small g: A Summer Idyll (1995). In 1990 she was made an Officer of the Order of Arts and Letters of France. In 1993 her health deteriorated and she required the help of a home carer.

Highsmith died on February 4, 1995, at 74, from aplastic anemia and lung cancer at Carita Hospital in Locarno, Switzerland, near Tegna. She was cremated at the cemetery in Bellinzona; a memorial service was conducted in the Chiesa di Tegna in Tegna and her ashes were interred in its columbarium.

She left her estate, worth an estimated $3 million, and the promise of any future royalties, to the Yaddo colony, where she spent two months in 1948 writing the draft of Strangers on a Train. (Note: During her lifetime, Highsmith supported Yaddo with contributions she preferred to keep anonymous. One of these gifts created an endowed fund to underwrite an annual residency for a young creative artist working in any medium. At her request the residency is now known as the "Patricia Highsmith-Plangman Residency".) Highsmith bequeathed her literary estate to the Swiss Literary Archives at the Swiss National Library in Bern, Switzerland. Her Swiss publisher, Diogenes Verlag, which had principal rights to her work, was appointed literary executor of the estate.

Highsmith's last novel, Small g: a Summer Idyll, was rejected by Knopf (her most recent U.S. publisher) several months before her death. It was published in the United Kingdom by Bloomsbury Publishing in March 1995, and nine years later in the U.S. by W. W. Norton. It sold 50,000 copies in France within six weeks of her death.

Highsmith's literary estate included 8,000 pages of handwritten notebooks and diaries.

== Personal life ==
=== Health ===
Highsmith had anorexia as a teenager and episodes of depression throughout her life. Despite literary success, she wrote in her diary in January 1970: "am now cynical, fairly rich ... lonely, depressed, and totally pessimistic." She was an alcoholic who by middle age drank from breakfast till bedtime. She smoked 40 Gauloises cigarettes a day and rarely ate fruit or vegetables. In 1973 her doctor advised her that if she did not change her lifestyle she might not live past 55.

Highsmith underwent surgery in May 1980 for blockages in two arteries of her right leg, and in April 1986 she had successful surgery for lung cancer (of a type not related to smoking). In January 1992 she had a procedure to widen her left femoral artery, and in September 1993 she had surgery to remove a non-cancerous tumor in her lower intestine. Later in 1993 she was diagnosed with the aplastic anemia and lung cancer that would kill her.

=== Personality ===
To all the devils, lusts, passions, greeds, envies, loves, hates, strange desires, enemies ghostly and real, the army of memories, with which I do battle—may they never give me peace.

— Patricia Highsmith, "My New Year's Toast", journal entry, 1947

Highsmith was ambitious and socially active in the 1940s but always preferred smaller gatherings to large crowds and public functions. Despite her reputation as a recluse in her later years, she had a circle of friends, neighbors, and admirers she regularly saw in France and Switzerland, and she frequently corresponded with friends in Europe and America.

Highsmith's biographers, friends, and acquaintances describe her public and private behavior, especially from the 1960s, as often eccentric, rude, difficult and antisocial. She brought her pet snails to one dinner party in the 1960s and let them wander over the mahogany.At a dinner party in 1968 she deliberately lowered her head to a candle and set her hair on fire. She had two friends as houseguests in 1971 and threw a dead rat into their room. She often made racist or insensitive comments that offended and embarrassed those present. Those who knew her suggested this behavior might have resulted from depression, alcoholism, Asperger syndrome, or a personality disorder. A psychiatrist who observed her at a hotel in 1963 said to the owner, "You do realize you have a psychopath in the hall."

Many who knew her said she could also be funny and good company, but difficult. Her oldest friend, Kate Skattebol, said that at college she was "fun to be with and her sense of humour was great. She loved to shock people." British journalist Francis Wyndham, who met her in 1963, said, "I liked her immediately...I could tell that she was shy and reticent, a woman with deep feelings, someone who was affectionate but also difficult." Gary Fisketjon, her American editor in the 1980s, said, "She was very rough, very difficult ... But she was also plainspoken, dryly funny, and great fun to be around."

Highsmith lived alone for most of her adult life, saying in a 1991 interview, "I choose to live alone because my imagination functions better when I don't have to speak with people." Although she preferred her personal life to remain private, she took no steps to avoid the posthumous availability of her diaries and notebooks in which she recorded the motivations of her behavior.

=== Interests ===
Highsmith began keeping snails as pets in 1946 or 1949 as she was fascinated by their sexuality. Pet snails appear in her 1957 novel Deep Water, and her story "The Snail Watcher" is about pet snails who kill their owner. She kept 300 snails at her home in Earl Soham and occasionally took some with her on social outings. She said that when she moved to France she smuggled her snails into the country in her bra. Schenkar, however, believes this is only an amusing story and that she smuggled her snails in cottage cheese cartons.

Her other hobbies included woodworking, painting and gardening. Diogenes Verlag published a book of her drawings in 1995.She was an accomplished gardener, but in her later years her friends and neighbors did most of the work on her gardens.

=== Sexuality ===
Highsmith's sexual relationships were predominantly with women. She occasionally engaged in sex with men without physical desire for them, writing in her diary in 1948: "The male face doesn't attract me, isn't beautiful to me." In a 1970 letter to her stepfather, Highsmith described sex with men as like "steel wool in the face, a sensation of being raped in the wrong place—leading to a sensation of having to have, pretty soon, a boewl [sic] movement." Phyllis Nagy called Highsmith "a lesbian who did not very much enjoy being around other women" whose few affairs with men occurred just to "see if she could be into men in that way because she so much more preferred their company."

Highsmith called herself "basically polygamous" and was consistently unfaithful to her lovers. She noted in her 1949 diary that she could sustain a relationship no longer than two to three years. In 1943, she wrote, "there is something perverted within me, that I don't love a girl anymore if she loves me more than I love her." According to biographer Andrew Wilson, "She would be forever prone to falling in love but always happiest when alone."

Highsmith held varying views about her sexuality throughout her life. In 1942, she wrote that lesbians were inferior to gay men because they never sought their equals. Later she told author Marijane Meaker: "the only difference between us and heterosexuals is what we do in bed." In 1970 she wrote to a friend: "We all become reconciled to being queer and prefer life that way."

Highsmith refused to speak publicly about her sexuality, repeatedly telling interviewers: "I don't answer personal questions about myself or other people." When she finally agreed, in 1990, to have The Price of Salt republished under her own name as Carol she was still reluctant to discuss her sexuality. But in 1978, she wrote a friend that after her death a future biographer must discuss her love life and "everyone must know I am queer or gay."

=== Relationships ===
Schenkar calls Highsmith's mother, Mary, "the great love of Pat Highsmith's life—and, certainly, her greatest hate." In 1967 Highsmith wrote: "I adored my mother, and could see no wrong in her, until I was near 17." But she felt her mother had abandoned her at the age of 12, when she had left her in Fort Worth so she could attempt a reconciliation with Stanley Highsmith in New York. She later blamed her mother for her failed relationships, writing: "I never got over it. Thus I seek out women who will hurt me in a similar manner, and avoid the women who are—good eggs." Highsmith also blamed her mother for her introverted personality, saying that when she was 14 her mother had asked her whether she was a lesbian in a way that made her feel "like a cripple on the street."

Relations between the two were often difficult. When Highsmith's mother stayed with her in England for six days in 1965 it ended in a physical altercation and Highsmith had to call her doctor, who sedated both women. Highsmith blamed her tense adult relationship with her mother on Mary's jealousy over her female friends and lovers. Her mother broke off relations with Highsmith by letter in 1974, and lived in a nursing home from 1975 until her death in 1991. During this time, Highsmith and her mother did not communicate with each other.

Bradford argues that Highsmith's love life represented a combination of romantic fantasies and a desire for social advancement: "throughout her life, Highsmith looked for women whom she could worship."Her partner Ellen Hill told her she was in love only with fantasy figures: "She [Hill] says, I fit the person to my wishes, find they don't fit, and proceed to break it off." According to Bradford, until her middle age, "She only truly desired women who came from the kind of social, cultural and intellectual ranking to which she aspired. More significantly, she seemed particularly attracted to women who had been born into privilege."

In 1941 Highsmith met Rosalind Constable, a 34-year-old British journalist and literary consultant. Wilson describes Constable as a "blond", "elegant" "cultured sophisticate." Highsmith fell in love with Constable but the relationship was not sexual. Constable promoted her career, introducing her to cultural figures and later recommending her to the Yaddo community.

In 1943 Highsmith had a brief affair with artist Allela Cornell, who killed herself three years later over another failed relationship. Highsmith nevertheless felt guilty over her death and prominently displayed Cornell's oil portrait of her in all her homes. Cornell was the inspiration for the artist Derwatt in Ripley Under Ground.

Highsmith began a year-long affair with the rich socialite Virginia Kent Catherwood in June 1946. Catherwood was one of the models for Carol Aird in The Price of Salt. (Note: The character of Carol Aird and much of the plot of The Price of Salt was inspired by Highsmith's former lovers Kathryn Hamill Cohen and Philadelphia socialite Virginia Kent Catherwood, and her relationships with them. Catherwood lost custody of her daughter in divorce proceedings that involved tape-recorded lesbian trysts in hotel rooms.)

During her stay at Yaddo in 1948, Highsmith met writer Marc Brandel, son of author J. D. Beresford. Even though she told him she was homosexual, they soon began a relationship. In November Highsmith underwent six months of psychoanalysis in an effort "to regularize herself sexually" so she could marry him. They became engaged in May 1949, just before her first trip to Europe. Their relationship ended in the fall of 1950.

Highsmith and Brandel had other sexual partners during their relationship. In 1948 she started an intermittent relationship with Ann Smith, a painter and designer. The relationship ended in 1950 but the two remained friends. While in Europe in 1949, Highsmith had an affair with psychoanalyst Kathryn Hamill Cohen, the wife of British publisher Dennis Cohen and founder of Cresset Press, which later published Strangers on a Train. Kathryn ended the affair by letter in April 1950.

To help pay for her therapy sessions, in December 1948 Highsmith took a sales job in the toy section of Bloomingdale's department store. One day she served an elegant blonde woman in a mink coat who left her delivery details. Her name was Kathleen Senn and the encounter inspired Highsmith to begin writing The Price of Salt. She twice went to Senn's home to secretly observe her and, though they never met, Highsmith wrote that Senn "almost made me love her."

While in Munich In September 1951, Highsmith met the German sociologist Ellen Hill, who, according to Schenkar, "had the longest, strongest influence on Pat's life (after mother Mary)". They lived and traveled together in Europe and America until July 1953, when Hill attempted suicide after Highsmith threatened to end their relationship. They resumed their relationship in September 1954 and it lasted until December 1955. They established a difficult friendship after this, which endured until Highsmith broke with her in 1988.

In March 1956, Highsmith began a relationship with Doris Sanders, an advertising illustrator and copywriter. They lived together in Palisades, New York, and traveled to Mexico, where Highsmith set her novel A Game for the Living. Highsmith left Sanders in December 1958 after initiating an affair with another woman.

In the spring of 1959, Highsmith met writer Marijane Meaker. They began a relationship, and when Highsmith returned from a publicity tour of Europe in 1960 they lived together near New Hope, Pennsylvania. The relationship was stormy, and after six months Highsmith moved to another house in New Hope. When their relationship collapsed in 1961, Meaker included a character based on Highsmith in her novel Intimate Victims (1962). Highsmith did likewise in her novel The Cry of the Owl.

While in Europe in the summer of 1962, Highsmith met an Englishwoman who was married to a wealthy businessman and who had a child. Highsmith had an affair with her and fell in love. Highsmith's Swiss editor, Anna von Planta, calls the anonymous Englishwoman the "love of her life". Highsmith moved to England in 1963 to be closer to her lover and eventually settled in Earl Soham, Suffolk, in 1964. Her lover, whose husband knew of the affair, visited Highsmith on weekends and they had occasional holidays in Europe. When it became clear to Highsmith that the woman would not leave her husband for her, she became increasingly jealous of the time her lover spent with her family. Her lover, in turn, was jealous of the time Highsmith spent with former lovers, including Ellen Hill. The affair ended in October 1966 and Highsmith called the breakup "the very worst time of my entire life."

After Highsmith moved to France in 1967 she had several affairs with women who were 20 to 30 years younger. After moving to Switzerland in 1982 she was celibate for the rest of her life.

== Views ==
=== Politics ===
Influenced by the Spanish Civil War, Highsmith became a member of the Young Communist League while at Barnard in 1939. She left the party in November 1941. Over the following decades, she consistently opposed war and big business and was concerned about environmental issues. She was a swing voter, voting for the Democrat Walter Mondale in 1984, Republican George H. W. Bush in 1988, and independent Ross Perot in 1992. She described herself as a liberal or social democrat but admired Margaret Thatcher because of her policy of tax cuts and wrote that she would not sacrifice any of her money to help the poor. She believed that people were responsible for their destiny and that society was not to blame for the problems of individuals.

Highsmith supported Palestinian self-determination. As a member of Amnesty International, she felt duty-bound to express publicly her opposition to the displacement of Palestinians. Highsmith prohibited her books from being published in Israel after the election of Menachem Begin as prime minister in 1977. She dedicated her 1983 novel People Who Knock on the Door to the Palestinian people:

To the courage of the Palestinian people and their leaders in the struggle to regain a part of their homeland. This book has nothing to do with their problem.

Highsmith donated money to the Jewish Committee on the Middle East, an organization that represented American Jews who supported Palestinian self-determination. She wrote in an August 1993 letter to Meaker: "USA could save 11 million per day if they would cut the dough to Israel. The Jewish vote is 1%."

Highsmith's support of Palestinian rights, according to Nagy, "often teetered into outright antisemitism."

Highsmith was an avowed antisemite; she called herself a "Jew hater" and described The Holocaust as "the semicaust" and "Holocaust, Inc." While living in Switzerland in the 1980s, she used nearly 40 aliases when writing to government bodies and newspapers deploring the Israeli state and the influence of the Jews.

Highsmith also expressed racist and prejudiced views about other social groups, including black Americans. She said black people were responsible for a welfare crisis in America and spoke of their "animal-like breeding habits". Skattebol called her an "equal opportunity offender...You name the group, she hated them."

=== Women ===
Highsmith was called a misogynist by some critics and some of those who knew her. In 1942 she wrote: "A woman's stupidity, absence of imagination, her childlike, retarded cruelty, cannot be equalled in the animal kingdom. Men's energies are naturally more constructive and healthy." Wilson argues that Highsmith was a misanthrope rather than a misogynist. In 1969, she said she was becoming "increasingly misanthropic."

In 1984 she said she had suffered no injustices because of her sex and that she disliked feminists because they were always "whining, always complaining about something. Instead of doing something." But in a 1992 interview she said: "I can be in favour of women's causes, but I don't join them. If it's a matter of donating a little money, or signing something, I might, but not extra work."

=== Religion ===
When young, Highsmith was influenced by the religious views of her mother, who was a Christian Scientist. She rejected Christian Science at 21 but still believed in God. At 28 she wrote, "A certain calm is essential in order to live. Relief from anxiety. I myself can never have this without belief in the power of God which is greater than man and all the power in the universe." She often wrote about God and Jesus in her journals, and she sang in a church choir until she was 37. In 1977 she said she no longer believed in God either as an abstract power or as a presence in the human soul. In 1985 she said she disliked "people who believe that some god or other really has control over everything but is not exercising that control just now."Bruno Sager, who was her home carer in 1993, discussed religion with her and said she "was one of these persons searching for some kind of god or soul but she never could stand the cages of Catholicism or any of the other religions. She was not an atheist, not at all."

=== Animals ===
Highsmith was outraged at human cruelty to animals, such as battery chicken farming. Her story collection The Animal Lovers Book of Beastly Murder (1975) features mistreated animals that take revenge on humans. Skatterbol says that Highsmith saw animals as "individual personalities often better behaved, and endowed with more dignity and honesty than humans." She was particularly fond of cats, saying they "provide something for writers that humans cannot: companionship that makes no demands or intrusions." In 1991 Highsmith said that if she came across a starving kitten and a starving baby she would feed the kitten.

Several of her friends attested to her kindness to animals, but some visitors to Highsmith's homes in France and Switzerland said she mistreated her cats, including swinging one around in a towel to make it dizzy for her guests' amusement . She also disliked dogs and admitted to secretly kicking a neighbor's dog she thought was misbehaving. Bradford argues that her animal stories anthropomorphize them and give them the worst human characteristics.

== Major works ==
=== Strangers on a Train ===
Schenkarand Bradford consider Highsmith's first novel, Strangers on a Train, one of her finest works. Bradford writes that the book "made her name as a writer capable of evoking the horrific and the grotesque." Her agent, Patricia Schartle, said that the basic idea of two strangers exchanging murders was one of "two almost perfect flashes of brilliance in her career."

The novel introduces major themes in Highsmith's work, including the complementary nature of good and evil, an implied homoerotic attraction between male antagonists, and shifting identities. On the novel's release, a New York Herald Tribune critic praised its suspenseful plotting and perceptive portrayal of a psychopath. A critic for The Times Literary Supplement criticized it as a confected thriller with a preposterous plot.

=== The Price of Salt ===
How was it possible to be afraid and in love, Therese thought. The two things did not go together. How was it possible to be afraid, when the two of them grew stronger together every day? And every night. Every night was different, and every morning. Together they possessed a miracle.

— The Price of Salt, chapter eighteen (Coward-McCann, 1952)

Highsmith's second novel, The Price of Salt, was published in 1952 under the pen name Claire Morgan. Highsmith partly based the character Therese on herself. The novel broke new ground in American lesbian fiction because of its hopeful ending (Note: Marijane Meaker (who wrote lesbian pulp fiction novels under the pseudonyms of "Ann Aldrich" and "Vin Packer") stated in her memoir: "[The Price of Salt] was for many years the only lesbian novel, in either hard or soft cover, with a happy ending." Schenkar and Talbot, however, point out that the character Carol has to give up custody of her child to continue her relationship with Therese. Schenkar calls the book: "a lesbian novel with an almost happy ending." Talbot calls the novel: "a youthful book, and a hopeful one.") and departure from lesbian stereotypes. In what BBC 2's The Late Show presenter Sarah Dunant called a "literary coming out" after 38 years of denial, Highsmith acknowledged authorship of the novel publicly when she agreed, in 1990, to its republication by Bloomsbury under the title Carol. Highsmith wrote in the "Afterword" to the new edition:

If I were to write a novel about a lesbian relationship, would I then be labelled a lesbian-book writer? That was a possibility, even though I might never be inspired to write another such book in my life. So I decided to offer the book under another name. ... The appeal of The Price of Salt was that it had a happy ending for its two main characters, or at least they were going to try to have a future together. Prior to this book, homosexuals male and female in American novels had had to pay for their deviation by cutting their wrists, drowning themselves in a swimming pool, or by switching to heterosexuality (so it was stated), or by collapsing – alone and miserable and shunned – into a depression equal to hell.

The paperback version of the novel sold nearly one million copies before its 1990 reissue. The Price of Salt is the only Highsmith novel in which no violent crime takes place and, according to Harrison, the only one in which sexual relations are portrayed openly and positively.

=== The "Ripliad" ===
Wilson calls Highsmith's first Tom Ripley novel, The Talented Mr. Ripley, "One of her most powerful and celebrated novels." She went on to write four sequels (in the series sometimes called the "Ripliad") and by 1989, according to Bradford, "Ripley had become for her the equivalent of Conan Doyle's Holmes, even Shakespeare's Hamlet, the figure who defined her as a writer." Critic Anthony Hilfer sees Ripley as an exemplar of the "protean or perpetually self-inventing man" who can transform himself into anyone by mimicking their external traits.

Highsmith wrote that in her first Ripley novel she was showing, "the unequivocal triumph of evil over good and rejoicing in it. I shall make my readers rejoice in it too." Bradford argues that one of the strengths of the first Ripley novel is that it implicates its readers in an amoral world: "There was a general consensus that while the main character was vile and immoral Highsmith had somehow insulated him from the reader's inclination to judge."

Tom Ripley has been variously described by commentators as "repellent and fascinating," "a cold blooded killer with a taste for the finer things in life," and "an amoral but charming psychopath." A critic for The Times Literary Supplement noted that in the second Ripley novel, Ripley Under Ground (1970), Ripley's new wealth had not made him more normal, but had turned him into "a contented psychopath." Ripley is a serial killer who always gets away with his crimes. Shenkar believes "Ripley becomes more successful (and less interesting) with each new Ripley novel." Critic Noel Mawer argues that in the later novels Ripley becomes less a "psychotic in his world of delusion" and more an "amoral, unfeeling sociopath who feels that murder is simply a necessity to protect what...[he] feels he has earned and deserved."

== Reception of work ==
Highsmith's critical reputation was divided in her lifetime. Marghanita Laski denounced her work as immoral and lacking human decency. Other commentators, most notably Graham Greene, considered the moral ambiguity of her work a strength. Although her novels were often critically acclaimed in the U.S. and Britain, they sold more poorly there than in continental Europe, where her critical and popular reputation was higher. Peak U.S. sales for her novels on initial publication were under 8,000 each. The Tremor of Forgery and Ripley Under Ground (1970) sold just under 7,000 in their first year in Britain. Found in the Street (1987) sold 4,000 copies in the U.S. and 40,000 in Germany.

Since Highsmith's death, her novels of the 1950s and 1960s have attracted the most critical acclaim. Bradford considers Strangers on a Train, The Price of Salt, and The Talented Mr. Ripley her most accomplished novels, writing, "Highsmith has done more than anyone to erode the boundaries between crime writing as a recreational sub-genre and literature as high art."

== Themes, style and genre ==
=== Themes ===
Highsmith's themes were influenced by Dostoevsky, Kierkegaard, Nietzsche, Kafka, and the existentialism of Sartre and Camus. Wilson argues that her work presents an amoral world view in which murderers go unpunished or are only punished by chance. In 1966, Highsmith wrote: "neither life nor nature cares whether justice is ever done or not."

Irrational behavior, abnormal psychology and extreme emotional states are recurrent themes. Bradford writes, "Issues such as guilt, hatred, self-loathing and unfulfilled longing which Highsmith endlessly contemplated without resolution became the cocktail for her fictional narratives and characters." Critic Russell Harrison states that Highsmith's protagonists often act irrationally because of self-imposed emotional constraints. According to Graham Greene, "Her characters are irrational and they leap to life in the very lack of reason; suddenly we realize how unbelievably rational most fictional characters are."

Highsmith explored issues of double, splintered and shifting identities. Wilson states that many of her novels involve a struggle between two men who search out an opposite but defining doppelgänger. Critic Fiona Peters points out that The Talented Mr. Ripley and This Sweet Sickness involve protagonists who create false identities. Harrison argues: "the theme of an individual transforming himself or herself, of the willed construction of a personality, once again suggest[s] existentialism's emphasis on individual choice free of any hint of determinism through history or genetics."

Critic David Cochran sees Highsmith's work as a critique of suburban America: "According to the dominant vision, a family, house in the suburbs and successful job equalled mental health and happiness, whereas the absence of these things led to sickness. But Highsmith consistently worked to break down these oppositions too. Especially in her view of American men, Highsmith subverted many of the ideological bases of the suburban ideal."

Male homosexual desire was a subtext of many of Highsmith's early works. Biographer Joan Schenkar states that the typical Highsmith situation is "two men bound together psychologically by the stalker-like fixation of one upon the other, a fixation that always involves a disturbing, implicitly homoerotic fantasy." Highsmith explored lesbian relationships in The Price of Salt. Homosexuality was an important theme in later novels such as Found in the Street (1986) and Small g: a Summer Idyll (1995).

=== Style ===
Highsmith mostly wrote in the third-person singular from the point of view of the main character who is usually male. In several novels she alternates the point of view of two leading male characters. In 1966, she explained that a single point of view "increased the intensity of a story" whereas a double point of view brings a "change of pace and mood."

Wilson calls Highsmith's prose style crisp, compact and near transparent. Schenkar describes her narrative tone as a "low, flat compellingly psychotic murmur." Wilson describes her tone as amoral, adding: "The mundane and the trivial are described in the same pitch as the horrific and the sinister and it is this unsettling juxtaposition that gives her work such power."

Commentators have variously described the atmosphere evoked by Highsmith's work as one of suspense, apprehension or unease. Graham Greene called her "the poet of apprehension." Peters states: "Highsmith's forte is anxiety: rather than merely turning the page to discover what happens next – in other words to be held in a state of suspense – her readers are suspended in a haze of dread, anxiety and apprehension." Wilson argues that Highsmith disturbs her readers by manipulating them into identifying with unconventional psychologies: "Highsmith's world is seen through the distorted perspective of an 'abnormal' man, but the style of writing is so transparent and flat that by the end the reader aligns himself with a point of view that is clearly unbalanced and disturbed."

=== Genre ===
Highsmith was usually classified as a crime, suspense or mystery writer in the U.S.; in Europe she was considered a psychological or literary novelist. Peters argues that she does not fit comfortably within accepted genres. Bradford considers The Talented Mr. Ripley a precursor to gothic realism. Harrison argues that psychological realism is not prominent in her work and considers The Price of Salt one of her most social realist novels. Some of her short stories, such as "The Snail-Watcher," have been classified as horror.

== Honors ==
- 1990 : Officier de l'Ordre des Arts et des Lettres, French Ministry of Culture
- 2008 : Greatest Crime Writer, The Times

=== Awards and nominations ===
- 1946 : O. Henry Award, Best First Story, for The Heroine (in Harper's Bazaar)
- 1951 : Nominee, Edgar Allan Poe Award, Best First Novel, Mystery Writers of America, for Strangers on a Train
- 1956 : Edgar Allan Poe Scroll (special award), Mystery Writers of America, for The Talented Mr. Ripley
- 1957 : Grand Prix de Littérature Policière, International, for The Talented Mr. Ripley
- 1963 : Raven Award, Mystery Writers of America, for "The Terrapin" (published in Ellery Queen's Mystery Magazine)
- 1964 : Silver Dagger Award, Best Foreign Novel, Crime Writers' Association, for The Two Faces of January (pub. Heinemann)
- 1977 : Prix de l'Humour noir Xavier Forneret for Little Tales of Misogyny (joint winner with illustrator Roland Topor)
- 1988 : Prix littéraire Lucien Barrière, Festival du Cinéma Américain de Deauville

== Novels ==
The following list of Highsmith's novels is taken from Wilson. The novels featuring Tom Ripley are listed separately as the "Ripliad".

- Strangers on a Train (1950)
- The Price of Salt (1952) (as Claire Morgan) (republished as Carol in 1990 under Highsmith's name)
- The Blunderer (1954)
- Deep Water (1957)
- A Game for the Living (1958)
- This Sweet Sickness (1960)
- The Cry of the Owl (1962)
- The Two Faces of January (1964)
- The Glass Cell (1964)
- A Suspension of Mercy (1965) (published as The Story-Teller in the U.S.)
- Those Who Walk Away (1967)
- The Tremor of Forgery (1969)
- A Dog's Ransom (1972)
- Edith's Diary (1977)
- People Who Knock on the Door (1983)
- Found in the Street (1986)
- Small g: a Summer Idyll (1995)

The "Ripliad"

- The Talented Mr. Ripley (1955)
- Ripley Under Ground (1970)
- Ripley's Game (1974)
- The Boy Who Followed Ripley (1980)
- Ripley Under Water (1991)

== Adaptations of Highsmith works ==
Several of Highsmith's works have been adapted for other media, some more than once.

=== Film ===
- 1951: Strangers on a Train was adapted as a film of same name directed by Alfred Hitchcock starring Farley Granger as Guy Haines, Robert Walker as Bruno Anthony, Ruth Roman as Anne Morton, Patricia Hitchcock as Barbara Morton and Laura Elliott as Miriam Joyce Haines.
- 1963: The Blunderer was adapted as French language film Le meurtrier ("The Murderer"), directed by Claude Autant-Lara starring Maurice Ronet as Walter Saccard, Yvonne Furneaux as Clara Saccard, Gert Fröbe as Melchior Kimmel, Marina Vlady as Ellie and Robert Hossein as Corbi. It is known in English as Enough Rope.
- 1969: Strangers on a Train was adapted as Once You Kiss a Stranger, directed by Robert Sparr starring Paul Burke as Jerry, Carol Lynley as Diana and Martha Hyer as Lee.
- 1977: This Sweet Sickness was adapted as French language film Dites-lui que je l'aime, directed by Claude Miller starring Gérard Depardieu as David Martineau, Miou-Miou as Juliette, Dominique Laffin as Lise, and Jacques Denis as Gérard Dutilleux. It is known in English as This Sweet Sickness.
- 1978: The Glass Cell was adapted as German language film Die gläserne Zelle, directed by Hans W. Geißendörfer starring Brigitte Fossey as Lisa Braun, Helmut Griem as Phillip Braun, Dieter Laser as David Reinelt and Walter Kohut as Robert Lasky.
- 1981: Deep Water was adapted as French language film Eaux profondes, directed by Michel Deville starring Isabelle Huppert as Melanie and Jean-Louis Trintignant as Vic Allen.
- 1983: Edith's Diary was adapted as German language film Ediths Tagebuch, directed by Hans W. Geißendörfer starring Angela Winkler as Edith.
- 1986: The Two Faces of January was adapted as German language film Die zwei Gesichter des Januars, directed by Wolfgang Storch starring Charles Brauer as Chester McFarland, Yolanda Jilot as Colette McFarland and Thomas Schücke as Rydal Keener.
- 1987: The Cry of the Owl was adapted as French language film Le cri du hibou, directed by Claude Chabrol starring Christophe Malavoy as Robert, Mathilda May as Juliette, Jacques Penot as Patrick and Virginie Thévenet as Véronique.
- 1987: The film version of Strangers on a Train by Alfred Hitchcock inspired the black comedy American film Throw Momma from the Train, directed by Danny DeVito.
- 1989: A Suspension of Mercy (aka The Story Teller) was adapted as German language film Der Geschichtenerzähler, directed by Rainer Boldt starring Udo Schenk as Nico Thomkins and Anke Sevenich as Helen Thomkins.
- 2009: The Cry of the Owl was adapted as a film of same name, directed by Jamie Thraves starring Paddy Considine as Robert Forester and Julia Stiles as Jenny Thierolf.
- 2014: The Two Faces of January was adapted as a film of same name, written and directed by Hossein Amini starring Viggo Mortensen as Chester MacFarland, Kirsten Dunst as Colette MacFarland and Oscar Isaac as Rydal. It was released during the 64th Berlin International Film Festival.
- 2014: A Mighty Nice Man was adapted as a short film, directed by Jonathan Dee starring Kylie McVey as Charlotte, Jacqueline Baum as Emilie, Kristen Connolly as Charlotte's Mother, and Billy Magnussen as Robbie.
- 2015: A film adaptation of The Price of Salt, titled Carol, was written by Phyllis Nagy and directed by Todd Haynes, starring Cate Blanchett as Carol Aird and Rooney Mara as Therese Belivet.
- 2016: The Blunderer was adapted as A Kind of Murder, directed by Andy Goddard starring Patrick Wilson as Walter Stackhouse, Jessica Biel as Clara Stackhouse, Haley Bennett as Ellie Briess, and Eddie Marsan as Mitchell "Marty" Kimmel.
- 2022: Deep Water was adapted again, directed by Adrian Lyne starring Ben Affleck and Ana de Armas.

==== "Ripliad" ====
- 1960: The Talented Mr. Ripley was adapted as French language film Plein soleil (titled Purple Noon for English-language audiences, though it translates as "Full Sun"). Directed by René Clément starring Alain Delon as Tom Ripley, Maurice Ronet as Philippe Greenleaf, and Marie Laforêt as Marge Duval. Both Highsmith and film critic Roger Ebert criticized the screenplay for altering the ending to prevent Ripley from going unpunished as he does in the novel.
- 1977: Ripley's Game (third novel) and a "plot fragment" of Ripley Under Ground (second novel) were adapted as German language film Der Amerikanische Freund (The American Friend). Directed by Wim Wenders with Dennis Hopper as Ripley. Highsmith initially disliked the film but later found it stylish, although she did not like how Ripley was interpreted.
- 1999: The Talented Mr. Ripley was adapted as an American production. Directed by Anthony Minghella with Matt Damon as Ripley, Jude Law as Dickie Greenleaf, and Gwyneth Paltrow as Marge Sherwood.
- 2002: Ripley's Game was adapted as a film of same name for an English language Italian production. Directed by Liliana Cavani with John Malkovich as Ripley, Chiara Caselli as Luisa Harari Ripley, Ray Winstone as Reeves Minot, Dougray Scott as Jonathan Trevanny, and Lena Headey as Sarah Trevanny. Although not all reviews were favorable, Roger Ebert regarded it as the best of all the Ripley films.
- 2005: Ripley Under Ground was adapted as a film of same name. Directed by Roger Spottiswoode with Barry Pepper as Ripley, Jacinda Barrett as Héloïse Plisson-Ripley, Willem Dafoe as Neil Murchison, and Tom Wilkinson as John Webster.
- 2024: Ripley is an American television series that premiered on Netflix in 2024, with Steven Zaillian directing, and Andrew Scott as Tom Ripley.

=== Television ===
- 1958: Strangers on a Train was adapted by Warner Brothers for an episode of the TV series 77 Sunset Strip.
- 1982: Scenes from the Ripley novels were dramatized in the episode A Gift for Murder of The South Bank Show, with Jonathan Kent portraying Tom Ripley. The episode included an interview with Patricia Highsmith.
- 1983: Deep Water was adapted as a two-part miniseries for German television as Tiefe Wasser, directed by Franz Peter Wirth starring Peter Bongartz as Vic van Allen, Constanze Engelbrecht as Melinda van Allen, Reinhard Glemnitz as Dirk Weisberg, Raimund Harmstorf as Anton Kameter, and Sky du Mont as Charley de Lisle.
- 1987: The Cry of the Owl was adapted for German television as Der Schrei der Eule, directed by Tom Toelle starring Matthias Habich as Robert Forster, Birgit Doll as Johanna Tierolf, Jacques Breuer as Karl Weick, Fritz Lichtenhahn as Inspektor Lippenholtz, and Doris Kunstmann as Vicky.
- 1993: The Tremor of Forgery was adapted as German television film Trip nach Tunis, directed by Peter Goedel starring David Hunt as Howard Ingham, Karen Sillas as Ina Pallant and John Seitz as Francis J. Adams.
- 1995: Little Tales of Misogyny was adapted as Spanish/Catalan television film Petits contes misògins, directed by Pere Sagristà starring Marta Pérez, Carme Pla, Mamen Duch, and Míriam Iscla.
- 1996: Strangers on a Train was adapted for television as Once You Meet a Stranger, directed by Tommy Lee Wallace starring Jacqueline Bisset as Sheila Gaines ("Guy"), Theresa Russell as Margo Anthony ("Bruno") and Celeste Holm as Clara. The gender of the two lead characters was changed from male to female.
- 1996: A Dog's Ransom was adapted as French television film La rançon du chien, directed by Peter Kassovitz starring François Négret as César, François Perrot as Edouard Raynaud, Daniel Prévost as Max Ducasse and Charlotte Valandrey as Sophie.

=== Theatre ===
- 1998: The Talented Mr. Ripley was adapted for the stage as a play of same name by playwright Phyllis Nagy. It was revived in 2010.
- 2013: Strangers on a Train was adapted as a play of same name by playwright Craig Warner.

=== Radio ===
- 2002: A four-episode radio drama of The Cry of the Owl was broadcast by BBC Radio 4, with voice acting by John Sharian as Robert Forester, Joanne McQuinn as Jenny Theirolf, Adrian Lester as Greg Wyncoop, and Matt Rippy as Jack Neilsen.
- 2009: All five books of the "Ripliad" were dramatized by BBC Radio 4, with Ian Hart voicing Tom Ripley.
- 2014: A five-segment dramatization of Carol (aka The Price of Salt) was broadcast by BBC Radio 4, with voice acting by Miranda Richardson as Carol Aird and Andrea Deck as Therese Belivet.
- 2019: A five-episode broadcast of selected short stories (One for the Islands, A Curious Suicide, The Terrors of Basket-Weaving, The Man Who Wrote Books In His Head, The Baby Spoon) by BBC Radio 4.

== Novels, films, plays, and art about Highsmith ==
Novels

- Dawson, Jill (2016). The Crime Writer. Sceptre. ISBN 978-1444731118.

Graphic Novels

- Ellis, Grace; Templer, Hannah (2022). Flung Out of Space: Inspired by the Indecent Adventures of Patricia Highsmith (1st ed.). New York: Abrams ComicArts. ISBN 978-1419744334.

Films

- Highsmith: Her Secret Life (2004), made for television documentary by Hugh Thomson, BBC Four.
- Loving Highsmith (2022), theatrical documentary by Eva Vitija, Ensemble Film GmbH.
- The Murderous Miss Highsmith (2026) Directed by Alexandra Pechman, starring Shailene Woodley, Cara Delevingne and Noémie Merlant. Highsmith's life is reimagined as a horror movie.
- A Talent for Murder (2026) directed by Anton Corbijn. The screenplay by Joanna Murray-Smith, based on her 2014 play Switzerland, centers on the final chapter of Highsmith's life in Switzerland. Helen Mirren plays Patricia Highsmith.

Plays

- Murray-Smith, Joanna (2015). Switzerland. Dramatists Play Service. ISBN 978-0-8222-3435-7. (First presented at Sydney Theatre Company in November 2014).

Art

- Bodman, Sarah; Campbell, Nancy (2021). "Dinner and a Rose". UWE Bristol Research Repository. University of the West of England. (A tribute to the food and drinks mentioned in The Talented Mr. Ripley.)

== Audio interviews ==
- "Patricia Highsmith". Desert Island Discs. BBC Radio 4. April 21, 1979. Archived from the original on May 28, 2016.
- "The Black House by Patricia Highsmith". Meridian. BBC World Service. August 8, 1980. Archived from the original on May 2, 2017.
- "Patricia Highsmith on her Thrilling Fiction". Fresh Air with Terry Gross. NPR. October 27, 1987. Archived from the original on August 5, 2020.
- "Patricia Highsmith interviewed by Don Swaim on October 29, 1987". Book Beat. WCBS-Radio. October 29, 1987. (via Ohio University Libraries Digital Archives)
- "Patricia Highsmith, In Conversation". ICA talks. Institute of Contemporary Arts. September 27, 1991. Archived from the original on February 22, 2014.

== See also ==
- Ruth Rendell: A "mistress of suspense" contemporary of Highsmith for whom Highsmith acknowledged rarely admitted admiration. Rendell explored characters and themes similar to Highsmith's.
