= The Cry of the Owl =

Psychological thriller novel by Patricia Highsmith

- First edition
- Author: Patricia Highsmith
- Language: English
- Genre: Psychological thriller, novel
- Publisher: Harper & Row
- Publication date: 1962
- Publication place: United States

The Cry of the Owl is a psychological thriller novel by Patricia Highsmith, the eighth of her 22 novels. It was first published in the US in 1962 by Harper & Row and in the UK by Heinemann the following year. It explores, in the phrase of critic Brigid Brophy, "the psychology of the self-selected victim".

== Composition ==
Highsmith wrote The Cry of the Owl between April 1961 and February 1962. She considered it to be one of her weaker efforts, calling its principal character "rather square ... a polite sitting duck for more evil characters, and a passive bore".

Highsmith drew on her own experience as a stalker; years before, when employed by a New York City store, she became obsessed with a woman she had waited on. She adapted these events for her novel The Price of Salt (1952).

The setting for this book is much like the area where Highsmith was currently living in New Hope, Pennsylvania.

The title refers to Jenny's belief that foreboding incidents precede events in her life, which are determined by fate. She considers the owl a harbinger of death. She also believes that, just as years ago an unknown man appeared in her family's house before her younger brother's death, so Robert's appearance foretells a death.

Highsmith ended her relationship with Marijane Meaker about the time she started work on this novel, in April 1961. Meaker told an interviewer that Highsmith modeled the character of Nickie after her as an act of "retaliation".

The novel is dedicated only to "D.W.", an apparent reference to Daisy Winston, Highsmith's former lover and neighbor in New Hope.

== Plot summary ==
Following a painful divorce from his wife Nickie, Robert Forester leaves New York and moves to small-town Langley, Pennsylvania, where he develops an obsession for 23-year-old Jenny Thierolf. He spies on her through her kitchen window, enjoying "the girl's placid temperament, her obvious affection for her rather ramshackle house, her contentment with her life". He is surprised when she invites him into her house after spotting him one night. Each seems to represent something more for the other than it appears, to embody a larger emotional force than a mere personality. Robert explains to his therapist: "'I have the definite feeling if everybody in the world didn't keep watching to see what everybody else did, we'd all go berserk. Left on their own, people wouldn't know how to live.'"

Jenny sees their chance meeting as an act of fate and breaks off her engagement to hot-tempered Greg Wyncoop, who is resentful and begins spying on the pair; he plans to learn more about Robert so as to find a way to get even with him. Greg picks up information from Nickie as well, and she encourages him to find a way to punish her ex-husband. During the next weeks, Jenny pursues Robert, contacting him at his home and at his job at Langley Aeronautics. Robert is offered a promotion at work that requires him to relocate to another city, and he hopes this will put an end to Jenny's advances, which are making him increasingly uneasy.

One night, on a road, Greg starts a fight with Robert that ends when Robert knocks Greg unconscious and leaves him on a river bank. When Greg is reported missing, the police suspect Robert has murdered him, though Robert in fact was the victim of Greg's attack and had last seen Greg alive. The police feel that their suspicions about Robert are confirmed when Nickie tells them that he once threatened her with a weapon. After a newspaper publishes an article about the case, Robert's promotion is withdrawn. A badly decomposed body is found in the river and the police think it is Greg's, but identification proves difficult. Jenny comes to believe that Robert has murdered her former fiancé and, in spite of loving him, accepts that he represents death and that it is preordained that she should die; she commits suicide.

Nickie's new husband Ralph Jurgen informs Robert that Greg is alive, that Greg and Nickie have staged Greg's disappearance in order to frame Robert. Greg then begins stalking Robert at his home and taking shots at him. One of the bullets eventually hits Robert; the police do not seem to believe that Greg is alive and Robert's neighbors condemn him for 'leading a young girl astray' and 'leading her to her death'. The doctor who tends to him invites him to stay at his home to recover. There, Greg fires a shot which wounds the doctor, eventually resulting in the man's death.

The police finally see the truth and arrest Greg, but release him on bail. He goes to see Nickie and together they go to Robert's home, which he is about to leave for good, and a final confrontation occurs. Greg tries to knife Robert but instead kills Nickie. Robert will again be front and center in a death investigation.

== Reception ==
In the New York Times, Thomas Lask wrote that "Miss Highsmith starts in low gear and the first fourth of the book marks time as she goes through some preliminary passes. Her characters are only puppets. But once it starts rolling the tale accelerates rapidly, dangers and suspense pile up and the reader goes along very willingly to the conclusion. And a gory one it is, too."

In 1967, British writer and critic Brigid Brophy stated that, of the novels written in the last twenty years, five or six stood out, including Highsmith's The Cry of the Owl and Vladimir Nabokov's Lolita.

== Film, TV or theatrical adaptations ==
Highsmith's novel was the premise for the French film Le Cri du hibou (1987) directed by Claude Chabrol and starring Mathilda May.

Also in 1987, German writer-director Tom Toelle directed an adaption for West German television titled Der Schrei der Eule.

A third film adaptation written and directed by Jamie Thraves and starring Julia Stiles and Paddy Considine was released in 2009.

German director Wim Wenders sought to buy the rights for a screen adaption in the 1970s, but finding the rights unavailable chose to make Highsmith's Ripley's Game into the film Der Amerikanische Freund.

A 4-part radio dramatisation was broadcast on BBC Radio 4 in 2002. Adapted by Shaun McKenna it starred Joanne McQinn, John Sharian and Adrian Lester.
