= List of fictional antiheroes =

This list is for characters in fictional works who exemplify the qualities of an antihero—a protagonist or supporting character whose characteristics include the following:

- imperfections that separate them from typically heroic characters (such as selfishness, cynicism, ignorance, and bigotry);
- lack of positive qualities such as "courage, physical prowess, and fortitude", and "generally feel helpless in a world over which they have no control";
- qualities considered dark traits, usually belonging to villains, (amorality, greed, violent tendencies, etc.) that may be tempered with more human, identifiable traits that blur the moral lines between the protagonist and antagonist.

Each of these examples has been identified by a critic as an antihero, although the classification remains fairly subjective. Some of the entries may be disputed by other sources and some may contradict all established definitions of antihero.

== Literature ==
Character	Work	Author	First published	Ref.
Lázaro de Tormes	Lazarillo de Tormes	anonymous	1554	
Shylock	The Merchant of Venice	William Shakespeare	1596	
Prince Hamlet	Hamlet	William Shakespeare	1599–1602	
Othello	Othello	William Shakespeare	1603	
Lady Macbeth	Macbeth	William Shakespeare	1623	
Satan	Paradise Lost	John Milton	1667	
Phèdre	Phèdre	Jean Racine	1677	
Redmond Barry	The Luck of Barry Lyndon	William Makepeace Thackeray	1844	
Edward Rochester	Jane Eyre	Charlotte Brontë	1847	
Becky Sharp	Vanity Fair	William Makepeace Thackeray	1847–1848	
Raskolnikov	Crime and Punishment	Fyodor Dostoevsky	1866	
Huckleberry Finn	Adventures of Huckleberry Finn	Mark Twain	1884	
Stephen Dedalus	A Portrait of the Artist as a Young Man; Ulysses	James Joyce	1916; 1922	
Jay Gatsby	The Great Gatsby	F. Scott Fitzgerald	1925	
Quentin Compson	The Sound and the Fury	William Faulkner	1929	
Sam Spade	The Maltese Falcon	Dashiell Hammett	1930	
Scarlett O'Hara	Gone with the Wind	Margaret Mitchell	1936	
Pinkie Brown	Brighton Rock	Graham Greene	1938	
Bigger Thomas	Native Son	Richard Wright	1940	
Meursault	The Stranger	Albert Camus	1942	
Bob Jones	If He Hollers Let Him Go	Chester Himes	1945	
Annie Allen	Annie Allen	Gwendolyn Brooks	1949	
Holden Caulfield	The Catcher in the Rye	J. D. Salinger	1951	
The Narrator	Invisible Man	Ralph Ellison	1952	
Cross Damon	The Outsider	Richard Wright	1953	
James Bond	James Bond novels and short stories	Ian Fleming	1953–1966	
Humbert Humbert	Lolita	Vladimir Nabokov	1955	
Tom Ripley	The Talented Mr. Ripley; Ripley Under Ground; Ripley's Game; The Boy Who Followed Ripley; Ripley Under Water	Patricia Highsmith	1955–1991	
Okonkwo	Things Fall Apart	Chinua Achebe	1958	
Elric of Melniboné	Elric of Melniboné	Michael Moorcock	1961	
Yossarian	Catch-22	Joseph Heller	1961	
Alex	A Clockwork Orange	Anthony Burgess	1962	
Paul Atreides	Dune	Frank Herbert	1965	
Rosencrantz and Guildenstern	Rosencrantz and Guildenstern Are Dead	Tom Stoppard	1966	
Woland	The Master and Margarita	Mikhail Bulgakov	1967	
Wei Xiaobao	The Deer and the Cauldron	Jin Yong	1969	
Harry Flashman	The Flashman Papers	George MacDonald Fraser	1969	
Alexander Portnoy	Portnoy's Complaint	Philip Roth	1969	
Michael Corleone	The Godfather	Mario Puzo	1969	
Raoul Duke	Fear and Loathing in Las Vegas	Hunter S. Thompson	1971	
Lestat de Lioncourt	The Vampire Chronicles Series	Anne Rice	1976–2018	
Macon "Milkman" Dead III	Song of Solomon	Toni Morrison	1977	
Fëanor	The Silmarillion	J.R.R. Tolkien	1977	
Túrin Turambar	The Silmarillion; Unfinished Tales; The Lays of Beleriand; The Children of Húrin	J.R.R. Tolkien	1977–2007	
Randall Flagg	The Stand; Eyes of the Dragon; The Dark Tower series	Stephen King	1978–2012	
Dr. Hannibal Lecter	Red Dragon	Thomas Harris	1981	
Roland Deschain	The Dark Tower series	Stephen King	1982–2012	
Francis "Frank" Cauldhame	The Wasp Factory	Iain Banks	1984	
Dr. Hannibal Lecter	The Silence of the Lambs	Thomas Harris	1988	
Geralt of Rivia	The Witcher	Andrzej Sapkowski	1986	
Shrek	Shrek!	William Steig	1990	
Mark Renton	Trainspotting	Irvine Welsh	1993	
Tyler Durden and the Narrator	Fight Club	Chuck Palahniuk	1996	
Tyrion Lannister	A Game of Thrones; A Clash of Kings; A Storm of Swords; A Feast for Crows; A Dance with Dragons	George R. R. Martin	1996–present	
Severus Snape	Harry Potter series	J. K. Rowling	1997–2007	
Bruce Robertson	Filth	Irvine Welsh	1998	
Artemis Fowl II	Artemis Fowl series	Eoin Colfer	2001	
Dexter Morgan	Darkly Dreaming Dexter; Dearly Devoted Dexter; Dexter in the Dark; Dexter by Design; Dexter Is Delicious; Double Dexter; Dexter's Final Cut; Dexter is Dead	Jeff Lindsay	2004–2015	
Lisbeth Salander	The Girl with the Dragon Tattoo	Stieg Larsson	2005	
Greg Heffley	Diary of a Wimpy Kid	Jeff Kinney	2007–present	
Christian Grey	Fifty Shades of Grey; Fifty Shades Darker; Fifty Shades Freed; Grey; Darker; Freed	E. L. James	2011–2021	

== Film ==
Character	Film	Portrayed by	Year	Ref.
Tom Powers	The Public Enemy	James Cagney	1931	
Caesar Enrico "Rico" Bandello / "Little Caesar"	Little Caesar	Edward G. Robinson	1931	
Tony Camonte	Scarface	Paul Muni	1932	
Donald Duck	Mickey Mouse short film series	Clarence Nash	1934–1966	
Scarlett O'Hara	Gone with the Wind	Vivien Leigh	1939	
Charles Foster Kane	Citizen Kane	Orson Welles	1941	
Rick Blaine	Casablanca	Humphrey Bogart	1942	
Shekhar & Madan	Kismet	Ashok Kumar	1943	
Fred C. Dobbs	The Treasure of the Sierra Madre	Humphrey Bogart	1948	
Arthur "Cody" Jarrett	White Heat	James Cagney	1948	
Michael J. 'Mike' McComb	Silver River	Errol Flynn	1948	
Midge Kelly	Champion	Kirk Douglas	1949	
Dilip	Andaz	Dilip Kumar	1949	
Tony Fernandes	Jaal	Dev Anand	1952	
Johnny Strabler	The Wild One	Marlon Brando	1953	
Jim Stark	Rebel Without a Cause	James Dean	1955	
Ethan Edwards	The Searchers	John Wayne	1956	
Radha	Mother India	Sunil Dutt	1957	
John "Scottie" Ferguson	Vertigo	James Stewart	1958	
Tom Ripley	Plein Soleil	Alain Delon	1960	
Norman Bates	Psycho	Anthony Perkins	1960	
Raghuvir	Kala Bazar	Dev Anand	1960	
Kuwabatake Sanjuro	Yojimbo	Toshiro Mifune	1961	
Sanjuro Tsubaki	Sanjuro	Toshiro Mifune	1962	
Hud Bannon	Hud	Paul Newman	1963	
Ranjit	Ayee Milan Ki Bela	Dharmendra	1964	
Man with No Name	Dollars Trilogy	Clint Eastwood	1964–1966	
Raja (Raju)	Waqt	Raaj Kumar	1965	
Diana Scott	Darling	Julie Christie	1965	
Harry Palmer	The Ipcress File	Michael Caine	1965	
Alfie Elkins	Alfie	Michael Caine	1966	
Guy Montag	Fahrenheit 451	Oskar Werner	1966	
Django	Django	Franco Nero	1966	
Shakti Singh / Shaaka	Phool Aur Patthar	Dharmendra	1966	
Bonnie Parker	Bonnie and Clyde	Faye Dunaway	1967	
Clyde Barrow	Bonnie and Clyde	Warren Beatty	1967	
Walker	Point Blank	Lee Marvin	1967	
"Cool Hand" Luke Jackson	Cool Hand Luke	Paul Newman	1967	
Butch Cassidy	Butch Cassidy and the Sundance Kid	Paul Newman	1969	
Sundance Kid	Butch Cassidy and the Sundance Kid	Robert Redford	1969	
Anil Choudhary	Aan Milo Sajna	Vinod Khanna	1970	
Alex DeLarge	A Clockwork Orange	Malcolm McDowell	1971	
Jack Carter	Get Carter	Michael Caine	1971	
Dirty Harry	Dirty Harry	Clint Eastwood	1971–1988	
Youngblood Priest	Super Fly	Ron O'Neal	1972	
Lope de Aguirre	Aguirre, the Wrath of God	Klaus Kinski	1972	
Michael Corleone	The Godfather trilogy	Al Pacino	1972–1990	
Tommy Gibbs	Black Caesar	Fred Williamson	1973	
Tommy Gibbs	Hell Up in Harlem	Fred Williamson	1973	
Eddie "Fingers" Coyle	The Friends of Eddie Coyle	Robert Mitchum	1973	
Insp. Vijay Khanna	Zanjeer	Amitabh Bachchan	1973	
Uuno Turhapuro	Uuno Turhapuro	Vesa-Matti Loiri	1973	
John "Johnny Boy" Civello	Mean Streets	Robert De Niro	1973	
Takuma Tsurugi	The Street Fighter	Sonny Chiba	1974	
Vijay Verma	Deewaar	Amitabh Bachchan	1975	
Jai (Jaidev)	Sholay	Amitabh Bachchan	1975	
Veeru	Sholay	Dharmendra	1975	
Randle McMurphy	One Flew Over the Cuckoo's Nest	Jack Nicholson	1975	
Sonny Wortzik	Dog Day Afternoon	Al Pacino	1975	
Quint	Jaws	Robert Shaw	1975	
Redmond Barry	Barry Lyndon	Ryan O'Neal	1975	
Carrie White	Carrie	Sissy Spacek	1976	
Travis Bickle	Taxi Driver	Robert De Niro	1976	
D.S.P. Shamsher Singh	Parvarish	Vinod Khanna	1977	
Bo "Bandit" Darville	Smokey and the Bandit trilogy	Burt Reynolds	1977–1983	
Han Solo	Star Wars	Harrison Ford	1977–2018	
Don	Don	Amitabh Bachchan	1978	
Amit Kapoor	Suhaag	Amitabh Bachchan	1979	
Max Rockatansky	Mad Max	Mel Gibson; Tom Hardy	1979–2015	
Anand	Red Rose	Rajesh Khanna	1980	
Jack Torrance	The Shining	Jack Nicholson	1980	
Jake LaMotta	Raging Bull	Robert De Niro	1980	
Indiana Jones	Indiana Jones film series	Harrison Ford	1981–2023	
Snake Plissken	Escape from New York; Escape from L.A.	Kurt Russell	1981; 1996	
Rick Deckard	Blade Runner; Blade Runner 2049	Harrison Ford	1982	
Rupert Pupkin	The King of Comedy	Robert De Niro	1982	
John Rambo	Rambo	Sylvester Stallone	1982–2018	
Tony Montana	Scarface	Al Pacino	1983	
Antonio Salieri	Amadeus	F. Murray Abraham	1984	
T-800 "Model 101"	The Terminator	Arnold Schwarzenegger	1984–present	
Gordon Gekko	Wall Street; Wall Street: Money Never Sleeps	Michael Douglas	1987; 2010	
Withnail	Withnail and I	Richard E. Grant	1987	
Betelgeuse	Beetlejuice	Michael Keaton	1988	
Frank Drebin	The Naked Gun	Leslie Nielsen	1988	
Veronica Sawyer	Heathers	Winona Ryder	1988	
Jason "J.D." Dean	Heathers	Christian Slater	1988	
John McClane	Die Hard film series	Bruce Willis	1988–2013	
Mookie	Do the Right Thing	Spike Lee	1989	
Peyton Westlake / Darkman	Darkman	Liam Neeson	1990	
Vijay Deenanath Chavan	Agneepath	Amitabh Bachchan	1990	
Henry Hill	Goodfellas	Ray Liotta	1990	
Thelma Yvonne Dickinson	Thelma & Louise	Geena Davis	1991	
Louise Elizabeth Sawyer	Thelma & Louise	Susan Sarandon	1991	
Dr. Hannibal Lecter	The Silence of the Lambs	Anthony Hopkins	1991	
Tequila Yuen	Hard Boiled	Chow Yun-fat	1992	
Catwoman / Selina Kyle	Batman Returns	Michelle Pfeiffer	1992	
William Munny	Unforgiven	Clint Eastwood	1992	
Richard Roma	Glengarry Glen Ross	Al Pacino	1992	
Hando	Romper Stomper	Russell Crowe	1992	
The Lieutenant	Bad Lieutenant	Harvey Keitel	1992	
D-Fens / William Foster	Falling Down	Michael Douglas	1993	
Kevin "O-Dog" Anderson	Menace II Society	Larenz Tate	1993	
Balaram "Ballu" Rakesh Prasad	Khal Nayak	Sanjay Dutt	1993	
Jack Grimaldi / Jim Daugherty	Romeo Is Bleeding	Gary Oldman	1993	
Rahul Mehra	Darr	Shah Rukh Khan	1993	
Vicky Malhotra (fake identity)/Ajay Sharma	Baazigar	Shah Rukh Khan	1993	
Oskar Schindler	Schindler's List	Liam Neeson	1993	
Léon	Léon: The Professional	Jean Reno	1994	
Eric Draven	The Crow	Brandon Lee	1994	
Jules Winnfield	Pulp Fiction	Samuel L. Jackson	1994	
Mickey Knox	Natural Born Killers	Woody Harrelson	1994	
Mallory Wilson Knox	Natural Born Killers	Juliette Lewis	1994	
Neil McCauley	Heat	Robert De Niro	1995	
Ernest Palmer	Get Shorty	John Travolta	1995	
Roger "Verbal" Kint	The Usual Suspects	Kevin Spacey	1995	
Brodie Bruce	Mallrats	Jason Lee	1995	
Seth Gecko	From Dusk till Dawn	George Clooney	1996	
Larry Flynt	The People vs. Larry Flynt	Woody Harrelson	1996	
Mark Renton	Trainspotting; T2 Trainspotting	Ewan McGregor	1996; 2017	
Jeffrey "The Dude" Lebowski	The Big Lebowski	Jeff Bridges	1998	
Raoul Duke	Fear and Loathing in Las Vegas	Johnny Depp	1998	
Cary	Your Friends & Neighbors	Jason Patric	1998	
Derek Vineyard	American History X	Edward Norton	1998	
Eric Brooks / Blade	Blade trilogy Deadpool & Wolverine	Wesley Snipes	1998–2004; 2024	
Porter	Payback	Mel Gibson	1999	
Tracy Flick	Election	Reese Witherspoon	1999	
Lester Burnham	American Beauty	Kevin Spacey	1999	
The Narrator	Fight Club	Edward Norton	1999	
Tyler Durden	Fight Club	Brad Pitt	1999	
Raghunath "Raghu" Namdev Shivalkhar	Vaastav: The Reality	Sanjay Dutt	1999	
Tom Ripley	The Talented Mr. Ripley	Matt Damon	1999	
Patrick Bateman	American Psycho	Christian Bale	2000	
Dev Ranjan Chopra	Dhadkan	Suniel Shetty	2000	
Om Srivastav / Mahendra Pratap Singhania	Shikari	Govinda	2000	
Riddick	The Chronicles of Riddick film series	Vin Diesel	2000–2013	
Ginger Fitzgerald	Ginger Snaps; Ginger Snaps 2: Unleashed; Ginger Snaps Back: The Beginning	Katharine Isabelle	2000 and both 2004	
James "Logan" Howlett / Wolverine	X-Men (film series); Deadpool & Wolverine	Hugh Jackman	2000–2017; 2024	
Alonzo Harris	Training Day	Denzel Washington	2001	
Vikram Bajaj (Vicky)	Ajnabee	Akshay Kumar	2001	
Donnie Darko	Donnie Darko	Jake Gyllenhaal	2001	
Severus Snape	Harry Potter film series	Alan Rickman	2001–2011	
Shrek	Shrek series	Mike Myers	2001–present	
Dominic Toretto	The Fast and the Furious film series	Vin Diesel	2001–present	
Roger Swanson	Roger Dodger	Campbell Scott	2002	
Jimmy "B-Rabbit" Smith Jr.	8 Mile	Eminem	2002	
Frank Martin	The Transporter film series	Jason Statham	2002–2008	
Jason Bourne	Bourne	Matt Damon	2002–2016	
Alice	Resident Evil (film series)	Milla Jovovich	2002–2017	
xXx / Xander Cage	XXX	Vin Diesel	2002–present	
Oh Dae-su	Oldboy	Choi Min-sik	2003	
The Bride	Kill Bill: Volume 1 Kill Bill: Volume 2	Uma Thurman	2003; 2004	
Willie Soke	Bad Santa; Bad Santa 2	Billy Bob Thornton	2003; 2016	
Jack Sparrow	Pirates of the Caribbean film series	Johnny Depp	2003–2017	
Richard	Dead Man's Shoes	Paddy Considine	2004	
Punisher / Frank Castle	The Punisher	Thomas Jane	2004	
Hellboy	Hellboy; Hellboy II: The Golden Army	Ron Perlman	2004; 2008	
John Kramer / Jigsaw	Saw franchise	Tobin Bell	2004–2023	
John Constantine	Constantine	Keanu Reeves	2005	
DJay	Hustle & Flow	Terrence Howard	2005	
King Kong	King Kong	Andy Serkis	2005	
John Wydell	The Devil's Rejects	William Forsythe	2005	
V	V for Vendetta	Hugo Weaving	2005	
Batman / Bruce Wayne	Dark Knight trilogy	Christian Bale	2005–2012	
Borat Sagdiyev	Borat; Borat Subsequent Moviefilm	Sacha Baron Cohen	2006; 2020	
Rehan Qadri Sr. / Khan	Fanaa	Aamir Khan	2006	
Colin Sullivan	The Departed	Matt Damon	2006	
Don	Don; Don 2	Shah Rukh Khan	2006; 2011	
Chev Chelios	Crank; Crank: High Voltage	Jason Statham	2006; 2009	
Robert Ford	The Assassination of Jesse James by the Coward Robert Ford	Casey Affleck	2007	
Daniel Plainview	There Will Be Blood	Daniel Day-Lewis	2007	
Bryan Mills	Taken	Liam Neeson	2008	
Jacques Mesrine	Mesrine	Vincent Cassel	2008	
Punisher / Frank Castle	Punisher: War Zone	Ray Stevenson	2008	
Loki	Marvel Cinematic Universe	Tom Hiddleston	2008–present	
Bucky Barnes	Marvel Cinematic Universe	Sebastian Stan	2008–present	
Ronnie Barnhardt	Observe and Report	Seth Rogen	2009	
Terence McDonagh	Bad Lieutenant: Port of Call New Orleans	Nicolas Cage	2009	
Sherlock Holmes	Sherlock Holmes; Sherlock Holmes: A Game of Shadows	Robert Downey Jr.	2009; 2011	
Mark Zuckerberg	The Social Network	Jesse Eisenberg	2010	
Steven Jay Russell	I Love You Phillip Morris	Jim Carrey	2010	
Sultan Mirza	Once Upon a Time in Mumbaai	Ajay Devgan	2010	
Hit-Girl / Mindy Macready	Kick-Ass; Kick-Ass 2	Chloë Grace Moretz	2010; 2013	
Machete	Machete; Machete Kills	Danny Trejo	2010; 2013	
Gru	Despicable Me	Steve Carell	2010–present	
Lisbeth Salander	The Girl with the Dragon Tattoo	Rooney Mara	2011	
The Driver	Drive	Ryan Gosling	2011	
Mavis Gary	Young Adult	Charlize Theron	2011	
Django	Django Unchained	Jamie Foxx	2012	
Barnabas Collins	Dark Shadows	Johnny Depp	2012	
Judge Dredd	Dredd	Karl Urban	2012	
Ralph	Wreck-it Ralph film series	John C. Reilly	2012	
Selina Kyle / Catwoman	The Dark Knight Rises	Anne Hathaway	2012	
Jack Reacher	Jack Reacher; Jack Reacher: Never Go Back	Tom Cruise	2012; 2016	
Parker	Parker	Jason Statham	2013	
Manya Surve	Shootout at Wadala	John Abraham	2013	
Monica	Shortcut Romeo	Ameesha Patel	2013	
Bruce Robertson	Filth	James McAvoy	2013	
Ron Woodroof	Dallas Buyers Club	Matthew McConaughey	2013	
Jordan Belfort	The Wolf of Wall Street	Leonardo DiCaprio	2013	
John Wick	John Wick	Keanu Reeves	2014–present	
Louis "Lou" Bloom	Nightcrawler	Jake Gyllenhaal	2014	
Abel Morales	A Most Violent Year	Oscar Isaac	2014	
Riggan Thomson	Birdman	Michael Keaton	2014	
Maleficent	Maleficent; Maleficent: Mistress of Evil	Angelina Jolie	2014; 2019	
Kylo Ren	Star Wars film series	Adam Driver	2015–2019	
Frank Martin	The Transporter film series	Ed Skrein	2015–present	
Katherine Lester	Lady Macbeth	Florence Pugh	2016	
Gloria	Colossal	Anne Hathaway	2016	
Wade Wilson / Deadpool	Deadpool; Deadpool 2 Deadpool & Wolverine	Ryan Reynolds	2016; 2018; 2024	
Harley Quinn	DC Extended Universe	Margot Robbie	2016–present	
Raees Alam	Raees	Shah Rukh Khan	2017	
Christine "Lady Bird" McPherson	Lady Bird	Saoirse Ronan	2017	
Eddie Brock / Venom	Venom; Venom: Let There Be Carnage; Venom: The Last Dance	Tom Hardy	2018; 2021; 2024	
Joker / Arthur Fleck	Joker	Joaquin Phoenix	2019	
Howard Ratner	Uncut Gems	Adam Sandler	2019	
Chen Kui-lin	The Pig, the Snake and the Pigeon	Ethan Ruan	2023	

== Comic books ==
Character	First appearance	Ref.
Sub-Mariner	1939 April (Motion Picture Funnies Weekly)	
Batman	1939 May (Detective Comics #27)	
Catwoman	1940 (Batman #1)	
Manhunter (Paul Kirk)	1941 January (Adventure Comics #58)	
Shade	1942 September (Flash Comics #33)	
Fritz the Cat	1959	
Hulk	1962 May (The Incredible Hulk #1)	
Iron Man	1963 March (Tales of Suspense #39)	
Magneto	1963 September (The X-Men #1)	
Juggernaut	1965 July (The X-Men #12)	
Jonah Hex	1972 March (All-Star Western #10)	
Ghost Rider	1972 August (Marvel Spotlight #5)	
Blade	1973 July (The Tomb of Dracula #10)	
Punisher	1974 February (The Amazing Spider-Man #129)	
Deathlok	1974 August (Astonishing Tales #25)	
Wolverine	1974 October (The Incredible Hulk #180)	
Moon Knight	1975 August (Werewolf by Night #32)	
Rocket Raccoon	1976 July (Marvel Preview #7)	
Judge Dredd	1977 March (2000 AD #2)	
Cerebus	1977 December (Cerebus the Aardvark #1)	
Black Cat	1979 July (The Amazing Spider-Man #179)	
Elektra	1981 January (Daredevil Vol. 1 #168)	
V	1982 March (Warrior #1)	
Snake Eyes	1982 June (G.I. Joe: A Real American Hero #1)	
Reuben Flagg	1983 October (American Flagg! #1)	
Lobo	1983 June (Omega Men #3)	
John Constantine	1985 June (The Saga of the Swamp Thing #37)	
Rorschach	1986 September (Watchmen #1)	
Venom (Eddie Brock)	1988 May (The Amazing Spider-Man #299)	
Cable	1990 March (The New Mutants #87)	
Deadpool	1991 February (The New Mutants #98)	
Marv	1991 April (The Hard Goodbye)	
Phoncible P. "Phoney" Bone	1991 July (Bone #1)	
Spawn	1992 May (Spawn #1)	
Doga	1993 (Curfew)	
Dwight	1993 November (A Dame to Kill For)	
King Mob	1994 September (The Invisibles #1)	
Jesse Custer	1995 April (Preacher #1)	
Johnny C	1995 August (Johnny the Homicidal Maniac #1)	
Spider Jerusalem	1997 July (Transmetropolitan #1)	
Red Hood (Jason Todd)	2005 (Batman #635)	

== Television ==
Character	TV show	Portrayed by	Year	Ref.
Catwoman	Batman	Julie Newmar	1966–1967	
Oscar the Grouch	Sesame Street	Caroll Spinney (1969–2018); Eric Jacobson (2015–present)	1969–present	
Erica Kane	All My Children	Susan Lucci	1970–2011	
John Kline	Gangsters	Maurice Colbourne	1975-1978	
Kerr Avon	Blake's 7	Paul Darrow	1978–1981	
Peter "Tucker" Jenkins	Grange Hill	Todd Carty	1978–1982; 2003; 2008	
Thomas Sullivan Magnum III	Magnum, P.I.	Tom Selleck	1980–1988	
Abby Fairgate	Knots Landing	Donna Mills	1980–1989	
Various generations of Edmund Blackadder	Blackadder	Rowan Atkinson	1983–1989	
Al Bundy	Married... with Children	Ed O'Neill	1987–1997	
George Costanza	Seinfeld	Jason Alexander	1989–1998	
Todd Manning	One Life to Live	Roger Howarth	1992–1995; 1996–1998; 2000–2003; 2011–2013	
Eric Cartman	South Park	Trey Parker	1992–present	
Tommy Oliver	Mighty Morphin Power Rangers	Jason David Frank	1993–1995	
Jim Profit	Profit	Adrian Pasdar	1996	
Angel	Buffy the Vampire Slayer; Angel	David Boreanaz	1997–2003; 1999–2004	
Spike	Buffy the Vampire Slayer; Angel	James Marsters	1997–2003; 1999–2004	
Lisa Fowler	EastEnders	Lucy Benjamin	1998–2003; 2010; 2017; 2019–2020; 2023	
Tony Soprano	The Sopranos	James Gandolfini	1999–2007	
Bender	Futurama	John DiMaggio	1999–present	
Cole Turner	Charmed	Julian McMahon	2000–2003; 2005	
Larry David	Curb Your Enthusiasm	Larry David	2000–2024	
David Brent	The Office (UK)	Ricky Gervais	2001–2003	
Jack Bauer	24	Kiefer Sutherland	2001–2010, 2014	
Jimmy McNulty	The Wire	Dominic West	2002–2008	
Stringer Bell	The Wire	Idris Elba	2002–2008	
Bubbles / Reginald Cousins	The Wire	Andre Royo	2002–2008	
Omar Little	The Wire	Michael K. Williams	2002–2008	
Vic Mackey	The Shield	Michael Chiklis	2002–2008	
Shego	Kim Possible	Nicole Sullivan	2002–2007	
Julie Cooper	The O.C.	Melinda Clarke	2003–2007	
Brooke Davis	One Tree Hill	Sophia Bush	2003–2012	
Al Swearengen	Deadwood	Ian McShane	2004–2006	
Tommy Gavin	Rescue Me	Denis Leary	2004–2011	
Veronica Mars	Veronica Mars	Kristen Bell	2004–2007; 2019	
James "Sawyer" Ford	Lost	Josh Holloway	2004–2010	
Gregory House	House	Hugh Laurie	2004–2012	
Zuko	Avatar: The Last Airbender	Dante Basco	2005–2008	
Dwight Schrute	The Office	Rainn Wilson	2005–2013	
Charlie Kelly	It's Always Sunny in Philadelphia	Charlie Day	2005–present	
Dennis Reynolds	It's Always Sunny in Philadelphia	Glenn Howerton	2005–present	
Ronald "Mac" McDonald	It's Always Sunny in Philadelphia	Rob McElhenney	2005–present	
Deandra "Sweet Dee" Reynolds	It's Always Sunny in Philadelphia	Kaitlin Olson	2005–present	
Frank Reynolds	It's Always Sunny in Philadelphia	Danny DeVito	2005–present	
Nancy Botwin	Weeds	Mary-Louise Parker	2005–2012	
Atia of the Julii	Rome	Polly Walker	2005–2007	
Theodore "T-Bag" Bagwell	Prison Break	Robert Knepper	2005–2009, 2017	
Dean Winchester	Supernatural	Jensen Ackles	2005–2020	
Sam Winchester	Supernatural	Jared Padalecki	2005–2020	
Castiel	Supernatural	Misha Collins	2005–2020	
Barney Stinson	How I Met Your Mother	Neil Patrick Harris	2005–2014	
Ben Linus	Lost	Michael Emerson	2006–2010	
Noah Bennet	Heroes; Heroes Reborn	Jack Coleman	2006–2010; 2015	
Dexter Morgan	Dexter; Dexter: New Blood; Dexter: Original Sin; Dexter: Resurrection	Michael C. Hall	2006–2013, 2021–2022, 2024–present	
Jack Donaghy	30 Rock	Alec Baldwin	2006–2013, 2020	
Jenna Maroney	30 Rock	Jane Krakowski	2006–2013, 2020	
Tony Stonem	Skins	Nicholas Hoult	2007–2008	
Patricia "Patty" Hewes	Damages	Glenn Close	2007–2012	
Chuck Bass	Gossip Girl	Ed Westwick	2007–2012	
Blair Waldorf	Gossip Girl	Leighton Meester	2007–2012	
Don Draper	Mad Men	Jon Hamm	2007–2015	
Pete Campbell	Mad Men	Vincent Kartheiser	2007–2015	
Hank Moody	Californication	David Duchovny	2007–2014	
Dr. Heinz Doofenshmirtz	Phineas and Ferb; Phineas and Ferb the Movie: Across the 2nd Dimension; Milo Murphy's Law; Phineas and Ferb the Movie: Candace Against the Universe	Dan Povenmire	2007–2015, 2025–present 2011; 2017–2019; 2020	
Sheldon Cooper	The Big Bang Theory	Jim Parsons	2007–2019	
Alex Russo	Wizards of Waverly Place; Wizards of Waverly Place: The Movie; The Wizards Return: Alex vs. Alex; Wizards Beyond Waverly Place	Selena Gomez	2007–2012; 2009; 2013; 2024–2026	
Walter White	Breaking Bad	Bryan Cranston	2008–2013	
Skyler White	Breaking Bad	Anna Gunn	2008–2013	
Jesse Pinkman	Breaking Bad	Aaron Paul	2008–2013	
Jackson "Jax" Teller	Sons of Anarchy	Charlie Hunnam	2008–2014	
Gemma Teller Morrow	Sons of Anarchy	Katey Sagal	2008–2014	
Kenny Powers	Eastbound & Down	Danny McBride	2009–2013	
April Ludgate	Parks and Recreation	Aubrey Plaza	2009–2015; 2020	
Saul Goodman	Breaking Bad; Better Call Saul	Bob Odenkirk	2009–2013; 2015–2022	
Rachel Berry	Glee	Lea Michele	2009–2015	
Jackie Peyton	Nurse Jackie	Edie Falco	2009–2015	
Damon Salvatore	The Vampire Diaries	Ian Somerhalder	2009–2017	
Boyd Crowder	Justified	Walton Goggins	2010–2015	
Mona Vanderwaal	Pretty Little Liars	Janel Parrish	2010–2017	
Sherlock Holmes	Sherlock	Benedict Cumberbatch	2010–2017	
Nucky Thompson	Boardwalk Empire	Steve Buscemi	2010–2014	
Daryl Dixon	The Walking Dead	Norman Reedus	2010–present	
Jaime Lannister	Game of Thrones	Nikolaj Coster-Waldau	2011–2019	
Tyrion Lannister	Game of Thrones	Peter Dinklage	2011–2019	
Arya Stark	Game of Thrones	Maisie Williams	2011–2019	
Nicholas Brody	Homeland	Damian Lewis	2011–2014	
Evil Queen / Regina Mills / Roni	Once Upon a Time	Lana Parrilla	2011–2018	
Rumpelstiltkin / Mr. Gold	Once Upon a Time	Robert Carlyle	2011–2018	
Oliver Queen / Green Arrow	Arrow	Stephen Amell	2012–2020	
Elizabeth Jennings	The Americans	Keri Russell	2013–2018	
Philip Jennings	The Americans	Matthew Rhys	2013–2018	
Frank Underwood	House of Cards	Kevin Spacey	2013–2018	
Raymond "Ray" Donovan	Ray Donovan	Liev Schreiber	2013–2018	
Rosa Diaz	Brooklyn Nine-Nine	Stephanie Beatriz	2013–2021	
Gina Linetti	Brooklyn Nine-Nine	Chelsea Peretti	2013–2021	
Max Thunderman	The Thundermans; The Thundermans Return; The Thundermans: Undercover; Clash of the Thundermans	Jack Griffo	2013–2018; 2024; 2025; 2026	
Rick Sanchez	Rick and Morty	Justin Roiland (2013–2022); Ian Cardoni (2023–present)	2013–present	
John Constantine	Constantine	Matt Ryan	2014–2015	
Bojack Horseman	Bojack Horseman	Will Arnett	2014–2020	
Kim Wexler	Better Call Saul	Rhea Seehorn	2015–2022	
Nacho Varga	Better Call Saul	Michael Mando	2015–2022	
Elliot Alderson	Mr. Robot	Rami Malek	2015–2019	
Frank Castle / The Punisher	Marvel's The Punisher	Jon Bernthal	2017–2019	
Trevor Belmont	Castlevania	Richard Armitage	2017–2021	
Martin "Marty" Byrde	Ozark	Jason Bateman	2017–2022	
Eve Polastri	Killing Eve	Sandra Oh	2018–2022	
Oksana Astankova / Villanelle	Killing Eve	Jodie Comer	2018–2022	
Catra	She-Ra and the Princesses of Power	AJ Michalka	2018–2020	
Billy Butcher	The Boys	Karl Urban	2019–present	
The Mandalorian	The Mandalorian	Pedro Pascal	2019–present	
Seraphim	Blood of Zeus	Elias Toufexis	2020–2025	
Seong Gi-hun	Squid Game	Lee Jung-jae	2021–2025	
Wednesday Addams	Wednesday	Jenna Ortega	2022-present	

== Anime and manga ==
Character	Work	Year	Ref.
Lupin III	Lupin III	1967–present	
Skull Man / Ryūsei Chisato	Skull Man	1970–2002	
Ogami Ittō	Lone Wolf and Cub	1970–1976	
Captain Harlock	Space Pirate Captain Harlock	1977–1979	
Amuro Ray	Mobile Suit Gundam	1979–1980	
Char Aznable	Mobile Suit Gundam	1979–1980	
Vegeta	Dragon Ball Z	1989–present	
Guts	Berserk	1989–present	
Orphen	Sorcerous Stabber Orphen	1994–present	
Gene Starwind	Outlaw Star	1996–1999	
Inuyasha	Inuyasha	1996–2008	
Kikyo	Inuyasha	1996–2008	
Alucard	Hellsing	1997–2008	
Ashura Doji	One Piece	1997–present	
Bartholomew Kuma	One Piece	1997–present	
"Big Gang" Bege	One Piece	1997–present	
Denjiro	One Piece	1997–present	
Eustass Kid	One Piece	1997–present	
Lola the Proposer	One Piece	1997–present	
Nico Robin	One Piece	1997–present	
Roronoa Zoro	One Piece	1997–present	
Smoker	One Piece	1997–present	
Trafalgar Law	One Piece	1997–present	
Spike Spiegel	Cowboy Bebop	1998–1999	
Jet Black	Cowboy Bebop	1998–1999	
Faye Valentine	Cowboy Bebop	1998–1999	
Sasuke Uchiha	Naruto	1999–2014	
Caiman	Dorohedoro	2000–2020	
Scar	Fullmetal Alchemist	2001–2010	
Ichigo Kurosaki	Bleach	2001–2016	
Grimmjow Jeagerjaques	Bleach	2001–2016	
Revy / Rebecca Lee	Black Lagoon	2002–present	
Lucy	Elfen Lied	2002–2005	
Vino / Claire Stanfield	Baccano!	2003–present	
Tokiko Tsumura	Buso Renkin	2003–2005	
Light Yagami	Death Note	2003–2006	
L Lawliet	Death Note	2003–2006	
Mello / Mihael Keehl	Death Note	2003–2006	
Mugen	Samurai Champloo	2004	
Jin	Samurai Champloo	2004	
Accelerator	A Certain Magical Index	2004	
Thorfinn	Vinland Saga	2005–2025	
Askeladd	Vinland Saga	2005–2025	
Yuno Gasai	Future Diary	2006–2010	
Sebastian Michaelis	Black Butler	2006–present	
Ciel Phantomhive	Black Butler	2006–present	
Lelouch Lamperouge	Code Geass	2006–2008	
Kiritsugu Emiya	Fate/Zero	2006–2007	
Viral	Gurren Lagann	2007	
Lordgenome	Gurren Lagann	2007	
Hei	Darker than Black	2007	
Eren Yeager	Attack on Titan	2009–2021	
Akame	Akame ga Kill!	2010–2019	
Homura Akemi	Puella Magi Madoka Magica	2011	
Kyoko Sakura	Puella Magi Madoka Magica	2011	
Worick Arcangelo	Gangsta	2011–present	
Nicolas Brown	Gangsta	2011–present	
Hachiman Hikigaya	My Youth Romantic Comedy Is Wrong, as I Expected	2011–2021	
Ken Kaneki	Tokyo Ghoul	2011–2014	
Saitama	One-Punch Man	2012–present	
Osamu Dazai	Bungo Stray Dogs	2012–present	
Satsuki Kiryuin	Kill la Kill	2013–2014	
Dandy	Space Dandy	2013–2014	
Dynamight / Katsuki Bakugo	My Hero Academia	2014–2024	
Endeavor / Enji Todoroki	My Hero Academia	2014–2024	
Lady Nagant	My Hero Academia	2014–2024	
Ange	Cross Ange	2014–2015	
McGillis Fareed	Mobile Suit Gundam: Iron-Blooded Orphans	2015—2017	
Angelo Lagusa	91 Days	2016	
William James Moriarty	Moriarty the Patriot	2016–present	
Tanya Degurechaff	The Saga of Tanya the Evil	2017–present	
Fate Graphite	Berserk of Gluttony	2017–present	
Rachel "Ray" Gardner	Angels of Death	2018	
Maki Zen'in	Jujutsu Kaisen	2018–present	
Cid Kagenou / Shadow / Minoru Kageno	The Eminence in Shadow	2018–present	
Adonis	The Kingdoms of Ruin	2019–present	

== Video games ==
Character	Work	Year	Ref.
George	Rampage	1986–present	
Ralph	Rampage	1986–present	
Lizzie	Rampage	1986–present	
Rick Taylor	Splatterhouse	1988–2010	
Keef	Keef the Thief	1989	
Duke Nukem	Duke Nukem	1991–2011	
Wario	Wario	1992–present	
Meta Knight	Kirby	1993–present	
Zero	Mega Man	1993–present	
Nina Williams	Tekken	1994	
Sweet Tooth	Twisted Metal	1995–present	
Kain	Legacy of Kain	1996–2003	
Raziel	Legacy of Kain	1996–2003	
Alucard	Castlevania: Symphony of the Night	1997	
Ada Wong	Resident Evil	1998–present	
Garrett	Thief: The Dark Project	1998	
Waluigi	Mario	2000–present	
Agent 47	Hitman	2000–present	
Conker the Squirrel	Conker's Bad Fur Day	2001	
Claude	Grand Theft Auto III	2001	
Shadow the Hedgehog	Sonic the Hedgehog	2001–present	
Dante	Devil May Cry	2001–present	
Captain Olimar	Pikmin	2001–present	
Jak	Jak and Daxter	2001–2009	
Max Payne	Max Payne	2001–2012	
Arthas Menethil	Warcraft III: Reign of Chaos	2002	
Tommy Vercetti	Grand Theft Auto: Vice City	2002	
Rayne	BloodRayne	2002	
Sly Cooper	Sly Cooper	2002–2013	
Nicholas Kang	True Crime: Streets of LA	2003	
James Earl Cash	Manhunt	2003	
Torque	The Suffering	2004	
Red Harlow	Red Dead Revolver	2004	
Carl Johnson	Grand Theft Auto: San Andreas	2004	
Mattias Nilsson	Mercenaries: Playground of Destruction	2005	
Jennifer Mui	Mercenaries: Playground of Destruction	2005	
Chris Jacobs	Mercenaries: Playground of Destruction	2005	
Jericho Cross	Darkwatch	2005	
Wander	Shadow of the Colossus	2005	
Kratos	God of War	2005–present	
Kazuma Kiryu	Yakuza	2005–present	
Johnny Gat	Saints Row	2006–2015	
Marcus Fenix	Gears of War	2006–present	
Jimmy Hopkins	Bully	2006	
Jackie Estacado	The Darkness	2007	
Altaïr Ibn-LaʼAhad	Assassin's Creed	2007	
Geralt of Rivia	The Witcher	2007–present	
Ethan Thomas	Condemned 2: Bloodshot	2008	
Niko Bellic	Grand Theft Auto IV	2008	
Starkiller	Star Wars: The Force Unleashed	2008	
Johnny Klebitz	Grand Theft Auto IV: The Lost and Damned	2009	
Jack	MadWorld	2009	
Stone Cold Steve Austin	WWE Legends of WrestleMania	2009	
Riddick	The Chronicles of Riddick: Assault on Dark Athena	2009	
Cole McGrath	Infamous	2009	
Alex Mercer	Prototype	2009	
Luis Fernando Lopez	Grand Theft Auto IV: The Ballad of Gay Tony	2009	
Bayonetta	Bayonetta	2009–present	
War	Darksiders	2010	
John Marston	Red Dead Redemption	2010	
Adam "Kane" Marcus	Kane & Lynch 2: Dog Days	2010	
James Seth Lynch	Kane & Lynch 2: Dog Days	2010	
Paxton Fettel	F.E.A.R. 3	2011	
Death	Darksiders II	2012	
Joel	The Last of Us	2013	
Ellie	The Last of Us	2013	
Michael de Santa	Grand Theft Auto V	2013	
Trevor Philips	Grand Theft Auto V	2013	
Shay Patrick Cormac	Assassin's Creed Rogue	2014	
Soldier: 76	Overwatch	2016–present	
A2	Nier: Automata	2017	
Arthur Morgan	Red Dead Redemption 2	2018	
Jason Duval	Grand Theft Auto VI	2026	
Lucia Caminos	Grand Theft Auto VI	2026	
