= Ripley Under Ground (film) =

- Film poster
- Directed by: Roger Spottiswoode
- Written by: W. Blake Herron; Donald E. Westlake
- Based on: Ripley Under Ground by Patricia Highsmith
- Produced by: Antoine de Clermont-Tonnerre; Marco Mehlitz; Michael Ohoven; Stephen Ujlaki; William Vince
- Starring: Barry Pepper; Jacinda Barrett; Tom Wilkinson; Willem Dafoe; Alan Cumming; Claire Forlani; Ian Hart
- Cinematography: Paul Sarossy
- Edited by: Michel Arcand
- Music by: Jeff Danna
- Distributed by: Universum Film
- Release date: November 6, 2005 (AFI)
- Running time: 101 minutes
- Countries: Germany; France; United Kingdom
- Language: English

Ripley Under Ground is a 2005 German-British-French crime thriller film directed by Roger Spottiswoode and based on the 1970 second novel in Patricia Highsmith's Tom Ripley series. It stars Barry Pepper as Ripley and features Willem Dafoe, Alan Cumming, and Tom Wilkinson in supporting roles.

== Plot summary ==
Tom Ripley's friend Philip Derwatt, a successful young artist, is killed in a car accident. Ripley, along with Jeff Constant, Derwatt's gallerist; Bernard Sayles, another artist; and Cynthia, Derwatt's girlfriend, concoct a scheme in which Bernard forges more of Derwatt's paintings, making a great deal of money. They hide Derwatt's body in a freezer.

Ripley begins a relationship with Héloïse Plisson, who lives in a château near Paris, "Belle Ombre", with her father Antoine. Antoine investigates Ripley and disapproves of his shady past. Ripley gives Héloïse a tomato plant.

An art collector, Neil Murchison, complains that a painting he bought by "Derwatt" is a fake. Ripley forges a letter by Derwatt, but Murchison is unconvinced. Murchison travels to Belle Ombre to visit Derwatt, who is impersonated by Ripley. However, Murchison recognises Ripley. They fight, Murchison falls, hits his head, and dies. His toupee falls off and is grabbed by Héloïse's dogs. Ripley buries Murchison's body, leaves his belongings on a train, and rushes to clean up the blood before Héloïse and her father return.

A detective, John Webster, visits Belle Ombre. He obtains Ripley's fingerprints by subterfuge, in order to investigate him, but does not notice the dogs returning with the toupee, which Héloïse disposes of.

An increasingly unstable Bernard threatens to expose Ripley. Bernard tells Webster the location of Murchison's body, but Ripley has already moved it to underneath the tomato plant. Back in England, Bernard takes Webster to the cottage where Derwatt's body was kept in the freezer, but Ripley has already removed it to his car.

Bernard abducts Ripley at gunpoint. Ripley crashes the car, then places Derwatt's body in the driver's seat and sets the car on fire.

At Belle Ombre, Ripley and Héloïse are about to get married. Webster has the tomato plant dug up, searching for Murchison's body. Antoine's suspicions were aroused by Ripley's interest in gardening. However, Héloïse has already moved the body. At the wedding, Ripley gives Héloïse a ring he stole from Derwatt. Héloïse gives him a ring from Murchison's corpse. As they drive away to their honeymoon, Héloïse proposes murdering her father to inherit his estate.

== Cast ==
- Barry Pepper as Tom Ripley
- Willem Dafoe as Neil Murchison
- Alan Cumming as Jeff Constant
- Tom Wilkinson as John Webster
- Jacinda Barrett as Héloïse Plisson
- Claire Forlani as Cynthia
- Ian Hart as Bernard Sayles
- Douglas Henshall as Philip Derwatt
- François Marthouret as Antoine Plisson
- Mika Simmons as Sandy

== Release and reception ==
The film was produced under the working titles "White On White" and "Ripley's Art", but it was released as Ripley Under Ground. It was produced during July and August 2003, but was not released until two years later. The film was shown on the 2005 AFI Fest on 6 November 2005. It was released on DVD on 24 July 2007 in the Netherlands. Box office figures are not available for the film.

Critical reviews have been scarce, owing to the smaller release. Variety's review was less than positive, saying: "Although it strives to push Patricia Highsmith's best-known bad man in a snarky direction, Ripley Under Ground is too fidgety and unsure to settle on a sustained tone and ends up in a no man's land between hysterical satire and sleek Euro thriller. As previous filmic Ripleys demonstrated, from Purple Noon and The American Friend to The Talented Mr. Ripley and Ripley's Game, it's all in the casting, and the talented Mr. Barry Pepper is not capable of pulling off the demonically complicated and murderous con artist."

The film is the least well known Ripley adaptation.
