= The Talented Mr. Ripley =

1955 novel by Patricia Highsmith

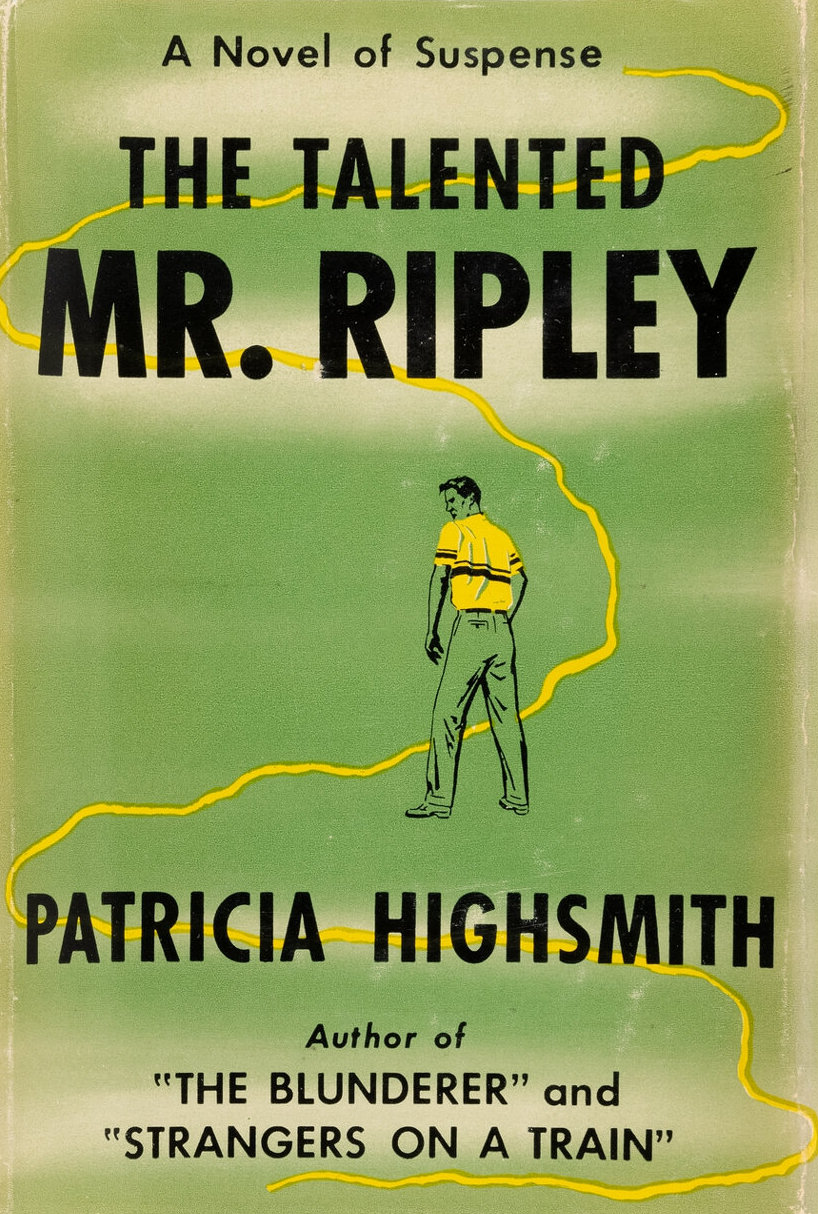
- First US edition
- Author: Patricia Highsmith
- Language: English
- Series: Ripliad
- Genre: Crime novel
- Publisher: • Coward-McCann (United States) • Cresset Press (United Kingdom)
- Publication date: November 30, 1955
- Publication place: United States
- Media type: Print (hardback, paperback)
- Pages: 252
- OCLC: 2529516
- Followed by: Ripley Under Ground

The Talented Mr. Ripley is a 1955 psychological thriller novel by Patricia Highsmith. The novel introduced the character of con man Tom Ripley, whom Highsmith wrote about in four subsequent books, all together forming The Ripliad. Its numerous film and television adaptations include Purple Noon (1960), starring Alain Delon, The Talented Mr. Ripley (1999), starring Matt Damon, and the 2024 series Ripley, starring Andrew Scott.

== Plot ==
Tom Ripley is a young man struggling to make a living in New York City by any means, including a series of small-time confidence scams. He is approached by shipping magnate Herbert Greenleaf to travel to Mongibello in Italy, to persuade Greenleaf's errant son, Dickie, to return to the United States and join the family business. Ripley agrees, exaggerating his friendship with Dickie, a half-remembered acquaintance.

Shortly after his arrival in Italy, Ripley contrives to meet Dickie and his friend, Marge Sherwood. Dickie allows Ripley to stay with him in his summer home. As they spend time together, Marge feels left out. Soon after Ripley arrives, Freddie Miles, a school friend of Dickie's, visits the summer home. Ripley immediately dislikes Freddie. Dickie, concerned about Marge's feelings, becomes more attentive to her, and allows the relationship to become romantic. Ripley, jealous, dresses in Dickie's clothing and practices his mannerisms. Dickie walks in on him and reacts with shock and confusion.

Ripley senses that Dickie has begun to tire of him, resenting his constant presence and growing personal dependence. Ripley has indeed become obsessed with Dickie, which is further reinforced by his desire to imitate and maintain the wealthy lifestyle Dickie has afforded him. As a gesture to Ripley, Dickie agrees to travel with him on a short holiday to San Remo. Sensing that he is about to cut him loose, Ripley decides to murder Dickie and assume his identity. When the two set sail in a rented boat, Ripley beats him to death with an oar, dumps his anchor-weighted body into the water and scuttles the boat.

Ripley assumes Dickie's identity, living off his trust fund and forging communications to Marge to assure her that Dickie has dumped her. Ripley forges checks and changes his appearance to better resemble Dickie. Freddie encounters Ripley at what he supposes to be Dickie's apartment in Rome and suspects something is wrong. When Freddie confronts him, Ripley kills him with an ashtray in the apartment. He disposes of the body on the outskirts of Rome, attempting to make the police believe that Freddie was killed in a robbery.

Ripley enters a cat-and-mouse game with the Italian police but keeps himself safe by restoring his own identity and moving to Venice. In succession, Marge, Dickie's father, and an American private detective confront Ripley, who suggests to them that Dickie was depressed and may have committed suicide. Marge stays for a while at Ripley's rented house in Venice, where she discovers Dickie's rings in Ripley's possession. Panicked, Ripley contemplates murdering Marge, but she is saved when she says that if Dickie gave his rings to Ripley, then he probably meant to kill himself.

Ripley travels to Greece and resigns himself to eventually being caught. However, he discovers that the Greenleaf family has accepted that Dickie is dead and that they have transferred his inheritance to Ripley, in accordance with a will forged by Ripley on Dickie's typewriter. Ripley is happily rich, but wonders if he will forever worry that he is about to be caught.

== Reception ==
In 1956, the Mystery Writers of America nominated the novel for the Edgar Allan Poe Award for Best Novel. In 1957, the novel won the Grand Prix de Littérature Policière as best international crime novel. On 5 November 2019, the BBC listed The Talented Mr. Ripley on its list of the 100 most inspiring novels.

== Adaptations ==
=== Television ===
- The novel was first adapted for a January 1956 episode of the anthology U.S. television series Studio One.
- Ripley, a series with Andrew Scott in the title role, started airing in April 2024. Announced in September 2019, it was originally intended for Showtime, which commissioned an eight-episode first season, to be written and directed by Steven Zaillian who had pitched the series to the network. However, the series was moved to Netflix in February 2023.

=== Film ===
- Plein Soleil (originally), also known as Purple Noon (1960), directed by René Clément, stars Alain Delon as Ripley and Maurice Ronet as Greenleaf.
- The 1999 film version, directed by Anthony Minghella, stars Matt Damon as Ripley, Jude Law as Dickie and Gwyneth Paltrow as Marge.
- The 2012 Indian Tamil language adaptation Naan is based on both the novel and its 1999 adaptation.

=== Radio ===
- The 2009 BBC Radio 4 adaptation of the Ripley novels stars Ian Hart as Ripley, Stephen Hogan as Dickie, and Barbara Barnes as Marge.

=== Audiobook ===
- In 2007, an unabridged audiobook was published, narrated by David Menkin.

=== Theatre ===
- In 2010, the novel was adapted into a stage production at Northampton's Royal Theatre starring Michelle Ryan.
- In 2025, Sydney Theatre Company presented an adaptation written by Joanna Murray-Smith, starring Will McDonald.

=== Fiction ===
- E. Lockheart's 2017 young adult novel Genuine Fraud is a retelling of the novel.

== See also ==
The "Ripliad":

- Ripley Under Ground (1970)
- Ripley's Game (1974)
- The Boy Who Followed Ripley (1980)
- Ripley Under Water (1991)
