= Ripley Under Water =

1991 novel by Patricia Highsmith

- First edition (UK)
- Author: Patricia Highsmith
- Cover artist: Elspeth Ross
- Language: English
- Series: Ripliad
- Genre: Crime novel
- Publisher: Bloomsbury (UK) & Alfred A. Knopf (USA)
- Publication date: October 3, 1991
- Publication place: United States
- Media type: Print (hardback, paperback)
- Pages: 256 pp
- ISBN: 0-7475-1004-0
- OCLC: 26356697
- Preceded by: The Boy Who Followed Ripley

Ripley Under Water is a 1991 psychological thriller by Patricia Highsmith, the last of five novels featuring Tom Ripley, "an intelligent, cultured gentleman who dabbles in art, music and, occasionally, murder."

== Synopsis ==
Tom Ripley spends his days tending his garden and playing the harpsichord at his home near Fontainebleau. He worries about the appearance of an American couple in his village. The husband eventually introduces himself as David Pritchard and invites Ripley to his rented house. Pritchard and his wife Janice are attracted to the artificial pond in front of the house. Janice strikes Ripley as a victim of abuse, and the couple argue openly during his visit.

Ripley soon receives a taunting call from "Dickie Greenleaf," the first person he murdered. When Ripley and his wife Heloïse travel to Tangier, Pritchard follows them. Ripley lures Pritchard to an isolated café, where Pritchard reveals his intention to torment Ripley. He also hints that Ripley's victims are helping with the effort. In a rage, Ripley beats Pritchard but stops short of killing him.

Ripley dwells on his past murders, such as that of Thomas Murchison as the result of an art forgery scheme. Pritchard is in touch with Murchison's widow and suspects Ripley murdered her husband. He starts dredging local canals and rivers in search of Murchison's corpse. When he finds it, he leaves the headless remains on Ripley's doorstep. Ripley takes a ring off the corpse that could identify it as Murchison's. He returns the corpse to the pond in front of the Pritchards' house. When they investigate the splash, both fall in and are unable to escape before drowning.

The police are perplexed by the bones and the double drowning. They interrogate Ripley because Pritchard told Mrs. Murchison he found her husband's body and would deliver it to Ripley. Ripley feigns confusion over why Pritchard would do such a thing. He charms the police into sharing a drink with him before leaving. The next day, Ripley throws Murchison's ring into a nearby river.

== Reception ==
The New York Times review concluded, "This is the least good of the Ripley books, one in which the distinctly undramatic climax suggests that Patricia Highsmith is no longer much involved with her criminal creation...But the title is an ingenious joke, for in the end it is not Ripley who is ever under water." James Campbell noted that the novel "takes about 100 pages to get going, and when it does, the pace, paradoxically, seems to slacken."

== Adaptations ==
=== Radio ===
The 2009 BBC Radio 4 adaptation stars Ian Hart as Ripley, Helen Longworth as Heloise, William Hope as David Pritchard, Janice Acquah as Janice Pritchard and Caroline Guthrie as Madame Annette.
