= The American Friend =

- German film poster
- German: Der amerikanische Freund
- Directed by: Wim Wenders
- Written by: Wim Wenders
- Based on: Ripley's Game; 1974 novel by Patricia Highsmith
- Produced by: Wim Wenders
- Starring: Dennis Hopper; Bruno Ganz; Lisa Kreuzer; Gérard Blain
- Cinematography: Robby Müller
- Edited by: Peter Przygodda
- Music by: Jürgen Knieper
- Production companies: Road Movies Filmproduktion; Wim Wenders Productions; Les Films du Losange; Westdeutscher Rundfunk
- Distributed by: Filmverlag der Autoren
- Release dates: 26 March 1977 (Cannes); 24 June 1977 (Berlin)
- Running time: 127 minutes
- Countries: West Germany; France
- Languages: German; English
- Budget: 3 million DEM

The American Friend (German: Der amerikanische Freund) is a 1977 neo-noir film written and directed by Wim Wenders, adapted from the 1974 novel Ripley's Game by Patricia Highsmith. It stars Dennis Hopper as career-criminal Tom Ripley and Bruno Ganz as Jonathan Zimmermann, a terminally ill picture framer whom Ripley coaxes into becoming an assassin. The film uses an unusual "natural" language concept: Zimmermann speaks German with his family and his doctor, but English with Ripley and while visiting Paris.

== Plot ==
Tom Ripley is a rich American living in Hamburg, Germany. He is involved in an artwork forgery scheme, in which he drives up auction prices of supposedly newly found—but really newly produced—paintings by an artist who has faked his own death. At an auction he is introduced to Jonathan Zimmermann, a picture framer who has framed one of the fakes in good faith and is dying of leukemia. Zimmermann refuses to shake Ripley's hand when introduced, coldly saying, "I've heard of you,” before walking away.

Raoul Minot, a French criminal, asks Ripley to murder an American gangster. Ripley declines, but, to get even for Zimmermann's slight, suggests Minot use Zimmermann for the job. Ripley spreads rumors that Zimmermann's illness has suddenly worsened, and Minot offers Zimmermann a great deal of money to kill the gangster. Zimmermann initially turns Minot down, but fearing that he might not have long to live, he joins Minot in France to get a second medical opinion. Minot has the results falsified to make Zimmermann expect the worst, and so Zimmermann agrees to shoot the gangster in a Paris Métro station to provide for his wife Marianne and his son Daniel. Ripley visits Zimmermann in his shop before and after the shooting, ostensibly to get a picture framed. Zimmermann is unaware of Ripley's involvement in the murder plot, and the two begin to form a bond after Zimmermann apologizes for being rude to Ripley when they first met.

Minot visits Ripley to report his satisfaction with Zimmermann's performance in the murder. Ripley, who has grown to like Zimmermann, is appalled when Minot wants Zimmermann to kill another American gangster in order to trigger a gang war among his rivals. This time, however, he will be on an intercity express train, and using a garrote. This gangster nearly overpowers Zimmermann, but Ripley appears out of the shadows and saves Zimmermann. He and Ripley jointly execute the target, and throw his body and a bodyguard from the train. Back in Hamburg, Ripley confesses to suggesting Zimmermann to Minot. When Zimmermann offers him the money for the second hit, he declines and asks Zimmermann not to divulge his involvement.

Leading a double life causes tension in Zimmermann's marriage, as Marianne does not believe his cover stories of traveling and getting paid for experimental treatments. Marianne eventually leaves with Daniel, causing him to collapse. Minot arrives to find out if Zimmermann knows why his flat was recently bombed. When Zimmermann mentions that "we" killed the man on the train, Minot suspects Ripley has turned on him.

Zimmermann calls Ripley, who takes Zimmermann to his mansion to wait for the assassins that he expects will soon appear. He and Zimmermann ambush and kill the American gangsters that arrive. Minot, who has been captured and beaten by the Americans, escapes in the chaos. Ripley piles the bodies into the ambulance the gangsters brought, but before he and Zimmermann can leave to dispose of them, Marianne arrives and tells Zimmermann that the French medical reports are fake. Ripley says there will be plenty of time to settle everything later, but he and Zimmermann could use her help with their current situation. The trio head to the sea, Ripley in the ambulance, and Marianne driving her exhausted husband in their car. On an isolated beach, Ripley douses the ambulance with gasoline and sets it on fire. Zimmermann gets in the driver's seat of his car and speeds away with Marianne, abandoning Ripley. Moments later, he blacks out and dies at the wheel and the car goes out of control, but Marianne pulls the emergency brake and survives. At the beach, Ripley says to himself, "Oh well. We made it anyway, Jonathan. Be careful."

== Cast ==
- Dennis Hopper as Tom Ripley
- Bruno Ganz as Jonathan Zimmermann
- Lisa Kreuzer as Marianne Zimmermann, Jonathan's wife
- Gérard Blain as Raoul Minot, a French gangster
- Nicholas Ray as "Derwatt", an artist
- Samuel Fuller as The American, a gangster
- Peter Lilienthal as Marcangelo, the gangster killed on the train
- Daniel Schmid as Igraham, the gangster killed in the subway
- Sandy Whitelaw as Doctor in Paris
- Jean Eustache as Friendly Man, who bandages Jonathan's head
- Lou Castel as Rodolphe, Minot's henchman
- Andreas Dedecke as Daniel Zimmermann, Jonathan and Marianne's son
- David Blue as Allan Winter, who buys the painting at the auction
- Stefan Lennert as Auctioneer
- Rudolf Schündler as Gantner, Marianne's boss at the auction house
- Gerty Molzen as Old Lady, a customer of Jonathan's framing business
- Heinz Joachim Klein as Dr. Gabriel
- Heinrich Marmann as Man on the Train with a dog
- Satya De La Manitou as Angie, The American's henchman
- Axel Schiessler as Lippo, Marcangelo's bodyguard
- Adolf Hansen as Conductor
- Rosemarie Heinikel as Mona, a woman involved with The American

== Production ==
Wenders was a fan of Patricia Highsmith and wanted to make a film based on one of her novels, especially The Cry of the Owl or The Tremor of Forgery. When he learned that the rights to these novels, and Highsmith's others, had been sold, Highsmith offered him the unpublished manuscript of Ripley's Game, which was published in 1974. Although he did not have the rights to do so, Wenders also incorporated elements from the previous Ripley novel, Ripley Under Ground.

Disliking the title Ripley's Game, Wenders shot the film under the title Framed. Another title considered was Rule Without Exception. Wenders credits Hopper's performance and onscreen relationship with Ganz with inspiring the title The American Friend.

Initially, Wenders wanted to cast John Cassavetes as Ripley, but he declined, suggesting Hopper for the part. After casting Hopper, an experienced director, Wenders decided to cast all of the gangster roles with directors, including Gérard Blain, Samuel Fuller, Peter Lilienthal, and Daniel Schmid. Nicholas Ray was cast as the artist, and Jean Eustache was cast as a friendly Frenchman.

== Reception ==
On review aggregator website Rotten Tomatoes, 88% of 25 critics' reviews of the film are positive, with an average score of 7.3/10; the site's "critics consensus: reads: "The American Friend is a slow burning existential thriller that does justice to the Patricia Highsmith source novel." Metacritic, which uses a weighted average, assigned the film a score of 79 out of 100, based on 11 critics, indicating "generally favorable" reviews. Roger Ebert gave the film three stars out of four, writing: "[Wenders] challenges us to admit that we watch (and read) thrillers as much for atmosphere as for plot. And then he gives us so much atmosphere we're almost swimming in it." David Nusair of Reel Film Reviews had a more mixed reaction, calling the film "occasionally thrilling" and praising "Ganz's subtle, thoroughly compelling performance", but criticizing what he called a "disastrous final half hour."

In A Girl and a Gun: The Complete Guide to Film Noir, David N. Meyer says of the film: "Though the plot may not make a whole lot of sense the first time around—and the thick European accents of a couple of the major actors doesn't help—The American Friend is worth the effort. Few movies from any era or genre offer such rich characters, realistic human relationships, gripping action sequences, or sly humor." In Out of the Past: Adventures in Film Noir, Barry Gifford writes: "Of all the 'homage' films made since the 1940s and '50s meant to evoke noir, The American Friend succeeds more than most because of the spaces, the sputters, and sudden shifts of energy that allow the characters to achieve veracity."

Highsmith initially disliked the film, but later changed her mind. Joan Schenkar's biography, The Talented Miss Highsmith: The Secret Life and Serious Art of Patricia Highsmith, quotes Wenders as saying: "I was really happy with the picture and couldn't wait to have Patricia see it. But then, to my great disappointment, she was quite disturbed by it, didn't conceal that either and didn't have anything good to say about it after the screening. I left utterly frustrated. Months later, I got a letter from her. She said she had seen the film a second time, this time in a public screening on the Champs-Élysées during a visit in Paris. And she had much better feelings about it now. ... And she was full of praise for Dennis Hopper, too, whom she had flat-out rejected the first time. She now wrote that my film had captured the essence of that Ripley character better than any other films. You can guess how relieved I was!" In an interview in 1988, Highsmith praised the film's "stylishness" and said the scenes on the train were "terrific."

The film was entered into the 1977 Cannes Film Festival. It was selected as the West German entry for Best Foreign Language Film at the 50th Academy Awards, but was not chosen as one of the five final nominees. The film was also nominated for Best Foreign Language Film by the U.S. National Board of Review.

== Other Ripley films ==
The American Friend is the second film adaptation of a Ripley novel, after Purple Noon (1960). It was followed by The Talented Mr. Ripley in 1999, Ripley's Game in 2002, and Ripley Under Ground in 2005. These films (all written and directed by different people) do not form an official series, and none were made with the intention of explicitly preceding or following the others. A TV series called Ripley also premiered in 2024.

== See also ==
- List of submissions to the 50th Academy Awards for Best Foreign Language Film
- List of German submissions for the Academy Award for Best Foreign Language Film
- Ripley's Game (2002), a film adaptation of the same novel as The American Friend
