= Ripley's Game (film) =

2002 thriller film

- Theatrical release poster
- Directed by: Liliana Cavani
- Screenplay by: Charles McKeown; Liliana Cavani
- Based on: Ripley's Game by Patricia Highsmith
- Produced by: Simon Bosanquet; Ricardo Tozzi; Ileen Maisel
- Starring: John Malkovich; Dougray Scott; Ray Winstone; Lena Headey
- Cinematography: Alfio Contini
- Edited by: Jon Harris
- Music by: Ennio Morricone
- Production company: Mr. Mudd
- Distributed by: 01 Distribuzione (Italy); Entertainment Film Distributors (United Kingdom); Fine Line Features (Worldwide)
- Release dates: 2 September 2002 (Venice); 7 February 2003 (Italy); 30 May 2003 (United Kingdom); 4 September 2003 (United States: TV)
- Running time: 110 minutes
- Countries: Italy; United Kingdom; United States
- Language: English
- Budget: $30 million
- Box office: $6.2 million

Ripley's Game is a 2002 thriller film directed by Liliana Cavani. It is adapted from the 1974 novel Ripley's Game, the third in Patricia Highsmith's series about the murderous adventures of the anti-hero Tom Ripley. John Malkovich stars as Ripley, who arranges for an innocent man (Dougray Scott) to accept a job as a contract killer from a gangster (Ray Winstone).

Ripley's Game grossed $6.2 million on a budget of $30 million, making it a box-office failure; although it received positive reviews. The novel was previously adapted in 1977 as The American Friend.

== Plot ==
Tom Ripley is involved in an art forgery scheme in Berlin, in partnership with the British gangster Reeves. Learning that Reeves has attempted to cheat him, Ripley forces Reeves's client at gunpoint to give him the money intended for the forgeries and kills the man’s bodyguard. He steals back the artwork for himself and tells Reeves that their partnership is over.

Three years later, Ripley is living in a villa in Veneto, Italy, with his wife, Luisa, a harpsichordist. He is invited to a party by a neighbour, Jonathan Trevanny, an art framer who is dying of leukemia. Ripley overhears the host, Jonathan insulting his taste and alluding to his shady reputation. He confronts him and leaves.

Reeves arrives at Ripley's home, to Ripley's annoyance, and asks him to eliminate a rival mobster. Ripley recommends Trevanny for the job as revenge for the slight. Believing Trevanny to be an assassin, Reeves offers him the job for a large fee. Bewildered, Trevanny eventually agrees, to make sure that his wife and son are provided for after his death.

Trevanny travels to Berlin under the pretense of seeing a leukemia specialist and kills the mobster at a museum. He refuses Reeves' offer of more money to kill another mobster, this time on a train, but relents after Reeves threatens his family.

Trevanny freezes on the train and contemplates suicide. Ripley intervenes and the two dispatch the target and his two bodyguards in the train toilet. They return home, where Trevanny attempts to persuade his wife Sarah that he won the money playing roulette.

Reeves ignores Ripley's warnings to keep a low profile, fearing that the mafia will seek reprisal for the killing and deduce who was involved. The mobsters come to Italy seeking revenge, killing Reeves and leaving his body in the boot of their car. They storm Ripley's villa, but Ripley has boobytrapped it. With Trevanny's help, Ripley kills them all.

Ripley leaves Trevanny under the assumption that all the killers have been dispatched. However, Trevanny returns home to find two surviving gangsters holding Sarah captive. Ripley spots the killers' car outside in the bushes and doubles back to Trevanny's to save Sarah. A wounded assassin fires at Ripley, but Trevanny sacrifices himself by jumping in front of the bullet.

Puzzled by Trevanny's selflessness, Ripley tries to give Sarah her husband's share of the blood money, but she spits in his face. When he leaves Sarah, the packet of money is still on the floor. That night, Ripley attends Luisa's concert as if nothing has happened, but smiles at the memory of Trevanny's sacrifice.

== Cast ==
- John Malkovich as Tom Ripley
- Dougray Scott as Jonathan Trevanny
- Ray Winstone as Reeves
- Lena Headey as Sarah Trevanny
- Chiara Caselli as Luisa Harari
- Sam Blitz as Matthew Trevanny
- Paolo Paoloni as Franco
- Evelina Meghnagi as Maria
- Lutz Winde as Ernst
- Wilfred Xander as Belinsky

== Production ==
The film is set in two Palladian villas: one in the center of Asolo, a hilltop town in the province of Treviso, and the other, Villa Emo, in Fanzolo, a hamlet of Vedelago. Other featured locations include Vicenza (including the Piazza dei Signori and the Teatro Olimpico), Padua (including the Pedrocchi Café), Bassano del Grappa, and Berlin (including the Gendarmenmarkt, the Berlin Aquarium of the Berlin Zoo, and the Monbijou Park).

== Reception ==
The film received positive reviews, with a 92% "fresh" rating on Rotten Tomatoes, based on 24 reviews. The website's consensus reads: "Led by a suitably slimy performance from John Malkovich, Ripley's Game brings Patricia Highsmith's bestselling sociopath brilliantly to life." Roger Ebert added Ripley's Game to his "Great Movies" list, calling it "the best of the four" Ripley films he had seen (the other three being Purple Noon, The American Friend, and The Talented Mr. Ripley). He wrote Malkovich is "precisely the Tom Ripley I imagine when I read the novels," praising what he felt to be "one of [his] most brilliant and insidious performances; a study in evil that teases the delicate line between heartlessness and the faintest glimmers of feeling." Ebert criticized the decision not to release the film theatrically in North America, writing: "The failure to open it theatrically was a shameful blunder."

Peter Travers of Rolling Stone gave the film 3.5 stars out of 4, writing: "John Malkovich, oozing danger and sinister charm, gives one of the year’s most memorable and mesmerizing performances in Ripley’s Game... Malkovich oils himself around the plot – icy cool one moment, blazingly violent the next – with a master's finesse. Highsmith wrote five Ripley novels, and other actors have played the part, most recently and most blandly Matt Damon in The Talented Mr. Ripley. But Malkovich owns the role. He plays it for keeps." David Rooney of Variety wrote "Malkovich's elegantly malicious performance gives Ripley's Game a magnetic center, complemented by Liliana Cavani's efficient direction and an enjoyable retro feel that recalls the British Cold War thrillers of the 1960s. Despite some pedestrian plotting and a final act that could be tighter, this is suspenseful adult entertainment that should find a receptive audience."

Other critics were less favorable, such as Peter Bradshaw of The Guardian, who gave the film two stars out of five. Some critics compared the film unfavorably to Wim Wenders' 1977 adaptation, The American Friend. Nathan Rabin of A.V. Club wrote "Ripley's Game fatally lacks the squirmy, desperate humanity that made Wenders' take on the same material so hauntingly tragic. Like Malkovich's suavely generic international criminal, it's all craft and no soul, with complexity and depth functioning as collateral damage for its slick thriller mechanics." Neil Young's Film Lounge gave Ripley's Game a score of 6 out of 10, calling the film a "largely uninspired" adaptation by a "pedestrian" director. Young said The American Friend was "brilliant" by comparison, and that any fan of Highsmith or The American Friend would "have major problems with this version".
