= Tom Ripley =

Fictional character

- Alain Delon as Ripley in Purple Noon
- First appearance: The Talented Mr. Ripley
- Last appearance: Ripley Under Water
- Created by: Patricia Highsmith
- Portrayed by: Alain Delon; Dennis Hopper; Jonathan Kent; Matt Damon; John Malkovich; Barry Pepper; Ian Hart; Andrew Scott (2024 series); Alden Ehrenreich (A Talent for Murder)

In-universe information
- Full name: Thomas Phelps Ripley
- Aliases: Dickie Greenleaf; Derwatt
- Gender: Male
- Occupation: Con artist
- Spouses: Héloïse Plisson; Clementine Balfour (A Talent for Murder)
- Nationality: American

Tom Ripley is a fictional character in the Ripley series of crime novels by American novelist Patricia Highsmith, as well as several film adaptations. He is a charming, amoral career criminal, con artist, and serial killer. The five novels in which he appears—The Talented Mr. Ripley, Ripley Under Ground, Ripley's Game, The Boy Who Followed Ripley, and Ripley Under Water—were published between 1955 and 1991.

Ripley has been critically acclaimed for being "both a likable character and a cold-blooded killer". The Guardian wrote, "It is near impossible, I would say, not to root for Tom Ripley. Not to like him. Not, on some level, to want him to win. Patricia Highsmith does a fine job of ensuring he wheedles his way into our sympathies." Book magazine ranked Ripley on its list of the 100 Best Characters in Fiction since 1900.

== Fictional biography ==
=== Backstory ===
Highsmith introduced Ripley in The Talented Mr. Ripley (1955), in which she provided him with a backstory. He was orphaned at age five when his parents drowned in Boston Harbor, and then raised by his aunt Dottie, a cold, stingy woman who mocked him as a "sissy". As a teenager, he attempted unsuccessfully to run away from his aunt's home to New York City before finally moving there at age 20 to pursue an unsuccessful career as an actor. Ripley subsequently made a meager living as a con artist utilizing his skills in "forging signatures, telling lies, and impersonating practically anybody".

=== Ripliad ===
==== The Talented Mr. Ripley ====
Ripley is paid to go to Italy by shipbuilding magnate Herbert Greenleaf to convince his son Dickie, a half-remembered acquaintance, to return to New York and take over the family business. Ripley befriends the younger Greenleaf and falls in love with the rich young man's indulgent, carefree lifestyle; he also becomes obsessed with Dickie himself. When Dickie grows bored with Ripley and spurns his friendship, Ripley kills him and assumes his identity, living off his trust fund. His scheme gets him into trouble whenever he encounters people who know him and Dickie, however, eventually resulting in him murdering Dickie's friend Freddie Miles when Miles catches him impersonating Dickie.

Ripley ultimately forges Dickie's will leaving him Dickie's inheritance, and then writes a suicide note as Dickie confessing to murdering Freddie. Dickie's father accepts both documents as genuine and makes Ripley the main beneficiary of Dickie's trust fund. The novel ends with Ripley sailing to Greece and rejoicing in his newfound wealth, although he wonders if he will pay for it with a lifetime of paranoia, if he would "see police waiting for him at every pier he ever approached".

==== Ripley Under Ground ====
In Ripley Under Ground, set six years later, Ripley has settled down into a life of leisure in France. He lives in a small country house called Belle Ombre ("Beautiful Shadow") in Villeperce, a fictional small town near Fontainebleau, about an hour’s drive from Paris. He has added to his fortunes by marrying Héloïse Plisson, an heiress who has suspicions about how he makes his money but prefers not to know. He occasionally assists small-time gangster Reeves Minot with lucrative forgery and smuggling jobs, but he avoids direct involvement in crime as much as possible to preserve his shady reputation; rumors about his involvement in Dickie's death continue to haunt him, with the police "half-suspecting" his guilt. Ripley is also a silent partner in a gallery that markets counterfeit paintings by the artist Derwatt, who has actually been dead for years.

When art collector Thomas Murchison finds out that his Derwatt is a fake, Ripley murders him to stop him from exposing the counterfeiting scheme. Bernard Tufts, the artist who creates the ersatz paintings, has a crisis of conscience and threatens Ripley with the police, resulting in a struggle in which Tufts knocks Ripley out with a shovel and buries him alive. Ripley manages to escape, however, and follows Tufts to Salzburg, where he impersonates Derwatt to discredit the notion that he is dead. Tufts kills himself while in a delusional state, believing that Derwatt has returned from the dead to punish him. Ripley returns to Belle Ombre, fearing that he will be caught but resolving to steer the police away from investigating him.

==== Ripley's Game ====
In Ripley's Game, Ripley turns down Minot's offer to kill two rival gangsters in two separate hits. Soon afterward, he is insulted at a party by Jonathan Trevanny, a poor picture framer who has leukemia. To get back at him, Ripley tells Minot that Jonathan is an assassin who can kill his two rivals, while also spreading a rumor that his leukemia has become terminal. Minot approaches Jonathan offering to hire him as a freelance assassin, an offer he reluctantly accepts in order to support his wife and son after his death.

Fascinated by the situation, Ripley helps Jonathan assassinate a Mafia boss, but one of the crime lord's men manages to survive. Ripley sends Heloise and their housekeeper, Mme. Annette, away to the country and holes up with Jonathan in Belle Ombre to wait for reprisals from the mob. Sure enough, two Mafia hitmen show up to kill them, but Ripley kills one of them and forces the other to call his bosses and say that he and Jonathan are not the men they are after; Ripley then kills him anyway.

Jonathan's wife Simone shows up at Belle Ombre demanding to know what is going on - just in time to see her husband disposing of the hitmen's bodies. A few days later, Ripley visits Jonathan's house to smooth things over, only to find a cadre of gangsters ready to kill them all. One of them opens fire on Ripley, but Jonathan pushes him out of the way, suffering a fatal gunshot wound in the process. Ripley kills the gangsters and escapes with Simone, and gives her the money Jonathan had earned as an assassin as a way of thanking him for his selfless sacrifice, which puzzles him.

==== The Boy Who Followed Ripley ====
In The Boy Who Followed Ripley, Ripley befriends Frank Pierson, a teenage boy from a wealthy family who has run away from home. After Frank confesses to Ripley that he killed his own father by pushing him off a cliff, Ripley lets the boy live with him and Heloise at Belle Ombre, seeing in him a kindred spirit. However, Frank is kidnapped by German gangsters who hold him for ransom.

Ripley travels to Berlin and rescues Frank with Minot's help. He takes Frank back to his family and advises him to forget about the murder and move on with his life, but Frank is so overwhelmed with guilt that he kills himself by leaping off the very cliff from which he pushed his father. Ripley is amazed to discover that he is devastated by the boy's death.

==== Ripley Under Water ====
In Ripley Under Water, Ripley's new neighbors, David and Janice Pritchard, hear of his suspicious reputation and begin prying into his private life, simply because they dislike him. When they discover that he murdered Murchison and threaten to expose him, Ripley pursues them with the aid of Ed Bradbury, one of his business partners in the Derwatt forgery scam.

The Pritchards unearth Murchison's corpse and leave it at Ripley's doorstep. Ripley and Bradbury throw the body in a lake outside the Pritchards' house. When the Pritchards see what is happening, a struggle ensues in which they fall into the pond, and Ripley allows them to drown over Bradbury's halfhearted objections. Days later, Ripley meets with the police and denies knowing anything about Murchison's disappearance or the Pritchards' deaths, a story they appear to accept. Ripley then disposes of Murchison's ring, the only piece of evidence connecting him to the murder.

== Characterization ==
=== Personality ===
Highsmith characterizes Ripley as a "suave, agreeable and utterly amoral" con artist and serial killer who always evades justice. Ripley is epicurean and sophisticated, living a life of leisure in rural France. He spends most of his time gardening, painting, or studying languages. He finances his lifestyle with a stolen inheritance, a small income from the Buckmaster Gallery, and his wife's allowance from her wealthy father. He is polite, friendly, and cultured, and dislikes people who lack such qualities; when the Pritchards appear in Ripley Under Water, their poor taste and manners immediately offend him. Ripley has typically been regarded as "cultivated", a "dapper sociopath", and an "agreeable and urbane psychopath."

In his review of Purple Noon, René Clément's 1960 adaptation of The Talented Mr. Ripley, film critic Roger Ebert described Ripley as "a committed hedonist, devoted to great comfort, understated taste, and civilized interests. He has wonderful relationships with women, who never fully understand who or what he is. He has friendships – real ones – with many of his victims. His crimes are like moves in a chess game; he understands that as much as he may like and respect his opponents, he must end with a 'checkmate'."

=== Sexuality ===
While Highsmith never explicitly portrays Ripley as gay or bisexual, certain passages in the Ripley novels imply that he harbors some unacknowledged attraction towards men. In The Talented Mr. Ripley, he is obsessed with Dickie Greenleaf and is jealous of his girlfriend, Marge Sherwood, to the point that he fantasizes about killing her as Dickie. He fears that other people will think he is gay, and jokes that he wants to give up both men and women because he cannot decide which he likes more. In Ripley Under Ground, he recalls "turning green" during his wedding, then going impotent with laughter while having sex with Heloise during their honeymoon.

In The Boy Who Followed Ripley, he reflects that he and Heloise rarely have sex and that frequent sexual demands on her part "really would have turned him off, maybe at once and permanently.” The Boy Who Followed Ripley, meanwhile, has been cited as portraying a homoerotic subtext between Ripley and the novel's supporting protagonist, Frank Pierson. For example, Frank sleeps in Ripley's bed without changing the sheets and speaks of his happiness at being at Belle Ombre with "the words of a lover." Highsmith herself was ambivalent about the subject of Ripley's sexuality. "I don't think Ripley is gay," she said in a 1988 interview with Sight & Sound. "He appreciates good looks in other men, that's true. But he's married in later books. I'm not saying he's very strong in the sex department. But he makes it in bed with his wife."

=== Psychopathy ===
Ripley is portrayed as devoid of conscience; in The Boy Who Followed Ripley, he admits that he has never been seriously troubled by guilt. Though he sometimes feels "regret" about his earliest murders – he considers the murder of Dickie Greenleaf "a youthful, dreadful mistake" and that of Freddie Miles "stupid" and "unnecessary" – he cannot remember the number of his victims.

Ripley is not without redeeming qualities, however. He feels genuine affection (if not love) for several characters throughout the series, and he has his own code of ethics; in Ripley's Game, Ripley reflects that he detests murder unless it is "absolutely necessary". In his review of Purple Noon, Roger Ebert wrote: "Ripley is a criminal of intelligence and cunning who gets away with murder. He's charming and literate, and a monster. It's insidious, the way Highsmith seduces us into identifying with him and sharing his selfishness; Ripley believes that getting his own way is worth whatever price anyone else might have to pay. We all have a little of that in us."

== Adaptations ==
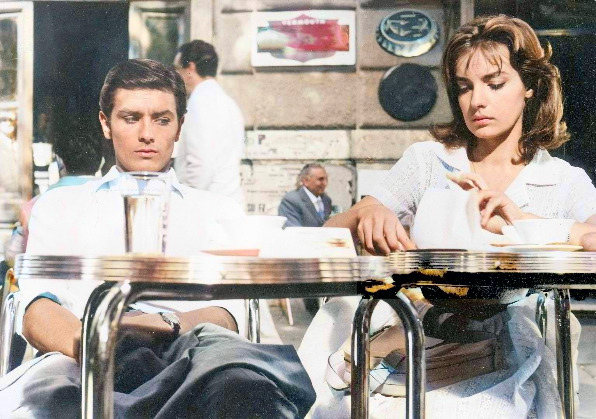
Alain Delon in Purple Noon, the first cinematic incarnation of the character, with Marie Laforêt (as Marge)

Highsmith's first three Ripley novels have been adapted into films. The Talented Mr. Ripley was filmed as Purple Noon (French: Plein Soleil) in 1960, starring Alain Delon as Ripley, and under its original title in 1999, starring Matt Damon. Ripley Under Ground was adapted into a 2005 film, starring Barry Pepper. Ripley's Game was filmed in 1977 as The American Friend, starring Dennis Hopper, and under its original title in 2002, starring John Malkovich.

The Ripley novels have also been adapted for television and radio. The Talented Mr. Ripley was adapted for a January 1956 episode of the anthology television series Studio One, and Jonathan Kent played Ripley in a 1982 episode of The South Bank Show titled "Patricia Highsmith: A Gift for Murder", dramatizing segments of Ripley Under Ground. In 2009, BBC Radio 4 adapted all five Ripley novels with Ian Hart as Ripley.

In 2015, The Hollywood Reporter announced that a group of production companies were planning a television series based on the novels. The following year, Deadline Hollywood announced that the series would be written by Neil Cross, having been in development at Endemol Shine Studios for over a year. In 2019, the show was ordered to series at Showtime, with actor Andrew Scott playing the lead role and writer-director Steven Zaillian replacing Cross. In 2023, the series had moved to Netflix now simply titled Ripley. The series premiered in April 2024, with Scott receiving critical praise and a nomination for the Primetime Emmy Award for Outstanding Lead Actor in a Limited or Anthology Series or Movie for his performance as Ripley.

Of the Ripley portrayals that Highsmith saw, she praised Delon's performance in Purple Noon as "excellent" and described Jonathan Kent as "perfect". She initially disliked Hopper's Ripley in The American Friend, but changed her mind after seeing the film a second time, feeling that he had captured the essence of the character. In Joanna Murray Smith's 2014 play, Switzerland, Tom Ripley comes to life and visits Highsmith, planning to kill her. In the 2014 Sydney Theatre Company premiere production, he was portrayed by Eamon Farren.

In Kim Newman's novel Dracula Cha Cha Cha (also published as Judgment of Tears: Anno Dracula 1959) (1998), Tom Ripley is a supporting character working at the Italian estate of Count Dracula, while plotting to steal vast amounts of wealth from his vampire employer.

The 2026 film A Talent for Murder (adapted from the aforementioned play Switzerland) sees Highsmith (played by Helen Mirren) being approached to write a new Ripley novel. While not a direct adaptation of any Ripley novel, an imagined version of the character appears in the film, played by Alden Ehrenreich, as part of an outline that Highsmith and young literary editor Edward Ridgeway (also played by Ehrenreich) come up with for a proposed sixth novel. Within the metafictional story, Ripley now lives in Rome full-time and pretends to make a legitimate living as an art collector. He sets his sights on Clementine Balfour, a young American heiress (based on an actual woman named Clementine Balfour that Edward meets on the train to Highsmith's home), for her sizable family trust controlled by her grandfather and her great-aunt Peggy, her only remaining relatives. Ripley seduces Clementine and begins courting her. Shortly before their wedding, Ripley kills Clementine's grandfather by poisoning his drink and makes it look like an accident. After he and Clementine marry, Peggy invites the couple over to visit her in Zurich; Ripley fakes a migraine to get out of a dinner engagement, breaks into Peggy's home, and fatally stabs her with a hunting knife. Ripley anticipates enjoying his wife's newfound fortune as he comforts her following Peggy's funeral. At the end of the film, Ripley himself manifests as a hallucination of Highsmith, who reminisces about killing his parents as a young boy and then kills Highsmith with the same hunting knife. After Edward leaves Highsmith's home and meets Clementine on the train again, he takes off his glasses and smiles, implying that he is subconsciously taking on Ripley's mannerisms.
