= The Talented Mr. Ripley (film) =

1999 film by Anthony Minghella

- Theatrical release poster
- Directed by: Anthony Minghella
- Screenplay by: Anthony Minghella
- Based on: The Talented Mr. Ripley (1955 novel) by Patricia Highsmith
- Produced by: William Horberg; Tom Sternberg
- Starring: Matt Damon; Gwyneth Paltrow; Jude Law; Cate Blanchett; Philip Seymour Hoffman; Jack Davenport; James Rebhorn; Sergio Rubini; Philip Baker Hall
- Cinematography: John Seale
- Edited by: Walter Murch
- Music by: Gabriel Yared
- Production companies: Miramax Films; Mirage Enterprises; Timnick Films
- Distributed by: Paramount Pictures (North America); Miramax International (international (Note: Since the acquisition of Miramax by ViacomCBS (now Paramount Skydance), Paramount owns the worldwide rights to the film.))
- Release dates: December 12, 1999 (Fox Bruin Theater); December 25, 1999 (United States)
- Running time: 139 minutes
- Country: United States
- Language: English
- Budget: $40 million
- Box office: $128.8 million

The Talented Mr. Ripley is a 1999 American psychological thriller film written and directed by Anthony Minghella, based on Patricia Highsmith's 1955 novel. Set in the 1950s, it stars Matt Damon as Tom Ripley, an American con artist sent to Italy to convince Dickie Greenleaf (Jude Law), a rich and spoiled playboy, to return home. However, Ripley becomes dangerously attached to him and his lifestyle. Gwyneth Paltrow, Cate Blanchett, and Philip Seymour Hoffman appear in supporting roles. This is the second adaptation of Highsmith's novel, following the 1960 French-language film Purple Noon.

The Talented Mr. Ripley premiered at Fox Bruin Theater on December 12, 1999 before being released by Paramount Pictures in the United States on December 25, 1999, with Miramax International releasing in other territories. The film was a critical and commercial success, grossing $128.8 million worldwide against a $40 million budget. It received five Academy Award nominations, including Best Adapted Screenplay and Best Supporting Actor for Law.

== Plot ==
In 1958 New York City, shipbuilding magnate Herbert Greenleaf, believing Tom Ripley attended Princeton with his son, Dickie, pays Tom to travel to Italy and persuade him to return to the United States. Taking an ocean liner first-class, Tom pretends to be Dickie and befriends American socialite Meredith Logue.

In the seaside village of Mongibello, Tom befriends Dickie and his American girlfriend, Marge Sherwood, claiming to be a former Princeton classmate. He enjoys Dickie's extravagant lifestyle and becomes obsessed with Dickie himself, but Dickie's wealthy friend Freddie Miles distrusts Tom and treats him with contempt. Returning from Rome, Dickie becomes increasingly annoyed by Tom.

Dickie has impregnated and then spurns Silvana, a local woman who then drowns herself. Tom promises a guilt-ridden Dickie to keep the affair a secret. After Herbert cuts off Tom's travel funds, Dickie cancels a trip to Venice and tells Tom that they should part ways. However, Dickie convinces Tom to take a final trip with him to San Remo.

Aboard a small boat, Dickie says he is tired of Tom and is going to marry Marge, while Tom tells Dickie he is selfish and hurting everyone. Their argument becomes physical, and Tom ends up killing Dickie by repeatedly striking him with an oar. Tom takes Dickie's belongings and scuttles the boat. Realizing that locals frequently mistake him for Dickie, Tom assumes his identity. He forges a letter to Marge, convincing her that Dickie has left her and moved to Rome. Tom creates the illusion that Dickie is still alive by checking into one hotel as Dickie and another as himself, then fabricating an exchange of communications between the two. Through forgery, he is able to draw on Dickie's allowance on which he can live lavishly.

In Rome, Tom runs into Meredith, who still knows him as Dickie, and attends an opera with her family. His ruse is threatened when he unexpectedly runs into Marge and her friend, Peter Smith-Kingsley, at the same opera. Tom rushes Meredith out of the opera house and rejects her advances. Later, Freddie shows up at Tom's apartment looking for Dickie. When the landlady addresses Tom as Dickie, Freddie realizes the fraud, so Tom fatally bludgeons Freddie with a sculpted bust and disposes of his body. When Freddie's body is found, police visit the apartment to question "Dickie". Tom forges a suicide note for Dickie that claims responsibility for Freddie's death. Under his real name, Tom travels to Venice, where he again encounters Peter.

Herbert Greenleaf arrives in Italy, accompanied by private detective Alvin MacCarron. Tom is about to kill Marge after she discovers he has Dickie's ring, but Peter arrives and interrupts them. Marge is certain that Tom is culpable, but Herbert dismisses Marge's suspicions. MacCarron tells Tom the police are convinced that Dickie, who had a history of violence, murdered Freddie before killing himself. MacCarron also tells Tom that Herbert intends to bequeath a large portion of Dickie's trust fund to him, to reward his loyalty to Dickie and ensure his silence.

Cleared of his crimes, and with the income to finally live Dickie's lifestyle as himself, Tom boards a liner to Greece with Peter, who is implied to be Tom's lover. During the voyage, Tom runs into Meredith, who is sailing with family members. Tom kisses her and promises to talk later. Tom goes to Peter's cabin. Peter says he saw Tom kissing Meredith and demands answers. After apologizing for lying, a sobbing Tom strangles Peter and returns to his cabin, alone.

== Cast ==
- Matt Damon as Tom Ripley
- Gwyneth Paltrow as Marge Sherwood
- Jude Law as Dickie Greenleaf
- Cate Blanchett as Meredith Logue
- Philip Seymour Hoffman as Freddie Miles
- Jack Davenport as Peter Smith-Kingsley
- James Rebhorn as Herbert Greenleaf
- Sergio Rubini as Inspector Roverini
- Philip Baker Hall as Alvin MacCarron
- Celia Weston as Aunt Joan
- Rosario Fiorello as Fausto
- Stefania Rocca as Silvana
- Ivano Marescotti as Colonnello Verrecchia
- Lisa Eichhorn as Emily Greenleaf
- Silvana Bosi as Ermelinda
- Gianfranco Barra as Desk Manager Aldo

== Production ==
The Talented Mr. Ripley was previously adapted as Purple Noon (1960), directed by René Clément and starring Alain Delon as Ripley. William Horberg, the producer of the 1999 Talented Mr. Ripley, admired the visual style and Delon's performance in Purple Noon but criticized the psychological foundations, which he considered to be reversed in comparison with the novel. To remain more faithful to the original work, Minghella conceived a Ripley who does not embody perfection like Delon, but rather an ordinary, envious individual who aspires to that perfection. Horberg explains: "It wouldn't work for an Alain Delon to play our Ripley—he was too perfect. Instead, Minghella's concept was that Ripley longed to be Alain Delon". Matt Damon referred to the physical efforts required to approach this ideal: "I was supposed to look like Jude Law, which is impossible in the first place: it's like being told you have to look like Alain Delon. I had to at least make my body look like his."

=== Casting ===
The Guardian reported that Leonardo DiCaprio declined the role that went to Matt Damon. Anthony Minghella cast Damon, after seeing his performance in Good Will Hunting, because he felt Damon had the right mix of "credibility, warmth, and generosity" to engage the audience and help them understand how Ripley "thinks and operates". The character of Meredith Logue, not present in the novel, was added by Minghella, with Cate Blanchett in mind. He was "entranced" with Blanchett, after meeting with her and surprised that she was actually interested in playing the small part. Minghella went on to write more scenes for the character, to expand her role.

Minghella happened to see the dailies from a film starring Jude Law, The Wisdom of Crocodiles, that his wife, Carolyn Choa, was producing at the time. Impressed with Law's performance, he offered him the role of Dickie. In his "insane arrogance", as Law put it, he initially refused because he did not wish to play a "pretty boy". After learning of the cast Minghella was assembling and coming to understand that he would be "in safe hands" with Minghella, Law later accepted the part.

=== Filming ===
Except for the beginning scenes filmed in New York City, the film was shot entirely on location in Italy. The cliffside resort town of Positano and various villages on the islands of Ischia and Procida, near Naples, were used to represent the fictional town of Mongibello. Frequent and unpredictable rain hampered the production, with Minghella stating that "we had to deliver this gorgeous Mediterranean world, this beautiful world of Southern Italy, and we could never get Italy to turn beautiful...We would divide the scenes up, often into words, and go out and get two or three words and then, it would start to rain, and we'd have to go back in, again." The scenes taking place in San Remo were filmed in Anzio, a resort town near Rome. Well-known locations included the Piazza Navona, the Spanish Steps and Piazza di Spagna in Rome, and the Caffè Florian in the Piazza San Marco in Venice.

To prepare for the role of Ripley, Damon lost 30 pounds and learned to play the piano. Law gained weight and learned to play the saxophone for his character; he also broke a rib, when he fell backward while filming the murder scene on the boat.

== Release ==
The Talented Mr. Ripley was first screened at Fox Bruin Theater on December 12, 1999. The film was then distributed by Paramount Pictures in North America and released on December 25. Miramax International handled the international distribution for other territories.

== Reception ==
=== Box office ===
The Talented Mr. Ripley earned $6.3 million on its Saturday opening, finishing at number one. The film grossed a complete total of $12.7 million on its wide release opening weekend in 2,307 theaters, putting it at number two behind Any Given Sunday ($13.5 million). It then dropped 2.8 percent on its second weekend with an additional $12.3 million, landing in third place behind Stuart Little and Toy Story 2.

At the end of its box office run, The Talented Mr. Ripley grossed over $81.2 million in the United States and Canada, and $47.5 million from the international market, bringing its worldwide total to $128.7 million. The film managed to recoup its production budget of $40 million.

=== Critical response ===
On the review aggregator website Rotten Tomatoes, The Talented Mr. Ripley holds an approval rating of 85% based on 142 reviews. The website's critics consensus reads, "With Matt Damon's unsettling performance offering a darkly twisted counterpoint to Anthony Minghella's glossy direction, The Talented Mr. Ripley is a suspense thriller that lingers." Metacritic, which uses a weighted average, assigned the film a score of 76 out of 100, based on 35 critics, indicating "generally favorable" reviews. Audiences surveyed by CinemaScore gave the film an average grade of "C+" on an A+ to F scale.

Roger Ebert gave the film four out of four, calling it "an intelligent thriller" that is "insidious in the way it leads us to identify with Tom Ripley ... He's a monster, but we want him to get away with it". In her review for The New York Times, Janet Maslin praised Law's performance: "This is a star-making role for the preternaturally talented English actor Jude Law. Beyond being devastatingly good-looking, Mr. Law gives Dickie the manic, teasing powers of manipulation that make him ardently courted by every man or woman he knows."

Entertainment Weekly gave the film an "A−" rating, and Lisa Schwarzbaum wrote, "Damon is at once an obvious choice for the part and a hard sell to audiences soothed by his amiable boyishness ... the facade works surprisingly well when Damon holds that gleaming smile just a few seconds too long, his Eagle Scout eyes fixed just a blink more than the calm gaze of any non-murdering young man. And in that opacity we see horror." Charlotte O'Sullivan of Sight & Sound wrote, "A tense, troubling thriller, marred only by problems of pacing (the middle section drags) and some implausible characterisation (Meredith's obsession with Ripley never convinces), it's full of vivid, miserable life". Time named it one of the ten best films of the year and called it a "devious twist on the Patricia Highsmith crime novel".

James Berardinelli gave the film two and a half stars out of four, calling it "a solid adaptation" that "will hold a viewer's attention", but criticized "Damon's weak performance" and "a running time that's about 15 minutes too long." Berardinelli compared the film unfavorably with the previous adaptation, Purple Noon, which he gave four stars. He wrote, "The remake went back to the source material, Patricia Highsmith's The Talented Mr. Ripley. The result, while arguably truer to the events of Highsmith's book, is vastly inferior. To say it suffers by comparison to Purple Noon is an understatement. Almost every aspect of René Clément's 1960 motion picture is superior ... from the cinematography to the acting to the screenplay. Matt Damon might make a credible Tom Ripley, but only for those who never experienced Alain Delon's portrayal."

In his review for The New York Observer, Andrew Sarris wrote, "On balance, The Talented Mr. Ripley is worth seeing more for its undeniably delightful journey than its final destination. Perhaps wall-to-wall amorality and triumphant evil leave too sour an aftertaste even for the most sophisticated anti-Hollywood palate." In his review for The Guardian, Peter Bradshaw wrote, "The Talented Mr. Ripley begins as an ingenious exposition of the great truth about charming people having something to hide: namely, their utter reliance on others. It ends up as a dismayingly un-thrilling thriller and bafflingly unconvincing character study."

In her review for The Village Voice, Amy Taubin criticized Minghella as a "would-be art film director who never takes his eye off the box office, doesn't allow himself to become embroiled in such complexity. He turns The Talented Mr. Ripley into a splashy tourist trap of a movie. The effect is rather like reading the National Enquirer in a café overlooking the Adriatic." The director Florian Henckel von Donnersmarck cited The Talented Mr. Ripley as one of his favorite films.

=== Accolades ===
Year	Award	Category	Nominee(s)	Result	Ref.
1999	Academy Awards	Best Supporting Actor	Jude Law	Nominated	
1999	Academy Awards	Best Adapted Screenplay	Anthony Minghella	Nominated	
1999	Academy Awards	Best Original Score	Gabriel Yared	Nominated	
1999	Academy Awards	Best Production Design	Roy Walker and Bruno Cesari	Nominated	
1999	Academy Awards	Best Costume Design	Ann Roth and Gary Jones	Nominated	
2000	BAFTA Awards	Best Film	William Horberg; Tom Sternberg	Nominated	
2000	BAFTA Awards	Best Direction	Anthony Minghella	Nominated	
2000	BAFTA Awards	Best Actor in a Supporting Role	Jude Law	Won	
2000	BAFTA Awards	Best Actress in a Supporting Role	Cate Blanchett	Nominated	
2000	BAFTA Awards	Best Adapted Screenplay	Anthony Minghella	Nominated	
2000	BAFTA Awards	Best Cinematography	John Seale	Nominated	
2000	BAFTA Awards	Best Film Music	Gabriel Yared	Nominated	
2000	Berlin International Film Festival	Golden Bear	Anthony Minghella	Nominated	
2000	Broadcast Film Critics Association Awards	Best Film	The Talented Mr. Ripley	Nominated	
2000	Broadcast Film Critics Association Awards	Best Composer	Gabriel Yared	Won	
2000	Chicago Film Critics Association Awards	Best Cinematography	John Seale	Nominated	
2001	Empire Awards	Best British Actor	Jude Law	Nominated	
2000	Golden Globe Awards	Best Motion Picture – Drama	The Talented Mr. Ripley	Nominated	
2000	Golden Globe Awards	Best Actor – Motion Picture Drama	Matt Damon	Nominated	
2000	Golden Globe Awards	Best Supporting Actor – Motion Picture	Jude Law	Nominated	
2000	Golden Globe Awards	Best Director	Anthony Minghella	Nominated	
2000	Golden Globe Awards	Best Original Score	Gabriel Yared	Nominated	
2000	Las Vegas Film Critics Society Awards	Best Film	The Talented Mr. Ripley	Nominated	
2000	Las Vegas Film Critics Society Awards	Best Director	Anthony Minghella	Nominated	
2000	Las Vegas Film Critics Society Awards	Best Actor	Matt Damon	Nominated	
2000	Las Vegas Film Critics Society Awards	Best Screenplay	Anthony Minghella	Nominated	
2000	Las Vegas Film Critics Society Awards	Best Score	Gabriel Yared	Nominated	
2000	Las Vegas Film Critics Society Awards	Best Cinematography	John Seale	Nominated	
2000	London Film Critics Circle Awards	British Supporting Actor of the Year	Jude Law	Nominated	
2000	London Film Critics Circle Awards	British Screenwriter of the Year	Anthony Minghella	Nominated	
2000	MTV Movie Awards	Best Musical Sequence	Matt Damon; Rosario Fiorello; Jude Law	Nominated	
2000	MTV Movie Awards	Best Villain	Matt Damon	Nominated	
2000	National Board of Review Awards	Top Ten Films	The Talented Mr. Ripley	Nominated	
2000	National Board of Review Awards	Best Director	Anthony Minghella	Won	
2000	National Board of Review Awards	Best Supporting Actor	Philip Seymour Hoffman	Won	
2000	Online Film Critics Society Awards	Best Adapted Screenplay	Anthony Minghella	Nominated	
1999	Satellite Awards	Best Film	The Talented Mr. Ripley	Nominated	
1999	Satellite Awards	Best Director	Anthony Minghella	Nominated	
1999	Satellite Awards	Best Supporting Actor – Motion Picture Drama	Jude Law	Nominated	
1999	Satellite Awards	Best Adapted Screenplay	Anthony Minghella	Nominated	
1999	Satellite Awards	Best Cinematography	John Seale	Nominated	
1999	Satellite Awards	Best Editing	Walter Murch	Nominated	
2000	Teen Choice Awards	Choice Movie: Actor	Matt Damon	Nominated	
2000	Teen Choice Awards	Choice Movie: Breakout Star	Jude Law	Nominated	
2000	Teen Choice Awards	Choice Movie: Drama	The Talented Mr. Ripley	Nominated	
2000	Teen Choice Awards	Choice Movie: Liar	Matt Damon	Nominated	
2000	Writers Guild of America Awards	Best Adapted Screenplay	Anthony Minghella	Nominated	

== Related media ==
The Talented Mr. Ripley is the third Ripley film adaptation, following Purple Noon (1960) and The American Friend (1977). It was followed by Ripley's Game (2002) and Ripley Under Ground (2005), but none of the films form an official series.

In April 2024, the television miniseries Ripley, also an adaptation of Highsmith's 1955 novel, was released. The plot of the 2012 Indian Tamil movie Naan is loosely based on this film, but in a different setting.

== In other media ==
A disguised Damon was credited under the "Dickie Greenleaf" name for his cameo in the film Deadpool 2 (2018).
