= Ripley Under Ground =

1970 novel by Patricia Highsmith

- First US edition
- Author: Patricia Highsmith
- Language: English
- Series: Ripliad
- Genre: Crime novel
- Publisher: Heinemann (UK) & Doubleday (USA)
- Publication date: June 1970
- Publication place: United States
- Media type: Print (Hardback & Paperback)
- Pages: 298 (first edition, hardback)
- ISBN: 9780349004655 (first edition, hardback)
- Preceded by: The Talented Mr. Ripley
- Followed by: Ripley's Game

Ripley Under Ground is a psychological thriller by Patricia Highsmith, the second novel in her Ripliad series. It was published in June 1970.

== Plot summary ==
Six years after the events of The Talented Mr. Ripley, Tom Ripley is now in his early thirties and living a comfortable life in France (near Fontainebleau) with his wife, heiress Héloïse Plisson. The lifestyle at his estate, Belle Ombre, is supported by Dickie Greenleaf's fortune, occasional fence work with an American named Reeves Minot, and Derwatt Ltd.— an art forgery scheme that Ripley helped set up years before as a silent partner.

Years prior, after the painter Philip Derwatt disappeared and committed suicide in Greece, his friends—photographer Jeff Constant and freelance journalist Ed Banbury—began to publicize his work and sold a number of authentic paintings. Thanks to their efforts, Derwatt became more famous and his paintings more valuable. When the original Derwatts began to run out, Ripley went into business with them and persuaded Bernard Tufts, another painter, to produce forged Derwatts. The money is rolling in, but Tufts, who had idolized Derwatt, is plagued by guilt for his role in the scheme.

Derwatt Ltd. is threatened by a disgruntled American collector, Thomas Murchison, who surmises that one of his Derwatts is a forgery. Worried that the lid is about to be blown on the whole scheme, Ripley decides to go to London and impersonate Derwatt, meet with Murchison and convince him that the paintings are genuine. Ripley is unsuccessful, however, particularly as Tufts meets with Murchison and tells him not to buy any more Derwatts. Ripley, as himself, invites Murchison to Belle Ombre to inspect his own two Derwatt paintings—one genuine, one a fake—to try to dissuade him from taking the case to a Tate Gallery curator and the police.

Murchison inspects Ripley's paintings and rightly believes the fake is a fake. Realizing that the argument is futile, Ripley comes clean on the entire scam, asking for mercy for Tufts' sake. Murchison refuses, however, so Ripley kills him. He abandons Murchison's suitcase and painting at Orly Airport, then buries his body in the woods near Belle Ombre. Later, Dickie's cousin Chris comes to stay while on a European tour. He notices the fresh grave outside the house. Tufts also visits Ripley, saying he wants to confess everything to the police. Ripley tells Tufts that he killed Murchison and, realizing his own terrible choice of a gravesite, asks him to help move the body. Together, they dump the corpse in a river.

The French police, together with Inspector Webster from Metropolitan Police, investigate Murchison's disappearance, making trips to Belle Ombre and inspecting the property. Tufts leaves a hanging effigy in the cellar that is discovered by Héloïse, along with a note suggesting that he is going to confess. When he returns to Belle Ombre, Tufts unsuccessfully tries to strangle Ripley, who feels pity for the disturbed man and does not retaliate. Later, Tufts knocks Ripley out with a shovel and buries him alive in Murchison's empty grave. Ripley manages to escape and returns to London to impersonate Derwatt for a second appearance, this time for Webster and Murchison's wife. Mrs. Murchison decides to pay a visit to Belle Ombre, the last place her husband was seen.

After Mrs. Murchison's visit, Ripley realizes that Tufts is contemplating suicide. Feeling responsible, he searches for him in Greece, Paris and finally Salzburg. When he approaches Tufts, the painter believes Ripley is a ghost. Tufts runs from Ripley and leaps off a cliff to his death. Ripley partially cremates and buries the body. He tells Webster that Derwatt committed suicide and Tufts disappeared in Salzburg, presumably to follow suit. He gives Webster some of Tuft’s remains—which he claims are Derwatt’s—and agrees to accompany him to Salzburg to show him where the rest of his body is buried. The novel ends with Ripley steeling himself for another performance with Webster and the Austrian police.

== Reception ==
In the New York Times, Allen J. Hubin wrote that Highsmith's "portrayal of the police of two nations as louts eager to be flummoxed by her non‐hero's transparent machinations leaves me blank with incredulity."

Ian Hamilton felt the title character possessed "the relaxed panache of a contented psychopath as if Ripley's real inheritance from Dickie Greenleaf was not normality but the confidence to nourish and exercise abnormality".

H. R. F. Keating points to Tom's murder of Murchison as emblematic of situational ethics. One scholar calls Tom Ripley a "moral Typhoid Mary...a malignant influence on anyone sucked into his orbit..." Amid a broader discussion of Ripley as Highsmith's sinthome, Fiona Peters points to the murder of Murchison as most emblematic of the villain's ethos. Ripley is desperate to make Murchison understand his worldview, but when he cannot, Ripley feels forced to kill him.

According to Michael Dirda, Ripley Under Ground considers authenticity, and the difference between appearance and reality. As Ripley admires a pair of Derwatt paintings on his walls, he actually comes to prefer the forgery over the genuine artwork. Dirda notes, "Fakery, though, suffuses every page of Ripley Under Ground. Tom pretends to be Derwatt. Murchison appears to catch a plane at Orly. An effigy of Bernard is found hanging by its neck. A supposedly dead man rises from his grave. Bernard is haunted by what seems a ghost. In this counterfeit world only the pragmatic Tom thrives, for he alone recognizes that there is no distinction that matters between what is real and what is only apparently real."

== Adaptations ==
=== Film ===
- The 1977 film The American Friend, primarily based on Ripley's Game, also uses plot elements of Ripley Under Ground.
- The novel was filmed in 2005: Ripley Under Ground stars Barry Pepper as Ripley and features Willem Dafoe, Alan Cumming, and Tom Wilkinson in supporting roles. The film was directed by Roger Spottiswoode.

=== Television ===
- Parts of the novel were adapted in "A Gift for Murder", a 1982 episode of The South Bank Show. Jonathan Kent plays Ripley, and Patricia Highsmith herself cameos.

=== Radio ===
- The 2009 BBC Radio 4 adaptation stars Ian Hart as Ripley.
