= Ripley's Game =

1974 novel by Patricia Highsmith

- First edition (UK)
- Author: Patricia Highsmith
- Cover artist: Graham Miller
- Language: English
- Series: Ripliad
- Genre: Crime novel
- Publisher: Heinemann (UK) & Random House (USA)
- Publication date: 11 March 1974 (UK); May 1974 (US)
- Publication place: United States
- Media type: Print (Hardback & Paperback)
- Pages: 288 pp
- ISBN: 0-434-33514-2
- OCLC: 1057535
- Dewey Decimal: 813/.5/4
- LC Class: PZ3.H53985 Rk5 PS3558.I366
- Preceded by: Ripley Under Ground
- Followed by: The Boy Who Followed Ripley

Ripley's Game is a 1974 psychological thriller novel by Patricia Highsmith, the third in her series about the con artist and murderer Tom Ripley.

== Plot summary ==
Tom Ripley continues enjoying his wealthy lifestyle in France with his wife, Héloïse. He spends his days living comfortably at his estate, Belle Ombre, until an associate, American criminal Reeves Minot, asks him to commit murder for him. Ripley—who "detest[s] murder, unless absolutely necessary"—turns down the offer of $96,000 for two hits, and Minot goes back to Hamburg.

The previous month, Ripley went to a party in Fontainebleau, where he was insulted by the host, Jonathan Trevanny, a poor British picture framer suffering from myeloid leukemia. As revenge, Ripley suggests to Minot that he persuade Trevanny to commit the murders. To ensure that the plan will work, Ripley starts a rumor that Trevanny has only months to live and suggests that Minot fabricate evidence that Trevanny's leukemia has worsened, though Minot does not. Trevanny, who fears his death will leave his wife and son destitute, accepts Minot's offer of a visit to a medical specialist in Hamburg. There, he is persuaded to commit a murder in exchange for money.

After carrying out the contract—a shooting in a crowded U-Bahn station—Trevanny insists that he is through as a hired gun. Minot invites him to Munich, where he visits another doctor. Minot persuades Trevanny to kill a Mafia boss, this time on a train using either a garrotte or a gun. Trevanny resolves to shoot the mafioso and commit suicide before he can be caught, asking Minot to ensure that his wife gets the money. Before he can go through with the hit, Ripley, who is fascinated by the situation, arrives and executes the mafioso himself. He asks Trevanny not to tell Minot.

Trevanny's wife, Simone, discovers a Swiss bank book with a large sum in his name and suspects that he is hiding something. She links the rumor about her husband's condition to Ripley and asks Trevanny to tell her how he has been making so much money. Trevanny asks Ripley to help concoct a credible story. Ripley acknowledges his role in Trevanny's dilemma and promises to shepherd him through the ordeal. The Mafia become suspicious of Minot and bomb his house, prompting him to flee. Ripley begins to fear Mafia revenge when he receives suspicious phone calls. After sending Heloïse and their housekeeper away, Ripley asks Trevanny to help him deal with any reprisals at Belle Ombre.

When two Mafia hitmen arrives, Ripley kills one, forces the other to phone his boss in Milan and say that Ripley is not the man they are searching for, then kills him. Simone arrives demanding answers, discovers the corpses and is sent away in a taxi. Ripley and Trevanny drive to a remote village to burn the corpses. A few days later, Ripley visits Trevanny's house, where a quartet of Mafia gunmen appear. One of them opens fire on Ripley, but Trevanny steps in front of him and is mortally wounded; he dies in Ripley's car on the way to hospital. Ripley is unsure whether Trevanny's action was by accident or design.

A few months later, Ripley encounters Simone in Fontainebleau, and she spits at him. He realizes that Simone has accepted her husband's blood money and in doing so has remained silent about her suspicions of Ripley.

== Reception ==
In The New York Times, Christopher Lehmann-Haupt wrote that the novel "gets off to a very strong beginning" and described how he appreciated the plot once Ripley set it in motion and stood back. He concluded:

But then, at the height of the climactic scene ... Miss Highsmith blows the whole thing. She decides to bring Tom Ripley back to center stage, and since there is no reason whatsoever for him to be there, she must force him on us implausibly. From that point on the pieces of her novel fall further and further apart, and by the end the whole business has gotten so silly that it is difficult to recall what got us interested in the first place.

== Adaptations ==
=== Film ===
- Ripley's Game was adapted in 1977 by Wim Wenders as Der Amerikanische Freund, starring Dennis Hopper as Ripley.
- A 2002 adaptation under its original title was made by director Liliana Cavani, with John Malkovich as Ripley. Though more faithful to the novel's plot, depictions of certain characters (notably Reeves and Ripley's wife) were significantly altered, and many scenes were removed or changed considerably.

=== Radio ===
- The 2009 BBC Radio 4 adaptation stars Ian Hart as Ripley, Helen Longworth as Heloise, Tom Brooke as Trevanny, Paul Rider as Minot and Janice Acquah as Simone.
