= The Boy Who Followed Ripley =

Novel by Patricia Highsmith

- First edition (UK)
- Author: Patricia Highsmith
- Cover artist: Bill Richmond
- Language: English
- Series: Ripliad
- Genre: Crime novel, psychological thriller
- Publisher: Heinemann (UK); Lippincott & Crowell (US)
- Publication date: April 1980 (UK); May 1980 (US)
- Publication place: United States
- Media type: Print (hardback & paperback)
- Pages: 288 pp (first edition hardcover)
- ISBN: 0-434-33520-7 (first edition hardcover)
- OCLC: 7004090
- Dewey Decimal: 813/.54 19
- LC Class: PS3558.I366 B69 1980
- Preceded by: Ripley's Game
- Followed by: Ripley Under Water

The Boy Who Followed Ripley is a 1980 psychological thriller novel by Patricia Highsmith, the fourth in her series about career criminal Tom Ripley. In this book, Ripley continues living quietly on his French estate, Belle Ombre, only obliquely involved in criminal activity. His idyll is shaken when he meets a teenaged boy who is hiding from the police.

== Plot summary ==
Tom Ripley meets an American teenager named Billy who is working as a gardener in a Paris exurb. After spending some time together, he deduces that Billy is actually Frank Pierson, the missing son of a recently deceased American tycoon. After some men inquire about Frank at the house where he is living, Tom takes him home under the pretense that he will do some gardening.

Frank soon confesses that he pushed his father's wheelchair over a cliff. He sought Ripley out because of his questionable reputation. Ripley recognizes Frank as a kindred spirit and tries to help him come to peace with the murder. Frank adores Ripley, calls him "sir" and instantly obeys nearly every order Tom gives. He agrees to return home but wants to stay in Europe a little longer.

Tom's underworld connection, Reeves Minot, furnishes a new passport for Frank, and they travel to West Berlin. During a walk in the Grunewald, Frank is kidnapped. Ripley coordinates the Piersons' $2 million ransom with the help of a private detective. Instead of delivering the money, Ripley impulsively kills one of the kidnappers. He sets up another exchange at a gay bar and attends dressed in drag. When the kidnappers leave empty-handed, he follows them to their hideout. Still in drag, he scares them away and rescues Frank.

Frank stalls for time in Europe with Tom, dreading the return home. Tom agrees to return with him to Kennebunkport. He continues to urge Frank to justify his father's murder and move on. Frank claims heartbreak over a girl named Teresa and is unable to follow Tom's advice. Tom stops him from jumping to his death off the cliff where Frank killed his father. As Tom prepares to depart for France, Frank returns to the cliff and commits suicide. Tom is shaken by his death and keeps a stuffed bear that Frank had won in Berlin.

== Major themes ==
Highsmith sets the novel against the oppressive atmosphere of Cold War Germany, and the hedonism of West Berlin, in particular the gay bar scene. Ripley tolerates — and sympathizes with — the gay characters he encounters.

== Adaptations ==
=== Radio ===
The 2009 BBC Radio 4 adaptation stars Ian Hart as Ripley, Nicholas Hoult as Frank and Helen Longworth as Heloise.
