= Purple Noon =

1960 film by René Clément

- French theatrical release poster
- French: Plein soleil
- Directed by: René Clément
- Screenplay by: René Clément; Paul Gégauff
- Based on: The Talented Mr. Ripley (1955 novel) by Patricia Highsmith
- Produced by: Robert Hakim; Raymond Hakim
- Starring: Alain Delon; Marie Laforêt; Maurice Ronet
- Cinematography: Henri Decaë
- Edited by: Françoise Javet
- Music by: Nino Rota
- Production companies: Paris Film; Paritalia; Titanus
- Distributed by: CCFC (France); Titanus (Italy)
- Release dates: 10 March 1960 (France); 2 September 1960 (Italy)
- Running time: 115 minutes
- Countries: France; Italy
- Language: French
- Box office: $618,090; 2,437,874 admissions (France)

Purple Noon (French: Plein soleil, lit. 'Full sun'; also known as Blazing Sun, Lust for Evil, and Talented Mr. Ripley) is a 1960 psychological thriller co-written and directed by René Clément, based upon Patricia Highsmith's 1955 novel The Talented Mr. Ripley. It stars Alain Delon (in his first major film role) as Tom Ripley, along with Marie Laforêt and Maurice Ronet.

In the film, Ripley is a young American con artist sent to Italy to convince a wealthy playboy, Philippe Greenleaf (Ronet), to return home. As Tom becomes obsessed with Philippe's luxurious lifestyle, he devises a plan to take over Philippe's life.

Purple Noon received positive reviews and made Delon an international star. A second adaptation of the novel, The Talented Mr. Ripley, was released in 1999.

== Plot ==
The young American Tom Ripley has been sent to Italy by the father of a wealthy French playboy, Philippe Greenleaf, to persuade him to return to San Francisco and take over the family business. However, Philippe has no intention of doing so.

Tom becomes fixated on Philippe and his fiancée, Marge, and covets their life of luxury in the seaside town of Mongibello. Philippe grows bored with Tom and becomes cruel and abusive to him. During a yachting trip, Philippe strands Tom in the dinghy and accidentally leaves him to drift for hours in the sun.

Tom devises a plan to kill Philippe and steal his identity. He leaves evidence of Philippe's philandering for Marge to find. Finding that Tom has obtained his bank records, Philippe seeks to draw him out. After Marge goes ashore following an argument with Philippe, Philippe confronts Tom, who admits his plan. Philippe offers Tom a substantial sum to leave him and Marge alone, but Tom rebuffs it, saying he is interested in far more.

Tom stabs Philippe, wraps his corpse in canvas and weighs it with an anchor. He is preparing to dump it overboard when he is hit by the ship's boom and knocked into the sea, taking Philippe's corpse with him. Tom makes it back onto the ship.

Returning to Mongibello alone, Tom informs Marge that Philippe has decided to stay away. He goes to Rome, skillfully replaces Philippe's picture with his own in Philippe's passport, masters forging Philippe's signature, and takes over his wealth, identity, and lifestyle.

When Philippe's friend Freddy Miles tracks down "Philippe's" hideaway, he is surprised to only find Tom there. Feeling that Freddy is beginning to suspect the truth, Tom impulsively murders him and dumps the body outside town. Freddy's body is soon found, and the Italian police become involved, suspecting "Philippe" in the murder. Tom continues his charade, switching between his own identity and Philippe's to give the illusion that Philippe is still alive and on the run.

Tom survives a string of close calls, throwing the Italian police off his trail and seemingly outwitting everyone. After forging Philippe's suicide note and a will that leaves Philippe's entire fortune to Marge, Tom thinks he is finally in the clear. He returns to Mongibello and then seduces Marge, in Philippe's home.

Philippe's father arrives in Mongibello to settle the transfer of Philippe's estate and the sale of his yacht. Marge leaves Tom at the beach to go meet Philippe's father, while Tom goes to a seaside café and celebrates the success of his gambit by ordering the best drink in the house. As Philippe's boat is being pulled out of the water so a potential buyer can inspect it, Marge is horrified to see Philippe's canvas-wrapped body dragged up the slipway behind it, the loose end of the lashing having become wrapped around the sailboat's propeller. A police inspector from Rome who has been watching Tom goes to the café, where he has the waitress tell Tom, who is lounging in the sun, that there is a phone call for him. Tom smirks and, unsuspectingly, walks into a trap.

== Cast ==
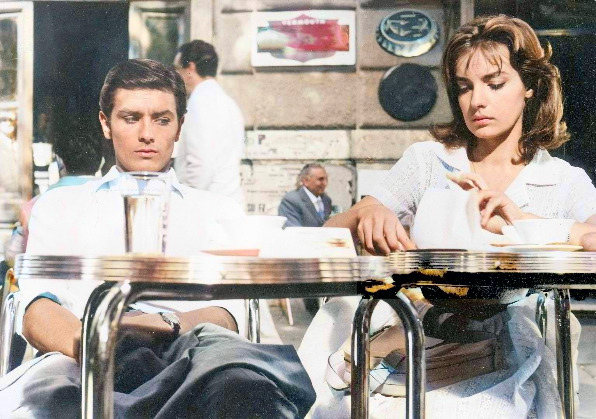
Alain Delon (Tom Ripley) and Marie Laforêt (Marge Duval) in August 1959 during production of the film in Italy.

- Alain Delon as Tom Ripley
- Marie Laforêt as Marge Duval
- Maurice Ronet as Philippe Greenleaf
- Elvire Popesco as Madame Popova
- Erno Crisa as Inspector Riccordi
- Frank Latimore as O'Brien
- Billy Kearns as Freddy Miles
- Ave Ninchi as Signora Gianna, Tom's landlady in Rome

Other actors in the film include Nerio Bernardi as the maritime agency director, Nicolas Petrov as Boris the dancer, Jacqueline Parey as Popova's assistant Ingrid, Viviane Chantel as a Belgian tourist, Barbel Fanger as Philippe's father Mr. Greenleaf, Lily Romanelli as Philippe's housekeeper and Paul Müller as a blind man in Rome.

Director Clément has an uncredited cameo appearance in the film as a clumsy waiter. Romy Schneider, who was Delon's girlfriend when the film was made, appears as one of Freddy's female companions in the film's opening scene.

== Production ==
=== Casting ===
Marie Laforêt (as Marge Duval) and Alain Delon (as Tom Ripley)

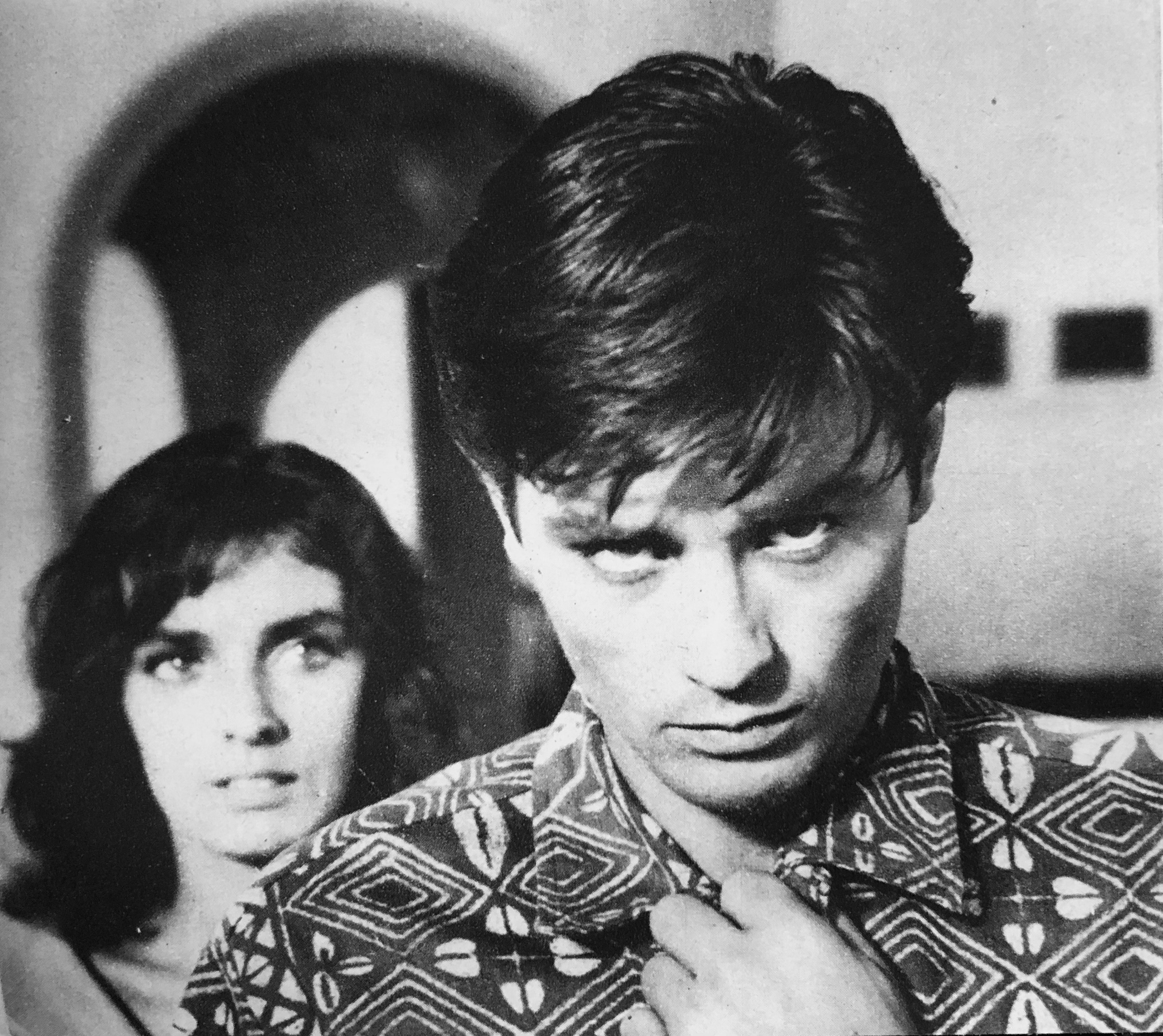

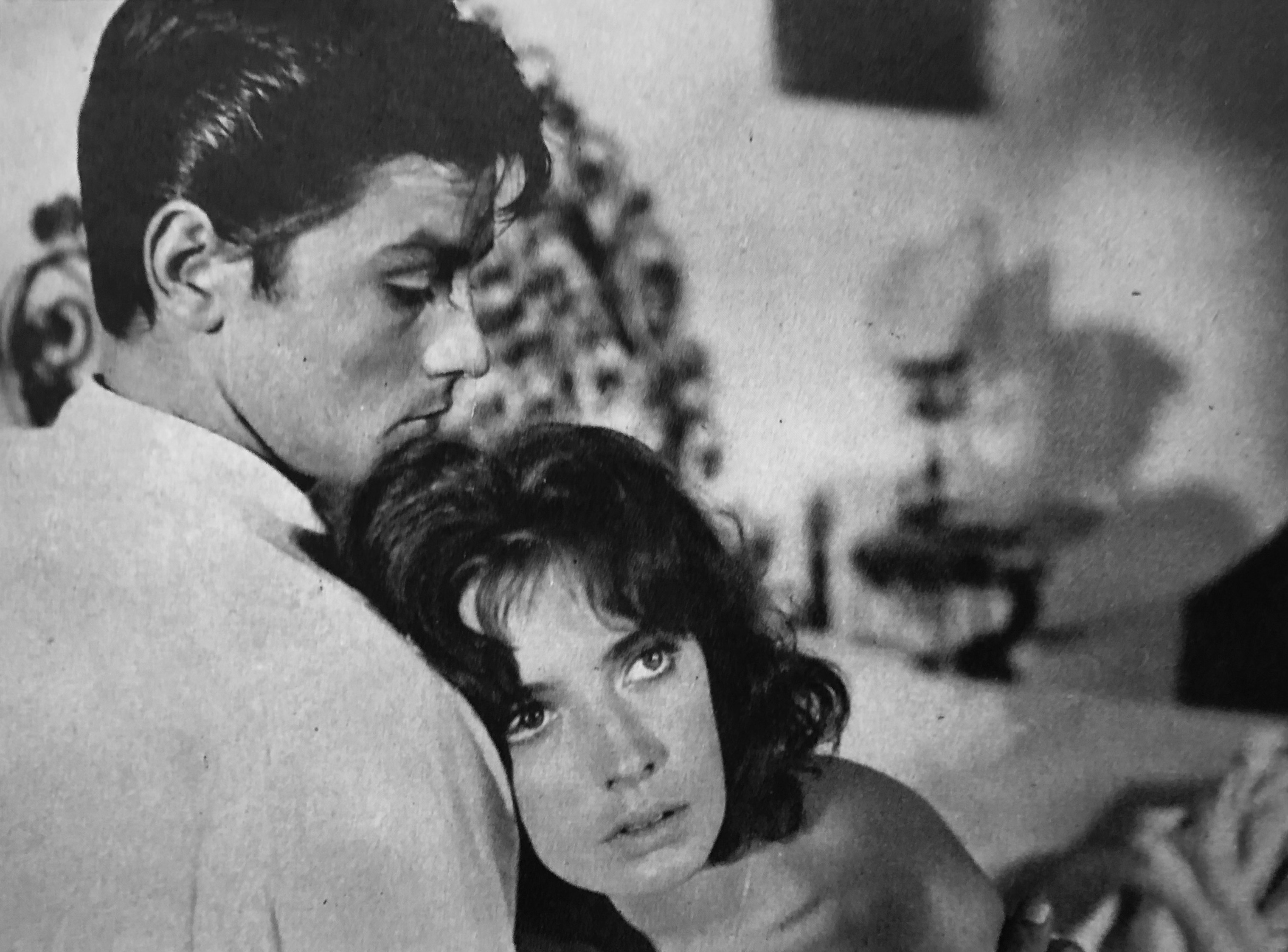

Alain Delon was cast after director Clément saw him in Women Are Weak (1959). Originally, he cast Delon as Greenleaf, with Jacques Charrier as Ripley and Alexandra Stewart as Marie. Delon, after studying the script, declined the offered role, stating that he would be a better fit for the main character. Despite the opposition of the Hakim brothers, they were eventually won over after Clément's wife Bella argued in his favor.

Charrier and Stewart were both replaced. Clément considered casting an established actress like Audrey Hepburn, Jean Seberg, or Elsa Martinelli, before casting 19-year-old newcomer Marie Laforêt.

Expat American actors Frank Latimore and Billy Kearns were cast in supporting roles.

=== Filming ===
Principal photography began on 3 August 1959. Shooting took place mainly on-location in southern Italy; in Naples, Ischia, and Procida. The opening scene was shot in Rome. Filming wrapped on 22 October.

The opening titles were designed by Maurice Binder.

== Reception ==
Purple Noon was lauded by critics and made Delon a star. In 1962, Clément and Gégauff won an Edgar Award from the Mystery Writers of America for Best Foreign Film Screenplay. On the review aggregator website Rotten Tomatoes, 92% of 39 critics' reviews are positive, with an average rating of 8.2/10. The website's consensus reads: "The talented Tom Ripley is brought to enigmatic life on the screen in Purple Noon, an exquisite thriller wherein the murderous social climber is embodied by an unnerving Alain Delon." The film enjoys a loyal cult following, with fans including film director Martin Scorsese.

Roger Ebert gave the film three stars (compared to the four-star review he gave to 1999's The Talented Mr. Ripley), writing that "the best thing about the film is the way the plot devises a way for Ripley to create a perfect cover-up", while criticizing the "less than satisfactory ending", about which he wrote: "Purple Noon ends as it does only because Clement doesn't have Highsmith's iron nerve."

James Berardinelli rated Purple Noon higher than The Talented Mr. Ripley, giving it a four-star review (compared to two-and-a-half stars for The Talented Mr. Ripley). Berardinelli praised Delon's acting, writing that "Tom is fascinating because Delon makes him so", and also complimented the film for "expert camerawork and crisp direction". In the entry for Purple Noon on Berardinelli's All-Time Top 100 list, he compared it to the 1999 film, saying: "The remake went back to the source material, Patricia Highsmith's The Talented Mr. Ripley. The result, while arguably truer to the events of Highsmith's book, is vastly inferior. To say it suffers by comparison to Purple Noon is an understatement. Almost every aspect of Rene Clement's 1960 motion picture is superior to that of Minghella's 1999 version, from the cinematography to the acting to the screenplay. Matt Damon might make a credible Tom Ripley but only for those who never experienced Alain Delon's portrayal."

Nandini Ramnath, writing for Scroll.in, said: "The definitive portrayal of crime novelist Patricia Highsmith's most enduring creation was as early as 1960. Damon and Hopper (Note: Dennis Hopper portrayed Tom Ripley in Wim Wenders' 1977 film The American Friend.) come close to conveying the ruthlessness and ambition of Tom Ripley, but Delon effortlessly captures his mystique."

Highsmith's opinion of the film was mixed. She felt that Alain Delon was "excellent" in the role of Tom Ripley and described the film overall as "very beautiful to the eye and interesting for the intellect", but criticized the ending (in which it is implied that Ripley is to be caught by the police): "[I]t was a terrible concession to so-called public morality that the criminal had to be caught." The Japanese filmmaker Akira Kurosawa cited Purple Noon as one of his 100 favorite films.

Screenwriter Paul Gégauff wrote a variation on the same story in 1968 when he worked on Les biches with Claude Chabrol.

== Restoration and re-release ==
In 2012, StudioCanal funded a restoration of the film by the Immagine Ritrovata laboratory, to be shown at the 2013 Cannes Film Festival as part of a homage to Delon's career prior to a theatrical re-release in (at least) France.

On 4 December 2012, The Criterion Collection released the high-definition digital restoration of Purple Noon on Blu-ray and DVD. Special features include an interview with René Clément scholar and author Denitza Bantcheva, archival interviews with Alain Delon and Patricia Highsmith, the film's original English-language trailer, and a booklet featuring an essay by film critic Geoffrey O'Brien and excerpts from a 1981 interview with Clément. The film has also been released on Blu-ray in the UK and Germany (by StudioCanal in 2013), and Japan (by Kinokuniya in 2011).
