= Life Itself (2014 film) =

- Theatrical release poster
- Directed by: Steve James
- Based on: Life Itself: A Memoir by Roger Ebert
- Produced by: Zak Piper; Steve James; Garrett Basch
- Cinematography: Dana Kupper
- Edited by: Steve James; David E. Simpson
- Music by: Joshua Abrams
- Production companies: CNN Films; Kartemquin Films; Film Rites
- Distributed by: Magnolia Pictures
- Release dates: January 19, 2014 (Sundance); July 4, 2014 (United States)
- Running time: 121 minutes
- Country: United States
- Language: English
- Box office: $815,645

Life Itself is a 2014 American biographical documentary film about Chicago film critic Roger Ebert, directed by Steve James and produced by Zak Piper, James and Garrett Basch. The film is based on Ebert's 2011 memoir of the same name. It premiered at the 2014 Sundance Film Festival and was an official selection at the 67th Cannes Film Festival. The 41st Telluride Film Festival hosted a special screening of the film on August 28, 2014. Magnolia Pictures released the film theatrically in the United States and simultaneously via video on demand platforms on July 4, 2014.

On December 2, 2014, the Academy of Motion Picture Arts and Sciences announced that the film was 1 of 15 films shortlisted in the Documentary Feature category for the 87th Academy Awards, but it was not nominated. It was also nominated for two News & Documentary Emmy Awards, winning the award for Outstanding Editing: Documentary & Long-Form.

== Structure ==
The film makes use of footage and interviews with American film critic Roger Ebert during the final months of his life interspersed with interviews of his friends, colleagues, and family including: Chaz Ebert (his wife), Martin Scorsese, Werner Herzog, Errol Morris, A.O. Scott, Jonathan Rosenbaum, Ramin Bahrani, Gregory Nava, Richard Corliss, and Ava DuVernay, among others. Voice actor Stephen Stanton impersonates Ebert and reads his writings. The film features clips from Ebert's popular television show with Gene Siskel, including outtakes, and their many appearances on shows like The Tonight Show Starring Johnny Carson and Late Night with David Letterman. The film also explores the relationship between Siskel and Ebert, Ebert's friendship with Russ Meyer and their collaboration on Beyond the Valley of the Dolls, as well as how Ebert ultimately came to transcend film criticism to become an influential cultural voice.

== Production ==
On September 7, 2012, a film adaptation of the 2011 memoir Life Itself was first announced by Ebert on Twitter: "Whoa! My memoir has been optioned for a doc by Steve James (Hoop Dreams), with Martin Scorsese and Steven Zaillian as exec producers."

Steve James said: "That's what made me want to do the movie: the way in which his life had this extraordinary desire for adventure and then, of course, he did his share of suffering and soldiering on. And all of that informed the kind of critic he became. It informed his reviews. It informed everything about who he was and what we came to collectively love about him."

On April 4, 2013, following Ebert's death, the filmmakers expressed their condolences and promised to finish the film. On November 20, 2013, an Indiegogo campaign was launched to raise money for the film. Over $150,000 was raised.

Locations seen in the film include the Alfred Caldwell Lily Pool, the Old Town Ale House, the Chateau Marmont, and Hotel Splendid.

== Release ==
On January 18, 2013, CNN Films announced that it had acquired the rights to air Life Itself on television. It premiered at the 2014 Sundance Film Festival. Magnolia Pictures released the film theatrically in the US on July 4, 2014. Dogwoof released the film in the UK on November 14, 2014. The film aired on CNN on January 4, 2015.

== Reception ==
Life Itself received universal acclaim from critics. On the review aggregator website Rotten Tomatoes, 98% of 203 critics' reviews are positive, with an average rating of 8.4/10. The website's consensus reads: "Rich in detail and warmly affectionate, Life Itself offers a joyful yet poignant tribute to a critical cinematic legacy." Metacritic, which uses a weighted average, assigned the film a score of 87 out of 100, based on 35 critics, indicating "universal acclaim".

Ann Hornaday of The Washington Post gave the film 3/4 stars and wrote: "You may not have agreed with Ebert's reviews — you may not have thought he was such a nice guy. But if you aren't moved by "Life Itself," you ought to have your heart examined." Kate Muir of The Times wrote: "Fans of the great populist film critic Roger Ebert will be both moved and amused by Life Itself". Peter Travers of Rolling Stone wrote: "Though Life Itself is a warts-and-all portrait Ebert didn't live to review, my guess is his thumbs would be shooting upward. Mine sure are."

Mark Kermode, writing for The Observer, gave it a score of 4/5 stars and wrote: "this lovely, insightful film is a splendidly watchable tribute to a truly cinematic life. I laughed, I cried; I was inspired and uplifted." Peter Bradshaw of The Guardian also gave the film 4/5 stars, describing it as "an inspiring documentary for critics, and anyone who loves cinema." Geoffrey Macnab of The Independent also gave the film 4/5 stars, writing: "A film about a movie critic might not sound an attractive proposition, but Steve James's biographical documentary... is deeply moving."

Antonia Quirke of the Financial Times was more critical, giving it a score of 2/5 and writing: "It's undercooked (we're not even told what movies he loved as a child) and a clip of the great New Yorker critic Pauline Kael speaking made me sit bolt upright thinking "Now you're talking."" Kristy Puchko of CinemaBlend gave the film 2.5/5 stars, writing: "Life Itself is ultimately nowhere near as inspiring, entertaining, or mirth-filled as the man himself. And for me, that is a profound and unforgivable disappointment."

== See also ==
- What She Said: The Art of Pauline Kael, the 2018 documentary film about film critic Pauline Kael
- Hoop Dreams, the 1994 documentary film Ebert championed
- Film criticism

== Bibliography ==
- Ebert, Roger (2011). Life Itself: A Memoir. New York City, NY: Grand Central Publishing. ISBN 978-0-4465-8497-5.
