= Ripley (TV series) =

American psychological thriller miniseries

- Promotional poster
- Genre: Psychological Thriller; Mystery; Neo-noir
- Created by: Steven Zaillian
- Based on: The Talented Mr. Ripley by Patricia Highsmith
- Written by: Steven Zaillian
- Directed by: Steven Zaillian
- Starring: Andrew Scott; Dakota Fanning; Johnny Flynn; Eliot Sumner; Margherita Buy; Maurizio Lombardi
- Music by: Jeff Russo
- Country of origin: United States
- Original languages: English; Italian
- No. of episodes: 8

Production
- Executive producers: Steven Zaillian; Garrett Basch; Clayton Townsend; Guymon Casady; Ben Forkner; Sharon Levy; Philipp Keel
- Producers: Andrew Scott; Enzo Sisti
- Cinematography: Robert Elswit
- Running time: 44–76 minutes
- Production companies: Endemol Shine North America; Entertainment 360; Diogenes Entertainment; FILMRIGHTS; Showtime Studios

Original release
- Network: Netflix
- Release: April 4, 2024

Ripley is an American neo-noir psychological thriller miniseries created, written and directed by Steven Zaillian, based on Patricia Highsmith's 1955 crime novel The Talented Mr. Ripley. Starring Andrew Scott as Tom Ripley, Dakota Fanning as Marge Sherwood and Johnny Flynn as Dickie Greenleaf, the eight-episode limited series is the first adaptation of Highsmith's novel to a series.

Ripley was set to air on Showtime, but in February 2023 the series was moved to Netflix. It premiered on April 4, 2024, and received critical praise for its writing, directing, craftsmanship, and performances, particularly for Scott as Tom Ripley. At the 76th Primetime Emmy Awards, it received 14 nominations, including Outstanding Limited or Anthology Series and acting nods for Scott and Fanning, and won four, including Outstanding Directing for a Limited or Anthology Series or Movie for Zaillian. The series also won a Peabody Award.

== Premise ==
In New York in 1961, Tom Ripley is a down-at-heel con-man. Unaware of his situation, a wealthy man hires him to convince his prodigal son to return home from Italy. But Tom's introduction to Dickie Greenleaf's comfortable and leisurely life abroad turns out to be "the first step into a complex life of deceit, fraud and murder".

== Cast ==
=== Main ===
- Andrew Scott as Tom Ripley
- Dakota Fanning as Marge Sherwood
- Johnny Flynn as Dickie Greenleaf
- Eliot Sumner as Freddie Miles
- Margherita Buy as Signorina Buffi, Ripley's landlady
- Maurizio Lombardi as Inspector Pietro Ravini

=== Guest ===
- Kenneth Lonergan as Herbert Greenleaf
- Ann Cusack as Emily Greenleaf
- Bokeem Woodbine as Alvin McCarron
- Vittorio Viviani as Matteo
- Louis Hofmann as Max Yoder
- Fisher Stevens as Edward T. Cavanagh
- John Malkovich as Reeves Minot

== Episodes ==
No.	Title	Directed by	Teleplay by	Original release date
1	"I A Hard Man to Find"	Steven Zaillian	Steven Zaillian	April 4, 2024
In New York City, in 1960, petty con artist Tom Ripley is approached by wealthy shipbuilder Herbert Greenleaf, who mistakes him for a friend of his spoiled, bohemian son, Dickie. After one of Tom's schemes falls apart, he accepts Herbert's offer to send him Italy to convince Dickie to return home after years abroad, supposedly writing and painting. Tom goes to Atrani, where he meets Dickie and his girlfriend, Marge, who is writing a travel book about Atrani. Tom becomes enamored with the handsome Dickie and his carefree lifestyle.
2	"II Seven Mercies"	Steven Zaillian	Steven Zaillian	April 4, 2024
Tom confesses to Dickie about his father's scheme. Dickie is charmed by Tom's apparent sincerity and invites him to stay at his villa. Dickie's friend Freddie Miles, a wealthy young English playwright, encounters the two at a cafe and becomes suspicious of Tom's motives. Freddie invites Dickie and Marge to spend Christmas with him skiing in Cortina. Tom writes to Mr. Greenleaf, claiming he is making progress on getting Dickie to return home, and requests more funds. Back at the villa, thinking he is alone, Tom puts on Dickie's clothing and begins imitating his mannerisms, when Dickie walks in and appears visibly annoyed. Dickie thinks Tom is infatuated with him, though Tom denies it.
3	"III Sommerso"	Steven Zaillian	Steven Zaillian	April 4, 2024
Tom receives a letter from Mr. Greenleaf, dismissing him from his task to persuade Dickie to return home. Dickie also receives a letter from his father telling him to be wary of Tom. Dickie offers to take Tom on a trip to Sanremo. They rent a small boat, and when they are far from shore, Dickie tells him that he and Marge are going to spend Christmas with Freddie in Cortina without him. When Dickie turns around to re-start the motor, Tom beats him to death with an oar. He ties the corpse to the boat's anchor, after removing and pocketing Dickie's personal accessories. When Tom attempts to dump the body overboard, his feet get caught in the anchor rope and he nearly drowns. He survives, and succeeds in heaving Dickie's body into the water. Back on shore, Tom submerges the boat, and wearing Dickie's ring, leaves Sanremo.
4	"IV La Dolce Vita"	Steven Zaillian	Steven Zaillian	April 4, 2024
Tom returns to Atrani and collects Dickie's personal effects, telling Marge that Dickie is now in Rome. Marge is skeptical. Tom sells some of Dickie's valuables and approaches a small-time mafioso, Carlo, about brokering the sale of Dickie's treasured sailboat. They disagree about their respective commissions, but eventually come to terms. Tom takes an apartment in Rome, where, using a doctored passport and having learned to forge Dickie's signature, he assumes his dead friend's identity and begins living his privileged life.
5	"V Lucio"	Steven Zaillian	Steven Zaillian	April 4, 2024
In Rome, Tom lives off Dickie's money. Using Dickie's portable typewriter (which has a distinctive "e" out of horizontal alignment), Tom composes letters to Marge and Dickie's parents to create the illusion that Dickie is still alive, but traveling while he takes stock of his life. Freddie, looking for Dickie, arrives unexpectedly in Rome at Tom's apartment and sees that he is impersonating Dickie. He knows about Tom's history as a petty criminal in New York, and intends to tell the authorities about Tom's scheme. As he heads for the door, Tom bludgeons him to death with a heavy glass ashtray. He drags the body downstairs, stuffs it in Freddie's Fiat 500, and leaves the car on the Via Appia, just out of town, before coming back to the apartment to clean up the bloodstains left on the stairs and elevator. He steals Freddie's ID documents and discards them down a sewer, before finally relaxing in his room. Unbeknownst to him, the apartment's resident cat leaves paw prints stained with Freddie's blood on some of the apartment stairs.
6	"VI Some Heavy Instrument"	Steven Zaillian	Steven Zaillian	April 4, 2024
The police discover Freddie's body and launch a murder inquiry. The incident makes front page news and Dickie is cited as a witness and possible suspect. Based on a tip from Freddie's lover, Max Yoder, Inspector Ravini interrogates Tom, thinking he is Dickie. Meanwhile, in Sanremo, the partially burned, submerged, blood-stained boat is discovered, further complicating the case. In Atrani, Marge discovers that Dickie's sailboat was sold and reads in the papers about Freddie's death. She goes to Rome to confront Tom about Dickie's whereabouts. Tom insists that Dickie has again left for a new destination. After Marge leaves, Tom decides to go to Palermo.
7	"VII Macabre Entertainment"	Steven Zaillian	Steven Zaillian	April 4, 2024
Inspector Ravini continues to investigate the case and searches Rome for Tom Ripley, whom he suspects may have been killed by Dickie in Sanremo. He believes Marge lied to him when she insisted that she saw Tom in Rome. Dickie's bank contacts Ravini over a signature mismatch on Dickie's monthly trust payout. Tom, writing as Dickie, resolves the matter with a letter, convincing the bank there was no fraud. The newspapers report that Tom Ripley is missing and that his disappearance might be connected to Freddie's murder. Tom leaves Palermo, giving up his apartment in Rome, and heads to Venice.
8	"VIII Narcissus"	Steven Zaillian	Steven Zaillian	April 4, 2024
In Venice, Tom rents a palazzo under his real name and informs the Venetian police he is alive. When Ravini arrives to interview him about the disappearance of Dickie and Freddie's murder, Tom successfully disguises himself so Ravini does not recognize him as Dickie. Tom is welcomed by Venice's high society, who are curious about Dickie, whom the press has dubbed the "fugitive playboy." Marge arrives and they attend a party together thrown by Pegeen Guggenheim. She discovers Dickie's ring in Tom's bedroom, but he manages to convince her Dickie gave it to him. Herbert arrives in Italy and accepts the story that a despondent Dickie committed suicide, depressed over his failure as an artist, his involvement in Freddie's death, and Tom's rejection of his romantic advances. Tom buys a doctored passport, changes identities and moves abroad (taking Dickie's stolen Picasso with him). Marge finishes her book about Atrani and sends a copy to Ravini. Thumbing through the book, the inspector is shocked when he sees a photo of the real Dickie Greenleaf.

== Production ==
=== Development ===
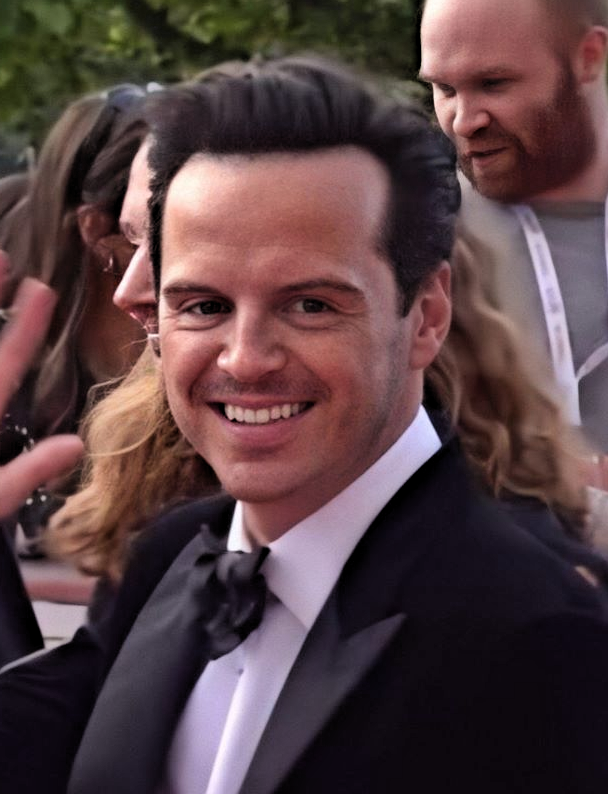
Andrew Scott is Tom Ripley

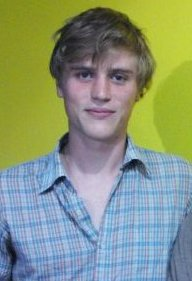
Johnny Flynn is Dickie Greenleaf

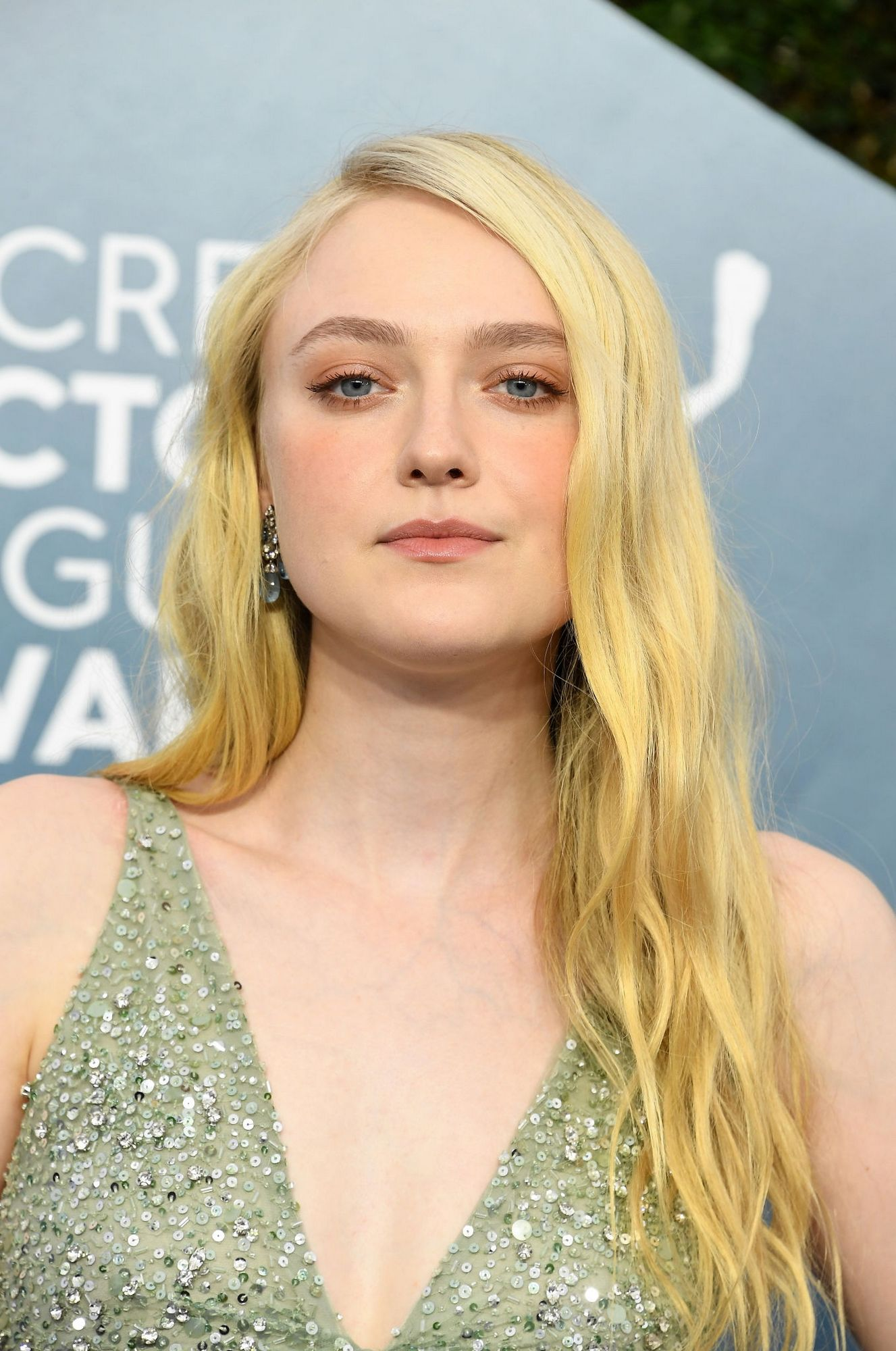
Dakota Fanning is Marge Sherwood

On September 25, 2019, it was announced that Andrew Scott had been cast as Tom Ripley in Ripley, a television series to be adapted from Patricia Highsmith's Ripley novels. A series order of eight episodes was commissioned by Showtime, to be written and directed by Steven Zaillian, who pitched the series to the network. He explained that adapting the material as a series rather than a feature film "allowed me to be more faithful to the story, tone, and subtleties of Highsmith's work. [I] tried to approach my adaptation in a way I imagined she might herself." Zaillian serves as executive producer alongside Garrett Basch, Guymon Casady, Ben Forkner, Sharon Levy, and Philipp Keel, with Scott as a producer. The series was co-produced by Showtime and Endemol Shine North America in association with Entertainment 360 and Filmrights. Though designed as a limited series, further seasons are a possibility.

=== Casting ===
The casting of Scott as Tom Ripley was announced in September 2019. Johnny Flynn was cast as Dickie Greenleaf in January 2020, and in March 2021, Dakota Fanning was cast as Marge Sherwood. Eliot Sumner joined the cast in a recurring role in December 2021. John Malkovich, who portrayed Ripley in the 2002 film Ripley's Game, was cast as Reeves Minot, a supporting character in Highsmith's later Ripley novels.

Scott said of his portrayal, "You don't play the opinions, the previous attitudes that people might have about Tom Ripley ... I have to have the courage to create our own version and my own understanding of the character ... It was a heavy part to play. I found it mentally and physically really hard". He described understanding what Ripley does as "arduous", explaining, "Certain things I can understand, but other things—it's actually the blankness that's sometimes hard to engage with."

=== Filming ===
Shooting was planned to begin in Italy in September 2020, but was later delayed to 2021 due to COVID-19. Robert Elswit was the cinematographer of all eight episodes, and shot with Arri Alexa LF digital cameras. Ripley is presented in black and white. The only things shown in color in the series are the red bloody paw prints of a cat on the steps at the end of episode 5. Zaillian explained, "The edition of the Ripley book I had on my desk had an evocative black-and-white photograph on the cover. As I was writing, I held that image in my mind. Black and white fits this story—and it's gorgeous."

== Release ==
Ripley was initially announced to be broadcast on Showtime, but in February 2023, Deadline Hollywood reported that the series would be moving to Netflix. It was released on April 4, 2024.

== Reception ==
=== Audience viewership ===
Ripley debuted at number six on Netflix's Top 10 TV English titles for the tracking week of 1-7 April 2024 with 16.9 million hours viewed. On the following week, it remained at the same position and garnered 18.4 million viewing hours.

=== Critical response ===
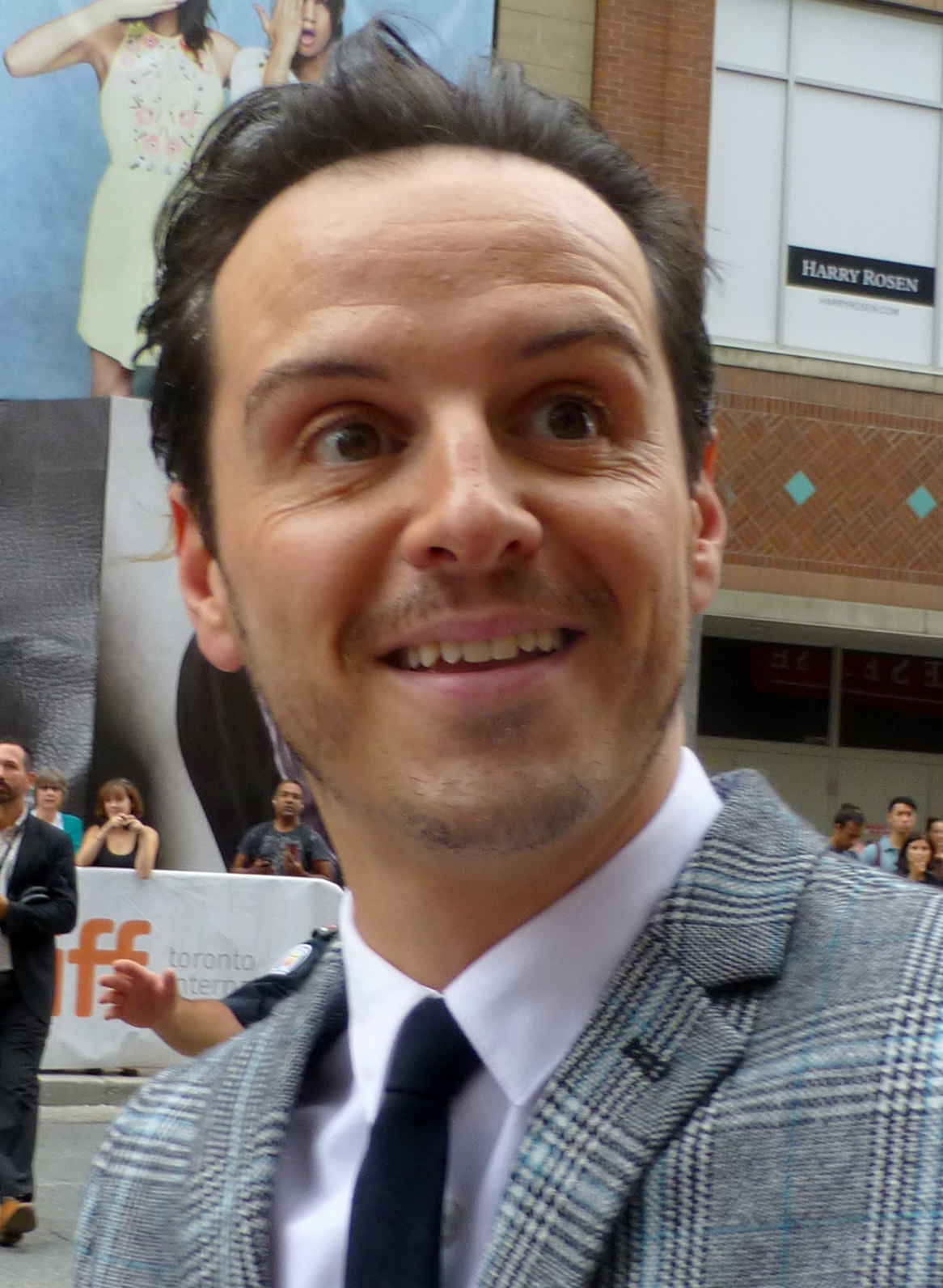
Scott's portrayal was called the best Ripley by some reviewers.

The review aggregator website Rotten Tomatoes reported an 86% approval rating with an average rating of 8.0/10, based on 136 critic reviews. The website's critics consensus reads, "Bathed in opulent black and white with a reptilian Andrew Scott holding the screen hostage, Steven Zaillian's sumptuous reinterpretation of Ripley draws fresh blood from Patricia Highsmith's insidious social climber." On Metacritic, the series holds a weighted average score of 76 out of 100 based on 43 critics, indicating "generally favorable" reviews.

Matt Schimkowitz of The A.V. Club gave the series an A− and said, "The fun of Ripley is always in how he gets away with his crimes, and Zaillian doesn't forget that." Reviewing the series for The Mercury News, Randy Myers gave a rating of 3.5/4 and commented, "While some might be put off by Ripley's measured tempo and its detached icicle of a protagonist, noir fans won't be and will admire how effectively it revives an often overworked genre." Linda Holmes of NPR described the series as "A meticulously built piece of filmmaking that references classic noir and Hitchcock as well as Italian cinema greats, and just looking at it shot by shot is a profound pleasure." Judy Berman of Time wrote, "Scott ... may be more than two decades older than his character as conceived by Highsmith (he doesn't look it) but has nonetheless given us the first definitive onscreen Ripley."

== Accolades ==
Award	Date of ceremony	Category	Nominee(s)	Result	Ref.
Gotham TV Awards	June 4, 2024	Breakthrough Limited Series	Ripley	Nominated	
Gotham TV Awards	June 4, 2024	Outstanding Performance in a Limited Series	Andrew Scott	Won	
TCA Awards	July 12, 2024	Program of the Year	Ripley	Nominated	
TCA Awards	July 12, 2024	Outstanding Achievement in Drama	Ripley	Nominated	
TCA Awards	July 12, 2024	Outstanding Achievement in Movies, Miniseries and Specials	Ripley	Nominated	
TCA Awards	July 12, 2024	Outstanding New Program	Ripley	Nominated	
TCA Awards	July 12, 2024	Individual Achievement in Drama	Andrew Scott	Nominated	
Set Decorators Society of America Awards	August 5, 2024	Best Achievement in Décor/Design of a Television Movie or Limited Series	Alessandra Querzola, David Gropman	Won	
Dorian TV Awards	August 12, 2024	Best TV Movie or Miniseries	Ripley	Nominated	
Dorian TV Awards	August 12, 2024	Most Visually Striking TV Show	Ripley	Won	
Dorian TV Awards	August 12, 2024	Best TV Performance – Drama	Andrew Scott	Nominated	
Astra TV Awards	December 8, 2024	Best Limited Series	Ripley	Nominated	
Astra TV Awards	December 8, 2024	Best Actor in a Limited Series or TV Movie	Andrew Scott	Won	
Astra TV Awards	December 8, 2024	Best Supporting Actress in a Limited Series or TV Movie	Dakota Fanning	Nominated	
Astra TV Awards	December 8, 2024	Best Directing in a Limited Series or TV Movie	Steven Zaillian	Nominated	
Primetime Emmy Awards	September 15, 2024	Outstanding Limited or Anthology Series	Steven Zaillian, Garrett Basch, Clayton Townsend, Guymon Casady, Benjamin Forkner, Philipp Keel, Sharon Levy, Charlie Corwin, Ben Rosenblatt, Enzo Sisti, and Andrew Scott	Nominated	
Primetime Emmy Awards	September 15, 2024	Outstanding Lead Actor in a Limited or Anthology Series or Movie	Andrew Scott	Nominated	
Primetime Emmy Awards	September 15, 2024	Outstanding Supporting Actress in a Limited or Anthology Series or Movie	Dakota Fanning	Nominated	
Primetime Emmy Awards	September 15, 2024	Outstanding Directing for a Limited or Anthology Series or Movie	Steven Zaillian	Won	
Primetime Emmy Awards	September 15, 2024	Outstanding Writing for a Limited or Anthology Series or Movie	Steven Zaillian	Nominated	
Primetime Creative Arts Emmy Awards	September 8, 2024	Outstanding Casting for a Limited or Anthology Series or Movie	Avy Kaufman, Francesco Vedovati, and Barbari Giordani	Nominated	
Primetime Creative Arts Emmy Awards	September 8, 2024	Outstanding Cinematography for a Limited or Anthology Series or Movie	Robert Elswit (for "V Lucio")	Won	
Primetime Creative Arts Emmy Awards	September 8, 2024	Outstanding Period Costumes	Maurizio Millenotti, Gianni Casalnuovo, Ernest Camilleri, Teresa D'Arienzo, and Francesco Morabito (for "IV La Dolce Vita")	Nominated	
Primetime Creative Arts Emmy Awards	September 8, 2024	Outstanding Picture Editing for a Limited or Anthology Series or Movie	Joshua Raymond Lee and David O. Rogers (for "III Sommerso")	Nominated	
Primetime Creative Arts Emmy Awards	September 8, 2024	Outstanding Production Design for a Narrative Period or Fantasy Program (One Hour or More)	David Gropman, Karen Schulz Gropman, Alex Santucci, and Alessandra Querzola	Nominated	
Primetime Creative Arts Emmy Awards	September 8, 2024	Outstanding Sound Editing for a Limited or Anthology Series, Movie or Special	Larry Zipf, Michael Feuser, Michael McMenomy, Lidia Tamplenizza, David Forshee, Bill R. Dean, Wyatt Sprague, Angelo Palazzo, Matt Haasch, Igor Nikolic, Dan Evans Farkas, Ben Schor, Jay Peck, and Sandra Fox (for "III Sommerso")	Won	
Primetime Creative Arts Emmy Awards	September 8, 2024	Outstanding Sound Mixing for a Limited or Anthology Series or Movie	Michael Barry, Larry Zipf, Maurizio Argentieri, and Michael Perfitt (for "VII Macabre Entertainment")	Nominated	
Primetime Creative Arts Emmy Awards	September 8, 2024	Outstanding Special Visual Effects in a Single Episode	John Bowers, Jason Tsang, Joseph Servodio, Maricel Pagulayan, Christopher White, Libby Hazell, Francois Sugny, Gaia Bussolati, and Pepe Valencia (for "III Sommerso")	Won	
Golden Globe Awards	January 5, 2025	Best Limited or Anthology Series or TV Film	Ripley	Nominated	
Golden Globe Awards	January 5, 2025	Best Actor - Miniseries or TV Film	Andrew Scott	Nominated	
Golden Globe Awards	January 5, 2025	Best Supporting Actress - TV	Dakota Fanning	Nominated	
Satellite Awards	January 26, 2025	Best Miniseries & Limited Series or Motion Picture Made for Television	Ripley	Won	
Satellite Awards	January 26, 2025	Best Actor in a Miniseries, Limited Series, or Motion Picture Made for Television	Andrew Scott	Nominated	
British Society of Cinematographers Awards	February 1, 2025	Best Cinematography in a Television Drama (International/Streaming)	Robert Elswit (for "V Lucio")	Nominated	
Saturn Awards	February 2, 2025	Best Television Presentation	Ripley	Nominated	
Costume Designers Guild Awards	February 6, 2025	Excellence in Period Television	Maurizio Millenotti and Gianni Casalnuovo (for "IV La Dolce Vita")	Nominated	
Critics Choice Awards	February 7, 2025	Best Limited Series	Ripley	Nominated	
Critics Choice Awards	February 7, 2025	Best Actor in a Limited Series or Movie Made for Television	Andrew Scott	Nominated	
Critics Choice Awards	February 7, 2025	Best Supporting Actress in a Limited Series or Movie Made for Television	Dakota Fanning	Nominated	
Directors Guild of America Awards	February 8, 2025	Outstanding Directing – Miniseries or TV Film	Steven Zaillian	Won	
Artios Awards	February 12, 2025	Outstanding Achievement in Casting – Limited Series	Avy Kaufman, Scotty Anderson, Francesco Vedovati, Barbara Giordani	Nominated	
Writers Guild of America Awards	February 15, 2025	Limited Series	Steven Zaillian	Nominated	
Cinema Audio Society Awards	February 22, 2025	Outstanding Achievement in Sound Mixing for Non-Theatrical Motion Pictures or Limited Series	Maurizio Argentieri, Michael Barry, Larry Zipf, Michael Perfitt, Scott Cannizzaro, Matthew Kay (for "III Sommerso")	Nominated	
Independent Spirit Awards	February 22, 2025	Best Lead Performance in a New Scripted Series	Andrew Scott	Nominated	
Golden Reel Awards	February 23, 2025	Outstanding Achievement in Sound Editing – Broadcast Long Form Dialogue and ADR	Michael Feuser, Lawrence Zipf, Lidia Tamplenizza, Michael McMenomy (for "V Lucio")	Nominated	
Golden Reel Awards	February 23, 2025	Outstanding Achievement in Sound Editing – Broadcast Long Form Effects and Foley	Michael Feuser, Lawrence Zipf, Bill R. Dean, Angelo Palazzo, Igor Nikolic, David Forshee, Wyatt Sprague, Matt Haasch, Sandra Fox, Steve Hammond, Goro Koyama, Andy Malcolm, Jay Peck (for "III Sommerso")	Won	
Golden Reel Awards	February 23, 2025	Outstanding Achievement in Music Editing – Broadcast Long Form	Dan Evans Farkas, Ben Schor (for "VIII Narcissus")	Nominated	
Screen Actors Guild Awards	February 23, 2025	Outstanding Performance by a Male Actor in a Miniseries or Television Movie	Andrew Scott	Nominated	
American Cinema Editors Awards	March 14, 2025	Best Edited Limited Series	Joshua Raymond Lee and David O. Rogers (for "V Lucio")	Nominated	
Peabody Awards	May 1, 2025	Entertainment	Showtime and Endemol Shine North America in association with Entertainment 360 and Filmrights for Netflix	Won	
