= Garrett Basch =

American film and television producer

- Citizenship: American
- Education: Tulane University
- Occupation: Producer

Garrett Basch is an American film and television producer. He is best known for his work on the Emmy-winning series The Night Of and What We Do in the Shadows, and for being the first producer ever to have three scripted shows nominated in the same year.

== Career ==
While attending Tulane University, Basch was hired by Oscar-winning writer/director Steven Zaillian as his assistant. The pair later formed Film Rites, a production company whose work included Moneyball, The Girl with the Dragon Tattoo, and the HBO limited series The Night Of. In addition to scripted content, Basch produced the documentary film Life Itself, for which he won the Producers Guild of America Award in 2015.

Although HBO initially passed on The Night Of, Basch was instrumental in saving the show by screening the pilot for Netflix and FX executives, sparking a bidding war that ultimately led HBO to order the limited series. He was nominated for a Primetime Emmy Award for Outstanding Limited Series for The Night Of in 2017. He was nominated again for Outstanding Comedy Series in 2020 and 2022 for FX's What We Do in the Shadows.

In 2022, Basch founded Dive, a production company whose projects include Taika Waititi's Next Goal Wins, What We Do in the Shadows, Reservation Dogs, Our Flag Means Death, Time Bandits, Interior Chinatown and Ripley. Basch received the Peabody Award twice for his work on FX's Reservation Dogs, first in 2022 and again in 2024. In August 2024, Basch became the first producer to have three scripted shows—What We Do in the Shadows, Reservation Dogs, and Ripley—nominated for the Emmys in the same year.

He received his third Peabody Award in 2025 for Ripley.

== Filmography ==
=== Film ===
Year	Film	Credit
2010	Welcome to the Rileys	Co-Producer
2011	Extraterrestrial	Executive Producer
2011	The Girl with the Dragon Tattoo	Production Executive
2012	The Cold Light of Day	Co-Producer
2014	Open Windows	Executive Producer
2016	Colossal	Executive Producer
2017	The Current War	Executive Producer
2018	Red Sparrow	Executive Producer
2018	Assassination Nation	Director Wishes to Thank
2019	The Irishman	Production Executive
2021	Those Who Wish Me Dead	Producer
2022	Deep Water	Executive Producer
2023	Next Goal Wins	Producer
2026	Klara and the Sun	Producer

=== Television ===
Year	Title	Credit	Notes
2016	The Night Of	Co-Executive Producer, Actor ("Ivan")	
2018	My Dinner with Hervé	Co-Executive Producer	Television film
2019	Diagnosis	Executive Producer	Documentary series
2020	Devs	Executive Producer	
2020	Dispatches from Elsewhere	Executive Producer	
2020	Barkskins	Executive Producer	
2021−23	Reservation Dogs	Executive Producer	
2019−23	What We Do in the Shadows	Executive Producer	
2022−23	Our Flag Means Death	Executive Producer	
2024	Ripley	Executive Producer	
2024	Time Bandits	Executive Producer	
2024	Interior Chinatown	Executive Producer	
2025	The Lowdown	Executive Producer	

== Awards ==
Year	Award	Category	Nominee(s)	Result
2014	Gotham Awards	Best Documentary	Life Itself	Nominated
2014	Gotham Awards	Audience Award	Life Itself	Nominated
2015	Producers Guild Awards	Outstanding Producer of Documentary	Life Itself	Won
2015	Critics Choice Awards	Best Documentary Feature	Life Itself	Won
2016	News & Documentary Emmy	Best Documentary	Life Itself	Nominated
2017	Producers Guild Awards	Outstanding Producer of Longform Television	The Night Of	Nominated
2017	BAFTA Awards	Best International	The Night Of	Nominated
2017	Golden Globes	Best Television Limited Series	The Night Of	Nominated
2017	Primetime Emmy	Outstanding Limited Series	The Night Of	Nominated
2017	AFI Awards	TV Program of the Year	The Night Of	Won
2020	Primetime Emmy	Outstanding Comedy Series	What We Do in the Shadows	Nominated
2021	Producers Guild Awards	Outstanding Producer of Episodic Television, Comedy	What We Do in the Shadows	Nominated
2021	Gotham Awards	Breakthrough Series	Reservation Dogs	Won
2021	Critics Choice Awards	Best Comedy Series	What We Do in the Shadows	Nominated
2022	Critics Choice Awards	Best Comedy Series	What We Do in the Shadows	Nominated
2022	Critics Choice Awards	Best Comedy Series	Reservation Dogs	Nominated
2022	Golden Globes	Best Television Series - Musical or Comedy	Reservation Dogs	Nominated
2022	Independent Spirit Awards	Best New Scripted Series	Reservation Dogs	Won
2022	Primetime Emmy	Outstanding Comedy Series	What We Do in the Shadows	Nominated
2022	Peabody Awards	Entertainment	Reservation Dogs	Won
2022	AFI Awards	TV Program of the Year	Reservation Dogs	Won
2023	Peabody Awards	Entertainment	Reservation Dogs	Nominated
2023	Peabody Awards	Entertainment	Our Flag Means Death	Nominated
2023	Critics Choice Awards	Best Comedy Series	Reservation Dogs	Nominated
2023	AFI Awards	TV Program of the Year	Reservation Dogs	Won
2024	Peabody Awards	Entertainment	Reservation Dogs	Won
2024	Primetime Emmy	Outstanding Comedy Series	Reservation Dogs	Nominated
2024	Primetime Emmy	Outstanding Comedy Series	What We Do in the Shadows	Nominated
2024	Primetime Emmy	Outstanding Limited Series	Ripley	Nominated
2025	AFI Awards	TV Program of the Year	The Lowdown	Won
2025	Peabody Awards	Entertainment	Ripley	Won
