= A Gifted Man =

- Genre: Medical drama; Supernatural; Fantasy
- Created by: Susannah Grant
- Starring: Patrick Wilson; Jennifer Ehle; Margo Martindale; Liam Aiken; Julie Benz; Pablo Schreiber; Rachelle Lefevre; Afton Williamson
- Theme music composer: W. G. Snuffy Walden
- Country of origin: United States
- Original language: English
- No. of seasons: 1
- No. of episodes: 16

Production
- Executive producers: Jonathan Demme; Susannah Grant; Sarah Timberman; Carl Beverly; Neal Baer
- Cinematography: Tom Weston
- Camera setup: Arri Alexa; Single-camera
- Running time: 44 minutes
- Production companies: Baer Bones; CBS Television Studios; Timberman-Beverly Productions

Original release
- Network: CBS
- Release: September 23, 2011 – March 2, 2012

A Gifted Man is an American fantasy medical drama television series that premiered on CBS on September 23, 2011. The series is about a talented but self-absorbed surgeon (Patrick Wilson) who starts questioning his purpose in life when he is visited by the spirit of his deceased ex-wife (Jennifer Ehle).

On May 10, 2012, CBS canceled the series after one season.

== Synopsis ==
Michael Holt (Patrick Wilson) is a talented but self-absorbed surgeon at an upscale New York City clinic. He lives a comfortable and materialistic life due to the wealthy clients he treats, but is nevertheless discontented with his life and acts coldly to those around him. His life is thrown into disarray, however, when he is visited by the ghost of his ex-wife Anna Paul (Jennifer Ehle), who was recently killed in a car crash. Anna asks Michael to help keep running the free clinic she previously directed, which leads Michael to be exposed to poorer patients in need who are far different from his usual clientele. Michael's sister Christina (Julie Benz), a single mother struggling to care for her troubled teenaged son Milo (Liam Aiken), believes in the supernatural and is thrilled with the idea that Anna is back in Michael's life, as she insists he was a better person when she was around.

== Cast and characters ==
=== Main cast ===
- Patrick Wilson as Dr. Michael Holt, a brilliant neurosurgeon and owner of Holt Neuro. Following Anna's death, he starts volunteering at Clinica Sanando.
- Jennifer Ehle as Anna Paul, Michael's ex-wife, who has come back as a spirit attached to him. She only appears to Michael.
- Margo Martindale as Rita Perkins-Hall, Michael's loyal, headstrong assistant. Rita is a former nurse.
- Pablo Schreiber as Anton Little Creek, a shaman and spiritual healer who helps Michael understand his otherworldly experiences. He is a longtime friend and former lover of Michael's sister Christina. Anton also works as a handyman at Clinica Sanando.
- Rachelle Lefevre as Dr. Kate Sykora, a doctor who takes over as director at Clinica Sanando after Anna's death.

=== Recurring cast ===
- Rhys Coiro as Dr. Zeke Barnes, a physician working at Clinica Sanando.
- Afton Williamson as Autumn, a social worker volunteering at Clinica Sanando.
- Julie Benz as Christina Holt, Michael's sister.
- Liam Aiken as Christina's son Milo Holt, Michael's nephew
- Eriq La Salle as Evan "E-Mo" Morris, a psychiatrist-neurologist at Holt Neuro and Michael's personal friend.
- Mike Doyle as Victor Lantz, the anesthesiologist at Holt Neuro.
- Adrian Martinez as Hector, the desk clerk at Clinica Sanando.
- Peter Hermann as Harrison Curtis, Kate's husband.
- Armando Riesco as Tavo
- Katie Ross as Maria, a nurse at Holt Neuro.
- Sue Jean Kim as Colette

== Production and broadcast ==
A Gifted Man is produced by CBS Television Studios and Timberman-Beverly Productions. Jonathan Demme, Susannah Grant, Sarah Timberman, Carl Beverly and Neal Baer are executive producers. Demme directed and Loucas George produced the pilot episode.

The first thirteen episodes were aired in the Friday 8:00 p.m. timeslot (September 23, 2011 – February 10, 2012), while the final three episodes of the 16 episode season order were aired in the Friday 9:00 p.m. timeslot (February 17, 2012 – March 2, 2012).

On November 14, 2011, CBS ordered three additional episodes of the series, bringing the total to 16 for the season.

== Episodes ==
With the exception of the pilot episode, every episode title begins with the words "In Case of...".

No.	Title	Directed by	Written by	Original release date	Prod. code	US viewers (millions)
1	"Pilot"	Jonathan Demme	Susannah Grant	September 23, 2011	101	9.45
After the ghost of his ex-wife visits him from the afterlife and asks him to help run her low income clinic, Michael Holt finds himself running back and forth between his patients at his neurological facility, Holt Neuro, and his less fortunate patients at the clinic.
2	"In Case of All Hell Breaking Loose"	Jonathan Kaplan	Neal Baer & Daniel Truly	September 30, 2011	102	8.18
Michael works double duty trying to save a pregnant friend he recently diagnosed with a brain tumor and a little boy with sickle cell disease.
3	"In Case of Discomfort"	Peter Werner	Jonathan Greene	October 7, 2011	103	7.52
While interviewing doctors to run the clinic and angering prospect Kate Sikora in the process, Michael helps a man who passed out, but who refuses care due to lack of insurance. Meanwhile, as Michael evaluates a woman, he notices lesions on her brain that require immediate surgery, even as he does not know the exact diagnosis.
4	"In Case of Separation Anxiety"	Jonathan Kaplan	Alison Tatlock	October 14, 2011	104	7.71
When Michael treats a patient who is hearing voices, he turns to Anton for help. Meanwhile, Kate’s first day at the clinic does not go well.
5	"In Case of Loss of Control"	David Platt	Daniel Truly	October 21, 2011	107	8.67
Michael enlists the help of a psychiatric consultant in diagnosing a problem involving a girl who is depressed over the death of her mother, but claims to be abstinent and not taking birth control. Meanwhile, a grant Kate has received for the clinic winds up needing to go to pay for an operation for an uninsured—and undocumented—boy.
6	"In Case of Memory Loss"	David Platt	Lisa Melamed	November 4, 2011	105	8.55
Michael brings a friend with a former drug habit and an unknown current problem to the clinic. While there, the friend runs away, but Michael encounters a former football player on whom he performed a surgery years earlier, but who has since become homeless and lost much of his memory. Meanwhile, a teenage girl is brought to Holt Neuro, due to problems coping with the recent murder of her best friend, and it's suggested that she take the beta-blocker propranolol to treat the condition. Notes: Nine months before this episode aired, former Bears and Giants player Dave Duerson, 50, shot himself in the chest and willed his brain to science to study the effects of brain injuries on football players, as did the character in this episode. Six months after this episode aired, former linebacker Junior Seau, 43, also shot himself in the chest, and his brain was donated to science.
7	"In Case of Exposure"	Peter Werner	Adam S. Simon	November 11, 2011	108	8.25
After his son comes to the clinic claiming to have received bruises on his back and front from a single fall skateboarding, a man is called in, but he shows violent behavior. He's determined to have a serious brain tumor causing emotional issues and impending death if left untreated. After Michael convinces him to let him perform surgery, he confesses that he was involved in a hit-and-run with a red-haired woman around the same time and place where Anna was killed, causing mixed emotions for Michael. Meanwhile, a FDNY firefighter is having emotional issues of her own following her failure to save teachers from a fire, and her anti-depressants are causing neurological issues.
8	"In Case of Missed Communications"	Donna Deitch	Jonathan Greene	November 18, 2011	109	8.24
Zeke and Kate treat an elderly man who is brought into the clinic not breathing. After intubating him, they find a DNR bracelet. Meanwhile, Rita's son returns home from Afghanistan, but is in a motorcycle accident causing spinal damage. Michael eventually learns that he too had a living will indicating that he not be kept alive by a machine.
9	"In Case of Abnormal Rhythm"	Constantine Makris	Becky Mode	December 2, 2011	106	8.01
An old patient brings her soon-to-be-wed daughter to Holt Neuro to be checked out due to passing out from stress. Though it turns out she's fine, her mother is having stroke symptoms requiring complicated surgery. Meanwhile at the clinic, a disoriented school teacher is found to have contracted rabies on a camping trip, and it's up to Michael and Kate to save her in time.
10	"In Case of a Bolt from the Blue"	John Coles	Dawn DeNoon	January 6, 2012	110	8.38
While working at the clinic during a blizzard, Michael starts exhibiting signs of a strangulated hernia that requires immediate surgery. In the beginning, Michael refuses care until he has symptoms of a severe case and calls Rita who calls a private ambulance for him. Instead, Michael lets the woman get taken to the hospital with a pregnant woman and her spouse and the ambulance leaves with Michael standing in the snow. After standing there for several minutes, he collapses with pain. When Kate comes out to look at the stars a few minutes later, she finds him and brings him inside and she and Zeke perform the surgery on him. Meanwhile, Michael has to help a woman who has memory confusion and a hypochondriac boy who is having hearing problems and later determined to have been struck by lightning.
11	"In Case of (Re)Birth"	Adam Bernstein	Lisa Melamed & Alison Tatlock	January 13, 2012	111	8.76
A 16-year-old runaway girl arrives at La Clinica and gives birth. Before delivering the placenta, she leaves only to come back once she experiences problems. Zeke finds out the father was killed and tries to convince the grandmother to take the baby so that he avoids foster care. Meanwhile at Holt Neuro, an artist has a brain tumor that has recently given him creativity but headaches as well. Mike wishes to remove it via surgery, while Emo feels that there are other options to control its growth while keeping the tumor intact so it can continue to provide inspiration.
12	"In Case of Blind Spots"	Peter Leto	Zachary Lutsky	February 3, 2012	112	8.41
Emo becomes more forgetful, and Michael puts his foot down and decides to force him to get tested for Huntington's. Meanwhile, Kate's "Little Sister" is having unexplained impingement in her back which is preventing her from playing in a game which will be watched by college scouts, and a man that Michael rescues from the East River is experiencing dissociative and violent withdrawal symptoms and eventually blindness.
13	"In Case of Complications"	Ed Ornelas	Daniel Truly & Jonathan Greene	February 10, 2012	113	8.78
Michael testifies in a court case regarding a man who set a deadly fire to a complex before having a tumor removed. This has implications later at La Clinica when someone related to a victim visits and impedes the transport of a man who needs an ambulance to the hospital and more serious consequences for Anton. Michael is reminded by Rita and Anna that Kate is a married woman.
14	"In Case of Co-Dependants"	Eriq LaSalle	Dawn DeNoon	February 17, 2012	114	9.54
A 23-year-old pop star (Christina Milian) comes to Holt Neuro experiencing headaches and other symptoms that prevented her from performing well at her first come-back concert. A little girl, who can see the ghost of her grandmother, and her mother develop similar symptoms, and it turns out that there is a connection. Rita reveals how she came to leave nursing and work for Michael. Meanwhile, Anton is having post-traumatic-stress-disorder-like symptoms following his shoulder injury and is developing strange symptoms in the opposite arm, requiring a strange remedy. Kate's husband is angry that she continues to work at La Clinica after being offered a safer and more stable job, leading him to go to somewhat extreme measures.
15	"In Case of Letting Go"	Constantine Makris	Alison Tatlock & Lisa Melamed	February 24, 2012	115	9.05
Michael's ex-girlfriend appears in his practice with a severe brain injury. He operates and she suddenly loses memory to when she was dating Michael. Meanwhile, a member of Zeke's band gets an unidentified infection that needs immediate attention.
16	"In Case of Heart Failure"	David Platt	Neal Bear & Daniel Truly	March 2, 2012	116	9.70
In the series finale, Michael learns that a patient at the clinic has a special connection to Anna. Meanwhile, Michael reunites with an old friend who is suffering from a rare illness.

== Reception ==
During an early review of the pilot episode, HitFix writer Daniel Fienberg praised the cast as well as Demme's direction, although he questioned whether the show would be as good without Demme and feared the premise could become predictable.

The show was given a 65 out of 100 on Metacritic, indicating generally favorable reviews. David Hinckley of the New York Daily News gave the show three stars out of five, saying "The cast here nails their roles, from Wilson down to support players like Emmy winner Margo Martindale as his loyal assistant, Rita. Ehle has a much trickier role and handles it well. It’s a show that wants to say something. Now it needs viewers who want to listen." Mary McNamara of the Los Angeles Times said "with just a few tiny modifications, A Gifted Man could be a smart satiric comedy, but I don’t think that is what Grant is shooting for," poking fun at Julie Benz's character's cosmic beliefs and dysfunctional family. Matthew Gilbert of The Boston Globe compared the show to Grey's Anatomy, saying "[the show] needs to transcend that limited and overused construct, and set the characters free from endless debate over whether Anna is real or not. Let the actors find drama in more earthly concerns. I think they’re up to it." Robert Bianco of USA Today says "Wilson has the magnetism and acting chops to lead a network series. [A Gifted Man] could not have been given better actors. It needs to give them better in return." Phil Dyess-Nugent and Emily VanDerWerff of The A.V. Club gave the pilot a B rating.

=== Ratings ===
Season	Timeslot	Season premiere	Season finale	TV Season	Ranking	Viewers (in millions)
1	Friday 8 p.m. (September 23, 2011 – February 10, 2012); Friday 9 p.m. (February 17, 2012 – March 2, 2012)	September 23, 2011	March 2, 2012	2011–2012	#60	8.63

== See also ==
- List of ghost films
- Saving Hope
