= Old Town Ale House, Chicago =

Saloon in Chicago, Illinois, US

Coordinates: 41°54′39.3″N 87°38′7.9″W

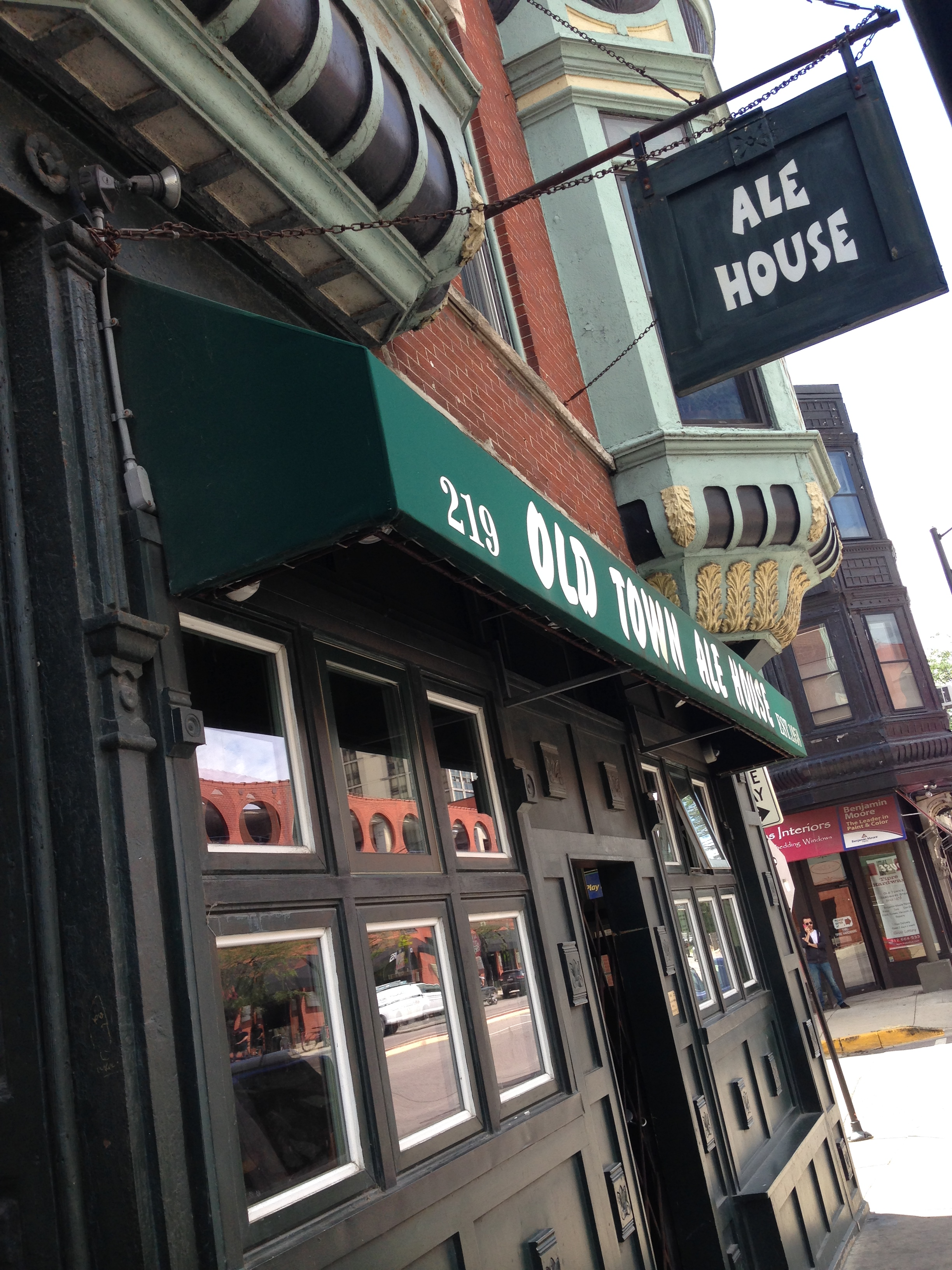
Old Town Ale House, Chicago

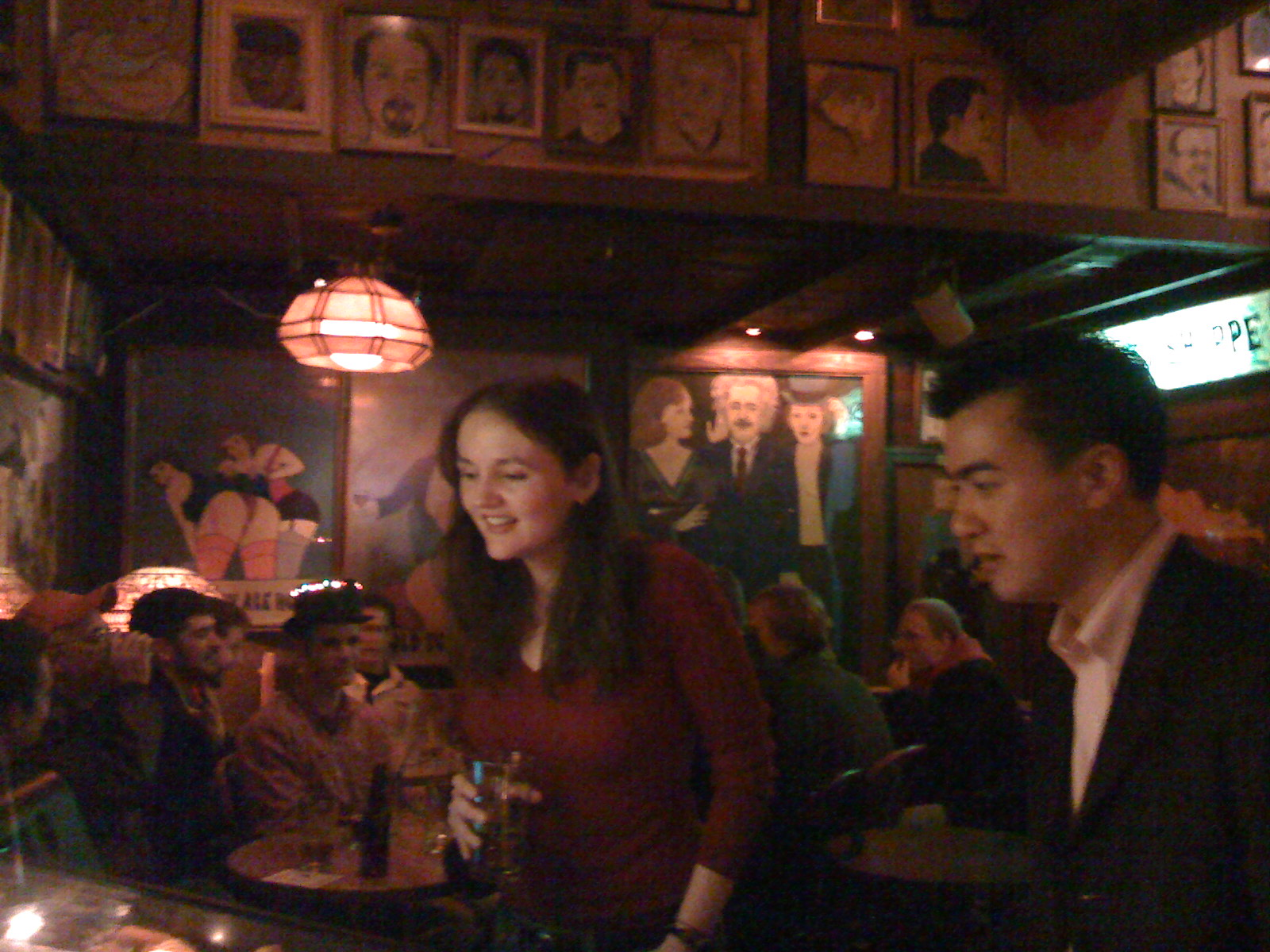
2008 photo inside the bar

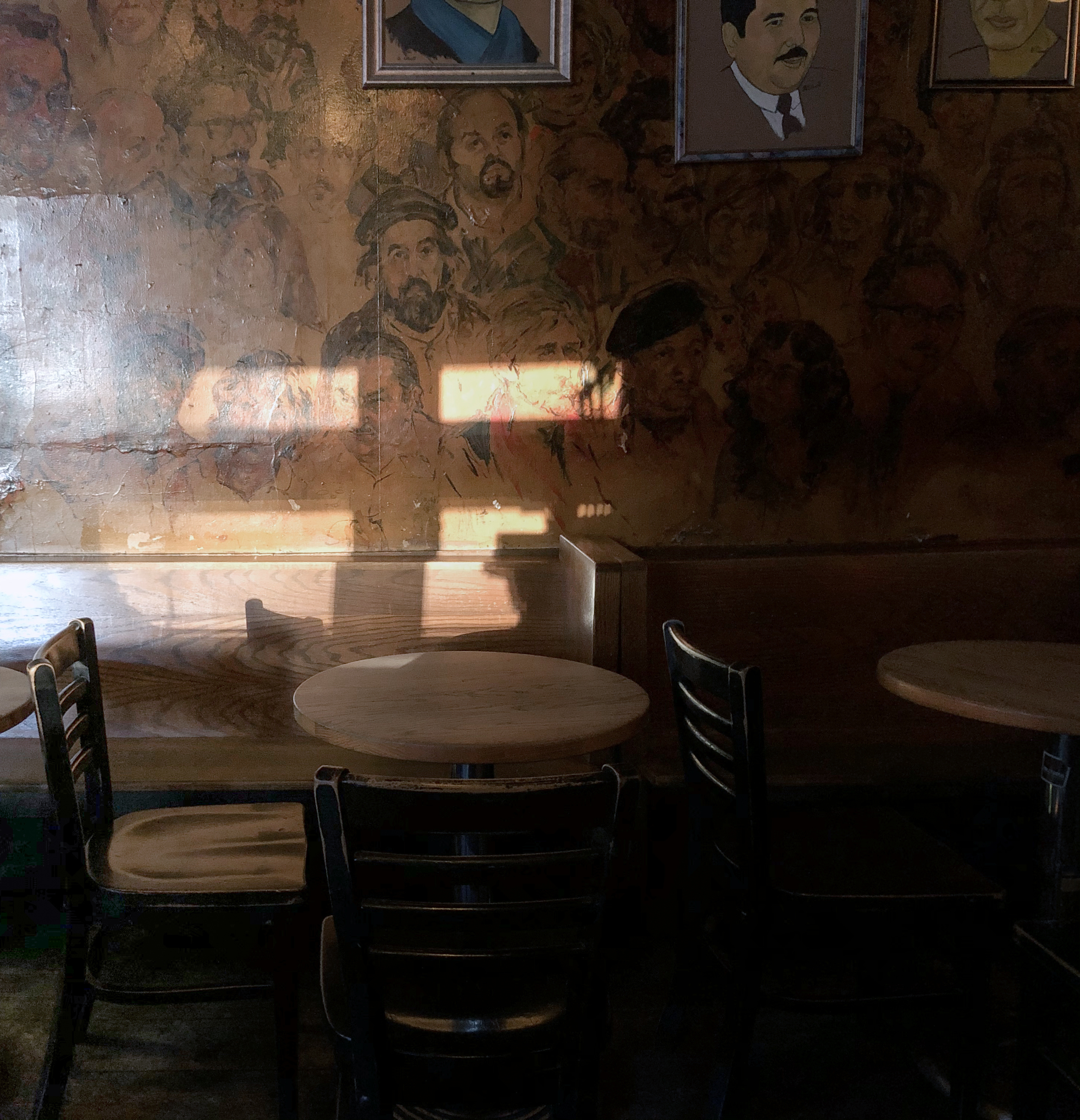
Seating in the bar

The Old Town Ale House is a saloon in the Old Town neighborhood of Chicago, United States, that has been in operation since 1958. It is currently located at 219 W. North Avenue.

== Bruce Elliott and his paintings ==
Bruce Elliott is a painter and the current owner of the bar. Elliott inherited the bar from a previous owner on the condition that the bar not be changed. The walls of the bar are filled with portraits of regular bar-goers and famous patrons (such as Stephen Colbert, Bill Murray, John Belushi and Dan Aykroyd—many of whom had been working at the Second City Theatre also located on Wells and North Avenue). Other paintings include lewd political satire of well-known people such as Rod Blagojevich being strip searched, Sarah Palin posing naked on a polar bear rug, Vladimir Putin dancing as a ballerina or Kim Jong Un and Dennis Rodman in handcuffs (also painted by Elliott).

The Old Town Ale House has been called "The best bar in the world that I know about" by Roger Ebert whose biographical film Life Itself contains several interviews within the bar, and ends with a portrait of Ebert in the bar that was painted by Elliott.
