= Hell's Kitchen (1998 film) =

- Directed by: Tony Cinciripini
- Written by: Tony Cinciripini
- Produced by: Tony Cinciripini; Thomas DiGaetano; Randy Gardner
- Starring: Rosanna Arquette; William Forsythe; Angelina Jolie; Mekhi Phifer; Johnny Whitworth
- Cinematography: Michael Spiller
- Edited by: Steve Silkensen
- Music by: Joseph Arthur
- Production company: HK Film Corporation
- Distributed by: The Kushner-Locke Company
- Release dates: September 11, 1998 (Canada); December 3, 1999 (USA)
- Running time: 95 minutes
- Country: United States
- Language: English
- Box office: $22,513

Hell's Kitchen is a 1998 American crime drama film starring Rosanna Arquette, William Forsythe, Angelina Jolie, Mekhi Phifer, and Johnny Whitworth. The film was written and directed by Tony Cinciripini. The film had a budget of $6,000,000 but grossed only $4,322 on its opening weekend.

== Plot summary ==
When a robbery goes awry, the bandits end up accidentally killing one of their own. Johnny, one of the robbers, goes to jail for five years. His ex-girlfriend, Gloria, holds him responsible for the death of her brother, the one killed during the robbery. Upon Johnny's release, she wants her new boyfriend to kill him. Only trouble is, the boyfriend knows it wasn't Johnny's fault, and can't bring himself to kill him. Meanwhile, Johnny tries to turn his life around by becoming a boxer and training under a former heavyweight contender.

== Cast ==
- Rosanna Arquette as Liz, Gloria and Hayden's mother
- William Forsythe as Lou, Johnny's trainer and a former heavyweight contender
- Angelina Jolie as Gloria, Johnny's ex-girlfriend
- Mekhi Phifer as Johnny, an ex-con
- Johnny Whitworth as Patty, one of the bandits
- Ryan Slater as Hayden, Gloria's younger brother who was killed during a robbery

== Reception ==
The film received mixed reviews. It holds a 40% rating on Rotten Tomatoes based on 5 reviews.
