= Still Here (film) =

American drama film

- Theatrical release poster
- Directed by: Vlad Feier
- Screenplay by: Vlad Feier; Peter Gutter
- Story by: Vlad Feier
- Produced by: Ana Paula Rivera; Vlad Feier; Regina Bang; Javier del Olmo
- Starring: Johnny Whitworth; Maurice McRae; Afton Williamson; Jeremy Holm; Zazie Beetz; Larry Pine
- Cinematography: Ana Paula Rivera
- Edited by: Georg Petzold; Steve McClean
- Music by: Jeff Kryka
- Production company: Atelier 44
- Distributed by: Blue Fox Entertainment
- Release date: August 28, 2020
- Running time: 99 minutes
- Country: United States
- Language: English

Still Here is a 2020 American crime drama film co-written and directed by Vlad Feier. It stars Johnny Whitworth, Maurice McRae, Afton Williamson, Jeremy Holm, Zazie Beetz, and Larry Pine. The film is based on true events.

The film was released in the United States on August 28, 2020, by Blue Fox Entertainment.

== Premise ==
Set in today's New York, the film follows the heartbreaking story of a missing 12-year-old girl and the pain of her family.

== Cast ==
- Johnny Whitworth as Christian Baker
- Afton Williamson as Tiffany Watson
- Maurice McRae as Michael Watson
- Zazie Beetz as Keysha
- Larry Pine as Jeffrey Hoffman
- Jeremy Holm as Greg Spaulding
- Gia Crovatin as Paige Sullivan
- Danny Johnson as Anthony Evans
- Rupert Simonian as Sam Perkin

== Production ==
Filming took place in New York City, Brooklyn and Long Island. Johnny Whitworth plays the young journalist Christian Baker. Afton Williamson, Zazie Beetz and Larry Pine set to appear in Still Here.

== Release ==
Blue Fox Entertainment acquired the worldwide rights for the film at the European Film Market during the 70th edition of Berlin International Film Festival. It was given a limited release on August 28, 2020, then debuted on video on demand on September 4, 2020.

=== Critical reception ===
Still Here currently holds a 25% approval rating on review aggregator website Rotten Tomatoes, based on 8 reviews, with an average of 4.4/10.
