= The Night Of =

American crime drama television miniseries by HBO

- Genre: Crime drama
- Created by: Richard Price; Steven Zaillian
- Based on: Criminal Justice by Peter Moffat
- Written by: Richard Price; Steven Zaillian
- Directed by: Steven Zaillian; James Marsh
- Starring: John Turturro; Riz Ahmed; Bill Camp; Payman Maadi; Poorna Jagannathan; Sofia Black-D'Elia; Afton Williamson; Ben Shenkman; Jeannie Berlin; Paul Sparks; Ned Eisenberg; Nabil Elouahabi; Michael Kenneth Williams; Glenne Headly; Amara Karan; Kirk "Sticky Fingaz" Jones; Mohammad Bakri; Ashley Thomas; Paulo Costanzo; Chip Zien; Glenn Fleshler
- Composer: Jeff Russo
- Country of origin: United States
- Original language: English
- No. of episodes: 8

Production
- Executive producers: Steven Zaillian; Richard Price; Jane Tranter; James Gandolfini; Peter Moffat; Garrett Basch
- Producers: Mark A. Baker (pilot); Scott Ferguson
- Production locations: Manhattan; New York City
- Cinematography: Robert Elswit (pilot); Frederick Elmes; Igor Martinović
- Editors: Jay Cassidy (pilot); Nick Houy
- Camera setup: Single-camera
- Running time: 56–96 minutes
- Production companies: BBC Worldwide Productions; Bad Wolf; Filmrights

Original release
- Network: HBO
- Release: July 10 – August 28, 2016

The Night Of is a 2016 American eight-part crime drama miniseries based on the first series of Criminal Justice, a 2008 British series. The miniseries was written by Richard Price and Steven Zaillian (based on the original Criminal Justice plot by Peter Moffat), and directed by Zaillian and James Marsh. Broadcast on HBO, The Night Of premiered on July 10, 2016 to critical acclaim. The first episode premiered on June 24, 2016, via HBO's on-demand services. The Night Of received 14 Emmy nominations, winning five, including Outstanding Lead Actor for Riz Ahmed.

== Cast ==
=== Starring ===
- John Turturro as John Stone, a lawyer who represents Nasir Khan
- Riz Ahmed as Nasir "Naz" Khan, a Pakistani-American college student accused of murdering a woman on the Upper West Side of New York City
- Michael Kenneth Williams as Freddy Knight, an influential prisoner at Rikers Island
- Bill Camp as Detective Sergeant Dennis Box, the lead detective on Nasir's case
- Jeannie Berlin as Helen Weiss, a district attorney working on Nasir's case
- Payman Maadi as Salim Khan, Nasir's father
- Poorna Jagannathan as Safar Khan, Nasir's mother
- Glenne Headly as Alison Crowe, a lawyer who represents Nasir Khan
- Amara Karan as Chandra Kapoor, Alison's employee
- Ashley Thomas as Calvin Hart, a prisoner at Rikers Island
- Paul Sparks as Don Taylor, Andrea's stepfather
- Sofia Black-D'Elia as Andrea Cornish, the victim
- Afton Williamson as Wiggins, a police officer working at the 21st precinct
- Ben Shenkman as Klein, a sergeant working at 21st precinct
- Chip Zien as Katz, a pathologist
- Paulo Costanzo as Ray Halle, financial adviser to Andrea and her mother
- Ned Eisenberg as Lawrence Felder, a judge
- Kirk "Sticky Fingaz" Jones as Walker, a prisoner at Rikers Island
- Glenn Fleshler as Judge Roth
- Mohammad Bakri as Tariq, a taxi driver and Salim's colleague
- Nabil Elouahabi as Yusuf, a taxi driver and Salim's colleague

=== Supporting ===
- Frank L. Ridley as Jerry
- Jeff Wincott as Lucas
- Fisher Stevens as Saul
- Lord Jamar as Tino
- Ariya Ghahramani as Amir Farik
- Syam Lafi as Hasan Khan
- Max Casella as Edgar
- J. D. Williams as Trevor Williams
- Frank Wood as Harry
- Skipp Sudduth as Bell
- Kevin Dunn as Danny Lang
- Joe Egender as "Cutty" Cutler
- Mustafa Shakir as Victor
- Don Harvey as Detective Tomalikis

== Production ==
On September 19, 2012, it was announced that HBO had ordered a pilot based on the British television series Criminal Justice. James Gandolfini was set to star, Richard Price would write the project, and Steven Zaillian would direct. On February 19, 2013, HBO passed on the project. However, on May 13, 2013, HBO reversed course, picking up Criminal Justice as a seven-part limited series. After Gandolfini's death on June 19, 2013, it was reported that the miniseries would move forward in his honor, and that Robert De Niro was set to replace Gandolfini. On April 21, 2014, John Turturro replaced De Niro because of scheduling conflicts. On March 11, 2016, it was announced that the project would premiere in the middle of 2016 under the title The Night Of. Gandolfini retains a posthumous executive producer credit.

In July 2016, Steven Zaillian commented about the possibility of a second season: "We're thinking about it and if we come up with something we all feel is worthy of doing, we'll do it. This was designed as a stand-alone piece. That being said, there are ways of certainly kind of taking what it feels like and what it's about and doing another season on another subject." In April 2017, Zaillian again commented on the possibility of a second season, saying: "Listen, we would love to do it, and when I say 'we,' I mean [co-creator] Richard Price and myself. If we can come up with something that we fall in love with, we'll do it. If we don't, we won't." In August 2017, John Turturro talked about the possibility of returning for season two: "We've been talking. So we'll see. I would be very interested because I felt that character offered something really rich. I'm hoping that that will come to fruition."

In January 2020, John Turturro stated that new episodes of The Night Of are still a possibility: "We have a couple of ideas but we have to sit down and discuss them, so we're at that stage so that's good."

== Episodes ==
No.	Title	Directed by	Teleplay by	Original release date	U.S. viewers (millions)
1	"The Beach"	Steven Zaillian	Richard Price	June 24, 2016 (online); July 10, 2016 (HBO)	0.774
In October 2014, Nasir "Naz" Khan is a naive Pakistani-American college student living in Queens, New York. After stealing his father's cab one night with the intention to attend a popular party, Naz picks up a young woman, Andrea, and ends up canceling his plans to attend the party so he can spend the evening with her. After a night of sex and drugs with Andrea, Naz wakes and finds her stabbed to death in her bedroom; he has no recollection of what happened. Naz leaves the scene but is arrested for a minor traffic violation shortly thereafter. At the station, he declines to answer calls to his mobile phone from his parents, who are worried about him and trying to reach him. When searching Naz, the police find a knife matching the suspected murder weapon in his pocket, and witnesses identify him. Naz is interrogated by detective Dennis Box and eventually asks for a lawyer, but one is not provided, until world-weary defense attorney John Stone hears of the case and steps in to represent Naz.
2	"Subtle Beast"	Steven Zaillian	Richard Price	July 17, 2016	1.28
Stone continues to tell Naz to stop telling him "the truth" of what happened and to keep quiet. Det. Box returns to the crime scene to gather more evidence. He has Don Taylor, Andrea's stepfather, come in and identify the body, which Taylor does reluctantly. Det. Box questions him to get any possible information. Naz is visited by his parents in the precinct, and their conversation is recorded. Det. Box talks with Naz again, and when Naz won't make a confession, he charges him with homicide. Naz is then sent to Manhattan Central Booking, next to arraignment court, where he pleads not guilty, and finally to Rikers Island to await prosecution.
3	"A Dark Crate"	Steven Zaillian	Richard Price	July 24, 2016	1.20
Naz is processed at Rikers Island. Stone speaks with Naz's parents regarding legal fees and offers a flat fee of $50,000, but they can't afford him. Another attorney, Alison Crowe, interested in the media attention on the case, offers the Khans her services pro bono. Naz's father, who shares the taxi with two others, is unable to work due to the taxi being evidence in the crime, and his only option of getting it back would be to file grand theft charges against his son. Stone visits Naz in prison, where he learns that he's no longer Naz's lawyer. Freddy, an inmate with special privileges, offers his protection to Naz, but he declines. In the middle of the night, Naz uses the bathroom, and when he comes back, he finds his bed set on fire.
4	"The Art of War"	James Marsh	Richard Price	July 31, 2016	1.34
After having his arm cut by another prisoner, Naz meets with Freddy again, and Freddy tells him he wants to help Naz because Naz's intelligence is refreshing. Later, Naz witnesses Freddy beat a prisoner up in the exercise room. Meanwhile, Stone attends Andrea's funeral and learns about a drug rehab center she attended. He pays off a man named Edgar for her files. Crowe meets with Naz and tries to convince him to accept a plea bargain, agreeing to a lesser charge of manslaughter and a 15-year sentence. However, Crowe's assistant, Chandra, encourages him to refuse. At the hearing, Naz voids the plea and maintains his innocence. Crowe drops the case and hands it over to Chandra before informing the Khans that it will no longer be pro bono. After the hearing, Naz is attacked by Calvin, a prisoner he had earlier befriended. He finally decides to ask Freddy for protection.
5	"The Season of the Witch"	Steven Zaillian	Richard Price & Steven Zaillian	August 7, 2016	1.37
Now under the protection of Freddy, Naz has his own personal cell. Later, Freddy has Calvin laid down in the shower for Naz to retaliate for what he did. Naz brutally beats Calvin after he calls Naz a "faggot". Stone officially joins Chandra on the case after working out a fee. Det. Box makes a map of Naz's movements from the night of and shares it with Helen Weiss, the prosecutor. In the surveillance camera footage, Weiss sees Naz accept Andrea as a passenger after refusing two men, suggesting premeditation. They also discover that Naz had amphetamines in his system, which Andrea did not. Meanwhile, Naz smuggles cocaine into Rikers for Freddy. One of the witnesses, Trevor Williams, is brought in again for questioning. After learning from Naz that there was another man with Trevor (which Trevor had lied about), Stone questions Trevor about the other man. He finds out it's Duane Reade, a man with a criminal record who always uses a knife. Stone goes after Reade, but loses him in a foot chase.
6	"Samson and Delilah"	Steven Zaillian	Richard Price & Steven Zaillian	August 14, 2016	1.41
Naz's parents are forced to take menial jobs as a result of fallout from his case. Freddy gives Naz a cell phone, both to talk to his family as well as a way to receive bribes from other prisoners for its use. Det. Box learns from Naz's high school basketball coach that Naz transferred to another high school after he pushed another boy down a flight of stairs, seemingly unprovoked; Naz defends his actions as a lashing out against bullying after September 11. Meanwhile, Chandra views security footage from the night of and sees a hearse driver, Mr. Day, who spoke to Andrea and later followed Naz out of a gas station. She speaks to him and he explains that he viewed Andrea as predatory and similar to Delilah; Chandra becomes suspicious of him. Stone learns that Andrea was able to live in an upscale townhouse due to wealth from her late mother, Evelyn. He speaks to Evelyn's financial adviser, who tells him that Andrea's stepfather, Don, has a violent history and is known for attempting to siphon wealth from much older women. Stone also learns that shortly before Andrea died, she refused to give Don her portion of Evelyn's wealth. Stone finds Don in a gym, training and flirting with an older woman.
7	"Ordinary Death"	Steven Zaillian	Richard Price & Steven Zaillian	August 21, 2016	1.76
At Naz's trial, a doctor who had been prepped by Weiss testifies that the wounds on Naz's hand implicate him in a multiple stabbing. However, Dr. Katz, another medical expert, disputes the claims. It is also revealed that Naz injured a second boy in high school, and in college, he sold Adderall to other students for a significant profit. Stone learns more suspicious information about Don and joins his gym in an attempt to spy on him. Don discovers this, and threatens Stone and his family to stay away. During a meeting, Chandra and Naz kiss, which Chandra regrets immediately. Meanwhile, Stone becomes suspicious about Box's removal of Naz's inhaler from the crime scene and subpoenas him. During the resulting testimony, Chandra tells Box she believes he doubts Naz's guilt. Naz finds a young prisoner named Petey, who was earlier raped by another prisoner named Victor, has died by suicide. Naz tells Freddy, who kills Victor with a razor.
8	"The Call of the Wild"	Steven Zaillian	Richard Price & Steven Zaillian	August 28, 2016	2.16
Trevor, Reade, Day, and Don testify at Naz's trial, and each proclaim their innocence. Against Stone's wishes, Naz testifies, and it goes poorly; he forgets certain details and even expresses doubts over his own innocence. Freddy sends Stone a tape of Naz and Chandra kissing in hopes of forcing a mistrial, but it only results in Crowe firing Chandra and Stone being made lead attorney. Meanwhile, Det. Box learns from security footage that Andrea was being followed by a man he eventually identifies as Ray Halle, Evelyn's financial adviser; Box believes Halle was Andrea's boyfriend. Halle also had violent tendencies and was seen at the scene of the crime. Box speaks with Halle and brings the evidence to Weiss, but she chooses to continue with the trial. Stone prepares his closing arguments while battling a recurrence of his eczema. After Stone's closing, the jury becomes deadlocked, leading Weiss to drop the charges against Naz. Naz returns home to tense relationships with his family and friends, continuing his drug habits from prison. Box and Weiss pursue Halle. Stone goes to meet with his next potential client.

== Reception ==
=== Critical reception ===
The Night Of received critical acclaim. On Metacritic, it has a weighted average score of 90 out of 100, indicating "universal acclaim" based on 40 reviews. It has a score of 94% on Rotten Tomatoes with an average rating of 8.6/10 based on 88 reviews; its consensus reads, "The Night Of is a richly crafted, exquisitely performed mystery that will keep viewers enthralled and leave them devastated."

IGN reviewer Jesse Schedeen gave the entire miniseries an 8.9 out of 10 "Great" score, writing, "With only a couple of exceptions, this summer hasn't been the greatest when it comes to new TV series, which makes The Night Of's brief run all the more special. This limited series did little to shake up the formula when it [comes to] crime dramas, but it was distinguished by its amazing cast and the pervasive tension that drove the series from start to finish."

=== Accolades ===
Year	Award	Category	Nominee(s)	Result	Ref.
2016	Camerimage	Best Pilot	Robert Elswit (for "The Beach")	Won	
2017	American Cinema Editors Awards	Best Edited Miniseries or Motion Picture for Television	Jay Cassidy (for "The Beach")	Nominated	
2017	American Film Institute Awards	Top 10 Television Programs of the Year		Won	
2017	American Society of Cinematographers Awards	Outstanding Achievement in Cinematography in Television Movie, Miniseries, or Pilot	Igor Martinovic (for "Subtle Beast")	Won	
2017	Art Directors Guild Awards	Excellence in Production Design Award – Television Movie or Mini-series	Patrizia von Brandenstein, Fredda Slavin, Bobby Berg, Hudson Meredith, Peter Hackman, and Melanie J. Baker (for "The Beach")	Won	
2017	Banff World Media Festival	Television Miniseries		Won	
2017	Black Reel Awards	Outstanding Supporting Actor, TV Movie or Limited Series	Michael Kenneth Williams	Nominated	
2017	British Academy Television Awards	Best International Programme	Steven Zaillian, Richard Price, and Jane Tranter	Nominated	
2017	Directors Guild of America Awards	Outstanding Directorial Achievement in Movies for Television and Miniseries	Steven Zaillian (for "The Beach")	Won	
2017	Dorian Awards	TV Performance of the Year – Actor	Riz Ahmed	Nominated	
2017	Golden Globe Awards	Best Television Limited Series or Motion Picture Made for Television		Nominated	
2017	Golden Globe Awards	Best Actor in a Limited Series or Motion Picture Made for Television	Riz Ahmed	Nominated	
2017	Golden Globe Awards	Best Actor in a Limited Series or Motion Picture Made for Television	John Turturro	Nominated	
2017	Golden Reel Awards	Best Sound Editing – Long Form Dialogue and ADR in Television	Nicholas Renbeck, Odin Benitez, Sara Stern, Luciano Vignola, and Marissa Littlefield (for "The Beach")	Won	
2017	Humanitas Prize	60 Minute Network or Syndicated Television	Richard Price and Steven Zaillian (for "The Call of the Wild")	Nominated	
2017	NAACP Image Awards	Outstanding Television Movie, Limited Series or Dramatic Special		Nominated	
2017	Online Film & Television Association Awards	Best Limited Series		Nominated	
2017	Online Film & Television Association Awards	Best Actor in a Motion Picture or Limited Series	Riz Ahmed	Won	
2017	Online Film & Television Association Awards	Best Actor in a Motion Picture or Limited Series	John Turturro	Nominated	
2017	Online Film & Television Association Awards	Best Direction of a Motion Picture or Limited Series		Nominated	
2017	Online Film & Television Association Awards	Best Writing of a Motion Picture or Limited Series		Nominated	
2017	Online Film & Television Association Awards	Best Ensemble in a Motion Picture or Limited Series		Nominated	
2017	Online Film & Television Association Awards	Best Cinematography in a Motion Picture or Limited Series		Nominated	
2017	Online Film & Television Association Awards	Best Editing in a Motion Picture or Limited Series		Nominated	
2017	Online Film & Television Association Awards	Best Music in a Motion Picture or Limited Series		Nominated	
2017	Online Film & Television Association Awards	Best Production Design in a Motion Picture or Limited Series		Nominated	
2017	Online Film & Television Association Awards	Best Sound in a Motion Picture or Limited Series		Nominated	
2017	Peabody Awards	Entertainment	HBO Entertainment in association with BBC, Bad Wolf Productions, and Film Rites	Nominated	
2017	Primetime Emmy Awards	Outstanding Limited Series	Steven Zaillian, Richard Price, Jane Tranter, Garrett Basch, and Scott Ferguson	Nominated	
2017	Primetime Emmy Awards	Outstanding Lead Actor in a Limited Series or Movie	Riz Ahmed	Won	
2017	Primetime Emmy Awards	Outstanding Lead Actor in a Limited Series or Movie	John Turturro	Nominated	
2017	Primetime Emmy Awards	Outstanding Supporting Actor in a Limited Series or Movie	Bill Camp	Nominated	
2017	Primetime Emmy Awards	Outstanding Supporting Actor in a Limited Series or Movie	Michael Kenneth Williams	Nominated	
2017	Primetime Emmy Awards	Outstanding Directing for a Limited Series, Movie, or Dramatic Special	James Marsh (for "The Art of War")	Nominated	
2017	Primetime Emmy Awards	Outstanding Directing for a Limited Series, Movie, or Dramatic Special	Steven Zaillian (for "The Beach")	Nominated	
2017	Primetime Emmy Awards	Outstanding Writing for a Limited Series, Movie, or Dramatic Special	Richard Price and Steven Zaillian (for "The Call of the Wild")	Nominated	
2017	Primetime Creative Arts Emmy Awards	Outstanding Casting for a Limited Series, Movie, or Special	Avy Kaufman and Sabrina Hyman	Nominated	
2017	Primetime Creative Arts Emmy Awards	Outstanding Cinematography for a Limited Series or Movie	Fred Elmes (for "Ordinary Death")	Won	
2017	Primetime Creative Arts Emmy Awards	Outstanding Single-Camera Picture Editing for a Limited Series or Movie	Jay Cassidy and Nick Houy (for "The Beach")	Won	
2017	Primetime Creative Arts Emmy Awards	Outstanding Sound Editing for a Limited Series, Movie, or Special	Nicholas Renbeck, Marissa Littlefield, Steve Visscher, Ruth Hernandez, Sara Stern, Luciano Vignola, Odin Benitez, Wyatt Sprague, Roland Vajs, Ruy Garcia, Warren Shaw, Heather Gross, Dan Evans Farkas, Grant Conway, and Marko Costanzo (for "Subtle Beast")	Won	
2017	Primetime Creative Arts Emmy Awards	Outstanding Sound Mixing for a Limited Series or Movie	Michael Barry, Nicholas Renbeck, Felix Andrew, and Larry Hoff (for "The Beach")	Won	
2017	Producers Guild of America Awards	David L. Wolper Award for Outstanding Producer of Long-Form Television	Steven Zaillian, Richard Price, Jane Tranter, Garrett Basch, and Scott Ferguson	Nominated	
2017	Satellite Awards	Best Miniseries or Motion Picture Made for Television		Nominated	
2017	Screen Actors Guild Awards	Outstanding Performance by a Male Actor in a Miniseries or Television Movie	Riz Ahmed	Nominated	
2017	Screen Actors Guild Awards	Outstanding Performance by a Male Actor in a Miniseries or Television Movie	John Turturro	Nominated	
2017	Society Of Camera Operators Awards	Camera Operator of the Year – Television	Ben Semanoff and Bruce MacCallum	Nominated	
2017	Television Academy Honors			Won	
2017	Television Critics Association Awards	Outstanding Achievement in Movies, Miniseries and Specials		Nominated	
2017	Writers Guild of America Awards	Long Form – Adapted	Richard Price and Steven Zaillian; Based on the TV series Criminal Justice created by Peter Moffat	Nominated	
2018	Artios Awards	Outstanding Achievement in Casting – Limited Series	Avy Kaufman, Sabrina Hyman, and Susanne Scheel	Nominated	

=== Ratings ===
In the United States, TV ratings grew over the course of its eight-episode run, with daily ratings tripling between the premiere and season finale. The premiere episode drew 2.1 million viewers, before increasing to an average gross audience of 8.2 million viewers on HBO.

In the United Kingdom, where it aired in September 2016, the first episode drew 468,000 viewers on Sky Atlantic. The show eventually drew an audience of 2.5 million viewers across Sky's On Demand platforms.

== See also ==
- List of Primetime Emmy Awards received by HBO
- Serial (podcast), a series with several similarities
