= Afton Williamson =

American actress (born 1984)

- Born: Afton C. Williamson; September 7, 1984 (age 42); Sylvania, Ohio, U.S.
- Education: Eastern Michigan University (B.F.A.); Alabama Shakespeare Festival (M.F.A.)
- Occupation: Actress
- Years active: 2010–2020

Afton C. Williamson (born September 7, 1984) is an American actress, best known for the main role of LAPD officer Talia Bishop in the ABC series The Rookie and as Assistant District Attorney Alison Cacao Medding in the Cinemax original series Banshee.

== Early life and education ==
Williamson was born in Sylvania, Ohio, and earned a Bachelor of Fine Arts degree from Eastern Michigan University and a Master of Fine Arts degree from the Alabama Shakespeare Festival.

== Career ==
Williamson started as the understudy to Kerry Washington in the 2010 Broadway play Race before succeeding Washington in the role of Susan. Later she has made her television debut appearing in an episode of The Good Wife. Williamson later guest starred on Law & Order: Special Victims Unit, Blue Bloods, and Elementary. She had recurring roles on the CBS drama A Gifted Man from 2011 to 2012 as Autumn, and the first season of the television series Nashville as Makena. From 2014 to 2015, she had a regular role in the Cinemax network original series Banshee. In film, she made her debut in the 2011 drama Pariah.

In 2016, Williamson was cast in a leading role on the VH1 drama series The Breaks. She starred as Officer Wiggins in the 2016 HBO miniseries The Night Of.

In 2018, Williamson was cast in the ABC drama series The Rookie. In 2019, Williamson quit the show citing claims of racial discrimination, sexual harassment, and assault. TVLine had reported that Williamson, who portrayed Talia Bishop, would not be returning for the second season. While the outlet initially claimed that the split was amicable, Williamson, in a lengthy Instagram post, stated that she had left the series due to having "experienced racial discrimination/racially charged inappropriate comments from the hair department head", later naming the department head as Sallie Ciganovich, now known as Sallie Nicole Hotch. Williamson also alleged that she was sexually harassed by a recurring guest star, whom she identified as actor Demetrius Grosse. Williamson claimed that she had gone to the showrunners multiple times with these allegations, but was ignored.

All involved in the allegations denied them. An investigation was commissioned through the law firm Mitchell Silberberg & Knupp along with a third-party firm, EXTTI, which conducted nearly 400 hours of interviews and examined video and other evidence. The results of the investigation were published on September 17, 2019, which found that the allegations made by Williamson had no merit, and could not be proven. Williamson stood by her claims, calling the results of the investigation "heartbreaking" and postulated that the producers had lied to cover up the truth of what happened.

== Filmography ==
=== Film ===
Year	Title	Role	Director	Notes
2011	Pariah	Mika	Dee Rees	
2012	Man on a Ledge	Janice Ackerman	Asger Leth	
2012	Abducted: The Carlina White Story	Cassandra		Television film
2018	Write When You Get Work	Valamy Vega	Stacy Cochran	
2019	Otherhood	Julia	Cindy Chupack	
2020	Still Here	Tiffany Watson	Vlad Feier	

=== Television ===
Year	Title	Role	Notes
2010	Da Brick	Rachel	Pilot
2010	The Good Wife	Yarissa Morgan	Episode: "Bad Girls"
2011	Law & Order: Special Victims Unit	Isabelle Wright	Episode: "Reparations"
2011	Homeland	Helen Walker	3 episodes (credited as Afton C. Williamson)
2011–2012	A Gifted Man	Autumn	9 episodes
2012	Blue Bloods	Officer Perez	Episode: "No Questions Asked"
2012	Royal Pains	Heather Small	Episode: "Business & Pleasure"
2012	Nashville	Makena	3 episodes
2013–2015	The Following	Haley Mercury / Kate	2 episodes
2014–2015	Banshee	Alison Medding	8 episodes
2015	Elementary	Shauna Scott	Episode: "The Best Way Out Is Always Through"
2015–2016	Blindspot	Kara Sloane	2 episodes
2016	The Night Of	Officer Wiggins	5 episode
2017	The Breaks	Nikki	
2017	The Blacklist	Lu Lu	Episode: "The Apothecary"
2018	Shades of Blue	Katie Myers	7 episodes
2018	Bull	ADA Gabrielle Ramsden	Episode: "Witness for the Prosecution"
2018–2019	The Rookie	Talia Bishop	Main role (season 1)
