= Johnny Whitworth =

American actor (born 1975)

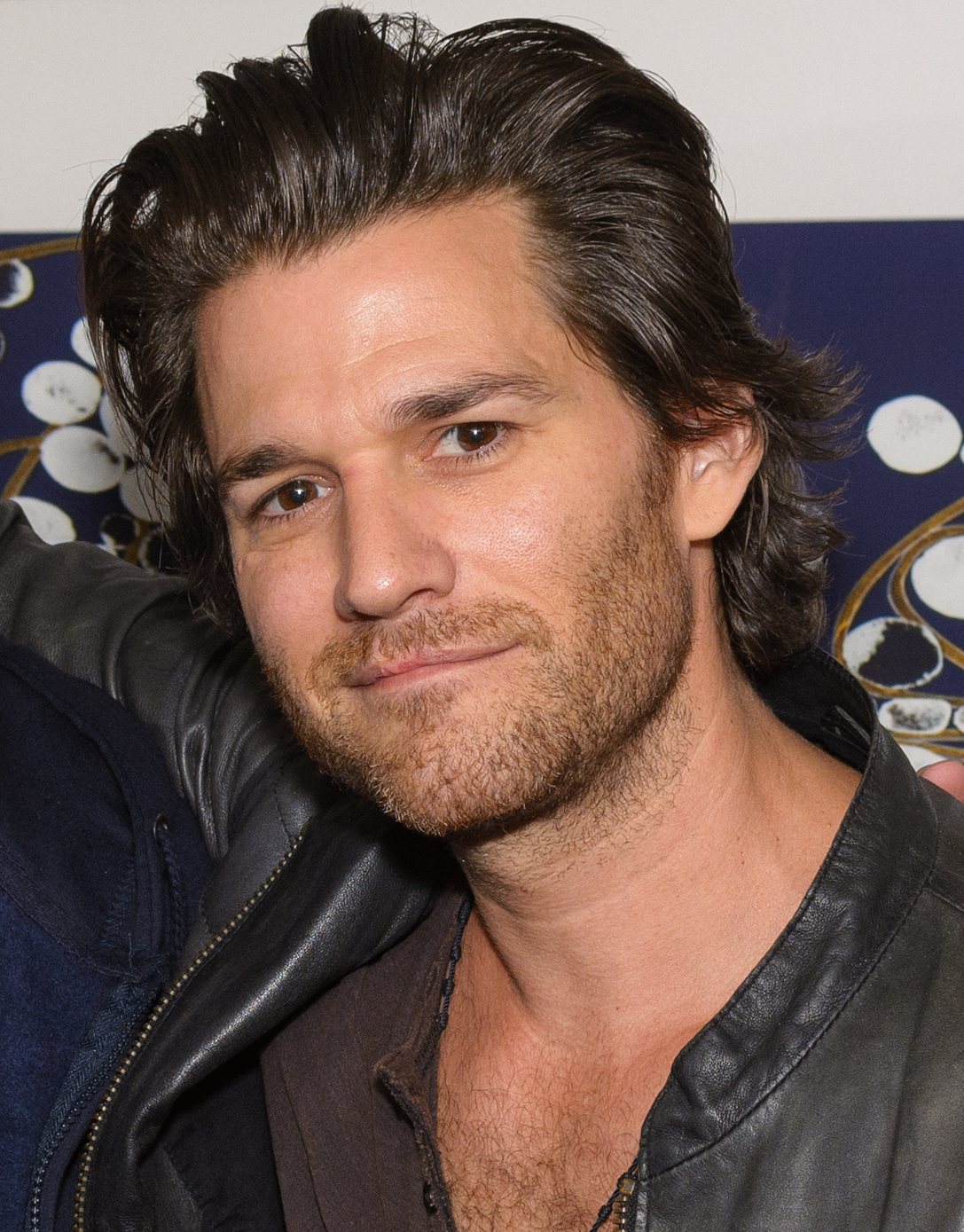
- Whitworth in October 2017
- Born: October 31, 1975 (age 50); Charleston, South Carolina, U.S.
- Occupation: Actor
- Years active: 1994–present
- Website: johnnywhitworth.com

Johnny Whitworth (born October 31, 1975) is an American actor. He is known for his roles as A.J. in Empire Records (1995), as Donny Ray Black in Francis Ford Coppola's The Rainmaker (1997), as Vernon Gant in Limitless (2011), as Blackout in the Marvel superhero film Ghost Rider: Spirit of Vengeance (2011), and as Cage Wallace in The CW's series The 100.

== Life and career ==
Whitworth's early years were spent in his birthplace, Charleston, South Carolina, with his mother. As his parents were divorced, he eventually chose to live with his father in Plano, Texas. But following that he moved to Los Angeles with his mother and at the age of 15 started his acting career with a guest appearance on Party of Five in 1994. His debut in movies was with Bye Bye Love in 1995. That same year, he played A.J. in the film Empire Records.

Whitworth made The Rainmaker in 1997, then followed that up with a part in Hell's Kitchen (1998) alongside Angelina Jolie. Whitworth had a recurring role on the CBS crime drama CSI: Miami, where he played bad-boy Detective Jake Berkeley, a love interest of Calleigh Duquesne. The story line swiftly made Whitworth's character a controversial one, as his competition for Duquesne was long-time CSI agent Eric Delko. From the end of Season 5 and throughout Season 6, Berkeley was no longer an ATF agent but a Miami-Dade homicide detective working with the CSI team. Whitworth returned in the first episode of Season 7 and again in the 21st episode of Season 8. This was his last appearance.

In 2003, he costarred in MTV's musical adaptation of Wuthering Heights, which was a modern take on the classic novel. In 2007, Whitworth appeared in the film 3:10 to Yuma; in 2009, he appeared in Gamer. He later appeared in the films Locked In and Limitless. He also played the villain Blackout in the 2011 film Ghost Rider: Spirit of Vengeance and Griffin Cavenaugh in the thriller Pathology.

From 2014 to 2015, Whitworth had the recurring role of Cage Wallace in The CW's series The 100. In 2015, Whitworth had a recurring role in NBC series Blindspot.

== Filmography ==
=== Film ===
Year	Title	Role	Notes
1995	Bye Bye Love	Max Cooper	
1995	Empire Records	A.J.	
1996	Somebody Is Waiting	Leon	
1997	The Rainmaker	Donny Ray Black	
1998	Can't Hardly Wait	Gum Boy (voice)	Uncredited
1998	Hell's Kitchen	Patty	
1999	Out in Fifty	Whitey	
1999	Me and Will	Fred	
2000	Shadow Hours	Tron	
2000	Bullslingers		
2001	Valentine	Max Raimi	
2002	The Anarchist Cookbook	Sweeney	
2002	Birdseye	Trent Doone	
2002	Kiss the Bride	Marty	
2006	Factory Girl	Silver George	
2007	3:10 to Yuma	Darden	
2008	Pathology	Griffin Cavenaugh	
2008	Reach for Me	Kevin	
2009	Gamer	Scotch	
2009	The Things We Carry	Jeremiah	
2010	Locked In	Nathan	
2011	Limitless	Vernon	
2011	Valley of the Sun	Andy Taggert / Vick Velour	
2011	Ghost Rider: Spirit of Vengeance	Ray Carrigan / Blackout	
2013	Zephyr Springs	David James	
2015	Bad Hurt	Kent Kendall	
2018	The Adventures of Thomasina Sawyer	Dr. Robinson	
2020	Still Here	Christian Baker	
2021	The Darkness of the Road	Clerk	
2024	The A-Frame	Sam	

Key
†	Denotes films that have not yet been released

=== Television ===
Year	Title	Role	Notes
1993	Phenom	Dean	Episode: "Pilot"
1994	Birdland	Dylan	Episode: "Sons and Mudders"
1994	Party of Five	P.K. Strickler	2 episodes
1997	Gun	James Munday	Episode: "The Hole"
2001	NYPD Blue	Jason Bazedon	Episode: "Dying to Testify"
2001	Providence	Jason Zeller	Episode: "Home Sweet Home"
2002	The Shield	Effi Montecito	Episode: "Cupid & Psycho"
2003	Wuthering Heights	Hendrix	Television film
2003	The Handler	Denver	Episode: "Homewrecker's Ball"
2005	Cold Case	Maurice Warfield 1978	Episode: "Blank Generation"
2005	Numbers	Dante Baker	Episode: "Obsession"
2006	Without a Trace	Miles Sussmann	Episode: "White Balance"
2006–2010	CSI: Miami	Jake Berkeley	11 episodes
2012	Outlaw Country	Ajax	Television film
2014–2015	The 100	Cage Wallace	10 episodes
2015–2020	Blindspot	Ruggedly Handsome Man / Markos	7 episodes
2017	Colony	Solomon	Episode: "Somewhere Out There"
