= My Dinner with Hervé =

2018 American television drama film

- Television release poster
- Screenplay by: Sacha Gervasi
- Story by: Sacha Gervasi; Sean Macaulay
- Directed by: Sacha Gervasi
- Starring: Peter Dinklage; Jamie Dornan; Andy García
- Music by: David Norland
- Country of origin: United States
- Original language: English

Production
- Executive producers: Peter Dinklage; Steven Zaillian; Richard Middleton; Ross Katz; Garrett Basch; Jessica de Rothschild
- Cinematography: Maryse Alberti
- Editor: Carol Littleton
- Running time: 110 minutes
- Production company: HBO Films

Original release
- Network: HBO
- Release: October 20, 2018

My Dinner with Hervé is a 2018 American television drama film written and directed by Sacha Gervasi, based on the later days of actor Hervé Villechaize, its title a riff on Louis Malle's My Dinner with Andre. The film stars Peter Dinklage as Villechaize, Jamie Dornan as a struggling journalist, and Andy García as Villechaize's Fantasy Island co-star Ricardo Montalbán. It premiered on HBO on October 20, 2018, and received generally positive reviews from critics, who praised the performances of Dinklage and Dornan.

== Plot ==
Danny Tate, a journalist and recovering alcoholic, is sent to LA for work, which includes interviewing actor Hervé Villechaize. Feeling insulted after Tate ends their interview to leave for another one with Gore Vidal, Villechaize chides Tate about his career. Tate pays for their meal and leaves, but arrives late for his interview with Vidal, who promptly leaves.

Later that night, Tate receives a call from Villechaize, who insists on continuing their interview. Tate decides to do so, mainly in order to prevent himself from returning to drinking. Villechaize arrives in a limo and the pair drive through the city, while Villechaize details his past, from his parents learning of his dwarfism, his mother's resentment of him and his father's efforts to cure it, to his early career as a painter. After he is assaulted, his parents send him to New York City, where he is inspired to become an actor after spending two months in his apartment watching television. After securing representation from the William Morris Agency (by means of barging into Martin Rothstein's office with a knife), Villechaize is cast in the James Bond film The Man with the Golden Gun, earning applause from the audience as well as his mother upon its premiere. Despite the attention from The Man with the Golden Gun, Villechaize goes four years without work. He says that he kept praying and soon enough, Rothstein secures him a role in the series Fantasy Island, which renews Villechaize's popularity. Villechaize marries Camille Hagen after she guest stars on the show.

The pair go to a strip club, where Villechaize tries to coerce Tate into breaking his sobriety and get him a lap dance. Tate succumbs to temptation and has a beer, causing him to angrily storm out, intending to return to his hotel, but Villechaize convinces him to continue on with their late night odyssey, including a stop at Pink's Hot Dogs, where Villechaize takes over driving the limo and crashes it. Shortly after they continue driving, Tate presses Villechaize on his womanizing and his marriage to Hagen. This causes Villechaize to have the vehicle stopped and he storms off. Tate catches up to him, and he begins to tell his side of the story from when people started talking about him being a problem to work with, including accusing his co-star Ricardo Montalbán of having his lines taken out of scripts and hosting sexually charged parties onset. Tate accuses him of throwing his career away.

Villechaize, while Tate reads off newspaper headlines of his exploits, tosses his file out the window before bringing them to Rothstein's house to have him confirm Montalbán was after him. Rothstein confirms this, but states Montalbán was not without reason, as Villechaize begins demanding more money and missing filming dates. He starts throwing money on reckless parties and gets into a fight with Billy Barty. His behaviour results in his firing from the show. Tate and Villechaize leave Rothstein's, and get into an argument. Tate storms off but Villechaize attacks him, holding a knife to his throat. Tate goads him to kill him, but Villechaize relents, prompting Tate to unload on Villechaize, blaming him for his own problems and that he's not the only one who's had a troubled life. Villechaize agrees to finally return Tate to his hotel, but first brings him to where they shot the pilot for Fantasy Island. Here Villechaize admits to Tate and himself he's the only one to blame for his troubles.

Hagen divorces him and has a restraining order leveled against him. Villechaize surmises he likely tried to force her to love him as opposed to it being real. While appearing as Tattoo at an event he has a breakdown and lights his costume on fire, breaking down in tears in the arms of his girlfriend Kathy Self.

Tate is returned to his hotel, and he agrees to meet with Villechaize later that night. Upon entering he finds a colleague there to replace him on the Vidal job. He calls his ex-wife Katie to apologize to her and accept that he can't fix things between them, and later that night goes to meet with Villechaize one last time before he returns to England. During this meeting, Villechaize admits that his mother was not among those praising him at The Man with the Golden Gun premiere, having walked out during the screening. Tate and Villechaize take a picture together and finally part ways on friendly terms.

As he is compiling his interview, Tate learns Villechaize had committed suicide shortly after he left. He presents his article to his editor, who orders him to cut it down. He elects to resign, and instead begins to write a book, titled My Dinner with Hervé.

== Cast ==
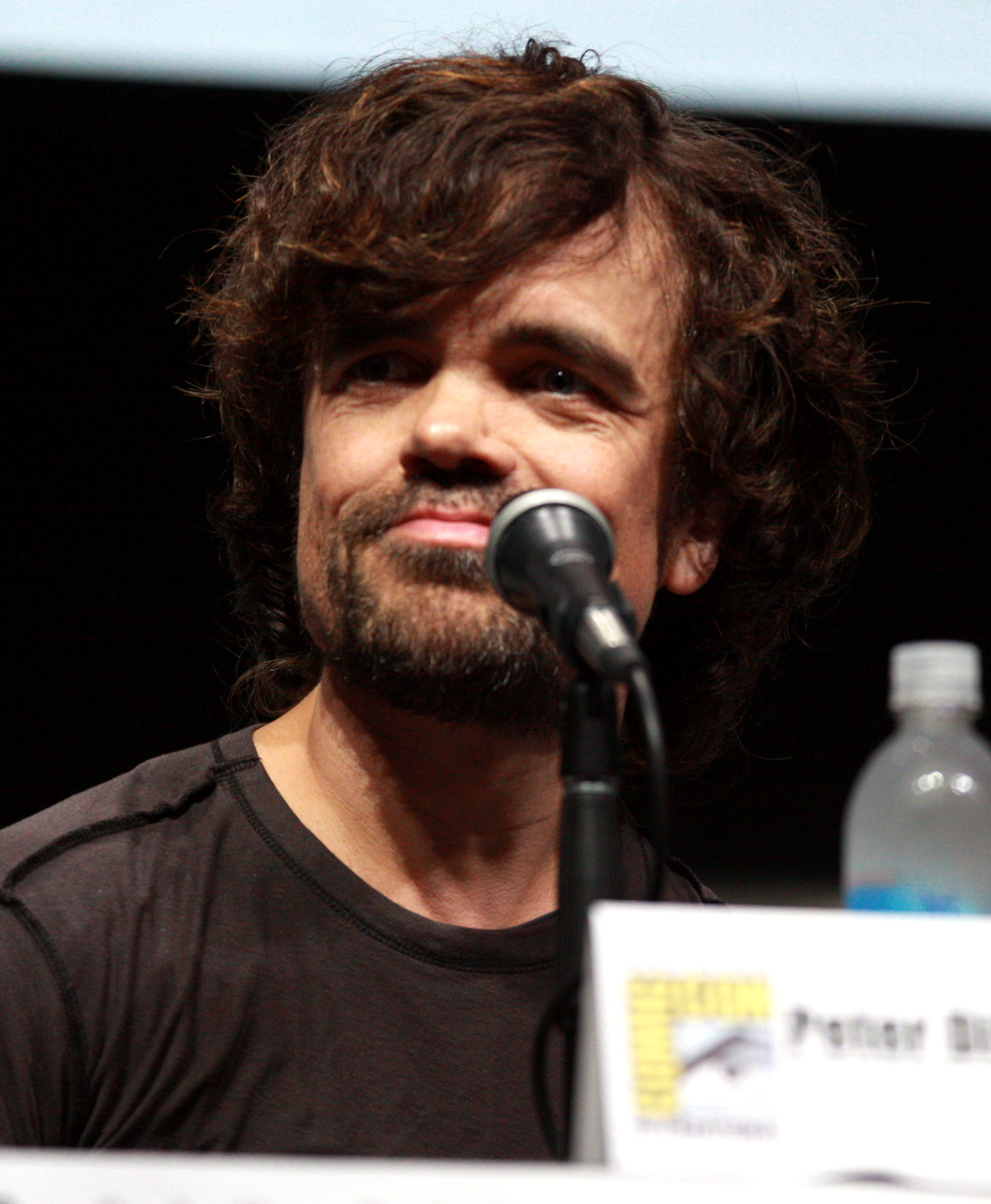
Peter Dinklage portrays Hervé Villechaize in the film.

- Peter Dinklage as Hervé Villechaize
- Jamie Dornan as Danny Tate
- Andy García as Ricardo Montalbán
- Mireille Enos as Kathy Self
- Oona Chaplin as Katie
- Harriet Walter as Baskin
- David Strathairn as Marty Rothstein
- Daniel Mays as Casey
- Alex Gaumond as André Villechaize
- Félicité Du Jeu as Evelyn Villechaize
- Wallace Langham as Aaron Spelling
- Mark Povinelli as Billy Barty
- Helena Mattsson as Britt Ekland
- Alan Ruck as Stu Chambers
- Michael Elwyn as Gore Vidal
- Ashleigh Brewer as Camille Hagen
- Robert Curtis Brown as Merv Griffin
- Mark Umbers as Roger Moore
- Sabina Franklyn as Katie's Mother

== Production ==
Peter Dinklage and writer-director Sacha Gervasi spent several years writing and producing a film based on the final days of actor Hervé Villechaize, who committed suicide shortly after his 1993 interview with Gervasi. Dinklage stars in the title role in My Dinner with Hervé. In May 2017, the film was approved by HBO, with Dinklage being set to co-star alongside Jamie Dornan. In June 2017, Andy García was cast as Villechaize's Fantasy Island co-star Ricardo Montalbán. On June 23, Mireille Enos, Oona Chaplin and Harriet Walter joined the cast. On June 27, David Strathairn joined the cast. On July 28, Mark Povinelli and Helena Mattsson joined the cast. Principal photography on the film began in June 2017.

== Reception ==
On Metacritic, the film has a weighted average score of 68 out of 100 based on 10 critics, indicating "generally favorable reviews". Rotten Tomatoes gives the film an approval rating of 83% based on 23 reviews, and the average score is 7.1/10. The site's critical consensus reads: "My Dinner with Hervé offers a standard narrative on celebrity and infamy, but formidable performances by Peter Dinklage and Jamie Dornan find the dimensionality and pathos of Hervé Villechaize the man."

== Accolades ==
Year	Award	Category	Nominee(s)	Result	Ref.
2019	Critics' Choice Television Awards	Best Movie Made for TV		Nominated	
2019	Golden Reel Awards	Outstanding Achievement in Sound Editing – Sound Effects, Foley, Music, Dialogue and ADR for Non-Theatrical Feature Film Broadcast Media	Odin Benitez, Byron Wilson, Charlie Campagna, Greg Hedgepath, Dave McMoyler, Del Spiva, Jordan McClain, Michael J. Benavente, Nicholas Fitzgerald, Lance Povlock, and Geordy Sincavage	Nominated	
2019	Online Film & Television Association Awards	Best Motion Picture		Nominated	
2019	Primetime Emmy Awards	Outstanding Television Movie	Steven Zaillian, Richard Middleton, Ross Katz, Jessica de Rothschild, Sacha Gervasi, Peter Dinklage, and Nathalie Tanner	Nominated	
2019	Producers Guild of America Awards	David L. Wolper Award for Outstanding Producer of Long-Form Television	Steven Zaillian, Richard Middleton, Ross Katz, Jessica de Rothschild, Sacha Gervasi, Peter Dinklage, and Nathalie Tanner	Nominated	
2019	Writers Guild of America Awards	Long Form – Original	Teleplay by Sacha Gervasi; Story by Sacha Gervasi and Sean Macaulay	Nominated	
2020	Guild of Music Supervisors Awards	Best Music Supervision – Television Movie	Evyen J. Klean and Janet Lopez	Nominated	
