= Philipp Keel =

Swiss artist, author, filmmaker and publisher

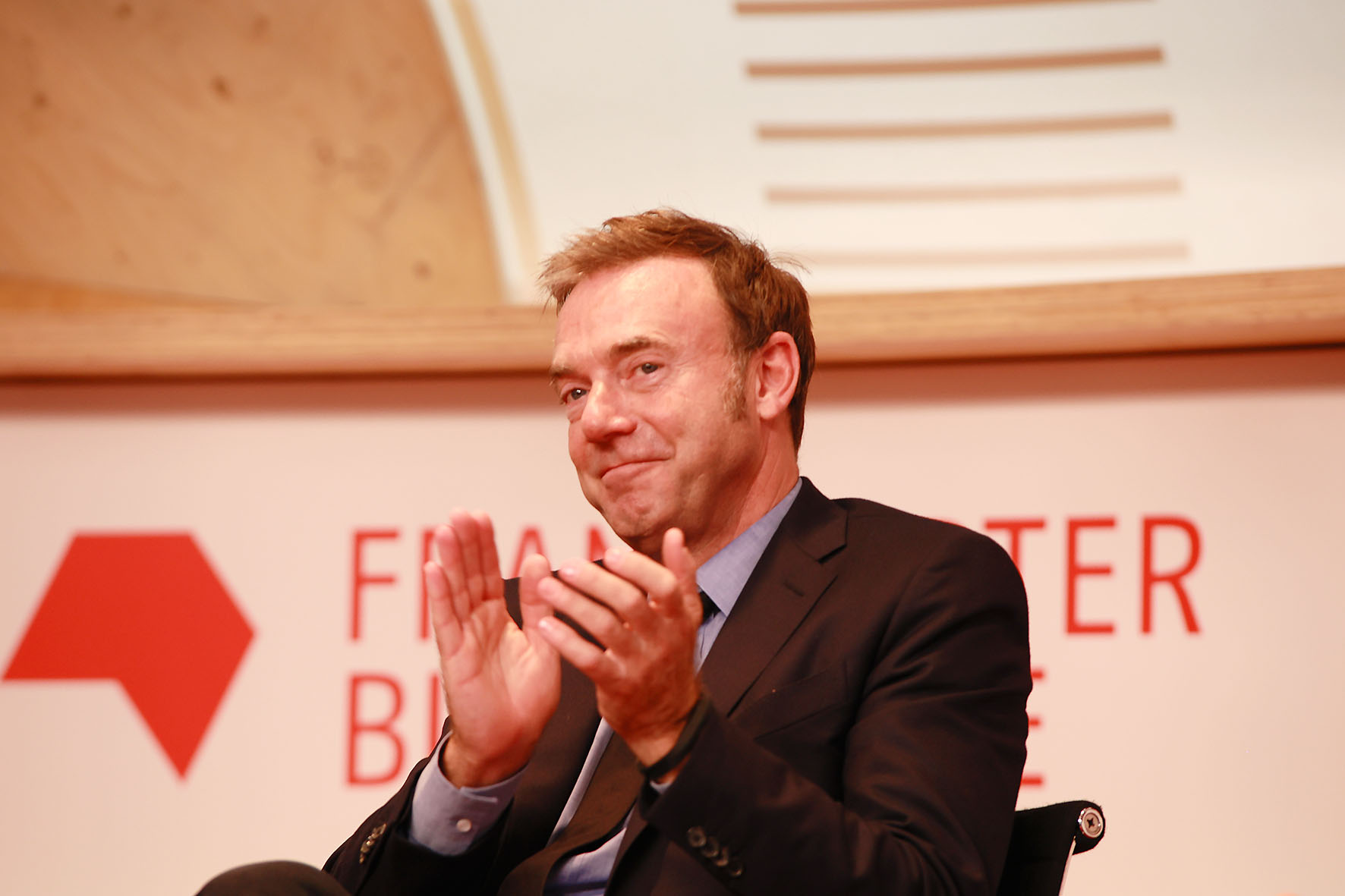
- Keel in 2022
- Born: 1968 (age 57–58); Zurich, Canton of Zurich, Switzerland
- Education: Berklee College of Music; Boston, MA United States; University of Television and Film Munich Germany
- Known for: Visual art, photography, film, author

Philipp Keel (born 1968) is a Swiss artist, author, filmmaker, and publisher.

Philipp Keel studied piano at Berklee College of Music in Boston and directing at the University of Television and Film Munich. He lived in Los Angeles and worked there as an artist, author and director. His book series All About Me and Keel's Simple Diary have reached a total circulation of around 4 million copies until today and made him famous worldwide. His photo book Color shaped a new photographic style that gives a different dimension to the everyday.

In 2012, Philipp Keel succeeded his father Daniel Keel as publisher of Diogenes and in 2016 founded Diogenes Entertainment, for which he produces international film and television projects. Since 2019, he has been the sole owner of Diogenes Verlag AG. He received the ›Premio Enrico Filippini‹ for his work as a publisher in 2022.

With the drawings and paintings from the Jakob and Philipp Keel collection, he repeatedly initiates museum exhibitions.

Philipp Keel lives in Zurich.

== Work and reception ==
"Bird Series No. 3: Two Young Birds Not Knowing Any Better" By Philipp Keel

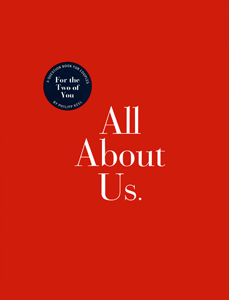
"All About Us" by Philipp Keel

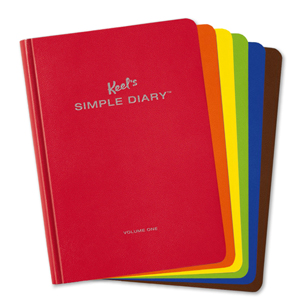
Keel's Simple Diary (Volume One was published in six colors)

Philipp Keel's artistic oeuvre includes photographs, drawings, watercolors, oil paintings and silkscreen prints. His art is shown in numerous international exhibitions and is represented in leading collections.

As a photographic artist, he is an intuitive conqueror of the moment. "Leaves floating on water cast shadows, white women's legs dive into a pool, the heat of the Sierra Nevada flickers outside a car window, a luminous Ferris wheel vibrates." All the images are united by an eye for special details and moods. Keel alters reality through alienation or reduction. He captures the magical in the everyday and seeks the world behind the world. "My photography should be honest and direct like a dream, that is my claim." "Signals and signs that mean something are there every day. I take great pleasure in linking the things I see and experience and putting them together anew, like a puzzle that makes sense only to me." While a photograph can be created quickly, Keel's image processing in the lab often takes many months. Working with Don Weinstein, one of the most renowned photo printers in the US, and with Epson, Keel developed what he calls the ›Imbue Print‹ over a period of years. His artistic work is inspired by David Hockney, Saul Steinberg, Henri Matisse, Tomi Ungerer, Irving Penn, Richard Alvedon and Saul Leiter. The art of his mother Anna Keel, who was a painter and draughtswoman, also had a strong influence on him. "I hang unfinished works on the wall and mark the places that still need work. Then I let time pass. It's never wrong to take a moment to think about what you're doing." Of his watercolour work, Keel said. "What counts here is the pace (...). Watercolours demand discipline, detachment and precision. With oil painting there is turpentine, with photography the next print, but with watercolour there is only the moment." Keel often works serially and usually deals with certain motifs and themes over several years. In doing so, the different forms of expression in his art often inspire each other. "You can't become an artist any more than you can become musical," Keel says. An old-fashioned adage guides him: practice makes perfect. He himself laments his lack of patience, calling this lack the "muse of my madness." Keel believes that there is too much of everything. "The weariness of the virtual world, which ruins everything, leads to a new longing for the classical. Making limited use of the endless possibilities is the great challenge." "What fascinates me even more than illusion, mystery, philosophy and inspiration is the passion that drives us to do exactly what we do best."

== Solo exhibitions (selection) ==
- Below the Surface, In The Pink, Loulé, 2024
- Coincidences, Grisebach, Berlin, 2023
- In Other Words, Bildhalle, Zurich, 2022
- Art Salon, Bildhalle, Zurich, 2022
- Last Summer, Bildhalle, Zurich, 2019
- Reasons and Seasons, Villa Flor, S-chanf, 2018
- Paintings, Drawings and Photographs, Apalazzogallery, Brescia, 2018
- Splash, Bildhalle, Zurich, 2017
- State of Mind, Villa Flor, S-chanf, 2014
- Splash, Camera Work, Berlin, 2013
- Tokyo Photo 5, Tokyo, 2013
- AISA – Images of an Imaginary Continent, Galerie Judin, Zurich, 2005
- Paintings, Sculptures & Photography, Charim Galerie, Vienna, 2003
- Color, Ruth Bachofner Gallery, Santa Monica, 2002
- Imbue Prints, Galerie Zur Stockeregg & Art 32 Basel, Zurich, 2001

== Group exhibitions (selection) ==
- Art Miami, The CONTEXT Art Miami Pavilion, Miami, 2024
- Frequenz, Rudolf Mangisch Galerie, Zurich, 2024
- Fernweh, Bildhalle, Zurich, 2020
- Fly Me to the Moon, Kunsthaus Zürich, Zurich, 2019
- Photography on a Postcard, Photo London, Somerset House, London, 2019
- People at Art, artgenève, Centre de la photographie Genève, Genève 2017
- Empire II, 57th Venice Biennale, Venice, 2017
- Photo Shanghai, Shanghai Exhibition Center, Shanghai, 2014
- Paris Photo, Grand Palais, Paris, 2013
- People and Places with No Name, Ace Gallery, Los Angeles, 2002
- California Dreaming, Libera Accademia di Belle Arti, Brescia, 2002
- Details, Faces & Abstracts, DJR International Art, New York, 2001
- L.A. Nude 5, Photo Impact, Los Angeles, 2000

== Publications (selection) ==
- Last Summer, Steidl 2021
- Apalazzo Gazzetta, Apalazzogallery 2018
- Splash, Steidl 2015
- State of Mind, Nieves 2014
- Keel´s Simple Diary, volume two, Taschen 2011
- Keel´s Simple Diary, volume one, Taschen 2009
- AISA – Images from an Imaginary Continent, Edition Judin 2005
- Color, Steidl 2003
- All About Us, Broadway Books 2000
- Look at Me, Edition Stemmle / Abrams Books 1999
- All About Me, Broadway Books 1998
