= Steven Zaillian =

American screenwriter, film director and producer (born 1953)

- Born: Steven Ernest Bernard Zaillian; January 30, 1953 (age 73); Fresno, California, U.S.
- Education: San Francisco State University
- Occupations: Screenwriter; film director; film producer; film editor
- Years active: 1977–present
- Spouse: Elizabeth Zaillian
- Children: 2

Steven Ernest Bernard Zaillian (born January 30, 1953) is an American screenwriter, film director and producer. He won an Academy Award, a BAFTA Award, a WGA Award, and a Golden Globe Award for his screenplay for the film Schindler's List (1993) and has earned Oscar nominations for the films Awakenings, Gangs of New York, Moneyball and The Irishman. He was presented with the Distinguished Screenwriter Award at the 2009 Austin Film Festival and the Laurel Award for Screenwriting Achievement from the Writers Guild of America in 2011. Zaillian is the founder of Film Rites, a film production company.

He also created, wrote and directed the limited series The Night Of (2016) and Ripley (2024), the latter for which he won a Primetime Emmy Award and a Peabody Award.

== Early life and education ==
Steven Zaillian was born in Fresno, California, the son of Jim Zaillian, a radio news reporter, and his wife. Zaillian is of Armenian descent. He attended Sonoma State University, and graduated from San Francisco State University in 1975 with a degree in Cinema.

== Career ==
Steven Zaillian is known for writing screenplays that often deal with tragedy and drama. Zaillian has written screenplays for many notable films. Zaillian wrote the screenplay for the 1990 film Awakenings. His most notable work is the 1993 screenplay for the film Schindler's List, for which he won an Academy Award. The Schindler’s List screenplay was voted the 49th best screenplay of all time by the Writers Guild of America West, the 32nd best of all time by IMDb, and the 49th best by filmsite.org. Zaillian directed and wrote the 1993 film Searching for Bobby Fischer, for which he earned critical and commercial acclaim. Zaillian also wrote and directed the 1998 film A Civil Action and wrote the screenplays for the films Gangs of New York in 2002, and American Gangster in 2007. In 2007, in partnership with Mandate Pictures, he signed a deal with Columbia Pictures. Zaillian co-wrote the screenplay for Moneyball in 2011 with Aaron Sorkin. Zaillian also wrote the screenplay for the 2011 film The Girl with the Dragon Tattoo. His most recent work includes creating, directing, writing, and producing the 2016 Emmy-winning HBO miniseries The Night Of and writing the screenplay for the 2019 Netflix film The Irishman.

== Personal life ==
He lives in Los Angeles with his wife, Elizabeth Zaillian. They have two sons together.

== Filmography ==
=== Film ===
Year	Title	Director	Writer	Producer
1985	The Falcon and the Snowman	No	Yes	No
1990	Awakenings	No	Yes	No
1993	Schindler's List	No	Yes	No
1993	Searching for Bobby Fischer	Yes	Yes	No
1993	Jack the Bear	No	Yes	No
1994	Clear and Present Danger	No	Yes	No
1996	Mission: Impossible	No	Story	No
1998	A Civil Action	Yes	Yes	Executive
2001	Hannibal	No	Yes	No
2002	Gangs of New York	No	Yes	No
2005	The Interpreter	No	Yes	No
2006	All the King's Men	Yes	Yes	Yes
2007	American Gangster	No	Yes	Executive
2011	Moneyball	No	Yes	No
2011	The Girl with the Dragon Tattoo	No	Yes	Executive
2014	Exodus: Gods and Kings	No	Yes	No
2018	Red Sparrow	No	No	Yes
2019	The Irishman	No	Yes	No
2021	Those Who Wish Me Dead	No	No	Yes

=== Television ===
Year	Title	Director	Writer	Executive Producer	Creator	Notes
2016	The Night Of	Yes	Yes	Yes	Yes	
2024	Ripley	Yes	Yes	Yes	Yes	

Executive producer only

- Welcome to the Rileys (2010)
- The Cold Light of Day (2012)
- The Current War (2017)
- My Dinner with Hervé (2018)

Editor

- Breaker! Breaker! (1977)
- Kingdom of the Spiders (1977)
- Starhops (1978)
- Below the Belt (1980)

== Awards and nominations ==
Organization	Year	Category	Work	Result
AACTA International Award	2011	Best Screenplay	Moneyball	Nominated
AACTA International Award	2019	Best Screenplay	The Irishman	Nominated
Academy Awards	1990	Best Adapted Screenplay	Awakenings	Nominated
Academy Awards	1993	Best Adapted Screenplay	Schindler's List	Won
Academy Awards	2002	Best Original Screenplay	Gangs of New York	Nominated
Academy Awards	2011	Best Adapted Screenplay	Moneyball	Nominated
Academy Awards	2019	Best Adapted Screenplay	The Irishman	Nominated
Astra TV Award	2024	Best Directing in a Limited Series or TV Movie	Ripley	Nominated
British Academy Film Awards	1993	Best Adapted Screenplay	Schindler's List	Won
British Academy Film Awards	2002	Best Original Screenplay	Gangs of New York	Nominated
British Academy Film Awards	2007	Best Original Screenplay	American Gangster	Nominated
British Academy Film Awards	2011	Best Adapted Screenplay	Moneyball	Nominated
British Academy Film Awards	2019	Best Adapted Screenplay	The Irishman	Nominated
Boston Society of Film Critics	2011	Best Screenplay	Moneyball	Won
Chicago Film Critics Association	1993	Best Screenplay	Schindler's List	Won
Critics' Choice Movie Awards	2011	Best Adapted Screenplay	Moneyball	Won
Critics' Choice Movie Awards	2019	Best Adapted Screenplay	The Irishman	Nominated
Directors Guild of America	2017	Outstanding Directing – Miniseries or TV Film	The Night Of (episode: "The Beach")	Won
Directors Guild of America	2024	Outstanding Directing – Miniseries or TV Film	Ripley	Won
Golden Globe Awards	1993	Best Screenplay	Schindler's List	Won
Golden Globe Awards	2011	Best Screenplay	Moneyball	Nominated
Golden Globe Awards	2019	Best Screenplay	The Irishman	Nominated
Primetime Emmy Awards	2017	Outstanding Limited Series	The Night Of	Nominated
Primetime Emmy Awards	2017	Outstanding Directing for a Limited Series or Movie	The Night Of (episode: "The Beach")	Nominated
Primetime Emmy Awards	2017	Outstanding Writing for a Limited Series or Movie	The Night Of (episode: "The Call of the Wild")	Nominated
Primetime Emmy Awards	2024	Outstanding Limited or Anthology Series	Ripley	Nominated
Primetime Emmy Awards	2024	Outstanding Directing for a Limited or Anthology Series or Movie	Ripley	Won
Primetime Emmy Awards	2024	Outstanding Writing for a Limited or Anthology Series or Movie	Ripley	Nominated
Writers Guild of America	1990	Best Adapted Screenplay	Awakenings	Nominated
Writers Guild of America	1993	Best Adapted Screenplay	Schindler's List	Won
Writers Guild of America	1998	Best Adapted Screenplay	A Civil Action	Nominated
Writers Guild of America	2002	Best Original Screenplay	Gangs of New York	Nominated
Writers Guild of America	2011	Best Adapted Screenplay	Moneyball	Nominated
Writers Guild of America	2011	Best Adapted Screenplay	The Girl with the Dragon Tattoo	Nominated
Writers Guild of America	2017	Television: Long Form – Adapted	The Night Of	Nominated
Writers Guild of America	2019	Best Adapted Screenplay	The Irishman	Nominated
Satellite Award	2011	Best Adapted Screenplay	Moneyball	Nominated
