= Augstein =

Augstein is a surname. Notable people with the surname include:

- Jakob Augstein (born 1967), German journalist and publisher, son of Rudolf
- Rudolf Augstein (1923–2002), German journalist, founder of Der Spiegel magazine
