= Eierschecke =

Layered cake from Saxony and Thuringia

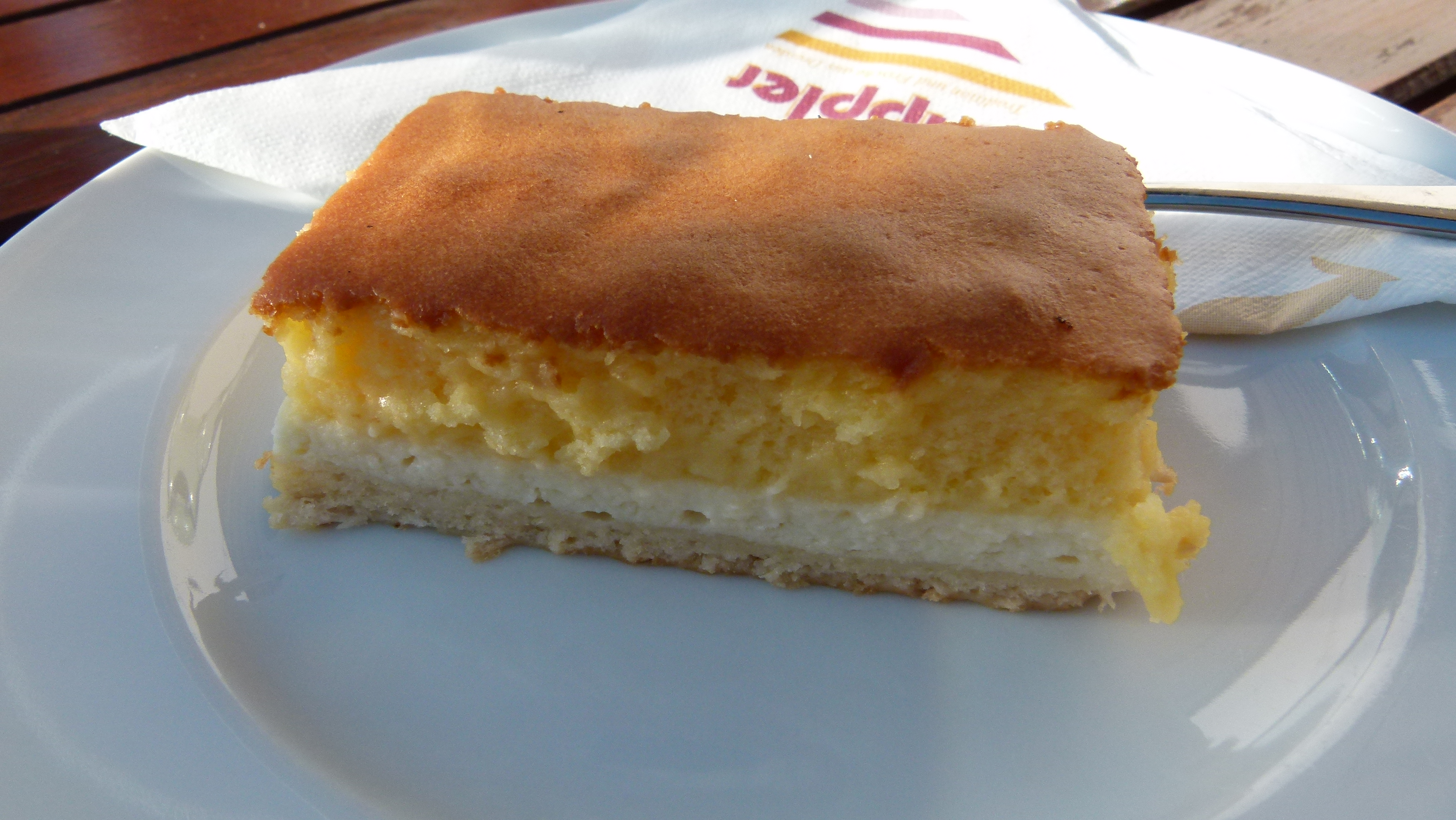
Dresdner Eierschecke

Eierschecke is a confectionery speciality from Saxony and Thuringia. It is a layer cake with a base layer of cake, a middle layer of quark-based cheesecake and a top layer of vanilla custard. Parts of it are covered with a glaze made of cream, whole egg, sugar and flour for thickening. The term originates from a piece of 14th century menswear called Schecke which consisted of a medium-length tunic with a very tight waistline and was worn with a Dusing, a hip belt. The cake was named after the appearance of this "tripartite garment" (upper part, belt, lower part).

== Preparation ==
As the name is derived from a tripartite piece of clothing, Eierschecke consists of three parts or layers: the upper layer is made of creamy stirred egg yolk with butter, sugar, vanilla pudding and, lastly, beaten egg whites, which are folded into the batter. The middle layer (the "belt") consists of a kind of custard which, in addition to butter, egg, sugar and milk, also contains quark and vanilla flavouring. The cake base is either a yeast dough or shortcrust pastry. After these three layers are assembled, the cake is baked, then cut into rectangular pieces and served with coffee. While the recipe above is for the traditional Eierschecke from Dresden, there are also some variations and refinements of this recipe, e.g. the addition of raisins, almonds or Streusel, or even the coating of the whole cake with chocolate.

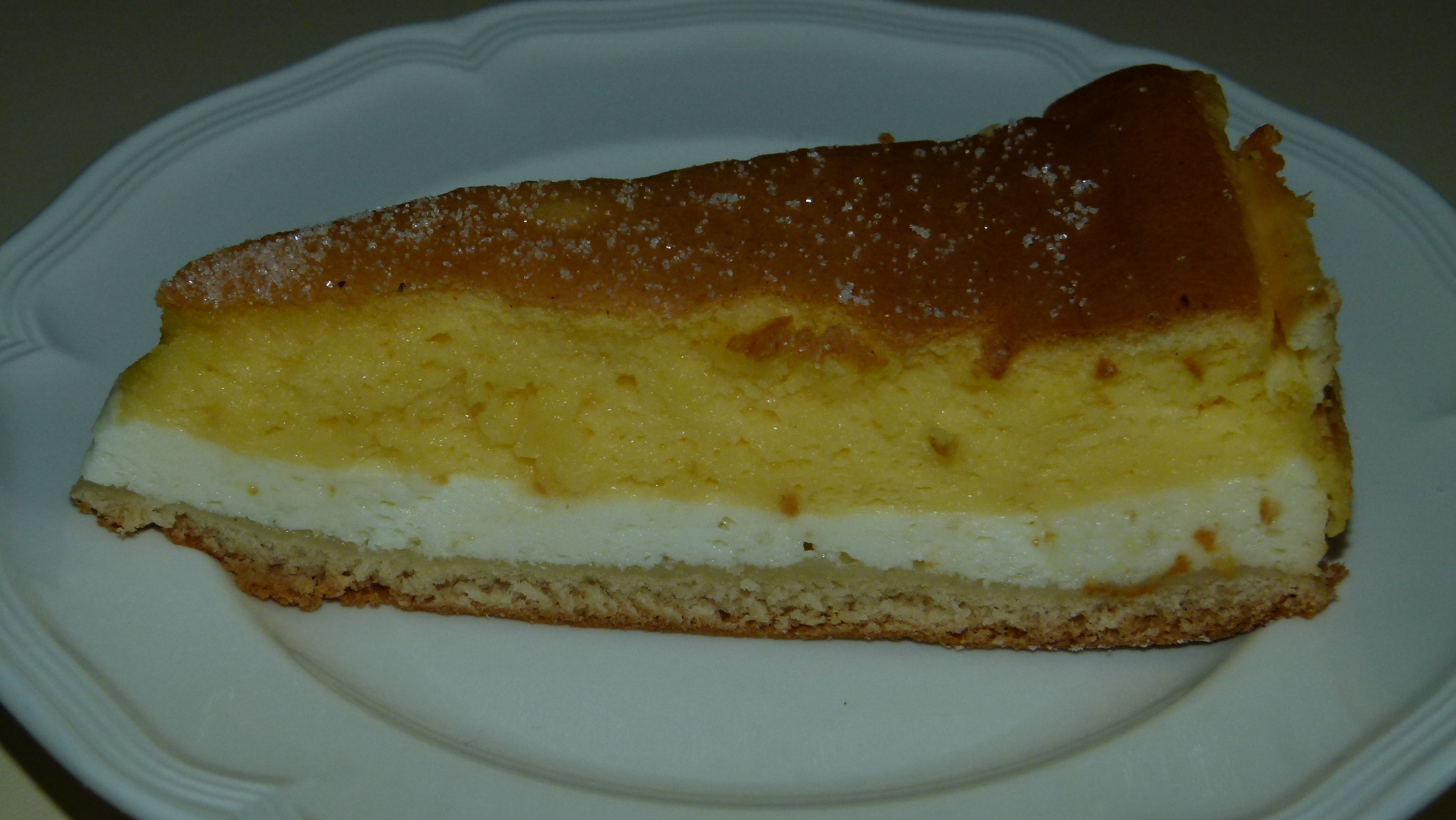
Dresdner Eierschecke

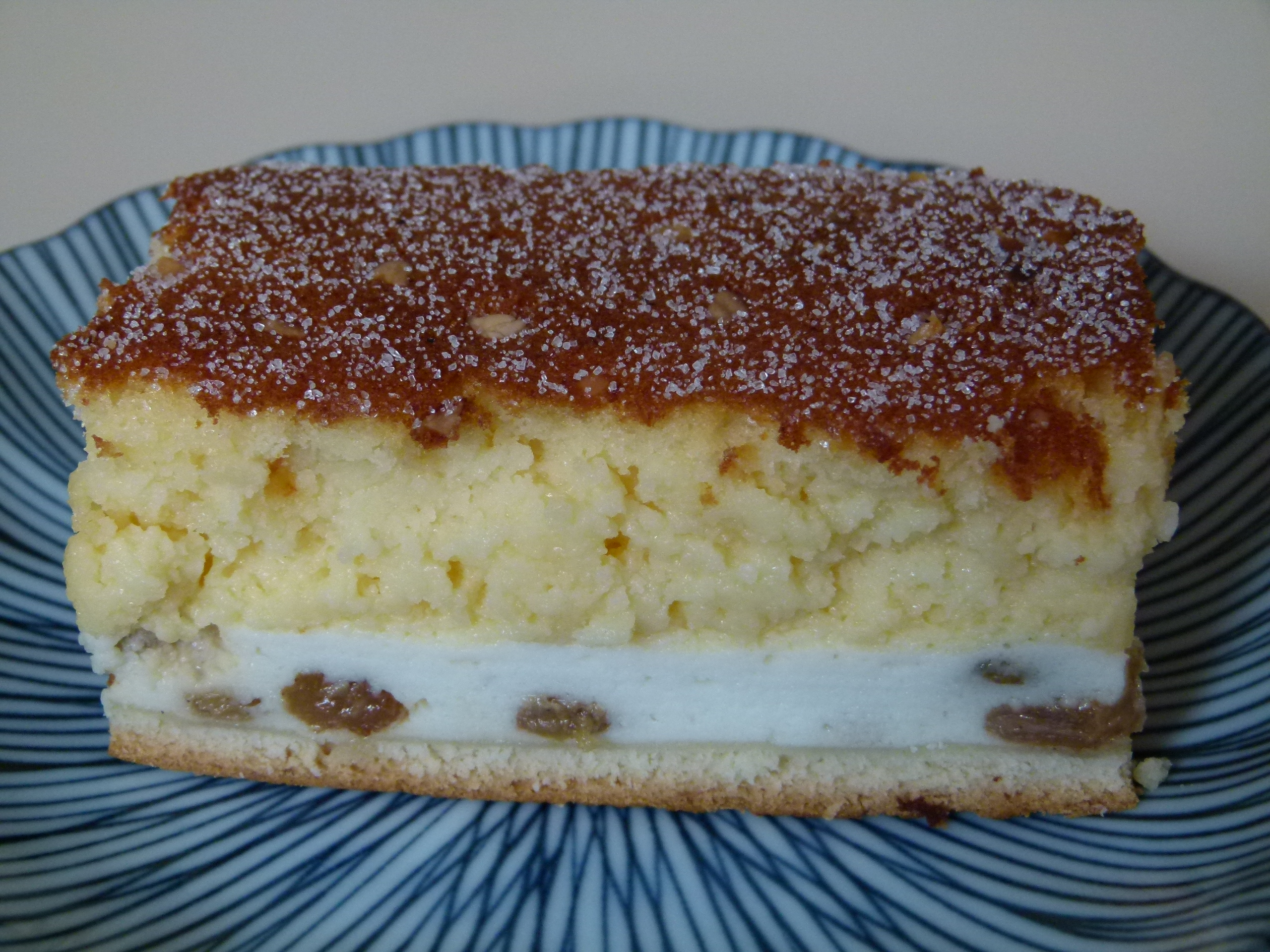
Dresdner Eierschecke with raisins

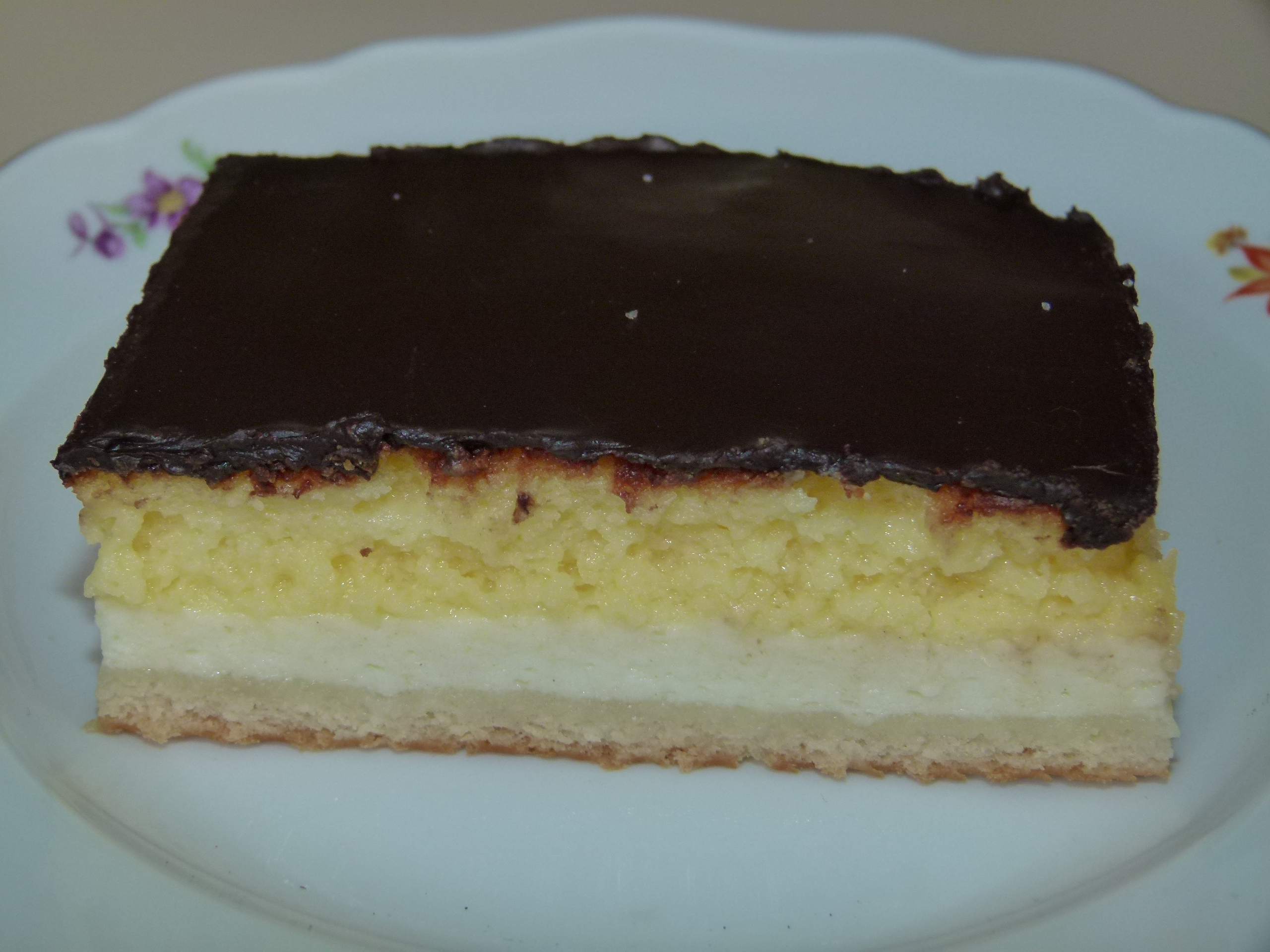
Dresdner Eierschecke with chocolate covering

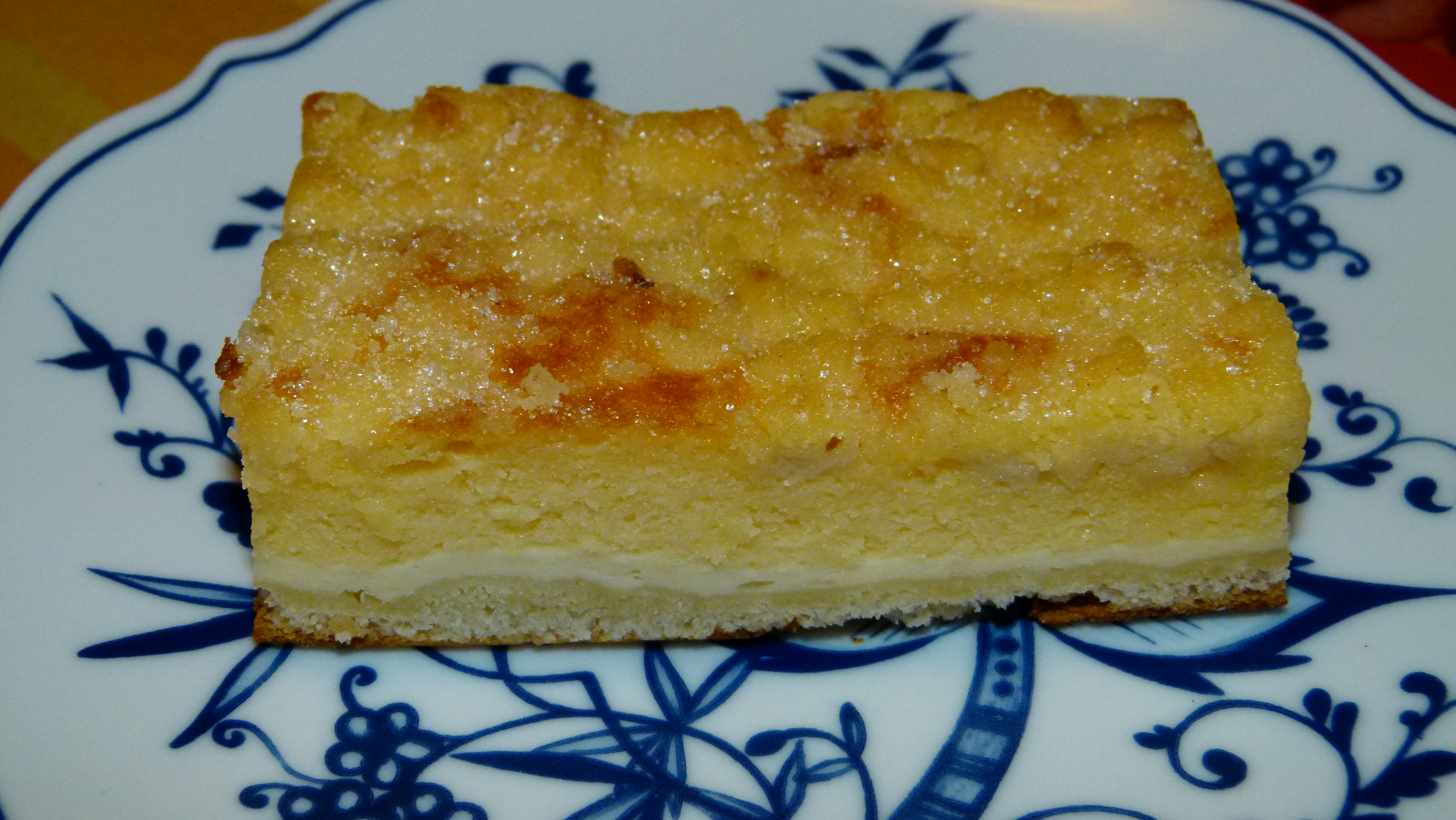
Dresdner Eierschecke with Streusel

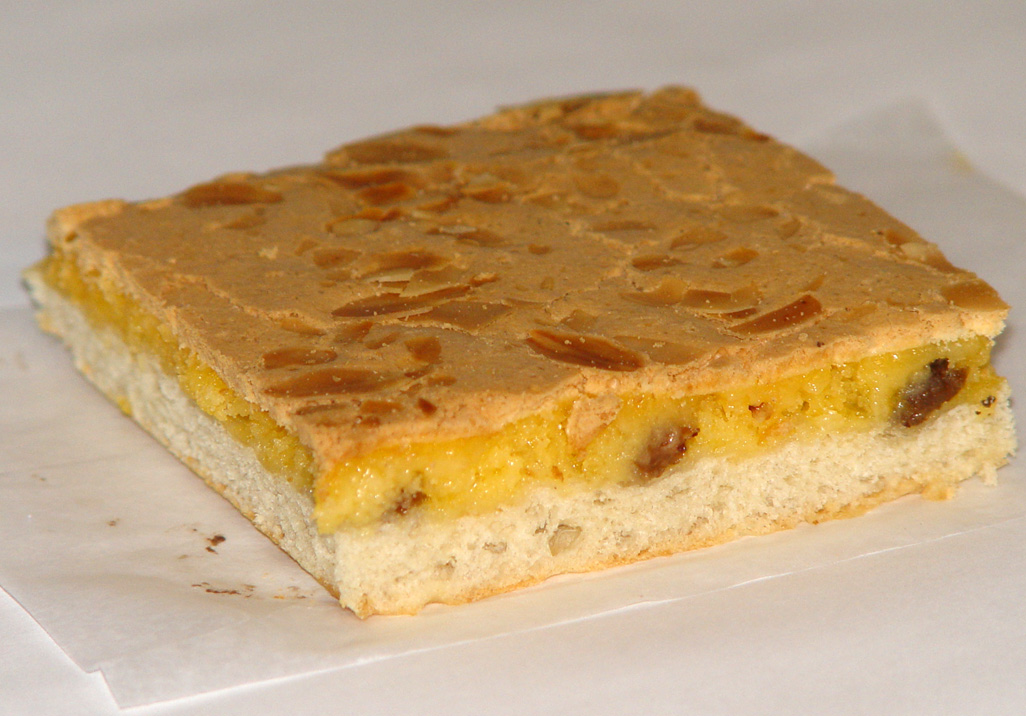
Freiberger Eierschecke

Another variation is the Freiberger Eierschecke, which is much less tall than the Dresdner Eierschecke and contains neither quark nor raisins. Legend states that the quark had been used to build the city wall of Freiberg in the 13th century. To compensate for the alleged loss of flavour, more egg, sugar and even raisins were used. The legend is deliberately nonsensical: dairy products like quark have no history of being used in mortar (unlike sticky rice mortar).

== Popular culture ==
The German author Erich Kästner once said: "Die Eierschecke ist eine Kuchensorte, die zum Schaden der Menschheit auf dem Rest des Globus unbekannt geblieben ist." (The Eierschecke is a type of cake which, to the detriment of humanity, has remained unknown to the rest of the world), and Martin Walser says in his novel Die Verteidigung der Kindheit (The defence of childhood): "Eierschecke gibt es außerhalb Sachsens nur ersatzweise und innerhalb Sachsens nirgends so gut wie im Toscana." (There are only substitutes of Eierschecke outside of Saxony; within Saxony, there is no better Eierschecke than at the Toscana (referring to the Café Toscana in Dresden))

== See also ==
- List of cakes

== Literature ==
- Jürgen Helfricht, Hartmut Quendt: Sächsisches Spezialitäten-Backbuch. Husum Verlag 2007. ISBN 978-3-89876-230-4
