= Theresia Walser =

German playwright and author

Theresia Walser (born 20 November 1967) is a German playwright, known for comedies with grotesque elements.

== Life and career ==
Theresia Walser was born in Friedrichshafen on 20 November 1967 and is the youngest daughter of the writer Martin Walser. She is a sister of the actress Franziska Walser and the writers Johanna and Alissa Walser and a half-sister of the journalist Jakob Augstein.

Walser was trained as a geriatric nurse and after that completed training as an actress, which led her into playwriting. Her plays are usually comedies and known for grotesque elements; Die Zeit has called her "the German master of the grotesque on stage". Her play Monsun im April (2008) is an absurd murder mystery in an office environment. Ich bin wie ihr, ich liebe Äpfel (2013) is about the wives of dictators. Herrinnen (2014) is about the judgemental dynamics between women careerists. In the dark comedy Die Empörten (2019), she creates a meeting between a green opportunist and a right-wing populist.
