= Petra Schmidt-Schaller =

German actress (born 1980)

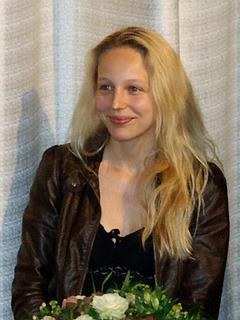
- Schmidt-Schaller in 2010
- Born: August 28, 1980 (age 45); Magdeburg, East Germany
- Occupation: Actress
- Years active: 2001–present
- Children: 1

Petra Schmidt-Schaller (born 28 August 1980) is a German actress. She is noted for the roles of Helene in Runaway Horse alongside Ulrich Noethen, Ulrich Tukur and Katja Riemann, and Maud Brewster in The Sea Wolf (2008 ProSieben film) alongside Thomas Kretschmann.

== Life and career ==
Schmidt-Schaller was born in Magdeburg, the daughter of actors Andreas Schmidt-Schaller and Christine Krüger. She grew up in Prenzlauer Berg, a borough of East Berlin. Although she comes from a family of actors, her first experience with acting was during a one-year stay 1997–1998 as an exchange student in Kansas, where she attended her High School's acting class. Before her movie and TV career, she studied acting at the Felix Mendelssohn College of Music and Theatre in Leipzig from 2001 to 2005, and acted at the Deutsches Nationaltheater Weimar from 2003 to 2005.

Having played leading roles in several German films, a minor part in Dark Castle Entertainment's Unknown (2011) was her first international assignment. After A Hero's Welcome (Nacht vor Augen, 2008) and Almanya – Welcome to Germany (Almanya – Willkommen in Deutschland, 2011), Unknown was her third work that was screened at the Berlin International Film Festival. For the TV movie Happiness Divided (Das geteilte Glück, 2010) she was awarded the German Actors' Award and was nominated for the German Television Award as best actress. In Marcus H. Rosenmüller's comedy-drama My Life in Orange she starred as Amrita, a member of the Rajneesh movement caught between the pursuit of self-realization and the love of her children.

Almost seven million television viewers tuned in to the ZDF crime drama Der Tote im Watt in April 2013, starring Petra Schmidt-Schaller as the film daughter of Thomas Thieme.[22] The broadcast ran a few weeks before the premiere of the Tatort episode Feuerteufel. There, the actress was seen for the first time as LKA investigator Katharina Lorenz alongside Wotan Wilke Möhring as NDR's Tatort commissioner Thorsten Falke. According to her own statement, she learned only one day before filming began that it was a new spin-off of Germany's most successful crime series.[23] The films with the investigators are set in changing locations in northern Germany. With the third case Kaltstart, set in Wilhelmshaven, Falke and Lorenz became the first Tatort investigators to switch to the Federal Police. After the sixth case Verbrannt, broadcast in the fall of 2015, Schmidt-Schaller ended her involvement.[24]

In 2013, she stood for the large-scale German-Austrian TV production Der Wagner-Clan. Eine Familiengeschichte as Richard Wagner's daughter Isolde with Iris Berben, Heino Ferch, Lars Eidinger and Eva Löbau. Alongside Jürgen Vogel and Moritz Bleibtreu, she starred in Maximilian Erlenwein's feature thriller Stereo, which premiered in the Panorama section of the 2014 Berlinale.[25] In 2017, she appeared alongside Jürgen Prochnow in the feature film Leander's Last Journey. This was followed by numerous film - and television films in which Petra Schmidt-Schaller starred: Eine gute Mutter (2017), Der Mordanschlag (2018), Wendezeit (2019), Marnow Murders (2021), Over & Out (2022), Ein Schritt zum Abgrund (2022) and others. For her role in Marnow Murders, she received the German Television Award for Best Leading Actress in 2021.

Schmidt-Schaller lives in Berlin. In August 2011, she gave birth to a daughter.

== Selected filmography ==
- A Mere Formality (2006)
- Runaway Horse (Ein fliehendes Pferd, 2007)
- A Hero's Welcome (Nacht vor Augen, 2008)
- The Sea Wolf (Der Seewolf, TV, 2008)
- Balkan Traffic (2008)
- Tatort – Bluthochzeit (TV, 2009)
- A Summer in Long Island (Ein Sommer in Long Island, TV, 2009)
- Happiness Divided (Das geteilte Glück, TV, 2010)
- Unknown (2011)
- Almanya – Welcome to Germany (Almanya – Willkommen in Deutschland, 2011)
- Löwenzahn – Das Kinoabenteuer (2011)
- The Good Neighbour (Unter Nachbarn, 2011)
- The Dark Nest (Das dunkle Nest, TV, 2011)
- My Life in Orange (2011)
- The Lucky Plan (Nein, Aus, Pfui! Ein Baby an der Leine, 2012)
- Der Tote im Watt (TV, 2013)
- Tatort – Feuerteufel (TV, 2013)
- The Wagner-Clan (TV, 2013)
- Stereo (2014)
- Village of Silence (TV, 2015)
- The Assassination (TV, 2018)
- Marnow Murders (Die Toten von Marnow, TV, 2021)
- The Sheikh (Der Scheich, TV, 2022)
- Over & Out (2022)

== Awards ==
- Bavarian Film Award 2007 for Best Upcoming Actress, Runaway Horse
- Deutscher Schauspielerpreis (German Actors' Award) 2012 for the most inspiring actress in a leading role, Happiness Divided
- Goldene Kamera 2018 for Best German Actress, Ich war eine glückliche Frau and Keine zweite Chance
