= Peter Vogel (actor) =

German actor (1937–1978)

- Born: 22 March 1937; Munich, Germany
- Died: 21 September 1978 (aged 41); Vienna, Austria
- Occupation: Actor
- Years active: 1954–1978

Peter Vogel (22 March 1937 – 21 September 1978) was a German film actor. He appeared in more than 60 films between 1954 and 1978. He was born in Munich, Germany and died in Vienna, Austria, after committing suicide. His father was the actor Rudolf Vogel. He was married to the Austrian actress Gertraud Jesserer and is the father of actor-journalist Nikolas Vogel. was interred next to his father at Bogenhausener Friedhof, Germany.

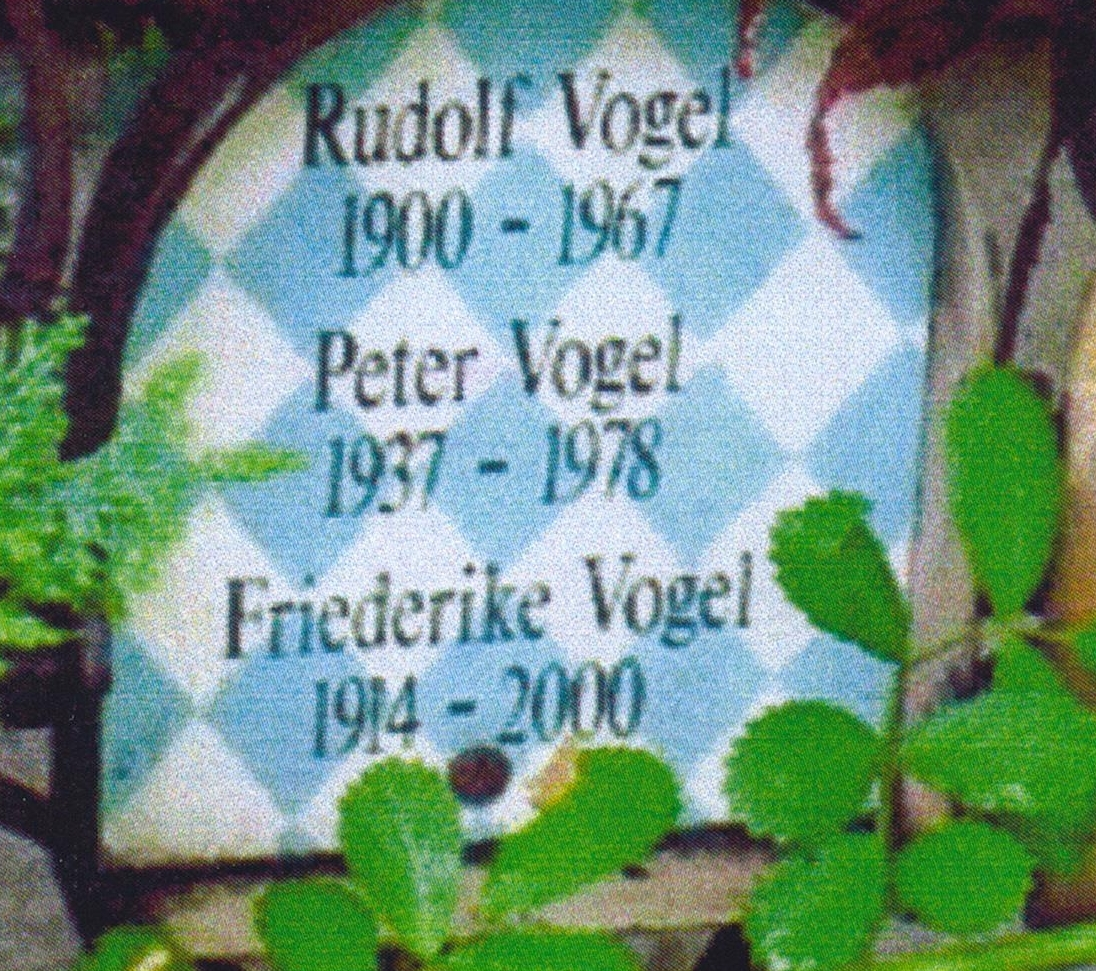
Grave Vogel Peter

== Partial filmography ==
- The First Kiss (1954) - Mathias Dammerl
- The Flying Classroom (1954) - Der schöne Theodor
- Marianne of My Youth (1955) - Jan
- Her First Date (1955) - Der lange Robby, Schüler
- Hilfe – sie liebt mich (1956) - Max, Oberkellner im "Elysée"
- Banktresor 713 (1957) - (uncredited)
- Widower with Five Daughters (1957) - Fred
- The Big Chance (1957) - Peter Fiedler
- All the Sins of the Earth (1958) - Willi Lenz
- Taiga (1958) - Winter
- False Shame (1958) - Peter Riek
- The Crammer (1958) - Eduard Neureiter
- Stefanie (1958) - Andreas Gonthar
- Wenn die Conny mit dem Peter (1958) - Harry Specht
- The Domestic Tyrant (1959) - Hannes Hartung
- Everybody Loves Peter (1959) - Tommy
- Wenn das mein großer Bruder wüßte (1959) - Walter Spatz
- The Man Who Walked Through the Wall (1959) - Hirschfeld - der Intrigant
- Heimat, deine Lieder (1959) - Uwe
- Peter Voss, Hero of the Day (1959) - Prinz José Villarossa
- That's No Way to Land a Man (1959) - Fritz Becker
- The Hero of My Dreams (1960) - Oliver Martens
- Stefanie in Rio (1960) - Andreas 'Andi' Gonthar
- Hauptmann – deine Sterne (1960) - Heini Haase
- The Young Sinner (1960) - Erich Kolp
- Agatha, Stop That Murdering! (1960) - Edgar Karter
- One Prettier Than the Other (1961) - Moritz Schröder
- Season in Salzburg (1961) - Hans Stiegler
- Freddy and the Millionaire (1961) - Kunststudent
- Dicke Luft (1962) - Francois Mirage
- Dance with Me Into the Morning (1962) - Detektiv
- Ohne Krimi geht die Mimi nie ins Bett (1962) - Michael Lutz
- Kohlhiesel's Daughters (1962) - Rolf
- Das haben die Mädchen gern (1962) - Peter Werner
- Don't Fool with Me (1963) - Gag-Man Hans Rabe
- A Holiday Like Never Before (1963) – Mike Roberts
- The Black Cobra (1963) - Krim.Ass. Dr. Alois Dralle
- Wochentags immer (1963)
- Charley's Aunt (1963) - Charley Sallmann
- Ferien vom Ich (1963) - Jürgen
- Die ganze Welt ist himmelblau (1964) - Frank
- The Phantom of Soho (1964) - Sergeant Hallam
- Monsieur (1964) - Michel Corbeil
- I Learned It from Father (1964) - Oskar Werner Vischer
- Condemned to Sin (1964) - Hans
- The Seventh Victim (1964) - Butler Irving
- Killer's Carnival (1966) - Wendt, Suspected girls' killer
- Valentin Katajews chirurgische Eingriffe in das Seelenleben des Dr. Igor Igorowitsch (1967, TV film) - Dr. Igor Igorowitsch
- Hier bin ich, mein Vater (1970, TV film) - Otto Maier
- The Eddie Chapman Story (1971, TV film) - Eddie Chapman
- Die seltsamen Abenteuer des geheimen Kanzleisekretärs Tusmann (1972, TV film) - Baron Benjamin Dümmerl
- Temptation in the Summer Wind (1972) - Freund des Professors
- Mein Onkel Benjamin (1973, TV film) - Dr. Benjamin Rathery
- Kottan ermittelt (1976–1978, TV Series) - Major Adolf Kottan / Oberstleutnant Horeis
- The Unicorn (1978) - Anselm Kristlein
