= Runaway Horse (film) =

German comedy film based on the novella by Martin Walser

- Directed by: Rainer Kaufmann
- Based on: Runaway Horse by Martin Walser
- Starring: Katja Riemann; Ulrich Noethen; Ulrich Tukur
- Release date: 30 June 2007 (Filmfest München)
- Running time: 92 minutes
- Country: Germany
- Language: German

Runaway Horse (German: Ein fliehendes Pferd) is a 2007 German comedy film based on the homonymous novella by Martin Walser.

== Cast ==
- Ulrich Noethen - Helmut Halm
- Ulrich Tukur - Klaus Buch
- Katja Riemann - Sabine Halm
- Petra Schmidt-Schaller - Helene
