= Wasserburg am Bodensee =

- Municipality
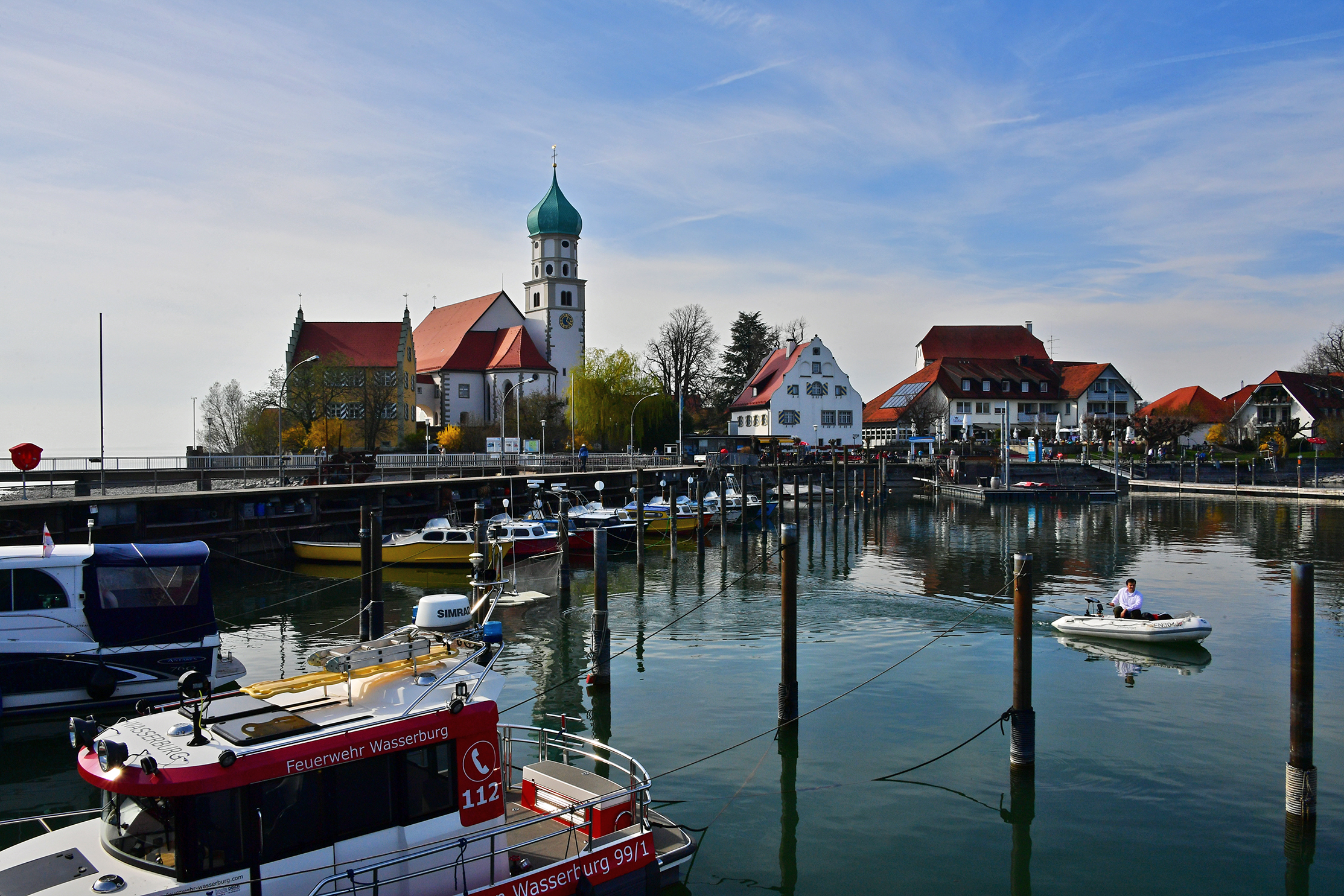
- Harbour with the Church of Saint George

- Coat of arms

- Location of Wasserburg am Bodensee within Lindau district
- Interactive map of Wasserburg am Bodensee
- Location within Germany Location within Bavaria
- Coordinates: 47°34′01″N 9°37′34″E
- Country: Germany
- State: Bavaria
- Admin. region: Schwaben
- District: Lindau

Government
  - Mayor (2020–26): Harald Voigt

Area
  - Total: 6.34 km^{2} (2.45 sq mi)
- Elevation: 399–450 m (1,309–1,476 ft)

Population (2025-12-31)
  - Total: 3,890
  - Density: 614/km^{2} (1,590/sq mi)
- Time zone: UTC+01:00 (CET)
  - Summer (DST): UTC+02:00 (CEST)
- Postal codes: 88142
- Dialling codes: 0 83 82
- Vehicle registration: LI
- Website: www.wasserburg-bodensee.de

Wasserburg am Bodensee is one of the three Bavarian municipalities on the shores of Lake Constance. It is a known resort, sought out for the supposedly healthy nature of its atmosphere.

== Geography ==
=== Parts of the municipality ===
The community is made up of several distinct districts:

- Wasserburg
  - Wasserburg (Church and Castle)
  - Mooslachen
  - Mitten
  - Reutenen
  - Hengnau
  - Hattnau
  - Hege

== History ==
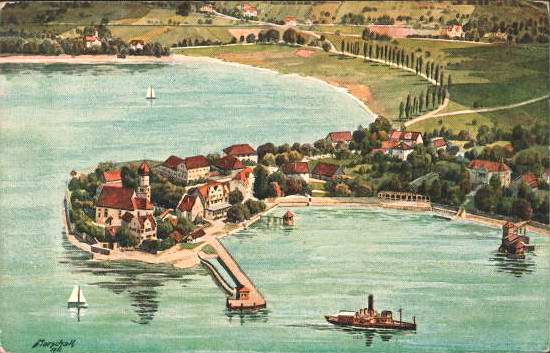
Wasserburg am Bodensee 1900

Wasserburg (literally: a castle in the water) was founded in 784, at which time it lay on an island. It was part of the lands of the monastery of St Gallen. In 1384 it came within the power of the Counts of Montfort, who sold it in 1592 to the Fuggers. In 1720 the island became a peninsula when it was linked to the mainland by a causeway, some of whose sandstone columns still remain.

In 1755, the Fuggers gave up sovereignty over Wasserburg to the Habsburgs in settlement of some debts, so the town then formed part of Austria, under the governance of Tettnang. In 1806 Napoleon Bonaparte transferred its sovereignty to the kingdom of Bavaria.

A steamship pier was built in 1872, the first railway station in 1899, and electric lighting was introduced in 1911/12.

== Notable sights ==
Wasserburg is famous for its picturesque peninsula, on which stand the Church of St George (14th century), Wasserburg Castle, and the Malhaus (Law courts, now a museum). Also on the peninsula are the quay, from which passenger ferries leave for Lindau, Bregenz, Konstanz and Rorschach, the fishing harbour and the marina. From the castle there is an outstanding view towards the mountains of Switzerland, Liechtenstein and Austria.

The Antoniuskapelle in the Selmnau district was first consecrated in 1492. Among its ornaments are a gothic Madonna and several baroque sculptures. The chapel stands on a glacial moraine and gives a broad view over Lake Constance.

== Literature ==
Martin Walser's novel of a boy growing up during the time of Hitler's rise and defeat, A Gushing Fountain, is set in Wasserburg am Bodensee.

== Economy ==
Nowadays Wasserburg's economy is based mainly on tourism and the cultivation of fruit. The municipality possesses two beach swimming pools, a boat hire facility, and a sailing school. Numerous hotels, boarding houses and bed and breakfast establishments offer a total of over 1,700 tourist beds. The local fishing industry supplies the town's restaurants with fresh fish from Lake Constance, especially whitefish.
