= Philippsburg (disambiguation) =

Philippsburg is a town in Baden-Württemberg, Germany.

Philippsburg may also refer to:

== Places ==
- Philippsbourg, French municipality in the Department of Moselle (German name: Philippsburg)
- a fictitious city in Martin Walser's novel Marriage in Philippsburg

== Buildings ==
- Philippsburg Fortress in Philippsburg, Germany
- Philippsburg Nuclear Power Station near Philippsburg
- Philippsburg (Leer), a manor house in East Frisia, Germany
- Löwenburg and Philippsburg, ruined castles in Monreal, Germany
- Schloss Philippsburg is the name of:
- Schloss Philippsburg (Braubach) in Braubach, Rhineland-Palatinate, Germany
- Schloss Philippsburg (Koblenz), former schloss in Koblenz-Ehrenbreitstein, Rhineland-Palatinate, Germany
- Schloss Philippsburg (Niederwürzbach), former schloss in Blieskastel-Niederwürzbach, Saarland, Germany
- Schloss Philippsburg (Philippsbourg), former schloss in Philippsbourg, Moselle, France

== See also ==
- Philipsburg (disambiguation)
- Phillipsburg (disambiguation)
