= Philipsburg =

Philipsburg may refer to:

- Philipsburg, Montana, United States
- Philipsburg, Pennsylvania (disambiguation), several places in Pennsylvania, United States
- Philipsburg, Quebec, a lakeside village in Quebec on the Canada-United States border
- Philipsburg, Sint Maarten, the capital of Sint Maarten
- Philipsburg Manor, a large Colonial era estate in Westchester County, New York
- Philipsburg, New York, also "Philipsburgh", original name for Sleepy Hollow, New York

== See also ==
- Philippsburg (disambiguation)
- Phillipsburg (disambiguation)
