= Jakob Augstein =

German heir, journalist and publisher (born 1967)

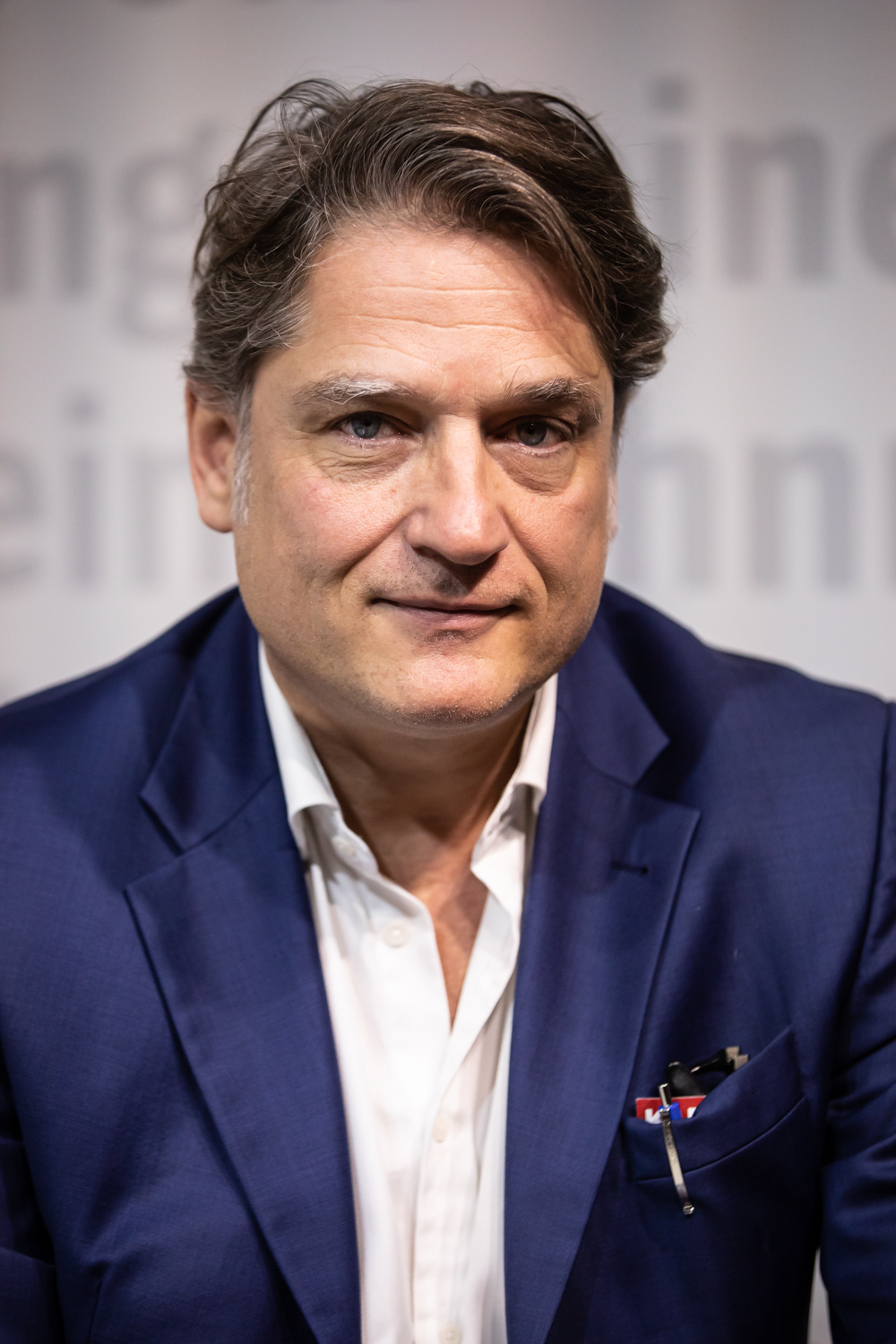
- Augstein in 2019
- Born: 28 July 1967 (age 59); Hamburg, West Germany
- Occupation: Journalist

Jakob Augstein (born 28 July 1967) is a German journalist, publisher and heir. He is the publisher and editor-in-chief of Der Freitag and also one of the main owners of Der Spiegel and the Spiegel publishing company, that were founded by his father Rudolf Augstein.

== Life and career ==
Augstein was born in Hamburg. He grew up as the son of Maria Carlsson, translator, and Rudolf Augstein, publisher of Germany's leading news magazine Der Spiegel. After Rudolf's death in 2002, Jakob was told by his mother that his biological father was the novelist Martin Walser; Jakob publicised his mother's alleged confession in 2009. His half-sisters or sisters are journalist Franziska Augstein, actress Franziska Walser, dramatist Theresia Walser and writers Johanna Walser and Alissa Walser.

After graduating high school (Abitur) at Christianeum Hamburg, Augstein studied political science at the Otto-Suhr-Institut at the Free University of Berlin and at the Institut d'études politiques de Paris (Sciences Po). From 1993 to 2003 he worked for Süddeutsche Zeitung in Munich and Berlin, from 1999 to 2002 being the chief editor of the "Berlin" section of SZ. In 2004, he bought the majority of Rogner & Bernhard, a Berlin publishing house (he sold it to Haffmans & Tolkemitt in 2011). Augstein holds 24 percent of the Augstein family's part of the Spiegel-Verlag publishing house, that his father founded in 1947.

After 2005, he also worked for the parliamentary office of Die Zeit, a weekly German newspaper.

On 26 May 2008 Augstein bought, and became editor of, the minor weekly newspaper Der Freitag.

Between January 2011 and October 2018, he also wrote a weekly column for Spiegel Online ("S.P.O.N. – Im Zweifel links" ("if in doubt, take a leftist position").

Also since early 2011, he is the counterpart of Nikolaus Blome, a journalist for Bild newspaper, in a weekly debate on controversial issues of German politics, on German public television channel Phoenix ("Augstein und Blome").

Augstein is married and has three children.

== Accusations of antisemitism from the Simon Wiesenthal Center ==
In the 2012 edition of the Simon Wiesenthal Center's (SWC) list of Top Ten Anti-Semitic/Anti-Israel Slurs, Augstein was ranked ninth, for statements critical of Israel such as "Israel's nuclear power is a danger to the already fragile peace of the world", "the ultra-orthodox Hareidim...are cut from the same cloth as their Islamic fundamentalist opponents", "[violence in the middle east always benefits] the insane and unscrupulous. And this time it's the U.S. Republicans and Israeli government", and "Israel incubates its own opponents [on the Gaza strip]". His inclusion in the ranking sparked a vast controversy in German media.

Henryk M. Broder, a public commentator, was cited in the publication: "Jakob Augstein is not a salon anti-Semite, he's a pure anti-Semite … an offender by conviction who only missed the opportunity to make his career with the Gestapo because he was born after the war. He certainly would have had what it takes." After this publication, Broder apologized for his "dramatizations." Apart from that, he upheld his criticism of Augstein. Other journalists felt that the accusation against Augstein was absurd.

In response to the ranking, the influential conservative daily Frankfurter Allgemeine Zeitung wrote that "the choice of Jakob Augstein for ninth place on the list of the 10 worst anti-Semites is a serious intellectual and strategic error made by the Simon Wiesenthal Center. Not only has a critical journalist been placed in a group into which he doesn't belong, the nine other people and groups who have justifiably been pilloried can now exculpate themselves by pointing to such arbitrariness."

Salomon Korn, vice president of the Central Council of Jews in Germany, defended Augstein saying that he didn't believe that his writings were antisemitic and suggested that the Americans (referring to the SWC) hadn't done their homework.

Der Spiegel tried to organize a debate between Augstein and the SWC. Augstein immediately agreed to the debate but Rabbi Abraham Cooper, who is one of the founders of the SWC and responsible for compiling the list, said he needed time to consider the offer. Cooper responded to the magazine, writing that "Mr. Augstein must publicly apologize in advance for the statements that earned him his designation on the Wiesenthal Center's Top Ten anti-Semitism List" otherwise he would refuse to "sit in the same room with him." Augstein refused the offer. The magazine then proposed that the debate would be held over Skype so that the two men wouldn't have to be seated in the same room, but Cooper again reiterated that he would not participate unless Augstein first apologized.

== Writings ==
- Augstein, Jakob (1998). Sieben Schüsse in Glienicke (in German). ISBN 978-3-446-19303-1.
- —— (2012). Die Tage des Gärtners (in German). ISBN 978-3-446-23875-6.
- —— (2013). Sabotage (in German). ISBN 978-3-446-24348-4.
