= Over & Out (film) =

2022 German comedy drama film

- Theatrical release poster
- Directed by: Julia Becker
- Written by: Julia Becker
- Produced by: Frauke Kolbmüller
- Starring: Jessica Schwarz; Nora Tschirner; Julia Becker; Petra Schmidt-Schaller
- Cinematography: Florian Mag
- Edited by: Matti Falkenberg
- Music by: Josef Bach; Arne Schumann
- Production companies: Oma Inge Film; Warner Bros. Film Productions Germany; SamFilm; Magic Media Production
- Distributed by: Warner Bros. Pictures
- Release date: 31 August 2022
- Country: Germany
- Language: German

Over & Out is a 2022 German comedy drama film directed and starring Julia Becker. It was filmed in Croatia.

== Plot ==
Lea, Toni, Steffi, and Maja have been friends since their teenage years, but have gradually drifted apart since their school days. Now in their late thirties, the four women are pursuing very different paths in life: While management consultant Lea lives only for her job, hoping in vain for a CEO position, Steffi has become a mother of two and leads an unhappy life as a housewife, from which she tries to escape with occasional affairs. Toni, meanwhile, has made a career as a rock musician and leads a high-profile life in the spotlight, but struggles with her feelings for her manager, Matti. The free-spirited Maja has opted for a bohemian life abroad.

Twenty-six years after a vow in which the four women promised to attend each other's weddings, Maja spontaneously invites her friends to her wedding in Italy via video message. Just two days later, Lea, Toni, and Steffi set off from Hamburg and Bremen to Umbria, where they boarded a station wagon rented by Maja and headed for the church. Upon arrival, however, the three friends were met not with a wedding, but with a nasty surprise: Maja had invited them not to her wedding, but to her funeral – she had died a few hours earlier from pancreatic cancer and had lured the group to Italy with the help of her supposed fiancé, Ahmed.

In another video message, Maja asked her friends for one last wish: Contrary to her mother Doris's wishes, she wanted to be laid to rest not in Hamburg-Niendorf, but at her beloved spot on the Italian coast. Lea, Toni, and Steffi took heart and decided to grant Maja's request. That night, they loaded her body into the station wagon and embarked on the 18-hour journey to Gioia Lamenzo. During the drive, conflicting emotions and old patterns of behavior resurfaced. The friends have to admit to themselves that they're not nearly as close as they used to be, and that in the preceding months, other priorities hadn't given Maja a chance to talk about her illness.

When they arrive in Gioia Lamenzo that night, Lea, Toni, and Steffi accidentally pickpocket some cocaine. After spontaneously using it, they initially celebrate exuberantly with the other guests at a local party, before the mood abruptly shifts: When Toni's T-shirt slips, revealing a stoma bag, she reluctantly tells her friends that she has an autoimmune disease. In turn, she confronts Lea, revealing that Steffi knows about her long-term affair with Steffi's husband, Karl, and that Steffi only tolerates the contact because she already sees her marriage as doomed and also has affairs herself. Lea, Toni, and Steffi part ways after a falling out. Toni then decides to go public with her illness via social media and to tell Matti. Lea simultaneously quits her job.

Back at the car, the three friends finally talk things out. Together, they carry Maja's body down to the sea, where, at sunset, they place it on two bodyboards, push it into the water, and set it alight with sparklers. Sipping a cup of Batida de Coco-Kirsch, they watch as Maja drifts out to sea. The next morning, they head home, where (as shown in the end credits) Steffi decides to break up with Karl and move out. Toni, who has managed to bring herself to get closer to Matti despite her disabilities, begins a relationship with him. Lea, who subsequently takes some time off, becomes pregnant the following year. The identity of the father of her child remains unknown.

== Cast ==
- Jessica Schwarz as Lea
- Petra Schmidt-Schaller as Toni
- Julia Becker as Steffi
- Nora Tschirner as Maja
- Denis Moschitto as Ahmed
- Sascha Alexander Geršak as Dennis
- Sabine Vitua as Doris Radebeil
- Elvis Clausen as Matti
- Lo Rivera as Fernanda
- Axel Stein as Karl
