= Stereo (2014 film) =

2014 film

- Film poster
- Directed by: Maximilian Erlenwein
- Written by: Maximilian Erlenwein
- Produced by: Alexander Bickenbach, Manuel Bickenbach, Khaled Kaissar
- Starring: Jürgen Vogel
- Cinematography: The Chau Ngo
- Edited by: Sven Budelmann
- Music by: Enis Rotthoff
- Distributed by: Wild Bunch Munich
- Release dates: 8 February 2014 (Berlin); 15 May 2014 (Germany)
- Running time: 95 minutes
- Country: Germany
- Language: German

Stereo is a 2014 German thriller film directed by Maximilian Erlenwein. The film premiered in the Panorama section of the 64th Berlin International Film Festival. On 5 July 2014 the film was presented at the Vologda Independent Cinema Voices Festival. The North American Premiere was celebrated at the Fantasia International Film Festival in Montreal on 31 July 2014. Stereo opened the South Korean Puchon International Fantastic Film Festival 2014. It was also shown in the "Sang Neuf" (Young Blood) Section at the Beaune Film Festival 2014 and in the International Competition Programme of the Odesa International Film Festival.

Stereo was one of fifteen potential films to be considered as Germany's candidate to the Academy Awards 2015 as the Best Foreign Language Film, but it was not selected.

== Cast ==
- Jürgen Vogel as Erik
- Moritz Bleibtreu as Henry
- Petra Schmidt-Schaller as Julia
- Georg Friedrich as Keitel
- Rainer Bock as Wolfgang
- Mark Zak as Gaspar
- Helene Schönfelder as Helena
- Fabian Hinrichs as physician
- Jürgen Holtz as spiritmend
