= Maria Carlsson =

German literary translator

Maria Carlsson-Augstein (born 1937) is a German former literary translator. She is fluent in English and has translated numerous English literary works into German.

== Biography ==
Maria Carlsson was born in 1937. She was married to German journalist Hans-Joachim Sperr. After Sperr's death, she married Rudolf Augstein in 1968. They had two children, Franziska Augstein and Jakob Augstein. They divorced in 1970. Following her ex-husband's death in 2002, she informed her son that his biological father was in fact novelist Martin Walser.

== Literature career ==
Carlsson has been working as a translator of literary works which are derived from the English language since the 1950s, and has translated numerous John Updike popular literary works such as Memories of the time under Ford, The Party in the evening, I never was happy, Golf dreams.

In 1994, she was awarded the Heinrich Maria Ledig-Rowohlt Prize and in 2002 received the Helmut M. Braem Translator Prize for her outstanding translations of the literary works from English to German.
