= Ulrich Noethen =

German actor (born 1959)

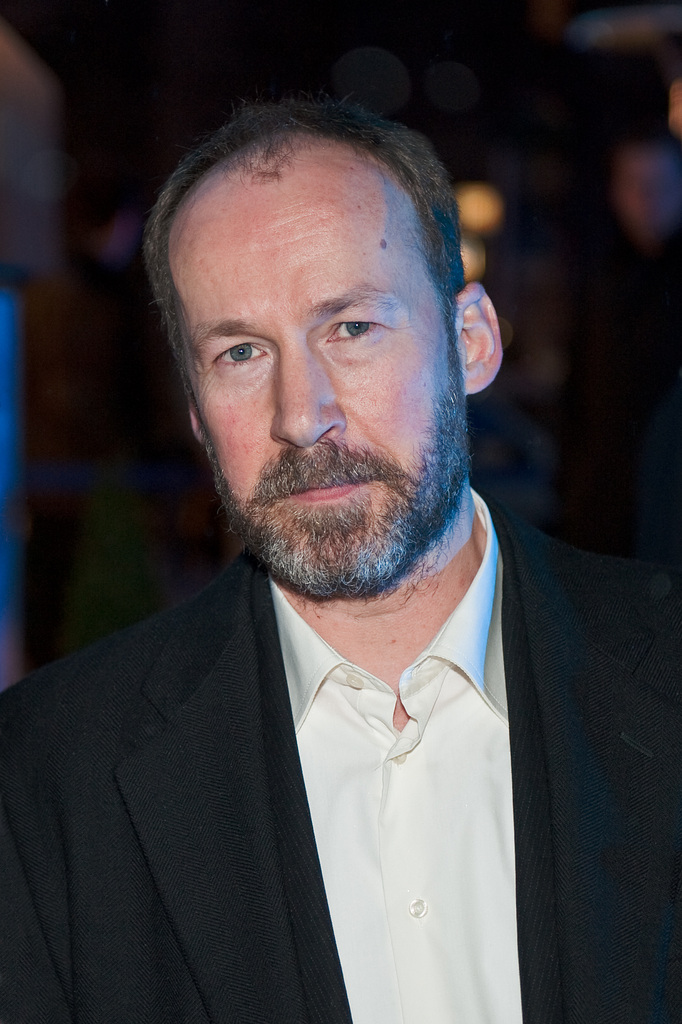
- Noethen in 2010
- Born: Ulrich Schmidt; 18 November 1959 (age 67); Munich, West Germany
- Education: State University of Music and Performing Arts Stuttgart
- Occupation: Actor
- Years active: 1995-present
- Organization: German Acting Association
- Notable work: Der Untergang

Ulrich Noethen (born 18 November 1959) is a German actor who has appeared in many movies and TV films.

He starred in Comedian Harmonists. He also played Heinrich Himmler twice, in Der Untergang and Mein Führer – Die wirklich wahrste Wahrheit über Adolf Hitler.

Noethen has won various awards for his acting, including the German Film Award, the Bavarian Film Award, the Adolf Grimme Award and the Golden Camera.

== Life ==
Noethen grew up as the youngest of five children in a clergyman's family. The family initially lived in Neu-Ulm on the Danube, where his father, Klaus-Peter Schmid (1920-2018), was dean of the Evangelical Lutheran Church. Later the family moved to Augsburg, where he graduated from the Gymnasium bei St. Anna. Ulrich initially studied law for a short time, but later he followed an acting course at the University of Music and Performing Arts Stuttgart. Ulrich Schmidt adopted his mother's birth name (Noethen) as his stage name. He married the actress Friederike Wagner, with whom he has a daughter. The couple separated in 2005, after thirteen years of marriage, and divorced in 2009. Ulrich Noethen lives with Alina Bronsky and the three children from her first marriage in Berlin-Charlottenburg. The couple also have a daughter together.

== Work ==
=== Theater ===
From 1985 to 1987 he was a member of the ensemble of the Theater Freiburg. He then worked at the Zelt-Ensemble Birach until 1988 and then moved to the Schauspiel Köln for two years, where he worked under the direction of Frank Castorf and Max Färberböck, among others. He then moved to the Staatliche Schauspielbühnen Berlin. There he drew attention to himself through his performances in productions of Faust, Death and Devil and A Midsummer Night's Dream. When the Staatliche Schauspielbühnen Berlin closed, he switched to film acting.

=== Film ===
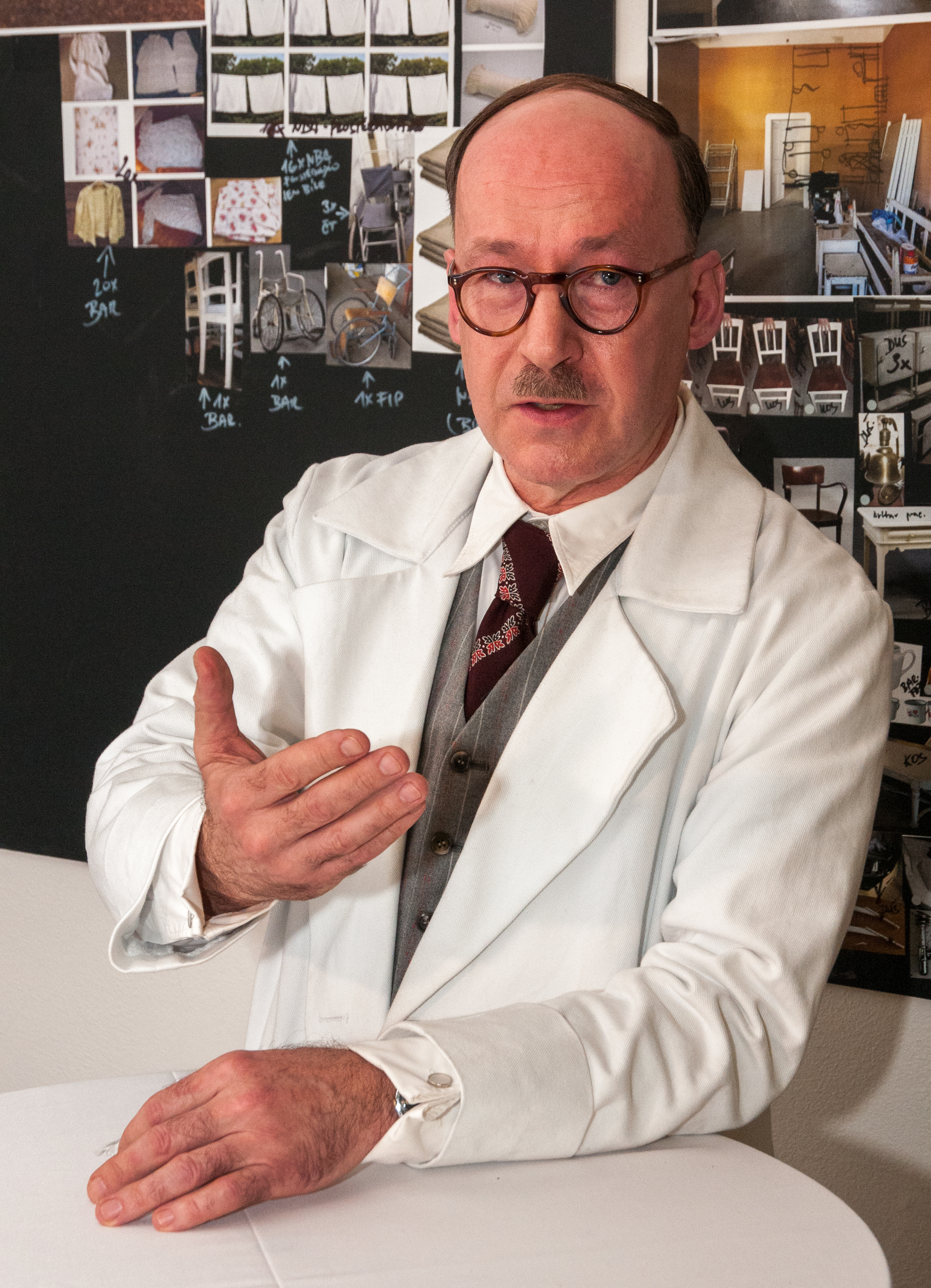
Ulrich Noethen as Ferdinand Sauerbruch, 2018

In 1995, he was able to see him for the first time in the TV series Die Partner. He appeared in Dominik Graf's Tatort episode Frau Bu lacht (1995) and in The Scorpion (1997). He was nominated for Best Supporting Actor for his role in The Scorpion.

In 1997, Ulrich Noethen was the year of his breakthrough as a film actor with the role of the acappella singer and arranger Harry Frommermann in the successful movie Comedian Harmonists. For his role, he was awarded the German Film Award for Best Actor in 1998 and, together with Ben Becker, Heino Ferch, Heinrich Schafmeister, Max Tidof and Kai Wiesinger, with the Bavarian Film Award. In 1997 he won the Bavarian Television Award for Best Actor in Der Ausbruch und Busenfreunde.

In 2000 he played the theatre critic and feuilletonist Kurt Tucholsky in the literary film Gripsholm, along with Heike Makatsch, Rudolf Wessely and Jasmin Tabatabai. In 2001, Noethen played the role of Mr. Taschenbier in Paul Maar's film The Sams. In the following years he remained true to the genre of cinema-family comedy with roles in Bibi Blocksberg (2002), The Flying Classroom after Erich Kästner as teacher Dr. Johann "Justus" Bökh (2003) and in the Das Sams sequel Sams in Danger (2003).

In 2004 he appeared in Oliver Hirschbiegel's film Downfall in the role of Heinrich Himmler, a role he played in 2007 in Dani Levy's black comedy My Führer – The Really Truest Truth about Adolf Hitler alongside Helge Schneider, Sylvester Groth and Ulrich Mühe in complete other interpretation. Also in 2004 he was seen in the TV drama The Boxer and the Hairdresser as gay star hairdresser Fränki Laue. In 2005 he impersonated the character of the father in the tragicomedy Polly Blue Eyes, alongside Matthias Schweighöfer and Meret Becker. In the same year he received a nomination for the German Television Award for his acting creation of the opaquely cool Bent Peerson in Carlo Rola's ZDF multi-parter The Patriarch with Iris Berben in the leading role.

In 2005 he was seen in The Airlift as returnee Dr. Alexander Kielberg, again alongside Heino Ferch and Ulrich Tukur. For his role he received the German Television Award for Best Supporting Actor. On February 2, 2006 he was awarded the Golden Camera for his role interpretations in The Airlift, The Boxer and the Friseuse, and Silver Wedding as Best German Actor.

In 2007 he impersonated the role of the husband Helmut Halm in Rainer Kaufmann's film Runaway Horse, which was adapted by Martin Walser alongside Ulrich Tukur and Katja Riemann. He was nominated for the German Film Award 2008 in the category of Best Actor. In 2009, Ulrich Noethen appeared as Commissioner Tabor Süd in two ZDF films based on Friedrich Ani's crime novels. For Commissioner Süd and the air guitarist, Noethen received the Adolf Grimme Prize as well as before for his leading role in Hermine Huntgeburth's TV two-part Devil's Roast. He was nominated for the German Film Award for his portrayal of the French monarch Charles IX in Jo Baier's historical film Henri 4 (2009).

In Hannah Arendt (2012), Noethen portrayed the philosopher Hans Jonas. Since 2014 he plays the psychiatrist Dr. Jessen in the TV series Neben der Spur. Noethen plays Anne's father Otto Heinrich Frank in the literary film Das Tagebuch der Anne Frank, which was shot in spring 2015 and was released in cinemas on 3 March 2016.

Noethen is a member of the German Acting Association (BFFS).

Noethen was originally supposed to play the role of Professor Boerne in the Münster Tatort from 2002, but was unable to maintain his original promise due to other interesting role offers that would have clashed with the long-term format Tatort.

== Selected filmography ==
- Comedian Harmonists (1997) - Harry Frommermann
- Viehjud Levi (1999) - Ingenieur Kohler
- Beresina, or the Last Days of Switzerland (1999) - Dr. Alfred Waldvogel
- Grüne Wüste (1999) - Detlef
- Bonhoeffer: Agent of Grace (2000) - Hans von Dohnanyi
- Gripsholm (2000) - Kurt
- Heirate mir! (2001) - Eugen Schafmeyer
- Vera Brühne (2001, TV miniseries) - Prosecutor Böck
- Das Sams (2001) - Bruno Taschenbier
- Francisca (2002) - Helmut Busch / Bruno Müller
- I'm the Father (2002) - Nico Ellermann
- Bibi Blocksberg (2002) - Bernhard Blocksberg
- The Flying Classroom (2003) - Dr. Johann 'Justus' Bökh
- Sams in Gefahr (2003) - Bruno Taschenbier
- Jargo (2004) - Schuldirektor
- Downfall (2004) - Heinrich Himmler
- Off Beat (2004) - Prof. Olivari
- Bibi Blocksberg and the Secret of the Blue Owls (2004) - Bernhard Blocksberg
- Polly Blue Eyes (2005) - Herbert Pinn
- The Airlift (2005, TV film) - Dr. Alexander Kielberg
- TKKG: The Secret of the Mysterious Mind Machine (2006) - Herr Manek
- Life Actually (2006) - Roland Spatz
- My Führer – The Really Truest Truth about Adolf Hitler (2007) - Heinrich Himmler
- Runaway Horse (2007) - Helmut Halm
- What if Death Do Us Part? (2008) - Joachim Hellwig
- Long Shadows (2008) - Bernd Widmer
- Henri 4 (2010) - Charles IX
- Rumpe & Tuli (2010) - Therapeut
- Hindenburg: The Last Flight (2011, TV film) - Kapitän Lehmann
- The Man with the Bassoon (2011, TV film) - Rudi Bockelmann
- Cracks in the Shell (2011) - Kaspar Friedmann
- The Invisible Girl (2011, TV film) - Wilhelm Michel
- Sams im Glück (2012) - Bruno Taschenbier
- Moon Man (2012) - The Father (voice, German version)
- A Coffee in Berlin (2012) - Walter Fischer
- Hannah Arendt (2012) - Hans Jonas
- Eine Hand wäscht die andere (2012, TV film) - Chlodwig Pullmann
- Broken Glass Park (2013) - Volker Trebur
- Pettson & Findus: Fun Stuff (2014) - Pettson
- Deutschland 83 (2015, TV series, 8 episodes) - General Wolfgang Edel
- The General Case (2016, TV film) - Fritz Bauer
- Das Tagebuch der Anne Frank (2016) - Otto Frank
- NSU German History X: The Investigators (2016, TV film) - Helmut Roewer
- Charité (2019, TV series, 6 episodes) - Ferdinand Sauerbruch
- The German Lesson (2019) - Jens Ole Jepsen
