= The Unicorn (1978 film) =

- Directed by: Peter Patzak
- Written by: Dorothee Dhan; Martin Walser (novel)
- Produced by: Gunther Malzacher
- Starring: Peter Vogel; Gila von Weitershausen; Christiane Rücker
- Cinematography: Ulrich Burtin
- Edited by: Bernd Lorbiecki
- Music by: Peter Zwetkoff
- Production companies: Artus-Film; Südwestfunk
- Distributed by: Warner-Columbia Filmverleih
- Release date: 29 September 1978
- Running time: 111 minutes
- Country: West Germany
- Language: German

The Unicorn (German: Das Einhorn) is a 1978 West German drama film directed by Peter Patzak and starring Peter Vogel, Gila von Weitershausen and Christiane Rücker. It is based on the novel of the same title by Martin Walser.

== Cast ==
- Peter Vogel as Anselm Kristlein
- Gila von Weitershausen as Birga Kristlein
- Miriam Spoerri as Melanie Sugg, Verlegerin
- Christiane Rücker as Barbara Salzer
- Lucie Visser as Orli
- Anton Diffring as Blomich
- Lilian Rack as Rosa
- Isolde Barth as Maria
- Harald von Koeppelle as Beumann
- Hans Helmut Dickow as Nacke Dominik Brout
- Helmut Fischer as Dr. Blagge
- Emmerich Schäfer as Karsch
- Sepp Wäsche as Gustav Janzen
- Gerd Eichen as Heinrich Müller
- Hannes Kaetner as Riedessen
- Hans Reiser as Urologe
- Lutz Hilbert as Bamber
- Elma Karlowa as die Grüne
- Jochen Jahn as Dr. Klüsel
- Eberhard Steib as Fabrikant
- Klaus-Dieter König as Dr. Hornseifer
- Manfred Boehm as Pater Achtwein
- Helmut Wüstmann as Autoverkäufer

== Bibliography ==
- Eric Rentschler. German Film & Literature. Routledge, 2013.
