= Mark Zak =

German actor and author

Mark Zak (born 1959 in Lviv) is a German actor, author and playwright. Since 1990 he has appeared in over a hundred German and international films, including The Tourist and Bridge of Spies.

== Biography ==
Zak grew up in Odessa and emigrated to West Germany in 1974. He attended the Der Keller acting school in Cologne.

His first novel Glaube, Liebe, Mafia: Ein Fall für Josif Bondar was published in 2013, followed by his play Begleitagentin in 2015. His book about ukrainian anarchist Nestor Makhno "Erinnert euch an mich – über Nestor Machno" was published in 2018.

== Partial filmography ==
- 1989: Follow Me – Soldat
- 1990: The Man Inside – Aide To Borges
- 1995: Bohai Bohau (TV Movie)
- 1996: Kriegsbilder
- 1999: Pola X – Romanian friend
- 1999: Bang Boom Bang – Rumäne 1
- 2000: Mister Boogie
- 2000–2004: Tatort (TV Series) – Dr. Oleg Buykov / Boris / Jens Falter
- 2001: Enemy at the Gates – Russian Captain at Headquarters
- 2002: A Map of the Heart (German: Der Felsen) – Schweigsamer Legionär
- 2002: Hotte in Paradise (TV Movie) – Gregor
- 2003: Der Puppengräber – Junger Russe
- 2004: A2 Racer – Monteur Jerzy
- 2004: Such mich nicht – Georgier – 2. Mordopfer
- 2004: Agnes and His Brothers (German: Agnes und seine Brüder) – Türsteher
- 2006: Goldene Zeiten – Alexeji
- 2006: Klimt – Hevesi
- 2006: Fay Grim – Saudi Spy
- 2006: When Darkness Falls – Tyske kriminalaren
- 2007: Beautiful Bitch – Vasile
- 2008: Speed Racer – Blackjack Benelli
- 2008: Balkan Traffic – Damir
- 2009: Miss Stinnes Motors Round the World – Oleg
- 2009: Der gelbe Satin – Bilal Sahin
- 2010: Sasha – Mithäftling
- 2010: The Tourist – Shigalyov
- 2011: Der Himmel hat vier Ecken – Boris
- 2011: Wunderkinder – Samuel Kaplan (German exclusive)
- 2011: Tauwetter – Hoffmann (voice)
- 2011: The Man with the Bassoon (TV Movie) – Kropotkin (German exclusive)
- 2011: Hotel Lux – NKWD-Mann 2
- 2012: The Fourth State – Russian President
- 2012: Slave – Big Bald Guy
- 2014: Stereo – Gaspar
- 2014: Bridge of Spies – Soviet Judge – Powers' Trial
- 2018: Never Look Away – Dolmetscher Murawjow
- 2020: Spy City – Kovrin
