= Phillipsburg =

Phillipsburg may refer to the following places:

== United States ==
- Phillipsburg, Georgia
- Phillipsburg, Kansas
- Phillipsburg, Kentucky
- Dayton, Maine, named Phillipsburg until 1854
- Phillipsburg, Missouri
- Phillipsburg Township, Laclede County, Missouri, an inactive township
- Phillipsburg, New Jersey
- Phillipsburg, Ohio
- Monaca, Pennsylvania, named Phillipsburg until 1892
- Phillipsburg, Texas

== Other countries ==
- Phillipsburg, Ontario, Canada

== See also ==
- Philippsburg (disambiguation)
- Philipsburg (disambiguation)
