= Runaway Horse =

1978 novella by Martin Walser

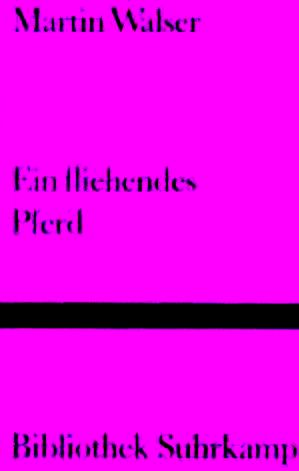
- Author: Martin Walser
- Original title: Ein fliehendes Pferd
- Translator: Leila Vennewitz
- Language: German
- Publication date: 1978
- Publication place: Germany
- English publication date: 1987

Runaway Horse (German: Ein fliehendes Pferd) is a 1978 novella by the German writer Martin Walser.

== Plot ==
Two men facing midlife crisis, Klaus Buch and Helmut Halm, are old school friends and meet by chance during vacation with their wives at Lake Constance. Their socialising during the vacation turns into a power struggle. Klaus boasts about his manliness whereas Helmut has come to terms with his ordinary and uneventful life.

== Reception ==
Runaway Horse was an immediate bestseller in Germany. It was published in an English translation by Leila Vennewitz in 1987.

== Adaptation ==
The novella is the basis for the 2007 film Runaway Horse.
