= Marriage in Philippsburg =

1957 novel by Martin Walser

- Original German language cover, Ehen in Philippsburg
- Author: Martin Walser
- Original title: Ehen in Philippsburg
- Language: German
- Publisher: Suhrkamp Verlag
- Publication date: 1957
- Publication place: Germany
- English publication date: 1960
- Pages: 419

Marriage in Philippsburg (German: Ehen in Philippsburg), also published in English as The Gadarene Club, is the debut novel of the German writer Martin Walser, published in 1957.

== Plot ==
The young man Hans Beumann leaves the countryside to try his luck in the city of Philippsburg (a fictionalized version of Stuttgart).

== Reception ==
Der Spiegel said Walser describes the phrases and power struggles of contemporary careerists "with sincere astonishment, but without reformatory zeal", exhibiting a "fair, albeit resigned disaffection".

The novel was awarded the Hermann-Hesse-Literaturpreis.

== Adaptation ==
Stephan Kimmig wrote a play based on the novel that premiered at the Schauspiel Stuttgart in 2017.
