= Rudolf Augstein =

German journalist (1923–2002)

Rudolf Augstein MdB
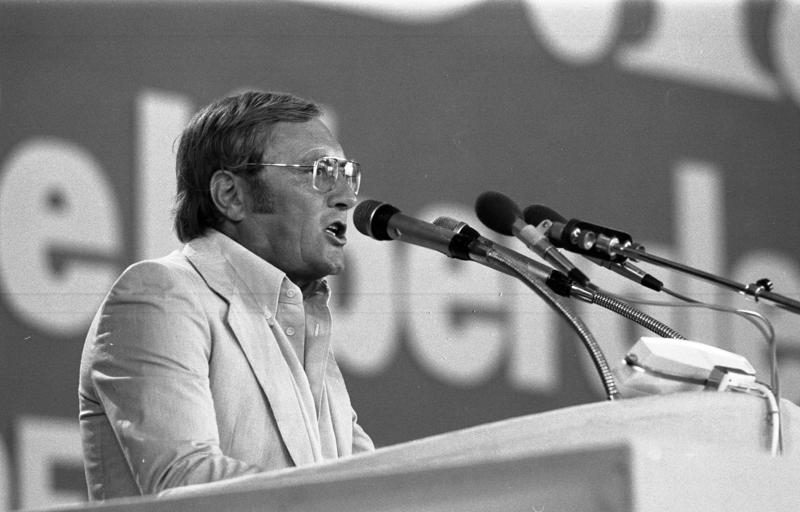
- Augstein at FDP-Bundesparteitag, 1980

Member of the Bundestag for North Rhine-Westphalia
- In office 19 November 1972 – 24 January 1973
- Preceded by: Wolfram Dorn
- Succeeded by: Rolf Böger

Personal details
- Born: Rudolf Karl Augstein; 5 November 1923 Hannover, Weimar Republic (now Germany)
- Died: 7 November 2002 (aged 79) Hamburg, Germany
- Resting place: Sylt, Schleswig-Holstein
- Party: FDP
- Spouses: Lore Ostermann (m. 1948; div. 1960) Katharina Luthardt (m. 1960; div. 1968) Maria Carlsson (m. 1968; div. 1970) Gisela Stelly (m. 1972; div. 1992) Anna Maria Hürtgen (m. 2000)
- Children: 4
- Occupation: journalist, editor, publicist, politician

Rudolf Karl Augstein (5 November 1923 – 7 November 2002) was a German journalist, editor, publicist, and politician. He was one of the most influential German journalists, founder and part-owner of Der Spiegel magazine. As a politician, he was a member of the Bundestag for the Free Democratic Party of Germany (FDP) between November 1972 and January 1973.

== Life and career ==
Born in Hanover, Germany, he was a radio operator and artillery observer in the Heer (the German Army) during World War II. By war's end, he held the rank of Leutnant der Reserve (reserve officer). He founded Der Spiegel in 1946/1947, which became (and still is) the most important investigative weekly magazine in Germany. During the Spiegel affair of 1961-62, he was arrested and jailed for 103 days, until Franz Josef Strauß was forced to resign as Minister of Defense under continuing protest from the public and the resignation of the FDP cabinet members. Augstein became a member of the West German parliament the Bundestag in 1972 for the Free Democrats for North Rhine-Westphalia, but resigned only a year later, to focus on his duties as a journalist. It has been speculated that he considered himself much more influential with his magazine than he ever was in the legislature.

An amateur historian, Augstein published several successful books, among them Preußens Friedrich und die Deutschen (1981, ISBN 3-89190-106-2), Otto von Bismarck (1990, ISBN 3-445-06012-6), and, about his lifetime opponent, Überlebensgroß Herr Strauß. Ein Spiegelbild (1983, ISBN 3-499-33002-4). During the Historikerstreit of 1986–1987, Augstein was fierce in his criticism of Ernst Nolte and Andreas Hillgruber for creating what Augstein called the "New Auschwitz Lie". A controversial statement by Augstein was his description of Hillgruber as a "constitutional Nazi". Augstein called for Hillgruber to be fired from his post at the University of Cologne for being a "constitutional Nazi", and argued that there was no moral difference between Hillgruber and other "constitutional Nazis" like Hans Globke. Augstein wrote in opposition to Nolte that:

Not for nothing did Nolte let us know that the annihilation of the kulaks, the peasant middle class, had taken place from 1927 to 1930, before Hitler seized power, and that the destruction of the Old Bolsheviks and countless other victims of Stalin's insanity had happened between 1934 and 1938, before the beginning of Hitler's war. But Stalin's insanity was, in contrast to Hitler's insanity, a realist's insanity. After all this drivel comes one thing worth discussing: whether Stalin pumped up Hitler and whether Hitler pumped up Stalin. This can be discussed, but the discussion does not address the issue. It is indeed possible that Stalin was pleased by how Hitler treated his bosom buddy Ernst Röhm and the entire SA leadership in 1934. It is not possible that Hitler began his war against Poland because he felt threatened by Stalin's regime ... One does not have to agree in everything with Konrad Adenauer. But in the light of the crass tendency to deny the co-responsibility of the Prussian-German Wehrmacht ("The oath! The oath!") ones gains an understanding for the point of the view of the nonpatriot Adenauer that Hitler's Reich was the continuation of the Prussian-German regime

Since Stefan Aust became editor-in-chief of Der Spiegel, Augstein retreated more and more to private life, although he continued to publish commentaries regularly in the magazine almost until his death. For his lifetime achievements for peace, civil liberties and freedom of the press he was honoured with the title "Journalist of the century" in 2000 by 101 German journalists. Augstein was among the International Press Institute's 50 World Press Freedom Hero laureates in 2000 for his role in the Spiegel affair.

In 1983 he received an Honorary Doctorate from the University of Bath.

Augstein married five times: including Maria Carlsson, a German translator, from 1968 until their divorce in 1970. The couple had two children; Franziska Augstein and Jakob Augstein. His fifth marriage, solemnized in Tonder on 13 October 2000, was to his long-standing companion, the Hamburg art dealer Anna Maria Hürtgen.

He died on 7 November 2002 from pneumonia and was buried on the island of Sylt.
