= Anselm Kristlein trilogy =

Three novels by the German writer Martin Walser

The Anselm Kristlein trilogy (German: Anselm-Kristlein-Trilogie) is three novels by the German writer Martin Walser. The trilogy consists of the novels Halbzeit (1960), The Unicorn (German: Das Einhorn) (1966, English 1971) and Der Sturz (1973), with a combined length of over 1500 pages.

The largely autobiographical novels centre on Anselm Kristlein as he makes a career as a salesman, advertising worker and eventually author. They concern life and consciousness in post-war West Germany. Kristlein appears as a detached dreamer but not an outsider, because no such thing can exist in the way the novels portray society akin to natural history.

The trilogy has been described as Walser's magnum opus. The Unicorn was the basis for the 1978 film The Unicorn and Der Sturz for the 1979 film Der Sturz.
