= Philipsburg, Pennsylvania =

Places with Philipsburg in the name in the state of Pennsylvania:

- Philipsburg, Centre County, Pennsylvania
  - North Philipsburg, Pennsylvania
  - South Philipsburg, Pennsylvania
- The borough of Monaca, Pennsylvania was first incorporated as Phillipsburg in 1840
