= Die Verteidigung der Kindheit =

1991 novel by Martin Walser

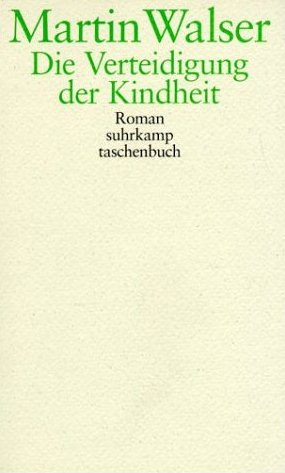
- Author: Martin Walser
- Language: German
- Publication date: 1991
- Publication place: Germany
- Pages: 540
- ISBN: 3-518-40380-X

Die Verteidigung der Kindheit (lit. 'The Defence of Childhood') is a 1991 novel by the German writer Martin Walser.

== Plot ==
The novel begins in 1953 and follows the sensitive and often unsuccessful middle-class German Alfred Dorn as he moves from Dresden to study law and have a career in West Germany, living for periods in West Berlin and Wiesbaden. It is based on the life of the lawyer Manfred Ranft (1929–1987).

== Reception ==
Because it deals with relationships between East and West Germany during the Cold War, many critics analyzed Die Verteidigung der Kindheit in relation to Walser's support for German reunification, which happened while he worked on the novel. In Der Spiegel, Joseph von Westphalen praised the descriptions of Germany in the 1950s and called Die Verteidigung der Kindheit one of Walser's funniest novels, writing that his "dry wit makes the pain it portrays endurable", and that the main character remains likeable despite being childish and hysterical.

The book sold more than 300,000 copies, making it one of Walser's best selling works.
