= A Gushing Fountain =

1998 novel by Martin Walser

- German language edition titled Ein springender Brunnen (1998)
- Author: Martin Walser
- Original title: Ein springender Brunnen
- Translator: David Dollenmayer
- Language: German
- Publisher: Suhrkamp Verlag
- Publication date: 1998
- Publication place: Germany
- English publication date: 2015
- Pages: 413
- ISBN: 3518410105

A Gushing Fountain (German: Ein springender Brunnen) is a 1998 autobiographical novel by the German writer Martin Walser. It is set in a German town at Lake Constance during the National Socialist period and follows the boy Johann as he comes of age. The book was published in English in 2015.
