= Johanna Walser =

German writer and translator (born 1957)

Johanna Walser (born 3 April 1957) is a German writer and translator.

== Biography ==
Johanna Walser was born in Ulm and is the daughter of the writer Martin Walser. She studied German studies and philosophy at the Free University of Berlin and the University of Konstanz. She debuted with the novella Vor dem Leben stehend in 1982. Her best known book is the novella Die Unterwerfung from 1986. Her books from the 1980s and 1990s gave her several awards and grants and were compared by critics to the works of Robert Walser, to whom she is not related. The critic Jürgen Wolf says there is a hidden religious dimension in her texts, which reveals itself in her affirmative passages about nature, descriptions of successful attempts "to be there" (da zu sein) and an equation between the good and God. Since the 1990s, Walser has primarily translated plays from French and English, sometimes in collaboration with her father.

== Bibliography ==
- Vor dem Leben stehend. Prosastücke, 1982. New edition Edition Isele, Eggingen 2010, ISBN 978-3-86142-481-9.
- Die Unterwerfung. Erzählung. Fischer Taschenbuchverlag, Frankfurt/M. 1986, ISBN 3-596-11448-9.
- Wetterleuchten. Erzählungen. Fischer Taschenbuchverlag, Frankfurt/M. 1991, ISBN 3-596-22370-9.
- Versuch, da zu sein. Prosa. 2 ed. Fischer Taschenbuchverlag, Frankfurt/M. 1998, ISBN 3-596-22395-4.
- Bodensee. Die vier Jahreszeiten. Stadler Verlag, Konstanz 1997, ISBN 3-7977-0359-7 (with Hella Wolff-Seybold)
- Am Wasser. Bilder. Sanssouci Verlag, Zürich 2000. ISBN 3-7254-1170-0 (with Quint Buchholz, photographs, and Martin Walser, text).
