= Alissa Walser =

German writer

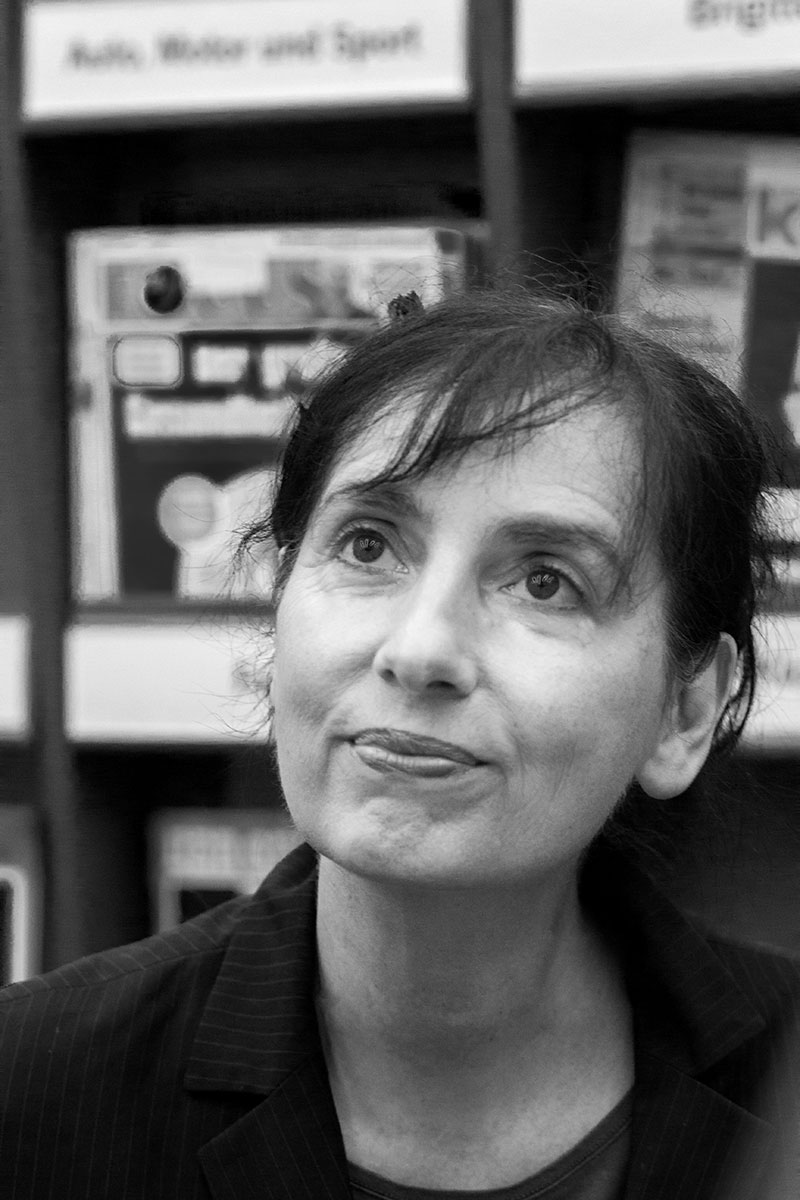
- Born: 1961 (age 64–65); Friedrichshafen, Baden-Württemberg, West Germany
- Occupations: Writer, artist

Signature
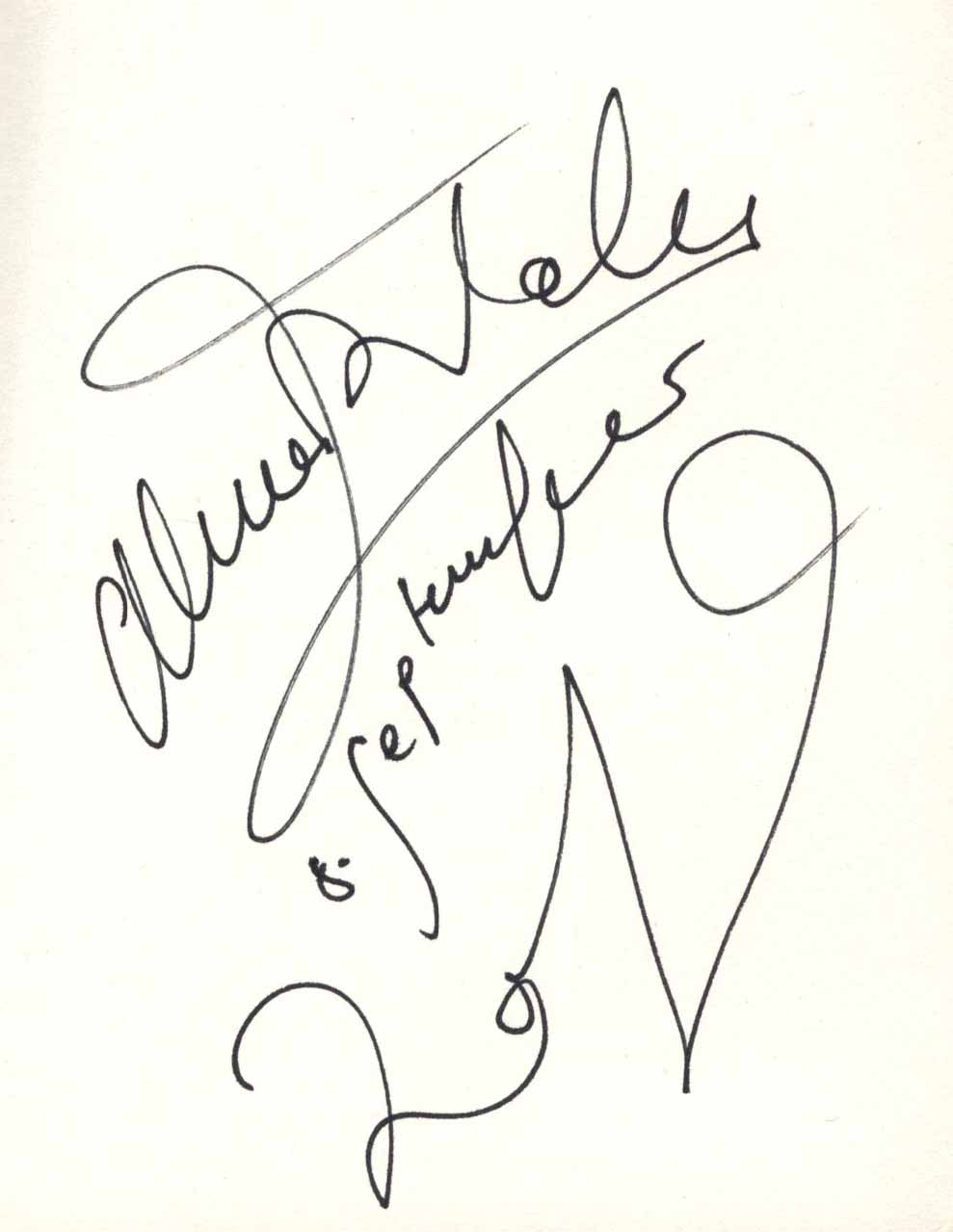

Alissa Walser (born 1961) is a German writer, translator, and artist. She was born in Friedrichshafen on Lake Constance. Her father is the German writer Martin Walser. She is known for her short stories, plays, novels, and translations. Many of her stories include drawings which seem to interrupt them but instead continue the narrative on a different level. She has won a number of German literary prizes.

== Life ==
From 1981 to 1986 Alissa Walser studied painting in Vienna and New York City. After 1990 she began publishing translations and fiction. She lives in Frankfurt am Main,Germany, and is married to Sascha Anderson.

== Works available in English ==
Mesmerized, her first novel (Am Anfang war die Nacht Musik, 2010), has been translated into English by Jamie Bulloch. It retells the encounter of the blind eighteenth-century pianist and composer Maria Theresia Paradis and the healing attempt by the scandalous doctor Franz Anton Mesmer. The original book cover for the German edition is based on a drawing by Walser of a glass harmonica, an eighteenth-century musical instrument. Barbara Albert directed a film adaptation under the title Mademoiselle Paradis (Licht, 2017).

Painting in a Man's World: Four Stories about Berthe Morisot, Mary Cassatt, Eva Gonzalès, Marie Bracquemond by Diane Broeckhoven, Noëlle Châtelet, Annette Pehnt, Alissa Walser. Hatje Cantz, 2008. ISBN 978-3-7757-2077-9

Several stories appeared in English translation in journals such as Open City (vol. 8, 2000) and Grand Street.

== Translations into German (Selection) ==
=== Prose and poetry ===
- Diane Glancy: Kriegstanz. Frankfurt 1995.
- Sylvia Plath: Max Nix. Frankfurt 1996.
- Sylvia Plath: Die Tagebücher. Frankfurt 1997.
- Kay Boyle: Das kleine Kamel. Frankfurt 1998.
- Robert Barry: Ein kleines Stück vom Glück. Frankfurt 1999.
- Anne Carson: Glas, Ironie und Gott. München 2000.
- Paula Fox: Louisa. München 2005.
- Sylvia Plath: Ariel. English and German. Frankfurt 2008.
- Mary Miller: Süßer König Jesus. Berlin 2013.
- Elizabeth Harrower: In gewissen Kreisen. Berlin 2016.
- Mary Miller: Big World. Storys. München 2017.
- Elizabeth Harrower: Die Träume der anderen. Berlin 2019.
- Margaret Atwood: Die Füchsin: Gedichte 1965–1995. Berlin Verlag, Berlin 2020. Kindle and ISBN 978-3827013866

=== Theater plays ===
- Joyce Carol Oates: Ontologischer Beweis meines Daseins. Frankfurt a. M. 1985.
- Joyce Carol Oates: Tone clusters. Reinbek 1990.
- Joyce Carol Oates: Nackt steh ich vor euch. Reinbek 1990.
- Brock Norman Brock: Da ist Monster. Reinbek 1991.
- Joyce Carol Oates: Die Mondfinsternis. Reinbek 1991.
- Janusz Głowacki: Antigone in New York. 1994.
- Jon Robin Baitz: Vom wahren Feuer. Reinbek 1995.
- Marsha Norman: Nacht, Mutter. Reinbek 2002.
- Christopher Hampton: Die Methode. Reinbek 2003.
- Several plays by Edward Albee (together with Martin Walser).

== Exhibits (selection) and art works ==
- Sprachlaub oder: Wahr ist, was schön ist. Texts by Martin Walser, water colors by Alissa Walser. Rowohlt, 2021. ISBN 978-3498002398 (German Edition)
- The small work show, BACA Downton, NY, 1984
- Small work, big ideas, PAN Art Gallery, NY, 1985
- The new show, Chameleon Gallery, Brooklyn, NY, 1986
- Kunstlichtgalerie, Konstanz, 1998
- Dichtung und Wahrheit, Arte Giani, Frankfurt a. M., 1999
- Kunstraum Brüssel, Belgien, 2001
- Städtische Galerie Backnang, 2001
- Text und Bild, Städtische Wessenberg-Galerie Konstanz, 2001
- Arte Giani, Frankfurt a. M., 2002
- Deutsche Structured Finance, Frankfurt a. M., 2004
- Städtische Wessenberg-Galerie Konstanz, 2005
- Galerie Buchhandlung Lesezeichen, Dresden, 2006
- Galerie Brandstätter, Baden-Baden, 2006
- Galerie Pabst, München, 2007
- Literaturhaus Stuttgart, 2007

== Awards (selection) ==
- 1992: Ingeborg Bachmann Prize
- 2009: Paul Scheerbart Prize (Heinrich Maria Ledig-Rowohlt Foundation) for the translation of poems by Sylvia Plath
- 2017: Ten-week London scholarship from the German Literature Fund, as Writer-in-Residence at Queen Mary University of London (spring 2018)
