= Martin Walser =

German writer (1927–2023)

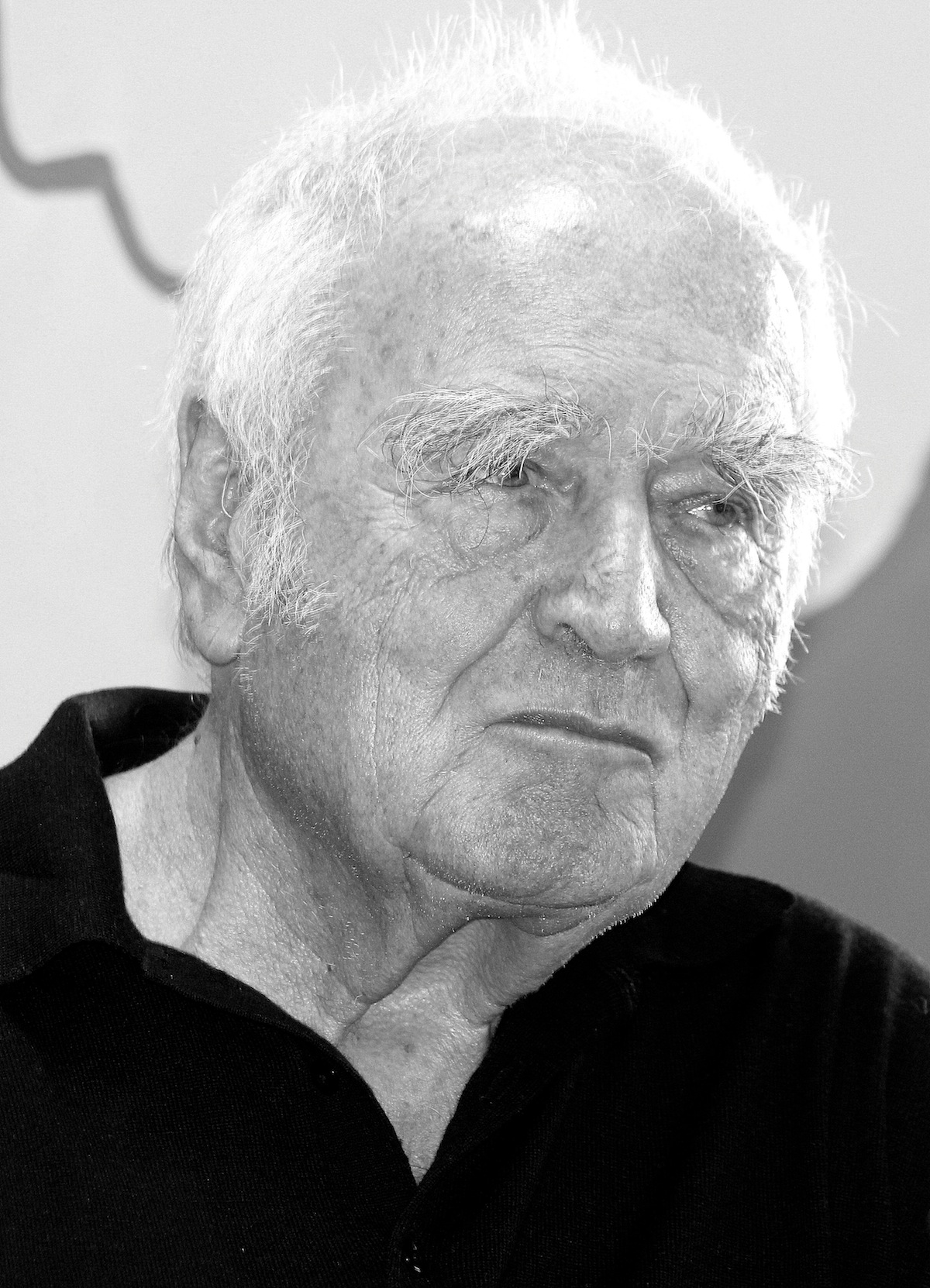
- Walser in 2013
- Born: 24 March 1927; Wasserburg am Bodensee, Bavaria, German Reich
- Died: 26 July 2023 (aged 96); Nussdorf, Baden-Württemberg, Germany
- Education: University of Regensburg; University of Tübingen
- Occupation: Novelist
- Writing career
- Period: 1955–2023
- Notable work: Runaway Horse
- Notable awards: Georg Büchner Prize; Peace Prize of the German Book Trade

Martin Johannes Walser (German: [ˈmaʁ.tiːn ˈvalˌzɐ]; 24 March 1927 – 26 July 2023) was a German writer, known especially as a novelist. He began his career as journalist for Süddeutscher Rundfunk, where he wrote and directed audio plays. He was a member of Group 47 from 1953 on.

His first novel, Marriage in Philippsburg, a satirical portrait of postwar society, became a success in 1957. Walser then turned to freelance writing. He published a trilogy of novels about the character Anselm Kristlein, beginning with Halbzeit in 1960, Das Einhorn (The Unicorn) in 1966 and ending with Der Sturz (The Fall) in 1973. Most of his major works have been translated into English, including the 1978 novella Runaway Horse, which was successful with both readers and critics. He also wrote plays (Die Zimmerschlacht), screenplays, story collections and essays. Several of his books have been adapted to the screen, including Runaway Horse in 1986 and again in 2007.

Walser received many awards, including the Georg Büchner Prize in 1981 and the Peace Prize of the German Publishers' Association in 1998. His acceptance speech for the Peace Prize caused controversy with Walser's remarks on German commemoration of the Holocaust. The "monumentalization of shame", he said, risks turning remembrance of the Holocaust into a "lip service" ritual. In 2002, Walser's portrayal of the literary critic Marcel Reich-Ranicki in his novel Tod eines Kritikers ("Death of a Critic") was regarded as antisemitic.

Walser is regarded, along with Heinrich Böll, Günter Grass, and Siegfried Lenz, as one of Germany's most influential postwar authors.

== Early life and education ==
Walser was born on 24 March 1927 in Wasserburg, on Lake Constance. His parents were coal merchants who also kept an inn next to the train station in Wasserburg. The second of three children, Walser lost his father at age ten. He described the environment in which he grew up in his novel A Gushing Fountain. From 1938 to 1943 he attended the secondary school in Lindau, until his induction to the armed forces, initially as an anti-aircraft auxiliary. According to documents released in June 2007, he became a member of the Nazi Party on 20 April 1944 at age 17. Walser denied that he knowingly entered the party, and assumed that he was enrolled by a garrison commander as part of a larger group without his knowledge. The claim was disputed by Hans-Dieter Kreikamp from the German Federal Archives, who said that a personal signature was formally required, even in times of war. By the end of the Second World War, Walser was a soldier in the Wehrmacht.

After the war, he completed his Abitur in Lindau in 1946. He then studied literature, history, and philosophy at the University of Regensburg and the University of Tübingen, achieving his doctorate in literature in 1951 with a thesis on Franz Kafka.

== Career ==
While studying, Walser worked as a reporter for the Süddeutscher Rundfunk broadcasting company, and wrote and directed his first audio plays. He travelled to Czechoslovakia, England, France, Italy, and Poland as part of his job. In 1950 Walser married Katharina "Käthe" Neuner-Jehle; the couple had four daughters.

Beginning in 1953, Walser was regularly invited to conferences of the Group 47, which was focused on literature for a new democratic Germany. The group awarded him a prize for his story Templones Ende in 1955. His first novel, Marriage in Philippsburg, was published in 1957. Like his later books, it was set in Southern Germany in a postwar society, and satirically portrayed the "conservative middle class" during the "so-called economic miracle". The novel first appeared in English three years later as The Gadarene Club.

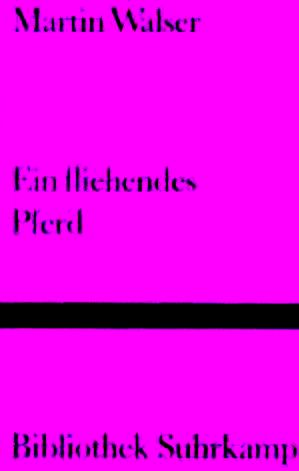
Title page of Ein fliehendes Pferd

The book became a huge success, which enabled Walser to work as a freelance author and reside in Friedrichshafen. In 1958 Walser lived in the U.S. for three months and participated in the Harvard International Seminary. He returned to the U.S. several times, invited by American universities to observe political conditions there.

Walser's most famous and best-selling work was the novella Runaway Horse, published in 1978. It was both a commercial and a critical success, and was described as "Walser's most beautiful and mature book and a masterful, searing critique of society".

In 2004 Walser left his long-time publisher Suhrkamp Verlag for Rowohlt Verlag after the death of the Suhrkamp director Siegfried Unseld. An unusual clause in his contract with Suhrkamp allowed him to take the publishing rights to all his works with him. According to Walser, a key reason for the switch was the lack of active support by Suhrkamp during the controversy over his novel Tod eines Kritikers (Death of a Critic).

Walser was a member of the Akademie der Künste in Berlin, the Sächsische Akademie der Künste, the Deutsche Akademie für Sprache und Dichtung in Darmstadt, and the German P.E.N.

In 2007 the German political magazine Cicero placed Walser second on its list of the 500 most important German intellectuals, behind Pope Benedict XVI and ahead of Nobel Prize winner Günter Grass.

== Work ==
Walser's subjects were often broken heroes who found it difficult to live up to the requirements of society or their own expectations. Walser said: "I think that world literature is about losers. That's just the way it is. From Antigone to Josef K. — there are no winners, no champions. And furthermore, anyone can confirm that in their circle of acquaintances: People are always more interesting when they are losing than when they are winning."

He wrote his most successful book, the novella Runaway Horse, in just two weeks. Its protagonists are two very different men, former school friends who experience a mid-life crisis.

Walser's books have been translated into many languages. In 2007 he gave many of his manuscripts to the Deutsches Literaturarchiv Marbach for preservation. Some of them feature in a permanent exhibition at the Literaturmuseum der Moderne in Marbach, including Ein springender Brunnen.

=== Death of a Critic ===
In his 2002 roman-à-clef Death of a Critic, Walser, who disliked literary critics in general, denounced one of the most prominent in Germany, Marcel Reich-Ranicki of the Frankfurter Allgemeine Zeitung (FAZ). Critics characterized his portrayal as "playing on numerous anti-Semitic cliches". The novel caused a scandal, especially in view of Reich-Ranicki's Jewish heritage and Walser's former membership in the Nazi Party. The novel was hotly debated even before it was released. Frank Schirrmacher, editor of the FAZ, refused to print an advance excerpt in the paper, as had traditionally been done for Walser's books.

In May 2010, Reich-Ranicki commented in an interview with Der Spiegel: "I don't think he is an anti-Semite. But it is important to him to demonstrate that the critic who allegedly tortured him most is also a Jew. He expects his public to follow him in this. You see, there never was an anti-Semitic line or remark from Grass, not one. And I certainly haven't written only positively about his books." After the scandal, Walser was not welcome in the U.S. for a long time.

== Political engagement ==
Walser was known for his political activity. In 1961, he was the first literary writer to support the Social Democratic Party of Germany (SPD) in an election campaign.

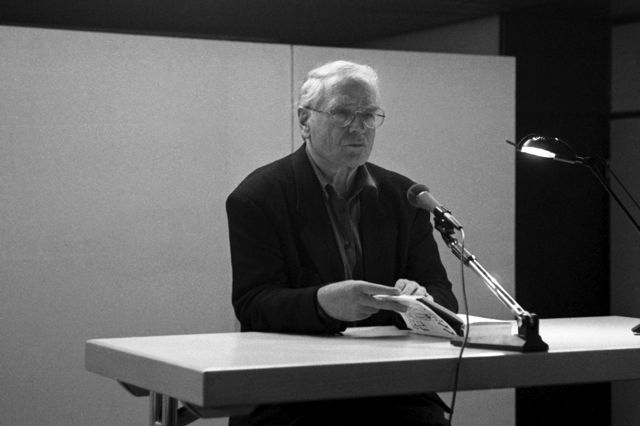
Walser at a reading in Germany, 1992

In 1964, Walser attended the Frankfurt Auschwitz Trial, and was involved in protests against the Vietnam War. During the late 1960s, Walser, like many German left intellectuals, including Günter Grass, supported Willy Brandt for chancellor of West Germany.

In the 1960s and 1970s, Walser moved further to the left and was considered a sympathizer of the DKP, the newly formed West German Communist Party. He was friends with leading German Marxists such as Robert Steigerwald and even visited Moscow during this time. By the 1980s, Walser began shifting back to the political right. In 1988 he gave a series of lectures titled "Speeches about One's Own Country" in which he made clear that he considered the division of Germany a painful and intolerable gulf. This was also the topic of his story "Dorle und Wolf".

== Personal life ==
In 1950, Walser married Katharina ("Käthe") Neuner-Jehle. The couple had four daughters: the actress Franziska Walser, the writer and painter Alissa Walser, the writer Johanna Walser, and the writer Theresia Walser. German journalist Jakob Augstein is Walser's son from a relationship with translator Maria Carlsson.

Walser died in Nussdorf on 26 July 2023, at age 96.

== Awards ==
Walser was awarded the Hermann Hesse Prize in 1957 for his first novel. He received the Georg Büchner Prize in 1981, the Ricarda Huch Prize of Darmstadt in 1990, the Peace Prize of the German Book Trade in 1998, and the Friedrich Nietzsche Prize in 2015 for his life's achievements, among many other awards.

=== Peace Prize of the German Book Trade ===
In 1998 Walser was awarded the Peace Prize of the German Book Trade. His acceptance speech, given at St. Paul's Church in Frankfurt, invoked issues of historical memory and political engagement in contemporary German politics and unleashed a controversy that roiled German intellectual circles. Walser's acceptance speech was titled: "Erfahrungen beim Verfassen einer Sonntagsrede" (Experiences while drafting a soap box speech): (Note: Jeder kennt unsere geschichtliche Last, die unvergängliche Schande, kein Tag, an dem sie uns nicht vorgehalten wird. [...] wenn mir aber jeden Tag in den Medien diese Vergangenheit vorgehalten wird, merke ich, daß sich in mir etwas gegen diese Dauerpräsentation unserer Schande wehrt. Anstatt dankbar zu sein für die unaufhörliche Präsentation unserer Schande, fange ich an wegzuschauen. Wenn ich merke, daß sich in mir etwas dagegen wehrt, versuche ich, die Vorhaltung unserer Schande auf Motive hin abzuhören und bin fast froh, wenn ich glaube, entdecken zu können, daß öfter nicht mehr das Gedenken, das Nichtvergessendürfen das Motiv ist, sondern die Instrumentalisierung unserer Schande zu gegenwärtigen Zwecken. Immer guten Zwecken, ehrenwerten. Aber doch Instrumentalisierung. [...] Auschwitz eignet sich nicht, dafür Drohroutine zu werden, jederzeit einsetzbares Einschüchterungsmittel oder Moralkeule oder auch nur Pflichtübung. Was durch Ritualisierung zustande kommt, ist von der Qualität des Lippengebets. [...] In der Diskussion um das Holocaustdenkmal in Berlin kann die Nachwelt einmal nachlesen, was Leute anrichteten, die sich für das Gewissen von anderen verantwortlich fühlten. Die Betonierung des Zentrums der Hauptstadt mit einem fußballfeldgroßen Alptraum. Die Monumentalisierung der Schande.)

Everybody knows our historical burden, the never ending shame, not a day on which the shame is not presented to us. [...] But when every day in the media this past is presented to me, I notice that something inside me is opposing this permanent show of our shame. Instead of being grateful for the continuous show of our shame — I start looking away. I would like to understand why in this decade the past is shown like never before. When I notice that something within me is opposing it, I try to hear the motives of this reproach of our shame, and I am almost glad when I think I can discover that more often not the remembrance, the not-allowed-to-forget is the motive, but the exploitation / utilization [Instrumentalisierung] of our shame for current goals. Always for the right purpose, for sure. But yet the exploitation. [...] Auschwitz is not suitable for becoming a routine-of-threat, an always available intimidation or a moral club [Moralkeule] or also just an obligation. What is produced by ritualisation has the quality of a lip service [...]. The debate about the Holocaust Memorial in Berlin will show, in posterity, what people do who feel responsible for the conscience of others. Turning the centre of the capital into concrete with a nightmare [Alptraum], the size of a football pitch. Turning shame into monument.

At first the speech caused no great stir; the audience received the speech with applause, though Ignatz Bubis, president of the Central Council of Jews in Germany, did not applaud, as confirmed by television footage of the event. Some days after the event, and again on 9 November, the 60th anniversary of the Kristallnacht pogrom against German Jews, Bubis accused Walser of "intellectual arson" (geistige Brandstiftung) and claimed that Walser's speech was both "trying to block out history or, respectively, to eliminate the remembrance" and pleading "for a culture of looking away and thinking away". Then the controversy started. As described by Karsten Luttmer: Walser replied by accusing Bubis to have stepped out of dialogue between people. Walser and Bubis met on 12 December to discuss the heated controversy and settle the dispute. Bubis withdrew his claim that Walser had been intentionally incendiary, and Walser maintained that his speech was unambiguous. They agreed that no appropriate language had yet been found to deal with Germany's past.

== Works ==
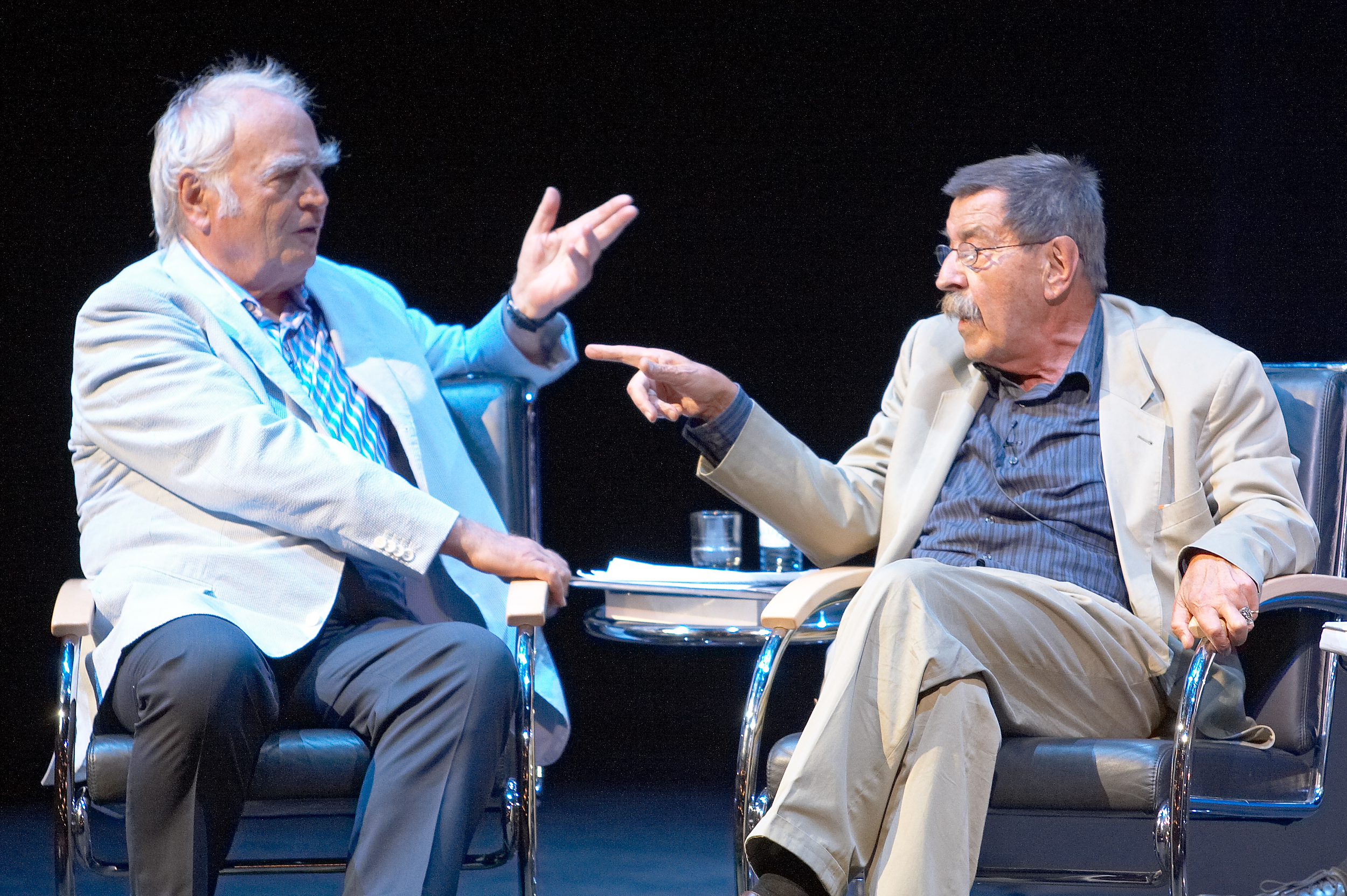
Walser (l.) and Grass at a meeting of members of Group 47, 2007

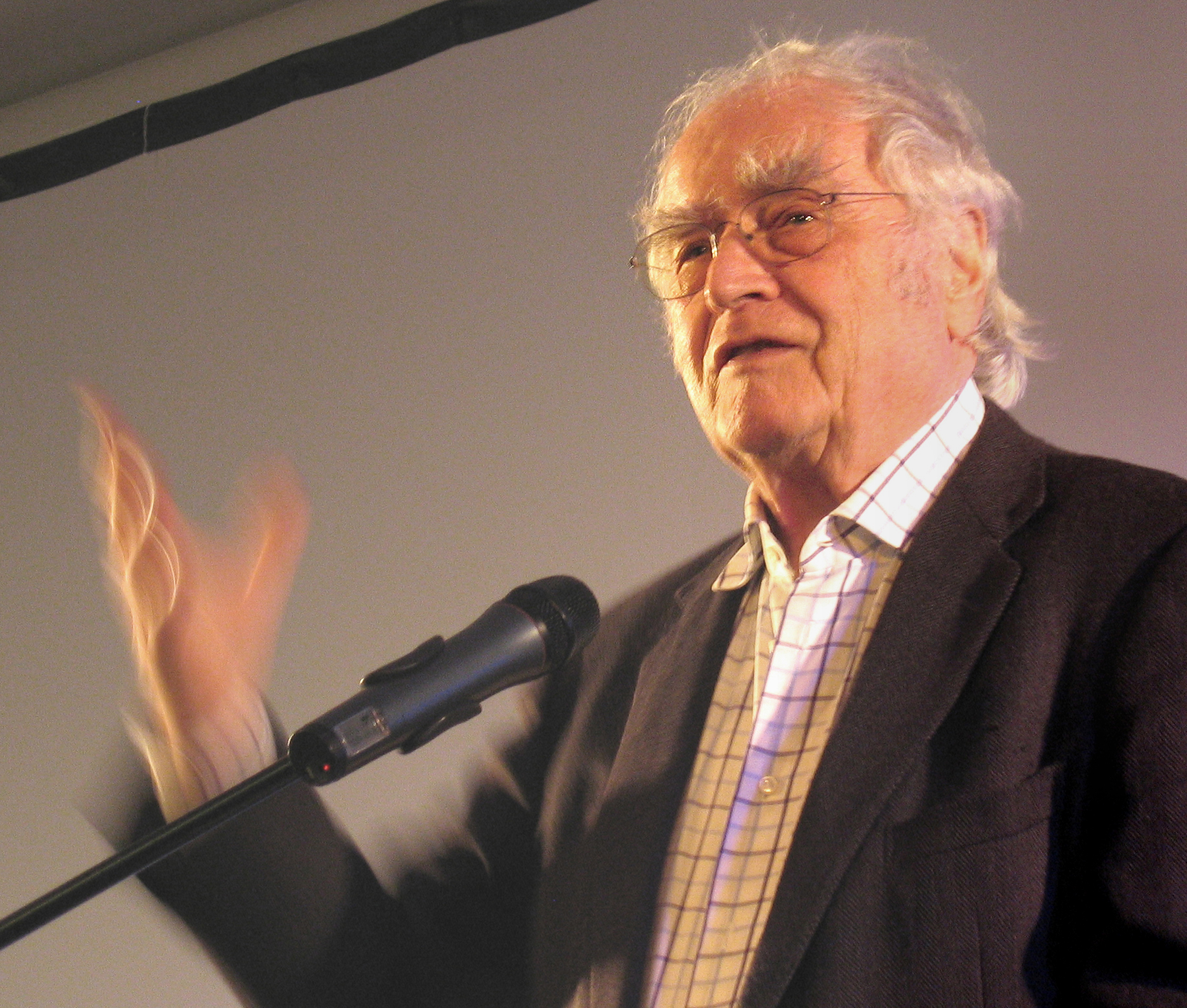
Walser in 2008

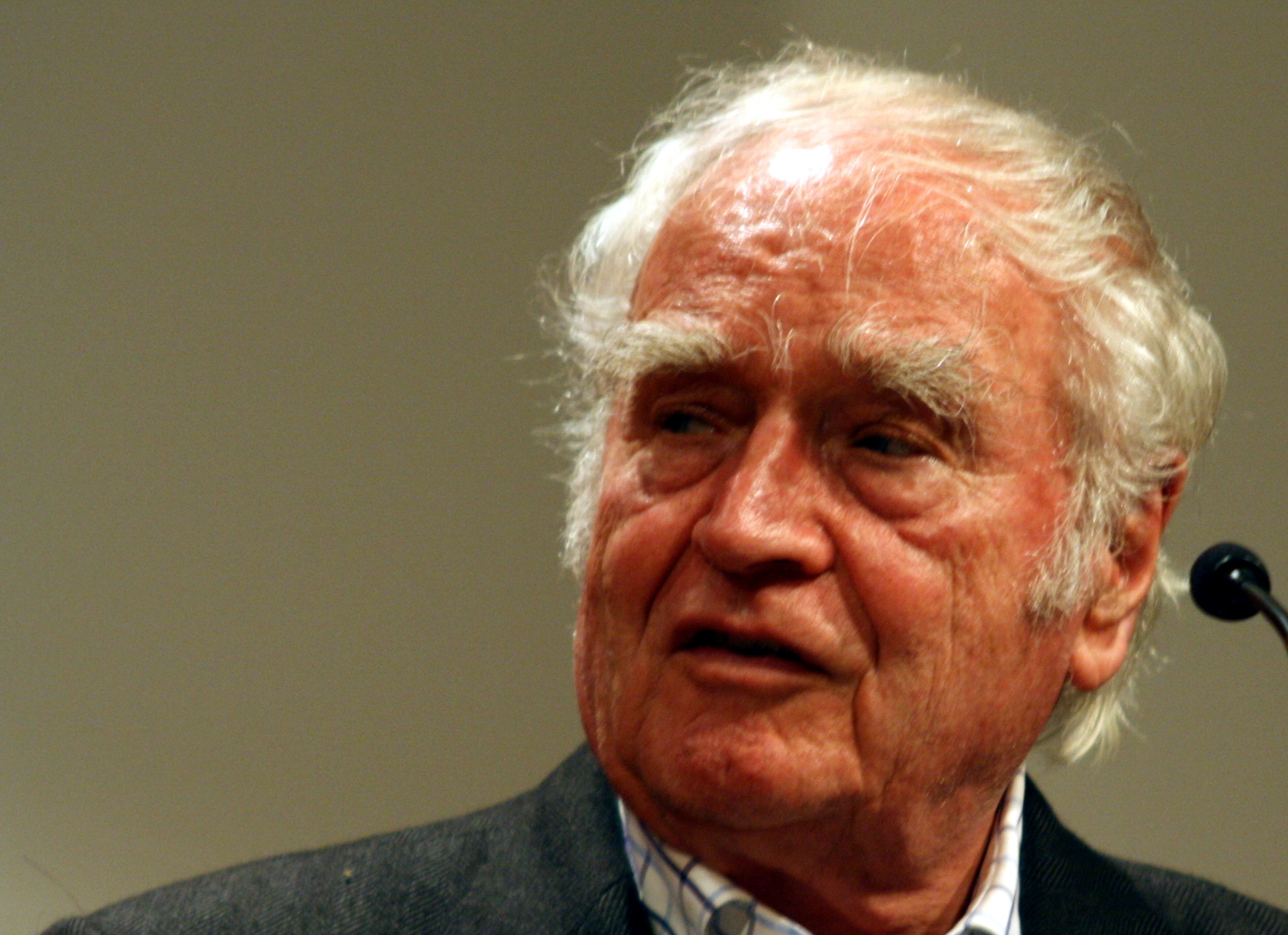
Walser in 2010

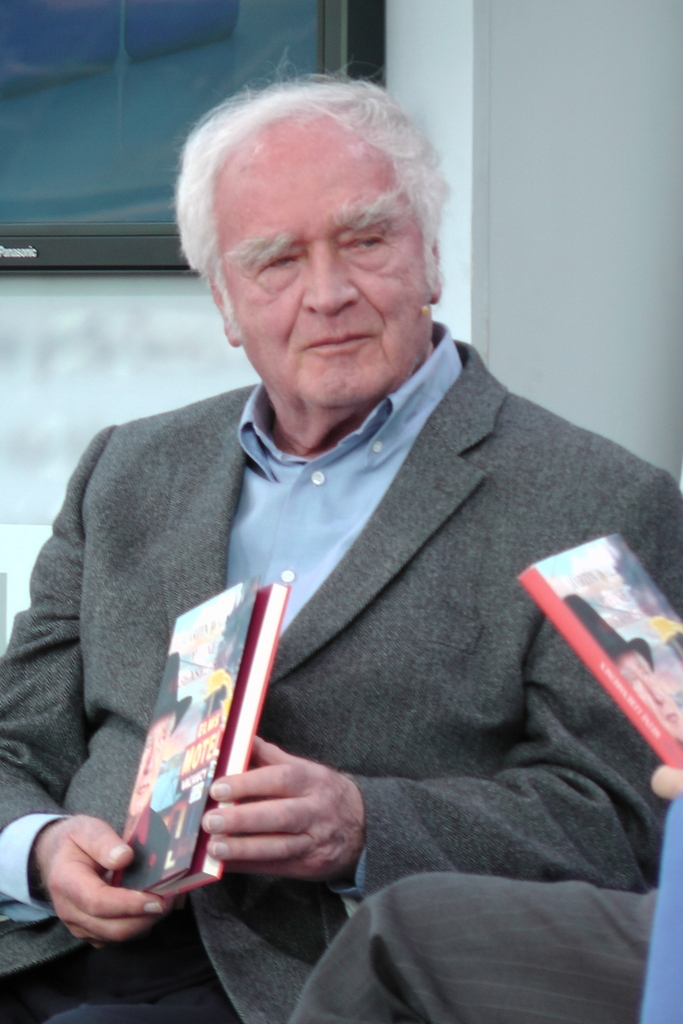
Walser in 2012

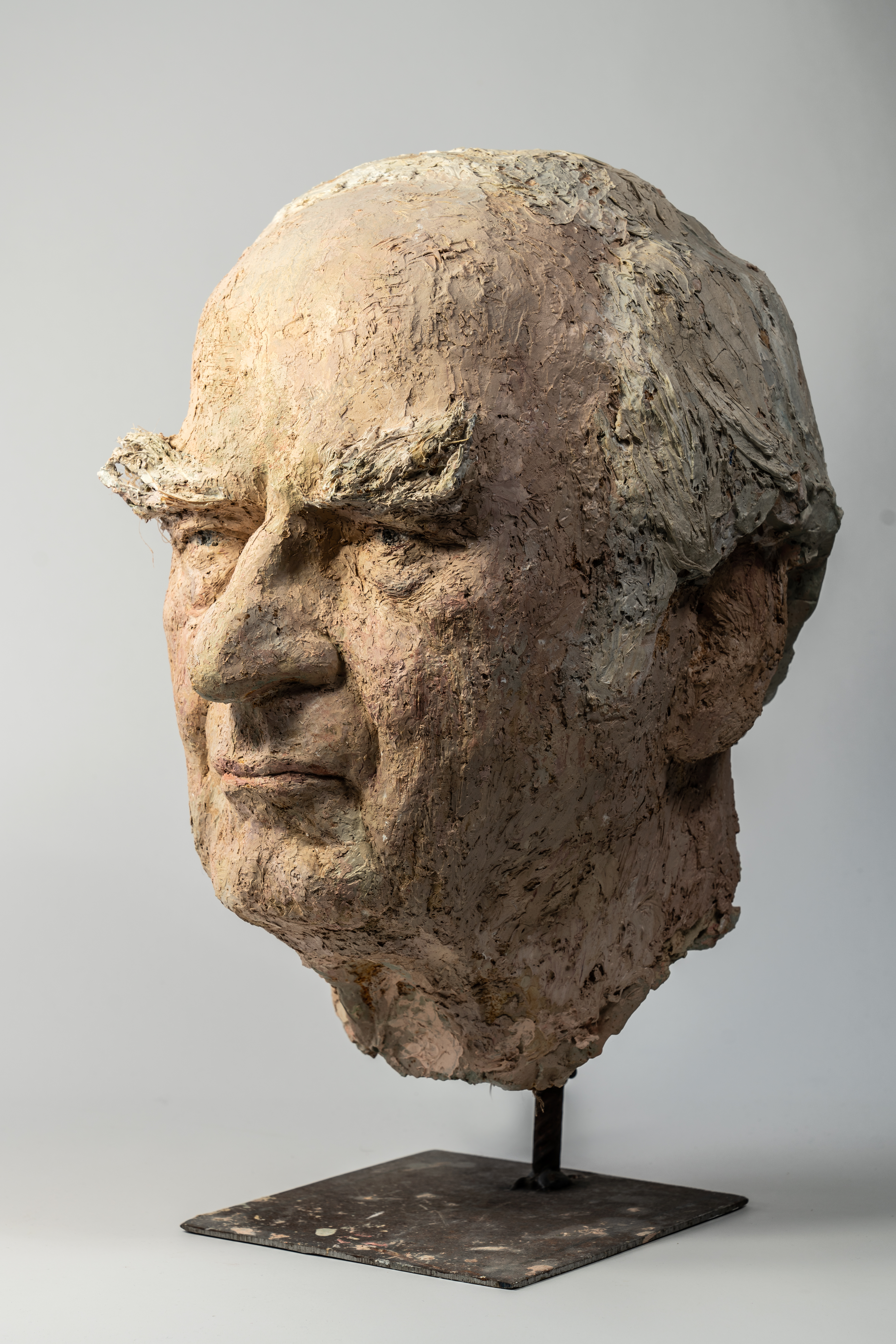
Portrait sculpture, 2006

Walser's books were published by Suhrkamp Verlag, Frankfurt, until 2003. The publisher printed an edition of his works in 12 volumes in 1997. Beginning in 2004, Walser's works were published by Rowohlt, Reinbek. His works include:

- Beschreibung einer Form: Versuch über die epische Dichtung Franz Kafkas, dissertation (1951)
- Ein Flugzeug über dem Haus und andere Geschichten, story collection (1955), ISBN 3-518-39288-3
- Ehen in Philippsburg, novel (1957) ISBN 978-3-499-10557-9 – The Gadarene Club (1960) OL 5831047M / Marriage in Philippsburg (1961) OL 18912147M
- Halbzeit, novel (1960) ISBN 3-518-04623-3, first part of the Anselm Kristlein trilogy
- Eiche und Angora, play (1962) – The Rabbit Race (1963) – adapted by Ronald Duncan OL 7798978M, ISBN 978-0-7145-0497-1
- Der Schwarze Schwan, play (1964) OL 13727777M
- Überlebensgroß Herr Krott: Requiem für einen Unsterblichen (1964) ISBN 3-518-00055-1
- Lügengeschichten, story collection (1964) ISBN 3-518-38236-5
- Erfahrungen und Leseerfahrungen (1965) OL 5579897M
- Das Einhorn, novel (1966) ISBN 3-518-06659-5, second part of the Anselm Kristlein trilogy – The Unicorn (1971) OL 5279092M ISBN 0-7145-0886-1
- Der Abstecher, Die Zimmerschlacht, two plays (1967) OL 17172133M Der Abstecher translated as – The Detour – by Richard Grunberger
- Heimatkunde: Aufsätze und Reden, essays and speeches (1968)
- Ein Kinderspiel, play in two acts (1970) ISBN 3-518-00400-X
- Fiction, story (1970) OL 4985520M
- Aus dem Wortschatz unserer Kämpfe (1971) ISBN 3-87365-009-6
- Die Gallistl'sche Krankheit, novel (1972) ISBN 3-518-04626-8
- Der Sturz (1973) ISBN 3-518-04627-6, third part of the Anselm Kristlein trilogy
- Das Sauspiel: Szenen aus dem 16. Jahrhundert (1975) ISBN 3-518-04628-4
- Jenseits der Liebe, novel (1976) ISBN 3-518-04619-5 – Beyond All Love (1983) ISBN 978-0-7145-3917-1
- Ein fliehendes Pferd (1978) – Runaway Horse: A Novel (1987) OL 7931429M ISBN 978-0-8050-0359-8
- Seelenarbeit, novel (1979) ISBN 3-518-37401-X – The Inner Man (1984) OL 9226852M
- Das Schwanenhaus, novel (1980) ISBN 3-518-37300-5 – The Swan Villa (1983) OL 4267409M
- Selbstbewußtsein und Ironie, Frankfurt lectures (1981) ISBN 3-518-11090-X
- Brief an Lord Liszt, novel (1982) ISBN 3-518-04632-2 – Letter to Lord Liszt (1985) OL 3020691M
- In Goethes Hand: Szenen aus dem 19. Jahrhundert (1982) ISBN 3-518-04629-2
- Liebeserklärungen (1983) ISBN 3-518-04521-0
- Brandung, novel (1985) ISBN 3-518-03570-3 – Breakers: A Novel (1987) ISBN 978-0-8050-0415-1
- Meßmers Gedanken (1985) ISBN 3-518-03222-4
- Geständnis auf Raten (1986) ISBN 3-518-11374-7
- Die Amerikareise: Versuch, ein Gefühl zu verstehen (with André Ficus, Kunstverlag Weingarten, 1986) ISBN 3-458-32943-9
- Dorle und Wolf, novella (1987) ISBN 3-518-02668-2 – No Man's Land (1988) ISBN 978-0-8050-0667-4
- Jagd, novel (1988) ISBN 3-518-40130-0
- Über Deutschland reden (1988) ISBN 3-518-11553-7
- Die Verteidigung der Kindheit, novel (1991) ISBN 3-518-40380-X
- Das Sofa (written 1961, published 1992) ISBN 3-518-40458-X
- Ohne einander, novel (1993) ISBN 3-518-40542-X
- Vormittag eines Schriftstellers (1994) ISBN 3-518-40603-5
- Kaschmir in Parching: Szenen aus der Gegenwart (1995) ISBN 3-518-40740-6
- Finks Krieg, novel (1996) ISBN 3-518-40791-0
- Deutsche Sorgen (1997) ISBN 3-518-39158-5
- Heimatlob: Ein Bodensee-Buch, illustrated book about Lake Constance (with Ficus, Insel Verlag, 1998) ISBN 3-458-34074-2
- Ein springender Brunnen, novel (1998) ISBN 3-518-41010-5 – A Gushing Fountain (2015)
- Der Lebenslauf der Liebe, novel (2000) ISBN 3-518-41270-1
- Tod eines Kritikers, novel (2002) ISBN 3-518-41378-3
- Meßmers Reisen (2003) ISBN 3-518-41463-1
- Der Augenblick der Liebe, novel (2004) ISBN 3-498-07353-2
- Die Verwaltung des Nichts, essays (2004) ISBN 3-498-07354-0
- Leben und Schreiben: Tagebücher 1951–1962, diaries (2005) ISBN 978-3-499-24427-8
- Angstblüte, novel (2006) ISBN 3-498-07357-5
- Der Lebensroman des Andreas Beck, novel about Andreas Beck (Edition Isele, Eggingen, 2006) ISBN 3-86142-401-0
- Das geschundene Tier, 39 ballads (2007) ISBN 978-3-498-07359-6.
- The Burden of the Past: Martin Walser on Modern German Identity (in English, 2008), ISBN 978-1-57113-789-0, JSTOR 10.7722/j.ctt82047
- Ein liebender Mann, novel about the aging Goethe (2008) ISBN 978-3-498-07363-3 – A Man in Love
- Leben und Schreiben. Tagebücher 1963–1973, diaries (2008) ISBN 978-3-498-07358-9.
- Mein Jenseits, novella (Berlin University Press, 2010) ISBN 978-3-940432-77-3.
- Leben und Schreiben. Tagebücher 1974–1978, diaries (2010) ISBN 978-3-498-07369-5
- Muttersohn novel (2011) ISBN 978-3-498-07378-7
- Meine Lebensreisen (Corso, Hamburg, 2012) ISBN 978-3-86260-045-8
- Über Rechtfertigung, eine Versuchung: Zeugen und Zeugnisse (2012) ISBN 978-3-498-07381-7
- Das dreizehnte Kapitel (2012) ISBN 978-3-498-07382-4
- Meßmers Momente (2013) ISBN 978-3-498-07383-1
- Die Inszenierung (2013) ISBN 978-3-498-07384-8
- Shmekendike blumen. Ein Denkmal / A dermonung für Sholem Yankev Abramovitsh. (2014) ISBN 978-3-498-07387-9
- Schreiben und Leben. Tagebücher 1979–1981, diaries (2014) ISBN 978-3-498-07386-2
- Ein sterbender Mann (2016) ISBN 978-3-498-07388-6
- Statt etwas, oder Der letzte Rank (2017) ISBN 978-3-498-07392-3
- Ewig aktuell : aus gegebenem Anlass. (2017) ISBN 978-3-498-07393-0
- with Jakob Augstein: Das Leben wortwörtlich. Ein Gespräch., conversation (2017) ISBN 978-3-498-00680-8
- Gar alles oder Briefe an eine unbekannte Geliebte. (2018) ISBN 978-3-498-07400-5
- Spätdienst. Bekenntnis und Stimmung, with illustrations by Alissa Walser (2018) ISBN 978-3-498-07407-4
- Mädchenleben oder Die Heiligsprechung. Legende. (2019) ISBN 978-3-498-00196-4
- Sprachlaub oder: Wahr ist, was schön ist (2021) ISBN 978-3-498-00239-8
- Das Traumbuch. Postkarten aus dem Schlaf, with Cornelia Schleime (2022) ISBN 978-3-498-00319-7

=== Film scripts ===
- Chiarevalle wird entdeckt, directed by Hannes Tannert (1963, TV film)
- Das Unheil (Havoc), directed by Peter Fleischmann (1972)
- Weak Spot, directed by Peter Fleischmann (1975)
- Tatort: Armer Nanosh, 1989 episode directed by Stanislav Barabáš
- Tassilo, directed by Hajo Gies (1991, TV series, 6 episodes)

=== Films of Walser's novels and plays ===
- Der Abstecher, directed by Günter Gräwert (1962, TV film, based on the play of the same name)
- Eiche und Angora, directed by Rainer Wolffhardt (1964, TV film, based on the play of the same name)
- Eiche und Angora, directed by Helmut Schiemann (East Germany, 1965, TV film, based on the play of the same name)
- Die Zimmerschlacht, directed by Franz Peter Wirth (1969, TV film, based on the play of the same name)
- Überlebensgroß Herr Krott, directed by Martin Batty and Karl Vibach (1971, TV film, based on the play of the same name)
- Das Einhorn, directed by Peter Patzak (1978, based on the novel of the same name)
- Der Sturz, directed by Alf Brustellin (1979, based on the novel of the same name)
- Ein fliehendes Pferd, directed by Peter Beauvais (1986, TV film, based on the novella of the same name)
- Alles aus Liebe: Säntis, directed by Rainer Boldt (1986, TV series episode, based on the story Säntis)
- Ohne einander, directed by Diethard Klante (2007, TV film, based on the novel of the same name)
- Ein fliehendes Pferd, directed by Rainer Kaufmann (2007, based on the novella of the same name)
