= Aglaia =

Aglaia, Aglaea, Aglaïa, Aglaja, or Aglaya (Ἀγλαΐα) is an ancient Greek female name and may refer to:

== People and mythical figures ==
- Aglaia or Aglaea (mythology)
  - Aglaia (Grace), one of the Charites in Greek mythology
- Saint Aglaia of Rome, 4th century, a companion of Saint Boniface of Tarsus

== Science ==
- Aglaia (plant), a genus of trees in the mahogany family
- Drosophila aglaia, an endangered species of fly from Hawaii
- The butterfly genus Aglais (Dalman, 1816)
- 47 Aglaja, an asteroid

== Theatre ==
- Aglaia, a ballet by Filippo Taglioni.
- Aglaia, an opera by Heitor Villa-Lobos

== Other uses ==
- Aglaia (given name)
- HMS Aglaia, an 18th-century British ship
- Aglaea, a fictional character from the video game Honkai Star Rail.

== See also ==
- Aglaja (disambiguation)
- Aglae (disambiguation)
