= Aglaja =

Aglaja may refer to:

- An alternative form of Aglaia (given name)
  - Aglaja Brix (born 1990), German actress
  - Aglaja Orgeni (1841–1926), Hungarian opera singer
  - Aglaya, a character in Dostoyevski's novel The Idiot
- Aglaja, 1893 opera by Leo Blech
- Aglaja (dance company), from Bruges, Belgium
- Aglaja (gastropod), a genus of sea slugs
- 47 Aglaja, a large main belt asteroid
