= The Reader =

1995 novel by Bernhard Schlink

- Author: Bernhard Schlink
- Original title: Der Vorleser
- Translator: Carol Brown Janeway
- Cover artist: Kathleen DiGrado (design), Sean Kernan (photo)
- Language: German
- Genre: Novel
- Publisher: Vintage International
- Publication date: 1995
- Publication place: Germany
- Pages: 218 pp
- ISBN: 0-375-70797-2
- OCLC: 370051270

The Reader (German: Der Vorleser) is a novel by German law professor and judge Bernhard Schlink, published in 1995. The story is a parable dealing with the difficulties post-war German generations have had comprehending the Holocaust; Ruth Franklin writes that it was aimed specifically at the generation Bertolt Brecht called the Nachgeborenen (those who came after). Like other novels in the genre of Vergangenheitsbewältigung (the struggle to come to terms with the past), The Reader explores how the post-war generations should approach the generation that took part in, or witnessed, the atrocities. These are the questions at the heart of Holocaust literature in the late 20th and early 21st century, as the victims and witnesses died and living memory was fading.

Schlink's book was well received in his native country and elsewhere, winning several awards; Der Spiegel wrote that it was one of the greatest triumphs of German literature since Günter Grass's The Tin Drum (1959). It sold 500,000 copies in Germany and was listed 14th of the 100 favorite books of German readers in a television poll in 2007. It won the German Hans Fallada Prize in 1998, and became the first German book to top The New York Times bestselling books list. It has been translated into 45 different languages, and has been included in the curricula of college-level courses in Holocaust literature and German language and German literature.

The Reader was adapted by David Hare into the 2008 film of the same name directed by Stephen Daldry; the film was nominated for five Academy Awards, with Kate Winslet winning for her portrayal of Hanna Schmitz.

== Synopsis ==
=== Characters ===
- Michael Berg, a German man who is first portrayed as a 15-year-old boy and is revisited at later parts of his life; notably, when he is a researcher in legal history, divorced with one daughter, Julia. Like many of his generation, he struggles to come to terms with his country's recent history.
- Hanna Schmitz, a former guard at Auschwitz. She is 36, illiterate and working as a tram conductor in Neustadt when she first meets 15-year-old Michael. She takes a dominant position in their relationship.
- Sophie, a friend of Michael's when he is in school, and on whom he probably has a crush. She is almost the first person whom he tells about Hanna. When he begins his friendship with her, he begins to "betray" Hanna by denying her relationship with him and by cutting short his time with Hanna to be with Sophie and his other friends.
- Michael's father, a philosophy professor who specializes in Kant and Hegel. During the Nazi era he lost his job for giving a lecture on Spinoza and had to support himself and his family by writing hiking guidebooks. He is very formal and requires his children to make appointments to see him. He is emotionally stiff and does not easily express his emotions to Michael or his three siblings, which exacerbates the difficulties Hanna creates for Michael. By the time Michael is narrating the story, his father is dead.
- Michael's mother, seen briefly. Michael has fond memories of her pampering him as a child, which his relationship with Hanna reawakens. A psychoanalyst tells him he should consider his mother's effect on him more, since she barely figures in his retelling of his life.
- Jewish woman, who wrote about surviving the death march from Auschwitz. She lives in New York City when Michael visits her near the end of the story, still suffering from the loss of her own family.

=== Part 1 ===
The story is told in three parts by the main character, Michael Berg. Each part takes place in a different time period in the past. Part I begins in a West German city in 1958. After 15-year-old Michael becomes ill on his way home, 36-year-old tram conductor Hanna Schmitz notices him, cleans him up, and sees him safely home. He spends the next three months absent from school battling hepatitis He visits Hanna to thank her for her help and realizes he is attracted to her. Embarrassed after she catches him watching her getting dressed, he runs away, but he returns days later. After she asks him to retrieve coal from her cellar, he is covered in coal dust; she watches him bathe and seduces him. He returns eagerly to her apartment on a regular basis, and they begin a heated affair. They develop a practice of bathing and having sex, before which she frequently has him read aloud to her, especially classical literature, such as The Odyssey and Chekhov's The Lady with the Dog. Both remain somewhat distant from each other emotionally, despite their physical closeness. Hanna is at times physically and verbally abusive to Michael. Months into the relationship, she suddenly leaves without a trace. The distance between them had been growing as Michael had been spending more time with his school friends; he feels guilty and believes it was something he did that caused her departure. The memory of her taints all his other relationships with women.

=== Part 2 ===
Six years later, while attending law school, Michael is part of a group of students observing a war crimes trial. A group of middle-aged women who had served as SS guards at a satellite of Auschwitz in occupied Poland are being tried for allowing 300 Jewish women under their ostensible "protection" to die in a fire locked in a church that had been bombed during the evacuation of the camp. The incident was chronicled in a book written by one of the few survivors, who emigrated to the United States after the war; she is the main prosecution witness at the trial.

Michael is stunned to see that Hanna is one of the defendants, sending him on a roller coaster of complex emotions. He feels guilty for having loved a remorseless criminal and at the same time is mystified at Hanna's willingness to accept full responsibility for supervising the other guards despite evidence proving otherwise. She is accused of writing the account of the fire.

At first she denies this, then in a panic admits it in order not to have to provide a sample of her handwriting. Michael, horrified, realizes then that Hanna has a secret that she refuses to reveal at any cost—that she is illiterate. This explains many of Hanna's actions: her refusal of the promotion that would have removed her from the responsibility of supervising these women and also the fear she carried her entire life of being discovered.

During the trial, it transpires that she took in the weak, sickly women and had them read to her before they were sent to the gas chambers. Michael is uncertain if she wanted to make their last days bearable or if she sent them to their death so they would not reveal her secret.

After much deliberation and having consulted his father, who advised that he only reveal her secret if he spoke to her first, he chooses not to tell the judge of Hanna's illiteracy. She is convicted and sentenced to life in prison while the other women receive only minor sentences.

=== Part 3 ===
Years have passed, Michael is divorced and has a daughter. He is trying to come to terms with his feelings for Hanna and begins taping readings of books and sending them to her without any correspondence while she is in prison. Hanna begins to teach herself to read, and then write in a childlike way, by borrowing the books from the prison library and following the tapes along in the text. She writes to Michael, but he cannot bring himself to reply. After 18 years, Hanna is about to be released, so he agrees (after hesitation) to find her a place to stay and employment, visiting her in prison. On the day of her release in 1983, she commits suicide, and Michael is heartbroken. Michael learns from the warden that she had been reading books by many prominent Holocaust survivors, such as Elie Wiesel, Primo Levi, Tadeusz Borowski, and histories of the camps. The warden, in her anger towards Michael for communicating with Hanna only by audio tapes, expresses Hanna's disappointment. Hanna left him an assignment: give all her money to the survivor of the church fire.

While in the U.S., Michael travels to New York to visit the Jewish woman who was a witness at the trial, and who wrote the book about the winter death march from Auschwitz. She can see his terrible conflict of emotions and he finally tells of his youthful relationship with Hanna. The unspoken damage she left to the people around her hangs in the air. He describes his short, cold marriage, and his distant relationship with his daughter. The woman understands, but nonetheless refuses to take the savings Hanna had asked Michael to convey to her, saying, "Using it for something to do with the Holocaust would really seem like an absolution to me, and that is something I neither wish nor care to grant." She asks that he donate it as he sees fit; he chooses a Jewish charity for combating illiteracy, in Hanna's name. Having had a caddy stolen from her when she was a child in the camp, the woman does take the old tea caddy in which Hanna had kept her money and mementos. Returning to Germany, and with a letter of thanks for the donation made in Hanna's name, Michael visits Hanna's grave after 10 years for the first and only time.

== Literary elements ==
=== Style ===
Schlink's tone is sparse; he writes with an "icy clarity that simultaneously reveals and conceals," as Ruth Franklin puts it, a style exemplified by the bluntness of chapter openings at key turns in the plot, such as the first sentence of chapter seven: "The next night I fell in love with her." His "clear and unadorned language enhances the authenticity of the text," according to S. Lillian Kremer, and the short chapters and streamlined plot recall detective novels and increase the realism. Schlink's main theme is how his generation, and indeed all generations after the Third Reich, have struggled to come to terms with the crimes of the Nazis: "the past which brands us and with which we must live." For his cohorts, there was the unique position of being blameless and the sense of duty to call to account their parents' generation:

… [which] had been served by the guards and enforcers, or had done nothing to stop them, or had not banished them from their midst as it could have done after 1945, was in the dock, and we explored it, subjected it to trial by daylight, and condemned it to shame … We all condemned our parents to shame, even if the only charge we could bring was that after 1945 they had tolerated the perpetrators in their midst … The more horrible the events about which we read and heard, the more certain we became of our responsibility to enlighten and accuse.

But while he would like it to be as simple as that, his experience with Hanna complicates matters:

I wanted simultaneously to understand Hanna's crime and to condemn it. But it was too terrible for that. When I tried to understand it, I had the feeling I was failing to condemn it as it must be condemned. When I condemned it as it must be condemned, there was no room for understanding. But even as I wanted to understand Hanna, failing to understand her meant betraying her all over again. I could not resolve this. I wanted to pose myself both tasks—understanding and condemnation. But it was impossible to do both.

Hanna and Michael's asymmetrical relationship enacts, in microcosm, the pas de deux of older and younger Germans in the postwar years: Michael concludes that "the pain I went through because of my love for Hanna was, in a way, the fate of my generation, a German fate." This idea plays itself out in the scene where the student Michael hitchhikes to the Natzweiler-Struthof concentration camp site during the trial, to get what he hopes will be some sense of the place. The driver who picks him up is an older man who questions him closely about what he believes motivated those who carried out the killings, then offers an answer of his own:

An executioner is not under orders. He's doing his work, he doesn't hate the people he executes, he's not taking revenge on them, he's not killing them because they're in his way or threatening or attacking them. They're a matter of such indifference to him that he can kill them as easily as not.

After the man tells an anecdote about a photograph of Jews being shot in Russia, one that he supposedly saw, but which showed an unusual level of insight into what a Nazi officer might have been thinking, Michael suspects him of being that officer and confronts him. The man stops the car and asks him to leave.

=== Metaphor ===
Germany had the highest literacy rate in Europe; Franklin suggests that Hanna's illiteracy represented the ignorance that allowed ordinary people to commit atrocities. Nicholas Wroe, in The Guardian, likewise writes of the relationship between Hanna's illiteracy and the Third Reich's "moral illiteracy," and Ron Rosenbaum of Slate says that Hanna is "a stand-in for the German people and their supposed inability to 'read' the signs that mass murder was being done in their name, by their fellow citizens."

Michael's relationship with Hanna, partly erotic and partly maternal, stands for the ambivalent relationship of present-day Germany and its Nazi past: the past is "mother" of Michael's generation, and he eventually finds out, like other Germans of his generation, that his "parents" were guilty. "The paralyzing shame, the psychic numbing, the moral failures of the 'lucky late-born' are the novel's central focus," writes Suzanne Ruta in The New York Times. Only through his relationship with Hanna can Michael get well; Franklin interprets that to mean that "postwar Germany is sick, and it can begin to heal only through its encounter with the Nazi past." Richard Bernstein of the New York Times also notes that "In some sense, perhaps, Hanna can be seen to stand in for the larger German quandary of remembrance and atonement," but prefers not to read the novel as an allegory.

That said, the novel is about Michael, not Hanna; the original German title, Der Vorleser, specifically indicates one who reads aloud, as Michael does for Hanna.

The Reader abounds with references to representations of the Holocaust, both external and internal to Michael's narrative, some real and some invented by Schlink. Of the latter, the most important is the book by the death-march survivor that constitutes the basis of the case against Hanna. It is summarized at some length and even briefly quoted, although its title is never given. Michael must read it in English since its German translation has not yet been published: "(It was) an unfamiliar and laborious exercise at the time. And as always, the alien language, unmastered and struggled over, created a strange concatenation of distance and immediacy." On a second reading in later life, he says, "it is the book that creates distance." For Michael, written media alone cannot convey a full impression of the Holocaust: the victims are not sympathetic, and the oppressors are too faceless to be judged. He cannot muster up the empathy to "make the experience part of his internal life," according to Froma Zeitlin. Hanna, however, has the opposite experience upon reading books by Holocaust survivors. She tells Michael:

I always had the feeling that no one understood me anyway, that no one knew who I was and what made me do this or that. And you know, when no one understands you, no one can call you to account. Not even the court could call me to account. But the dead can. They understand. They don't even have to have been there, but if they do, they understand even better. Here in prison they were with me a lot. They came every night, whether I wanted them to or not. Before the trial I could still chase them away when they wanted to come.

When she asks the judge at her trial, "What would you have done?" about whether she should have left her job at Siemens and taken the guard position, her question indicates that she does not know that she could have acted differently, and her statement that there was "no alternative" claims a lack of moral responsibility. As a result of her shame at being illiterate, she has not only let the bulk of the crime be pinned on her, she has let those with a greater share of responsibility escape full accountability. Franklin writes that this is the moral center of the novel—that Hanna, as Michael puts it, chooses exposure as a criminal over exposure as an illiterate—and in Franklin's view the novel cannot recover from the weakness of this position. Franklin regards it not only as implausible, but the implication that Hanna chose the job and acted as she did because of her illiteracy appears intended to exonerate her. Her Nazism was accidental, and Franklin writes that Schlink offers no guidance about how to punish a brutality of convenience, rather than of ideology.

Michael is aware that all his attempts to visualize what Hanna might have been like back then, what happened, are colored by what he has read and seen in movies. He feels a difficult identification with the victims when he learns that Hanna often picked one prisoner to read to her, as she chose him later on, only to send that girl to Auschwitz and the gas chamber after several months. Did she do it to make the last months of the condemned more bearable, or to keep her secret safe? Michael's inability to both condemn and understand springs from this. He asks himself and the reader:

What should our second generation have done, what should it do with the knowledge of the horrors of the extermination of the Jews? We should not believe we can comprehend the incomprehensible, we may not compare the incomparable, we may not inquire because to make the horrors an object of inquiry is to make the horrors an object of discussion, even if the horrors themselves are not questioned, instead of accepting them as something in the face of which we can only fall silent in revulsion, shame and guilt. Should we only fall silent in revulsion, shame and guilt? To what purpose?

=== Intertextuality ===
The books read in the novel, both by Michael to Hanna and by Hanna herself, are significant. Michael selects texts from the Enlightenment, "with its emphasis on moral and ethical absolutes," and German classics by which means he tries to reclaim German heritage. The texts include Friedrich Schiller's Intrigue and Love and Gotthold Lessing's Emilia Galotti.

Katharina Hall writes that the novel itself relies on intertextual knowledge: it "reworks the ‘Väterliteratur’ model of the 1970s and 1980s," which depicts the relationship between the first and second generations; here, however, the relationship is sexual rather than parent-child. She also notes the invoking of tropes present in mass-market romance fiction, though the gender roles are inverted.

== Themes ==
=== Memory and history ===
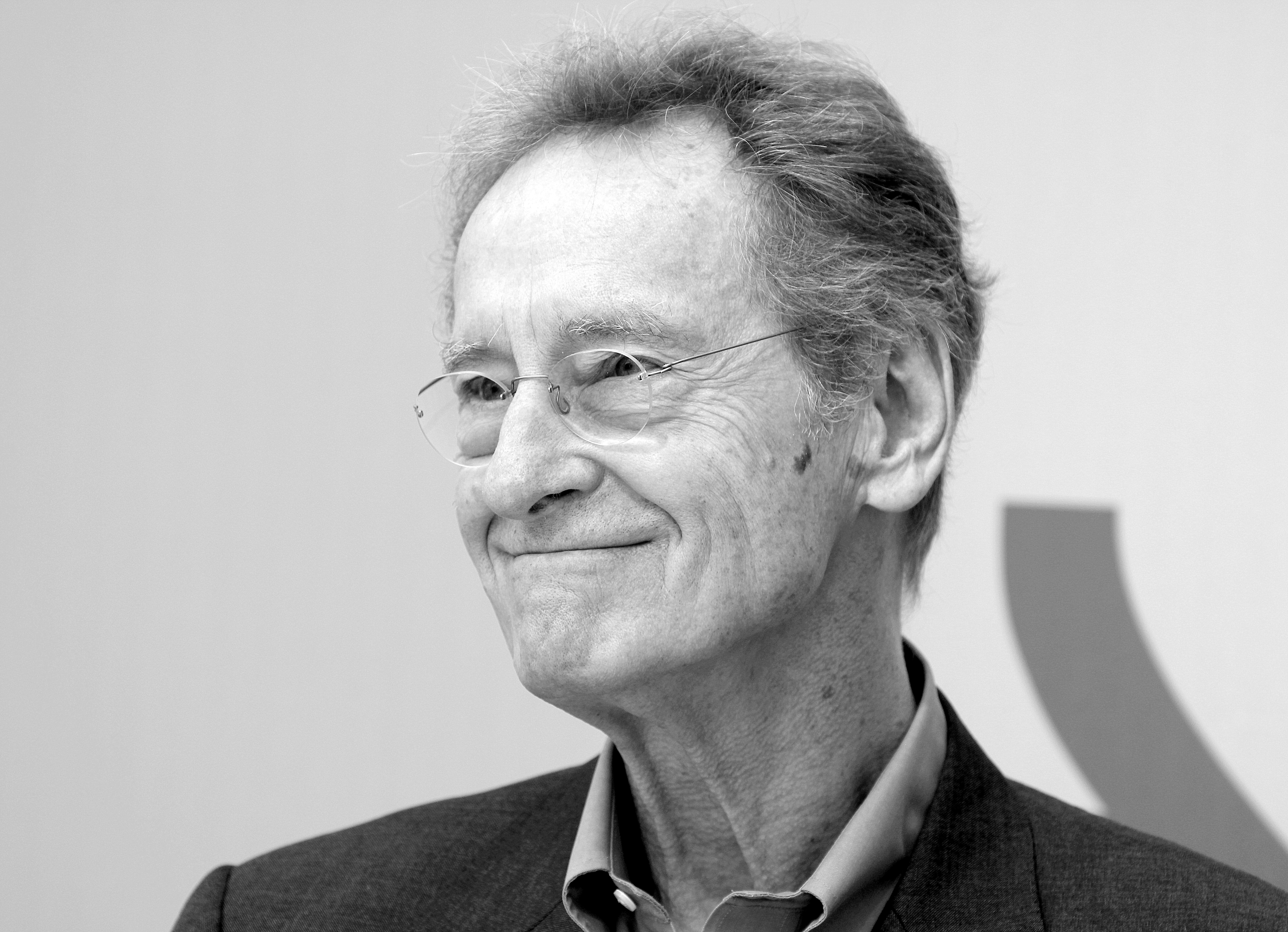
Photograph of The Reader author, Bernhard Schlink. Taken in March 2018.

The Reader takes readers back into history through the lens of young man who falls in love with the mystery of an older woman. The setting of this love story takes places in postwar Germany, specifically the 1960s, right when children started asking, "Daddy, what'd you do in the war?". An era compiled with many different memories and perspective that were absorbed into what one refers to as history. Through the study of history and memory comparison the German term, "Vergangenheitsbewältigung (VGB)", has emerged in literary publishings and is defined as "overcoming the past". The protagonist, Michael Berg, is faced with the predicament where it comes to light that the woman he once loved had an intimate role in the horrid actions of the Holocaust and struggles with his post memory. Questioning morality, comparability, silence, guilt, and shame; the author writes,

At the same time I ask myself, as I had already begun to ask myself back then: What should our second generation have done, what should I do with the knowledge of the horrors of the extermination of the Jews? We should not believe we can comprehend the incomprehensible, we may not compare the incomparable, we may not inquire because to inquire is to make the horrors an object of discussion, even if the horrors themselves are not questioned, instead of accepting them as something the face of which we can only fall silent in revulsion, shame and guilt. Should we only fall silent in revulsion, shame, and guilt? To what purpose?

Schlink puts readers into Michael's shoes and questions influence memories hold in the remembrance of history. Reflecting upon the responsibilities of the next generation and their interpretation of how things should be remembered and memorialized. An additional form of historical remembrance is the Lieux de mémoire project. A concept that considers the study of remembrance either through memorials and monuments or cities, symbols, and novels like this one and considers their effect on how history is viewed today.

== Reception ==
The Reader sold 500,000 copies in Germany. It received several literary awards and many favorable reviews. In 2004, when the television network ZDF published a list of the 100 favorite books of German readers, it was 14th, the second-highest ranking for any contemporary German novel on the list. Critic Rainer Moritz of Die Welt wrote that it took "the artistic contrast between private and public to the absurd." Werner Fuld wrote in Focus that "one must not let great themes roll away, when one can truly write about them." In 1998 The Reader was awarded the Hans Fallada Prize, a German literary award.

As of 2002 the novel had been translated into 25 languages. Writing in The New York Times, Richard Bernstein called it "arresting, philosophically elegant, (and) morally complex." While finding the ending too abrupt, Suzanne Ruta said in the New York Times Book Review that "daring fusion of 19th-century post-romantic, post-fairy-tale models with the awful history of the 20th century makes for a moving, suggestive and ultimately hopeful work." It went on to sell two million copies in the United States (many of them after it was featured in Oprah's Book Club in 1999) 200,000 copies in the UK, 100,000 in France, and in South Africa it was awarded the 1999 Boeke Prize.

=== Criticism ===
Schlink's approach toward Hanna's culpability in the Final Solution has been a frequent complaint about the book. Early on he was accused of revising or falsifying history. In the Süddeutsche Zeitung, Jeremy Adler accused him of "cultural pornography" and said the novel simplifies history and compels its readers to identify with the perpetrators. In the English-speaking world, Frederic Raphael wrote that no one could recommend the book "without having a tin ear for fiction and a blind eye for evil." Ron Rosenbaum, criticizing the film adaptation of The Reader, wrote that even if Germans like Hanna were metaphorically "illiterate", "they could have heard it from Hitler's mouth in his infamous 1939 radio broadcast to Germany and the world, threatening extermination of the Jews if war started. You had to be deaf, dumb, and blind, not merely illiterate… You'd have to be exceedingly stupid." (This refers to the January 30, 1939 statement to the Reichstag, later deliberately misdated to 1 September 1939)

Cynthia Ozick, in Commentary, called it a "product, conscious or not, of a desire to divert (attention) from the culpability of a normally educated population in a nation famed for Kultur." Ozick's reading of the novel was challenged by Richard H. Weisberg, who highlighted a passage in the novel where Hanna strikes Michael repeatedly with a leather strap drawing blood and splitting his lip. In Weisberg's view, Schlink has Hanna revert to concentration-camp mode, the split lip reminding us of the bloodletting of millions. Jeffrey I. Roth replied that Ozick had misread the novel, confusing the perspective of the immature and impressionable narrator, Michael Berg, who loves Hanna and cannot condemn her entirely, with the point of view of the author, Bernhard Schlink, who writes of Hanna, "That woman was truly brutal." Roth found in Hanna an unsympathetic character who behaves brutally and never fully accepts her criminal responsibility, making Ozick's suggestion, that Schlink wants us to sympathize with Hanna and by extension her Nazi cohorts, implausible.

As critics of The Reader argued increasingly on historical grounds, pointing out that everybody in Germany could and should have known about Hitler's intentions towards the Jews, there has not been a great deal of discussion about the character "Hanna" having been born not in Germany proper, but in the City of Hermannstadt (modern-day Sibiu), a long-standing centre of German culture in Transylvania, Romania. The first study on the reasons Germans from Transylvania entered the SS painted a complex picture. It appeared only in 2007, 12 years after the novel was published; in general, discussions on The Reader have solidly placed Hanna in the context of Germany.

Schlink wrote that "in Israel and New York the older generation liked the book," but those of his own generation were more likely to criticize Michael (and his) inability to fully condemn Hanna. He added, "I've heard that criticism several times but never from the older generation, people who have lived through it."

== Film adaptation ==
The film version, adapted by David Hare and directed by Stephen Daldry, was released in December 2008. Kate Winslet played Hanna, with David Kross as the young Michael and Ralph Fiennes as the older man. Bruno Ganz and Lena Olin played supporting roles. It was nominated for five Academy Awards including Best Picture. Winslet won the Oscar for Best Actress.
