= Vijessna Ferkic =

German-American actress (born 1987)

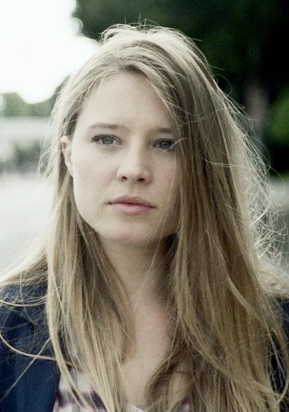
- Ferkic, Los Angeles 2011
- Born: 28 April 1987 (age 39) near Hamburg, West Germany
- Occupations: Actress, Visual Artist, Writer

Vijessna Ferkic (born 28 April 1987, near Hamburg, West Germany) is a German-American actress, visual artist and writer.

== Biography ==
Ferkic was born and raised in a small town near Hamburg.

At the age of 10, she was accepted into one of the first acting schools in Hamburg. Shortly after that, Ferkic was chosen to star in the series Die Pfefferkörner (1998-2001). Ferkic subsequently had several guest roles on established television series and movie productions. Ferkic was chosen to play Sophie in The Reader directed by Stephen Daldry as well as Sarah in Beats Being Dead by Christian Petzold.

== Filmography and television ==
Year	Title	Role	Notes
2019	Die Pfefferkörner	Natascha	ep.: 200
2018	Rosamunde Pilcher: Nanny verzweifelt gesucht	Kristin Myers	Director Heidi Kranz
2017	Shooter	Helga	ep.: The Hunting Party
2014	Heiter bis tödlich: Morden im Norden	Anne Seel	ep.: Der Nackte und der Tote
2012	Victor and the Secret of Crocodile Mansion	Louise	Based on the novel by Helmut Ballot
2012	Heiter bis Tödlich – Fuchs und Gans	Babs	ep.: Feuer und Flamme
2010	Dreileben – Beats Being Dead (Dreileben – Etwas Besseres als den Tod)	Sarah	Director Christian Petzold
2010	Countdown – Die Jagd beginnt	Katherina	ep.: Vergeltung
2010	Der Staatsanwalt	Nina Sonders	ep.: Tödlicher Pakt
2009	Bella Block	Inken Andersson	ep.: Das schwarze Zimmer
2009	Alarm für Cobra 11	Julia	ep.: Geliebter Feind
2009	Gonger II	Lilly	
2008	The Reader	Sophie	Based on the novel by Bernhard Schlink
2007	Our Charly	Elli Hassel	
2007	Die Pfefferkörner	Natascha	ep.: 53
2006	Ohne Einander	Sylvi	Based on the novel by Martin Walser
2006	Das Duo	Lisa Ottrop	ep.: Der Sumpf
2006	Wilsberg	Rebecca	ep.: Miss-Wahl
2006–2008	Krimi.de	Trainee police officer Natascha	(Season 1–5)
2005–2006	Pirate Vacation	Insa Gehrke	
2004	Alpha Team	Britney Thiessen	
2003	Solo für Schwarz - Tod im See	young Hannah	
1998–2001	Die Pfefferkörner	Natascha	(Season 1–3, 5); 2000 Golden Telix Award for Best Television Series; Asia Pacific Broadcasting Union: The ABU Prize for Children's Programmes; Prix Jeunesse: Nomination; 2001 and 2003; Golden Sparrow in the category Short Fiction
1999	Stahlnetz		ep.: Die Zeugin
