= Armond White =

American film and music critic

- Born: Armond Allen White; 1953 (age 72–73); Detroit, Michigan, U.S.
- Education: Wayne State University (BA); Columbia University (MFA)
- Occupation: Film critic

Armond Allen White (born 1953) is an American film and music critic who writes for National Review and Out. He was previously the editor of CityArts (2011–2014), the lead film critic for the alternative weekly New York Press (1997–2011), and the arts editor and critic for The City Sun (1984–1996). Other publications that have carried his work include Film Comment, Variety, The Nation, The New York Times, Slate, Columbia Journalism Review, and First Things.

White is known for his provocative, idiosyncratic, and often contrarian reviews, which have made him a controversial figure in film criticism. As an African-American, gay, conservative film critic, he has been called a "minority three times over in his profession."

== Early life ==
White was born in Detroit, the youngest of seven children. His family was the first African-American family to move to a primarily Jewish neighborhood on the city's northwest side, where he grew up. Raised Baptist, he later became Pentecostal, and identifies as "a believer."

White's interest in journalism and film criticism began as a student at Detroit's Central High School, when he first read the book Kiss Kiss Bang Bang by film critic Pauline Kael, whom he cites for "her willingness to go against the hype", along with Andrew Sarris, for his "sophisticated love of cinema", as major inspirations for his choice of career. White received a Bachelor of Arts in journalism at Wayne State University, followed by a Master of Fine Arts degree in film from Columbia University's School of the Arts in 1997.

== Career ==
White was the arts editor for The City Sun, where he wrote film, music and theater criticism, for the span of its publication from 1984 to 1996. He was hired by New York Press in 1997 and wrote for the paper until it ceased publication in August 2011. He then assumed the editorship of its sister publication CityArts starting in September.

White is a member of the National Society of Film Critics and New York Film Critics Online. He is a three-time chairman of the New York Film Critics Circle (1994, 2009 and 2010), has served as a member of the juries at the Sundance Film Festival, Tribeca Film Festival, and Mill Valley Film Festival, and was a member of several National Endowment for the Arts panels. He has taught classes on film at Columbia University and Long Island University.

In 1992, White was one of nine newspaper and magazine writers to win the ASCAP Deems Taylor Award for music criticism.

In January 2014, White was expelled from the New York Film Critics Circle for allegedly heckling director Steve McQueen at an event for the film 12 Years a Slave. White maintained his innocence, and called his expulsion a "smear campaign." The previous year, White had shouted protests at Michael Moore while Moore was delivering a speech, as White felt Moore had been unfairly maligning the Catholic Church. After White's expulsion, film critics Harlan Jacobson and Thelma Adams defended White, with the latter calling the move "Stalinist". White received an Anti-Censorship Award at the 35th annual American Book Awards for being "unfairly removed" from the critics' organization.

== Views on film ==
In 2013, Time Magazine wrote that White's reviews on Rotten Tomatoes agreed with the Tomatometer consensus just under 50% of the time.

White has called Intolerance the greatest film ever made, and has called A.I. Artificial Intelligence the best film of the 21st century. He has listed directors Steven Spielberg, Alain Resnais, Zack Snyder, Clint Eastwood, and S. Craig Zahler among his favorites.

A conservative, White often criticizes films with perceived left-wing messages, such as There Will Be Blood, Parasite, Don't Look Up, and Three Thousand Years of Longing, but he has praised the leftist director Jean-Luc Godard, writing that Godard's films "saw past political fashion". White is also critical of films that promote consumerism, arguing that Toy Story 3 does so, while citing Small Soldiers as a superior film featuring toys. He has said that when reviewing, he analyzes a film's political viewpoint, because "Ideology is everywhere ... [films are] made by people with feelings and ideas and agendas ... To me there's no such thing as just entertainment." Films that White has praised include Mom and Dad, Richard Jewell, Once Upon a Time in Hollywood, France, and Cry Macho.

White has provided extensive commentary on gay cinema, favorably reviewing I Now Pronounce You Chuck & Larry, God's Own Country, and Summer of 85, while unfavorably reviewing Brokeback Mountain and Bros.

White often analyzes and discusses race in cinema, having unfavorably reviewed Black films such as Precious, 12 Years a Slave, Get Out, Nope, Black Panther: Wakanda Forever, and Devotion. He has praised films such as Night of the Living Dead and Hi, Mom! for their depictions of racism, has cited Cyborg in Zack Snyder's Justice League as a positive example of a black superhero, and Miles Morales in Spider-Man: Into the Spider-Verse as a poor one.

White is generally critical of superhero movies, unfavorably reviewing The Dark Knight, Wonder Woman, Avengers: Endgame, and The Batman, while calling Marvel Cinematic Universe films "formulaic". He has praised Ghost Rider: Spirit of Vengeance, Watchmen, Man of Steel, Batman v Superman: Dawn of Justice, and Zack Snyder's Justice League; writing that Snyder "rescued comic-book movies from nihilism and juvenilia, making modern myths worthy of adult spirituality and politics".

White has attacked contemporary film criticism, awards shows, and film journalism. He derided the The Sight and Sound Greatest Films of All Time 2022 poll for selecting Jeanne Dielman, 23 quai du Commerce, 1080 Bruxelles as the greatest film of all time, calling it "a dull Marxist-feminist token" chosen for political reasons. He provided his own selections for the poll, which included À bout de souffle, Battleship Potemkin, Intolerance, Jules and Jim, L'Avventura, Lawrence of Arabia, Lola, The Magnificent Ambersons, Nashville, and The Passion of Joan of Arc.

=== Favorite films ===
In the 2012 Sight and Sound poll, White listed his ten favorite films:

- L'Avventura (Italy, 1960)
- Intolerance (US, 1916)
- Jules et Jim (France, 1962)
- Lawrence of Arabia (UK, 1962)
- Lola (France, 1961)
- The Magnificent Ambersons (US, 1942)
- Nashville (US, 1975)
- Nouvelle Vague (France, 1990)
- The Passion of Joan of Arc (Denmark, 1927)
- Sansho the Bailiff (Japan, 1954)

White made some comments about some of these, saying: "Movies don't change but we do. I did not see Sansho the Bailiff until recently and it had the same powerful effect on me as A.I. did ten years ago, so off with Spielberg to give Mizoguchi's masterwork its props. Godard's rarely screened Nouvelle Vague looms in my memory as his grandest work—grander and more important still due to cinephilia's recent decline."

== Personal life ==
White is gay and a Christian. According to the New York Times, he "lives by himself in Chelsea with no pets or plants, amid piles of DVDs. Standing 6-foot-3, he cuts an imposing figure. Yet in conversation, he comes across as exacting, quiet and polite, far different from what his writing—and seeming bad behavior—might suggest."

== Public reception ==
In his 2009 essay "Not in Defense of Armond White", Roger Ebert called White "an intelligent critic and a passionate writer" but also a "smart and knowing ... troll". White has in turn criticized Ebert, writing, "I do think it is fair to say that Roger Ebert destroyed film criticism. Because of the wide and far reach of television, he became an example of what a film critic does for too many people. And what he did simply was not criticism. It was simply blather."

In 2014, film critic Walter Biggins of RogerEbert.com wrote the essay "In Defense of Armond White", a reference to Ebert's earlier essay. Biggins criticizes White's combative style, but defends him as a critic, calling White "an important, distinctive, and ... necessary voice in film criticism". Biggins writes: "He's no troll, and he's one of the few critics capable of noting the inherent—and latent—racism of much of cinema and its discourse ... he has provided a rare black voice, and perhaps an even rarer conservative voice, to film/video commentary."

Time Magazine called White an "undeniably talented writer" who "developed a kind of notoriety for his rather contrarian opinions. Some of his colleagues have praised his against-the-grain approach to film criticism, while many others, including a broad swath he's publicly condemned, have been less kind".

White has responded to criticism of his reviews: "If there were a whole bunch of critics who I thought were doing a good job, then I would stop ... Because really, the reason why I do what I do is because I think there are things that need to be said about movies, about culture, about the world, that nobody's saying.

Critic Thelma Adams has cited White as an influence on her work.

=== Awards ===
Year	Award	Category	Result
1992	American Society of Composers, Authors and Publishers	Deems Taylor Award	Won
2014	American Book Awards	Anti-Censorship Award	Won

== Bibliography ==
- The Resistance: Ten Years of Pop Culture That Shook the World, 1995 (ISBN 978-0879515867)
- Rebel for the Hell of It: The Life of Tupac Shakur, 2002 (ISBN 978-1560254614)
- Keep Moving: The Michael Jackson Chronicles, 2009 (ISBN 978-0984215904)
- New Position: The Prince Chronicles, 2016 (ISBN 978-1536878561)
- Make Spielberg Great Again: The Steven Spielberg Chronicles, 2020 (ISBN 978-0984215911)

== In popular culture ==
- White is briefly mentioned in Charlie Kaufman's 2020 absurdist novel Antkind. The novel's protagonist, a paranoid film critic, believes White is spying on him with miniature drones disguised as bugs.

== See also ==
- Elvis Mitchell – African-American film critic
- African-American Film Critics Association
- Vulgar auteurism
