= Aglae (disambiguation) =

Aglae is a genus of bees.

Aglae or AGLAE may also refer to:

- Aglaé, a feminine given name
- French frigate Aglaé (1788), a French Navy frigate
- Accélérateur Grand Louvre d'analyse élémentaire (AGLAE), a particle physics facility in the Musée du Louvre, Paris
- Egbert Aglae (born 1980), Seychelles politician

== See also ==
- Aglaia (disambiguation), five figures in Greek mythology
