= KRIMI.DE =

- Country of origin: Germany

Original release
- Network: KiKA

KRIMI.DE is a German crime drama series, aired by the German television channel KiKA between 2005 and 2013. The format of the show involves presenting criminal cases from the perspective of children which then get solved by the child protagonists in coordination with the police. The series was aired in the German states of Erfurt, Hamburg, Jena, Leipzig, Stuttgart and Frankfurt am Main. Following broadcast, the first 4 episodes were released on DVD. Then, in March 2015, 2 box sets were released containing all 32 episodes between them.

== Cast ==
=== Team Erfurt ===
- Constantin von der Decken as Conny
- Mathilde Bundschuh as Julia
- Stefan Tetzlaff as Lukas
- Dominique Horwitz as commissioner Meininger

=== Team Hamburg ===
- Nelia Novoa as Amelie
- Rona Özkan as Coco
- Vijessna Ferkic as police officer Natascha
- Denis Moschitto and Hilmi Sözer in supporting roles

Vijessna Ferkic played the same role in the series Die Pfefferkörner ("The Peppercorns").

=== Team Jena ===
- Miriam Schweiger as Sophie
- David Bode as Ben
- Andreas Patton as commissioner Ralf Vormann

=== Team Leipzig ===
- Luizza Grimm as Mandy
- Maximillian Befort as Tom
- Josef Mattes as Louis
- Peter Sodann as commissioner Bruno Ehrlicher (known from the series Tatort)

=== Team Stuttgart ===
- Jette Hering as Klara Stolz
- Jeremy Mockridge as Tim Mederling
- Liam Mockridge as Maz Mederling
- Richy Müller as chief commissioner Thorsten Lannert (also known from the series Tatort)

=== Team Frankfurt am Main ===
- Mala Emde as Ronja
- Sean Bishop as Jay Jay
- Franz Schönberger as Alex
- Anke Sevenich as Alex' mother
- Rainer Ewerrien as Alex' father
- Jasmin Schwiers as police officer Eva
- Patrick Dewayne as police officer Anthony

== Episodes ==
Episode	Title	Team	Date aired
Season 1
1	Abgezogen	Leipzig	8 March 2005
2	Crash	Leipzig	15 March 2005
Season 2
3	Brenzlig	Leipzig	15 November 2005
4	Nur das Beste	Leipzig	22 November 2005
Season 3
5	Unter Druck	Hamburg	27 December 2006
6	Netzpiraten	Hamburg	28 December 2006
Season 4
7	Bitte recht freundlich!	Jena	2 October 2007
8	Flinke Finger	Erfurt	3 October 2007
9	Gefährliche Verabredung	Jena	8 October 2007
10	Die Gang	Hamburg	15 October 2007
11	Kein zurück	Erfurt	16 October 2007
12	Das Klaukind	Hamburg	18 October 2007
13	Katzenauge	Jena	22 October 2007
14	Bunte Bonbons	Leipzig	23 October 2007
15	Ausgeliefert	Erfurt	24 October 2007
Season 5
16	Chatgeflüster	Erfurt	3 November 2008
17	Nebenan	Erfurt	10 November 2008
Season 6
18	Coco unter Verdacht	Hamburg	14 October 2009
19	Finderlohn	Hamburg	21 October 2009
20	Level 3	Jena	4 November 2009
21	Rechte Freunde	Erfurt	11 November 2009
22	Filmriss	Erfurt	18 November 2009
23	Netzangriff	Stuttgart	26 March 2010
Season 7
24	Schuldig	Erfurt	14 May 2011
25	Der Zeuge	Frankfurt am Main	14 May 2011
26	Muskelspiele	Erfurt	15 May 2011
27	Eigentor	Frankfurt am Main	15 May 2011
Season 8
28	Missbraucht	Erfurt	10 February 2012
29	Falsche Liebe	Erfurt	5 October 2012
Season 9
30	Ehrensache	Frankfurt am Main	5 April 2013
31	Einer von uns	Erfurt	7 April 2013
32	Lebensmüde	Erfurt	20 September 2013

== See also ==
- List of German television series
