= Aglaia (given name) =

Aglaia is a feminine given name that comes from the ancient Greek Grace Aglaia (Ἀγλαΐα). It may also be written Aglaïa or sometimes as Aglaja, Aglaya, or Aglaea.

People named Aglaia include:

- Aglaia Anastasiou (born 1986), Greek swimmer
- Aglaia Coronio (1834–1906), British embroiderer, bookbinder, and art collector
- Aglaia Konrad (born 1960), Austrian photographer and educator
- Aglaia Koras, Greek-American pianist
- Aglaia Kremezi, Greek food writer and journalist
- Aglaia Mortcheva (born 1972), Bulgarian animator, illustrator, voice actress, and professor
- Aglaia Papa (1904–1984), Greek painter
- Aglaia Pezzato (born 1994), Italian swimmer
- Aglaia Szyszkowitz (born 1968), Austrian actress
- Aglaja Brix (born 1990), German actress
- Aglaja Orgeni (1841–1926), Hungarian coloratura soprano
- Aglaya Shilovskaya (born 1993), Russian theater and film actress
- Aglaja Schmid (1926–2003), Austrian stage and film actress
- Aglaja Veteranyi (1962–2002), Swiss writer
- Aglaya Tarasova (born 1994), Russian actress

== In fiction ==
- Aglaia, the wife of Karagiozis
- Aglaia (or Aglaya) Yepanchin is the name of a character that features in Dostoyevsky's The Idiot, where she is the daughter of General Yepanchin.
