= Iris Hanika =

German writer (born 1962)

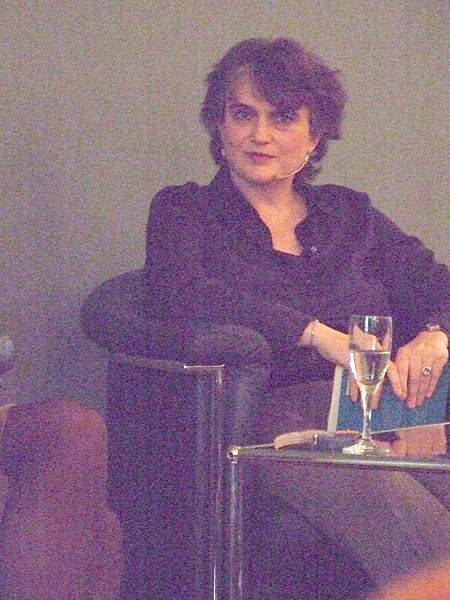
Hanika at Literaturhaus Frankfurt 2008

Iris Hanika (born 1962) is a German writer. She was born in Würzburg, grew up in Bad Königshofen and has lived in Berlin since 1979, where she studied Universal and Comparative Literature at the FU Berlin. She was a regular contributor to German periodicals like Frankfurter Allgemeine Zeitung (freelancer of the Berliner Seiten) and Merkur (2000–2008: column Chronicles). Hanika won the LiteraTour Nord prize and the EU Prize for Literature for her novel Das Eigentliche (The Bottom Line). In 2020, she was awarded the Hermann-Hesse-Literaturpreis for her novel Echos Kammern. In 2021, she won the Leipzig Book Fair Prize. Hanika wrote previously mainly short non-fictional texts, later novels, including two books on psychoanalysis.

== Awards ==
- 2006 Hans Fallada Prize
- 2010 European Union Prize for Literature for Das Eigentliche
- 2011 Preis der LiteraTour Nord for Das Eigentliche
- 2017/2018 Villa Massimo
- 2020 Hermann-Hesse-Literaturpreis for Echos Kammern
- 2021 Leipzig Book Fair Prize for Echos Kammern

== Works ==
- Hanika, Iris (2020). Echos Kammern : Roman (in German). Graz: Literaturverlag Droschl. ISBN 978-3-99059-056-0. OCLC 1193293248.
- —— (2015). Wie der Müll geordnet wird : Roman (in German). Graz: Literaturverl. Droschl. ISBN 978-3-85420-962-1. OCLC 904438449.
- —— (2012). Tanzen auf Beton : Weiterer Bericht von der unendlichen Analyse (in German). Graz: Droschl, M. ISBN 978-3-85420-799-3. OCLC 802668445.
- ——; Hennersdorf, Sonja (2010). Das Eigentliche : Roman (in German). Graz. ISBN 978-3-85420-764-1. OCLC 587764696.
- —— (2008). Treffen sich zwei : Roman (in German). Graz: Droschl. ISBN 978-3-85420-737-5. OCLC 225260310.
- Hanika, Iris (2007). Vor dem Gericht (in German). Berlin. ISBN 978-3-937737-82-9. OCLC 198833649.
- ——; Seifert, Edith (2006). Die Wette auf das Unbewusste, oder, Was Sie schon immer über Psychoanalyse wissen wollten (in German). Frankfurt am Main: Suhrkamp. ISBN 3-518-12457-9. OCLC 70132355.
- —— (2005). Musik für Flughäfen : kurze Texte (in German). Frankfurt am Main: Suhrkamp. ISBN 978-3-518-12404-8. OCLC 62206120.
- —— (2003). Das Loch im Brot : Chronik (in German). Frankfurt am Main: Suhrkamp. ISBN 3-518-12438-2. OCLC 52901445.
- —— (1992). Katharina, oder, Die Existenzverpflichtung : Erzählung (in German). Berlin: Fannei & Walz. ISBN 3-927574-14-7. OCLC 27727247.
