= Thelma Adams =

American author and film critic

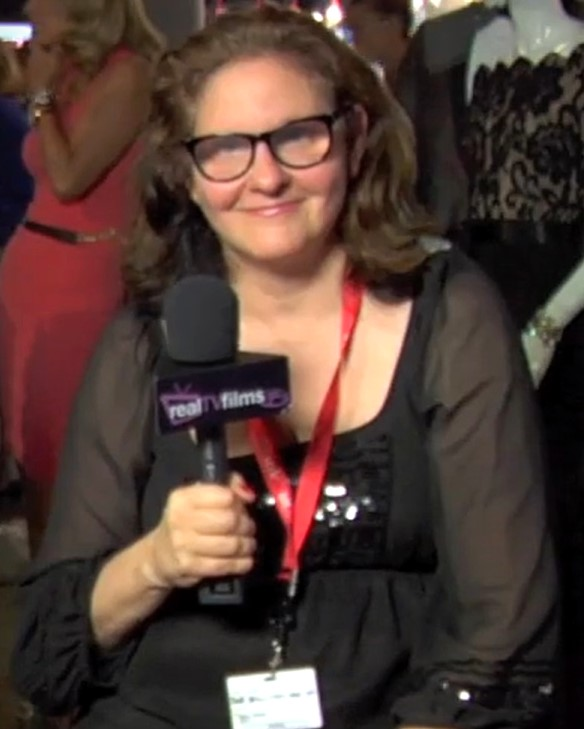
- Adams in 2013
- Born: Thelma Michelle Schwartz; February 7, 1959 (age 67); Los Angeles, California, U.S.
- Education: University of California, Berkeley (BA); University of California, Los Angeles (MBA); Columbia University (MFA)
- Occupations: Author; film critic
- Spouse: Ranald Adams (m. 1986)
- Children: 2
- Writing career
- Years active: 1986–present
- Website: thelmadams.com

Thelma Michelle Adams (née Schwartz; February 7, 1959) is an American author and film critic. She wrote the historical fiction novel The Last Woman Standing. Adams also served as the chair of the New York Film Critics Circle twice, and worked as a contributing editor at Yahoo! Movies, Us Weekly, and the New York Post.

Adams has written for various outlets, including The New York Times, Cosmopolitan, The Huffington Post, and Variety.

== Early life ==
Thelma Michelle Schwartz was born into a Jewish family in Los Angeles, California to parents, Lawrence and Rosalie Schwartz. In 1981 Adams graduated from UC Berkeley, having majored in history and was the valedictorian of her graduating class. During this time she was a member of Phi Beta Kappa along with the editor of the campuses writing journal, The Berkeley Poetry Review. Adams went on to get her MBA in Arts Administration from UCLA in 1985, before getting her MFA in Fiction from the Columbia University School of the Arts. While pursuing her education Adams worked in various internship programs with groups like the American History Association and the American Film Institute.

== Career ==
In 1986 Adams married her husband Ranald, before spending the next decade working for various humanitarian and arts groups around the New York area. In 2000 Adams began employment with Us Weekly, soon publishing stories on the entertainment industry in various magazines and publications. During her time working at Yahoo! Movies, Adams was sent to the Oscars to cover the events as their red carpet reporter for three years, interviewing celebrities such as Julianne Moore, Joaquin Phoenix and Oprah Winfrey in the process.

Adams debut novel, Playdate was published in 2011, receiving positive reviews from The New York Times and other critics.

In 2016, Adams published her second book, The Last Woman Standing which become a best seller. The book was noted for its feminist messages, along with its historical accuracy. In July, 2016 Adams went on tour to promote her book.

=== Film criticism ===
Working for The Huffington Post, Adams declared that in the 2008 film The Reader, the relationship between Hannah and Michael was "abusive, more disturbing than any of the historical questions in the movie", and that the tasteful treatment of the sex scenes meant audiences "wouldn't see the film for the child pornography it was". The screenwriter, David Hare, dismissed her observations as "the most ridiculous thing ... We went to great lengths to make sure that that's exactly what it didn't turn into. The book is much more erotic."

== Personal life ==
Adams married her husband Ranald Adams, a solution architect for HP, in 1986. Today Adams lives in Hyde Park, New York with her family.
