= Aglaé =

Aglaé (other form: Aglaë) is a French female given name. Notable people with the name include:

- Aglaé Adanson (1775–1852), French horticulturalist, writer
- Aglaé Auguié (c. 1787–1854), French court official
- Charlotte Aglaé d'Orléans (c. 1700–1761), French noblewoman
- Aglaé de Polignac (c. 1768–1803), French noblewoman
- Aglaé de Gramont (c. 1787–1842), French noblewoman
- Aglaé Cadet (c. 1738–1801), French enamelist and painter
- Aglaé Joséphine Savatier, birth name of Apollonie Sabatier (c. 1822–1890), French courtesan, salon holder, artists' muse, and bohemian

== See also ==
- Aglaia
