= Alain Claude Sulzer =

Swiss writer and translator (born 1953)

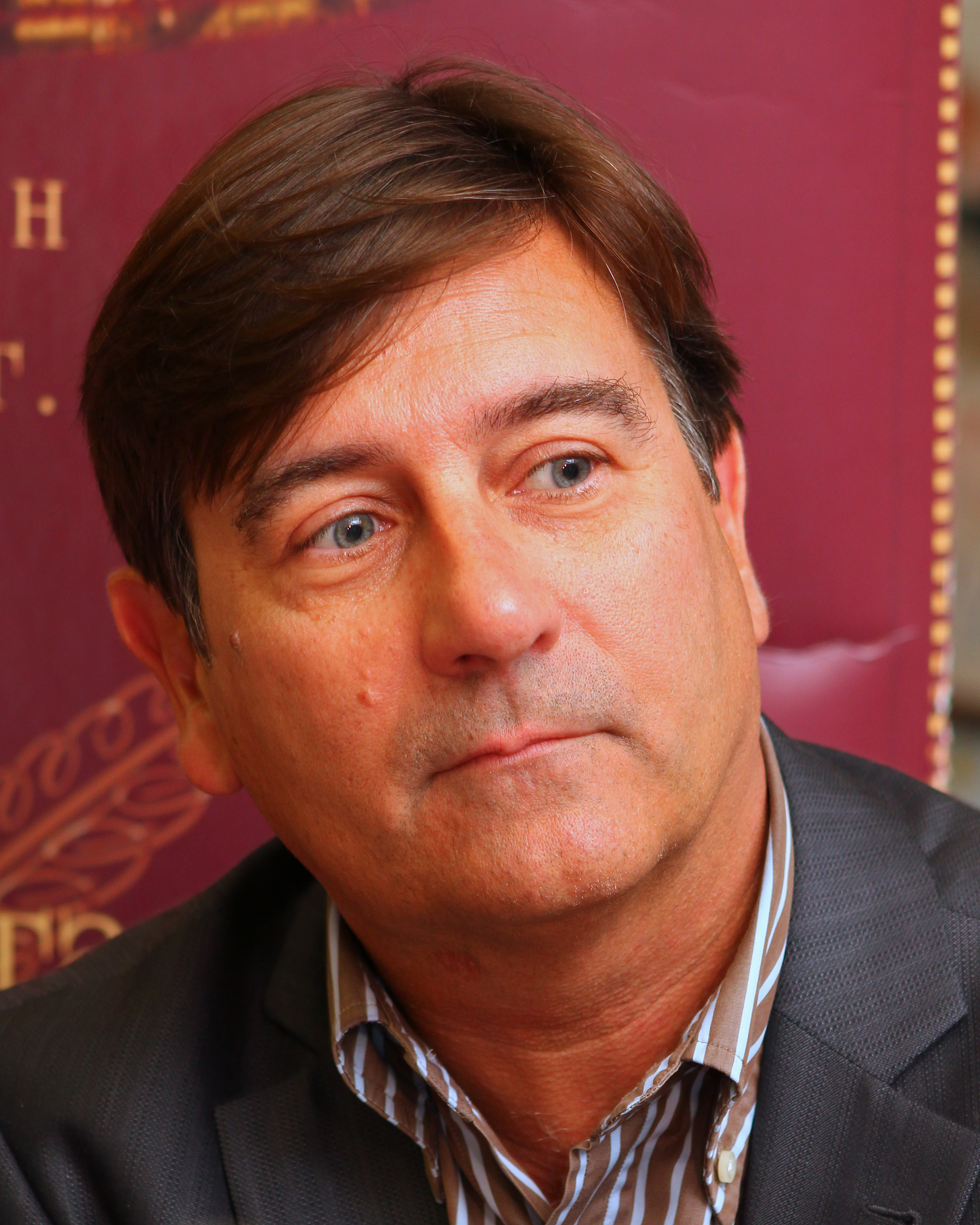
Sulzer in 2011

Alain Claude Sulzer (born 17 February 1953) is a Swiss writer and translator. He was born in Riehen, near Basel. Sulzer became a librarian, but also translated from French, for example parts of Julien Green's diaries. As a journalist he wrote for various newspapers and magazines, including the NZZ. He has published more than ten books and has won several literary awards in the process, such as the Rauris Literature Prize (1984), or the Hermann-Hesse-Preis (2009).

His novel A Perfect Waiter won the Prix Medicis Etranger and the Prix des Auditeurs de la Radio Suisse Romande and has been translated into several languages. Another novel Aus den Fugen has also met with critical and commercial success and is set to be translated into English. Die Jugend ist ein fremdes Land, was published in September 2017 by Kiepenheuer & Witsch.

He lives with his partner, the theatre actor Georg Martin Bode, in Basel, Alsace and Berlin.

== Awards ==
- 1984 Rauris Literature Prize for Das Erwachsenengerüst
- 2008 Prix Medicis Etranger for Un garçon parfait
- 2009 Hermann-Hesse-Literaturpreis for Privatstunden

=== Memberships ===
- 2022 PEN Berlin

== Works ==
- Sulzer, Alain Claude (1983). Das Erwachsenengerüst: Roman (in German). München: List. ISBN 3-471-78622-8. OCLC 15222318.
- —— (1990). Die siamesischen Brüder: Roman (in German). Stuttgart: Klett-Cotta. ISBN 3-608-95702-2. OCLC 23187329.
- —— (1998). Urmein: Roman (in German). Stuttgart: Klett-Cotta. ISBN 3-608-93447-2. OCLC 40119835.
- —— (2001). Annas Maske: Novelle (in Norwegian). Zürich: Edition Epoca. ISBN 3-905513-23-4. OCLC 47853957.
- —— (2004). Ein perfekter Kellner: Roman (in German). Zürich: Edition Epoca. ISBN 3-905513-36-6. OCLC 57389038.
- —— (2010). Zur falschen Zeit: Roman (in German). Berlin: Galiani. ISBN 978-3-86971-019-8. OCLC 668112452.
- —— (2012). Aus den Fugen: Roman (in German). Köln: Kiepenheuer & Witsch. ISBN 978-3-86971-059-4. OCLC 801719501.
- —— (2017). Postskriptum Roman (in German). Köln: Verlag Kiepenheuer & Witsch. ISBN 978-3-462-05039-4. OCLC 964393176.
- —— (2017). Die Jugend ist ein fremdes Land (in German). Köln: Galiani Berlin. ISBN 978-3-86971-150-8. OCLC 986995718.
- ——; Nüsseler, Hannes (2018). Basel. Berlin, Schweiz: Schwabe AG. ISBN 978-3-7965-3822-3. OCLC 1037888316.
- —— (2019). Unhaltbare Zustände. Roman (in German). Berlin: Galiani Berlin. ISBN 978-3-86971-194-2. OCLC 1096292583.
- —— (2022). Doppelleben. Roman (in German). Köln: Galiani Berlin. ISBN 978-3-86971-249-9. OCLC 1341588446.

=== English translations ===
- Sulzer, Alain Claude; Brownjohn, John (2008). A perfect waiter. London. ISBN 978-0-7475-9023-1. OCLC 166367246.
- ——; Brownjohn, John (2014). Catalyst: a novel. London. ISBN 978-1-78308-271-1. OCLC 876002405.

=== French translations ===
- Sulzer, Alain Claude; Honigmann, Johannes (2012). Un garçon parfait : roman (in French). Arles: Actes Sud. ISBN 978-2-330-00660-0. OCLC 798397555.
- ——; Honigmann, Johannes (2016). Post-Scriptum. Paris: Jacqueline Chambon. ISBN 978-2-330-06656-7. OCLC 959543970.
- ——; Honigmann, Johannes (2018). La jeunesse est un pays étranger : récit (in French). [Paris]: J. Chambon. ISBN 978-2-330-09720-2. OCLC 1032233142.
- ——; Honigmann, Johannes (2020). Sous la lumière des vitrines : roman (in French). [Arles]. ISBN 978-2-330-13958-2. OCLC 1197949490.
- ——; Chambon, Jacqueline (2022). Les vieux garçons (in French). [Paris]. ISBN 978-2-330-16624-3. OCLC 1334997619.

=== Italian translations ===
- Sulzer, Alain Claude (2013). Il concerto (in Italian). Palermo: Sellerio. ISBN 978-88-389-3082-9. OCLC 898713010.
- —— (2016). Post scriptum. Palermo: Sellerio. ISBN 978-88-389-3519-0. OCLC 982270314.

=== Dutch translation ===
- Sulzer, Alain Claude; Vlaming, Annemarie (2013). Uit de toon (in Dutch). Amsterdam: Anthos. ISBN 978-90-414-2256-9. OCLC 849751124.

=== Finnish translation ===
- Sulzer, Alain Claude; Sarrivaara, Olli (2019). Sietämättömiä tilanteita (in Finnish). Helsinki. ISBN 978-952-7380-02-4. OCLC 1199709024.
