= Hermann-Hesse-Literaturpreis =

German literary award

The Hermann-Hesse-Literaturpreis is a literary prize of Germany in honour of German-born Swiss writer, poet and Nobel Prize winner Hermann Hesse.

The award is presented in Karlsruhe. The prize sum is 15,000 Euros. Previous winners include Martin Walser, Hubert Fichte, Rafik Schami, Adolf Muschg, and Alain Claude Sulzer.

Not to be confused with the Calw Hermann Hesse Prize or the prize of the Internationale Hermann-Hesse-Gesellschaft (unofficial English name: International Hermann Hesse Society), which was awarded for the first time in 2017.

== Recipients ==
The following have received the prize:

- 1957: Martin Walser for Ehen in Philippsburg
- 1962: Ernst Augustin for Der Kopf
- 1965: Hubert Fichte for Das Waisenhaus
- 1968: Hans Saner for Kants Weg vom Krieg zum Frieden
- 1971: Mario Szenessy for Lauter falsche Pässe
- 1974: Adolf Muschg for Albissers Grund
- 1977: Dieter Kühn for Ich, Wolkenstein
- 1980: Ernst-Jürgen Dreyer for Die Spaltung
- 1984: Natascha Wodin for Die gläserne Stadt
- 1988: Uwe Pörksen for Die Ermordung Kotzebues oder Kinder der Zeit
- 1991: Gerhard Meier for Land der Winde
- 1994: Rafik Schami for Der ehrliche Lügner
- 1997: Klaus Merz for Jakob schläft
- 1999: Markus Werner for Der ägyptische Heinrich
- 2001: Marlene Streeruwitz for Nachwelt
- 2003: Klaus Böldl for Die fernen Inseln
- 2005: Hans-Ulrich Treichel for Menschenflug
- 2007: Antje Rávic Strubel for Kältere Schichten der Luft
- 2009: Alain Claude Sulzer for Privatstunden
- 2012: Annette Pehnt for Chronik der Nähe
- 2014: Angelika Klüssendorf for April
- 2016: Christian Kracht for The Dead (Die Toten)
- 2018: Thomas Hettche for unsere leeren herzen. Über Literatur
- 2020: Iris Hanika for Echos Kammern
- 2022: Sasha Marianna Salzmann for Im Menschen muss alles herrlich sein
- 2024: Eckhart Nickel for Punk
