= Helga Schubert =

German psychologist and writer

- Schubert in 2026
- Born: 7 January 1940 (age 86); Berlin, Germany
- Education: Humboldt University of Berlin
- Occupations: Writer, psychologist, psychotherapist
- Spouse: Johannes Helm (m. 1976; died 2025)
- Writing career
- Language: German
- Genres: Short stories, prose, children's literature, screenplays
- Notable awards: Heinrich Mann Prize (1986); Hans Fallada Prize (1993); Ingeborg Bachmann Prize (2020)

Helga Schubert (born 7 January 1940 in Berlin; pen name of Helga Helm) is a German writer, psychologist and psychotherapist. She began writing while working as a clinical psychologist in East Germany. Her literary work includes short prose, children's books, plays, radio and television plays, and screenplays. After German reunification, she became particularly known for Judasfrauen, a documentary literary work about women who denounced others during the Nazi period. In 2020, at the age of 80, she won the Ingeborg Bachmann Prize for her text Vom Aufstehen.

== Life ==
=== Early life and psychology ===
Schubert was born in Berlin in 1940. Her mother was an economist who worked as a librarian; her father, a judicial assessor, died as a soldier in 1941. Schubert grew up in East Berlin. After completing her secondary education in 1957, she worked for a year on an assembly line in a Berlin industrial plant.

From 1958 to 1963 she studied psychology at Humboldt University of Berlin, graduating with a diploma in psychology. From 1963 she worked as a clinical psychologist and in adult psychotherapy. Between 1973 and 1977 she pursued academic work at Humboldt University with the intention of completing a doctorate, which she did not finish. From 1977 to 1987 she was involved in the training of therapists and worked at a marriage counselling centre in Berlin.

=== Literary career ===
Schubert began writing in her twenties. Her first book, the collection of stories Lauter Leben, appeared in 1975. Alongside prose and children's literature she wrote plays, radio and television plays, and screenplays. Her screenplay for the 1982 film Die Beunruhigung received a screenplay prize at the second National Feature Film Festival of the GDR.

Schubert's writing frequently drew on everyday experience and on her work as a psychologist. After the end of the GDR, she received particular attention for Judasfrauen. Zehn Fallgeschichten weiblicher Denunziation im Dritten Reich, a literary-documentary work based on archival research into ten cases of women who denounced others during the Nazi period.

She was a member of the Writers' Association of the GDR and later of the East German PEN centre. During the political transformation of 1989–1990, she served as a non-party press spokeswoman at the Central Round Table in East Berlin.

=== Ingeborg Bachmann Prize ===
In 1980, Schubert was invited by writer Günter Kunert to participate in the Days of German-Language Literature in Klagenfurt, where the Ingeborg Bachmann Prize is awarded. The East German authorities, however, refused to allow her to travel to Austria. She later served on the competition's jury from 1987 to 1990.

Forty years after her first invitation, Schubert returned to the competition in 2020. Invited by literary critic Insa Wilke, she read Vom Aufstehen. On 21 June 2020 she was awarded the Ingeborg Bachmann Prize.

The text subsequently gave its title to the 2021 collection Vom Aufstehen. Ein Leben in Geschichten. The book presents episodes from Schubert's life against the background of German history from the Second World War through the GDR to reunified Germany. It was nominated for the Leipzig Book Fair Prize.

In 2023, Schubert published Der heutige Tag. Ein Stundenbuch der Liebe, an autobiographically based account of everyday life with her seriously ill husband, psychologist and painter Johannes Helm.

Her collection Luft zum Leben. Geschichten vom Übergang was published in 2025. It brings together stories from different periods of her writing career, including previously unpublished and out-of-print texts.

=== Personal life ===
Schubert was married to psychologist and painter Johannes Helm from 1976 until his death. The couple lived in Neu Meteln near Schwerin in Mecklenburg-Vorpommern. Johannes Helm died there on 22 August 2025 at the age of 98.

== Works ==
- Lauter Leben, Berlin, 1975
- Bimmi und das Hochhausgespenst, Berlin, 1980
- Bimmi und die Victoria A, Berlin, 1981 (with Jutta Kirschner)
- Die Beunruhigung, Berlin, 1982
- Bimmi und der schwarze Tag, Berlin, 1982 (with Jutta Kirschner)
- Das verbotene Zimmer, Darmstadt, 1982
- Bimmi und ihr Nachmittag, Berlin, 1984 (with Jutta Kirschner)
- Blickwinkel, Berlin, 1984
- Anna kann Deutsch, Darmstadt, 1985
- Und morgen wieder ..., Berlin, 1985
- Schöne Reise, 1988
- Über Gefühle reden?, Berlin, 1988
- Gehen Frauen in die Knie?, Zürich, 1990 (with Rita Süssmuth)
- Judasfrauen. Zehn Fallgeschichten weiblicher Denunziation im Dritten Reich, Berlin, 1990
- Bezahlen die Frauen die Wiedervereinigung?, Munich, 1992 (with Rita Süssmuth)
- Bimmi vom hohen Haus, Berlin, 1992 (with Cleo-Petra Kurze)
- Die Andersdenkende, Munich, 1994
- Das gesprungene Herz, Munich, 1995
- Die Welt da drinnen, Frankfurt am Main, 2003
- Vom Aufstehen. Ein Leben in Geschichten, Munich, 2021
- Der heutige Tag. Ein Stundenbuch der Liebe, Munich, 2023
- Luft zum Leben. Geschichten vom Übergang, Munich, 2025

== Filmography ==
- Heute abend und morgen früh (1980), screenplay
- Die Beunruhigung (1982), screenplay
- Verzeihung, sehen Sie Fußball? (1983), screenplay
- Ab heute erwachsen (1985), screenplay

== Awards and honours ==
- 1982: Screenplay Prize at the second National Feature Film Festival of the GDR, for Die Beunruhigung
- 1983: Heinrich Greif Prize
- 1986: Heinrich Mann Prize
- 1991: Honorary Doctor of Humane Letters, Purdue University
- 1993: Hans Fallada Prize
- 2020: Ingeborg Bachmann Prize, for Vom Aufstehen
- 2024: Cross of the Order of Merit of the Federal Republic of Germany
- 2024: Cultural Prize of the State of Mecklenburg-Vorpommern
