= Mario Szenessy =

German writer (1930–1976)

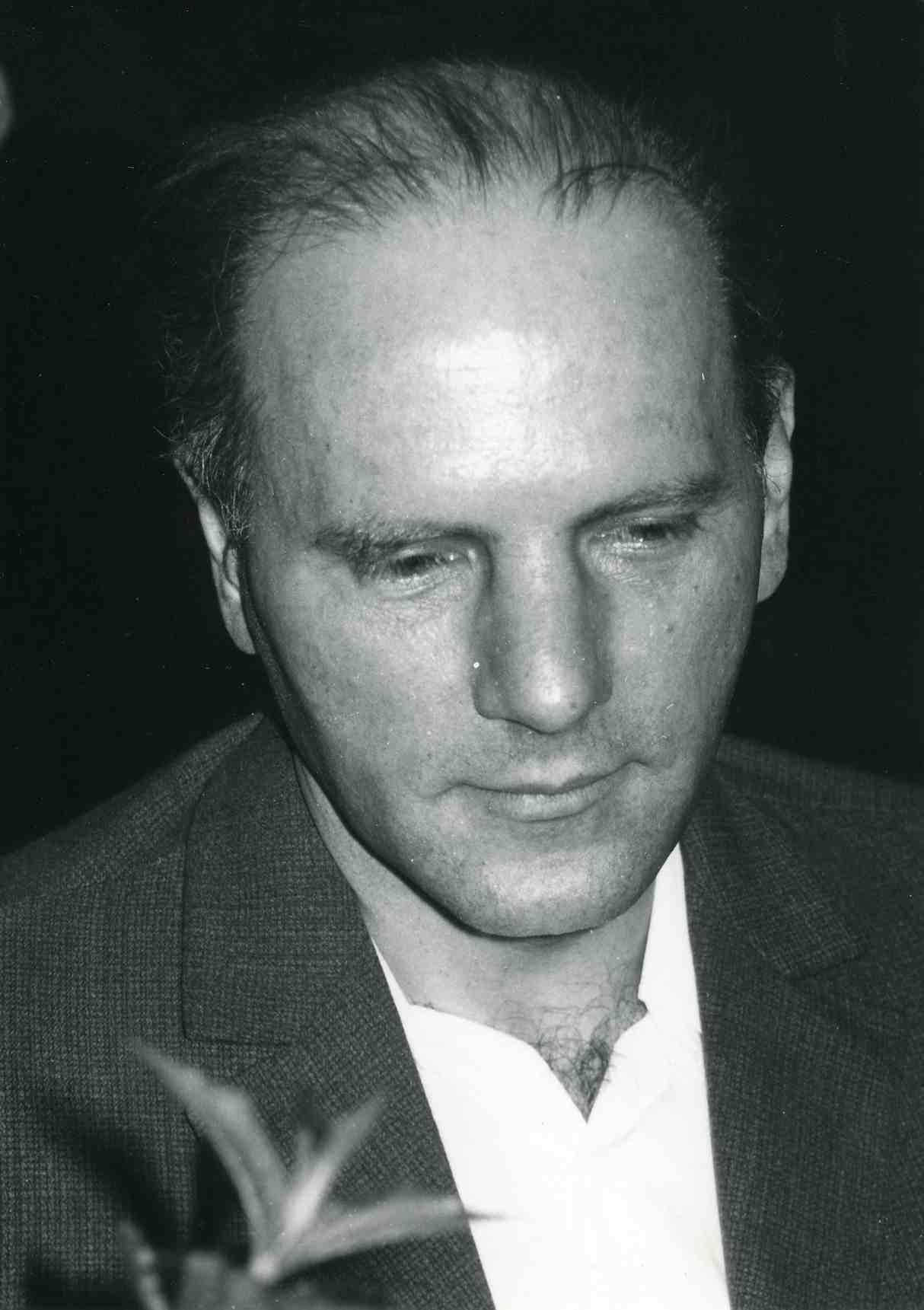
- Born: 30 September 1930; Veliki Bečkerek, Kingdom of Yugoslavia (now Zrenjanin, Serbia)
- Died: 11 October 1976 (aged 46); Pinneberg, West Germany (now Germany)
- Known for: Novels, short stories, translations
- Scientific career
- Fields: Literature

Mario Szenessy (14 September 1930 in Veliki Bečkerek, Yugoslavia (today Zrenjanin, Serbia) – 11 October 1976 in Pinneberg, West Germany (today Germany)) was a Hungarian-German author, translator, and literary critic.

== Biography ==
Mario Szenessy grew up in the Vojvodina in a multiethnic, multilingual environment. In 1942 his family moved to Szeged, Hungary where he studied German and Slavic languages and discovered the writings of Kafka and Thomas Mann. He became a school teacher and also taught Russian at the Medical Academy, (today Szeged University). Based on his writings about Thomas Mann he received a grant by the Alexander von Humboldt Foundation and thus came to the University of Tübingen in 1963, where he worked on Mann's novella Die Betrogene. Later, he moved to West Berlin. Encouraged by Inge and Walter Jens, Szenessy started to write in German and published his first book in 1967, Verwandlungskünste. Marcel Reich-Ranicki wrote: He who is not a German writes a much better German than almost all who publish books in Germany... bitter, sarcastic, and full of temperament, sharp, springy and lapidary. When Szenessy's books failed to gain a wider audience, he began to write critiques and translations, and eventually decided to become qualified as a librarian. In 1971, Szenessy received the Hermann-Hesse-Preis for his novel Lauter falsche Pässe oder Die Erinnerungen des Roman Skorzeny.

Mario Szenessy died from a bronchial carcinoma in Pinneberg in 1976.

== Work ==
Szenessy wrote in the epic tradition of Thomas Mann, his literary role model, and his first book received highly favorable critiques. Thus the Süddeutsche Zeitung called him a new, wonderful narrator. When, however, he made literary concessions to gain a greater audience, critics bemoaned this development. Yet, remarkable remains Szenessy’s art to so completely enter into the German language that it had become finally his home. He tried to popularize East-European literature in Germany; especially the Hungarian authors György Konrád and Tibor Déry he made more familiar with translations as well as a monograph.

In his novel Lauter falsche Pässe (1971), Szenessy stylized the image of the typical entertainment novel by treating the genre in a sarcastic fashion, thus transferring it into a work of art. In the book the author receives a manuscript that represents an autobiography of Roman Skorzeny. Skorzeny recalls how after falsifying stamps, he proceeds to manufacture the accompanying letters, and then the related biographies. The text demonstrates the patterns of a fascinating narration whereby the first name of the fictitious author (- In German Roman also means novel -) indicates that in this book the subject is the novel per se. Presented are the political thriller, the espionage and criminal novel, the sailors’ yarn and Anglo romantic accounts of mail coach robberies. The introduction is a parody of the classical Bildungsroman and cites existing travesty in literature. The genre of the trivial novel presents itself as a novel in all its forms as if to prove that the novel is just not a lower art form.

== Publications ==
- In Paris mit Jim. Stories with an afterword by Peter Wapnewski. Hoffmann und Campe, Hamburg 1977, ISBN 3-455-07589-4
- Der Hellseher. Novel. Hoffmann und Campe, Hamburg 1974, ISBN 3-455-07593-2
- Der Hut im Gras. Novel. Hoffmann und Campe, Hamburg 1973. ISBN 3-455-07591-6
- Lauter falsche Pässe oder Die Erinnerungen des Roman Skorzeny. Novel. Hoffmann und Campe, Hamburg 1971. ISBN 3-455-07590-8
- Tibor Déry. Monographie. Kohlhammer, Stuttgart 1970
- Otto, der Akrobat. Stories. S. Fischer, Frankfurt/M 1969
- Verwandlungskünste. Novel. S. Fischer, Frankfurt/M 1967

== Translations from Hungarian to German ==
- György Konrád: Der Besucher. Novel. Luchterhand, Darmstadt 1973, ISBN 3-472-86333-1
- György Konrád: Der Stadtgründer. Novel. List, München 1975, ISBN 3-471-77938-8

== About Szenessy ==
- Otto F. Beer: "Dieser Zauberlehrling bleibt bescheiden". In: Der Tagesspiegel 20 October 1974
- Marcel Reich-Ranicki: "Ein Neuankömmling betrachtet uns. Mario Szenessys bemerkenswerter Erzählungsband 'Otto der Akrobat'". In: Die Zeit 31 October 1969
- Jochen Schmidt: "Ein Parforceritt und allerlei literarische Zaubertricks". In: Frankfurter Allgemeine Zeitung 8 October 1974
- Eugen Skasa-Weiß: "Des Urknalls letzter Akt". In: Stuttgarter Zeitung 23 October 1971
- Heinrich Vormweg: "Geheimniskrämerei um einen falschen Schelm. Mario Szenessys Roman, Lauter falsche Pässe’". In: Süddeutsche Zeitung 9/10 October 1971
- Willi Winkler: "Mario Szenessy". In: Kritisches Lexikon zur deutschsprachigen Gegenwartsliteratur – KLG. ISBN 978-3-88377-927-0
