= Hubert Fichte =

German novelist (1935–1986)

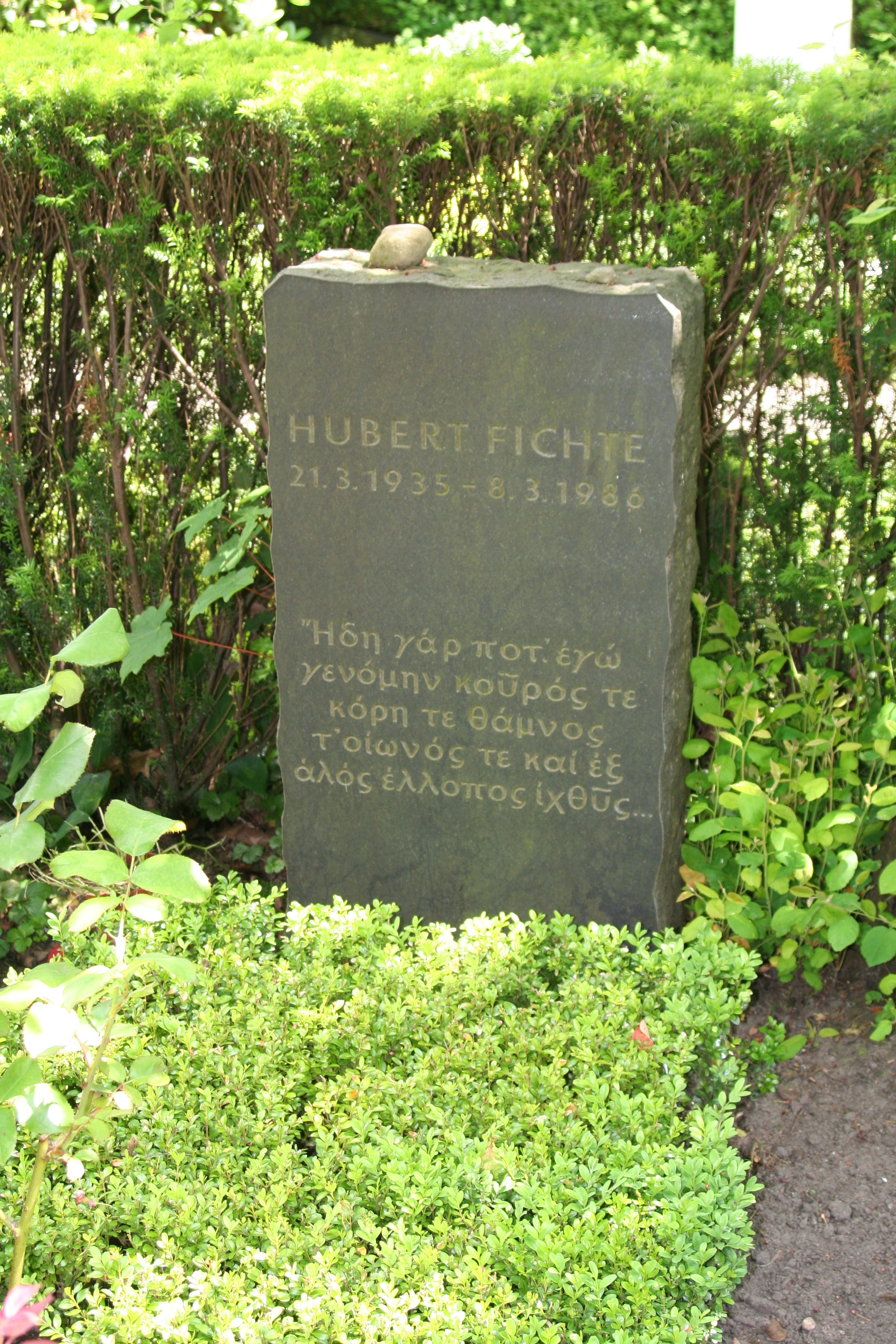
- Born: 21 March 1935; Perleberg, Province of Brandenburg, Germany
- Died: 8 March 1986 (aged 50); Hamburg, Germany
- Occupation: Novelist

Hubert Fichte (German: [ˈhuː.bɛʁt ˈfɪç.tə]; 21 March 1935, Perleberg, Province of Brandenburg – 8 March 1986, Hamburg) was a German novelist.

== Life ==
Hubert Fichte was born on 21 March 1935 in Perleberg Hospital. A few weeks after his birth his family moved to Hamburg-Lokstedt. Fichte's mother worked as stenographer and he was mostly raised by his grandmother. His father, a Jewish merchant, emigrated to Sweden and Fichte never met him. His parents were not married. As a child Fichte was made to believe he was a half-orphan. He received an education as an actor and as a farmer. In the late fifties he worked in Montjustin, not far from Forcalquier in Provence, as a shepherd for several months at painter Serge Fiorio. From 1961 on he lived in Hamburg.

In the mid-1960s, Fichte published his first novels. He then had a regular column called Plattenragout (record ragout) in the magazine konkret. In 1966 he criticised the German police's work in those days in an article called "the police – your friend and aide": "Shall the baton displace arguments, humour, understanding from the side of the police in this young democracy, burdened with an evil mortgage?" (konkret, Nr. 8). His main influences were Marcel Proust, Hans Henny Jahnn and Jean Genet. With Genet he did a famous interview. He first met Jahnn in 1949 and Jahnn helped Fichte reveal his homosexuality. Fichte described their friendship in his novel Versuch über die Pubertät (Attempt about the puberty) in 1974.

In the 1970s, Fichte devoted himself increasingly to ethnological research. From 1971 to 1975 he travelled to Bahia (Brazil), Haiti and Trinidad several times. He later described the works based on this travels, like Xango (1976) and Petersilie, (1980) as "Ethnopoesie". With them he created his very own technique of combining science and poetry. A sort of "domestic ethnology" was done with his St. Pauli interviews like in Wolli Indienfahrer (St. Pauli is a famous low income and subculture district in Hamburg). Fichte's cohabitee (since 1961) Leonore Mau published her photograph volumes Xango and Petersilie at the same time.

In the late sixties, Fichte began writing his main work Die Geschichte der Empfindlichkeit (the history of the sensibility, or: the story of the pettishness) a monumental cycle of novels. His last set of plans showed his intention to write nineteen books, most of them novels, but also some volumes of essays, called “Glossen”. For these “Glossen” he wanted to compile and rewrite much of his journalistic work like radio features, news paper articles and interviews. The novels describe the life of the homosexual writer “Jäcki” and his cohabitee “Irma”, an older woman and photographer. Fichte could not finish the whole cycle. The existing parts were published after his death. They contain 6 complete novels, 2 fragments of novels, 4 “Glossen”-volumes and 5 supplement volumes. The latter contain interviews, articles and features he wanted to use for “Glossen” books, but could not revise them. At least three more novels he had planned are completely missing.

Fichte died of AIDS-related illness in 1986. He is buried in the Nienstedten Cemetery. Since 1995 the city of Hamburg has awarded the Hubert Fichte Prize for extraordinary literary works.

== Awards ==
- 1963 Julius Campe Stipend
- 1965 Hermann-Hesse-Literaturpreis
- 1967 Stipend of the Villa Massimo (Rome)
- 1985 Alexander Zinn Prize
- Minor planet 3475 Fichte is named after him.

== Selected works ==
- Der Aufbruch nach Turku (The departure for Turku, novellas) Hoffmann & Campe, Hamburg 1963
- Im Tiefstall (In the low barn, novella) Galerie im Centre, Göttingen 1965
- Das Waisenhaus (The orphanage, novel) Rowohlt, Reinbek 1965
- Die Palette (The palette, novel) Rowohlt, Reinbek 1968
- Detlevs Imitationen »Grünspan« (Detlevs imitations »verdigris«, novel) Rowohlt, Reinbek 1971
- Versuch über die Pubertät (Attempt about the puberty, novel) Hoffmann & Campe, Hamburg 1974
- Xango. Die afroamerikanischen Religionen II. Bahia. Haiti. Trinidad (Xango. The afroamerican religions II) Fischer, Frankfurt 1976
- Wolli Indienfahrer (Wolli, traveler to India) Fischer, Frankfurt a.M. 1978
- Petersilie. Die afroamerikanischen Religionen IV. Santo Domingo. Venezuela. Miami. Grenada (Parsley. The afroamerican religions IV) Fischer, Frankfurt 1980
- Psyche. Anmerkungen zur Psychiatrie in Senegal (Psyche. Remarks on the psychiatry in Senegal) Qumran, Frankfurt 1980
- Zwei Autos für den Heiligen Pedro Claver (Two cars for the holy Pedro Claver) Qumran, Frankfurt 1982
- Lazarus und die Waschmaschine. Kleine Einführung in die Afroamerikanische Kultur (Lazarus and the washing machine. Small introduction to the afroamerican culture) Fischer, Frankfurt 1985
- Die Geschichte der Empfindlichkeit (The History of the sensibility / The story of the pettishness) Fischer, Frankfurt 1987ff.
- Ödipus auf Håknäss (Oedipus on Håknäss, drama) Fischer, Frankfurt 1992
- St. Pauli Geschichte (St. Pauli story) Berlin (Transit) Berlin 2006
- Ketzerische Bemerkungen für eine neue Wissenschaft vom Menschen (Heretical comments for a new science on mankind) Hamburg (EVA) 2001

== Films about Hubert Fichte ==
- Hubert Fichte – der schwarze Engel (Hubert Fichte: The Black Angel), 2005 documentary. Running time 60 minutes.
- Palette revisited, 2005 documentary. Running time 67 minutes.
