= The Reader (2008 film) =

2008 film by Stephen Daldry

- Theatrical release poster
- Directed by: Stephen Daldry
- Screenplay by: David Hare
- Based on: Der Vorleser by Bernhard Schlink
- Produced by: Anthony Minghella; Sydney Pollack; Donna Gigliotti; Redmond Morris
- Starring: Kate Winslet; Ralph Fiennes; David Kross; Lena Olin; Bruno Ganz
- Cinematography: Chris Menges; Roger Deakins
- Edited by: Claire Simpson
- Music by: Nico Muhly
- Production companies: Mirage Enterprises; Neunte Babelsberg Film GmbH
- Distributed by: The Weinstein Company (United States); Senator Film (Germany)
- Release dates: December 12, 2008 (United States); February 26, 2009 (Germany)
- Running time: 124 minutes
- Countries: Germany; United States
- Languages: English; (German)
- Budget: $32 million
- Box office: $108.9 million

The Reader is a 2008 romantic drama film directed by Stephen Daldry, scripted by David Hare, adapting the 1995 German novel Der Vorleser by Bernhard Schlink, and starring Kate Winslet, Ralph Fiennes, David Kross, Bruno Ganz, and Karoline Herfurth. The film tells the story of Michael Berg, a Berlin lawyer who, as a 15-year-old in 1958, has a brief summer love affair with an older woman, Hanna Schmitz. She abruptly leaves, only to resurface years later as one of the defendants in a war crimes trial stemming from her actions as a guard at a Nazi concentration camp. Michael realizes that Hanna is keeping a personal secret she believes is worse than her Nazi past — a secret which, if revealed, could help her at the trial.

The Reader was the last film for producers Anthony Minghella and Sydney Pollack, both of whom died prior to its release. Production began in September 2007, and the film opened in limited release on 10 December, 2008. It received average to favourable reviews from critics, with praise for Winslet and Kross's performances, but with some faults in its screenplay and direction. For her performance, Winslet won the Academy Award and BAFTA Award for Best Actress, as well as the Golden Globe and SAG Award for Best Supporting Actress.

== Plot ==
In 1958, 15-year-old Michael Berg becomes sick on a tram ride in an unnamed provincial city. He is helped by 36-year-old tram conductor Hanna Schmitz. Weeks later, he has recovered from scarlet fever and at his mother's insistence visits Hanna with flowers to thank her for her help. They proceed to have a secret summer love affair, and Hanna often asks Michael to read to her. They have a brief cycling holiday in the country where Michael starts to notice some oddities in Hanna's behaviour. However, as their sexual relationship deepens it grows more tumultuous, when his attempts to form a deeper connection are rebuffed by her secretive nature. As a good reliable worker, Hanna is soon promoted, whereupon she abruptly leaves without explanation. Michael visits Hanna to apologize following an argument, but is confused and devastated to find her apartment vacant.

In 1966, Michael is a student at Heidelberg University Law School and observes a war crime trial of several former female SS guards accused of letting 300 Jewish women and children perish in a burning church during a death march near Kraków in Poland. He is horrified to learn that Hanna is one of the defendants. Survivor Ilana Mather provides testimony, including that Hanna forced some of the prisoners to read to her. Hanna admits that she and the co-defendants each chose 10 women monthly for extermination at Auschwitz in Nazi-occupied Poland.

Ilana's mother Rose testifies that when the church caught fire during a bombing, the guards refused to unlock the doors. The official SS report stated that the guards did not know about the fire until the following day, but Hanna reveals that they in fact kept the doors locked so that the prisoners could not escape. Her co-defendants all state she was in command and wrote the report, but she denies this, insisting they agreed on the contents of the report together. When the lead judge asks for a handwriting sample, Hanna quickly condemns herself by admitting she authored the report alone. Recalling their time together, Michael is initially confounded by her testimony, finally deducing that she is deeply ashamed of being illiterate.

Michael informs his law professor, who states that he should inform the court. Deeply conflicted, he attempts to visit Hanna in prison but changes his mind. Hanna receives a sentence of life imprisonment, while her co-defendants are sentenced to just over four years each.

Michael attempts to move on and marries, but cannot commit fully to the relationship and grows distant from his family, culminating in divorce and estrangement from his daughter Julia. Throughout the 1980s, he records himself on tape reading various books and regularly mails them to Hanna. Borrowing the same books from the prison library, Hanna slowly teaches herself to read and write. She starts writing to Michael, but he never replies.

In 1988, a prison official requests Michael's help with Hanna's parole as he has been the only person outside prison to have had contact with her. He finally visits her, revealing in the stilted reunion that he has secured her a residence and a job. When he arrives for her release, he is told she hanged herself in her cell and left a crude will asking him to give her money to Ilana Mather.

Michael finds Ilana in New York City, revealing his connection to Hanna and its long-lasting impact. He tells Ilana about Hanna's illiteracy, but she rebuffs this and refuses to forgive her. Michael gives her Hanna's tea tin filled with cash, but she refuses the money. He suggests that it be donated to a Jewish literacy organization in Hanna's name and she agrees. She keeps the tin, placing it next to a photograph of her deceased family.

The film ends in 1995 with Michael driving Julia to Hanna's grave, telling her their story.

== Cast ==
- Kate Winslet as Hanna Schmitz
- Ralph Fiennes as Michael Berg (1980s → 1990s)
- David Kross as younger Michael Berg (1950s → 1960s)
- Bruno Ganz as Prof. Rohl, Michael's law tutor at Heidelberg and a Holocaust survivor
- Alexandra Maria Lara as Ilana Mather, a concentration camp survivor (1960s)
- Lena Olin as Rose Mather, Ilana's mother and a concentration camp survivor (1960s) and Ilana Mather (1990s)
- Vijessna Ferkic as Sophie, Michael's friend at school
- Karoline Herfurth as Marthe, Michael's friend at university
- Burghart Klaußner as the judge at Hanna's trial
- Linda Bassett as Frau Brenner, prison official
- Hannah Herzsprung as Julia, Michael's daughter (1995)
- Jeanette Hain as Brigitte, Michael's girlfriend (1995)
- Susanne Lothar as Carla Berg, Michael's mother
- Matthias Habich as Peter Berg, Michael's father
- Florian Bartholomäi as Thomas Berg, Michael's brother
- Alissa Wilms as Emily Berg, Michael's sister
- Sylvester Groth as the prosecutor at Hanna's trial
- Fabian Busch as the defense lawyer at Hanna's trial
- Volker Bruch as Dieter Spenz, a student in the seminar group

== Production ==
In April 1998, Miramax Films acquired the rights to the novel The Reader. Principal photography began in September 2007 after Stephen Daldry was signed to direct the film adaptation written by David Hare with Ralph Fiennes cast in a lead role. Kate Winslet was originally cast as Hanna, but scheduling difficulties with Revolutionary Road led her to leave the film and Nicole Kidman was cast as her replacement. However in January 2008, Kidman left the project, citing her recent pregnancy as the primary reason. She had not then filmed any scenes so the studio was able to recast Winslet without affecting the production schedule.

Filming took place in Berlin, Görlitz and on the Kirnitzschtal tramway near Bad Schandau and finished in the MMC Studios Köln in Cologne on 14 July. Filmmakers received $718,752 from Germany's Federal Film Board. The studio received a total of $4.1 million from Germany's regional and federal subsidiaries.

Schlink insisted the film be shot in English rather than German, since it posed questions about living in a post-genocide society that went beyond mid-century Germany. Daldry and Hare toured locations from the novel with Schlink, viewed documentaries about that period in German history and read books and articles about women who had served as SS guards in the camps. Hare, who rejected using a voiceover narration to render the long internal monologues in the novel, also changed the ending so that Michael starts to tell the story of Hanna and him to his daughter. "It's about literature as a powerful means of communication, and at other times as a substitute for communication", he explained. The filming of sex scenes with Kross and Winslet was delayed until Kross was 18. A merkin was designed for her frontal nude scenes but she refused to wear it.

The primary cast, all of whom were German besides Fiennes, Olin and Winslet, decided to emulate Kross's accent since he had just learned English for the film. Chris Menges replaced Roger Deakins as cinematographer. One of the film's producers, Scott Rudin, left the production over a dispute about the rushed editing process to ensure a 2008 release date and had his name removed from the credit list. Rudin differed with Harvey Weinstein "because he didn't want to campaign for an Oscar along with Doubt and Revolutionary Road, which also stars Winslet." Winslet won the Academy Award for Best Actress for The Reader. Marc Caro wrote, "Because Winslet couldn't get Best Actress nominations for both movies, the Weinstein Co. shifted her to supporting actress for The Reader as a courtesy ..." but that it is "... up to [the voters] to place the name in the category that they think is appropriate to the performance", resulting in her receiving more Best Actress nomination votes for this film than the Best Actress submission of her Revolutionary Road performance. Winslet's head-to-head performances also won the Golden Globe Award for Best Actress in a Motion Picture – Drama for Revolutionary Road and the Golden Globe Award for Best Supporting Actress – Motion Picture for The Reader.

Entertainment Weekly reported that to "age Hanna from cool seductress to imprisoned war criminal, Winslet endured seven and a half hours of makeup and prosthetic prep each day."

Lisa Schwarzbaum of Entertainment Weekly writes that "Ralph Fiennes has perhaps the toughest job, playing the morose adult Michael – a version, we can assume, of the author. Fiennes masters the default demeanor of someone perpetually pained."

== Release ==
On December 10, 2008 The Reader had a limited release at 8 theaters and grossed $168,051 at the domestic box office in its opening weekend. The film had its wide release on January 30, 2009, and grossed $2,380,376 at the domestic box office. The film's widest release was at 1,203 theaters on February 27, 2009, the weekend after the Oscar win for Kate Winslet.

In total, the film has grossed $34,194,407 at the domestic box office and $108,901,967 worldwide. The film was released on DVD in the U.S. on April 14, 2009, and April 28 on Blu-ray. Both versions were released in the UK on May 25, 2009. In Germany two DVD versions (single disc and 2-disc special edition) and Blu-ray were released on September 4, 2009.

== Reception ==
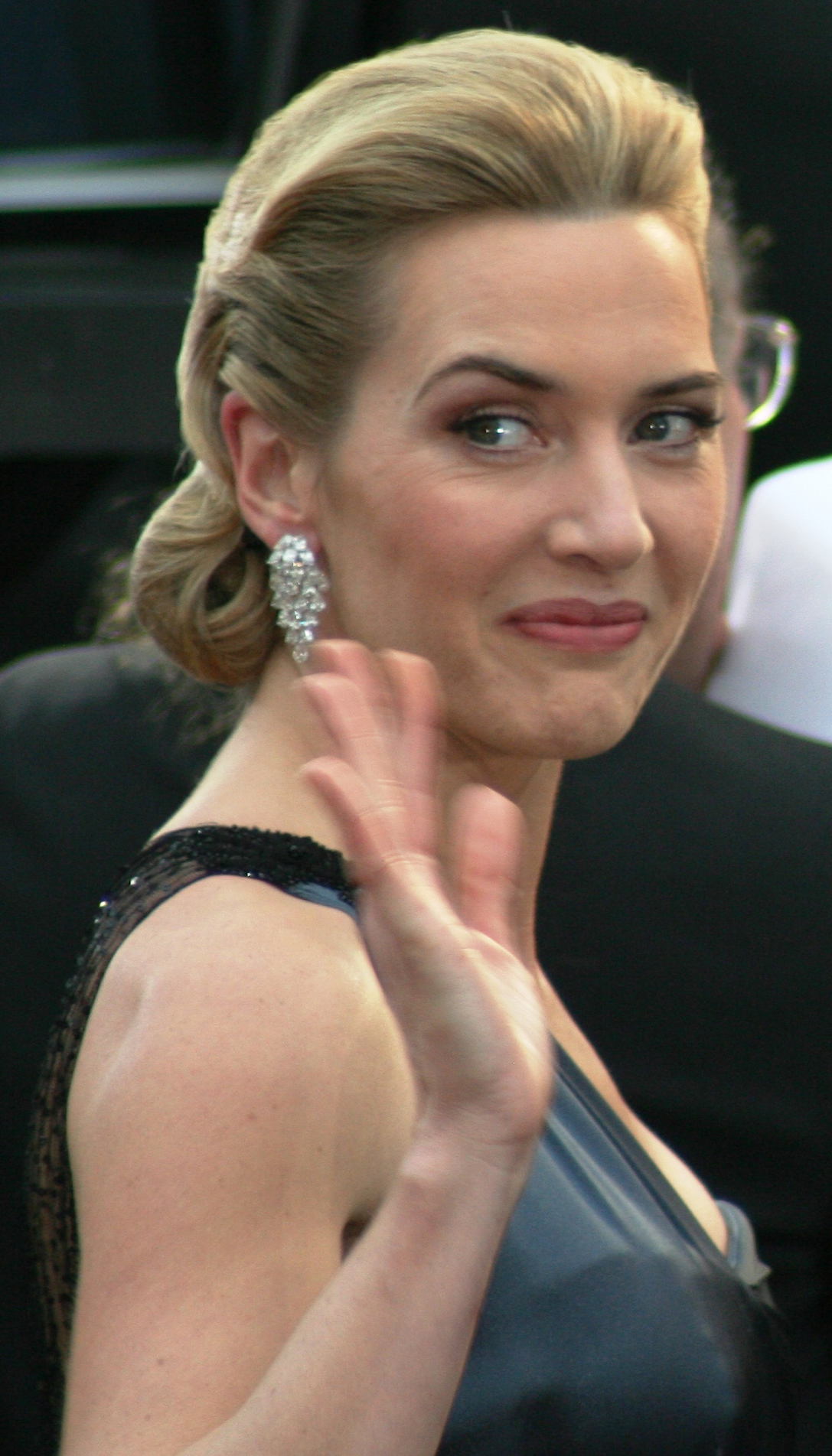
Kate Winslet's performance garnered high critical acclaim, and she won the Academy Award for Best Actress, the first of her career after five previous nominations.

=== Critical response ===
On Rotten Tomatoes, the film holds an approval rating of 63% based on 202 reviews, with an average rating of 6.4/10. The site's consensus states, "Despite Kate Winslet's superb portrayal, The Reader suggests an emotionally distant, Oscar-baiting historical drama." At Metacritic the film was assigned a weighted average score of 58 out of 100, based on 38 critics, indicating "average or mixed reviews".

Ann Hornaday of The Washington Post wrote, "This engrossing, graceful adaptation of Bernhard Schlink's semi-autobiographical novel has been adapted by screenwriter David Hare and director Stephen Daldry with equal parts simplicity and nuance, restraint and emotion. At the center of a skein of vexing ethical questions, Winslet delivers a tough, bravura performance as a woman whose past coincides with Germany's most cataclysmic and hauntingly unresolved era." Manohla Dargis of The New York Times wrote, "You have to wonder who, exactly, wants or perhaps needs to see another movie about the Holocaust that embalms its horrors with artfully spilled tears and asks us to pity a death-camp guard. You could argue that the film isn't really about the Holocaust, but about the generation that grew up in its shadow, which is what the book insists. But the film is neither about the Holocaust nor about those Germans who grappled with its legacy: it's about making the audience feel good about a historical catastrophe that grows fainter with each new tasteful interpolation."

Patrick Goldstein wrote in the Los Angeles Times, "The picture's biggest problem is that it simply doesn't capture the chilling intensity of its source material," and noted there was a "largely lackluster early reaction" to the film by most film critics. Most felt that while the novel portrayed Hanna's illiteracy as a metaphor for generational illiteracy about the Holocaust, the film failed to convey those thematic overtones.

Ron Rosenbaum was critical of the film's fixation on Hanna's illiteracy, saying, "so much is made of the deep, deep exculpatory shame of illiteracy – despite the fact that burning 300 people to death doesn't require reading skills – that some worshipful accounts of the novel (by those who buy into its ludicrous premise, perhaps because it's been declared "classic" and "profound") actually seem to affirm that illiteracy is something more to be ashamed of than participating in mass murder ... Lack of reading skills is more disgraceful than listening in bovine silence to the screams of 300 people as they are burned to death behind the locked doors of a church you're guarding to prevent them from escaping the flames. Which is what Hanna did, although, of course, it's not shown in the film."

Kirk Honeycutt's review in The Hollywood Reporter was more generous, concluding the picture was a "well-told coming-of-age yarn" but "disturbing" for raising critical questions about complicity in the Holocaust. He praised Winslet and Kross for providing "gutsy, intense performances", noted that Olin and Ganz turn in "memorable appearances", and noted that the cinematographers, Chris Menges and Roger Deakins, lent the film a "fine professional polish". Colm Andrew of the Manx Independent also rated the film highly and observed it had "countless opportunities to become overly sentimental or dramatic and resists every one of them, resulting in a film which by its conclusion, has you not knowing which quality to praise the most".

At The Huffington Post, Thelma Adams found the relationship between Hanna and Michael, which she termed abusive, more disturbing than any of the historical questions in the movie: "Michael is a victim of abuse, and his abuser just happened to have been a luscious retired Auschwitz guard. You can call their tryst and its consequences a metaphor of two generations of Germans passing guilt from one to the next, but that doesn't explain why filmmakers Daldry and Hare luxuriated in the sex scenes – and why it's so tastefully done audiences won't see it for the child pornography it is."

When asked to respond, Hare called it "the most ridiculous thing ... We went to great lengths to make sure that that's exactly what it didn't turn into. The book is much more erotic." Daldry added, "He's a young man who falls in love with an older woman who is complicated, difficult and controlling. That's the story."

The film appeared on several critics' top ten lists of the best films of 2008. Rex Reed of The New York Observer named it the second best film of 2008. Stephen Farber of The Hollywood Reporter named it the fourth best film of 2008, Tasha Robinson of The A.V. Club named it the eighth best film of 2008, and Roger Ebert of the Chicago Sun-Times placed it on his unranked top 20 list.

Special praise went to Winslet's acting. She then swept the main prizes in the 2008/2009 award season, including the Golden Globe, the Critic's Choice Award, and the Screen Actor's Guild Award for Best Supporting Actress, and the BAFTA and the Academy Award for Best Actress.

Several writers noted that her success seemed to have made real her appearance in the BBC comedy Extras, in which she played a fictionalized version of herself desperate to win an Academy Award. In the episode, Winslet decided to increase her chance of winning an Oscar by starring in a film about the Holocaust, noting that such films were often awarded Oscars. However, in the fictional film, Winslet played a nun sheltering children from the Holocaust rather than one of its perpetrators. Winslet commented that the similarity "would be funny", but the connection didn't occur to her until "midway through shooting the film ... this was never a Holocaust movie to me. That's part of the story and provides something of a backdrop, and sets the scene. But to me it was always an extraordinarily unconventional love story."

Some historians criticised the film for making Schmitz an object of the audience's sympathy and accused the filmmakers of Holocaust revisionism.

=== Awards and nominations ===
Award	Category	Name	Outcome
Academy Awards	Best Picture	Sydney Pollack, Anthony Minghella, Redmond Morris and Donna Gigliotti	Nominated
Academy Awards	Best Director	Stephen Daldry	Nominated
Academy Awards	Best Actress	Kate Winslet	Won
Academy Awards	Best Adapted Screenplay	David Hare	Nominated
Academy Awards	Best Cinematography	Roger Deakins and Chris Menges	Nominated
BAFTA Awards	Best Film	Sydney Pollack, Anthony Minghella, Redmond Morris and Donna Gigliotti	Nominated
BAFTA Awards	Best Director	Stephen Daldry	Nominated
BAFTA Awards	Best Actress	Kate Winslet	Won
BAFTA Awards	Best Adapted Screenplay	David Hare	Nominated
BAFTA Awards	Best Cinematography	Roger Deakins and Chris Menges	Nominated
Broadcast Film Critics Association	Top 10 Films of the Year		Won
Broadcast Film Critics Association	Best Film		Nominated
Broadcast Film Critics Association	Best Supporting Actress	Kate Winslet	Won
Broadcast Film Critics Association	Best Young Performer	David Kross	Nominated
Golden Globe Awards	Best Picture – Drama		Nominated
Golden Globe Awards	Best Director – Motion Picture	Stephen Daldry	Nominated
Golden Globe Awards	Best Screenplay	David Hare	Nominated
Golden Globe Awards	Best Supporting Actress – Motion Picture	Kate Winslet	Won
San Diego Film Critics Society	Best Actress	Kate Winslet	Won
Satellite Awards	Top 10 Films of 2008		Won
Satellite Awards	Best Actress – Motion Picture Drama	Kate Winslet	Nominated
Satellite Awards	Best Director	Stephen Daldry	Nominated
Satellite Awards	Best Film – Drama		Nominated
Satellite Awards	Best Adapted Screenplay	David Hare	Nominated
Screen Actors Guild Awards	Outstanding Performance by a Female Actor in a Supporting Role	Kate Winslet	Won
