= Stefan Korioth =

Stefan Korioth (born June 12, 1960) is a German lawyer and professor of public law and ecclesiastical law at LMU Munich.

Korioth studied law in Mannheim, Heidelberg and Bonn and completed his Second State Exam (Bar Exam equivalent) in Hamburg. His Ph.D. dissertation on Rudolf Smend's constitutional theory (Integration und Bundesstaat. Ein Beitrag zur Staats- und Verfassungslehre Rudolf Smends, 1990) was supervised by Bernhard Schlink. Korioth completed his habilitation thesis on the constitutional framework of fiscal relations and equalization (Der Finanzausgleich zwischen Bund und Ländern) in 1996, and was appointed professor of public law, constitutional history and theory of the state at University of Greifswald. He has held a chair for public law and ecclesiastical law at LMU Munich since 2000.

Korioth's research concentrates on the constitutional law of public finance, law and religion, constitutional history, and the German Federal Constitutional Court (the Bundesverfassungsgericht). He has written textbooks on the Federal Constitutional Court, constitutional law, German constitutional history, and the constitutional framework of law and religion, and regularly acts as counsel before the Federal Constitutional Court and constitutional courts at state level.
