= Aglaia Koras =

Greek-American pianist

Aglaia Koras is a Greek-American pianist.

== Biography ==
Aglaia Koras made her debut at age eleven with the San Francisco Symphony Orchestra. Mentored by Greek pianist Gina Bachauer, Koras studied, as a full-scholarship recipient, at the Curtis Institute of Music with Rudolf Serkin and Mieczyslaw Horszowski, who was associated with Pablo Casals.

Koras completed her Bachelor of Music Degree from the Curtis Institute of Music in 1979 and her Master of Music Degree from Temple University in 1981, where she served simultaneously as a faculty member.

== Career ==
Koras' international solo career has included solo performances at Alice Tully Hall at Lincoln Center, Weill Recital Hall at Carnegie Hall, Merkin Concert Hall in New York, the Kennedy Center Concert Hall in Washington, DC., and solo performances in France, England, Greece, Spain, Switzerland, Mexico, and Canada.

=== Performances ===
Koras has performed throughout the United States. Her appearances as guest soloist include the San Francisco Symphony, the Sacramento Symphony, the Columbus Symphony, the Cincinnati Chamber Orchestra, the Denver Chamber Orchestra, the Queens Philharmonia, the Los Angeles Debut Orchestra, the National Symphony Orchestra, the Berkeley Promenade Orchestra, and the California Youth Symphony Orchestra. She has performed as guest soloist with conductors JoAnn Falletta, Arthur Fiedler, Harry Newstone, Carter Nice, Paul Polivnick, Michael Nowak, Verne Sellin, among others.

Performances include Alice Tully Hall at Lincoln Center, Bruno Walter Auditorium at Lincoln Center, Weill Recital Hall at Carnegie Hall, Merkin Concert Hall in New York, the Kennedy Center Concert Hall in Washington, DC., the Phillips Gallery in Washington, DC, Lisner Auditorium, Strathmore Hall, American University, the Philadelphia Museum of Art, WHYY Radio Philadelphia, Temple University, University of Toronto, University of California at Los Angeles, University of Southern California, El Camino College, Metropolitan College, WETA Radio, KVOD Radio Denver, Fort Worth, Texas, Brigham Young University in Utah, Brazilian Radio, Spanish television, concerts in England, France, Greece, Spain, Switzerland, Mexico, and Canada.

Since 2006, Koras has performed twice yearly at Weill Recital Hall at Carnegie Hall, where she has presented world premiere performances by living composers, as well as cycles by Beethoven, Chopin, and works by a wide variety of composers.

=== Honors ===
Koras won first prize in the American Music Scholarship Association International Piano Competition in Cincinnati, first prize in the International Chopin Young Pianists Competition in Buffalo, New York; first prize in the National Young Musicians Foundation Competition in Los Angeles; "Fine Artistry and Musical Excellence Award" from the Concert Artists Guild Competition in New York; finalist in the Chopin Koszciusko Competition in New York; La Gesse Foundation Fellow of France; and winner of the Ruth Slenczynska Award for Piano, among other prizes.

== Discography ==
Discography includes her 2005 CD "Aglaia", which features works by Mozart, Bach, Chopin, Brahms, Mussorgsky, Prokofieff, and Samuel Barber, and her 2004 CD "Richard Strauss Burlesk for Piano Solo and Orchestra in D minor", among other recordings.
