= Die Pfefferkörner =

- Old logo (until 2016)
- Created by: Katharina Mestre
- Country of origin: Germany
- No. of seasons: 21
- No. of episodes: 273

Production
- Running time: 28 minutes

Original release
- Network: KI.KA
- Release: 27 December 1999 – present

Die Pfefferkörner (English: The Peppercorns) is a German television series produced by KIKA, featuring 21 seasons.

The Peppercorns are five friends from Hamburg: Jana Holstein Coutre (Anna-Elena Herzog), Natasha "Tascha" Jaonzäns (Vijessna Ferkic), Philip "Fiete" Overbeck (Julian Paeth), Cem Gülec (Ihsan Ay) and Vivien "Vivi" Overbeck (Aglaia Brix), Fiete's eight-year-old sister. After school, the young detectives meet at a high level of a spice warehouse of the company Overbeck & Associates, which belongs to Fiete and Vivi's parents in the first part, but is later given to Fiete and Vivi to look after. Here, in the historic warehouse district, the five friends have their headquarters.

With smarts, combined delivery and support of the Internet, they find their cases here. The detectives convict polluters, animal dealers and drug smugglers. They also help each other with personal problems they encounter. Cem has lost his parents in a car accident and sometimes feels sad and lonely. Jana lives with her divorcee mother, a lawyer who is rarely at home. Natasha comes from Latvia. Her parents initially have very strict rules in terms of her education, that make Natasha unhappy. Fiete has problems showing his feelings and hides them behind grumpiness and hostility towards girls, until he falls in love with Natasha. Vivi is suffering from her role of the youngest member of the group. She believes that she must constantly struggle for recognition.

The jointly-lined adventure and conflicts can always be resolved eventually by the peppercorns, working together and relying on each other in a dedicated community.

== See also ==
- List of German television series
