= Berkeley Poetry Review =

Berkeley Poetry Review (BPR) is an American poetry journal published annually by the undergraduate students at the University of California, Berkeley since 1974.

The journal has featured a wide array of poets and writers, including:

- Pablo Neruda
- Czesław Miłosz
- Lawrence Ferlinghetti
- Thom Gunn
- Leslie Scalapino
- Galway Kinnell
