= Aglaia Anastasiou =

Greek synchronized swimmer

Personal information
- Born: 28 February 1986 (age 40) Athens, Greece

Sport
- Sport: Synchronised swimming

Aglaia Anastasiou (born 28 February 1986) is a Greek former synchronized swimmer who competed in the 2004 Summer Olympics.
