= Bernhard Schlink =

German writer (born 1944)

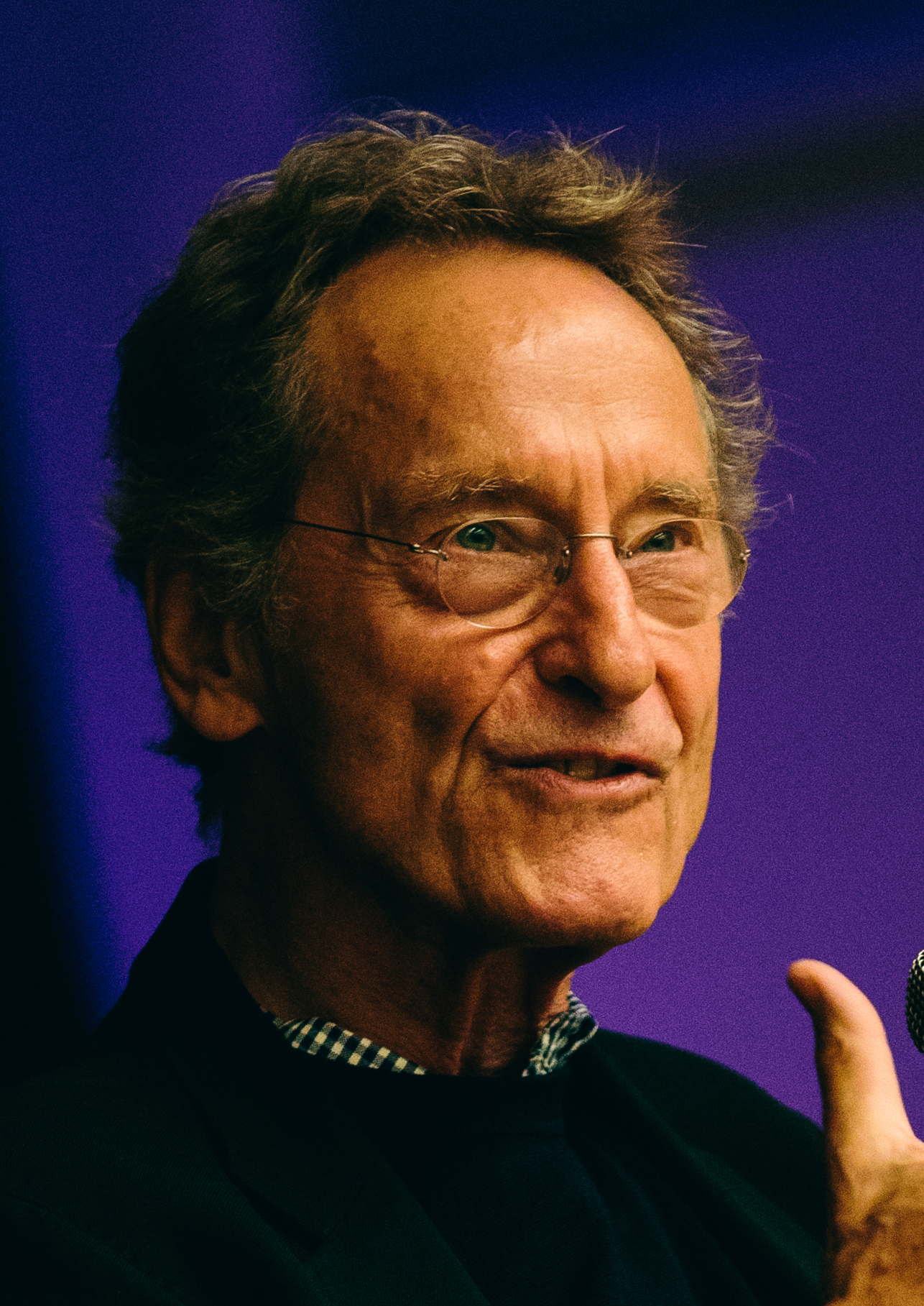
- Schlink in 2018
- Born: Bernhard Schlink; 6 July 1944 (age 82); Bielefeld, Germany
- Education: University of Heidelberg (Dr. jur.); University of Freiburg (Hab.)
- Occupations: Author; professor; judge
- Relatives: Edmund Schlink (father)
- Writing career
- Notable work: The Reader

Bernhard Schlink (German: [ˈbɛʁn.haʁt ʃlɪŋk]; born 6 July 1944) is a German lawyer, academic, and novelist. He is best known for his novel The Reader, which was first published in 1995 and became an international bestseller. He won the 2014 Park Kyong-ni Prize.

== Early life ==
He was born in Großdornberg, near Bielefeld, to a German father (Edmund Schlink) and a Swiss mother, the youngest of four children. His mother, Irmgard, had been a theology student of his father, whom she married in 1938. (Edmund Schlink's first wife had died in 1936.) Bernhard's father had been a seminary professor and pastor in the anti-Nazi Confessing Church. In 1946, he became a professor of dogmatic and ecumenical theology at Heidelberg University, where he would serve until his retirement in 1971. Over the course of four decades, Edmund Schlink became one of the most famous and influential Lutheran theologians in the world and a key participant in the modern Ecumenical Movement. Bernhard Schlink was brought up in Heidelberg from the age of two. He studied law at West Berlin's Free University, graduating in 1968.

Schlink became a judge at the Constitutional Court of the federal state of North Rhine-Westphalia in 1988 and in 1992 a professor for public law and the philosophy of law at Humboldt University, Berlin. Among Schlink's academic students are Stefan Korioth and Ralf Poscher. He retired in January 2006.

== Career ==
Schlink studied law at the University of Heidelberg and at the Free University of Berlin. He worked as a research assistant at the Universities of Darmstadt, Bielefeld and Freiburg. He had been a law professor at the University of Bonn and Johann Wolfgang Goethe University Frankfurt am Main before he started in 1992 at Humboldt University of Berlin. Subsequently, Schlink "turned his dual talent as legal expert and writer into his trademark". He started his career as an author of fiction with several detective novels with the main character named Selb—a play on the German word for "self"—(the first, Self's Punishment, co-written with Walter Popp being available in the UK). One of these, Die gordische Schleife, won the Glauser Prize in 1989.

In 1995, Schlink published The Reader (Der Vorleser), a novel about a teenager who has an affair with a woman in her thirties who suddenly vanishes but whom he meets again as a law student when visiting a trial about war crimes. The book became a bestseller both in Germany and the United States and was translated into 39 languages. It was the first German book to reach the No. 1 position in the New York Times bestseller list. In 1997, it won the Hans Fallada Prize, a minor German literary prize (awarded by the town of Neumünster), and the Prix Laure Bataillon for works translated into French. In 1999 it was awarded the Welt-Literaturpreis of the newspaper Die Welt.

In 2000, Schlink published a collection of short fiction called Flights of Love. A January 2008 literary tour, including an appearance in San Francisco for City Arts & Lectures, was cancelled due to Schlink's recovery from minor surgery.

In 2008, Stephen Daldry directed a film adaptation of The Reader. In 2010, his non-fiction political history, Guilt About the Past was published by Beautiful Books Limited (UK).

As of 2008, Schlink divides his time between New York and Berlin. He is a member of PEN Centre Germany.

== Prizes ==
- 1989 Friedrich-Glauser-Preis for Die gordische Schleife
- 1993 Deutscher Krimi Preis for Selbs Betrug
- 1995 Stern des Jahres ("Star of the Year") from the Munich newspaper Abendzeitung ("Evening News") for Der Vorleser
- 1997 Grinzane Cavour Prize (Italian) for Der Vorleser
- 1997 Prix Laure Bataillon (French) for Der Vorleser
- 1998 Hans Fallada Prize for Der Vorleser
- 1999 Welt-Literaturpreis for life works
- 2000 Heinrich Heine Prize of the "Heinrich-Heine-Gesellschaft" at Hamburg
- 2000 Evangelischer Buchpreis for Der Vorleser
- 2000 Cultural prize of the Japanese newspaper Mainichi Shimbun awarded yearly to a Japanese bestseller, for Der Vorleser
- 2004 Officer's Cross of the Order of Merit of the Federal Republic of Germany
- 2014 Park Kyong-ni Prize (South Korea)

== Bibliography ==
=== Literary works in German ===
- 1962 Der Andere
- 1987 Selbstjustiz (Self's Punishment; with Walter Popp)
- 1988 Die gordische Schleife (The Gordian Knot), Zurich: Diogenes
- 1992 Selbs Betrug, Zurich: Diogenes
- 1995 Der Vorleser (The Reader), Zurich: Diogenes
- 2000 Liebesfluchten (Flights of Love), Zurich: Diogenes
- 2001 Selbstmord (Self's Murder), Zurich: Diogenes
- 2006 Die Heimkehr (Homecoming: A Novel), Zurich: Diogenes
- 2008 Das Wochenende (The Weekend: A Novel), Zurich: Diogenes
- 2010 Sommerlügen – Geschichten (~ Summer Lies: Stories), Zurich: Diogenes
- 2011 Gedanken über das Schreiben. Heidelberger Poetikvorlesungen. (Essays) Zurich: Diogenes, ISBN 978-3-257-06783-5
- 2014 Die Frau auf der Treppe. (Novel) Zurich: Diogenes, ISBN 978-3-257-06909-9
- 2018 Olga (Novel) Zurich: Diogenes, ISBN 978-3-257-07015-6
- 2020 Abschiedsfarben Zurich: Diogenes ISBN 978-3-257-07137-5
- 2021 Die Enkelin (Novel) Zurich: Diogenes

=== Other works in German ===
- 1976 Abwägung im Verfassungsrecht, Berlin: Duncker und Humblot
- 1980 Rechtlicher Wandel durch richterliche Entscheidung: Beitraege zu einer Entscheidungstheorie der richterlichen Innovation, co-edited with Jan Harenburg and Adalbert Podlech, Darmstadt: Toeche-Mittler
- 1982 Die Amtshilfe: Ein Beitrag zu einer Lehre von der Gewaltenteilung in der Verwaltung, Berlin: Duncker & Humblot
- 1985 Grundrechte, Staatsrecht II, co-authored with Bodo Pieroth, Heidelberg: C.F. Müller
- 2002 Polizei- und Ordnungsrecht, co-authored with Bodo Pieroth and Michael Kniesel, Munich: Beck
- 2005 Vergewisserungen: über Politik, Recht, Schreiben und Glauben, Zurich: Diogenes
- 2015 Erkundungen zu Geschichte, Moral Recht und Glauben, Zurich: Diogenes

=== Titles in English ===
- 1997 The Reader, translated by Carol Brown Janeway, New York: Pantheon Books
- 2001 Flights of Love: Stories, translated by John E. Woods, New York: Pantheon Books
- 2005 Self's Punishment, Bernhard Schlink and Walter Popp, translated by Rebecca Morrison, New York: Vintage Books
- 2007 Self's Deception, translated by Peter Constantine, New York: Vintage Crime/Black Lizard
- 2007 Homecoming translated by Michael Henry Heim, New York: Pantheon Books
- 2009 Self's Murder, translated by Peter Constantine, London: Weidenfeld & Nicolson
- 2009 Guilt about the Past, University of Queensland Press, 9 January 2009, Beautiful Books Limited (UK) February 2010 ISBN 978-1-905636-77-8
- 2010 The Weekend: A Novel, translated by Shaun Whiteside – October 2010
- 2012 Summer Lies (short stories), translated by Carol Brown Janeway, New York: Pantheon Books ISBN 978-0-307-90726-4
- 2016 The Woman on the Stairs. (Novel), translated by Joyce Hackett and Bradley Schmidt. London: Orion ISBN 978-1-474-60065-1
- 2020 Olga. (Novel), translated by Charlotte Collins, London: Weidenfeld & Nicolson ISBN 978-1-4746-1114-5
- 2024 The Granddaughter, translated by Charlotte Collins, London: Weidenfeld & Nicolson ISBN 978-1-399-61486-3
