= Aglaia Kremezi =

Greek food writer and journalist (1947–2026)

- Αγλαΐα Κρεμέζη
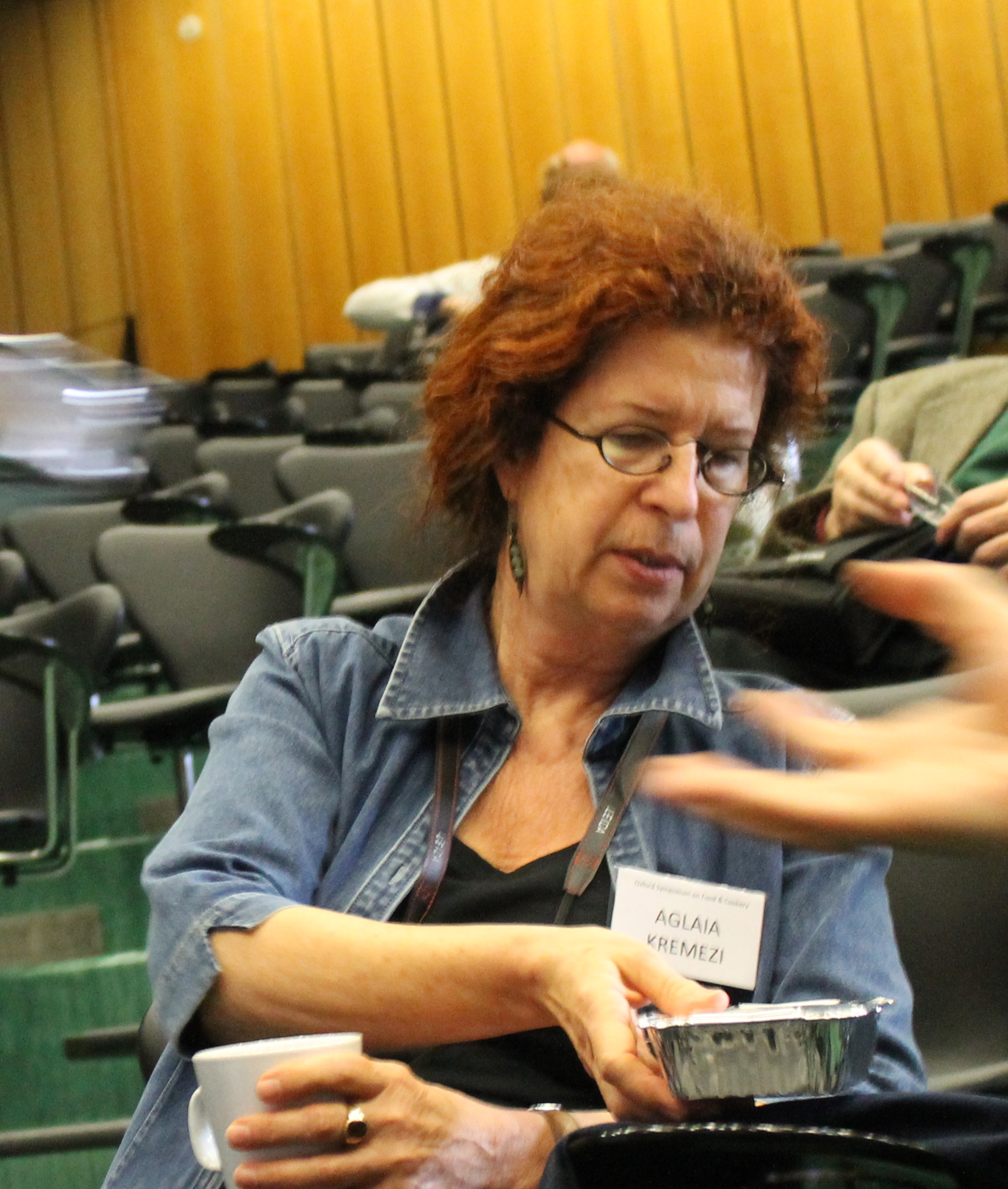
- Kremezi in 2012
- Born: 4 May 1947; Athens, Greece
- Died: 19 May 2026 (aged 79); Athens, Greece
- Occupations: Food writer, journalist
- Writing career
- Genre: Food writing
- Website: www.aglaiakremezi.com

Aglaia Kremezi (Αγλαΐα Κρεμέζη; 4 May 1947 – 19 May 2026) was a Greek food writer and journalist, often considered "one of Greece's foremost cooking authorities".

She lived on the island of Kea, Greece, where she ran a cooking school.

Kremezi died of cancer in Athens, on 19 May 2026, at the age of 79.

== Bibliography ==
- The Mediterranean Pantry: Creating and Using Condiments and Seasonings, 1994
- Mediterranean Hot: Spicy Recipes from Southern Italy, Greece, Turkey and North Africa, 1996
- The Foods of Greece, 1999
- The Foods of the Greek Islands: Cooking and Culture at the Crossroads of the Mediterranean, 2000
