= HMS Aglaia =

Sloop of the Royal Navy

History

France
- Name: Aglaé
- Captured: 18 April 1782

Great Britain
- Name: HMS Aglaia
- Namesake: Aglaia
- Acquired: 18 April 1782
- Fate: Sold, 5 June 1783

General characteristics
- Tons burthen: 30568/94 (bm)
- Length: Overall:94 ft 11 in (28.9 m); Keel:75 ft 9 1/41 in (23.1 m)
- Beam: 27 ft 6 1/2 in (8.4 m)
- Depth of hold: 14 ft 4 1/4 in (4.4 m)
- Complement: Privateer:121; HMS:125
- Armament: Privateer:20 × 6 & 9-pounder guns; HMS:18 × 6-pounder guns

HMS Aglaia was the French privateer Aglaé, captured in 1782 and brought into the Royal Navy. (Note: She was named, in both French and English, for Aglaia, a figure from Greek mythology.) The Royal Navy sold her in 1783.

== Capture ==
On 18 April 1782 Eolus was off Cape Cornwall on her way to Waterford when she encountered the French privateer Aglaé, of Saint Malo. After a chase of eight hours, Captain Collins of Eolus succeeded in capturing his quarry. She was a ship of twenty 6 and 9-pounder guns, with a crew of 121 men, under the command of Sieur Dugué du Laurent. She had been cruising for six days but had not taken any prizes.

Aglaé arrived at Plymouth 2 May. She then sat there and was never commissioned.

== Fate ==
The Admiralty sold Aglaia on 5 June 1783.
