= Hans Fallada Prize =

German literary award

The Hans Fallada Prize is a German literary prize given by the city of Neumünster in the German state of Schleswig-Holstein. Since 1981, it is typically awarded every two years to a young author from the German-speaking world. It is named in honor of Hans Fallada, a famous 20th-century German author known for addressing political and social problems of his day in fiction.

The prize was first awarded in 1981, the fiftieth anniversary of the publication of Fallada's A Small Circus (Bauern, Bonzen und Bomben).

The prize comes with an honorarium of 10,000 euros. In the case that two authors win the award, the prize money is split evenly between the recipients.

== Award winners ==
- 1981: Erich Loest
- 1983: Ludwig Fels
- 1985: Sten Nadolny
- 1988: Ralph Giordano
- 1990: Jurek Becker
- 1993: Helga Schubert
- 1996: Günter Grass
- 1998: Bernhard Schlink
- 2000: Thomas Brussig
- 2002: Birgit Vanderbeke
- 2004: Wilhelm Genazino
- 2006: Iris Hanika
- 2008: Ralf Rothmann
- 2010: Lukas Bärfuss
- 2012: Wolfgang Herrndorf
- 2014: Jenny Erpenbeck
- 2016: Jonas Lüscher
- 2018: Sandra Hoffmann
- 2020: Saša Stanišić
- 2022: Arezu Weitholz
- 2024: Grit Lemke
- 2026: Anja Kampmann
