= Aglaja Brix =

German actress

- Born: Aglaja Brix; August 15, 1990 (age 35); Hamburg, West Germany
- Occupation: Actress
- Years active: 1998–present

Aglaja Brix (born August 15, 1990) is a German actress. She is best known for playing the role of Vivien Overbeck in the TV detective series Die Pfefferkörner.

== Biography ==
Brix was born and raised in Hamburg, Germany. After her debut in the detective series Doppelter Einsatz, Aglaja in 1999 joined the cast of Die Pfefferkörner, the role of Vivien "Vivi" Overbeck, who plays the role until 2005. From 2006 joins an acting career with that of model, posing for photographs and advertising campaigns.

== Filmography ==
Year	Title	Role	Notes
1998	Doppelter Einsatz - "Die Todfreundin"	young Karen	
1999–2005	Die Pfefferkörner	Vivien „Vivi“ Overbeck	
