= 47 Aglaja =

Main-belt asteroid

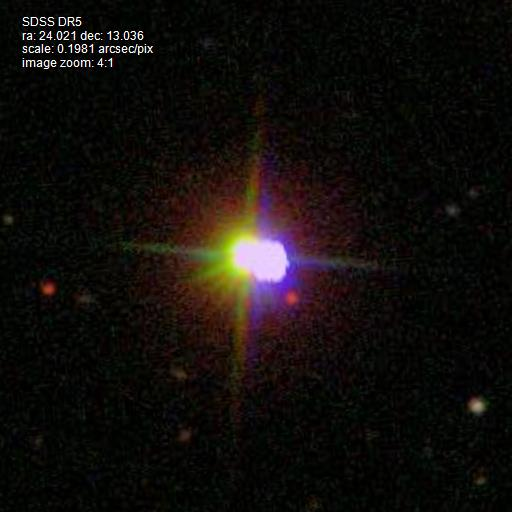
- An image of Aglaja taken by the SDSS telescope on 13 October 1999. The minor planet was 1.7 AU from Earth at the time of photography.

Discovery
- Discovered by: Robert Luther
- Discovery date: 15 September 1857

Designations
- Pronunciation: /əˈɡleɪ.ə/
- Named after: Aglaea
- Alternative designations: Aglaia
- Minor planet category: Main belt
- Adjectives: Aglajan

Orbital characteristics
- Epoch 31 December 2006 (JD 2454100.5)
- Aphelion: 488.740 million km (3.267 AU)
- Perihelion: 372.222 million km (2.488 AU)
- Semi-major axis: 430.481 million km (2.878 AU)
- Eccentricity: 0.135
- Orbital period (sidereal): 1,782.960 d (4.88 a)
- Mean anomaly: 225.007°
- Inclination: 4.985°
- Longitude of ascending node: 3.244°
- Argument of perihelion: 314.589°

Physical characteristics
- Dimensions: 141.90 ± 8.72 km (composite estimate)
- Mass: (2.74±0.18)×10^{18} kg (Note: Calculated from its standard gravitational parameter GM = 0.183±0.012 km^{3}/s^{2}.)
- Mean density: 1.10 g/cm^{3} (Note: Assuming a diameter of 168 km.)
- Synodic rotation period: 13.175 h
- Geometric albedo: 0.080
- Spectral type: C (Tholen); B (SMASSII)
- Absolute magnitude (H): 7.84

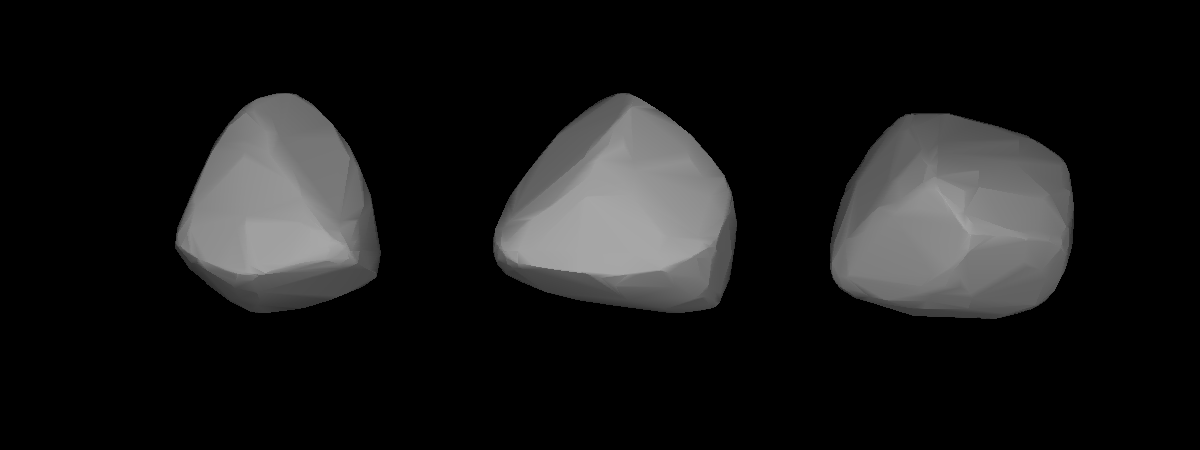
An image of 47 Aglaja made using light curves.

47 Aglaja /əˈɡleɪ.ə/ is a large, dark main belt asteroid. It was discovered by Robert Luther on 15 September 1857 from Düsseldorf. The name was chosen by the Philosophical Faculty of the University of Bonn and refers to Aglaea, one of the Charites in Greek mythology. It was rendered Aglaia in English sources into the early 20th century, as 'i' and 'j' are equivalent in Latin names and in the Latin rendering of Greek names.

Based upon its spectrum, 47 Aglaja is listed as a C-type asteroid under the Tholen classification taxonomy, indicating a carbonaceous composition. The SMASS classification system rates it as a rare B-type asteroid. There is a broad absorption feature at 1 μm that is associated with the presence of magnetite and is what gives the asteroid its blue tint.

On 16 September 1984, the star SAO 146599 was occulted by 47 Aglaja. This event was observed from 13 sites in the continental United States, allowing a cross-sectional profile to be determined. Based upon this study, the asteroid has a diameter of 136.4 ± 1.2 km. The geometric albedo calculated at the time of the occultation was 0.071 ± 0.002.

2012 photometric observations of this asteroid at the Organ Mesa Observatory in Las Cruces, New Mexico gave a light curve with a period of 13.175 ± 0.002 hours and a brightness variation of 0.09 ± 0.01 in magnitude. This result is in agreement with previous studies.
