= Monika Hansen =

German actress (1942–2025)

- Born: 9 April 1942; Germany
- Died: 26 June 2025 (aged 83); Berlin, Germany
- Occupation: Actress
- Spouse(s): Otto Sander; Rolf Becker

Monika Hansen (9 April 1942 – 26 June 2025) was a German theatre and film actress.

== Life and career ==
Hansen, daughter of the comedian Claire Schlichting, was married to the actor Rolf Becker until 1971. The marriage produced two children, Ben Becker and Meret Becker, both also actors. After the divorce, Hansen married the actor Otto Sander, with whom she remained married until his death in 2013. Hansen's older brother Jonny Buchardt was also an actor.

She received her acting training from 1959 to 1962 at the Otto Falckenberg School in Munich. After her first permanent engagement at the Theater Ulm, she then worked for ten years at the Theater Bremen under the directorship of Kurt Hübner, whom she followed to the Freie Volksbühne Berlin in 1973. Further stops in her career included the Schillertheater (Berlin) and the Schaubühne in Berlin. There she worked with Luc Bondy, Klaus Michael Grüber, and Frank-Patrick Steckel, among others. The latter brought her to the Schauspielhaus Bochum for Einar Schleef's Die Schauspieler. She also performed at the Renaissance Theater Berlin and the Staatstheater Kassel.

Hansen's film work includes around 40 film and television productions between 1971 and 2022. She worked with several directors of the New German Cinema such as Margarethe von Trotta (on The Promise), Wim Wenders (on Faraway, So Close!) and Bernhard Sinkel (on Put on Ice). In the film The Einstein of Sex (1999) by Rosa von Praunheim, she played together with her children Meret and Ben Becker and her husband Otto Sander. She made several films with the director Lars Kraume. In 2005, she appeared in the children's film A Christmoose Carol alongside Mario Adorf. On television, Hansen appeared in well-known series such as Polizeiruf 110 (three times in total), Tatort, KDD – Kriminaldauerdienst (KDD – Berlin Crime Squad), and Neues aus Uhlenbusch (News from Uhlenbusch).

Hansen last lived in Berlin. She died on 26 June 2025, at the age of 83.

== Filmography ==
- 1971: I Love You, I Kill You (Feature film) – Director: Uwe Brandner
- 1977: Rappelkiste (TV series, 1 episode)
- 1979: Feuerzeichen (TV film) – Director: Rainer Boldt
- 1980: The Moon Shines on Kylenamoe (TV film) – Director: Jan Kauenhowen
- 1980: Put on Ice (Feature film) – Director: Bernhard Sinkel
- 1980: Neues aus Uhlenbusch (TV series, 1 episode)
- 1982: Warten bis Lilli kommt (TV film) – Director: Rainer Boldt
- 1989: 10 Minuten Berlin (Short film)
- 1989: Hals über Kopf (TV series) (TV series, 1 episode)
- 1993: Faraway, So Close! (Feature film) – Director: Wim Wenders
- 1993: Durchreise – Die Geschichte einer Firma (TV series, 1 episode)
- 1994: The White Horse Inn (TV film)
- 1994: Polizeiruf 110: Totes Gleis (TV series episode) – Director: Bernd Böhlich
- 1994: The Promise (Feature film) – Director: Margarethe von Trotta
- 1995: Doppelter Einsatz (TV series, 1 episode)
- 1996: Killer Condom (Feature film) – Director: Martin Walz
- 1996, 1998: Wolffs Revier (TV series, 2 episodes, various roles)
- 1998: Polizeiruf 110: Das Wunder von Wustermark (TV series episode) – Director: Bernd Böhlich
- 1999: The Einstein of Sex (Feature film) – Director: Rosa von Praunheim
- 1999: Rosa Roth: Wintersaat (TV series episode)
- 1999: Men Are Like Chocolate (TV film)
- 2001: My Sweet Home (Feature film) – Director: Filippos Tsitos
- 2003: Tatort: Hexentanz (TV series episode)
- 2005: Polizeiruf 110: Dettmanns weite Welt (TV series episode)
- 2005: No Songs of Love (Feature film) – Director: Lars Kraume
- 2005: Unveiled (Feature film) – Director: Angelina Maccarone
- 2005: A Christmoose Carol (Feature film) – Director: Ben Verbong
- 2006: Stolberg (TV series, 1 episode)
- 2008: KDD – Kriminaldauerdienst (TV series, 2 episodes)
- 2008: The Lie (TV film) – Director: Judith Kennel
- 2009: Kaifeck Murder (Feature film) – Director: Esther Gronenborn
- 2010: SOKO Köln (TV series, 1 episode) – Director: Richard Huber
- 2011: SOKO Wismar (TV series, 1 episode)
- 2012: Großstadtrevier (TV series, 1 episode) – Director: Torsten Wacker
- 2013: My Sisters (Feature film) – Director: Lars Kraume
- 2014: Seven Deaths of a Bird – Director: Ralf Schmerberg
- 2017: King of Berlin – Director: Lars Kraume
- 2022: Rex Gildo – The Last Dance (Semi-documentary film) – Director: Rosa von Praunheim

== Radio plays ==
- 1992: Conny Lens: Ostwind – Director: Joachim Sonderhoff (crime radio play – WDR)
- 2014: Hans Zimmer (author): Johann disappears – Director: Klaus-Michael Klingsporn (children's radio play – DKultur)

== Audiobooks ==
- Solo for a Mannequin by Grieneisen. Homage to Valeska Gert, audio collage by Peter Eckhart Reichel with Monika Hansen and Gerd Wameling, duo-phon records, 2001, ISBN 3-937127-00-3.

== Awards ==
- 1994: Adolf Grimme Award for her role in Polizeiruf 110: Totes Gleis
