= Die Kinder =

- Cover of the novelisation of the series by Gavin Richards
- Genre: Thriller
- Written by: Paula Milne
- Directed by: Rob Walker
- Starring: Miranda Richardson; Frederic Forrest; Hans Kremer; Sam Cox; Derek Fowlds; Ulrich Pleitgen; Tommy Selby-Plewman
- Composer: Richard Hartley
- Country of origin: United Kingdom
- Original language: English
- No. of series: 1
- No. of episodes: 6

Production
- Producer: Michael Wearing
- Cinematography: Roger Cann
- Editor: Ardan Fisher
- Running time: 60 minutes
- Production company: BBC Studios

Original release
- Network: BBC2
- Release: 14 November – 19 December 1990

Die Kinder (The Children) is a six-part British television political thriller, written by Paula Milne and directed by Rob Walker, that first broadcast on BBC2 on 14 November 1990. The series, which starred Miranda Richardson and Frederic Forrest, follows housewife Sidonie Reiger (Richardson) as she tries to rescue her children, who have been kidnapped by her ex-husband, a former radical activist. She enlists the help of private investigator Lomax (Forrest), as they find themselves caught between her husband's past associates and an international array of security service operatives.

The series co-starred Hans Kremer, Sam Cox and Derek Fowlds. The series aired in the United States as part of PBS' Mystery! strand of programming. The series has never been released on DVD. A novelisation of the screenplay by author Gavin Richards was published on 25 October 1990, three weeks prior to broadcast.

== Cast ==
- Miranda Richardson as Sidonie Reiger
- Frederic Forrest as Lomax
- Hans Kremer as Stefan Reiger
- Sam Cox as Alan Mitchell
- Derek Fowlds as Crombie
- Ulrich Pleitgen as Gunther Beck
- Tommy Selby-Plewman as Michael Reiger
- Zara Warshal as Sabine Reiger
- Hanns Zischler as Bellenberg
- Tina Engel as Karin Muller
- Barrie Houghton as Gilmour
- Beatrice Manowski as Eva Strachen

== Episodes ==
No.	Title	Directed by	Written by	Original release date
1	"Direct Action"	Rob Walker	Paula Milne	14 November 1990
2	"Ghosts"	Rob Walker	Paula Milne	21 November 1990
3	"Hidden Agenda"	Rob Walker	Paula Milne	28 November 1990
4	"Catastrophe Theory"	Rob Walker	Paula Milne	5 December 1990
5	"The Gathering Storm"	Rob Walker	Paula Milne	12 December 1990
6	"Revolution Recycled"	Rob Walker	Paula Milne	19 December 1990
