= Helmut Griem =

German actor and director (1932–2004)

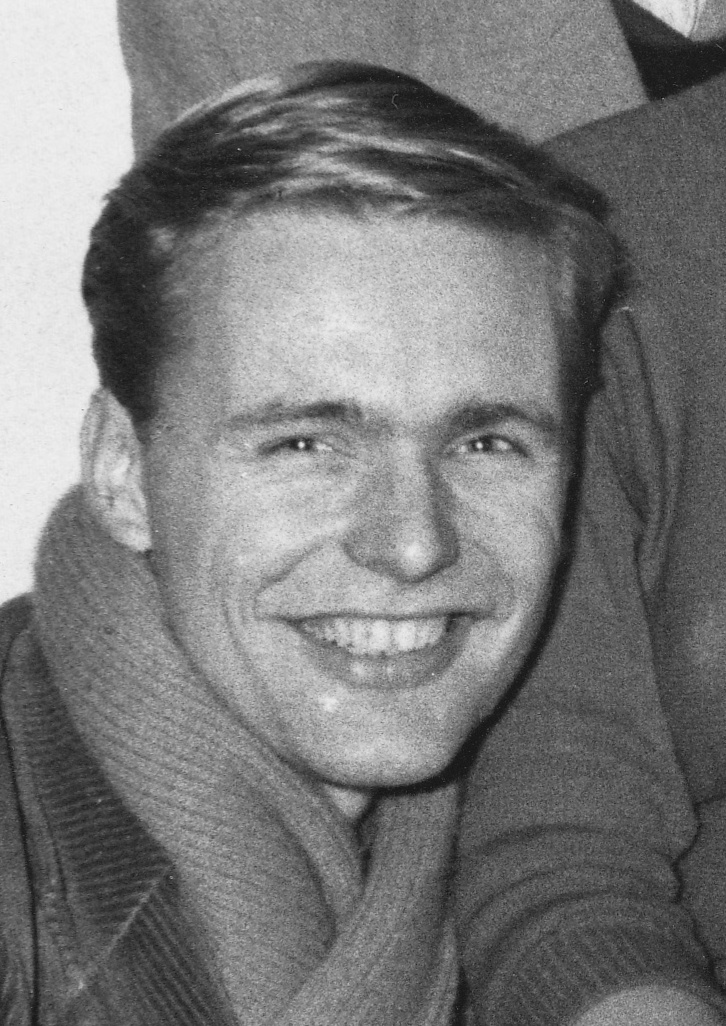
- Griem (1955)
- Born: 6 April 1932; Hamburg, Germany
- Died: 19 November 2004 (aged 72); Munich, Germany
- Occupations: Actor, theatre director
- Years active: 1956–2002

Helmut Griem (6 April 1932 – 19 November 2004) was a German film, television and stage actor, and director.

== Biography ==
Born in Hamburg, Griem was primarily a stage actor, appearing at the Thalia Theater in Hamburg, the Deutsches Schauspielhaus in Hamburg, the Burgtheater in Vienna, the Munich Kammerspiele, and finally in the Staatstheater am Gärtnerplatz, also in Munich.

Griem became well known to international audiences as the diabolical SS officer Aschenbach in The Damned. His role in the Academy Award-winning film Cabaret (1972) as the wealthy bisexual Baron Maximilian von Heune is probably his best-known international performance.

Other performances include his work in The McKenzie Break, and Ludwig and Breakthrough. His many film and TV appearances include NBC's Peter the Great as the Tsar's lifelong friend and "right hand" Alexander Menshikov, alongside Maximilian Schell. He starred in the television mini-series The Devil's Lieutenant directed by John Goldschmidt, adapted by Jack Rosenthal, and based on the novel by the Hungarian-American playwright and author Maria Fagyas (1905–1985), for Channel 4 and ZDF.

Griem performed in many classic roles from both the German and English-language repertoire. Later in his career Griem turned to theatre direction, including Long Day's Journey Into Night by Eugene O'Neill. Before his death, he had planned to direct the Botho Strauss play, Die eine und die andere (This One and The Other). Griem twice won the Bambi Award: in 1961 and in 1976.

He died in Munich in 2004, aged 72.

== Theatre ==
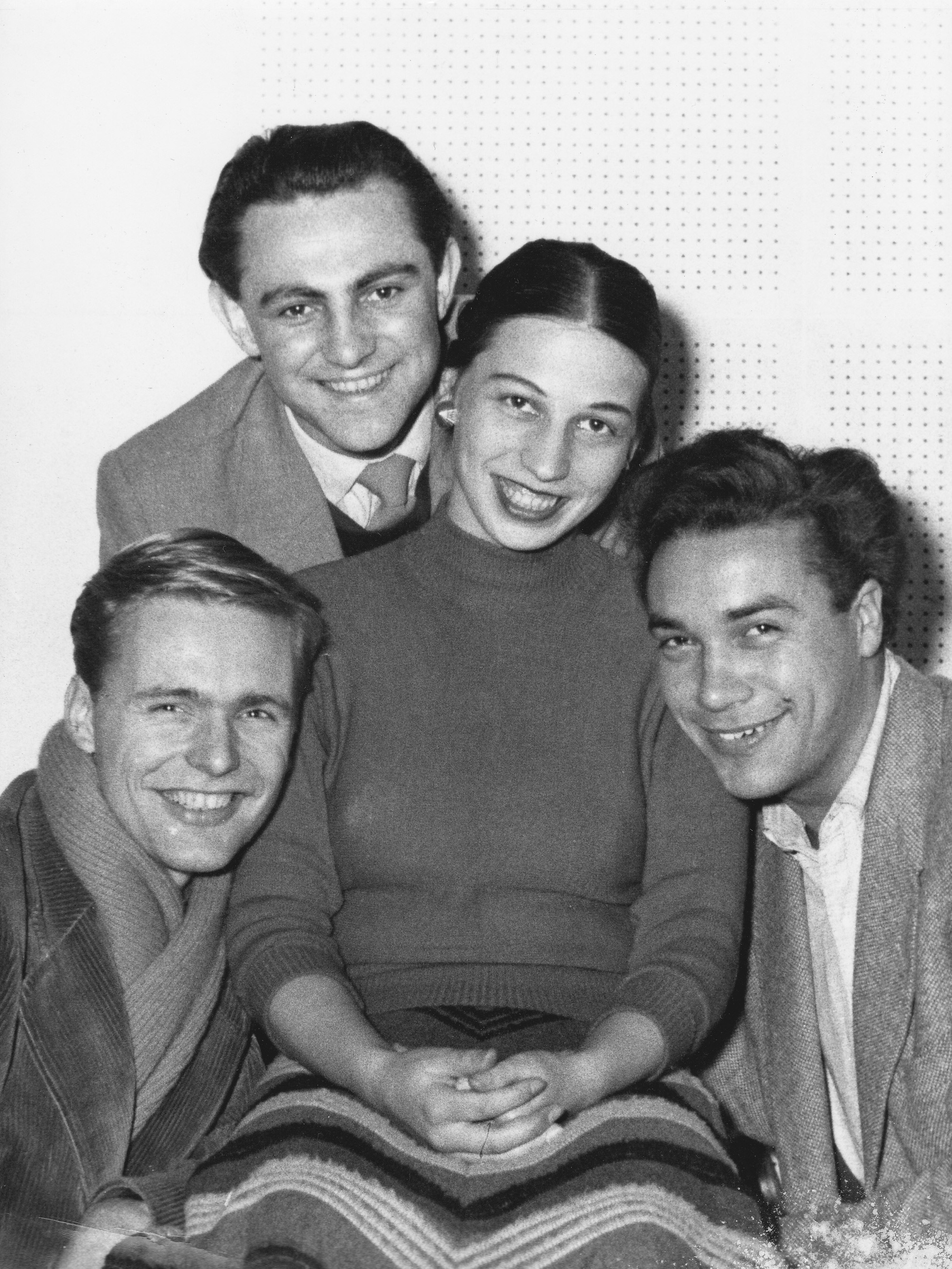
Helmut Griem (left) in 1954

Title	Author	Role	Director
Intrigue and Love	Friedrich Schiller	Ferdinand	Willi Schmidt
Leonce and Lena	Georg Büchner	Leonce	Hans Bauer
As You Like It	William Shakespeare	Orlando	Willi Schmidt
The Glass Menagerie	Tennessee Williams	Tom	Willi Schmidt
Richard II	William Shakespeare	Title Role	Hans Lietzau
The Cherry Orchard	Anton Chekhov	Lopachin	Hans Lietzau
The Philanthropist	Christopher Hampton	Philipp	Dieter Dorn
The Prince of Homburg	Heinrich von Kleist	Title Role	Hans Lietzau
The Maids	Jean Genet	Claire	Dieter Dorn
Philoctetes	Heiner Müller	Title Role	Hans Lietzau
Die Räuber	Friedrich Schiller	Karl Moor	Hans Lietzau
My Fair Lady	Lerner and Loewe	Professor Higgins	August Everding
Troilus and Cressida	William Shakespeare	Thersites	Dieter Dorn
Faust	Johann Wolfgang Goethe	Title Role	Dieter Dorn
Who's Afraid of Virginia Woolf?	Edward Albee	George	Martin Meltge

== Filmography ==
Year	Title	Role	Language	Director	With...	Notes
1960	Officer Factory	Oberleutnant Krafft	German	Frank Wisbar; Written by Hans Hellmut Kirst	Horst Frank	
1961	Girl from Hong Kong	Glenn Dierks	German	Franz Peter Wirth	Akiko Wakabayashi and Hanns Lothar	
1961	Barbara	Doctor Poul Aggersø	German	Frank Wisbar	Harriet Andersson	
1961	The Dream of Lieschen Mueller	Jan	German	Helmut Käutner	Sonja Ziemann, Martin Held and Cornelia Froboess	
1962	Oggi a Berlino (Today in Berlin)	Hans	Italian	Piero Vivarelli; Written by Piero Vivarelli, Giuseppe Isani		
1963	Because, Because of a Woman	Johann Muller	French	Michel Deville	Mylène Demongeot, Marie Laforêt and Jacques Charrier	
1968	Bel Ami	Georges Duroy	German	Helmut Käutner		TV film
1969	The Damned	Aschenbach	English	Luchino Visconti	Dirk Bogarde, Ingrid Thulin and Helmut Berger	
1970	The McKenzie Break	Kapitänleutnant Schlüter	English	Lamont Johnson	Brian Keith	
1972	Cabaret	Baron Maximilian von Heune	English	Bob Fosse	Liza Minnelli, Michael York, Joel Grey and Fritz Wepper	
1972	The Morals of Ruth Halbfass	Franz Vogelsang	German	Volker Schlöndorff	Senta Berger	
1972	Ludwig	Count Dürckheim	English	Luchino Visconti	Helmut Berger, Romy Schneider, Gert Fröbe, Trevor Howard and Silvana Mangano	
1975	Children of Rage	Dr. David Shalom	English	Arthur Allan Seidelman	Olga Georges-Picot	
1976	The Clown	Hans Schnier	German	Vojtěch Jasný; Written by Heinrich Böll	Hanna Schygulla and Hans Christian Blech	
1976	The Desert of the Tartars	Lieutenant Simeon	Italian	Valerio Zurlini	Vittorio Gassman, Laurent Terzieff, Max von Sydow, Philippe Noiret, Jean-Louis Trintignant, Fernando Rey, Giuliano Gemma and Francisco Rabal	
1976	Voyage of the Damned	Otto Schiendick	English	Stuart Rosenberg	Faye Dunaway, Oskar Werner, Lee Grant, Max von Sydow, James Mason, Malcolm McDowell, Orson Welles, Katharine Ross, Ben Gazzara, Fernando Rey, José Ferrer, Maria Schell and Julie Harris	
1978	Germany in Autumn		German	Rainer Werner Fassbinder, Volker Schlöndorff, Edgar Reitz, Alexander Kluge, et al.		
1978	The Glass Cell	Phillip Braun	German	Hans W. Geißendörfer	Brigitte Fossey and Bernhard Wicki	
1978	Mannen i skuggan	Willi Mohr	Swedish	Arne Mattsson	Slobodan Dimitrijević	
1978	Les Rendez-vous d'Anna	Heinrich Schneider	French	Chantal Akerman	Aurore Clément	
1979	Breakthrough	Major Stransky	English	Andrew V. McLaglen	Richard Burton, Robert Mitchum, Rod Steiger and Curd Jürgens	
1979	The Hamburg Syndrome	Sebastian	German	Peter Fleischmann	Fernando Arrabal	
1980	Put on Ice	Lehrer Brasch	German	Bernhard Sinkel	Ángela Molina and Martin Benrath	
1981	Malou	Martin Rethmann	German	Jeanine Meerapfel	Ingrid Caven and Ivan Desny	
1981	Sting in the Flesh	Hans	German	Heidi Genée	Barbara Lass	
1981	The Temptation	Ludwig	German	Krzysztof Zanussi	Maja Komorowska and Eva Maria Meineke	TV film
1982	The Magic Mountain	James Tienappel	German	Hans W. Geißendörfer	Christoph Eichhorn, Marie-France Pisier, Rod Steiger and Charles Aznavour	
1982	Elective Affinities	Eduard Otto	French	Claude Chabrol	Stéphane Audran	TV film
1982	La Passante du Sans-Souci	Michel Wiener	French	Jacques Rouffio	Romy Schneider and Michel Piccoli	
1984	The Devil's Lieutenant	Judge Advocate Kunze	English	John Goldschmidt	Ian Charleson, Barbara De Rossi and Claudine Auger	TV film
1986	Peter the Great	Alexander Menshikov	English	Marvin J. Chomsky, Lawrence Schiller	Maximilian Schell, Vanessa Redgrave, Laurence Olivier, Omar Sharif, Lilli Palmer, Ursula Andress, Hanna Schygulla, Elke Sommer and Trevor Howard	TV miniseries
1986	Boundaries of Time: Caspar David Friedrich	Carl Gustav Carus	German	Peter Schamoni	Sabine Sinjen and Hans Peter Hallwachs	
1987	The Second Victory	Karl Fischer	English	Gerald Thomas	Anthony Andrews, Max von Sydow, Mario Adorf and Renée Soutendijk	
1988	Faust	Faust	German	Dieter Dorn (Filmed theatre performance)	Romuald Pekny, Sunnyi Melles and Cornelia Froboess	
1989	A proposito di quella strana ragazza	Ugo De Magistris	Italian	Marco Leto	Joely Richardson	
1989	Hard Days, Hard Nights	Kronschneider	German	Horst Königstein	Rita Tushingham	
1990	The Plot to Kill Hitler	Field Marshal Erwin Rommel	English	Lawrence Schiller	Brad Davis and Ian Richardson	TV film
1990	Shooting Stars	Gutke	English	Chris Bernard	Sharon Duce and Gary McDonald	
1991	Landläufiger Tod	Judge Sonnenberg	German	Michael Schottenberg	Paulus Manker and Mercedes Echerer	TV film
1993	Charlemagne, le prince à cheval	Widukind	English	Clive Donner	Christian Brendel, Anny Duperey and Frank Finlay	TV miniseries
1993	Verlassen Sie bitte Ihren Mann!	Pertussini	German	Reinhard Schwabenitzky	Elfi Eschke	
1995	Brennendes Herz	Gustav Regler	German	Peter Patzak	Dominique Sanda, Thomas Kretschmann, Dieter Laser and John Phillip Law	
1997	The Lost Daughter	Rolf Sutter	English	Roger Cardinal	Richard Chamberlain	TV film
2000	Lourdes	Auguste La Fontaine	Italian	Lodovico Gasparini	Alessandro Gassmann, Stefania Rocca, Andréa Ferréol and Sydne Rome	TV film
2001	Death Train to the Pacific	Oscar	German	Hans Werner	Anja Kling	TV film
