= Dietrich Lohmann =

German cinematographer (1943–1997)

- Born: March 9, 1943; Schnepfenthal, Waltershausen, Thuringia, Germany
- Died: November 13, 1997 (aged 54); Duarte, California, USA
- Occupation: Cinematographer

Dietrich Lohmann, (9 March 1943 – 13 November 1997) was a German cinematographer.

He was born in Schnepfenthal, Waltershausen, Thuringia, Germany. He studied at the Staatliche Fachschule für Optik und Fototechnik in Berlin. After graduating he entered Olympia-Film in Munich and worked with Thomas Mauch, and he became a key cinematographer of New German Cinema. He is prominent for his collaboration with director Rainer Werner Fassbinder.

He went to the US in 1988, and photographed Hollywood films such as The Innocent, Color of Night, A Couch in New York, The Peacemaker and Deep Impact.

He won at the German Film Awards in 1970, and at the American Society of Cinematographers Awards in 1989.

On November 13, 1997, Lohmann died from leukemia, aged 54.

The film Deep Impact was dedicated to Lohmann's memory.

== Filmography ==
- Artists Under the Big Top: Perplexed (1968) camera assistant
- Cardillac (1969)
- Love Is Colder Than Death (1969)
- Katzelmacher (1969)
- Why Does Herr R. Run Amok? (1970)
- The American Soldier (1970)
- Rio das Mortes (1971)
- Pioneers in Ingolstadt (1971)
- The Merchant of Four Seasons (1971)
- Eight Hours Don't Make a Day (1972–1973) TV series
- Effi Briest (1972)
- Ludwig: Requiem for a Virgin King (1972)
- The Last Days of Gomorrah (1974, TV film)
- Karl May (1974)
- Hitler: A Film from Germany (1977)
- Germany in Autumn (1978)
- The Tailor from Ulm (1978)
- Kassbach – Ein Porträt (1979)
- Der Sturz (1979)
- Put on Ice (1980)
- The Confessions of Felix Krull (1982, TV series)
- Tramps (1983)
- Väter und Söhne – Eine deutsche Tragödie (1986)
- The Great Escape II: The Untold Story (1988)
- War and Remembrance (1989) TV miniseries, 1 episode
- The Rose and the Jackal (1990) TV movie
- Wedlock (1991)
- Ted & Venus (1991) TV movie
- Knight Moves (1992)
- Salt on Our Skin (1992)
- The Innocent (1993)
- Me and the Kid (1993)
- Color of Night (1994)
- A Couch in New York (1996)
- Snakes and Ladders (1996)
- The Way We Are (1997) aka Quiet Days in Hollywood
- The Peacemaker (1997)
- Deep Impact (1998)
