= The Confessions of Felix Krull (TV series) =

- Genre: Adventure
- Based on: The Confessions of Felix Krull by Thomas Mann
- Written by: Alf Brustellin; Bernhard Sinkel
- Directed by: Bernhard Sinkel
- Composer: Nikos Mamangakis
- Countries of origin: Austria; France; West Germany
- Original language: German
- No. of series: 1
- No. of episodes: 5

Production
- Producers: Peter Märthesheimer; Ian Warren
- Cinematography: Dietrich Lohmann
- Running time: 60 minutes

Original release
- Network: ZDF (West Germany)
- Release: 24 January – 14 February 1982

The Confessions of Felix Krull (German: Bekenntnisse des Hochstaplers Felix Krull) is a 1982 adventure television series based on the novel of the same title by Thomas Mann. It was shot as a co-production between Austria, France and West Germany.

The story had previously been adapted into a 1957 film Confessions of Felix Krull.

== Main cast ==
- John Moulder-Brown as Felix Krull
  - Oliver Wehe as Felix Krull (Young)
- Magali Noël as Mme Houpflé
- Fernando Rey as Professor Kuckuck
- Rita Tushingham as Mrs. Twentyman
- Joss Ackland as Mr. Twentyman
- Hans Heinz Moser as Herr Sturzil
- Pierre Doris as Detective
- Alain Flick as Monsieur Machatschek
- Klaus Schwarzkopf as Father Krull
- Daphne Wagner as Mother Krull
- Mareike Carrière as Olympia
- Franziska Walser as Genoveva
- Rolf Zacher as Stanko
- Vera Tschechowa as Maria Pia
- Georgia Slowe as Zouzou
- Kurt Raab as Sally Meerschaum
- Nikolaus Paryla as Schimmelpreester
- Despina Pajanou as Rosza
- James Cossins as Lord Kilmarnock
- Marie Colbin as Zaza
- Benno Hoffmann
- Ulrich Beiger
- Loriot as Thomas Mann (cameo)

== Bibliography ==
- Bock, Hans-Michael & Bergfelder, Tim. The Concise CineGraph. Encyclopedia of German Cinema. Berghahn Books, 2009.
