= Peter Ehrlich =

German actor

- Born: Peter Ehrlich; 25 March 1933; Leipzig, Germany
- Died: 26 July 2015 (aged 82)
- Website: http://www.agentur-delaberg.de/ehrlich.htm

Peter Ehrlich (25 March 1933 – 26 July 2015) was a German television actor.

== Filmography ==
Year	Title	Role	Notes
1962	He Can't Stop Doing It	O'Leary	
1963	Der Sittlichkeitsverbrecher		
1964	Emil and the Detectives	Müller	
1967	Flucht ohne Ausweg	Paul	TV miniseries, 3 episodes
1968	Ein Mann namens Harry Brent	James Wallace	TV miniseries, 3 episodes
1970	Hauser's Memory	Kucera	TV film
1970	Christmas Not Just Once a Year	Franz	TV film
1971	The Three Faces of Tamara Bunke	Vargas	TV film
1972	The Morals of Ruth Halbfass	Erich Halbfass	
1974	Eintausend Milliarden	Maahs	
1975	Berlinger	Johannes Roeder	
1979	A Man, a Woman, and a Bank	Jerry	
1979-1993	Derrick	Kronau / Kuhnert sen. / Martin Koldau / Albert Rasko / Walter Hagemann / Oskar Kerk	TV series, 6 episodes
1983-2002	Tatort	Batscho Reinhard / Sakowski	TV series, 2 episodes
1983	Die schwarze Spinne		
1992	Zürich - Transit	Studer	
1996	Diebinnen (Women Robbers)	Karl Herzog	
1996	Deutschlandlied	Baron von Hellnstein	TV miniseries
1999	Der Einstein des Sex	Richard	Uncredited
