= Red spot =

Red spot or redspot may refer to:

- Great Red Spot, a persistent anticyclonic vortex on the south border of the South Equatorial belt of Jupiter
  - Red Spot Jr., a red storm in Jupiter's southern hemisphere similar to, though smaller than, the Great Red Spot
- Red Spot (G.I. Joe), a fictional character in the G.I. Joe universe
- The Red Spot, a German-Japanese film
- Zesius chrysomallus, a butterfly commonly called the redspot
- Red Spot, an Irish whiskey.

== See also ==
- Port-wine stain
