= Confessions of Felix Krull (1957 film) =

1957 film

- Directed by: Kurt Hoffmann
- Written by: Thomas Mann (novel); Erika Mann; Robert Thoeren
- Produced by: Hans Abich; Rolf Thiele
- Starring: Horst Buchholz; Liselotte Pulver; Ingrid Andree
- Cinematography: Friedl Behn-Grund
- Edited by: Caspar van den Berg
- Music by: Hans-Martin Majewski
- Production company: Filmaufbau
- Distributed by: Europa-Filmverleih
- Release date: 25 April 1957
- Running time: 107 minutes
- Country: West Germany
- Language: German

Confessions of Felix Krull (German: Bekenntnisse des Hochstaplers Felix Krull, lit. 'Confessions of the Imposter Felix Krull') is a 1957 West German comedy and drama film directed by Kurt Hoffmann and starring Horst Buchholz, Liselotte Pulver, and Ingrid Andree. It is based on the 1954 novel of the same title by Thomas Mann. The story was later made into a 1982 television series The Confessions of Felix Krull. It was shot at the Wandsbek Studios in Hamburg and on location in Lisbon. The film's sets were designed by the art director Robert Herlth. The film won a Golden Globe Award for Best Foreign Language Film at the 15th Golden Globe Awards and Best Feature-Length Film at the 1957 Filmband in Gold awards. Bucholz was awarded the 1958 Bambi Award for his performance. Mann's novel was made into a movie again in 2021.

== Plot summary ==
Felix Krull (Buchholz) uses his acting skills to successfully get himself discharged from the military by falsely portraying himself as unfit for service. He begins working at a hotel in Paris and then begins travelling the world under the pseudonym of Marquis de Venosta, styling himself as a lord. He forms a romantic relationship with the real Marquis de Venosta's lover, Zaza (Pulver). He becomes acquainted with Professor Kuckuck (Dahlke) during his travels and charms both his daughter Zouzou (Andree) and his wife Maria Pia (Steppat), as well as Madame Houpflé (Nicoletti). Because of the disappearance of Zaza, the real Marquis de Venosta (Schmidt) is suspected of murder. de Venosta's parents convince the authorities that Krull is the real Marquis, and he is imprisoned. He convinces Kuckuck to help him fake his own death. The film concludes with him steaming away with Zaza.

== Main cast ==
- Horst Buchholz as Felix Krull
- Liselotte Pulver as Zaza
- Ingrid Andree as Zouzou Kuckuck
- Susi Nicoletti as Madame Houpflé
- Paul Dahlke as Professor Kuckuck
- Ilse Steppat as Maria Pia Kuckuck
- Walter Rilla as Lord Kilmarnock
- Alice Treff as Venostas Mutter
- Peer Schmidt as Marquis de Venosta
- Karl Ludwig Lindt as Venostas Vater
- Werner Hinz as Stabsarzt
- Heinz Reincke as Stanko
- Paul Henckels as Schimmelpreester
- Heidi Brühl as Eleanor
- Ralf Wolter as Gestellungspflichtiger
- Heinz Klevenow as Machatschek
- Ehmi Bessel as Felix Krulls' Mutter
- Herbert Weicker as Hurtado
- Robert Meyn as 1. Polizeibeamter
- Jo Herbst as Bob
- Günther Jerschke as 2. Polizeibeamter
- Florent Antony as Kriminalbeamter
- Martin Rosenstiel as Jean-Pierre

== Bibliography ==
- Bock, Hans-Michael & Bergfelder, Tim. The Concise CineGraph. Encyclopedia of German Cinema. Berghahn Books, 2009.
