= Ein Lied von Liebe und Tod =

- Directed by: Rolf Schübel
- Written by: Ruth Toma; Rolf Schübel
- Produced by: Richard Schöps
- Starring: Erika Marozsán; Joachim Król; Ben Becker; Rolf Becker; Ilse Zielstorff; Stefano Dionisi
- Cinematography: Edward Kłosiński
- Music by: Detlef Friedrich Petersen
- Release date: 21 October 1999 (Germany)
- Running time: 112 minutes
- Countries: Germany, Hungary
- Languages: German; Hungarian

Ein Lied von Liebe und Tod (Gloomy Sunday – A Song of Love and Death, Hungarian: Szomorú vasárnap) is a 1999 film, a German/Hungarian co-production.

Although the movie centers on a romantic love triangle with tragic consequences, it has a strong historical background, set in Hungary during World War II. The film is based on the novel by Nick Barkow, co-written and directed by Rolf Schübel and tells a fictional story connected to the creation of the infamous song "Gloomy Sunday". Starring are Joachim Król (László, Jewish restaurant owner), Stefano Dionisi (András, a pianist who creates "Gloomy Sunday"), Erika Marozsán (Ilona, waitress and László's and later András' lover) and Ben Becker (Hans Wieck, a German businessman who becomes an SS officer).

== Plot summary ==
In the present day, German industrialist Hans Wieck returns to Budapest with his family on the occasion of his 80th birthday, having been stationed there during World War II. During dinner at his favorite restaurant, Szabó's, Hans regales his family and friends with stories of his many visits to the restaurant before and during the war. As he relishes his favorite dish, "Beef Rolls" he suddenly collapses with the song "Gloomy Sunday" being played, at his request, by two musicians. As he dies he sees a portrait of a beautiful woman taken many years before. The film then flashes back to Budapest during the late 1930s.

Restaurant owner László Szabó (a Jew by birth) and his beautiful lover and waitress, Ilona (the woman in the photograph) hire a young pianist, András, to play in their restaurant. András falls in love with Ilona and she with him, though she continues to sleep with László. András is inspired to write the song "Gloomy Sunday" for Ilona's birthday, the same night that a young Hans (who also shares the same birthday) takes the picture of her and asks her to marry him, though she refuses him. Later that night Hans tries to commit suicide by jumping into the Danube, but László saves him and Hans returns to Germany. The resulting song "Gloomy Sunday" is recorded and though very popular at first soon becomes feared by the public for its melancholy melody which seems to trigger a series of suicides. András comes to regret writing the song and nearly attempts to kill himself but is stopped by Ilona and László before he can take a small vial of poison. András, László, and Ilona form a tenuous relationship. It has its problems, as articulated by László to Ilona during an argument he is having with András in front of her: "Easy for you, you've got all you need. You have two men, and we each have only half a woman."

During Operation Panzerfaust, the Nazis invade Hungary and Hans returns as an SS officer responsible for organizing the deportation of Budapest's Jews to the death camps. Secretly, he saves the wealthiest Jews and smuggles them out of Occupied Europe in exchange for substantial bribes, including both goods and money. One night at the restaurant Hans brings a fellow SS officer to Szabó's and insists that András play his fateful composition. András refuses but is compelled to do so when Ilona begins to sing the words of the song, something she has told him she would never do unless they were alone. When the song is over András kills himself by grabbing Hans's pistol and shooting himself in the head.

After they bury András, László and Ilona pledge their love to each other and László puts the restaurant in her name to keep it from being confiscated by the Nazis. At Ilona's request, Hans promises to protect László from being rounded up for "special treatment". However, shortly before the Battle of Budapest, László is rounded up and sent to the railway station to be sent to the death camps. Ilona hurries to Hans' headquarters to ask him to intervene, which he promises to do, making it clear that she must first sleep with him. A tearful Ilona submits, but Hans later reneges on the bargain, passing László by at the station and saving another Jew whose family had already paid him off. The flashback ends with the revelation of Ilona's pregnancy as she "speaks" to András at his grave, leaving the audience unsure as to who is the child's father.

In the present, media reporters are paying tribute to the deceased Hans, as he is being put into the casket and driven away in a hearse. Ironically, Hans Wieck is now remembered not only as a wealthy industrialist but also as a Righteous Among the Nations who saved "a thousand Hungarian Jews" during the war. In the closing scene of the film, the middle-aged waiter at Szabó's pours two glasses of champagne and returns to the kitchen, where his elderly mother (Ilona) is washing out András' now empty bottle of poison. Her son congratulates her on her birthday and the two embrace as the song "Gloomy Sunday" plays in the background.

== Cast ==
- Erika Marozsán as Ilona Várnai
- Joachim Król as László Szabó
- Ben Becker as the young Hans Wieck
- Rolf Becker as the old Hans Wieck
- Ilse Zielstorff as Mrs Wieck
- Stefano Dionisi as András Aradi
- András Bálint as Ilona's son

== Reception ==
Film critic Roger Ebert awarded the film three out of four stars, calling it "complicated and heartbreaking" but "imperfect".

The Academy Cinema in Christchurch, New Zealand screened the film every night for almost ten years, from its opening until the Christchurch earthquakes of February 2011.

== Awards ==
- Deutscher Filmpreis 2000: Best Screenplay
- Bavarian Film Awards 2000: Best Director, Best Cinematography
