= Otto Sander =

German actor (1941–2013)

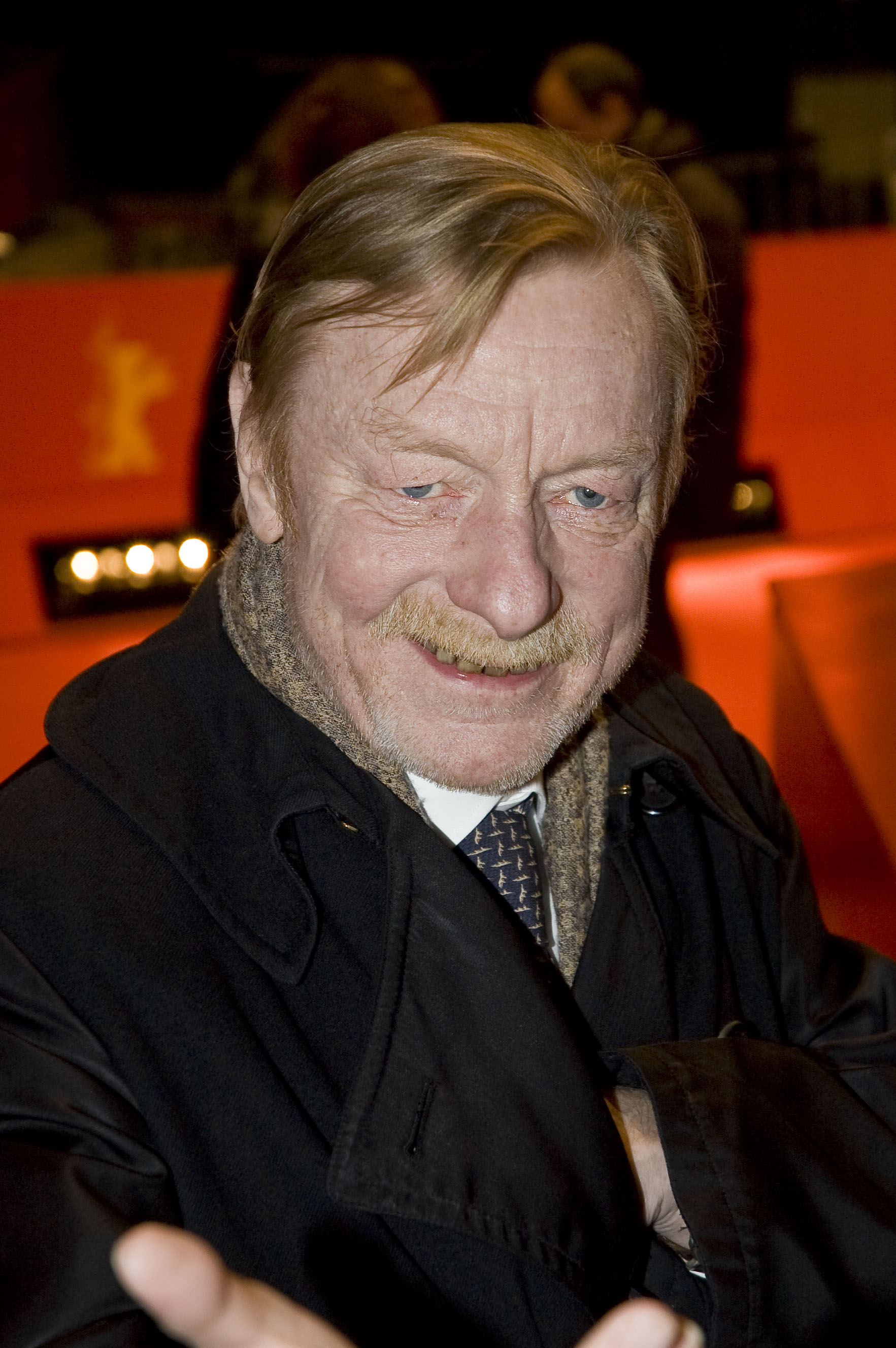
- Sander in 2008 at the 58th Berlin International Film Festival
- Born: 30 June 1941; Hanover, Germany
- Died: 12 September 2013 (aged 72); Berlin, Germany
- Occupation: Actor
- Years active: 1964–2013
- Relatives: Chris Sander (brother)

Otto Sander (German: [ˈɔtoː ˈzandɐ]; 30 June 1941 – 12 September 2013) was a German film, theater, and voice actor.

== Life ==
=== Education and early career ===
Sander grew up in Kassel, where he graduated in 1961 from the Friedrichgymnasium. After leaving school, he spent his military service in 1961/62 with the Bundesmarine and left as reserve fenrik. Sander then studied theatre science, history of art and philosophy. In 1965, he made his acting debut at the Düsseldorfer chamber plays. After his first film work in the same year, he abandoned his studies in 1967 and went to Munich to become a full-time actor.

=== Theatre ===
His career is closely connected with the Schaubühne theatre in Berlin under the direction of Peter Stein. From 1980 onwards, Sander appeared on several of Berlin's theatre stages, among others at the Schillertheater in 1981, at the Freie Volksbühne in 1985 and in 1989 at the Komödie am Kurfürstendamm. More recently, he starred in Hauptmann von Köpenick at the Schauspielhaus Bochum (2004).

=== Film ===
Among his best-known film roles are the angel Cassiel in Wings of Desire and its sequel Faraway, So Close! by Wim Wenders, and a shell-shocked U-boat commander, Kapitänleutnant Philipp Thomsen, in Wolfgang Petersen's Das Boot. Sander also appeared in The Tin Drum (1979) as a trumpeter and in Comedian Harmonists, a biopic about the musical group of the same name. He also played a professor in the movie The Promise about the division of Berlin by the wall. In 1999, he played a role in Rosa von Praunheim's movie The Einstein of Sex.

In 1990, he was a member of the Jury at the 40th Berlin International Film Festival.

=== Voice acting ===
Because of his warm, strong voice, which earned him the sobriquet "The Voice" (the English term is used), he has been used frequently as narrator for television documentaries, and numerous talking books in the 1990s.

=== Personal life and death ===
He was married to the actress Monika Hansen and was stepfather to the actors Ben Becker and Meret Becker. He had two brothers, the lawyer Adolf Sander, the scientist Chris Sander, and a sister, the book dealer Marianne Sander.

Sander died, aged 72, in Berlin on 12 September 2013. No cause of death was given, though he had been diagnosed with cancer several years before his death.

== Filmography ==
=== As actor ===
Year	Title	Role	Notes
1970	Don't Fumble, Darling	Revoluzzer Otto	
1974	One or the Other of Us	Rulle	
1975	Lehmanns Erzählungen	Lehmann	TV film
1975	Meine Sorgen möcht' ich haben	Harald Bornemann	
1976	Summerfolk	Pjotr Suslov	
1976	The Marquise of O	Der Bruder, Der Forstmeister	
1976	Vier gegen die Bank	Eberhard Winter	TV film
1979	The Tin Drum	Musiker Meyn	
1980	Palermo or Wolfsburg	Prosecutor	
1980	The Cause of the Crime	Anton Seiler	TV film
1981	Strike Back	Kowalski	
1981	Das Boot	Phillip Thomsen	
1981	The Man in Pyjamas	Rudi	
1981	In the Land of Cockaigne	Kaflisch	TV film
1982	Who's Crazy, Doc?	Number Seven	
1984	Der Mord mit der Schere	Inspector Spalt	Short
1986	Rosa Luxemburg	Karl Liebknecht	
1986	Miko: From the Gutter to the Stars	Kreditberater Grop	
1986	Wahnfried	Richard Wagner	
1986	Boundaries of Time: Caspar David Friedrich	Gerichtsgehilfe	
1987	Wings of Desire	Cassiel	
1988	The Case of Mr. Spalt	Otto Spalt	
1989	The Break	Lubowitz	
1990	Time of Vengeance	Robert	
1990	Vorwärts	Backward Pedestrian	Short
1991	Amaurose	Amaurose	
1992	Lyrische Suite. Das untergehende Vaterland		
1993	Inge, April und Mai	Inges Vater	
1993	Faraway, So Close!	Cassiel	
1993	The Movie Teller	Salzmann	
1994	Hölderlin-Comics	Friedrich Hölderlin - Elder	
1994	Movie Days	Maður á hesti	
1994	Three Sisters	Vershinin	
1994	The Promise	Professor Lorenz	
1996	Killer Condom	Mr. Higgins	
1996	Conversation with the Beast	Hitler double	
1996	Truck Stop		Short
1997	Comedian Harmonists	Bruno Levy	
1998	Der Traum von der Freiheit	Anton Melbye	
1998	Am I Beautiful?	David	
1999	Men Are Like Chocolate	Father Lano	TV film
1999	Girls Under Investigation	Baldur Meixner	
1999	Der Einstein des Sex	Prof. Steinach	
2000	Marlene	Bühnenmanager	
2000	Les Misérables	Monseigneur Bienvenu	TV miniseries
2001	Sass	Vater Sass	
2002	Tödliches Vertrauen	Bernd Kortens	TV film
2003	Donau, Duna, Dunaj, Dunav, Dunarea	Franz	
2007	Der kleine König Macius – Der Film	Erasmus	Voice
2007	The Heart Is a Dark Forest	Helmut	
2010	Life Is Too Long	Guest	
2012	Die Schuld der Erben	Leonhard Asmussen	TV film
2012	Fly Away	Eckehardt Tiedgen	

=== As Narrator ===
Year	Title	Notes
1983	A Love in Germany	
1990	Werner – Beinhart!	
1993	The Olympic Summer	
2001	100 Pro	
2003	Werner – Gekotzt wird später!	
2006	Perfume: The Story of a Murderer	
2008	Krabat	
