= Put on Ice =

1980 film

- Directed by: Bernhard Sinkel
- Written by: Alf Brustellin; Bernhard Sinkel
- Produced by: Alf Brustellin; Bernhard Sinkel; Joachim von Vietinghoff
- Starring: Helmut Griem
- Cinematography: Dietrich Lohmann
- Edited by: Annette Dorn
- Release date: May 1980
- Running time: 88 minutes
- Country: Germany
- Language: German

Put on Ice (German: Kaltgestellt) is a 1980 German thriller film directed by Bernhard Sinkel. It was entered into the 1980 Cannes Film Festival.

== Cast ==
- Helmut Griem – Lehrer Brasch
- Martin Benrath – V-Mann Körner
- Ángela Molina – Franziska Schwarz
- Friedhelm Ptok – Herr Sokolowski
- Hans-Günter Martens – Herr Schröder
- Meret Becker – Anna
- Helga Koehler – Juliane Brasch
- Frank Schendler – Kapuste
- Thomas Kufahl – Schindler
- Peter Lustig – Schulleiter
- Hermann Steza
- Rudolf Unger
- Gerhard von Halem
- Jürgen Bieske
- Monika Hansen
- Michael Brennicke
- Michael Duffek
