= Heidy Forster =

Swiss-German actress (1930–2023)

- Born: 6 September 1930; Basel, Switzerland
- Died: 2 May 2023 (aged 92); Munich, Bavaria, Germany
- Occupation: Actress
- Employers: Schauspielhaus Zürich; Munich Kammerspiele

Heidy Forster (6 September 1930 – 2 May 2023) was a Swiss-German actress.

== Biography ==
Forster started working at the Schauspielhaus Zürich and in the 1970s, she toured abroad with Franz Xaver Kroetz. From 1981 to 1999, she was involved with the Residenztheater in Munich, where she studied alongside Reschii Greesa, Amélie Niermeyer, Anselm Webe and Hans Neuenfels. She worked at the Munich Kammerspiele. She was known for Vorletzter Abschied in 2005, Dällebach Kari in 1970 and Der 42. Himmel in 1962.

Forster died in Munich on 2 May 2023, at the age of 91.

== Filmography ==
- 1968: Unruhige Töchter
- 1979: Der Sturz
- 1984: Der eiserne Weg
- 1986: Tatort: Freunde
- 1995: Drei Tage im April
- 1996: Tatort: Aida
- 1997–2015: SOKO München (TV series)
- 2000: Vom Küssen und vom Fliegen
- 2001: Tatort: Und dahinter liegt New York
- 2002: Tatort: Bienzle und der Tag der Rache
- 2003: Mensch Mutter
- 2005: Rosenstiehl
- 2006: Vitus
- 2008: Bella Block – Falsche Liebe
- 2010: Lotta & die alten Eisen
- 2010: Notruf Hafenkante (TV series, episode Tomb Raider)
