= Killer Condom =

1996 film by Martin Walz

- Theatrical release poster
- German: Kondom des Grauens
- Directed by: Martin Walz
- Screenplay by: Ralf König; Martin Walz
- Based on: Kondom des Grauens and Bis auf die Knochen by Ralf König
- Produced by: Ralph S. Dietrich; Erwin C. Dietrich; Harald Reichebner
- Starring: Udo Samel; Peter Lohmeyer; Iris Berben; Marc Richter; Leonard Lansink; Meret Becker; Hella von Sinnen
- Cinematography: Alexander Honisch
- Edited by: Simone Klier
- Music by: Emil Viklický
- Production companies: Ascot Film; ECCO Film; MBG
- Distributed by: Ascot Filmverleih
- Release dates: 29 August 1996 (Germany and Switzerland)
- Running time: 107 minutes
- Countries: Germany; Switzerland
- Language: German
- Box office: 433,000 admissions (Germany)

Killer Condom (German: Kondom des Grauens, lit. 'Condom of Horror') is a 1996 action comedy horror film directed by Martin Walz from a screenplay he co-wrote with Ralf König, based on the comic books Kondom des Grauens and Bis auf die Knochen (Down to the Bones) by König.

It was distributed in the United States and Canada by Troma Entertainment, which promoted the film at the Cannes Film Festival with the help of "a six-foot-long fanged condom".

== Plot ==
In the seedy parts of New York City, gay NYPD detective Luigi Mackeroni is investigating a series of bizarre attacks at the Hotel Quickie in which male guests have all had their penises mysteriously bitten off. While at the hotel, he enlists the services of a gigolo named Billy and invites him up to the crime scene. When the two men are about to engage in sex, a carnivorous living condom interrupts them and bites off Mackeroni's right testicle.

Now on a personal vendetta, Mackeroni begins his quest to not only bring a stop to the rash of condom attacks, but also to face his true feelings toward Billy the gigolo.

== Cast ==
- Udo Samel as Luigi Mackeroni
- Peter Lohmeyer as Sam Hanks
- Iris Berben as Dr. Doris Riffleson
- Leonard Lansink as Babette (Bob Miller)
- Marc Richter as Billy
- Evelyn Künneke (credited as Evelyn Künnecke) as Forensic Doctor
- Hella von Sinnen as Detective Sally
- Heribert Sasse as Secret Service Man
- Meret Becker as Phyllis Higgins
- Gerd Wameling as Her Teacher
- Henning Schlüter as Robinson
- Ron Williams as Chief of Police
- Otto Sander as Mr. Higgins
- Monika Hansen as Mrs. Higgins
- Gode Benedix as Policeman O'Brian
- Adriana Altaras as Tourist

== Reception ==
At the time of its 1998 U.S. theatrical release, New York Times reviewer Lawrence Van Gelder said that this Troma release had "a level of deadpan humor considerably above the company's usual adolescent subnorm", and that in addition to the usual gore, the film "also deals with dislocation, urban anomie, love and tolerance". On the other hand, Los Angeles Times critic Kevin Thomas called it a "strained, tedious sex-horror comedy that doesn't travel well".

Otto Sander's "manic" performance in this "cult classic" has been cited as a "good example of his comic gifts". In an essay entitled "When Condoms Go Bad: From Safe Sex to Five Microns to Killer Condom", film critic Thuy Daojensen wrote that the film, despite its "third rate special effects", provides "comic relief while reflecting tension and anxiety over sexual activity for procreation versus merely for pleasure."

== Home media ==
The film was restored in 4K resolution from its 35mm original camera negative and released on Blu-ray by Vinegar Syndrome in 2023.
