= Wilsberg =

German TV series

- Created by: Jürgen Kehrer
- Starring: Leonard Lansink; Heinrich Schafmeister; Oliver Korittke; Ina Paule Klink; Rita Russek; Roland Jankowsky
- Country of origin: Germany
- No. of episodes: 86

Production
- Running time: 90 Minutes

Original release
- Network: ZDF
- Release: 20 February 1995

Wilsberg is a German TV series based on novels about the fictional private detective Georg Wilsberg. A first TV episode was aired in 1995, five years after the release of the first novel, starring Joachim Król. Since the second episode (aired more than three years later), Leonard Lansink has been starring as Georg Wilsberg.

== Synopsis ==
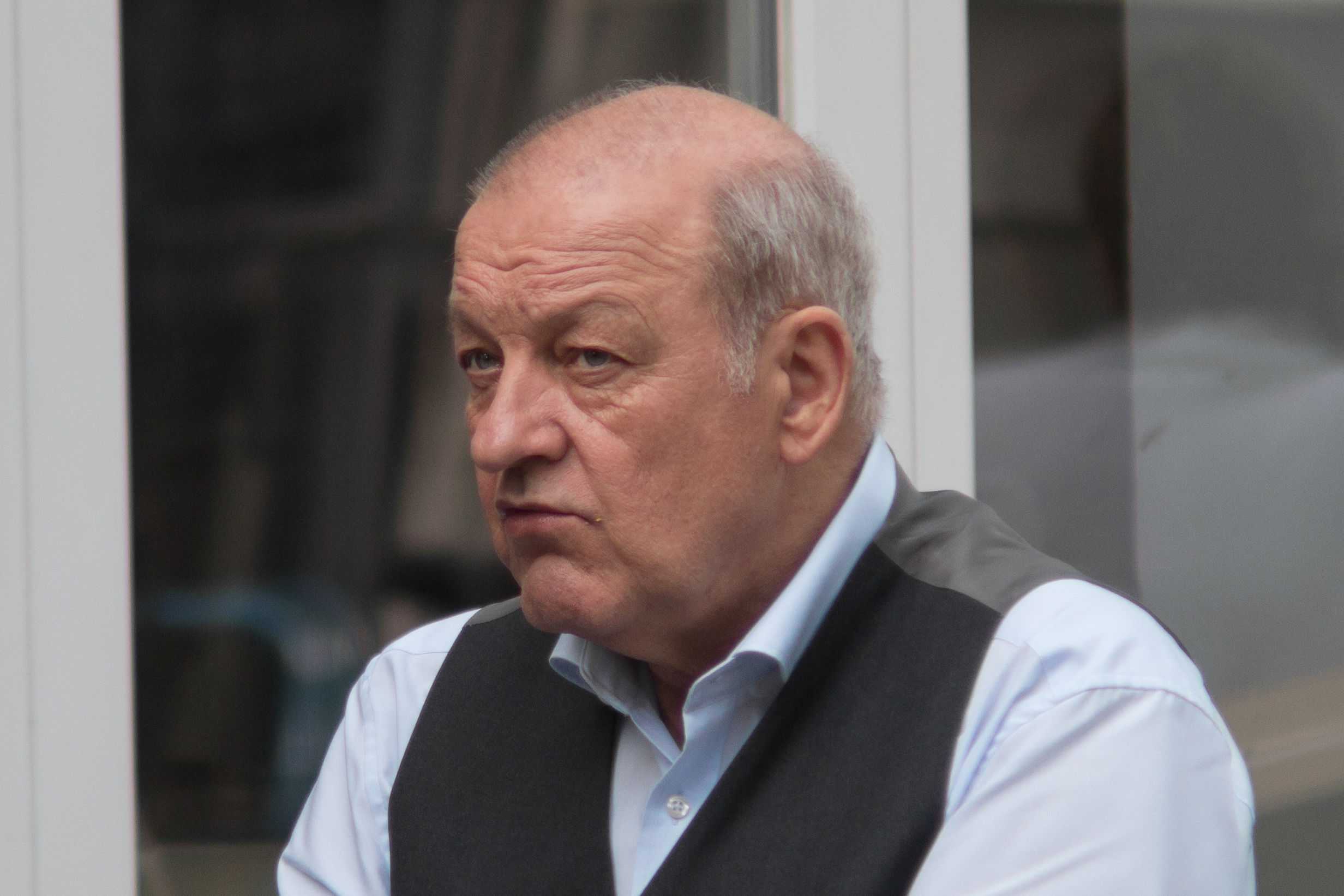
Leonard Lansink starring as Georg Wilsberg

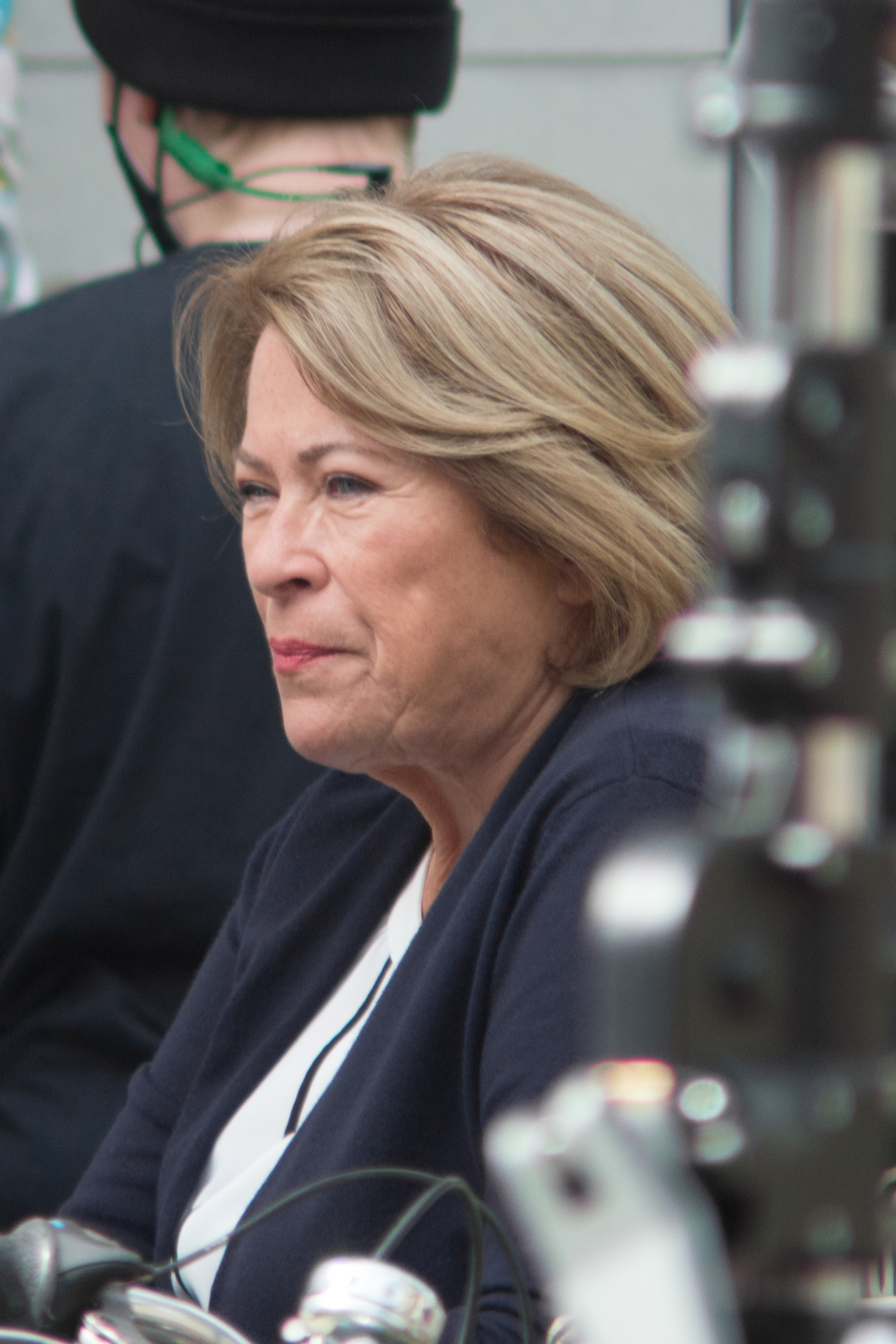
Rita Russek starring as Anna Springer

Georg Wilsberg, a sturdy man in his late fifties, runs a bookshop for antiquarian books in the city of Münster, and works on a sideline as a private detective. Both jobs mix very well. He purchases whole libraries if he can, preferably striking bargains by buying the bequest of a recently deceased. Wilsberg has a business card which gives away his side job, so if there are any doubts concerning the circumstances of the death, the relatives are inclined to employ him. Other customers appreciate the chance to hire a private detective discreetly by pretending they are just looking for rare books when they visit him. Wilsberg investigates cases all over Münster and its outskirts. Since he is permanently short of money, he does not own a car and has to borrow one from his friends, or even steal one, as a running gag. In his investigations, he does not care much about legal regulations, so he frequently burgles private homes in search of evidence and gets arrested.

Other characters are:

Ekki
Ekkehard Talkötter is an official tax inspector whose access to the tax data of anyone often supplies valuable evidence. He is Wilsberg's best friend. His character is of a shy, hesitant, unsteady manner, and perfectly complements Wilsberg's foolhardy ways.

Alex
Alexandra Holtkamp is Wilsberg's niece and goddaughter. She works as a solicitor, which is helpful when Wilsberg gets arrested for burglarizing suspects' homes.

Anna
Anna Springer, a police officer of same age as Wilsberg, is the DCI of the Münster murder squad. Privately, she tends to like Wilsberg, whose hints are often helpful, but in business, the two of them keep getting in each other's way in their (mostly independent) investigations, and on each other's nerves. Their humorous love-hate relationship is a main point of the whole plot.

Overbeck
Everybody calls Anna's assistant inspector by his last name only. He considers himself cool and ingenious and loves to show off with his sunglasses, but he keeps getting carried away on red herrings or puts himself into trouble, so he is not really much of a help for Anna. He does not like Wilsberg, who often makes a fool of him, and even tends to suspect Wilsberg (who has a habit of stumbling over dead bodies wherever he goes) of being the murderer.

== Disparities between films and books ==
Readers of the novels recognise many of the plots and locations in the television series; however, some adaptation was needed in order to make the material easily intelligible to a national audience and to those who had not read the books. Due to the success of the series new scripts were commissioned recounting stories not present in the novels.
