= Ben Becker =

German actor (born 1964)

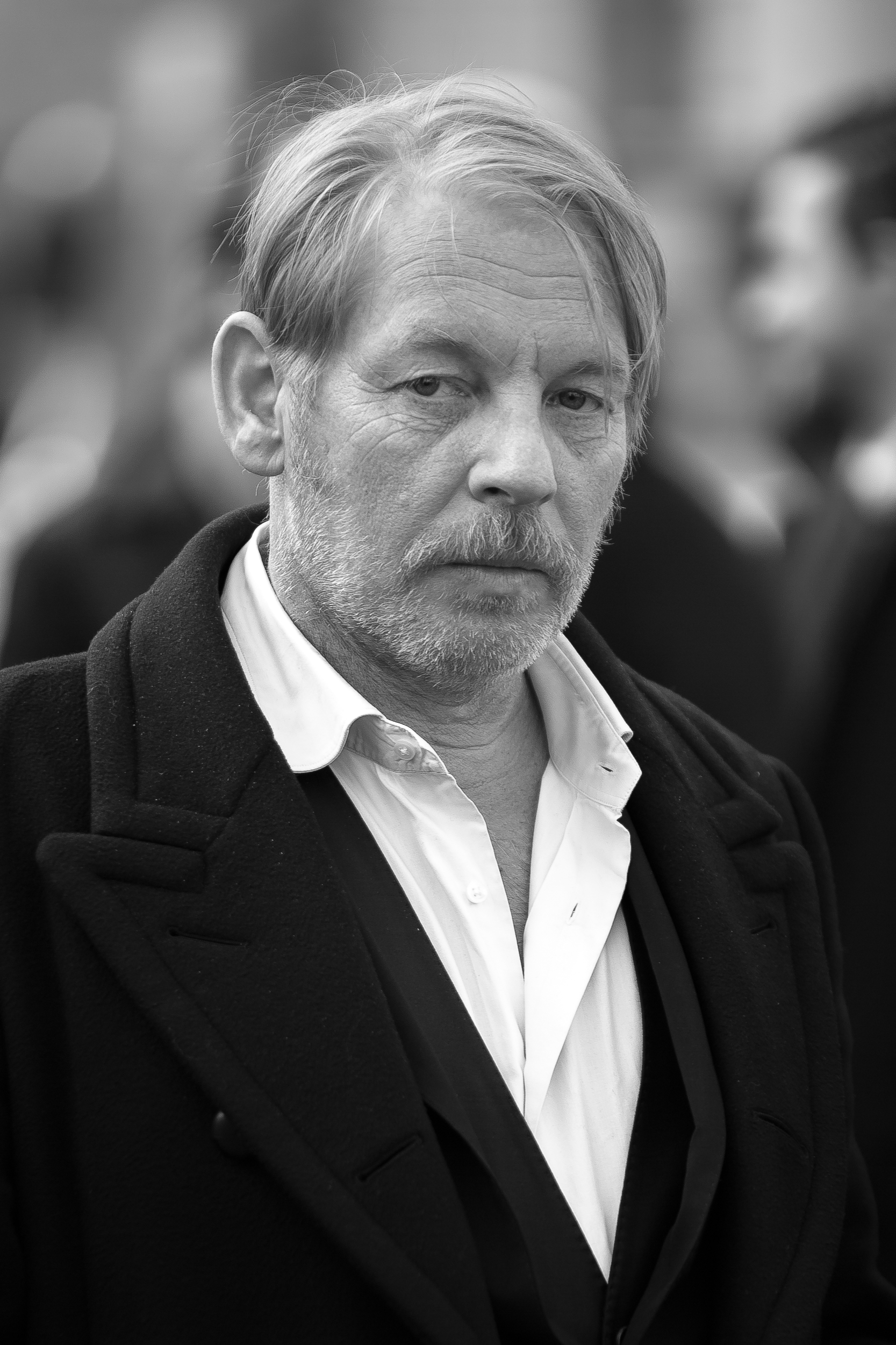
Becker in 2017

Ben Becker (born 19 December 1964) is a German film, theatre and voice actor.

== Biography ==
Becker was born in Bremen, the son of actress Monika Hansen and actor Rolf Becker. He is the brother of actress Meret Becker and the stepson of Otto Sander. His grandmother was the comedian Claire Schlichting. Becker is Jewish through his maternal grandmother Claire Schlichting's father who was a Jewish merchant from Wuppertal.

As a child, Becker participated in radio dramas and had several small roles in films. Between 1985 and 1987, he trained as an actor in the Berliner Schaubühne theatre. His first contract was with Ernst Deutsch Theater in Hamburg. Later, he joined the Staatstheater Stuttgart (Stuttgart State Theatre), where he was mostly remembered for his role (1991–1992) as Ferdinand in Schiller's Intrigue and Love. Later, he worked with the Düsseldorfer Schauspielhaus and played the role of Tybalt in Shakespeare's Romeo and Juliet in the Deutschen Schauspielhaus in Hamburg.

His first memorable role in cinema was in 1991, in the film The Serbian Girl, where he played the role of the arrogant German boyfriend of the pregnant Serbian heroine. His big break was in 1995 as Peter, who fell in love with a man, in Joseph Vilsmaier's Schlafes Bruder. In the film Comedian Harmonists he played the singer Robert Biberti.

In 1995, he created his own production of Sid & Nancy with his sister Meret in the main role. Becker appeared in Rosa von Praunheim's film The Einstein of Sex (1999). In 1999, he played the main role in the Maxim-Gorki-Theater's production of Alfred Döblin's Berlin Alexanderplatz. In 2005, he played in the unique film, Just an Ordinary Jew, which consisted of a monologue.

Becker is also involved in music and owns a pub, the Trompete, in Berlin/Tiergarten. He has one daughter, Lilith (born in 2000).

In 2008, Becker worked with the German band Schiller (thus following in the footsteps of his stepfather Otto Sander), where Ben did spoken lyrics for the album Sehnsucht. One song is called "Nacht", a video of which can be seen on YouTube. The lyrics are a shortened version of a poem in German called Die Seele that is attributed to Lord Byron. It appears to be a translation of the Byron poem, "When coldness wraps this suffering clay" from the collection Hebrew Melodies. The identity of the translator/author of Die Seele is unknown although the text may be from "Lord Byrons Werke In sechs Bänden" translated by Otto Gildemeister, 3rd Volume, Fifth Edition, Berlin 1903 (pages 134-135).

== Selected filmography ==
Year	Title	Role	Director	Notes
1991	The Serbian Girl	Hans	Peter Sehr	
1992	Rising to the Bait	Funke	Vadim Glowna	
1992	Landschaft mit Dornen	Ric	Bernd Böhlich	TV film
1995	Brother of Sleep	Martin	Joseph Vilsmaier	
1996	Life Is a Bluff	Harry Butzbach	Peter Zingler	
1996	Samson and Delilah	Prince Sidqa	Nicolas Roeg	TV film
1997	Code Red	Johannes Stanek	Carlo Rola	TV film
1997	Comedian Harmonists	Robert Biberti	Joseph Vilsmaier	
1997	Spiel um dein Leben	Nick	Friedemann Fromm	TV film
1999	Our Island in the South Pacific	Dr. Helmut Kupert	Thomas Bahmann	
1999	Gloomy Sunday	Hans Wieck	Rolf Schübel	
1999	The Einstein of Sex	Adolf Brand	Rosa von Praunheim	
2001	Female 2 Seeks Happy End	Gregor Reuther	Edward Berger	
2001	Sass	Franz Sass	Carlo Rola	
2002	Trenck	Friedrich von der Trenck	Gernot Roll	TV film
2005	Just an Ordinary Jew	Emanuel Goldfarb	Oliver Hirschbiegel	
2009	Der Tiger oder Was Frauen lieben!	Tiger	Niki Stein	TV film
2010	Habermann	Koslowski	Juraj Herz	
2012	The Child	Andreas Borchert	Zsolt Bács	
2014	Rough Road Ahead	Ruby's Father	Christian Frosch	
2015	CHIX – Back on Stage	Roy	Jan Ruzicka	TV film
2018	Never Look Away	Foreman Otto	Florian Henckel von Donnersmarck	

== Awards ==
- 1997 Bavarian Film Award, Special Prize
