= Der Sturz =

1979 West German film directed by Alf Brustellin

- Directed by: Alf Brustellin
- Written by: Bernhard Sinkel; Alf Brustellin
- Based on: Der Sturz by Martin Walser
- Produced by: Heinz Angermeyer; Bertram Vetter
- Starring: Franz Buchrieser; Hannelore Elsner
- Cinematography: Dietrich Lohmann
- Edited by: Annette Dorn
- Music by: Klaus Doldinger
- Distributed by: Filmverlag der Autoren
- Release date: 18 January 1979
- Running time: 103 minutes
- Country: West Germany
- Language: German

Der Sturz (lit. 'The Fall') is a 1979 West German drama film directed by Alf Brustellin, starring Franz Buchrieser and Hannelore Elsner. It portrays a failed intellectual who loses his wife's inheritance on gambling, partying and a poor investment in pinball machines in Munich, before he moves home to Lake Constance and brings his drinking buddies with him. The film is based on the novel Der Sturz, which is the third part in the Anselm Kristlein trilogy by Martin Walser.

The film was distributed in West Germany by Filmverlag der Autoren and premiered on 18 January 1979. Hellmuth Karasek of Der Spiegel wrote that Brustellin fails to adapt Walser's novel, and conveys a fall only in the sense that Der Sturz is a catastrophic failure as a film. Filmdienst wrote that the film lacks narrative drive and has turned the novel's language and storytelling into jumbled images.

== Cast ==
- Franz Buchrieser as Anselm Kristlein
- Hannelore Elsner as Alissa Kristlein
- Wolfgang Kieling as Edmund Gabriel
- Eva Maria Meineke as Rosa Blomich
- Klaus Pohl as Elmar Glatthaar
- Kurt Raab as Theopont Dirlewanger
- Carl Fox-Duering as Michel Enzinger
- Mady Rahl as Frau Eltron
- Heidy Forster as Vroni
- Kurt Weinzierl as Dr. Freudenreich
- Max Strecker as Kaiser
- Monika Reuter as Lissa
- Martina Reuter as Drea
- Markus Reuter as Guido
- Oscar Heiler as König
