= Erika Marozsán =

Hungarian actress (born 1972)

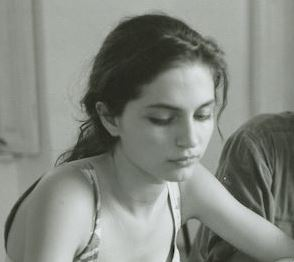
- Marozsán in 1993
- Born: 3 August 1972 (age 54); Újfehértó, Hungary
- Education: Budapest Academy of Drama and Film
- Occupation: Actress
- Years active: 1989–present

Erika Marozsán (born 3 August 1972) is a Hungarian actress.

== Career ==
Marozsán learned to play the piano as a child. She graduated from the Budapest Academy of Drama and Film in 1995 and then became a member of Új Színház ("New Theatre") in Budapest.

Her first movie appearance was in the hit Hungarian film, Béketárgyalás, avagy az évszázad csütörtökig tart (Peace negotiations – This century lasts until Thursday), released in 1989. She has played primarily in Hungarian films, but also appeared on the Cinemax hit action thriller, Sniper 2, with Tom Berenger and Bokeem Woodbine, as well as Gloomy Sunday and One Day Crossing, which was nominated for an Oscar in 2001.

== Selected filmography ==
- Bukfenc (1993)
- Kismadár (1993)
- The Wondrous Voyage of Kornel Esti (1995)
- Szökés (1997)
- Pannon töredék (1998)
- Országalma (1998)
- Cukorkékség (1999)
- Gloomy Sunday (1999)
- Valaki Kopog /TV Series/ (2000)
- Lárá (2000)
- One Day Crossing (2001)
- Álomhajó /TV Series/ (2001)
- Vienna (2002)
- Die Katzenfrau (2002)
- Előre (2002)
- Der Freund von fruher (2002)
- Die Cleveren /TV Series/ (2002)
- Inspektor Rolle /TV Series/ (2002)
- Sniper 2 (TV Movie) (2002)
- The Poet (2003)
- Palackba zárt szerelem (2003)
- Rózsadomb (2004)
- The Bestseller – Wiener Blut (2004)
- Solidarity (2005)
- Tote leben länger (2005)
- Relatives (2005)
- Vilniaus Getas (Ghetto) (2005)
- Alpesi Nyomozók /TV Series/ (2006)
- Feast of Love (2007)
- Polly Adler /TV Series/ (2008)
- Jew Suss: Rise and Fall (2010)
- Ivory (2010)
- Adventure (2011)
- Inga Lindström: Frederiks Schuld (2011)
- Terápia (2012)
- Sources of Life (2013)
- Családi Gyökerek (2013)
- Ein Sommer in Ungarn (2014)
- Unexpected (2014)
- Styria (2014)
- Better Than Nothing (2014)
- Janus (2015)
- Paraziták a Paradicsomban (2018)
