= A Couch in New York =

1996 film by Chantal Akerman

- French theatrical release poster
- French: Un divan à New York
- Directed by: Chantal Akerman
- Written by: Chantal Akerman; Jean-Louis Benoît
- Produced by: Régine Konckier; Jean-Luc Ormières
- Starring: Juliette Binoche; William Hurt; Stephanie Buttle; Paul Guilfoyle; Barbara Garrick; Richard Jenkins; Kent Broadhurst; Henry Bean
- Cinematography: Dietrich Lohmann
- Edited by: Claire Atherton
- Music by: Sonia Wieder-Atherton
- Production companies: Les Films Balenciaga; France 2 Cinéma; M6 Films; Babelsberg Film Produktion; Paradise Films; RTBF
- Distributed by: PolyGram Film Distribution (France)
- Release dates: 21 February 1996 (Belgium); 10 April 1996 (France); 29 August 1996 (Germany)
- Running time: 102 minutes
- Countries: France; Germany; Belgium
- Languages: English; French

A Couch in New York (French: Un divan à New York) is a 1996 romantic comedy film co-written and directed by Chantal Akerman. The plot centers on an anonymous exchange of apartments between a successful New York psychoanalyst (William Hurt) and a young woman from Paris (Juliette Binoche).

== Plot ==
Henry Harriston is a psychoanalyst whose patients are driving him crazy by constantly leaving him messages during his off hours. On a whim he places an ad offering up his apartment for a housing swap. Béatrice Saulnier (Juliette Binoche) a Parisian dancer responds to his ad and without meeting the two switch apartments. Béatrice is impressed with Henry's high-tech apartment which is both beautiful and spacious. Henry meanwhile is horrified when he arrives in Béatrice's apartment and finds it filthy and messy.

Meanwhile, Henry's patients, who Henry sees at home, begin coming to his apartment seeking therapy. Béatrice begins listening to their stories, and the patients accept her as Henry's temporary replacement.

At Béatrice's apartment Henry discovers a cache of love-letters written to Béatrice by various men. Béatrice's lovers also begin showing up in her apartment and talking to Henry about their love for her. When they begin calling the apartment telling Henry how helpful he was and how they want to talk to him again he turns tail and returns to New York.

Originally intending to simply pick up his mail, Henry notices that his patients keep coming in and out of his apartment and, when he tries to enter his apartment, is pushed out by Béatrice's friend who is posing as her receptionist. Believing that Béatrice is intentionally running a scam, he goes to confront her, posing as a fake patient, John. Instead of confronting her however, he keeps up the ruse of being a patient, but is unable to talk and the session consists of Béatrice and Henry saying "Yes" back and forth at one another. Despite this, the two find themselves attracted to one another and the session ends with Béatrice suggesting that Henry, as John, come back. Henry meanwhile is convinced that Béatrice really does mean well and decides to keep up the ruse and continue seeing her.

After a particular session in which Henry talks about his distant relationship with his mother, both Henry and Béatrice begin to think they've fallen in love with one another. Henry refuses to say anything, feeling too cowardly, while Béatrice's friend tells her she cannot be involved in a relationship with a patient. Béatrice and Henry become close and continue to feel strongly towards one another. During one of their sessions the light turns off and both secretly whisper love confessions in the dark, but neither hears what the other is saying. Henry's friend urges him to run to Béatrice or write her a letter but as these are all things that Béatrice's previous lovers have done that have failed, Henry refuses. He decides that the only way the situation will be resolved is if Béatrice confesses her love to him. Instead she calls him late at night to tell him their sessions must come to an end as she is returning to Paris. Henry tells Béatrice he loves her, but she hangs up before she hears what he has said.

Henry rushes to the airport hoping to get a last minute flight to Paris. Unfortunately, the plane is overbooked. Henry decides to wait on standby. He is able to get the last ticket as one passenger has not shown up, however that ticket belonged to Béatrice, so while Henry flies to Paris, searching the plane, looking for Béatrice, Béatrice stays behind.

Eventually arriving home, Béatrice realizes she cannot go to her apart as Henry is still in her apartment and goes to stay with her neighbour. On her neighbour's terrace she sees her plants which have flourished in her absence. She strikes up a conversation with Henry, who she cannot see through the plants. He disguises his voice so she will not recognize him. Talking to Henry through the plants Béatrice confesses that she came early because she had fallen in love with one of Henry's patients, John.

Realizing that Henry and John are one and the same person, Béatrice climbs over the terrace back into her apartment and kisses Henry, telling him she loves him.

== Cast ==
- Juliette Binoche as Béatrice Saulnier
- William Hurt as Henry Harriston
- Stephanie Buttle as Anne
- Barbara Garrick as Lizbeth Honeywell
- Paul Guilfoyle as Dennis
- Richard Jenkins as Campton
- Kent Broadhurst as Tim
- Matthew Burton as Wood
- Henry Bean as Stein
- Bernard Breuse as Jérôme
- Adam LeFevre as restaurant patron
- Boris Leskin as cab driver #1
- Tiffany Frazer as Julie
- Wendy Way as employee at airport
- Jerry Dean as cab driver #2

== Reception ==
Janet Maslin of The New York Times wrote, "It takes a while to get past the strained, wide-eyed ingenuousness of A Couch in New York, in which [Akerman's] solemn side and Mr. Hurt's own gravity are never out of reach", but added that "once the film moves past its initial vapidity, it takes on a reasonably blithe aura of romance", concluding, "Coming from Ms. Akerman, this is pleasant but unaccountable fluff." David Rooney of Variety criticised the dialogue and felt that "Akerman attempts to create a magical atmosphere akin to that of a musical, with blithely improbable narrative shortcuts and fairy-tale skies, but the result is flat and labored", while stating that "Hurt and Binoche appear awkward in their roles".
