= Lina Braake =

- Directed by: Bernhard Sinkel
- Written by: Bernhard Sinkel
- Produced by: Peter Märthesheimer; Bernhard Sinkel
- Starring: Lina Carstens; Fritz Rasp; Herbert Bötticher
- Cinematography: Alf Brustellin
- Edited by: Heidi Genée
- Music by: Joe Haider
- Production companies: Bernhard Sinkel Filmproduktion; Westdeutscher Rundfunk
- Release date: 11 July 1975
- Running time: 85 minutes
- Country: West Germany
- Language: German

Lina Braake (Brechtian subtitle: Die Interessen der Bank können nicht die Interessen sein, die Lina Braake hat) is a 1975 West German drama film directed by Bernhard Sinkel and starring Lina Carstens, Fritz Rasp and Herbert Bötticher.

The film's sets were designed by the art director Nicos Perakis.

== Cast ==
- Lina Carstens as Lina Braake
- Fritz Rasp as Gustaf Haertlein
- Herbert Bötticher as Johannes Koerner
- Ellen Mahlke as Scholz
- Benno Hoffmann as Jawlonski
- Rainer Basedow as Fink
- Erica Schramm as Lene Schoener
- Walter Sedlmayr as Emil Schoener
- Oskar von Schab as Duerr
- Gustl Datz as Gruber
- Ellen Frank as Mangold
- Wilfried Klaus as Wenzel
- Teseo Tavernese as Ettore Falconi

== Bibliography ==
- Reimer, Robert C. & Reimer, Carol J. The A to Z of German Cinema. Scarecrow Press, 2010.
