= Leonard Lansink =

German actor (born 1956)

- Lansink in 2026
- Born: 7 January 1956 (age 70); Hamm, West Germany
- Citizenship: Germany
- Occupation: Actor
- Years active: 1983–present

Leonard Lansink (born 7 January 1956) is a German actor. He appeared in more than one hundred films since 1983.

== Selected filmography ==
Film
Year	Title	Role	Notes
1987	Hollywood-Monster	Karl	
1996	Killer Condom	Babette (Bob Miller)	
1997	Knockin' on Heaven's Door	Kommissar Schneider	
1998	The Polar Bear	Barkeeper Paul's Eck	
2009	Der Teufel mit den drei goldenen Haaren	King	TV film

TV
Year	Title	Role	Notes
1983–1993	Tatort	Various	4 episodes
1986	Auf Achse	Burgs Jr.	Episode: "Einmal gerade – einmal krumm"
1990–1999	SOKO 5113	Various	3 episodes
1990–2002	A Case for Two	Various	7 episodes
1994–2008	Ein starkes Team	Georg Scholz	29 episodes
1994	Schwarz greift ein	Kolmar	Episode: "Die Macht des Wortes"
1994	Forsthaus Falkenau	Herr Bartsch	Episode: "Kuppeleien"
1994	Familie Heinz Becker	Bus driver	Episode: "Die Busfahrt nach Lourdes"
1995	Inspector Rex	Prantz	Episode: "Schüsse auf Rex"
1995–1998	A.S.	Kommissar Krüger	29 episodes
1996	Adelheid und ihre Mörder	Volker Tönissen	Episode: "Tod auf Bestellung"
1996	Stockinger	Herr Kreuzbruck	Episode: "Mord-Saison im See-Hotel"
1998–2002	Der letzte Zeuge	Dr. Harald Sänger	11 episodes
Since 1998	Wilsberg	Georg Wilsberg	90 episodes
1999	Das Amt	Grawinski	Episode: "Das Amt in Berlin"
1999	Im Namen des Gesetzes	Heinz Bruckmann	Episode: "Fehlurteil"
1999	Our Charly	Dieter Kabisch	Episode: "Fahrerflucht"
2002	Highspeed – Die Ledercops	Dr. Johannes Rubenthal	4 episodes
2003	Küstenwache	Kapitän Anderson	Episode: "Schicksalsschläge"
2004	Polizeiruf 110	Bernd Grande	Episode: "Rosentod"
2004, 2026	Das Traumschiff	Prof. Dr. Kolin, Lennard Khan	2 episodes
2006	Pfarrer Braun	Florian Graf	Episode: "Drei Särge und ein Baby"
