= The Promise (1995 film) =

1995 film

- Film poster
- Directed by: Margarethe von Trotta
- Screenplay by: Felice Laudadio and Margarethe von Trotta (with Peter Schneider)
- Produced by: Eberhard Junkersdorf
- Starring: Corinna Harfouch; Meret Becker; August Zirner; Tina Engel; Dieter Mann; Eva Mattes
- Music by: Jürgen Knieper
- Distributed by: Concorde Filmverleih (Germany); Eurozoom (France)
- Release date: 1995
- Running time: 115 minutes
- Countries: Germany; France; Switzerland
- Language: German

The Promise (German: Das Versprechen) is a 1995 German-language film directed by Margarethe von Trotta. It was an international co-production between Germany, France and Switzerland. The film was chosen as Germany's official submission to the 67th Academy Awards for Best Foreign Language Film, but did not receive a nomination.

== Synopsis ==
Two young lovers in Berlin are separated when the Berlin Wall goes up. Their stories intertwine during the three decades to German reunification.

== Cast ==
- Corinna Harfouch: Sophie
- Meret Becker: young Sophie
- August Zirner: Konrad
- Anian Zollner: young Konrad
- Jörg Meister: Alexander, 20 years of age
- Tina Engel: Sophie's aunt
- Monika Hansen: Sophie's mother
- Klaus Piontek: Sophie's stepfather
- Ruth Glöss: Konrad's granny
- Dieter Mann: Konrad's father
- Simone von Zglinicki: Konrad's mother
- Hans Kremer: Harald
- Eva Mattes: Barbara
- Susann Ugé: young Barbara
- Hark Bohm: Müller
- Otto Sander: Professor Lorenz
- Anka Baier: Monika
- Sven Lehmann: Max
- Heiko Senst: Wolfgang
- Ulrike Krumbiegel: Elisabeth

== See also ==
- List of submissions to the 67th Academy Awards for Best Foreign Language Film
- List of German submissions for the Academy Award for Best Foreign Language Film
