= The Morals of Ruth Halbfass =

- Directed by: Volker Schlöndorff
- Written by: Peter Hamm; Volker Schlöndorff
- Produced by: Hans Prescher; Volker Schlöndorff
- Starring: Senta Berger; Peter Ehrlich; Helmut Griem
- Cinematography: Konrad Kotowski; Klaus Müller-Laue
- Edited by: Claus von Boro
- Music by: Friedrich Meyer
- Production companies: Hallelujah Films; Hessischer Rundfunk; Junior Film
- Distributed by: Cinema International Corporation
- Release date: 13 April 1972
- Running time: 89 minutes
- Country: West Germany
- Language: German

The Morals of Ruth Halbfass (German: Die Moral der Ruth Halbfass) is a 1972 West German drama film directed by Volker Schlöndorff and starring Senta Berger, Peter Ehrlich and Helmut Griem.

== Cast ==
- Senta Berger as Ruth Halbfass
- Peter Ehrlich as Erich Halbfass
- Helmut Griem as Franz Vogelsang
- Margarethe von Trotta as Doris Vogelsang
- Marian Seidowsky as Francesco, the hairdresser
- Karl-Heinz Merz as Bonaparte, the killer
- Susanne Rettig as Aglaia, the daughter
- Alexandra Bogojevic as Helga, the lover
- Wilhelm Grasshoff as Spengler, the bank director
- Walter Sedlmayr as The arms dealer
- Maddalena Kerrh as Lady from the art society
- Hans Ohly
- Mathias Lohmer
- Peter Hamm
- Horst Schäfer
- Hans Adolph

== Bibliography ==
- Hans Bernhard Moeller & George L Lellis. Volker Schlondorff's Cinema: Adaptation, Politics, and the "Movie-Appropriate". SIU Press, 2012.
