= Sam Cox (actor) =

British television and stage actor

- Occupation: Actor
- Years active: 1980–present

Sam Cox is a British television and stage actor. He has portrayed The Adventures of Tintin character Captain Haddock in the stage production of Tintin in Tibet, and Detective Inspector Bishop in the Doctor Who episode "The Idiot's Lantern." His face can be found on one of the Trading Cards in the Doctor Who - Battles in Time Exterminator Set.
