= Germany in Autumn =

1978 film

- Theatrical release poster
- Directed by: Alf Brustellin; Hans Peter Cloos; Rainer Werner Fassbinder; Alexander Kluge; Beate Mainka-Jellinghaus; Maximiliane Mainka; Edgar Reitz; Katja Rupé; Volker Schlöndorff; Peter Schubert; Bernhard Sinkel
- Produced by: Theo Hinz; Eberhard Junkersdorf
- Starring: Hannelore Hoger; Angela Winkler; Franziska Walser; Helmut Griem
- Release date: 17 March 1978 (West Germany)
- Running time: 119 minutes
- Country: West Germany
- Language: German

Germany in Autumn (German: Deutschland im Herbst) is a 1978 West German anthology film about the period of 1977 known as the German Autumn, which was dominated by incidents of terrorism. The film is composed of contributions from different filmmakers, including Rainer Werner Fassbinder, Alexander Kluge, Edgar Reitz, Bernhard Sinkel, Alf Brustellin, Hans Peter Cloos, Katja Rupé, Peter Schubert and Volker Schlöndorff. It was entered into the 28th Berlin International Film Festival, where it won a Special Recognition award.

== Plot ==
The following fictional and documentary sequences are loosely intertwined.

=== Hanns-Martin Schleyer ===
The state memorial service of Hanns-Martin Schleyer, leading German industrialist and head of the Daimler-Benz corporation, kidnapped and killed by members of the RAF. Later we see a Turkish man arrested outside the memorial service for possession of a rifle, factory workers standing in silence to mark Schleyer's death, and hospitality staff at the memorial service preparing to serve snacks. Directed by Alexander Kluge.

=== Rainer Werner Fassbinder ===
A series of dialogues between Rainer Werner Fassbinder and his mother, his ex-wife Ingrid Caven, his boyfriend Armin Meier and others reflecting on the news of the alleged suicides of RAF members Andreas Baader, Gudrun Ensslin and Jan-Carl Raspe in the top-security prison of Stuttgart-Stammheim. Directed by Rainer Werner Fassbinder.

=== Gabi Teichert ===
A history teacher called Gabi Teichert is questioning some of the curriculum she teaches, causing concern among her superiors. Narrated archive footage explores some of her research into German history, including the Mayerling incident, the German Military Railway, the Spartacist uprising, and the poisoning of Erwin Rommel by the Nazi government.

Documentary footage appears later on in the film of the 1977 SPD conference in which speakers condemn the actions of left-wing terrorists. Gabi Teichert, from the earlier sequences, is in the audience studiously taking notes during a speech by Max Frisch. Directed by Alexander Kluge.

=== Franziska Busch ===
A young woman is punched in an underground car park. Another young woman driving past the incident, Franziska Busch, gets out of her car and thwarts the assailant. She then brings the victim home and takes care of her. The scene is accompanied by a song by Wolf Biermann.

The RAF co-founder Horst Mahler is interviewed in prison by a TV company and claims that fascism continues to exist in West Germany after the Nazi era. He also unpicks the moral contradictions of left-wing terrorism. Franziska Busch watches the interview footage in the TV studio auditorium where her boyfriend works. Busch begins to make propaganda films with a revolutionary group she is part of. They film the German singer Wolf Biermann performing 'Girl in Stuttgart' a monologue which questions the official version of events regarding the Stammheim death night. Directed by Bernhard Sinkel and Alf Brustellin.

=== Schatten der Angst (Shadow of Fear) ===
In Munich a woman is visited by an injured man who is bleeding from the forehead and welcomes him into her apartment. She sees his face on a newspaper among the headshots of wanted terrorists, but chooses not to inform on him. Directed by Hans Peter Cloos and Katja Rupé.

=== Grenzstation ===
Customs officers patrol a crossing between France and Germany. An unmarried couple driving through are stopped and have their identification papers checked. The guard speculates that the woman bears a resemblance to one of the wanted terrorists. They are eventually let through. Directed by Edgar Reitz.

=== Bundeswehr ===
Documentary footage of the German army performing various land and air drills across the German countryside. Directed by Peter Schubert.

=== The Postponed Antigone ===
A board of TV producers meet to discuss an upcoming televisation of Sophocles' tragedy Antigone. They discuss preceding the broadcast with a disclaimer, given the febrile political atmosphere and the play's exploration of death, authority and political resistance. After much debate they agree not to broadcast the play at all. Written by Heinrich Böll and directed by Volker Schlöndorff

=== Funeral ===
The film concludes with Kluge's footage from the funeral of Andreas Baader, Gudrun Ensslin and Jan-Carl Raspe, which is attended by hundreds of protestors, some of whom are subsequently arrested. Directed by Alexander Kluge.

The film begins and ends with the same quote from 'Frau Wilde (mother of five)', April 1945: ‘When cruelty has reached a certain point, it no longer matters who is responsible – it simply has to stop’. Frau Wilde had been buried alive after a bombardment and was speaking to an American army psycho-specialist.

== Cast ==
- Hannelore Hoger as Gabi Teichert, history teacher
- Angela Winkler as Antigone
- Franziska Walser as Ismene, sister of Antigone
- Helmut Griem as Creon, uncle of Antigone
- Mario Adorf, Heinz Bennent, Otto Friebel, Michael Gahr, Helmut Griem, Dieter Laser, Enno Patalas as the TV producers
- Vadim Glowna as husband
- Katja Rupé as Branka, pianist
- Hans Peter Cloos as wounded foreigner
- Rainer Werner Fassbinder
- Wolf Biermann
- Horst Mahler
- Armin Meier
- Max Frisch

== Soundtrack ==
The musical theme of the film is an excerpt from the second movement in G major of the quartet in C major, Op. 76 No. 3 L'Empereur by Joseph Haydn, later adapted as national anthem of Germany as Deutschlandlied.

Mozart's Requiem in D minor is heard at the funeral ceremony of Hanns-Martin Schleyer and when the three-pointed star flags at Daimler-Benz are at half-mast.

After the funeral of Andreas Baader, Gudrun Ensslin and Jan-Carl Raspe of the RAF, the film ends with the song "Here's to You" by Joan Baez and Ennio Morricone in homage to anarchists Nicola Sacco and Bart Vanzetti, while a young mother with her little daughter in the red jacket escapes public disturbances at Dornhalden cemetery.

== Reception ==
On the review aggregator website Rotten Tomatoes, 100% of 5 critics' reviews are positive.
