= Hans Kremer =

German actor (born 1954)

- Born: 19 March 1954 (age 72); Pirmasens, Germany
- Occupation: Actor
- Years active: 1984-present

Hans Kremer (born 19 March 1954) is a German actor. He has appeared in more than fifty films since 1984.

== Filmography ==
Year	Title	Role	Notes
1984	Knock on the Wrong Door		
1986	Stammheim	Jan-Carl Raspe	
1986	Now or Never	Doctor	
1989	Er - Sie - Es	Dr. Ziemecki	
1994	The Promise	Harald II	
1997	Mendel	Aron Trotzig	
2003	Rosenstrasse	Hauptsturmführer Weber	
2005	Willenbrock	Prosecutor	
2008	Meine Mutter, mein Bruder und ich!	Beamter Goldstein	
2008	The Red Spot	Johannes Weber	
2012	Rommel	General Marcks	TV movie
2013	The Taste of Apple Seeds	Hinnerk	
