= Meret Becker =

German actress and singer (born 1969)

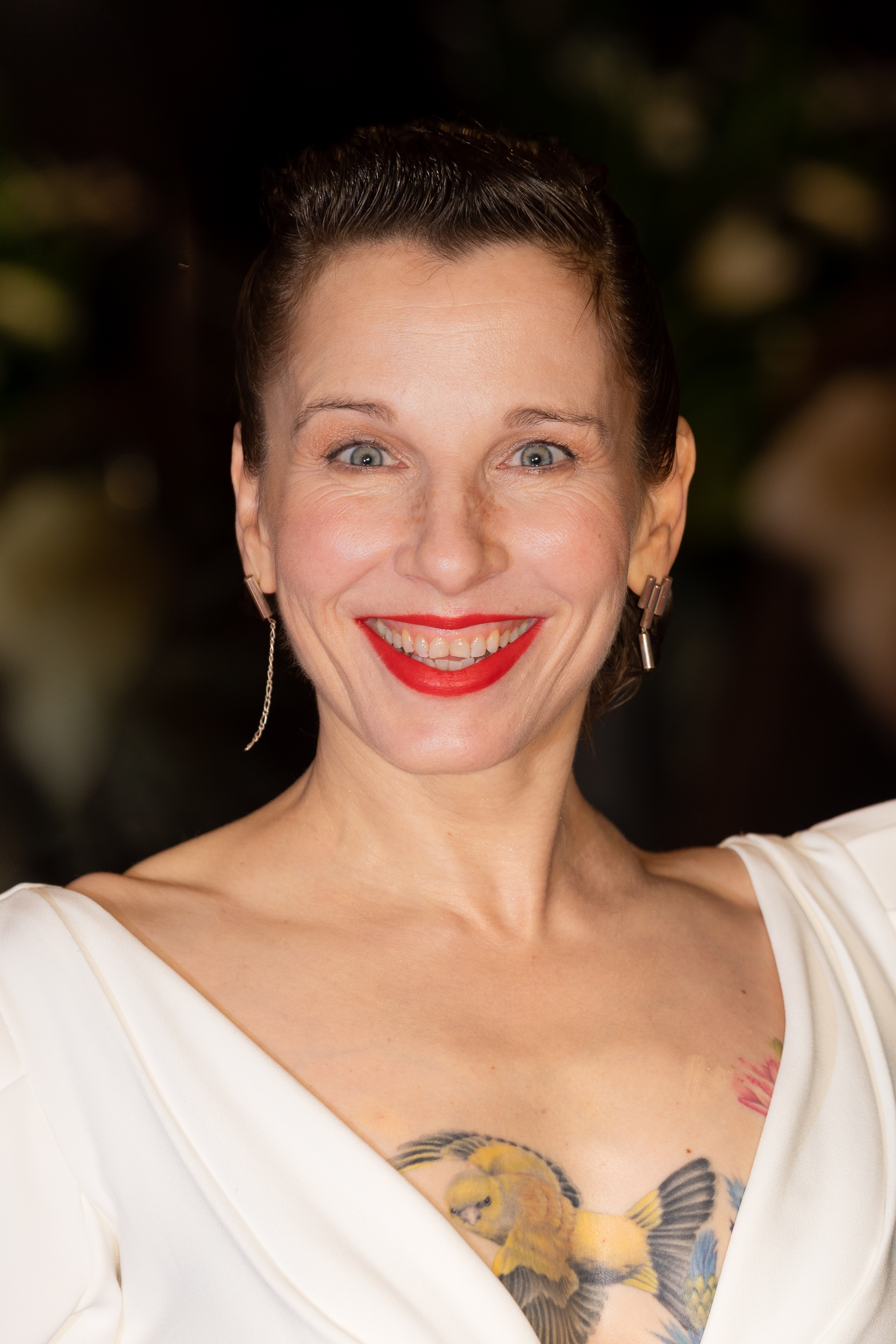
- Becker in 2020
- Born: 15 January 1969 (age 57); Bremen, West Germany
- Occupations: Actress; singer
- Spouse: Alexander Hacke (m. 1996; div. 2002)
- Children: 1
- Father: Rolf Becker
- Relatives: Otto Sander (stepfather); Ben Becker (brother)

Meret Becker (German: [ˈmɛʁɛt ˈbɛkɐ]; born 15 January 1969) is a German actress and singer.

== Life and career ==
Meret Becker was born in Bremen, the daughter of the actors Monika Hansen and Rolf Becker. She was raised in Berlin by her mother with her stepfather Otto Sander along with her brother Ben Becker. She is the granddaughter of comedian Claire Schlichting and the niece of the acrobat and comedian Jonny Buchardt.

In 1996, she married Alexander Hacke, a member of the band Einstürzende Neubauten, who contributed songs to Becker's albums, including Noctambule. They separated in 2000 and divorced two years later. Becker was a guest musician on Einstürzende Neubauten's album Ende Neu, singing Stella Maris in a duet with Blixa Bargeld.

She played the character Ernal Eggstein in the 1997 German film Comedian Harmonists, as well as Katya, a prostitute, in Painted Angels. A year later, in 1998, she gave several performances along with Nina Hagen. The short but sold-out tour was titled "Wir heißen beide Anna" in which both Becker and Hagen sang several songs by Bertold Brecht, set to music by Paul Dessau and Kurt Weill. Becker appeared in Rosa von Praunheim's film The Einstein of Sex (1999).

Meret has since recorded two studio albums, Nachtmahr, which featured Robert Rutman playing his giant sheetmetal instruments on several tracks, and Fragiles. Just like the first album, both of them contain songs, poetry and short stories, played with unusual instruments and avant-garde arrangements. In 1993, she appeared as the female singer in the U2 video for "Stay (Faraway, So Close!)". In 2005, she was a supporting actress in the film Munich, directed by Steven Spielberg.

From 2015 to 2022 she played Nina Rubin as a character in German tv-serie Tatort.

Since 2020, she appeaered as a character of Esther Kasabian in a German neo-noir television series Babylon Berlin.

== Solo discography ==
- Noctambule (1996)
- Nachtmahr (1998)
- Fragiles (2001)
- Pipermint - Das Leben, möglicherweise OST (2005)
- Deins & Done (2014)

== Collaborations ==
- 1993-'95 (live album with Ars Vitalis) (1995)
- Interviewed by Clive James for the BBC special, Clive James's Postcard From Berlin (1995)
- Stella Maris (duet with Einstürzende Neubauten) (1996)
- Performed on Dorothy Carter's album Lonesome Dove (2000)

== Selected filmography ==
- Put on Ice (1980), as Anna
- Werner – Beinhart! (1990), as Rumpelstilzchen
- Alone Among Women (1991), as Leah
- Happy Birthday, Turk! (1992), as Hanna Hecht
- All Lies (1992), as Bride
- Little Sharks (1992), as Herta
- Geteilte Nacht (1993), as Katrin
- Ebbie's Bluff (1993)
- Music Video for Stay (Faraway, So Close!) by U2 (1993, Video short), as Band's Lead Singer
- The Innocent (1993), as Ulrike
- Fernes Land Pa-Isch (1994, released in 2000), as Bibi
- The Blue One (1994), as Isabelle Skrodt
- Shameless (1994, TV film), as Rita
- The Invincibles (1994), as Sunny Schaefer
- The Promise (1994), as Sophie
- Killer Condom (1996), as Phyllis Higgins
- Rossini (1997), as Zille Watussnik
- Diamanten küßt man nicht (1997, TV film), as Charlie
- Life is All You Get (1997), as Moni
- Comedian Harmonists (1997), as Erna Eggstein
- Painted Angels (1998), as Katya
- Hundert Jahre Brecht (1998), as Jenny
- Das Gelbe vom Ei (1999, TV film), as Fanny Freese
- Annaluise & Anton (1999), as Elli Gast
- The Volcano (1999), as Tilly von Kammer
- The Einstein of Sex (1999), as a worker
- Rote Glut (2000, TV film), as Judith Vegener
- Il furto del tesoro (2000), as Lulu
- Planet Alex (2001), as Frau
- Heinrich der Säger (2001), as Teresa Grantke
- Null Uhr 12 (2001), as Kathrin
- Nogo (2002), as Maria
- Mutti – Der Film (2003), as Dr. Loch
- Poem – Ich setzte den Fuß in die Luft und sie trug (2003)
- Hamlet_X (2003), as Hamlet
- Cats' Tongues (2003, TV film), as Dodo
- The Wishing Tree (2004, TV miniseries), as Lou Hofmann
- PiperMint (2004), as Sanja
- Three Degrees Colder (2005), as Jenny
- The Call of the Toad (2005), as Sophia
- Polly Blue Eyes (2005), as Maria Pinn
- Vacation from Life (2005), as Sophie Paulsen
- Munich (2005), as Yvonne
- Happy as One (2006), as Mathilda Berger
- My Führer – The Really Truest Truth about Adolf Hitler (2007), as Sekretärin
- Messy Christmas (2007), as Pauline
- Die Glücklichen (2008), as Helene
- Peaceful Times (2008), as Musiklehrerin
- Record 12 (2009), as Alena
- Boxhagener Platz (2010), as Renate
- Gurbet – Fremde Heimat (2010), as Irina
- Life Is Too Long (2010), as Helena Seliger
- Kokowääh (2011), as Charlotte
- Fliegende Fische müssen ins Meer (2011), as Roberta Meiringer
- Die Lehrerin (2011, TV film), as Katja
- Sources of Life (2013), as Elisabeth Freytag
- Wetlands (2013), as Helen's mother
- The Taste of Apple Seeds (2013), as Harriet
- Lügen und andere Wahrheiten (2014), as Coco
- Mann im Spagat: Pace, Cowboy, Pace (2016), as Lenker Gaby
- A Change in the Weather (2017), as Kalle
- Wer hat eigentlich die Liebe erfunden? (2018), as Alex
- Little Miss Dolittle (2018), as Oberst Essig
- Windstorm 4: Ari's Arrival (2019), as Britta

== Awards ==
- 1995 Bavarian Film Awards, Best Actress for Das Versprechen
- 1998 German Film Awards, Outstanding Individual Achievement: Supporting Actress in Comedian Harmonists
- 2005 Max Ophüls Festival, Film Score Award for Pipermint - Das Leben, möglicherweise OST
