= Alf Brustellin =

Austrian film director

- Born: 27 July 1940; Vienna, Nazi Germany
- Died: 11 November 1981 (aged 41); Munich, West Germany
- Occupations: Film director Screenwriter
- Years active: 1968–1981

Alf Brustellin (27 July 1940 – 11 November 1981) was an Austrian film director and screenwriter. He directed six films between 1972 and 1979. He co-directed the 1978 film Germany in Autumn, which won the Special Recognition Award at the 28th Berlin International Film Festival. Alf Brustellin worked together with Bernhard Sinkel as a director and screenwriter team.

Brustellin was in a relationship with Hannelore Elsner from 1973 until his death. He died in a car accident.

== Selected filmography ==
Director

- Berlinger (1975) (co-director: Bernhard Sinkel)
- Maiden's War (1977) (co-director: Bernhard Sinkel) — (based on a novel by Manfred Bieler)
- Germany in Autumn (anthology film, 1978)
- Der Sturz (1979) — (based on a novel by Martin Walser)

Cinematographer

- Lina Braake (1975)

=== Writer ===
- Kaltgestellt (1980)
