= Rolf Becker =

German actor (1935–2025)

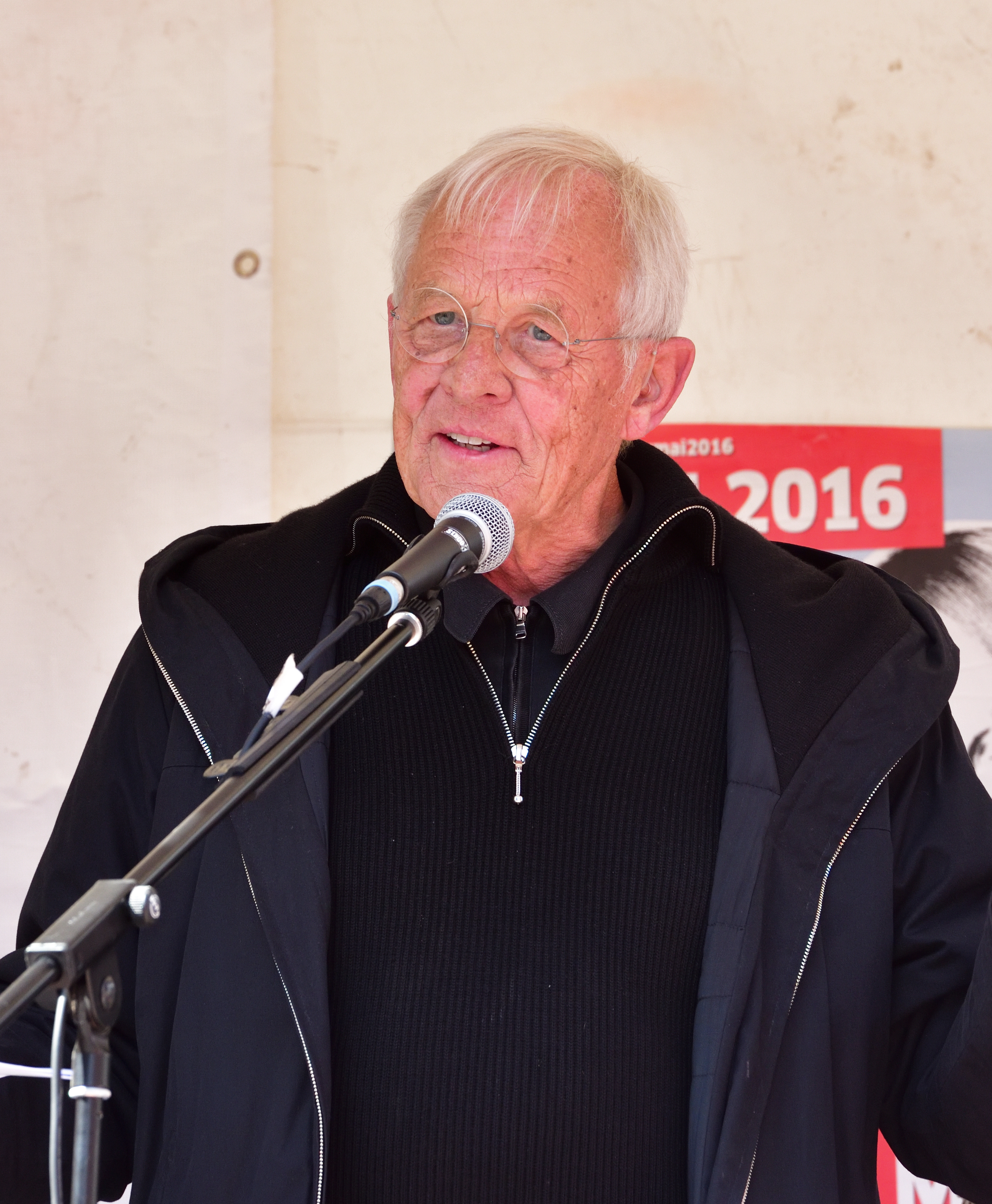
- Becker in 2016
- Born: 31 March 1935; Leipzig, Gau Saxony, Germany
- Died: 12 December 2025 (aged 90); Hamburg, Germany
- Occupation: Actor
- Spouse(s): Monika Hansen (?–1971); Sylvia Wempner (1980)
- Children: 5, including: Ben Becker; Meret Becker

Rolf Becker (31 March 1935 – 12 December 2025) was a German stage, film, television, and voice actor known for his role of Otto Stein in the soap opera In aller Freundschaft.

== Early life and career ==
From 1945 he attended the Alte Gymnasium in Bremen. After graduating from school Becker attended the Otto Falckenberg School of the Performing Arts in Munich from 1956 to 1958 where he studied acting. During his time in education he earned money as a stage technician. His first acting roles were with the Munich Kammerspiele theater company. He also worked at Staatstheater Darmstadt and Theater Ulm before moving to Theater Bremen where he was the opera director.

== Personal life and death ==
By his first wife, actress Monika Hansen, he was the father of actor Ben Becker, and actress and singer Meret Becker. He died in Hamburg on 12 December 2025, at the age of 90.

== Selected filmography ==
- Widower with Five Daughters (1957)
- The Murderer with the Silk Scarf (1966)
- A Handful of Heroes (1967)
- Cardillac (1969)
- I'm an Elephant, Madame (1969)
- A Big Grey-Blue Bird (1970)
- Christmas Not Just Once a Year (1970, TV film)
- I Love You, I Kill You (1971)
- Wallenstein (1978, TV miniseries)
- Derrick – Season 6, Episode 07: "Lena" (1979)
- Derrick – Season 7, Episode 08: "Auf einem Gutshof" (1980)
- Derrick – Season 8, Episode 11: "Die Stunde der Mörder" (1981)
- Blood and Honor: Youth Under Hitler (1982, TV miniseries) (lead role)
- Vom Webstuhl zur Weltmacht (1983, TV series)
- Vor dem Sturm (1984, TV miniseries)
- Gloomy Sunday (1999)
- Heinrich der Säger (2001)
- NimmerMeer (2006)
- Mr. Kaplan (2014)
