= Martin Benrath =

German actor (1926–2000)

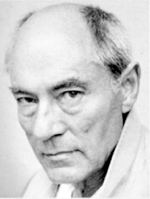
- Born: 9 November 1926; Berlin-Lankwitz, Germany
- Died: 31 January 2000 (aged 73); Bavaria, Germany
- Occupation: Actor
- Years active: 1954–2000

Martin Benrath (9 November 1926 – 31 January 2000) was a German film actor. He appeared in more than 60 films between 1954 and 2000.

== Partial filmography ==
- Meines Vaters Pferde (1954), as Michael Godeysen
- The Angel with the Flaming Sword (1954), as Jürgen Marein
- A Thousand Melodies (1956), as Martin Hoff
- Melody of the Heath (1956), as Ulrich Haagen
- Court Martial (1959), as Funk-Offizier Maiers
- The Ideal Woman (1959), as Axel Jungk
- Morituri (1965), as Kruse
- Eintausend Milliarden (1974)
- Berlinger (1975), as Lukas Berlinger
- When Hitler Stole Pink Rabbit (1978, TV film), as Papa
- The Buddenbrooks (1979, TV miniseries), as Johann Jr.
- Put on Ice (1980), as V-Mann Körner
- From the Life of the Marionettes (1980), as Professor Mogens Jensen
- Die Weiße Rose (1982), as Prof. Kurt Huber
- Väter und Söhne – Eine deutsche Tragödie (1986, TV miniseries), as Bankier Bernheim
- Success (1991), as Dr. Otto Klenk
- Death Came As a Friend (1991, TV film), as Gerhard Selb
- Schtonk! (1992), as Uwe Esser
- Stalingrad (1993), as General Hentz
- Der Kinoerzähler (1993), as Herr Theilhaber
- One More Kiss and He's Dead! (1996), as Thomas Mann
- Widows (1998), as Charles Bernsdorf
- Campus (1998), as Von Zittkau
- Alle für die Mafia (1998)
- Der Laden (1998, TV miniseries), as Grandfather
- Beresina, or the Last Days of Switzerland (1999), as Alt-Divisionär Sturzenegger
- Die Zauberfrau (1999, TV film), as Gustav
