= Väter und Söhne – Eine deutsche Tragödie =

- Written by: Bernhard Sinkel
- Directed by: Bernhard Sinkel
- Starring: Burt Lancaster; Julie Christie; Bruno Ganz; Tina Engel
- Countries of origin: West Germany; Italy
- Original language: German

Production
- Running time: 480 minutes

Original release
- Network: Das Erste; Radiotelevisione Italiana
- Release: 12 November – 23 November 1986

Väter und Söhne – Eine deutsche Tragödie (English title: Fathers and Sons: A German Tragedy) is a 1986 German-language television miniseries directed by Bernhard Sinkel and starring Burt Lancaster, Julie Christie.

== Plot ==
The series explores the lives of two German industrial dynasties, one of Jewish bankers and the other the founders of a chemical empire. For three generations, their plots and plans, loves and betrayals help the rise of Germany and then to total destruction. The Deutz end up in the dock, on trial for war crimes at Nuremberg, while his trusted friends, the Bemheim, with one exception, have been killed.

== Cast ==
Actor	Role
Burt Lancaster	Geheimrat Carl Julius Deutz
Julie Christie	Charlotte Deutz
Bruno Ganz	Heinrich Beck
Laura Morante	Judith Bernheim
Tina Engel	Luise Deutz
Dieter Laser	Friedrich Deutz
Martin Benrath	Bankier Bernheim
Hannes Jaenicke	Max Bernheim
Herbert Grönemeyer	Georg Deutz
Rüdiger Vogler	Ulrich Deutz
