= Tina Engel =

German actress

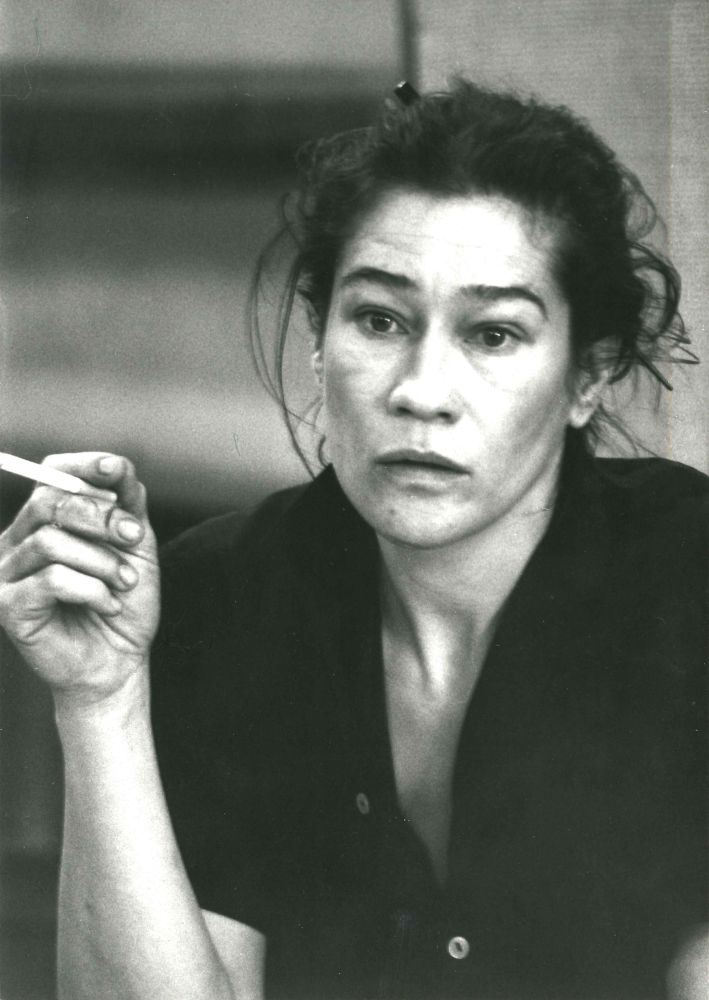
- Tina Engel in 1990
- Born: 6 April 1950 (age 76); Hannover, West Germany
- Occupation: Actress
- Years active: 1975 – present

Tina Engel (born 6 April 1950) is a German actress. She has appeared in 50 films and television shows since 1975. She starred in the 1981 film The Boat Is Full, which was entered into the 31st Berlin International Film Festival, where it won a Silver Bear.

== Selected filmography ==
- The Second Awakening of Christa Klages (1978)
- The Tin Drum (1979)
- The Boat Is Full (1981)
- Väter und Söhne – Eine deutsche Tragödie (TV miniseries) (1986)
- The Promise (1995)
- Ricordare Anna (2004)
- Peas at 5:30 (2004)
- The Coming Days (2010)
