= The Red Spot =

- Directed by: Marie Miyayama
- Written by: Marie Miyayama; Christoph Tomkewitsch
- Produced by: Martin Blankemeyer; Miyako Sonoki
- Starring: Yuki Inomata; Hans Kremer; Orlando Klaus
- Edited by: Marie Miyayama
- Music by: Helmut Sinz
- Release date: 2008
- Running time: 82 minutes
- Countries: Germany; Japan
- Languages: German; Japanese

The Red Spot (original German: Der Rote Punkt, original Japanese: 赤い点) is a 2008 German-Japanese film, marking the feature film debut of writer and director Marie Miyayama, who is the first Japanese student at the University of Television and Film Munich. A Japanese student Aki Onodera travels in her family’s tracks from Tokyo to Germany. In idyllic East Allgäu she meets the Webers, who take her in as their guest. But soon, the situation of the family becomes turbulent by her appearance.

== Plot ==
The young Japanese student Aki Onodera is haunted by dreams of long-lost memories from her early childhood. While she should really be concentrating on finding a job after her studies, instead she goes to her parents’ house and discovers an old package from a foreign land tucked away in a storage closet. An old camera containing film and a yellowed envelope with a letter and a map of a foreign country with a red spot marking a particular location seem to be the key to her dreams.

Despite her parents’ and boyfriend’s apprehension, she travels alone to Germany to look for this place. On her search in the idyllic East Allgaeu area, she goes to the local police station looking for help, where the 18-year-old Elias Weber is being questioned. When Elias’ father comes to the police station to pick him up, the policeman asks him to take the Japanese girl with them, as the place she is looking for is near their house.

Father and son drop Aki off near the edge of a forest and drive home. After dinner, Elias takes off with his sister to pick up his motorcycle from the police station and they run into the Japanese girl, who, drenched from the rain, is desperately looking for a place to stay for the night. They take her into town, and after not being able to find a hotel room, they take her back home with them and offer her their guest room.

The next day, Elias helps Aki look for the location on the map where the red mark is. According to Aki, there is supposed to be a memorial stone there for Aki’s biological family, who died at that spot 18 years ago. Later on that evening, Elias gets into a hefty argument with his father which then turns physical. Elias runs out of the house, followed by his father who already has a guilty conscience about hitting his son. Although it is not her intention, Aki’s presence and the search for the past seem to intensify the tension among the Weber family and finally lead to light being shed on family secret.

When Aki finally finds the spot she has been looking for, everyone involved must come to terms with the past in order to make way for a new beginning...

== Cast ==
- Yuki Inomata
- Hans Kremer
- Orlando Klaus

== Background ==
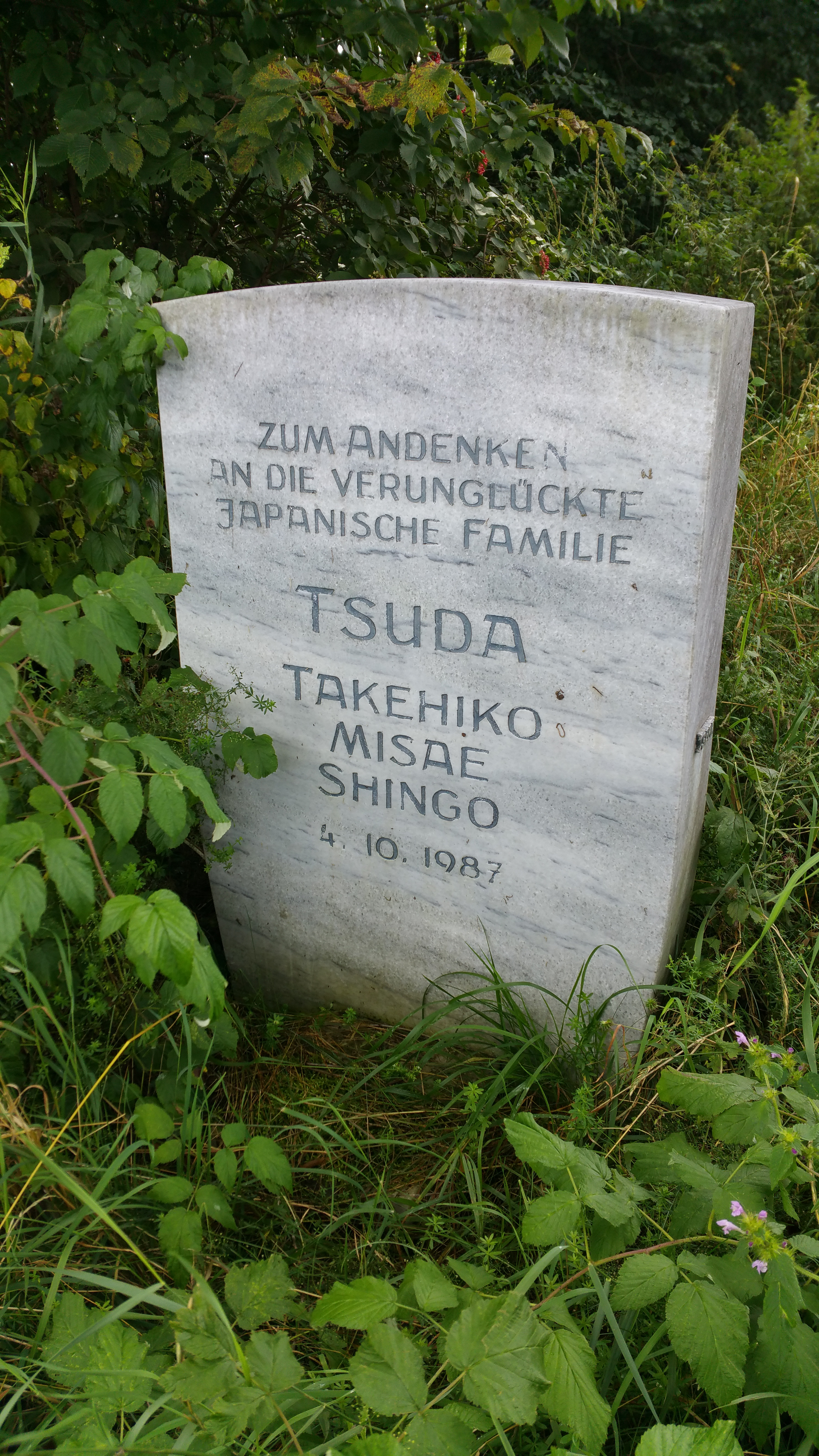
Memorial stone for Japanese family Tsuda near the site of the accident that inspired the script

The script is based on real incident: Father, mother and daughter of the Japanese family Tsuda were killed October 4, 1987 in a hit-and-run accident on Bundesstrasse 17, near the "Red Spot" shown on maps in the movie. Only the little son of the Japanese family survived. The accident perpetrator fled the scene and was never found, the little boy grew up with Japanese relatives. There is a memorial stone by the street where the accident once happened. The memorial stone shown in the film is a different stone, having the same text, but different dates and names on it.

== Production ==
The shooting took place in August and September 2007 in Allgaeu and in October 2007 in Tokyo.

== Festival screenings ==
- Montreal World Film Festival 2008
- Hof International Film Festival 2008
- Cairo International Film Festival 2008
- International Film Festival of India at Goa 2008
