= The Einstein of Sex =

- Theatrical release poster
- German: Der Einstein des Sex
- Directed by: Rosa von Praunheim
- Written by: Chris Kraus; Valentin Passoni
- Starring: Kai Schumann; Friedel von Wangenheim; Otto Sander; Ben Becker; Meret Becker; Wolfgang Völz
- Cinematography: Elfi Mikesch
- Edited by: Mike Shephard
- Music by: Karl-Ernst Sasse
- Release date: 1999
- Country: Germany
- Language: German

The Einstein of Sex (also known as: The Einstein of Sex – Life and Work of Dr. M. Hirschfeld, German title: Der Einstein des Sex) is a 1999 German film by Rosa von Praunheim. The plot follows the life of the Jewish doctor, sexologist, and gay socialist Magnus Hirschfeld.

The film was shown at the Berlin International Film Festival and at the São Paulo International Film Festival in 2000, among others.

== Plot ==
Magnus Hirschfeld made a name for himself as a co-founder of sexology and a founder of the first gay rights organization in 1897. In the film, three of Hirschfeld's closest friends are portrayed: Baron Hermann von Teschenberg (with whom Hirschfeld shares a complicated romance), aide Karl Giese, and Dora "Dörchen" Richter. They establish the Institut für Sexualwissenschaft in Berlin in 1919 and try to keep the institute open during the rise of the Third Reich in the early 1930s. Hirschfeld even gave lectures in the USA while the Nazis condemned his educational work. The Nazis destroyed the Institut in 1933, sending Hirschfeld into permanent exile in France.

== Cast ==
- Friedel von Wangenheim as Dr. M. Hirschfeld
- Ben Becker as Adolf Brand
- Wolfgang Völz as Polizeipräsident
- Otto Sander as Professor Steinach
- Meret Becker as Arbeiterin
- Monika Hansen as Gräfin
- Gerd Lukas Storzer as Baron von Teschenberg
- Olaf Drauschke as Karl Giese
- Tima die Göttliche as Dorchen
- Harald Glitz as Hochzeitsgast
- Ulrich Jackwit as Geheimrat
- Kai Schuhmann as Magnus Hirschfeld (young)

== Awards ==
- 1999: Nomination for the Golden Leopard at the Locarno Festival

== Reception ==
The German magazine Spiegel wrote: "Rapid rise and early suffering, political furor and private disaster, told in a pleasingly conventional way against the political background of the Weimar Republic - a cinematic poetry album of upright feelings."

"And the Nazis had really managed to make Hirschfeld almost forgotten for a long time. Until Rosa von Praunheim shot his film The Einstein of Sex about him in 1999 – and thus rescued him from oblivion." (Berliner Morgenpost)
