= Bernhard Sinkel =

German film director

- Born: 19 January 1940 (age 86); Frankfurt, Germany
- Occupations: Film director, screenwriter
- Years active: 1975–1993

Bernhard Sinkel (born 19 January 1940) is a German film director and screenwriter. He directed seven films between 1975 and 1993. He co-shared the Special Recognition award at the 28th Berlin International Film Festival for the film Germany in Autumn. His film Put on Ice was entered into the 1980 Cannes Film Festival. Bernhard Sinkel worked together with Alf Brustellin as a director and screenwriter team until Brustellin's death 1981.

== Filmography ==
- Lina Braake (1975)
- Berlinger (1975) (co-director: Alf Brustellin)
- Maiden's War (1977) (co-director: Alf Brustellin) — (based on a novel by Manfred Bieler)
- Good-for-Nothing (1978) — (based on Memoirs of a Good-for-Nothing)
- Germany in Autumn (1978)
- Der Sturz (1979) (director: Alf Brustellin) — (based on a novel by Martin Walser)
- Put on Ice (1980)
- The Confessions of Felix Krull (1982, TV miniseries) — (based on Confessions of Felix Krull)
- Väter und Söhne – Eine deutsche Tragödie (1986, TV miniseries)
- Hemingway (1988, TV miniseries) — (biographical miniseries about Ernest Hemingway)
- The Movie Teller (1993) — (based on a novel by Gert Hofmann)
