= Confessions of Felix Krull =

Unfinished novel by Thomas Mann

Confessions of Felix Krull, Confidence Man: The Early Years
- English 1st edition
- Author: Thomas Mann
- Original title: Bekenntnisse des Hochstaplers Felix Krull. Der Memoiren erster Teil
- Language: German
- Genre: Novel
- Publication date: 1954
- Publication place: Germany
- English publication date: 1955
- Media type: Print (hardback & paperback)
- ISBN: 0-679-73904-1
- OCLC: 25200982
- Dewey Decimal: 833/.912 20
- LC Class: PT2625.A44 B313 1992

Confessions of Felix Krull (German: Bekenntnisse des Hochstaplers Felix Krull) is an unfinished 1954 novel by the German author Thomas Mann.

== Synopsis ==
The novel is narrated by the protagonist, an impostor and adventurer named Felix Krull, the son of a ruined Rhineland winemaker. Felix avoids military service and makes his way to France, where he takes a job in a prestigious hotel, first as an elevator operator, then as a waiter. Deftly using his natural charm, good looks, and subtle intelligence, the young man easily wins the heart of a rich writer, as well as part of her money. Later, Krull meets the young Marquis de Venosta and undertakes to help him in his love affairs; he substitutes for the Marquis on a trip around the world.

== Background ==
The novel is a parody of Goethe's autobiography Poetry and Truth, particularly in its pompous tone. The original title is Bekenntnisse des Hochstaplers Felix Krull. Der Memoiren, erster Teil, translated a year later in English as Confessions of Felix Krull, Confidence Man: The Early Years.

Poster art for the 1957 German film adaption of the Confessions of Felix Krull, starring Horst Buchholz as Felix

Mann had planned the novel since 1905, being inspired by the Romanian con artist Georges Manolescu's autobiographies Fürst der Diebe (A Prince of Thieves) and Gescheitert (Failed). Originally the character of Felix Krull appeared in a short story written in 1911. The story was not published until 1936, in the book Stories of Three Decades, along with 23 other stories written between 1896 and 1929, the year in which he was awarded the Nobel Prize for Literature. In later life, Mann expanded the story and managed to finish and publish part one of the Confessions of Felix Krull but due to his death in 1955, the saga of Felix, the morally flexible and irresistible conman, remains unfinished.

== Adaptations ==
The book was adapted into a film in 1957, with a screenplay by Erika Mann and Robert Thoeren, directed by Kurt Hoffmann, and starring Horst Buchholz as Krull alongside Liselotte Pulver. A spoken word adaptation of chapters 1, 2, 3 and 5 from the first book (dem Buch der Kindheit) of Felix Krull performed by O.E. Hasse, was included as a companion disk to the 1965 Teldec (Telefunken-Decca) release of Schwere Stunde (performed by Thomas Mann).

A television miniseries was directed in 1982 by Bernhard Sinkel, starring John Moulder-Brown. The novel was made into a movie again in 2021, directed by Detlev Buck, who also co-wrote the screenplay with Daniel Kehlmann. Jannis Niewöhner starred as Felix.
