= Boundaries of Time: Caspar David Friedrich =

1986 fim directed by Peter Schamoni

Boundaries of Time: Caspar David Friedrich (German: Caspar David Friedrich. Grenzen der Zeit) is a 1986 West German film directed by Peter Schamoni. It is about the painter Caspar David Friedrich (1774 – 1840) and set immediately after his death, portraying him through his family and friends. It is described as a "documentary film with acted plot".

It received the German Film Award for Best Cinematography.
