= Leila Vennewitz =

Canadian-English translator of German literature

Leila Vennewitz (1912 – 8 August 2007) was a Canadian-English translator of German literature. She was born Leila Croot in Hampshire, England and grew up in Portsmouth. Her brother was the surgeon Sir John Croot.

She studied at the Sorbonne in Paris, continuing her studies in Germany and China, where she spent twelve years. She is best known today for her translations of the works of Heinrich Böll, the Nobel Prize-winning German novelist. She also translated the works of Martin Walser, Uwe Johnson, Hermann Hesse, Nicolas Born, Alexander Kluge, Friedrich Dürrenmatt, Jurek Becker, Uwe Timm, Walter Kempowski and Alfred Andersch.

Her notable translations include:

Heinrich Böll:

- Billiards at Half-Past Nine (1962)
- The Clown (1965)
- End of a Mission (Ende einer Dienstfahrt) - Schlegel-Tieck Prize from the Society of Authors, London (1968)
- Group Portrait with Lady (1973)
- The Train Was on Time (1973)
- The Lost Honor of Katharina Blum (1975)
- The Bread of Those Early Years (1976)
- And Never Said a Word (Und sagte kein einziges Wort) - Goethe House P.E.N. Prize from the American Center of P.E.N. (1979)
- A Soldier's Legacy (Das Vermächtnis) (1981)

Other:

- Alexander Kluge: Attendance List for a Funeral, later reprinted as Case Histories (Lebensläufe) (1966; 1988)
- Alexander Kluge: The Battle (Schlachtbeschreibung) (1967)
- Alfred Andersch: The Father of a Murderer (Der Vater eines Mörders) (1994)
- Friedrich Dürrenmatt - Oedipus (1989)
- Hermann Hesse: Narcissus and Goldmund (Narziss und Goldmund) - shortlisted for the Schlegel-Tieck Prize (1994)
- Jurek Becker: Jacob the Liar (Jakob der Lügner)- Helen and Kurt Wolff Translator’s Prize (1997)
- Martin Walser: Breakers (Brandung) - German Literary Prize from the American Translators Association (1989)
- Nicolas Born: The Deception (1983)
- Uwe Johnson: Anniversaries: From the Life of Gesine Cresspahl (1975) (abridged translation of Volume 1 and part of Volume 2 of Jahrestage)
- Uwe Johnson: Anniversaries II (1987) (abridged translation of part of Volume 2 and all of Volume 3, with Walter Arndt completing Volume 4 of Jahrestage)
- Uwe Timm: The Invention of Curried Sausage (1995)
- Walter Kempowski: Days of Greatness (1981)

Vennewitz was married twice. She spent the last 50 years of her life in Vancouver, British Columbia, Canada. Her posthumous papers are stored at Indiana University.
