= Calm at Sea =

2011 film

- Film poster
- French: La mer à l'aube
- Directed by: Volker Schlöndorff
- Written by: Volker Schlöndorff
- Based on: Zur Geiselfrage by Ernst Jünger
- Produced by: Bruno Petit
- Starring: Léo Paul Salmain; Marc Barbé; Ulrich Matthes
- Cinematography: Lubomir Bakchev
- Edited by: Susanne Hartmann
- Music by: Bruno Coulais
- Release date: 14 October 2011
- Running time: 90 minutes
- Countries: France; Germany
- Languages: French; German

Calm at Sea (French: La mer à l'aube) is a 2011 German / French drama film directed by Volker Schlöndorff. The film depicts the events leading to the 1941 execution of a group of French communists, including the 17-year-old Guy Môquet, as retaliation for the assassination of a German officer by the French resistance.

== Cast ==
- Léo-Paul Salmain as Guy Môquet
- Marc Barbé as Jean-Pierre Timbaud
- Ulrich Matthes as Ernst Jünger
- Jean-Marc Roulot as Lucien Touya
- Sébastien Accart as Bernard Lecornu
- Martin Loizillon as Claude Lalet
- Jacob Matschenz as Soldat Otto

== Production ==
The film was inspired by the experiences of the German writers Ernst Jünger and Heinrich Böll, who served in France during World War II. Jünger, who features as a character in the film, was tasked by Otto von Stülpnagel, the German Military Commander in France, to treat the executions of the French prisoners in literary form. Jünger did so, but destroyed his manuscript and the text was presumed lost until a copy was found and published posthumously as Zur Geiselfrage. Schilderung der Fälle und ihrer Auswirkungen (lit. 'On the Hostage Issue: Description of the Cases and Their Ramifications'). Böll's stories A Soldier's Legacy and The Train Was on Time are not about these events, but there is a soldier in the film modelled on Böll and his literary characters.

Scenes for the Camp de Choisel were shot on the military base in Montlhéry (Essonne). The film was also partially shot in Nantes, Lavau-sur-Loire and Préfailles from April to May 2011.

== Reception ==
The film was mostly positively received. Jörg Schöning sums it up in Der Spiegel: "Schlöndorff's film, which is not particularly interested in Jünger's questions of humanity, thankfully concentrates on the concrete. The sea in the morning is the stroke of luck of a documentary game: the people, their actions and words are historically documented, the consequences of their actions are highly dramatic - and still trigger considerable emotions today."

Filmgazette editor Wolfgang Nierlins judged: "Schlöndorff's film shows the fateful course of events, relentlessly aggravated by human arbitrariness and blind coincidence as a tragic event." He understands Calm at Sea as "a differentiated plea for humanity" and awards 8 out of 10 possible stars.
