= Rerik =

Town in Mecklenburg-Vorpommern, Germany

- Town
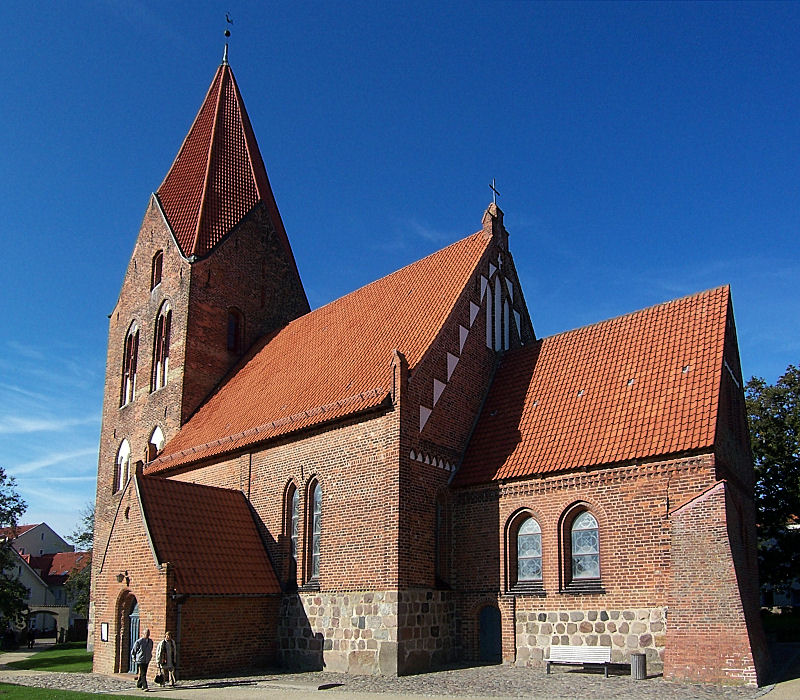
- Church

- Flag Coat of arms

- Location of Rerik within Rostock district
- Interactive map of Rerik
- Location within Germany Location within Mecklenburg-Vorpommern
- Coordinates: 54°6′N 11°37′E
- Country: Germany
- State: Mecklenburg-Vorpommern
- District: Rostock
- Municipal assoc.: Neubukow-Salzhaff

Government
  - Mayor: Wolfgang Gulbis (SPD)

Area
  - Total: 34.22 km^{2} (13.21 sq mi)
- Elevation: 10 m (33 ft)

Population (2025-12-31)
  - Total: 2,199
  - Density: 64.26/km^{2} (166.4/sq mi)
- Time zone: UTC+01:00 (CET)
  - Summer (DST): UTC+02:00 (CEST)
- Postal codes: 18230
- Dialling codes: 038296
- Vehicle registration: LRO, BÜZ, DBR, GÜ, ROS, TET
- Website: www.rerik.de

Rerik (German pronunciation: [ˈʁeːʁɪk]; formerly Alt-Gaarz) is a town in the Rostock district, in Mecklenburg-Western Pomerania, Germany. It is situated on the Baltic Sea coast, 19 km west of Bad Doberan, and 27 km northeast of Wismar. In 1938, Rerik was named after the old Slavic-Scandinavian settlement Reric, that was believed to have been situated near present Rerik.

It is the setting for Alfred Andersch's debut novel, Flight to Afar (1957).

== Rerik West ==
Rerik West, on a peninsula separated from the town itself by a small isthmus, was a military townlet (barracks town) for Soviet forces during the time of the German Democratic Republic. Following German reunification, it was abandoned in 1992 and declared a restricted area due to contamination by unexploded munitions. It is now a ghost town, and has become a haven for wildlife.

== Notable people ==
- Wolfgang Hillebrandt (born 1944), astrophysicist
