= Group Portrait with Lady =

Group Portrait with Lady (German: Gruppenbild mit Dame) can refer to:

- Group Portrait with Lady (novel), a novel by Heinrich Böll
- Group Portrait with Lady (film), a 1977 film based on the novel, directed by Aleksandar Petrović
