= The Bread of Those Early Years =

The Bread of Those Early Years may refer to:

- The Bread of Those Early Years (novel), a 1955 novella by Heinrich Böll
- The Bread of Those Early Years (film), a 1962 West German film, based on the novel
