= The Lost Honour of Katharina Blum (film) =

1975 German film

- German: Die Verlorene Ehre der Katharina Blum oder: Wie Gewalt entstehen und wohin sie führen kann
- Directed by: Volker Schlöndorff; Margarethe von Trotta
- Screenplay by: Volker Schlöndorff; Margarethe von Trotta
- Based on: The Lost Honour of Katharina Blum (1974 novel) by Heinrich Böll
- Produced by: Willi Benninger; Eberhard Junkersdorf; Gunther Witte
- Starring: Angela Winkler; Mario Adorf; Dieter Laser; Jürgen Prochnow
- Cinematography: Jost Vacano
- Edited by: Peter Przygodda
- Music by: Hans Werner Henze
- Distributed by: Cinema International Corporation
- Release dates: 17 September 1975 (San Sebastián); 10 October 1975 (West Germany)
- Running time: 106 minutes
- Country: West Germany
- Language: German

The Lost Honour of Katharina Blum, or: How violence develops and where it can lead (German: Die Verlorene Ehre der Katharina Blum oder: Wie Gewalt entstehen und wohin sie führen kann) is a 1975 West German political drama film written and directed by Volker Schlöndorff and Margarethe von Trotta. It is based on Heinrich Böll's 1974 novel, about the vindictive and harsh treatment of an innocent woman by the public, police, and media. It stars Angela Winkler, Mario Adorf, Dieter Laser, and Jürgen Prochnow.

== Plot ==
Katharina Blum is a young divorcee who works as a housekeeper for a famous corporate lawyer, Hubert Blorna, and his wife, Trude. She is nicknamed "the nun" for her prudish lifestyle, but at a carnival party she meets and quickly falls in love with Ludwig Götten, whom police have been following, suspecting him of being an anarchist, a bank robber, and a terrorist. The police raid Katharina's apartment but fail to find Götten, so they search the flat, discovering an expensive ring, then arrest her and interrogate her harshly as they believe she aided and abetted her lover. She does not cooperate and is soon released, but the police continue investigating her associates and finances, occasionally leaking damning details to the press.

Katharina's life is turned upside down by an invasive reporter, Werner Tötges, who works for a tabloid, The Paper. The Paper prints lie after lie, and Katharina receives obscene anonymous phone calls and notes. After Tötges visits Katharina's mother, who is recovering from surgery in the hospital, her mother dies. He fabricates her last words in his newspaper to give the impression that she despised her daughter with her dying breath. This upsets Katharina greatly. She trashes her apartment and moves in with her aunt, then calls Götten, but police trace the call.

Götten is wounded and captured. Katharina had allowed him to hide out at the country villa of Alois Sträubleder, a political leader who was pursuing her romantically and had given her the key to his villa as well as the expensive ring. It turns out that Ludwig was not a bank robber but instead a deserter from the Bundeswehr who stole two regiments' pay. Unable to find justice for herself or end the bad publicity, Katharina offers Tötges an interview, then shoots and kills him and his photographer. Later, Katharina and Ludwig passionately embrace for a moment as they pass each other in the basement of the jail where they are being held.

In an epilogue, at Tötges's funeral, his editor delivers a hypocritical speech about how his murder was an attack on democracy and freedom of the press. The film's final image is a block of text that appears over Tötges' funeral wreath and casket, linking the film's depiction of The Paper's yellow journalism to the practices of the German tabloid Bild-Zeitung. (This text also appears at the beginning of Böll's book.) It reads:

The characters and action in this story are purely fictitious. Should the description of certain journalistic practices result in a resemblance to the practices of Bild-Zeitung, such resemblance is neither intentional nor accidental, but unavoidable.

== Cast ==
- Angela Winkler as Katharina Blum
- Mario Adorf as Kommissar Beizmenne
- Dieter Laser as Werner Tötges
- Jürgen Prochnow as Ludwig Götten
- Heinz Bennent as Dr. Hubert Blorna
- Hannelore Hoger as Trude Blorna
- Rolf Becker as Prosecutor Hach
- Harald Kuhlmann as Moeding
- Herbert Fux as Weninger
- Regine Lutz as Else Woltersheim
- Werner Eichhorn as Konrad Beiters
- Karl Heinz Vosgerau as Alois Sträubleder
- Angelika Hillbrecht as Frau Pletzer
- Horatius Häberle as Dr. Korten
- Henry van Lyck as Karl
- Stephanie Thönnessen as Claudia Sterm
- Peter Franke as Dr. Heinen

== Analysis ==
Produced during a time of political controversy in West Germany, when journalists would stop at nothing to get their names known, the film digs deep into human rights violations in what should be a peaceful, democratic country, and shines a light on the vindictive nature of the tabloid press and its tendency to spread lies and distort facts. The film also clearly condemns collusion between the police and the yellow press. Unlike the novel, the film ends with a scene at Tötges's funeral, with his publisher delivering a hypocritical condemnation of the murder as an infringement of freedom of the press.

In interviews for the 2003 Criterion Collection DVD release of the film, Schlöndorff and other crew members argue for the film's continued relevance today, drawing an analogy between the political climate of panic over terrorism in 1970s West Germany and the post-9/11 situation in the U.S., when unsubstantiated media hype was used to launch the invasion of Iraq. Schlöndorff recounts that years later, when he and Von Trotta were visiting Tashkent, they noticed a theater where this movie was playing. They entered at the scene where the prosecutor and the police throw themselves onto the ground after hearing one of their own guns accidentally going off. The bureaucrats are the first to be scared of their own weapons. Schlöndorff was happy that this message could be appreciated by people under Uzbekistan's authoritarian government just as by West Germans.

Though the film ends with a journalist being shot, Schlöndorff considers this only a "metaphorical shooting" and believes that Böll opposes violence.

== Cinematography ==
This film has a documentary style, with little lighting or special effects. The camera is largely stationary. There is only one crane shot, in the final scene at Tötges's funeral. Cinematographer Jost Vacano felt this would make it easier to get into the audience's heads. The opening scene on the barge was shot on 16 mm film to make it seem like grainy camera footage. The film was shot during carnival season and uses many bright, vibrant colors, but as the film progresses it becomes darker to reflect Katharina's pain. Vacano considered this one of his most important films, even more than American releases like Total Recall or Starship Troopers, because of the political message and his cinematographic choices. The film has appeared on television many times since its release, which according to Vacano shows that its message will always be relevant.

The film uses almost no makeup. Vacano wanted the viewer to see Katharina's skin imperfections and feel she was a real person.

Angela Winkler was said to have done her acting best on the first or second take, while Mario Adorf was best on the seventh or eighth take. Multiple takes got him better into the character.

The sets are intentionally abstract. Police offices are intentionally depicted as large open spaces with empty desks, which was not the case in West Germany at the time. This abstract, empty set design was influenced by the American painter Allen Tucker.

== Score ==
Hans Werner Henze chose Wagnerian themes for his score. The opening scene takes place at the Rhine River, so Henze wrote themes influenced by Das Rheingold. He called it "the poisoned river" because the dirty water was a metaphor for a toxic German society. The music is a bit disjointed at times to reflect this. Many of the musical themes are brought together in a rondo at the end.

== Historical context ==
Following the kidnapping and execution of a West German corporate leader, Hanns Martin Schleyer, and several other prison deaths, The Lost Honour of Katharina Blum reflects the conflicts in West Germany during the 1960s and 1970s, when student movements and a political struggle were occurring. Militant terrorists such as the Red Army Faction (the Baader-Meinhof Group) had holds in the government and their violent tendencies soon made citizens question their government as reforms began to turn into repressions. Some of these repressions had brutally destructive consequences, which the film blatantly opposes. Radicalism was confused with terrorism and fear was present in almost all citizens because of the political reforms and repressions the country had undergone.

This was a period when media coverage was expanding and journalism was becoming one of the most popular careers. Journalists were ruthless about digging for stories. Police were not afraid to become violent, emotionally or physically. Witnesses and suspects seldom had a voice. The film explores the vindictive nature of the media and police, and the abuse of power, discrimination, and emotional abuse. The Paper has no qualms with libel, slander, or making up quotes to get the story it wants.

== See also ==
- The Lost Honor of Kathryn Beck - A 1984 American adaptation produced for television.
