= Rudolf Steiner (film director) =

German film director, scriptwriter, and producer

Rudolf Steiner (born 1942), is a German film director, scriptwriter, and producer.

Steiner studied at the Film & Television Academy (HFF) "Konrad Wolf" in Potsdam-Babelsberg. From 1971 to 1973 he worked as a cameraman for Sender Freies Berlin (SFB).

As a producer he realized among other films Conversation with the Beast (director: Armin Mueller-Stahl).

== Filmography ==
- 1987: Our Man in the Jungle
- 1988: 5 Beers + 1 Coffee
- 1995: Einsteins Baby
- 1996: Conversation with the Beast
- 1999: Cross-Eyed
