= The Lost Honour of Katharina Blum =

1974 novel by Heinrich Böll

The Lost Honour of Katharina Blum or: How violence develops and where it can lead
- First edition
- Author: Heinrich Böll
- Original title: Die verlorene Ehre der Katharina Blum oder: Wie Gewalt entstehen und wohin sie führen kann
- Translator: Leila Vennewitz
- Publisher: Kiepenheuer & Witsch
- Publication date: 1974
- Media type: Print (hardback & paperback)
- ISBN: 3462010336
- OCLC: 59145306

The Lost Honour of Katharina Blum, or: how violence develops and where it can lead (original German title: Die verlorene Ehre der Katharina Blum oder: Wie Gewalt entstehen und wohin sie führen kann, pronounced [diː fɐˈloːʁənə ˈʔeːʁə deːɐ̯ kataˈʁiːnaː ˈbluːm ˈʔoːdɐ viː ɡəˈvalt ʔɛntˈʃteːən ʔʊnt voˈhɪn ziː ˈfyːʁən ˈkan]) is a 1974 novel by Heinrich Böll.

The story deals with the sensationalism of tabloid news and the political climate of panic over Red Army Faction terrorism in the 1970s in the Federal Republic of Germany. The main character, Katharina Blum, is an innocent housekeeper whose life is ruined by an invasive tabloid reporter and a police investigation when the man with whom she has just fallen in love turns out to be wanted by the police because of a bank robbery. The book's fictional tabloid paper, Die Zeitung (The Newspaper), is modelled on the actual German Bild-Zeitung.

== Plot ==
Four days after a Fat Thursday's eve party (Wed. February the 20th, 1974), where Katharina Blum met a man named Ludwig Götten, she calls on chief inspector Moeding, and confesses to killing the journalist Tötges of the tabloid Die Zeitung.

Katharina had spent the night with Götten, not realising he was wanted for bank robbery and murder, before helping him to escape from the police. The next morning, the police break into her house, arrest her and question her. The story is sensationally covered by Die Zeitung, in particular by the journalist Tötges. Tötges investigates everything about her life, calling on Katharina's friends and family, including her ex-husband and hospitalized mother, who dies the day after Tötges visits her. He paints a picture of Katharina as a fervent accomplice of Götten, and as a communist run amok in Germany. The book chronicles Katharina's progressive mental breakdown as her image (and honour) is destroyed and she is publicly slandered.

Katharina arranges an interview with Tötges. According to Katharina, upon his arrival he suggests that they have sex, whereupon she shoots him dead. She then wanders the city for a few hours before driving to police headquarters and confessing to murder.

The book concludes as Katharina is charged with homicide. It is revealed that Ludwig's case was exaggerated by the press similarly to Katharina's, having simply deserted the army.

The book also details the effects of the case on Katharina's employers and friends the Blornas; Mr Blorna is her lawyer, and Mrs Blorna one of the designers of the apartment block where Katharina resides. Their association with Katharina leads to their exclusion from society.

== Style ==
The story is written from a first-person plural perspective, as if the narrator were presenting a confidential report to the reader on the basis of sources. The technique is documentary, as with Group Portrait with Lady, but with a much more disciplined focus on essentials. The reader is sometimes left to infer who the sources are for many of the reports, and even to wonder whether the narrator may not be one of the characters in the novel. This way, the narrator is dependent on characters and the information they impart, becoming a researcher and critic of his source material. This is implicitly contrasted with the journalists who irresponsibly distort their sources. The attack on vulgar journalism is thus mounted from the perspective of a narrator whose moral authority is enhanced by the use of the 'regal' first-person plural form. In some parts of the story, the elaborate and detached manner is also used for comic effect when retelling violent, silly or emotionally conflicted incidents as more and more personal secrets of the characters are revealed.

== Adaptations ==
The book has been adapted into the following works:

- The Lost Honour of Katharina Blum, a 1975 film adaptation of Böll's novel directed by Volker Schlöndorff and Margarethe von Trotta and starring Angela Winkler as Blum, Mario Adorf as Kommissar Beizmenne, Dieter Laser as Tötges and Jürgen Prochnow as Ludwig
- The Lost Honor of Kathryn Beck, a 1984 American TV movie starring Marlo Thomas as Beck and Kris Kristofferson as Ben Cole
- Heinrich Böll - The Lost Honour of Katharina Blum, a radio dramatisation in five parts broadcast as the 15 Minute Drama of the week (formerly the Woman's Hour Drama) on BBC Radio Four for the week commencing 15 October 2012
- Katharina Blum, an opera adaptation by Tilo Medek to a libretto by his wife Dorothea based on the Böll novel, which premiered at the Theater Bielefeld on 20 April 1991

== See also ==
- Le Monde's 100 Books of the Century
