= Tolm =

Tolm may refer to:

- Tolm., taxonomic author abbreviation for Alexandr Innokentevich Tolmatchew (1903–1979), Soviet botanist
- Tolm, family name of the central characters of the 1979 Heinrich Böll novel, The Safety Net
- Tolm, Scottish Gaelic name for the village of Holm, Lewis

== See also ==
- Tolm ja Tuul, 1993 novel by Eeva Park
