= Herbert Vesely =

Austrian film director

- Born: 31 March 1931; Vienna, Austria
- Died: 13 July 2002 (aged 71); Munich, Germany
- Occupations: Film director Screenwriter
- Years active: 1955-1988

Herbert Vesely (31 March 1931 – 13 July 2002) was an Austrian film director and screenwriter. He directed 17 films between 1955 and 1988.

== Selected filmography ==
- Nicht mehr fliehen (1955)
- The Bread of Those Early Years (1962) — (based on the novel The Bread of Those Early Years)
- Your Caresses (co-director: Peter Schamoni, 1969) — (based on a novel by Esteban Eulogio López)
- Das Bastardzeichen (1970, TV film) — (based on the novel Bend Sinister)
- Ulla oder Die Flucht in die schwarzen Wälder (1974, TV film)
- Münchner Geschichten (1974–1975, TV series, 3 episodes)
- Depression (1975, TV film) — (based on a book by Caroline Muhr)
- Der kurze Brief zum langen Abschied (1978, TV film) — (based on the novel Short Letter, Long Farewell)
- Egon Schiele – Exzess und Bestrafung (1980)
- Plaza Real (1988)
