= Anekdote zur Senkung der Arbeitsmoral =

- Short story by Heinrich Böll
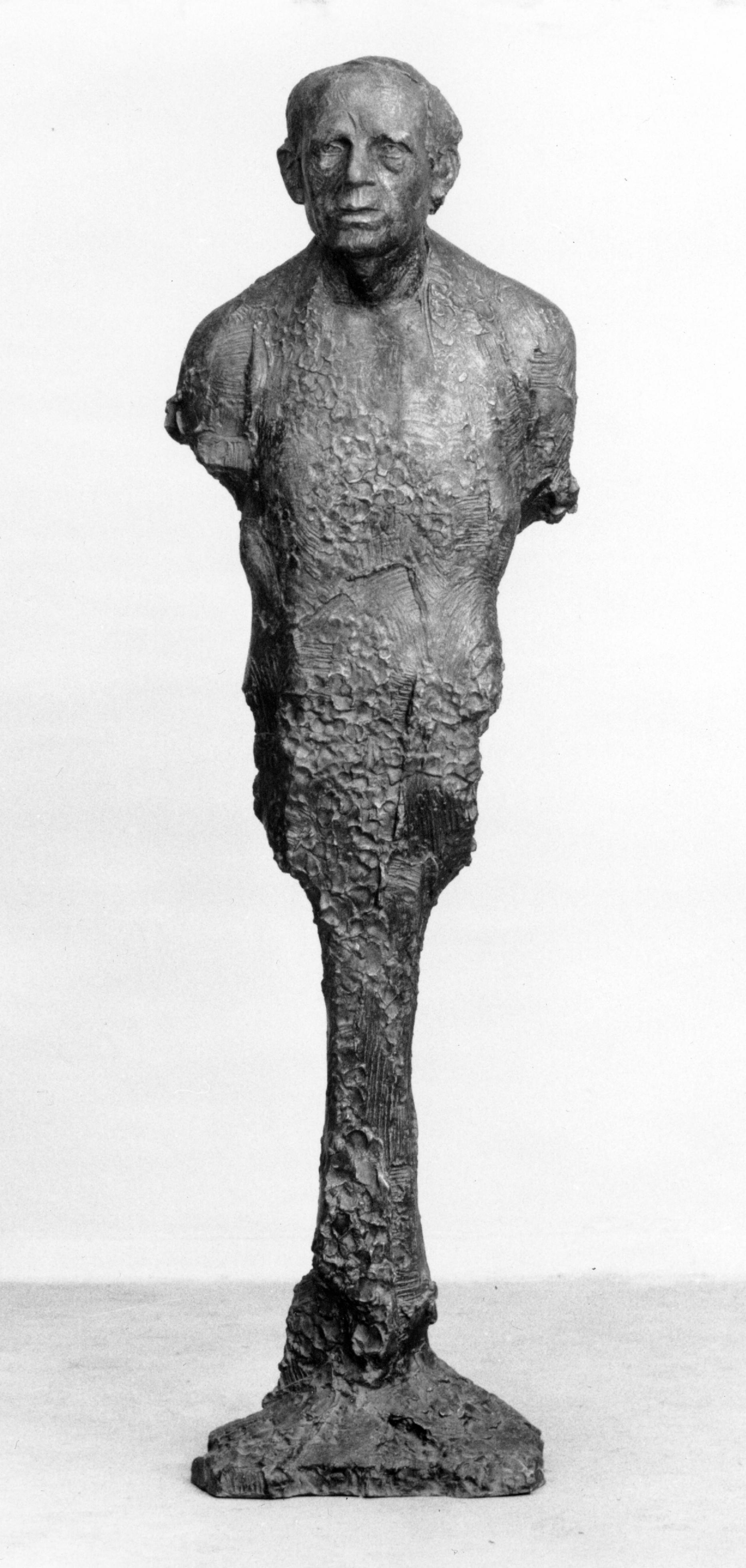
- Statue of Heinrich Böll
- Translator: Leila Vennewitz
- Country: Germany
- Language: German
- Genre: satire

Publication
- Publisher: Norddeutscher Rundfunk
- Publication date: 1963

"Anekdote zur Senkung der Arbeitsmoral" ("Anecdote on Lowering the Work Ethic") is a short story by Heinrich Böll about an encounter between an enterprising tourist and a small fisherman, in which the tourist suggests how the fisherman can improve his life. It was written for a Labour Day programme on the Norddeutscher Rundfunk in 1963, and is considered one of the best stories written by Böll.

== Plot ==
The story is set in an unnamed harbor on the west coast of Europe. A smartly-dressed enterprising tourist is taking photographs when he notices a shabbily dressed local fisherman taking a nap in his fishing boat. The tourist is disappointed with the fisherman's apparently lazy attitude towards his work, so he approaches the fisherman and asks him why he is lying around instead of catching fish. The fisherman explains that he went fishing in the morning, and the small catch would be sufficient for the next two days.

The tourist tells him that if he goes out to catch fish multiple times a day, he would be able to buy a motor in less than a year, a second boat in less than two years, and so on. The tourist further explains that one day, the fisherman could even build a small cold storage plant, later a pickling factory, fly around in a helicopter, build a fish restaurant, and export lobster directly to Paris without a middleman.

The nonchalant fisherman asks, "Then what?"

The tourist enthusiastically continues, "Then, without a care in the world, you could sit here in the harbor, doze in the sun, and look at the glorious sea."

"But I'm already doing that", says the fisherman.

The enlightened tourist walks away pensively, with no trace of pity for the fisherman, only a little envy.

== Popularity ==
The story, with its several adaptions, has been circulated widely on the Internet, and has been quoted in many books and scholarly papers. In one of the most popular versions, the tourist is an American (an MBA from Harvard in some versions), and the fisherman is Mexican.

The story is also part of the syllabi of several universities. It is often quoted in texts that discuss the relationship between money and happiness, and has been included in textbooks teaching the German language.

== See also ==
- Pyrrhus and Cineas, a philosophical essay by Simone de Beauvoir, which features a similar conversation: Cineas asks Pyrrhus why he does not rest now instead of going through all the trouble of conquering empires, when his ultimate plan is to rest after the final conquest. The anecdote originally appeared in Parallel Lives by Plutarch.
