= Breon Mitchell =

American professor of Germanic Studies and translator

- Born: 1942 (age 83–84); Salina, Kansas
- Education: DPhil
- Alma mater: University of Kansas (B.A., 1964); Oxford University (Dr phil, 1968)
- Occupations: Professor, literary translator
- Spouse: Lynda Mitchell
- Children: Catherine Smith, Kieron Mitchell, Kerry Mitchell
- Writing career
- Language: English
- Subjects: Comparative Literature and Germanic Studies
- Notable works: Translation of "The Trial" and "The Tin Drum"

Breon Mitchell (born Bert Breon Mitchell; 1942) is an American scholar, literary translator and bibliographer. He was Professor of Comparative Literature and Germanic Studies, and Director of the Lilly Library, at Indiana University. He was a founding member of the American Literary Translators Association and served as president in its early years. He has translated numerous major works from the German by such authors as Franz Kafka (The Trial), Günter Grass (The Tin Drum), Heinrich Böll (The Silent Angel), Siegfried Lenz (Selected Stories), and Uwe Timm (Morenga). Mitchell translated and then revised What Must Be Said by Grass in April 2012. Among his awards are the ATA's Ungar Prize, the ALTA Translation Prize, the Kurt and Helen Wolff Prize, the MLA's Aldo and Jeanne Scaglione Prize, the British Society of Authors’ Schlegel-Tieck Prize, and the Banff Centre's Linda Gaboriau Prize.

== Personal life ==
Breon Mitchell was born on August 9, 1942, in Salina, Kansas to John Charles II and Maxine Mitchell. He survives two brothers, John Charles III and Timothy. He has three children with his wife Lynda: Catherine Smith, Kieron Mitchell, and Kerry Mitchell. Breon lives in Bloomington, Indiana. He retired from Indiana University in early 2013, and there received the President's Distinguished Service Medal award. He enjoys collecting rare books.
