= Not Reconciled =

1965 film

- Film poster
- Directed by: Jean-Marie Straub
- Screenplay by: Jean-Marie Straub; Danièle Huillet
- Based on: Billiards at Half-past Nine by Heinrich Böll
- Cinematography: Christian Blackwood; Gerhard Ries; Wendelin Sachtler; Jean-Marie Straub
- Edited by: Jean-Marie Straub; Danièle Huillet
- Release date: 4 July 1965 (Berlinale)
- Running time: 55 minutes
- Country: West Germany
- Language: German

Not Reconciled (German: Nicht versöhnt) is a 1965 West German drama film directed by Jean-Marie Straub. It has the subtitle Only Violence Helps Where Violence Reigns (German: Es hilft nur Gewalt wo Gewalt herrscht). The film is an adaptation of the 1959 novel Billiards at Half-past Nine by Heinrich Böll.

== Reception ==
Richard Brody of The New Yorker reviewed the film in 2008: "Straub and Huillet make the layers of history live in the present tense, which they judge severely. The tamped-down acting and the spare, tense visual rhetoric suggest a state of moral crisis as well as the response—as much in style as in substance—that it demands."
