= Flight to Afar =

1957 novel by Alfred Andersch

- Author: Alfred Andersch
- Original title: Sansibar oder der letzte Grund
- Translator: Michael Bullock
- Language: German
- Publisher: Walter Verlag
- Publication date: 1957
- Publication place: Switzerland
- English publication date: 23 September 1958
- Pages: 212

Flight to Afar (German: Sansibar oder der letzte Grund) is a 1957 novel by the German writer Alfred Andersch. It was published in English in 1958, translated by Michael Bullock.

== Plot ==
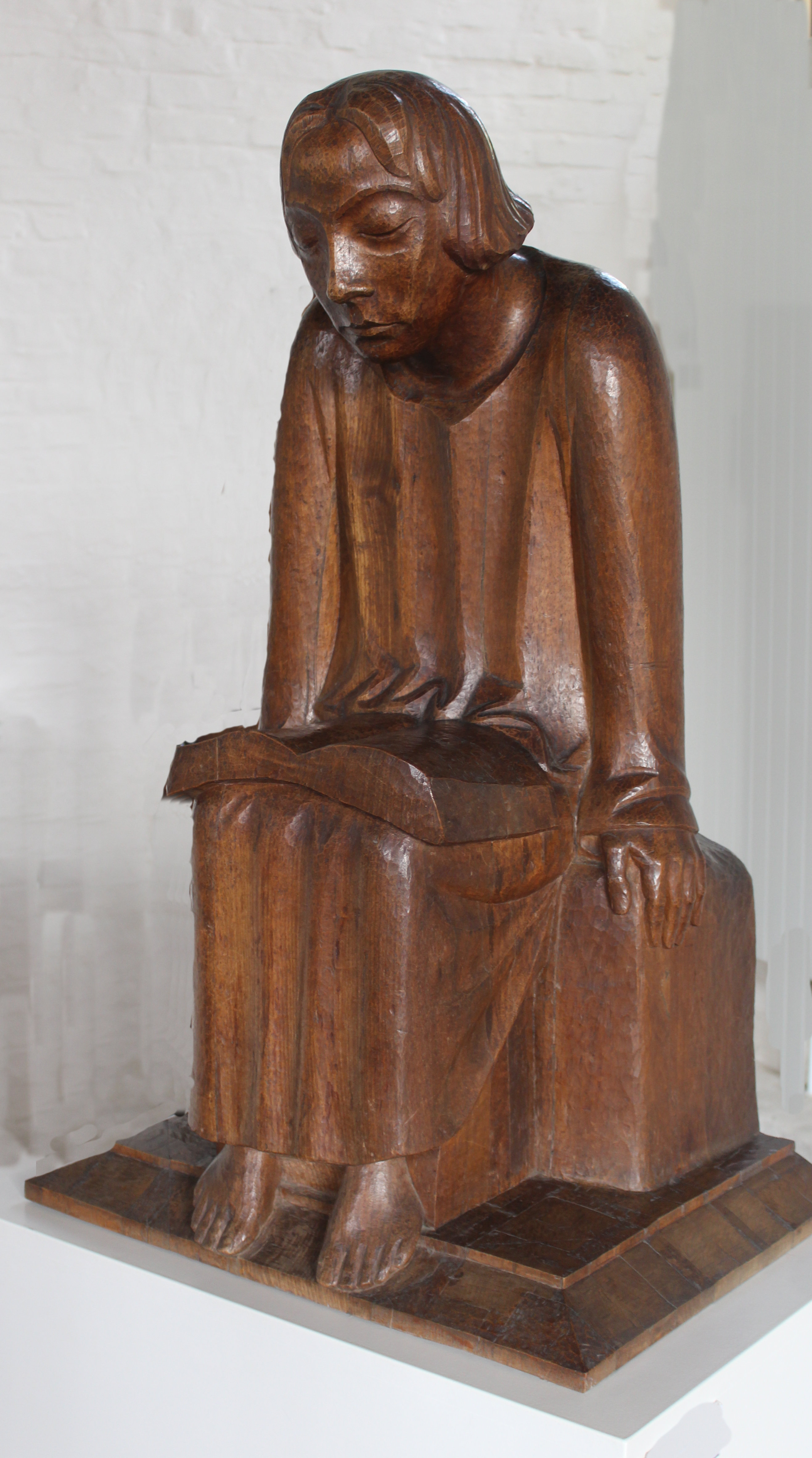
Studying Monk by Ernst Barlach, Gertrudenkapelle in Güstrow

In 1938, a group of people attempt to leave a coastal village in Germany and cross the Baltic Sea to Sweden. There is a boy whose father has died at sea and who works on the boat of fisherman Knudsen, a Jewess named Judith whose mother committed suicide to help her flee, and a communist named Gregor who is doubting his commitment to the party. There is also the expressionist sculpture Studying Monk by Ernst Barlach, which pastor Helander wishes to save from the Nazis. Knudsen is approached but does not want to be involved in the enterprise. Eventually, Gregor forces Knudsen to take the sculpture and Judith to Sweden with his boat, but at the expense of Gregor himself, who decides to stay behind.

== Reception ==
Kirkus Reviews called the novel rather deliberately elusive, and wrote that despite some writing of marked distinction and an excellent English translation, it will only appeal to niche readers.

== Adaptations ==
Flight to Afar has been adapted for cinema twice. First as Sansibar (1961), directed by Rainer Wolffhardt, and then as Sansibar oder der letzte Grund (film) (1987), directed by Bernhard Wicki.

It is the basis for the opera Sansibar with libretto by Wolfgang Willaschek and music by Eckehard Mayer. The opera premiered in 1994.
