= The Lost Honor of Kathryn Beck =

1984 American television film

- Also known as: Act of Passion
- Genre: Drama
- Based on: The Lost Honour of Katharina Blum by Heinrich Böll
- Teleplay by: Karl Miller
- Directed by: Simon Langton
- Starring: Marlo Thomas; Kris Kristofferson; George Dzundza; David Rasche; Jon DeVries
- Music by: Laurence Rosenthal
- Country of origin: United States
- Original language: English

Production
- Executive producer: Marlo Thomas
- Producer: John Nicolella
- Cinematography: Gordon Willis
- Editor: Phillip Schopper
- Running time: 96 minutes
- Production companies: CBS Entertainment Production; Cornworld; Open Road

Original release
- Network: CBS
- Release: January 24, 1984

The Lost Honor of Kathryn Beck is a 1984 American drama television film directed by Simon Langton. The film, starring Marlo Thomas and Kris Kristofferson, is based on the 1974 novel The Lost Honour of Katharina Blum by Heinrich Böll, and has been released on VHS under the title Act of Passion.

== Plot ==
Kathryn Beck is the owner of a small catering business in small-town America who spends the night with a man named Ben Cole, who unknown to her is a suspected bank robber and Weatherman terrorist. After he leaves, the police burst into her house, hold her as a witness and ridicule her. When the media report about her rendezvous, and call her a terrorist lover, Kathryn must try her best to save her image.

== Cast ==
- Marlo Thomas as Kathryn Beck
- Kris Kristofferson as Ben Cole
- George Dzundza as Lt. DeCarlo
- Jon DeVries as Bob Fuhrman
- David Rasche as Donald Catton
- Linda Thorson as Cory Fuhrman
- Edward Winter as Carl Macaluso
- Randy Rocca as Detective Gary Astarte
- Christine Estabrook as Janet Reiss
- Steven Williams as Les Averback
- Ron Parady as James McLandish

== Production ==
Marlo Thomas, who served as an executive producer, pitched the story to CBS and personally recruited Kris Kristofferson for the male lead. In an interview, she said that the role of Ben Cole was written with him in mind; she gave him the script at 7 pm; according to her, he called her at midnight to accept the role.
