= Murke's Collected Silences =

- Short story by Heinrich Böll (1917–1985)
- Original title: Doktor Murkes gesammeltes Schweigen
- Genre(s): Satire

Publication
- Published in: Frankfurter Hefte (1955); Doktor Murkes gesammeltes Schweigen und andere Satiren (1958)
- Published in English: 1963

"Murke's Collected Silences" (German: Doktor Murkes gesammeltes Schweigen) is a short story by German writer Heinrich Böll, first published in the Frankfurter Hefte in 1955 and in Doktor Murkes gesammeltes Schweigen und andere Satiren in 1958. A satirical response to the German Wirtschaftswunder, the story examines the relationship between the generations in post-war Germany and the country's post-war surge in religious belief.

== Synopsis ==
The Murke of the title is a psychology graduate whose first job is as editor for the Cultural Department at Broadcasting House. Everything about the place irritates him: "The rugs were impressive, the corridors were impressive, the furniture was impressive, and the pictures were in excellent taste." He takes out a little card his mother has sent him, with a picture of the Sacred Heart and I prayed for you at St. James's Church (Ich betete für Dich in Sankt Jacobi), and sticks it in one of the corridors behind an assistant producer's door frame.

Murke begins his days with a "panic-breakfast" ("Angstfrühstück") by riding the paternoster lift to the empty space at the top for a brief dose of terror that it might get stuck. He has started collecting discarded tape—tape containing silence, where the speaker has paused—which he splices together and takes home to listen to in the evening. Soon he advances to recording his girlfriend sitting silently in front of a microphone.

The story centres on Murke's editing of two radio lectures on The Nature of Art by the prominent cultural critic Professor Bur-Malottke, author of "numerous books of a belletristic-philosophical-religious and art-historical nature". Looking at Bur-Malottke, Murke "suddenly knew the meaning of hatred":

[H]e hated this great fat, handsome creature whose books—two million three hundred and fifty thousand copies of them—lay around in libraries, bookstores, bookshelves, and bookcases, and not for one second did he dream of suppressing this hatred.

Bur-Malottke had converted to Catholicism in 1945, the high point of post-war German guilt, but overnight, or so he said, has had second thoughts about his Nature of Art tapes, fearing he "might be blamed for contributing to the religious overtones in radio". The tapes contain the word "God" 27 times, and Bur-Malottke wants them changed to "that higher Being Whom we revere" (jenes höhere Wesen, das wir verehren"), a phrase more consistent with his pre-conversion beliefs. Rather than have him re-record the talk, he asks that the technicians record the new words, then splice them in instead of "God".

The editing is complicated by the need to record different cases—ten nominatives, five accusatives (that is, fifteen "jenes höhere Wesen, das wir verehren"), five datives ("jenem höheren Wesen, das wir verehren"), seven genitives ("jenes höheren Wesens, das wir verehren"), and one vocative ("O du höheres Wesen, das wir verehren!")—much to Bur-Malottke's irritation and Murke's amusement. Half a minute will have to be cut from each Nature of Art lecture to accommodate the extra words. "It was clear that Bur-Malottke had not thought of these complications; he began to sweat, the grammatical transposition bothered him."

Bur-Malottke pursed his lips toward the muzzle of the mike as if he wanted to kiss it, sweat ran down his face, and through the glass Murke observed with cold detachment the agony that Bur-Malottke was enduring; then he suddenly switched Bur-Malottke off, stopping the moving tape that was recording Bur-Malottke's words and feasted his eyes on the spectacle of Bur-Malottke behind the glass, soundless, like a fat, handsome fish. He switched on his microphone and his voice came quietly into the studio, "I'm sorry, but our tape is defective, and I must ask you to begin again at the beginning, with the nominatives."

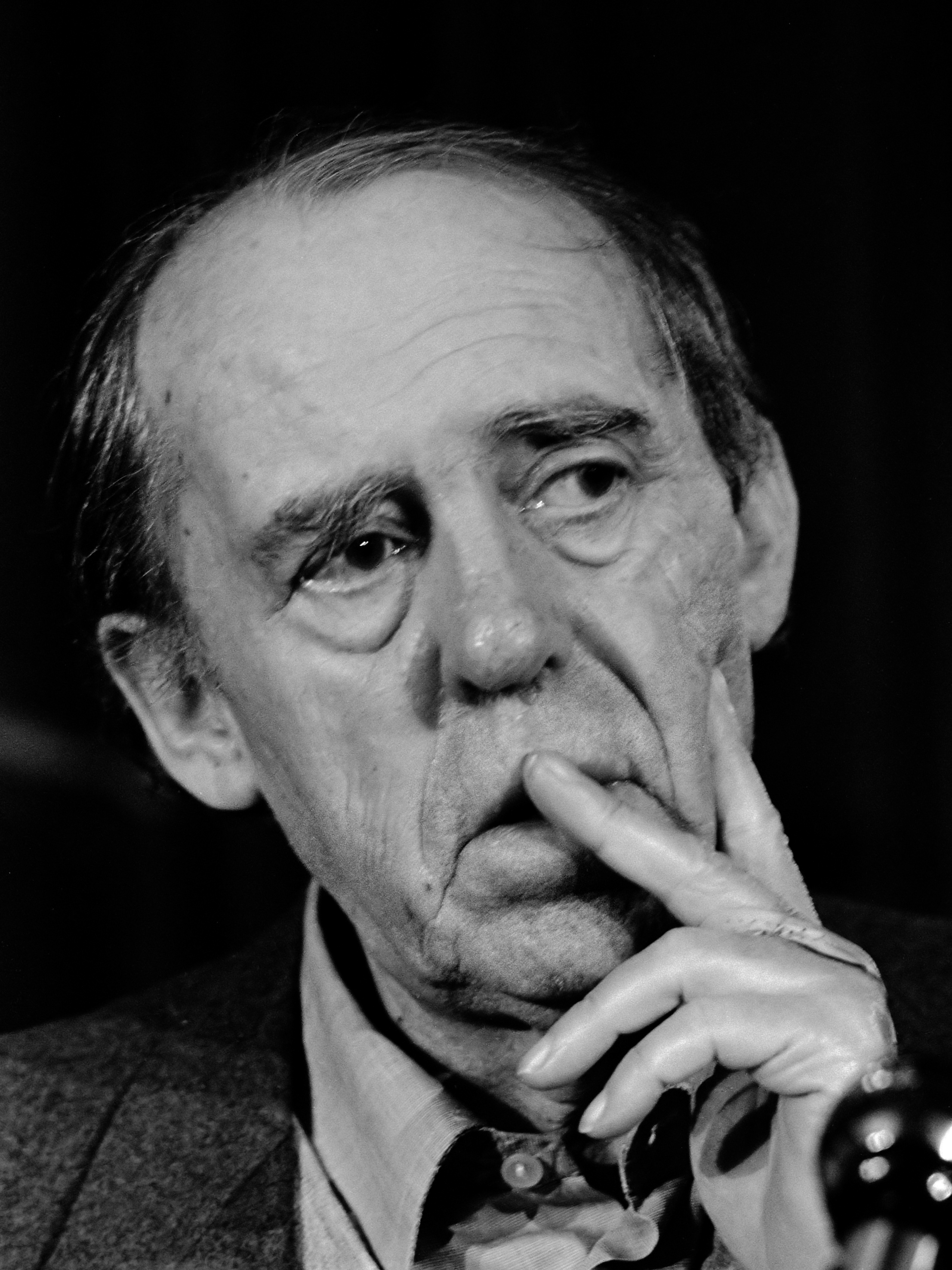
Heinrich Böll, 1983

Bur-Malottke approaches the director afterwards to ask that the station review all the tapes he has recorded since 1945: "I cannot bear the thought that after my death, tapes may be run off on which I say things I no longer believe. Particularly in some of my political utterances, during the fervor of 1945 ..." Murke's boss congratulates Murke for having been able to sit through Bur-Malottke's lectures. The boss once had to listen three times to a four-hour Hitler speech. When he began, he was still a Nazi and by the time he'd finished he wasn't: "a drastic cure ... but very effective".

A technician gives 12 of Bur-Malottke's "Gods" to an assistant producer who is editing a play about an atheist whose questions are answered by silence: "Atheist (louder still): 'And who will remember me when I have turned into leaves?' (Silence)." The producer wishes he had a voice saying "God" at those points, and is amazed when the technician hands him Murke's tin of "Gods" ("you really are a godsend"). The technician decides to keep the producer's spare silences for Murke's collection. There had been no silences at all in Bur-Malottke's Nature of Art lectures.

The story ends with the producer taking a crumpled piece of paper from his back pocket ("Funny, isn't it, the kitschy stuff you can find in this place?"), the card Murke had stuck in his door frame earlier that day: I prayed for you at St. James's Church.

== Themes ==
The story is a satirical response to Germany's postwar Wirtschaftswunder. Mikko Keskinen, a professor of comparative literature, writes that Bur-Malottke's project of erasure stands for Germany's efforts to integrate citizens with a suspect past; Murke's collected silences stand in contrast to the "hollow words and inauthentic deeds" that surround him. That Germans were "dumbstruck" after the Holocaust was often the only possible response to it: "[O]ne could retreat from the word, and thus, at least momentarily, renounce the very tokens of humanity." But the word can be used to defeat the hypocrisy: Murke's imposition of the rules of declension was able to "bring about a deterioration in the powers that be and a deviation in their articulatory authority". Keskinen links the story back to the final sentence of Ludwig Wittgenstein's Tractatus (1921): "Wovon man nicht sprechen kann, darüber muß man schweigen" ("Whereof one cannot speak, thereof one must be silent.")

== See also ==
- 4′33″

== Works cited ==
- Black, Martin David (2006). Heinrich Böll: Stories, Political Writings, and Autobiographical Works. New York: Continuum International Publishing Group. ISBN 978-0826417985.
- Böll, Heinrich (2013). Doktor Murkes gesammeltes Schweigen und andere Satiren. Kiepenheuer & Witsch. ISBN 978-3423013741.
- Böll, Heinrich (1995). "Murke's Collected Silences". The Stories of Heinrich Böll. Evanston: Northwestern University Press. ISBN 978-0810112070.
- Keskinen, Mikko (2008). Audio Book: Essays on Sound Technologies in Narrative Fiction. Lanham: Lexington Books. ISBN 978-0739118313.
- Ziolkowski, Theodore (Summer 1960). "Heinrich Böll: Conscience and Craft". Books Abroad. 34 (3): 213–222. doi:10.2307/40114768. JSTOR 40114768.
- Wittgenstein, Ludwig (1963). Tractatus Logico-Philosophicus. Frankfurt-am-Main: Suhrkamp Verlag. ISBN 978-3518100127.
