= The Cherries of Freedom =

1952 book by Alfred Andersch

- Author: Alfred Andersch
- Original title: Die Kirschen der Freiheit
- Language: German
- Publisher: Frankfurter Verlagsanstalt
- Publication date: 1952
- Publication place: West Germany
- English publication date: 1978
- Pages: 130

The Cherries of Freedom: A Report (German: Die Kirschen der Freiheit. Ein Bericht) is a 1952 book by the German writer Alfred Andersch. It is a mix of report, essay and memoir, covering Andersch's family and his own youthful communist engagement, life in the Third Reich, and the subjects of freedom, bravery and cowardice, culminating with Andersch's account of his desertion from the Wehrmacht in 1944.

The book became a bestseller and widely discussed in West Germany when it was published. It received new attention after W. G. Sebald published a literary attack on Andersch in 1993, giving emphasis to how Andersch avoided to give an account of his divorce from his Jewish wife in 1943. The Cherries of Freedom appeared in English in 1978 in the volume My Disappearance in Providence and Other Stories and as a separate volume in 2004. Kirkus Reviews described it in 2004 as a "small gem: still brilliantly alive and relevant".
