= Bend Sinister (novel) =

1947 novel by Vladimir Nabokov

- Cover of the first edition
- Author: Vladimir Nabokov
- Language: English
- Genre: Dystopian fiction
- Publisher: Henry Holt and Company
- Publication date: 1947
- Publication place: United States

Bend Sinister is a dystopian novel written by Vladimir Nabokov during the years 1945 and 1946, and published by Henry Holt and Company in 1947. It was Nabokov's eleventh novel and his second written in English.

== Title ==
In heraldry, a standard "bend" is a diagonal band from the upper dexter to the lower sinister (that is, from the upper right of the coat of arms' bearer to his lower left) and a "bend sinister" is its left-handed reverse. To a viewer facing the shield the appearances will be reversed, \ and / respectively. In a 1963 edition of the book, Nabokov explains that "this choice of a title was an attempt to suggest an outline broken by refraction, a distortion in the mirror of being, a wrong turn taken by life." In the novel, Nabokov often uses word-play concerning leftward (or "sinister") movements.

== Plot summary ==
The book takes place in a fictitious Eastern European city of Padukgrad, where a government arises following the rise of a philosophy known as "Ekwilism", which discourages the idea of anyone being different from anyone else, and promotes the state as the prominent good in society. The story begins with the protagonist, a university professor and renowned philosopher in his country Adam Krug, who had just lost his wife to an unsuccessful surgery. He is quickly asked to sign and deliver a speech to the leader of the new government by the head of the university and his colleagues, but Krug refuses. The government is led by a man named Paduk and his "Party of the Average Man".

After Adam Krug leaves the university, it is revealed through he memories that he was a classmate of Paduk in school, whom he frequently bullied and referred to disparagingly as "the Toad". Meanwhile, Paduk arrests many of the people close to Krug and those against his Ekwilist philosophy, and attempts to get the influential Krug to promote the state philosophy to help stomp out dissent and increase his personal prestige as a newly established leader.

Paduk calls Krug to his office and tries to entice Adam with various offers, but Krug persistently refuses, even after his friends and acquaintances (Maximov, Ember, and Hedron) are arrested by Paduk’s authorities and incarcerated. Finally, Paduk orders the kidnapping of Krug's young son, David, for a ransom. After Krug capitulates and is prepared to promote the Ekwilist philosophy, Paduk promises David's safe return. However, when David is to be returned to him, Krug is horrified to find that the child he is presented is not his son.; due to a bureaucratic error, David has been sent to a rehabilitation clinic for violent prisoners (disguised as an orphanage) where he was killed when offered as a "release" to the prisoners.

Paduk makes an offer to allow Krug to personally kill those responsible, but he swears at the officials and is locked in a large prison cell. Another offer is made to Krug to free 24 opponents of Ekwilism, including his friends who have been arrested, in exchange for doing so. Krug once again refuses and charges to attack Paduk before being shot by Paduk’s henchmen. At this point, Nabokov feels such pity for Krug that he actually intervenes into the narration and emphasizes that Bend Sinister was, thankfully, a fictional story and that Adam Krug never existed.

== Characters ==
Adam Krug
The novel’s protagonist, a university professor, a renowned author, and an influential philosopher in Padukgrad. Paduk attempts to get him to endorse and cooperate with the new government.

Olga Krug
Adam's late wife, who dies after an unsuccessful surgery in the very beginning of the novel.

David Krug
Adam's and Olga’s son, who is indirectly killed by Paduk’s authorities after a bureaucratic mix-up.

Paduk
Dictator of Padukgrad; founder of Ekwilism and the Party of the Average Man. He is also a former classmate of Adam Krug, who nicknamed him "the Toad".

Ember
A Padukgrad intellectual who studies the works of Shakespeare. Since he is Adam Krug’s best friend, Paduk’s authorities arrest him in order to put pressure on Krug.

Mariette
A housemaid at the Krug household. Padul sent her to spy on Adam and David Krug. She flirts with the elder Krug, and manages to seduce him.

== Background ==
=== Publication history ===
Nabokov, who was teaching at Wellesley College at the time, first began writing Bend Sinister in 1942 while the greater part was composed in the winter and spring of 1945–1946, soon after the completion of World War II. The novel's title was quite volatile, as Nabokov originally titled it The Person from Porlock before soon electing for Game to Gunm. It would undergo further changes, to Solus Rex, before finally settling on the current name. The manuscript was sent to Allen Tate, at the time an editor at Henry Holt, in the Fall of 1946 and published on June 12, 1947.

=== Influences ===
During the war against the Axis powers and after their downfall, a new wave of pro-USSR sentiment swept America, as the Soviet Armed Forces had played a large role in the Allied victory, which deeply disturbed Nabokov, a fierce opponent of Communism. Brian Boyd writes that Nabokov wrote the novel in "an attempt to show that Nazi Germany and Soviet Russia represented fundamentally the same brutish vulgarity inimical to everything most vulnerable and most valuable in human life". In February 1943, Nabokov would give an impassioned speech at a panel discussion at Wellesley, extolling the virtues of democracy while denouncing totalitarian states in the process:

Democracy is humanity at its best, not because we happen to think that a republic is better than a king and a king is better than nothing and nothing is better than a dictator, but because it is the natural condition of every man ever since the human mind became conscious not only of the world but of itself. Morally, democracy is invincible. Physically, that side will win which has the better guns. Of faith and pride, both sides have plenty. That our faith and our pride are of a totally different order cannot concern an enemy who believes in shedding blood and is proud of its own.

Such influences aside, Nabokov was insistent on his aestheticism, disclaiming any interest in the "literature of social comment" and denying "automatic comparisons between Bend Sinister and Kafka's creations and Orwell's clichés".

== Reception ==
Of the reviews it did garner, reactions were generally mixed, perhaps best exemplified by The New Republic's comments which called it "at once impressive, powerful and oddly exasperating."

The novel did receive a glowing review from The New York Times: "It will be too bad if this book fails to find an audience because the armed battle with tyrant states has ended. The war goes on, and the problem, the struggle of free thought against the totalitarian state, is still with us. No one [who] reads Bend Sinister can blink it away." Furthermore, the editor to whom Nabokov sent the original manuscript, Allen Tate, deeply admired the work, calling it "the only first rate piece of literature that I have had the privilege of reading as an editor". Tate admired the work so much that he wrote the blurb for the novel, concluding in it that the "mastery of English prose exhibited [in Bend Sinister] has not been surpassed by any writer of our generation who was born to English".

Brian Boyd, writing in his book Vladimir Nabokov: The American Years, praises the "jarring self-consciousness" and "inventiveness and challenge of particular passages" in the novel; but he concludes that Bend Sinister "does not reward us enough as we read to justify all its difficulties and disruptions".

However, it has received retrospective praise from a number of contemporary critics. The Forward wrote "Bend Sinister, for all its shortcomings, evinces an unnerving prescience that reminds us of our proximity to a darker past, but also our ability to overcome it. It is one of Nabokov's finest statements on the fight to reclaim freedom and individualism against the pressures of mass culture and victimization."

== Film ==
A black and white German television adaptation was made in West Germany in 1970. It was directed by Herbert Vesely and starred Helmut Käutner as Adam Krug and Heinrich Schweiger as Paduk.

== Sources ==
- Boyd, Brian (1991), Vladimir Nabokov: The American Years, Princeton, NJ: Princeton University Press, ISBN 0-691-06797-X
- Nabokov, Vladimir (1990), Bend Sinister, New York, NY: Vintage International, ISBN 9780679727279
