= The Train Was on Time =

1949 novella by Heinrich Böll

- First edition (Buch und Welt)
- Author: Heinrich Böll
- Original title: Der Zug war pünktlich
- Translator: Leila Vennewitz
- Publisher: Friedrich Middelhauve Verlag
- Publication date: 1949

The Train Was on Time (German: Der Zug war pünktlich) is a novella by German author Heinrich Böll. It was published by Friedrich Middelhauve Verlag in Cologne in 1949. The book is about a German soldier, Andreas, taking a train to Przemyśl in Poland. It was translated into English by Leila Vennewitz.

The story addresses the experience of German soldiers during the Second World War on the Eastern Front, where fighting was particularly vicious and unforgiving. Böll had explored the same issue in A Soldier's Legacy, which was written in 1948 but published later. The Train Was on Time was his first published novel. Theodore Ziolkowski called it "an artistic tour de force.

== Synopsis ==
"Why don't you get on?" a chaplain asked him when the train arrived. "Get on?" asked the soldier, amazed. "Why, I might want to hurl myself under the wheels, I might want to desert ... eh? What's the hurry? I might go crazy, I've a perfect right to, I've a perfect right to go crazy. I don't want to die, that's what's so horrible—that I don't want to die."

On his way to the war front, he meets two other Germans with whom he starts a dialogue and a short-term friendship. He also meets Olina, a Polish prostitute, who has been working for Polish underground guerrillas but who has become disillusioned with such activity, seeing it as begetting only further suffering. During their trip we learn much about horrors soldiers endure in the war, and the effect it leaves on a person. Andreas has a particularly passive (some might say stoic) attitude to his involvement in the conflict, and the inevitability of death (and the question of fate) hangs over the narrative in a tragic fashion. It is arguable that the only real choices in the novel, presented in its opening gambits, involve the place and manner of Andreas's death in the war, rather than the possibility of its evasion. This tragic fate seems to be circumvented to some extent when Andreas meets Olina and she plans an escape to the Carpathian Mountains, but the eventual fate cannot (it appears) be overlooked. In this sense, connections can be made between the work and the structure of ancient Greek tragedies such as the story of Oedipus; as with Oedipus, actions taken in an effort to avert the foreordained fate only bring it about.

In this short novel Böll attempted to follow the development of battle-induced posttraumatic stress disorder.

There is also a religious dimension to the novel, given Andreas's friendship with a priest called Paul. Just before the fateful ending, Andreas muses "O God, my time has passed and what have I done with it? I have never done anything worth doing. I must pray, pray for all."

The book was translated into English by Leila Vennewitz.

== See also ==
- 1949 in literature
- German literature
