= The Bread of Those Early Years (film) =

1962 film

- Film poster
- Directed by: Herbert Vesely
- Screenplay by: Heinrich Böll; Leo Ti; Herbert Vesely
- Based on: The Bread of Those Early Years by Heinrich Böll
- Produced by: Hansjürgen Pohland
- Starring: Christian Doermer
- Cinematography: Wolf Wirth
- Edited by: Christa Pohland
- Release date: 22 May 1962
- Running time: 84 minutes
- Country: West Germany
- Language: German

The Bread of Those Early Years (German: Das Brot der frühen Jahre) is a 1962 West German film directed by Herbert Vesely, based on the novel The Bread of Those Early Years by Heinrich Böll. It was entered into the 1962 Cannes Film Festival. At the Berlin International Filmfestival 1962, the film was awarded five film awards in gold in the categories of ‘Best Actress’ (Vera Tschechowa), ‘Best Cinematography’ (Wolf Wirth), ‘Best Director’ (Herbert Vesely), ‘Best Music’ (Attila Zoller) and ‘Best Feature-Length Film’ (producer Hansjürgen Pohland).

== Cast ==
- Christian Doermer as Walter Fendrich
- Karen Blanguernon as Gertrud
- Vera Tschechowa as Ulla Wickweber
- Eike Siegel as Frau Brotig
- Gerry Bretscher as Wolf Wickweber
- Tilo von Berlepsch as Vater Fendrich
