= Breakers (novel) =

1985 novel by Martin Walser

- Author: Martin Walser
- Original title: Brandung
- Translator: Leila Vennewitz
- Language: German
- Publisher: Suhrkamp Verlag
- Publication date: 1985
- Publication place: West Germany
- English publication date: 1987
- Pages: 319
- ISBN: 3-518-03570-3

Breakers (German: Brandung) is a 1985 novel by the German writer Martin Walser. It was published in English translation by Leila Vennewitz in 1987.

== Plot ==
Helmut Halm is a German professor who teaches for a year at the Washington University in Oakland, a fictionalised version of the University of California. He socialises with colleagues in the German department and is approached romantically by a female student.

== Reception ==
Richard Eder of the Los Angeles Times wrote that Walser gives a German spin to a genre that has been a British specialty, portraying a foreigner at an American college, and called the story a comedy of manners with "more wit than comedy". Eder wrote that Walser's "Germany is soulless, materialistic, technocratic and loud-mouthed", and the main character in Breakers "is a man who tries to be these things but fails".

The book received the 1989 German Literary Prize from the American Translators Association.
