= Group Portrait with a Lady =

- Directed by: Aleksandar Petrović
- Written by: Ginette Billard; Heinrich Böll; Jürgen Kolbe; Aleksandar Petrović
- Produced by: Martin Hellstern; Hans Pflüger
- Starring: Romy Schneider
- Cinematography: Pierre-William Glenn
- Edited by: Marika Radvanyi; Agape von Dorstewitz
- Release date: 25 May 1977
- Running time: 107 minutes
- Countries: West Germany; France
- Languages: German; French

Group Portrait with a Lady (German: Gruppenbild mit Dame) is a 1977 German-French drama film directed by Aleksandar Petrović. It was entered into the 1977 Cannes Film Festival. It is based on the novel of the same name by German Nobel-Prize winning novelist Heinrich Böll.

== Cast ==
- Romy Schneider as Leni Gruyten
- Brad Dourif as Boris Koltowski
- Michel Galabru as Walter Pelzer
- Vadim Glowna as Erhard Schweigert
- Richard Münch as Hubert Gruyten
- Vitus Zeplichal as Heinrich Gruyten
- Milena Dravić as Sister Klementine
- Rüdiger Vogler as Boldig
- Fritz Lichtenhahn as Dr. Scholsdorff
- Rudolf Schündler as Otto Hoyser
- Bata Živojinović as Bogakov
- Gefion Helmke as Mrs Schweigert
- Wolfgang Condrus as Kremp
- Peter Kern as Werner Hoyser
- Dieter Schidor as Kurt Hoyser
- Heinz Lieven as SS Officer
