= Irish Journal =

1957 travelogue by Heinrich Böll

Irish Journal (German: Irisches Tagebuch) is a travelogue by Heinrich Böll. It was first published in German in 1957 and appeared ten years later in English translation. It has shaped the German perception of Ireland for decades and continues to be influential.

== Structure and making of the book ==
=== Origin in a series of newspaper articles ===
Irish Journal consists of 18 short chapters, that are at most loosely connected and describe the author's experiences on Achill Island and in other parts of Ireland. Most chapters of the book are based on individual articles ("Irish Impressions") that had been published from 1954 onwards in a German newspaper, Frankfurter Allgemeine Zeitung. From an early date onwards, there were intentions to eventually transform these articles into a book. For the book a considerable number of articles were shortened and rewritten into a first-person narrative. Moreover, some chapters were newly created, of which the first one (Arrival I) is the most noteworthy.

=== Importance of the newly created first chapter ===
The first chapter (Arrival I) sets the tone for the entire book. It prepares the reader for immersion into a different world, and touches on important recurring themes like religion, poverty and emigration, and cultures of drinking and caring. However, it also illustrates that not everything is always as genuine as it seems to be on first sight. For example, an emigrant woman who openly confesses that she no longer believes in God also makes clear that she would never dare not to go to church when she visits her family back in Ireland. This situation is referred to in later chapters as a warning that there might be more to some situations than meets the eye. Such reflections are not included in the original newspaper articles, and might reflect the author's more sophisticated encounter of the country over the years.

=== Components ===
Irish Journal consists of the following 18 chapters:

1. The Arrival I (new chapter written for the book)
2. The Arrival II
3. Pray for the Soul of Michael O’Neill
4. Mayo – God Help US
5. Skeleton of a Human Habitation
6. Itinerant Political Dentist
7. Portrait of an Irish Town (Limerick in the Morning / Limerick in the Evening)
8. When God Made Time
9. Thoughts on Irish Rain
10. The Most Beautiful Feet in the World (new chapter written for the book)
11. The Dead Redskin of Duke Street
12. Gazing into the Fire
13. When Seamus Wants a Drink
14. Mrs. D.’s Ninth Child
15. A Small Contribution to Occidental Mythology
16. Not a Swan to Be Seen (mostly new chapter written for the book)
17. In a Manner of Speaking
18. Farewell

Moreover, the book has an disclaimer, through which the author denies the absoluteness of his point of view:

 "This Ireland exists: but whoever goes there and fails to find it has no claim on the author."
 "Es gibt dieses Irland: Wer aber hinfährt und es nicht findet, hat keine Ersatzansprüche an den Autor."

The English translation of 1967 (translated by Leila Vennewitz) is amended by a foreword and an epilogue. In the short foreword Böll explains the need of an epilogue, where he can address intermediate social and economic changes:

 "The Ireland described in this book is that of the mid-1950s.
  My comments on the great changes that have taken place in that country since are contained in the epilogue."

=== Atypical travelogue structure and controversial title ===
Unlike the original series of articles or indeed typical travelogues, Irish Journal lacks any chronological and geographical order, as Böll restructured the order of the original articles heavily for the book. This results, for example, in a chapter of the single author travelling through Dublin, that is followed by a chapter where the same man is accompanied by his family on the way to the Achill Islands. Because of this lack of obvious structure, the chosen title is perceived as counterintuitive and is heavily discussed. Furthermore, it is suggested that the use of the word "diary" instead of "journal" might be closer to Böll's intended interpretation of the German "Tagebuch" as personal account. Although other titles have been discussed during the formation phase of the book, the motif of a journal/diary reoccurs in the articles throughout the years.

=== Arguable similarities to the structure of Joyce's Ulysses ===
Böll had a deep knowledge of and admiration for Irish literature. John Millington Synge, Jonathan Swift and Seán O'Casey are repeatedly referred to in Irish Journal. Moreover, it is argued that the structure of his Irish Journal was inspired by James Joyce's Ulysses. From the beginning, Böll was determined to have likewise 18 chapters. Like Ulysses his book has two beginnings and at least figuratively stretches over one day, as the last chapters reverse movement of an orange milk jug from the second chapter suggests. Additionally, both books have a change of perspective in chapter four and the style of Böll's last chapter almost resembles the monologue of Ulysses's last chapter.

== Reception ==
When it was published in 1957 in Germany, Irish Journal was immediately very successful and well received. Böll's contemporary German author Carl Zuckmayer found Irish Journal to be one of the "most beautiful and worthy books written in the last fifty years".

Until today, Böll's book is considered a "cult book" that has personally influenced almost every scholar on Irish-German connections as well as more than a generation of tourists. In Germany alone, it has sold more than two million copies. Furthermore, the book has been translated into at least 17 languages. Scholars continue to engage with the book and its 50th anniversary has particularly demonstrated its continuing relevance, when Irish Journal frequently became a point of reference to trace Ireland's changes of half a century. The most popular homage is Hugo Hamilton's Die redselige Insel – Irisches Tagebuch (The Island of Talking – Irish Journal) of 2007. This book updates Böll's impressions and not only the title is intended to remind of the original Irish Journal; the iconic disclaimer is also demonstratively resembled:

Dieses Irland gibt es. Und sollte man dorthin reisen und es nicht finden, dann hat man nicht gut genug hingeschaut.
(translation: This Ireland exists. And should one travel there and not find it, then they have not looked closely enough.)

The reception in Ireland was initially limited because of German as sole language of publication. It was also rather negative, especially once it was translated into English.
