= The Silent Angel (novel) =

1992 novel by Heinrich Böll

- Author: Heinrich Böll
- Original title: Der Engel schwieg
- Translator: Breon Mitchell
- Language: German
- Publisher: Kiepenheuer & Witsch
- Publication date: 1992
- Publication place: Germany
- English publication date: 27 June 1994
- Pages: 211
- ISBN: 3-462-02214-8

The Silent Angel (German: Der Engel schwieg) is a novel by the German writer Heinrich Böll, written in 1950 and published in 1992. It is set at the end of World War II and follows a German soldier who goes to Cologne to deliver the will of a dead soldier to his widow.

The Silent Angel was the first novel Böll wrote but not published until seven years after his death. It is an example of Trümmerliteratur.
