= Eckehard Mayer =

German composer (born 1946)

Eckehard Mayer (born 1946) is a German composer.

== Career ==
Born in Hainsberg, Mayer was a member of the Dresdner Kreuzchor from 1957 to 1965. He then studied music in Leipzig. From 1970 to 1982 he worked at various theatres as repétiteur and conductor (among others at the Volkstheater Rostock, and the Semperoper). From 1982 to 2011 he worked at the Staatsschauspiel Dresden as a composer, conductor and pianist, with interruptions as director of acting music. He was awarded the Carl Maria von Weber Prize for composition in 1976 and 1984. His opera Sansibar was premiered at the Schwetzingen Festival in 1994.

== Stage works ==
- Ballade für Nico und Maria, 1978, chamber opera after M. Richter
- Die Weise von Liebe und Tod, (see The Love and Death of Cornet Christopher Rilke) 1984, ballet after Rainer Maria Rilke
- Der goldene Topf, 1989, opera after E.T.A. Hoffmann, Semperoper Dresden
- Sansibar, 1994, opera after Alfred Andersch, Schwetzingen Festival / Bavarian State Opera
- Das Treffen in Teltge, 2000, opera after Günter Grass, premiered on 6 March 2005 Theater Dortmund
- Passage, 2005, opera after C. Hein, premiered on 4 Mai 2006 Landesbühnen Sachsen, Synagoge Dresden

== Writing ==
Three volumes of poetry, two diaries, and two novels by Mayer (2013 Ab jetzt ist es spät; 2016 Die Nähe Roman, 2 Erzählungen (2017 Der Spaziergang / Nach Rosmersholm have been published by Verlag Janos Stekovics.
