= A Mouthful of Earth =

1962 dystopian play by Heinrich Böll

A Mouthful of Earth (German: Ein Schluck Erde) is the only play written by the West German author and Nobel prizewinner Heinrich Böll. Set several hundred years in the future, it concerns a dystopian society living on pontoons above a flooded earth and surviving by scavenging the oceans and processing vestiges of soil. A tyrannical caste system holds sway over society, prohibiting all pleasures and cultural activities. Divers explore the waters and discover relics of the 20th century, leading to surmise and commentary about how life was lived at that time.

Despite the bleak scenario, the play has charismatic characters and lively conversation, and is infused with humour. Böll had a particular interest in environmental conservation, as evidenced by the Heinrich Böll Foundation set up in fulfilment of his bequest, and this interest is strongly demonstrated in Ein Schluck Erde, the theme of which is highly resonant with the environmental issues emerging in the first quarter of the 21st century.

== German text ==
- Ein Schluck Erde, Kiepenheuer & Witsch, 1962

== English translation ==
- A Mouthful of Earth, translated by Rachel A H Beckett, unpublished, 2019. It can be viewed under her profile on Academia.edu.
