= The Safety Net =

1979 novel by Heinrich Böll

First edition (publ. Kiepenheuer & Witsch)

The Safety Net (German: Fürsorgliche Belagerung) is a 1979 novel by Heinrich Böll. An English translation by Leila Vennewitz was published in 1981.

== Content ==
The story centres on Fritz Tolm, an aging art historian turned newspaper publisher, who is elected as the head of the "Association", which is a secretive "power centre" in West Germany composed of bankers, industrialists and high-ranking members of the media. He replaces the steel magnate Pliefger. In particular it explores the way that he is subjected to a huge amount of security as a result of his position (he is held in a house overridden by police surveillance and lives in fear of terrorist violence from the left-wing underground) and the effect that this has on him and his family - his wife, Kathe, his daughter Sabine, and his sons Herbert and Rolf.

The novel is constructed on the basis of a polyphony of voices and perspectives; chapters are narrated from the point of view of Tolm, his daughter Sabine, Helga Hendler (the wife of Sabine's lover), Hubert Hendler (Sabine's lover), Rolf Tolm, Holzpuke (the head of Tolm's security operations), Erna Breuer (Sabine's neighbour), Bleibl (an industrialist with a past, unlike Tolm, with links to the Nazis), Kathe, the terrorist Veronica, Rolf's wife, Fritz's daughter-in-law, and Rolf's lover Katharina. The wide variety of perspectives has a decentring effect on the novel, meaning that it is difficult to read a single line of argument or world-view from it.

As with numerous other works by Böll, the novel's setting is in Cologne and the villages and farms that surround it.

== Themes ==
Böll's work focuses upon the question of how well post-war German society operated, specifically through its embrace of capitalism and the globalised free market. In particular he attempts to explore and understand the impulse towards violence and insurrection that drove groups such as the Baader-Meinhof Gang. At that point many conservatives, particularly associated with the Springer publishing concern, were urging a crackdown on public order that would involve a stringent limitation of civil liberties.

Tolm is represented as a markedly unambitious figure, despite his ascension to the position in the "Association", and is motivated by fear of other companies taking over his industry (such as Zummerling). His capitalism is, therefore, characterised by a certain world-weariness, raising questions about the post-war German "economic miracle".

It also discusses the balance between security and liberty and the limitations of surveillance and a 'safety net' preventing disorder and chaos.

== Reception ==
In The Boston Phoenix, Andy Gaus said that "Böll's simple and classic German style makes him one of the easiest modern German authors for a foreigner to read. But his narrative technique is more complex." Gaus felt that while "Trash novels are written every day about the beleaguered lives of high corporate execs," The Safety Net "is a contemporary art work in every way, and one notable for its avoidance of easy choices."
