= Dieter Laser =

German actor (1942–2020)

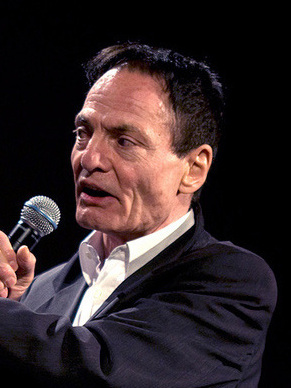
- Dieter Laser in April 2010
- Born: 17 February 1942; Kiel, Germany
- Died: 29 February 2020 (aged 78); Berlin, Germany
- Occupation: Actor
- Years active: 1968–2020

Klaus Dieter Laser (17 February 1942 – 29 February 2020) was a German actor. Laser's career spanned over five decades, appearing in both German and English-language productions. He achieved recognition for his lead role in the 2009 film The Human Centipede (First Sequence) and also starred in the third entry in 2015. On television, he had a recurring role on Lexx from 1998 to 2000.

== Biography ==
Laser was born in 1942 as the second child of his parents Oskar and Lore Laser. His older sister Heidi was also born in Kiel in 1939; she died on 3 November 1987. Dieter Laser spent his first year of life in Laboe near Kiel. When he was born, his father was an officer in the German Wehrmacht in Battle of France. In recognition of the invention of a new type of anchor that would enable landing craft to land even in high waves, he was transferred, at his request, to a unit that was building bunkers for U-boats in the port of Kiel after a visit to the Führer's headquarters in Berlin. This meant that he could spend almost a year with his wife and two children. Afterwards, Oskar Laser was ordered to the Eastern Front and was killed on 16 June 1943 near Orel, Soviet Union, during a "suicide mission", to which he had been assigned because of his Christian beliefs. At this time, Dieter Laser was barely 18 months old.

Dieter Laser was meanwhile evacuated from Laboe with his mother and sister due to constant air raids on Kiel. After several stops, the family came to Rothenburg ob der Tauber, where they experienced the end of the war in April 1945 under dramatic circumstances. Dieter Laser was rescued with his mother and sister by American soldiers from a burning air raid shelter. The three-year-old had been lying there next to a TB patient and also fell ill. The illness worsened so much that Dieter Laser had to be admitted to a hospital in Konstanz. After some time, with the support of a Christian community in Hamburg, his mother was able to take him to a home for children suffering from tuberculosis in Beatenberg in Switzerland. After he had recovered there, the family moved back to Rothenburg and from there to Hamburg via an apartment swap.

Dieter Laser grew up in Hamburg. His family belonged to a Christian community in which the only reading material permitted was the Luther Bible. He rejected the Christian faith and made a "contract with the devil" at the age of 14: "You will pay - but you will pay later." After he had to leave the Gymnasium shortly before his Abitur at the instigation of his mother, "because studying spoils faith", he left his parents' home and went into hiding in Hamburg. During his acting training he worked as an extra at the Deutsches Schauspielhaus Hamburg and as a hotel servant, but dropped out of his studies in 1960 after one year and despite passing the state intermediate examination.

In 1961, Laser, who continued to secretly attend rehearsals at the Hamburger Schauspielhaus, was "discovered" by Gustaf Gründgens when the latter wanted to throw him out of the auditorium. Laser was initially entrusted with small, then larger roles by Gründgens. "That's how I got into acting, because the god of theater was kind to me," Laser said looking back. From 1967 to 1974 he devoted himself to the theater. In 1967 he began working with Peter Stein. In 1970 he moved with Stein to the Berlin Schaubühne am Halleschen Ufer, where he was a member of the board of directors from 1971 to 1973. From 1974 Laser worked as a freelancer and with guest engagements at the Staatliche Schauspielbühnen Berlin and the Wiener Burgtheater, among others.

In the 1970s, Laser repeatedly appeared in front of the camera under the direction of Rainer Erler, with whom he made the five-part science fiction series Das Blaue Palais, in which he played the researcher Enrico Polazzo, and the film Operation Ganymed. For his acting performance in Ulf Miehe's directorial debut John Glückstadt based on a novella by Theodor Storm, Dieter Laser was awarded the German Film Award in 1975 in the category Best Actor. Two roles made him known to a wider audience in 1975: In the Tatort episode Kurzschluss directed by Wolfgang Petersen, he played the petty criminal Piet Kallweit and got involved in a fatal game with a police officer, played by Günter Lamprecht. On the big screen, Laser was seen in the same year as the shady newspaper reporter Tötges in The Lost Honour of Katharina Blum. In 1978 he played alongside Helmut Griem and Brigitte Fossey in Hans W. Geißendörfer's Oscar-nominated film drama The Glass Cell.

In the star-studded miniseries Väter und Söhne – Eine deutsche Tragödie by Bernhard Sinkel about the rise and fall of a German industrial family, he took on the role of Friedrich Deutz in 1986. In addition to guest appearances in various crime series, Dieter Laser continued to appear in cinemas in the 1990s in films such as Peter Sehr's Kasper-Hauser-film adaptation and Armin Mueller-Stahl's directorial debut Conversation with the Beast. In The Ogre in 1996, again directed by Volker Schlöndorff, he played the "race researcher" Professor Blättchen. In 2007 and 2008 he appeared on stage in the role of the Hun king Etzel at the Nibelungen Festival in Worms. In 2012, under the direction of Dieter Wedel, he played General Speckenschwardt in The Fortune of Mr. Süß.

In 2009, Laser played the surgeon Dr. Josef Heiter in the Dutch horror film Human Centipede by Tom Six, and became an international star. Roger Ebert praised his performance, although it was his 63rd role, as the one he was "born for." In order to make his portrayal as a bizarre parody close to the notorious Nazi doctor Josef Mengele, Laser specially obtained a "Eppendorfer doctor's coat" and suggested to the director that he should also give the character the first name Josef. For his acting performance, he received the acting award at the Fantastic Fest in Austin, Texas that same year.

Laser would appear again in the third and final part of the Human Centipede trilogy. On March 29, 2012, he announced his departure from the project due to profound creative differences. Shortly afterwards, Six Entertainment announced in an official press release that it would take legal action against Laser. At the beginning of 2013, both sides announced that they would now make the film together. Filming was completed in the middle of the same year. The German version was released in 2017. In an interview, Laser spoke about massive problems with the dubbed version.

In November 2015, Laser was in front of the camera in Estonia for the fantasy film Jesus’ Blood and Red Currants based on a novel by Andrus Kivirähk. The film had its international premiere under the title November at the Tribeca Film Festival in April 2017. Under the title Total Eclipse Laser announced his feature film directorial debut based on his own screenplay. In the summer of 2019, he played the role of the lawyer Huld in the production of Kafka's play The Trial at the Bad Hersfeld Festival.

Dieter Laser was married to Inge and lived with her in Berlin. He died twelve days after his 78th birthday on 29 February 2020. His death was not announced until a message to his official Facebook page was posted on 9 April 2020.

== Selected filmography ==
- 1968: In the Jungle of Cities (Im Dickicht der Städte), as Collie Couch alias "The Pavian"
- 1973: Desaster, as Alf Harden
- 1974: Ermittlungen gegen Unbekannt, as Günter Riegand
- 1974–1976: Das Blaue Palais (TV-series), as Enrico Polazzo
- 1975: John Glückstadt, as John Glückstadt
- 1975: The Lost Honour of Katharina Blum, as Werner Toetges
- 1975: The Last Holidays, as Miguel
- 1976: The Elixirs of the Devil, as Medardus
- 1977: Operation Ganymed, as Don
- 1978: Germany in Autumn, as Member of the board of TV producers
- 1978: The Glass Cell (Oscar nominated: Best Foreign Language Film), as David Reinald
- 1979: Union der festen Hand (TV film), as Adam Griguszies
- 1981: Don Quixote's Children, as Peter Senders
- 1982: Wir (based on We, the 1921 Russian novel by Yevgeny Zamyatin)
- 1986: Väter und Söhne – Eine deutsche Tragödie (mini series), as Friedrich Deutz
- 1990: The Man Inside, as Leonard Schroeter
- 1991: Meeting Venus, as Hans von Binder
- 1993: Kaspar Hauser, as Ludwig I. von Bayern
- 1996: Conversation with the Beast, as Peter Hollsten
- 1996: The Ogre, as Prof. Otto Blaettchen
- 1997: Shanghai 1937 (Hotel Shanghai), as Dr. Hain
- 1997: The Rat (TV film), as Bruno
- 2000: Recycled, as Hasso von Walden
- 2002: Big Girls Don't Cry, as Mr. Winter
- 2002: Führer Ex, as Eduard Kellermann
- 2003: Baltic Storm, as Gehrig
- 2006: I Am the Other Woman, as Bruno
- 2009: The Human Centipede (First Sequence), as Dr. Josef Heiter
- 2010: Greed (TV film), as General Klaus Habenicht
- 2015: The Human Centipede 3 (Final Sequence), as Bill Boss
- 2017: November, as Baron
