= Billiards at Half-Past Nine =

German novel by Heinrich Böll

- First edition
- Author: Heinrich Böll
- Original title: Billard um halb zehn
- Translator: Patrick Bowles
- Language: German
- Publisher: Kiepenheuer & Witsch
- Publication date: 1959
- Publication place: West Germany
- English publication date: 1961
- Pages: 304

Billiards at Half-Past Nine (German: Billard um halb zehn) is a 1959 novel by the German author Heinrich Böll. The entirety of the narrative takes place on a day in the autumn of 1958, with flashbacks, and characters' retellings from memory by the characters. It focuses on the Faehmel family's history, from the end of the 19th century, until that day; it largely reflects the opposition of the author (who won the Nobel Prize for Literature in 1972) to the period of Nazism, as well as his aversion to war in general.

== Plot ==
Leonore, Robert Faehmel's secretary, paints a picture of her meticulous boss, whose attention to detail permeates every aspect of his life. Despite the routine nature of her job, Leonore senses an air of unease, as if something extraordinary lurks beneath the surface.

When an old friend of Robert's arrives at the office seeking him, Leonore redirects him to the Prince Heinrich Hotel, where Robert can be reliably found each day from 9:30 to 11:00. It's a routine so ingrained that deviation seems unthinkable.

However, trouble looms over the Faehmel family, a dynasty of architects spanning three generations: Heinrich Faehmel, his son Robert, and Robert's own son Joseph. As Nettlinger, the visitor seeking Robert's audience, is turned away by the steadfast hotel concierge Jochen, it becomes clear that disruptions to Robert's routine are unwelcome and potentially portend greater upheaval for the Faehmel clan.

Upstairs, Robert is telling bellboy Hugo about his life, and we discover that Nettlinger was once a Nazi policeman. Robert and his friend Schrella, both of whom were schoolmates of Nettlinger's, had opposed the Nazis, refusing to take "the Host of the Beast," a reference both to the devil and the Nazis. Schrella had disappeared after being beaten by Nettlinger and Old Wobbly, their gym teacher, also a Nazi policeman. Nettlinger and Old Wobbly had not only beaten Schrella and Robert, but had corrupted one of Robert's three siblings, Otto, who died in 1942 near Kyiv. His mother, Johanna Kilb, was committed to a mental institution because she tried to save Jews from the cattle cars going to the extermination camps. It is now Heinrich's 80th birthday. Heinrich and Robert meet in a bar after visiting Johanna, sitting down and talking for the first time in many years. Meanwhile, Schrella has returned to Germany and talks with Nettlinger, who tries to make amends for his past life despite the fact that he has not really changed, and remains an opportunist. Schrella goes to visit his old home.

We meet Joseph Faehmel and his girlfriend Marianne. Joseph has just learned that Robert was the one who destroyed the beautiful abbey his grandfather had built and this greatly upsets him. Marianne tells him the story of her own family: her father was a Nazi who committed suicide at the end of the war. Before taking his own life, he had ordered Marianne's mother to murder the children. She hanged Marianne's little brother but the arrival of some strangers prevented her from doing the same to Marianne.

Johanna, in control of her wits, leaves the sanatorium with a pistol which she intends to use on Old Wobbly for his past sins. The entire family gathers in the Prince Heinrich Hotel for the birthday party and Johanna shoots at a Secretary of State who was watching a military parade from a hotel balcony. This act was intended to signal Johanna's inadaptation in a society ruled by "The Buffalo", whose members already forgot the horrors of the world. At the conclusion, Robert adopts the bellhop Hugo. A birthday cake shaped like the abbey is carried in. Heinrich slices it and hands the first piece to his son.

== Analysis ==
=== Themes ===
The major theme of the book is the conflict between those who received "The Host of the Beast" and their opponents, the receivers of "The Host of the Lamb". Although this separation can be seen as Nazi versus pacifists, it has a deeper meaning: the "Lamb" followers are the free-thinking, kind-hearted ones, not willing to oppress other people while the "Beast" worshippers include the aggressors, the indifferent mass, the ones who subjugate, the accomplices of Totalitarianism. The main culprit is Paul von Hindenburg, referred as "The Big Beast".

=== Form and structure ===
The majority of the story does not take place in the present, but rather we learn most of the plot through the use of flashbacks, characters remembering something from their past or relating a story from their life to another person. This complex plot structure allows the characters to be more fully explored as things do not simply happen to them, but are built upon and remembered in a certain way. Each character's story is coloured by the emotions they experience as they remember events from years past. They, as well as the reader, are well aware of the significance of these events for their present-day lives.

The effect of their actions is readily seen by the reader because almost everything that happens in the novel has already happened in the characters' pasts. The connections between the different family members are also very strong because of the flashbacks and retellings. Heinrich, Robert and Joseph's stories are linked by the central motif of St. Anthony's Abbey and by the wars and turmoil that they all experience through the years.

=== Point of view ===
The point of view of the novel is very important and the rotating first person perspective gives the story its deep insight. Eleven different characters take it in turns to offer a first-person perspective and the point of view shifts with every chapter. The first is narrated by Robert's secretary, Leonore, the second by the old bellhop Jochen, the third by Robert, the fourth by Heinrich, the fifth by his wife Johanna, the sixth by Robert again, the seventh by both Schrella and Nettlinger, the eighth by Joseph Faehmel and his fiancée Marianne, the ninth by Schrella, the tenth by both Robert and his daughter Ruth, the eleventh is again told from the perspective of Johanna, the twelfth and thirteenth by nearly every different character in the story. Some of these chapters are in the first person and others feature third person omniscient narration, but every chapter follows the thoughts of a single specific character.

This multitude of narrators is central to the novel. In the beginning, we first meet Robert, through his secretary, followed by Jochen; it is not until the third chapter that we come face to face with the protagonist. We meet Heinrich Faehmel in the first chapter, but only through the eyes of Leonore, the secretary. Our perception of the characters is shaped by the perspective of the narrator in question. Although this reduces the reliability of the narration, the multiplicity of points of view is key to the story. The subjective retellings may reflect the Faehmels' government and the Nazis trying to brainwash their country and its people.

In the story, however, the perspectives presented offer many different views of the characters. The relationships between father and son, husband and wife, friend and schoolmate, and dissenter and blind follower are examined from many different perspectives. Through his father we see Robert, through Robert we see Schrella and through Schrella, Nettlinger. Since every character is discussed by several narrators, we gain a fuller insight into the various traits and backgrounds of each one.

=== Allusions/references to actual history, geography and current science ===
Most of the plot takes place in the city of Cologne, a direct reflection of Böll's personal history. Böll was born in Cologne and saw it taken over by the Nazis then bombed in its entirety by the Allies towards the end of the war. Cologne was a cultural capital of Germany and the bombing not only destroyed the entire city, but also killed 20,000 civilians.

In the city, much of the action takes place in the Prince Heinrich Hotel, where Robert plays billiards every weekday. The hotel, and more specifically the billiard room, is a place around which Robert structures his routine. After the unsettling stupidity of the war, Robert relishes his routine and the habits he needs to make his life ordered again. He doesn't even really play billiards; "for some time now he had given up playing according to the rules, trying for runs, racking up points," (p. 31). For Robert, it's not about winning or losing, it's the physics of the game, of the action and reaction and the laws of science that stay constant no matter what. "Energy of the blow imparted to the ball by cue, plus a little friction, question of degree…and behold, impulse was converted into momentary figures," (p. 31) as the balls bounce off of each other. In the billiards room, Robert is able to do everything precisely how he wants, in his ordered fashion, contrasting to the world outside the hotel where Robert had to deal with the unpredictable stupidity of war. Even when he was in the war, he reduced his demolitions to stress and give. "He's never been interested in the creative side of architecture," Joseph observes about his father. "Only in the formulas," (p. 192). Robert thus goes to the Hotel on his precise schedule to play a game of scientific certainty as he tries to escape from the memories of war and regain some sort of certainty in his life.

St. Anthony Abbey, though not a place where much of the plot takes place, is a setting that is pivotal in the Faehmel family. Heinrich Faehmel built it as a budding young architect. In fact, it was his first commission after he entered a design competition against better-known architects and won. Many years later, in the waning days of World War II, his son Robert demolished the abbey. He was in the German army under the command of a general he called "off his rocker, and the only idea in his one-track mind was 'field of fire,' " (p. 63) the idea of destroying everything in your path. In this case, the Abbey "lay exactly between two armies, one German, the other American," (p. 63). Although Robert said that the German army needed a field of fire "like a hole in the head," he destroyed it all the same, "just three days before the war ended" (p. 63), as a punishment for the monks who supported war. Later in the novel, Robert's son Joseph is presented as an architect who helps rebuild the Abbey. After he learns that it was his father who demolished it, he abandons the reconstruction project, not willing to participate any more. Even his career in architecture is in doubt. Although initially Heinrich is greatly affected by the Abbey's destruction (he had "walked through the rubble of the Abbey…mumbling what the peasants were mumbling, what Grandmother had always muttered in the air-raid shelter, whywhywhy" (p. 201), he finally becomes reconciled to it, regarding it as an insignificant loss compared with the loss of actual human lives. At the very end of the novel, at Heinrich's birthday party, there is a model of St. Anthony's made from cake. Joseph and Robert's adopted son Hugo bring the cake in and watch Heinrich "cut off the spire of the Abbey first, and passed the plate to Robert," (p. 280). They have reconciled and their family history has become emblematic of Germany's history in the setting of St. Anthony Abbey.

The fictional St. Anthony Abbey is thought to have been inspired by the actual Maria Laach Abbey, whose monks were accused of collaborating with the Nazi regime.

== Adaptations ==
In 1965, Billiards at Half-Past Nine was made into a film entitled Not Reconciled directed by Jean-Marie Straub and Danielle Huillet.
