= The Father of a Murderer =

Narrative story by Alfred Andersch

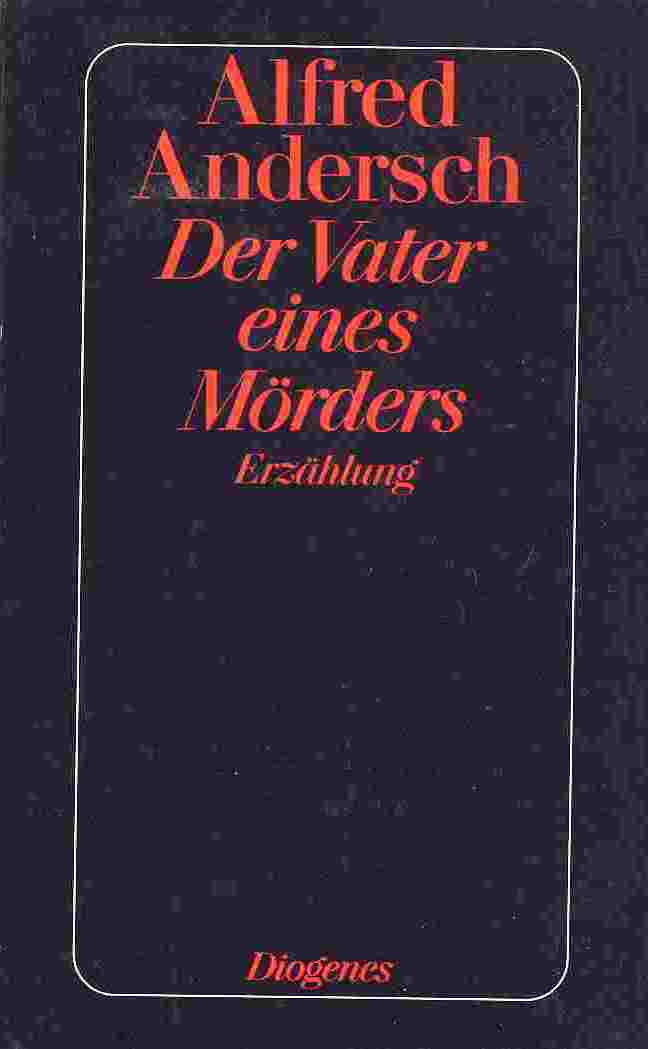
Book cover of Alfred Andersch "The father of a murderer" 1980

The Father of a Murderer is the last narrative written by German author Alfred Andersch. It was published in 1980, the year that Andersch died, and describes a 1928 school lesson attended by grammar school student Franz Kien. The story is considered to be partly autobiographical. The protagonist is Joseph Gebhard Himmler, the father of Heinrich Himmler. Joseph Gebhard Himmler had been Andersch's schoolmaster.

An English translation of Andersch's German original was published in 1994.

- The Father of a Murderer, New Directions, ISBN 978-0-8112-1261-8
