= The Clown (novel) =

1963 novel by Heinrich Böll

- First edition
- Author: Heinrich Böll
- Language: German
- Publisher: Kiepenheuer & Witsch
- Publication date: 1963
- Publication place: West Germany
- Media type: Print (Paperback)
- Pages: 303 pp

The Clown (German: Ansichten eines Clowns, lit. "Views of a clown") is a 1963 novel by West German writer Heinrich Böll.

== Plot ==
Hans Schnier is the "Clown" of the novel's title. He is a twenty-seven years old agnostic from a very wealthy family. At the beginning of the story he arrives in Bonn, Germany. As a clown, he had to travel across the country from city to city to perform as an artist. He always sees himself as an artist. His home is in Bonn, so he has to stay in hotels when he is not in Bonn. The woman he has been living with, Marie, has left him to marry another man, Zupfner. Therefore, Hans has become depressed. He wants to get Marie back from Zupfner, and also has serious financial problems.

He describes himself as a clown with no church affiliation. His parents, devout Protestants, sent him to a Catholic school. He met Marie in school and fell in love with her. Although Marie was a Catholic, she agreed to live with him. They never got legally married, largely because Hans would not agree to sign a paper agreeing to raise his children as Catholics. He did not even want to get a marriage license, because he thought that they were for people who did not go to church. While living together, they never had any children. Marie always stated that even though she was living in sin, she was still a Catholic. Once in high school, Hans saw her holding hands with Zupfner, but she told him that Zupfner was only a friend. Hans brought her along on every trip and took her everywhere he went. After five years, there was a Catholic conference near their hotel in a German city. Marie wanted to breathe some Catholic air and ask Hans to go there. Hans had a performance at the same time. When they arrived late at night, he fell asleep. The next morning, he discovered Marie was gone, but had left a note. He never saw her again. The note read: “I must take the path that I must take.”

Hans has a mystical peculiarity, as he can detect smells through the telephone. As he explains, he does not only suffer from depression, headaches, laziness and that mystical ability, but also suffers from his disposition to monogamy. There is only one woman that he can live with: Marie. His reversal of values is clearly shown in his statement: "I believe that the living are dead, and that the dead live, not the way Protestants and Catholics believe it."

When he goes to his home in the Bonn, the first person he meets is his millionaire father. He remembers all of his memories from the past. He had a sister named Henrietta. The family forced her to volunteer for anti-aircraft duty seventeen years ago and she never came back. He also has a brother named Leo. He recently converted to Catholicism and is studying theology in college. Hans tells his father about his financial problems. After his father offers him to work for him for a relatively low wage, Hans rejects the offer. He tells his father that he and his brother never benefited from the wealth of their family. War has affected the family. They were never given enough food or pocket money. Many things were regarded as extravagances. Thus, he lacks any positive memories of the past, which may have been a factor that drove him, at age 21, to leave home to become a clown.

He calls many of his relatives in Bonn, but nobody can help him. He soon discovers that Marie is now in Rome on her honeymoon. This news only depresses him more. Finally, he calls his brother, Leo, who promises to bring him money the next day. But, in the middle of the conversation, Leo says that he has talked to Zupfner about something and that they became friends. Because Leo has converted to Catholicism, his father no longer supports him. Therefore, Leo is not in a good position financially. In anger, Hans tells him not to come to bring the money. At the end, Hans takes his guitar to the train station and plays as people throw coins into his hat.

== Social issues ==
Böll's novel reflects the German society under Hitler and in the postwar years. It criticises many aspects of society such as political and religious beliefs, marriage issues, the conflict between Catholics and Protestants, the effect of war on families (a millionaire one), and many other things in the society of Germany. Heinrich Böll revealed all of those postwar problems and related them to some psychological aspects that harmed a man with some weird beliefs like Hans.

Böll sought to focus on the role of the Roman Catholic Church, to exhibit its role in Europe. He includes a depiction of establishment moralities and politics in the novel. The church limited the relations between Catholics and Protestants, and it categorized German society into religious groups. Although the Protestants are shown as richer people in the novel, Böll portrays society was mainly under the influence of Catholics, especially in political and moral issues. The protagonist Hans does not get any benefit from either group. He is shown as a kind of pagan, but a pagan who has some Protestant and Catholic relatives and participates in some ceremonies of both religions — although his beliefs are quite different from either. Even his clown's art does not win approval from some political parties, although he is a great performer. But after he injures his left knee, he is unable to perform as well as before. In conclusion, he describes the age in this statement: "If our era deserves a name, it would have to be called the era of prostitution."

== Conflicts ==
There are some conflicts in the story, mainly on character versus society. In fact, it was religion, that takes his wife away and saw him ineligible to have a Catholic wife. Also, this novel indicates that only a written license determines the marriage of a couple. The second important conflict is character versus himself. Hans had his unique ideology about life. However, after Marie left him, he became desperate. He started to talk to himself and to become mentally ill. For example, when he wanted to put on his makeup, he started to stare at himself in the mirror for minutes and he thought that there is someone else looking at him. There was a kind of phobia when he looked at the mirror. Other than that, he could easily accept the offer of his father or do not care about the friendship of his brother, Leo, with Zupfner, but he was loyal to himself and he did not sell his ideologies for money. Character versus character can be considered in the story of Hans trying to win Marie back. At that point he had conflict with Zupfner and even Marie. As well, there were conflicts with his father and his brother as well, for the financial issues and for their past.

== Themes ==
There are some major themes based on the social conflicts in the novel. The first one states that the Christian ethic and spirituality was corruptive during the post war years in German society or even in Europe. Many examples in the Social Issues section support this statement. The second major theme is the loss of traditional familial and social unity. Hans was a clown but from a millionaire family. His family never supported him, even when he came back and asked for money. His brother came out of the support of the family when he converted to Catholicism. Furthermore, regarding Hans lost his sister during the war, his family preferred not to waste their wealth for their two sons. On the other side, Marie left him after five years because of the effects that forced her to feel sinful about her life and leave him to marry another person. All of these examples indicate the social unity and the families have some main problems. The third theme is there is no place for an artist with different ideologies from the people ruling the society. Although during the postwar years Germany did not have a dictator like Hitler to classify the people in the society, the effect of those years made the society do it automatically and indirectly based on ideologies of people.

== Reactions ==
Following publication in 1963, the novel generated polemics in the press for its negative portrayal of the Catholic Church and the CDU party. Böll's liberal views on religion and social issues inspired the wrath of conservatives in Germany. The conservative press even attacked Böll's 1972 Nobel prize award, arguing that it was awarded only to "liberals and left-wing radicals."

Martin Seymour-Smith in the 1970s wrote: "It is not today easy for a Catholic writer to convince readers that an anti-Catholic who ends as a beggar is possessed of more grace than the Catholics who populate the novel; but Ansichten eines Clowns does so, and its stark power is a reminder of Böll's capacity to deal with exceedingly complicated and contentious material and to make it coherent and moving".
