= Conversation with the Beast =

1996 German film

- Gespräch mit dem Biest
- Directed by: Armin Mueller-Stahl
- Written by: Armin Mueller-Stahl; Tom Abrams
- Starring: Armin Mueller-Stahl; Bob Balaban; Katharina Böhm
- Release date: 1996

Conversation with the Beast (German: Gespräch mit dem Biest) is a 1996 German film directed by Armin Mueller-Stahl, and written by Mueller-Stahl and Tom Abrams. The film is about an American researcher (played by Bob Balaban), who interviews a 103-year-old man claiming to be Adolf Hitler. The film was released on 10 September 1996 at the 1996 Toronto International Film Festival, shown at over twenty film festivals worldwide, but never released on video.

== Plot ==
The film is based on the idea that Adolf Hitler, the "beast" of the film title, is still alive—hidden in a bunker—at the age of 103 (in 1992). The protagonist sits in a wheelchair and speaks English. This "real" Hitler invites six Hitler doubles into the bunker, furnished with Nazi paraphernalia, in which he lives with his apparently very young wife Hortense. Webster, an American journalist, breaks into the bunker and asks uncomfortable questions. He interviews the self-proclaimed Hitler for ten days before shooting him on the last day of the interview, as he is now sure that he is facing the real Hitler.

== Cast ==
- Armin Mueller-Stahl as Hitler
- Bob Balaban as Webster
- Katharina Böhm as Hortense
- Hark Bohm as Dr. Hassler
- Peter Fitz as Dr. Segebrecht
- Dieter Laser as Peter Hollsten
- Joachim Dietmar Mues as Heinrich Pfarmann
- Kai Rautenberg as Horst Sievers
- Harald Juhnke as Hitler double
- Otto Sander as Hitler double

== See also ==
- Downfall (2004 film)
