= And Never Said a Word =

1953 novel by Heinrich Böll

First edition (publ. Kiepenheuer & Witsch)

And Never Said a Word (German: Und sagte kein einziges Wort) is a novel by German author Heinrich Böll, published in 1953. The novel deals with the thoughts and actions of Fred and Käte Bogner, a married couple. Fred, feeling sick of the poverty of their house, has left her with their three children. They continue to meet on a casual basis every time Fred can find money enough to book a hotel room. As in numerous works from the German writer, the main theme is the situation in Germany after World War II.

The title stems from a song listened to by Käte in the fourth chapter, creating a parallel between her and Jesus; like Christ, she is shown bearing all humiliations without rebelling.

== See also ==
- 1953 in literature
- German literature
