= Group Portrait with Lady (novel) =

1971 novel by Heinrich Böll

First edition (publ. Kiepenheuer & Witsch)

Group Portrait with Lady (German: Gruppenbild mit Dame) is a 1971 novel by Nobel Prize winning author Heinrich Böll. The novel is concerned with a woman named Leni Pfieffer (née Gruyten) who faces eviction from her apartment building in Cologne. It structured as a report compiled from interviews conducted by an unnamed author with Leni’s friends, family, employers, coworkers, and others, forming a detailed social portrait of life in Cologne from the 1910s to 1971. Like many of Böll's novels, there is a particular focus on representing the Nazi era from the perspective of ordinary people.

The Nobel Prize committee referred to Group Portrait with Lady as Böll’s "most grandly conceived work."

The novel was adapted into a film in 1977.
