= A Soldier's Legacy =

1982 novel by Heinrich Böll

First edition (publ. Lamuv Verlag)

A Soldier's Legacy (German: Das Vermächtnis) is a novel by German author Heinrich Böll, published in 1982 (translator: Leila Vennewitz).

Written in 1948, the narrator writes about his dead friend Schelling, revealing his murder by the hated captain Schnecker.
