= Alfred Andersch =

German writer, publisher, and radio editor (1914–1980)

- Born: 4 February 1914; Munich, Germany
- Died: 21 February 1980 (aged 66); Berzona, Ticino, Switzerland
- Occupations: Writer, publisher, and radio editor

Alfred Hellmuth Andersch (pronounced [ˈalfʁeːt ˈʔandɐʃ]; 4 February 1914 – 21 February 1980) was a German writer, publisher, and radio editor. The son of a conservative East Prussian army officer, he was born in Munich, Germany, and died in Berzona, Ticino, Switzerland. Martin Andersch, his brother, was also a writer.

== Life ==
His parents were Alfred Andersch (1875–1929) and his wife Hedwig, née Watzek (1884–1976). His school master was Joseph Gebhard Himmler, the father of Heinrich Himmler. He wrote about this in The Father of a Murderer.

=== 1914 to 1945 ===
In 1930, after an apprenticeship as a bookseller, Andersch became a youth leader in the Communist Party. As a consequence, he was held for six months in the Dachau concentration camp in 1933. He then left the party and entered a depressive phase of "total introversion". It was during this period that he first became engaged in the arts, adopting the stance that became known as innere Emigration ("internal emigration") – despite remaining in Germany, he was spiritually opposed to Hitler's regime.

In 1940, Andersch was conscripted into the Wehrmacht, but deserted at the Arno Line in Italy on 6 June 1944. He was interned at Camp Ruston, Louisiana and other POW camps among German prisoners of war in the United States. He became the editor of a prisoners' newspaper, Der Ruf (The Call).

A critical review of Andersch's "internal émigré" status, his marriage to a German Jew and subsequent divorce in 1943, as well as of his writing, may be read in W.G. Sebald's "Between the Devil and the Deep Blue Sea" attached to his essay On the Natural History of Destruction. Sebald accused Andersch of having presented through literature a version of his life (and of the "internal emigration" more generally) that made it sound more acceptable to a post-Nazi public.

=== 1945 to 1980 ===
Having returned to Germany, he worked from 1945 as an editing assistant for Erich Kästner's Neue Zeitung in Munich. From 1946 to 1947, he worked alongside Hans Werner Richter to publish the monthly literary journal Der Ruf, which was sold in the American occupation zone of Germany. The publication was discontinued following the non-renewal of its license by the U.S military government. Presumably, the discontinuation of "Der Ruf" followed "promptings by the Soviet authorities, provoked by Hans Werner Richter's open letter to the French Stalinist, Marcel Cachin." In the following years, Andersch worked with the literary circle Group 47, members of which included the authors Ingeborg Bachmann, Wolfgang Hildesheimer, Arno Schmidt, Hans Magnus Enzensberger and Helmut Heissenbüttel, among others. 1948 saw the publication of Andersch's essay "Deutsche Literatur in der Entscheidung" (German Literature at the Turning Point), in which he concluded, in the spirit of the American post-war "re-education" programme, that literature would play a decisive role in the moral and intellectual changes in Germany.

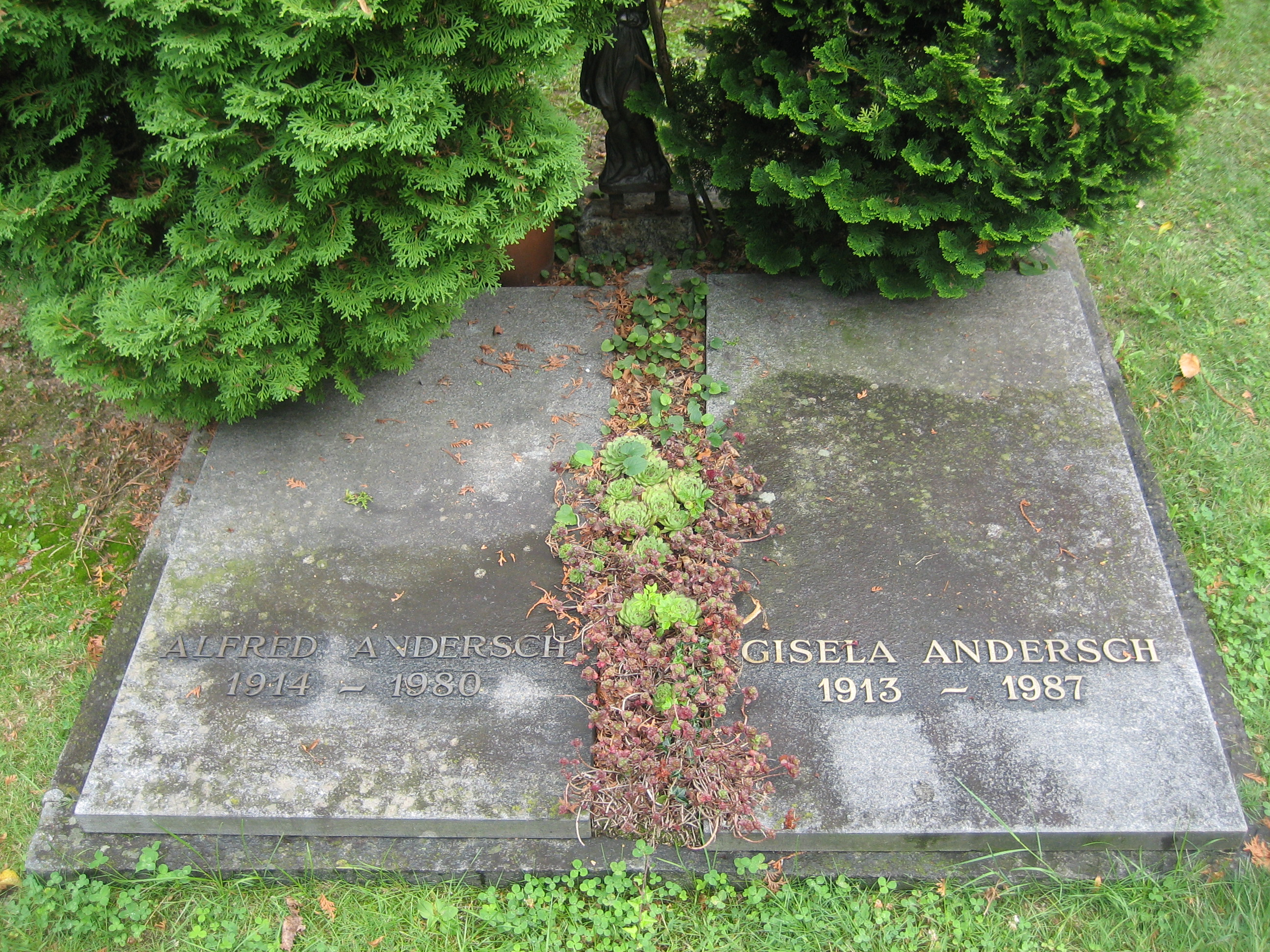
Andersch’s grave

Beginning in 1948, Andersch was a leading figure at radio stations in Frankfurt and Hamburg. In 1950, he married the painter Gisela Dichgans. His autobiographical work The Cherries of Freedom (Die Kirschen der Freiheit) was published in 1952, in which Andersch dealt with the experience of his wartime desertion and interpreted it as the "turning point" (Entscheidung) at which he could first feel free. On a similar theme, he published in 1957 perhaps the most significant work of his career, Flight to Afar (Sansibar oder der letzte Grund). A few of Andersch's books were turned into films.

From 1958, Andersch lived in Berzona in Switzerland, where he became mayor in 1972. After Sansibar followed the novels Die Rote in 1960, Efraim in 1967, and, in 1974, Winterspelt, which is, thematically, very similar to Sansibar, but is more complex in its composition. In 1977, he published the poetry anthology empört euch der himmel ist blau [sic]. Alfred Andersch died on 21 February 1980 in Berzona, Ticino. The incomplete story Der Vater eines Mörders (The Father of a Murderer) was published posthumously in the same year.

== Themes ==
Alfred Andersch is considered an author of critical post-war literature. In his novels, narratives, audiobooks, and few poems, the key theme is the individual's freedom of will. To elaborate on this, his autobiographic report The Cherries of Freedom was published in 1952, in which Andersch took on his own experience of desertion from the Wehrmacht and subsequently interpreted it as a choice towards freedom in an existential sense.

The novel Flight to Afar takes up this theme again, as well as the following works The Redhead and Efraim, which play through the theme in a contemporary setting. Efraim's protagonist is an emigrated Jewish journalist, who partakes in a desperate effort to escape from his reality by introducing himself, a person corroded by self-doubt, into his novel as a fictional character.

Rather than a traditional narration style, Andersch often used assemblages in form of documentaries, citations, and other narrative elements. One example of that would be his novel Winterspelt. A work that is close in style to the one of James Joyce, in which assemblage techniques such as commentary, inner monologues, and chronicle insertions create a war-like atmosphere that tells the story of desertion as an opportunity for one’s individual and collective freedom. Andersch also considered his audiobook Der Tod des James Dean, a story that contains texts of John Dos Passos, a radio assemblage.

== Works ==
=== Critical edition ===
On 21 February 2005, to commemorate the 25th anniversary of Andersch's death, Diogenes Press released a critical edition of his complete works. The ten volumes also include previously unpublished texts that come from his estate.

- Gesammelte Werke in 10 Bänden in Kassette, 5952 S., Zürich / Schweiz, Diogenes Verlag, Leinen, ISBN 3-257-06360-1.

=== Individual works ===
- Deutsche Literatur in der Entscheidung; essay, 1948
- Die Kirschen der Freiheit; autobiography, 1952. The Cherries of Freedom: A Report, translated by Michael Hulse (2004)
- Sansibar oder der letzte Grund novel, 1957. Flight to Afar, translated by Michael Bullock (1961). Filmed twice, first as Sansibar (1961), director Rainer Wolffhardt, then as Sansibar oder der letzte Grund (1987), director Bernhard Wicki.
- Geister und Leute. Zehn Geschichten (1958). The Night of the Giraffe and Other Stories, translated by Christa Armstrong (1964)
- Die Rote; novel, 1960; New Edition 1972. The Redhead translated by Michael Bullock (1961). Filmed as Redhead (1962).
- Efraim; novel, 1967
- Mein Verschwinden in Providence; stories, 1971. My Disappearance in Providence, and other stories, translated by Ralph Manheim
- Winterspelt; novel, 1974. Winterspelt, translated by Richard and Clara Winston (1978). Filmed as Winterspelt (1979)
- Das Alfred Andersch Lesebuch; selected works, 1979
- Der Vater eines Mörders; 1980. The Father of a Murderer, translated by Leila Vennewitz (1994)
- Arno Schmidt, Der Briefwechsel mit Alfred Andersch; letters, 1985
- Fahrerflucht; radio play

=== Bibliography of primary works ===
- Bibliografie des Deutschen Literaturarchivs Marbach am Neckar (German link)

=== Bibliography of secondary works ===
- Bibliografie der Sekundärliteratur zum Werk von Alfred Andersch von Daniela Unterwieser (German link)
- 38 Nachweise von Sekundärliteratur zu Alfred Andersch aus der MLA-Bibliography 1981–1998 (German link)
