= The Bread of Those Early Years (novel) =

1955 novella by Heinrich Böll

- First edition
- Author: Heinrich Böll
- Original title: Das Brot der frühen Jahre
- Language: German
- Publisher: Kiepenheuer & Witsch
- Publication date: 1955
- Publication place: West Germany
- English publication date: 1957

The Bread of Those Early Years (German: Das Brot der frühen Jahre) is a 1955 novella by the West German writer Heinrich Böll. It concerns Walter Fendrich, a young man living alone in a post-war German city (probably based on Cologne), making ends meet as a washing machine repair man. The story takes place on a single March day in 1949 when Walter meets the daughter of a family friend, whom he is supposed to help settle into her student lodgings. So enraptured is he by Hedwig that he sees his whole life anew — the death of his mother, his relationship with his father, postwar privations and his negative experiences as an apprentice. Whether Walter can truly expect his epiphany to be life-transforming, however, is a question that will be in the reader's mind as the story unfolds.

The novella was adapted into a 1962 film with the same title.

== German text ==
- Das Brot der frühen Jahre, Kiepenheuer & Witsch, 1955
- Das Brot der frühen Jahre, Heinemann, with an introduction by James Alldridge, 1965 (reprinted 1981)

== English translations ==
- The Bread of those Early Years, translated by Leila Vennewitz, European Classics, 1994
- The Bread of those Early Years, translated and illustrated by Rachel A H Beckett, unpublished, 2019; this also has an Afterword containing a critical analysis of the novel
