= Heinrich Böll =

German writer (1917–1985)

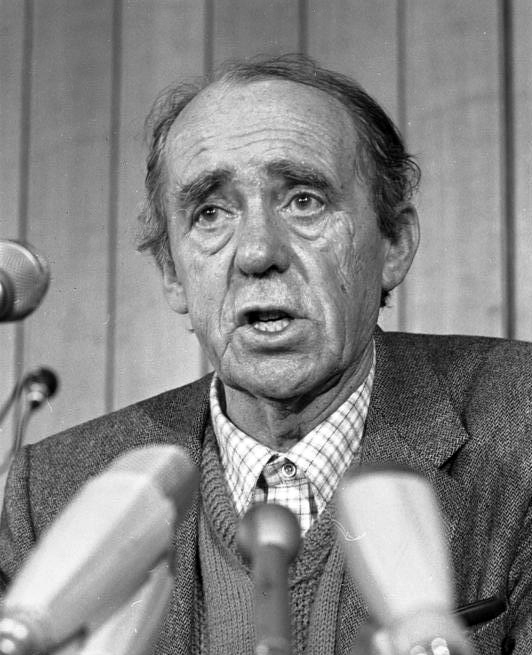
- Böll in 1981
- Born: Heinrich Theodor Böll; 21 December 1917; Cologne, Prussia, German Empire
- Died: 16 July 1985 (aged 67); Langenbroich, West Germany
- Writing career
- Notable awards: Georg Büchner Prize; 1967; Nobel Prize in Literature; 1972

Heinrich Theodor Böll (/bɜːrl/; German: [ˈhaɪnʁɪç ˈteːodoːɐ̯ ˈbœl]; 21 December 1917 – 16 July 1985) was a German writer. Considered one of Germany's foremost post–World War II writers, Böll received the Georg Büchner Prize (1967) and the Nobel Prize for Literature (1972).

== Biography ==
Böll was born in Cologne, Germany, to a Roman Catholic and pacifist family that later opposed the rise of Nazism. Böll refused to join the Hitler Youth during the 1930s. He was apprenticed to a bookseller before studying German studies and classics at the University of Cologne.

Conscripted into the Wehrmacht, he served in Poland, France, Romania, Hungary and the Soviet Union. In 1942, Böll married Annemarie Cech, with whom he had three sons; she later collaborated with him on a number of different translations into German of English-language literature. During his war service, Böll was wounded four times and contracted typhoid. He was captured by US Army soldiers in April 1945 and sent to a prisoner-of-war camp.

After the war, he returned to Cologne and began working in his family's cabinet shop and, for one year, worked in a municipal statistical bureau, a job he did not enjoy and which he left in order to take the risk of becoming a writer instead.

Böll became a full-time writer at the age of 30. His first novel, Der Zug war pünktlich (The Train Was on Time), was published in 1949. He was invited to the 1949 meeting of the Group 47 circle of German authors and his work was deemed to be the best presented in 1951. Many other novels, short stories, radio plays, and essay collections followed.

== Awards, honours and appointments ==
Böll was extremely successful and was lauded on a number of occasions. In 1953 he was awarded the Culture Prize of German Industry, the Southern German Radio Prize and the German Critics' Prize. In 1954 he received the prize of the Tribune de Paris. In 1955 he was given the French prize for the best foreign novel. In 1958 he won the Eduard von der Heydt prize of the city of Wuppertal and the prize of the Bayerische Akademie der Schönen Künste (Bavarian Academy of Fine Arts). In 1959 he was given the Great Art Prize of the State of North-Rhine-Westphalia and the Literature Prize of the city of Cologne, and was elected to the Academy of Science and the Arts in Mainz.

In 1960 he became a member of the Bavarian Academy of Fine Arts and gained the Charles Veillon Prize.

In 1967 he was given the Georg Büchner Prize.

In 1972 he received the Nobel Prize for Literature "for his writing which through its combination of a broad perspective on his time and a sensitive skill in characterization has contributed to a renewal of German literature".

He was given a number of honorary awards up to his death, such as the membership of the American Academy of Arts and Letters in 1974, and the Ossietzky Medal of 1974 (the latter for his defence of and contribution to global human rights).

Böll was President of PEN International, the worldwide association of writers, from 1971 to 1973.

Böll was elected to the American Philosophical Society in 1983 and the American Academy of Arts and Sciences in 1984.

== Works ==
His work has been translated into more than 30 languages, and he remains one of Germany's most widely read authors. His best-known works are Billiards at Half-past Nine (1959), And Never Said a Word (1953), The Bread of Those Early Years (1955), The Clown (1963), Group Portrait with Lady (1971), The Lost Honour of Katharina Blum (1974), and The Safety Net (1979).

Despite his work's variety of themes and content, certain patterns recur: much of his work describes intimate and personal life struggling to sustain itself against the wider background of war, terrorism, political divisions, and profound economic and social transition. Many of his books have stubborn and eccentrically individualistic protagonists who oppose the mechanisms of the state or of public institutions.

Böll was a devoted pacifist because of his war experiences. All of his writing and novels during the postwar years had to do with the war and making sure it never happened again. He encapsulated it in the phrase "never war again".

In his autobiography, Böll wrote that at the high school he attended when growing up under Nazi rule, an anti-Nazi teacher paid special attention to the Roman satirist Juvenal: "Mr. Bauer realized how topical Juvenal was, how he dealt at length with such phenomena as arbitrary government, tyranny, corruption, the degradation of public morals, the decline of the Republican ideal and the terrorizing acts of the Praetorian Guards. [...] In a secondhand bookshop I found an 1838 translation of Juvenal with an extensive commentary, twice the length of the translated text itself, written at the height of the Romantic period. Though its price was more than I could really afford, I bought it. I read all of it very intensely, as if it was a detective novel. It was one of the few books to which I persistently held on throughout the war [WWII] and beyond, even when most of my other books were lost or sold on the black market".

== Media scandals ==
The 1963 publication of The Clown was met with polemics in the press for its negative portrayal of the Catholic Church and the CDU party. Böll was devoted to Catholicism but also deeply critical of aspects of it, especially in its most conservative incarnations. In particular, he was unable to forget the Concordat of July 1933 between the Vatican and the Nazis, signed by the future Pope Pius XII, which helped confer international legitimacy on the regime early in its development.

Böll's liberal views on religion and social issues elicited German conservatives' wrath. When constitutional reforms were passed in 1968 that cracked down on freedom, Böll spoke out against them. His 1972 article Soviel Liebe auf einmal (So much love at once), which accused the tabloid Bild of falsified journalism, was in turn retitled, at the time of publishing and against Böll's wishes, by Der Spiegel, and the new title was used as a pretext to accuse Böll of sympathy with terrorism. This particular criticism was driven in large part by his repeated insistence on the importance of due process and the correct and fair application of the law in the case of the Baader-Meinhof Group. In his article for Der Spiegel titled Sixty Million against Six, he asked for a safeguard for Ulrike Meinhof in order to open a dialogue and prevent a major press campaign and police campaign. Böll was heavily criticized for this and dubbed "the spiritual father of the violence" by one journalist in the Springer press.

The conservative press even attacked Böll's 1972 Nobel Prize, arguing that it was awarded only to "liberals and left-wing radicals".

On 7 February 1974, the BZ, Berlin's most widely read newspaper at the time, reported that Böll's home had been searched. In fact, his home was searched only later that day, after the newspaper had already been circulated.

In 1977, after the abduction of Hanns Martin Schleyer, 40 police searched Böll's house based on an anonymous tip they received that named Böll's son as an accomplice to the kidnappers. This claim turned out to be unfounded. The Christian Democrats placed Böll on a blacklist after this incident.

== Influences ==
Böll was deeply rooted in his hometown of Cologne, with its strong Roman Catholicism and rather rough and drastic sense of humour. In the immediate postwar period, he was preoccupied with memories of the war and its effect—materially and psychologically—on ordinary people's lives. They are the heroes of his writing. His Catholicism was important to his work in ways that can be compared to writers such as Graham Greene and Georges Bernanos, though, as noted earlier, his perspective on Catholicism was critical and challenging, not passive.

Böll was deeply affected by the Nazi takeover of Cologne, as the Nazis essentially exiled him in his own town. Additionally, Cologne's destruction in the Allied bombing during World War II scarred him for life; he described the bombing's aftermath in The Silent Angel. Architecturally, the rebuilt Cologne, prosperous once more, left him indifferent. (Böll seems to have been an admirer of William Morris; he let it be known that he would have preferred that Cologne Cathedral be left unfinished, with the 14th-century wooden crane at the top, as it had stood in 1848). Throughout his life, he remained in close contact with Cologne's citizens, rich and poor. When he was in hospital, the nurses often complained about the "low-life" people who came to see their friend Böll.

Böll had a great fondness for Ireland, holidaying with his wife at their second home there, on the west coast. Their home in Ireland later became an artist's retreat.

== Analysis ==
Böll's work has been dubbed Trümmerliteratur (the literature of the rubble). He was a leader of the German writers who tried to come to grips with the memory of World War II, the Nazis, the Holocaust, and the guilt that came with them. Because of his refusal to avoid writing about the complexities and problems of the past, some called him the Gewissen der Nation ("conscience of the nation"), a catalyst and conduit for memorialization and discussion in opposition to the tendency toward silence and taboo. This was a label Böll was keen to jettison, because he felt that it occluded a fair audit of the institutions truly responsible for what had happened.

Böll lived with his wife in Cologne and in the Eifel region. He also spent time on Achill Island, off Ireland's west coast. His cottage there is now used as a guesthouse for international and Irish artists. He recorded some of his experiences in Ireland in his book Irish Journal; later, the people of Achill curated a festival in his honour. The Irish connection also influenced the translations into German by his wife Annemarie, which included works by Brendan Behan, J. M. Synge, G. B. Shaw, Flann O'Brien, and Tomás Ó Criomhthain.

Böll was president of the then West German P.E.N. and subsequently of the International P.E.N. organizations. He often traveled as a representative of the new, democratic Germany. His appearance and attitude completely contrasted with the boastful, aggressive type of German who had become infamous during Adolf Hitler's rule. Böll was particularly successful in Eastern Europe, as he seemed to portray the dark side of capitalism in his books, which sold by the millions in the Soviet Union alone.

When Aleksandr Solzhenitsyn was expelled from the Soviet Union, he first took refuge in Böll's Eifel cottage. This was in part the result of Böll's visit to the Soviet Union in 1962 with a cultural delegation, the first of several trips he made there, during which he made friendships with writers and connections with producers of dissident literature. With Solzhenitsyn's meeting, Böll responded to the criticism from both sides that branded him an instrument of anti-socialist propaganda or a stooge for the East Germans with the following statement: "perhaps many Germans do not read The Gulag Archipelago to experience the suffering of those to whom this monument is dedicated, but rather to forget the horror of their own history." As president of the West German P.E.N., Böll had recommended Solzhenitsyn for the Nobel Prize for Literature. When Solzhenitsyn received the prize in 1970, he quoted Böll's works to the reception committee.

In 1976, Böll publicly left the Catholic Church, "without falling away from the faith". He died in 1985 at the age of 67.

== Legacy and influence ==
Böll's memory lives on, among other places, at the Heinrich Böll Foundation. The Cologne Library set up the Heinrich Böll Archive to house his personal papers, bought from his family, but much of the material was damaged, possibly irreparably, when the building collapsed in 2009.

His cottage in Ireland has been used as a residency for writers since 1992.

Eric Andersen wrote a set of musical compositions based on Böll's books: Silent Angel: Fire and Ashes of Heinrich Böll (2017, Meyer Records).

== Selected bibliography ==
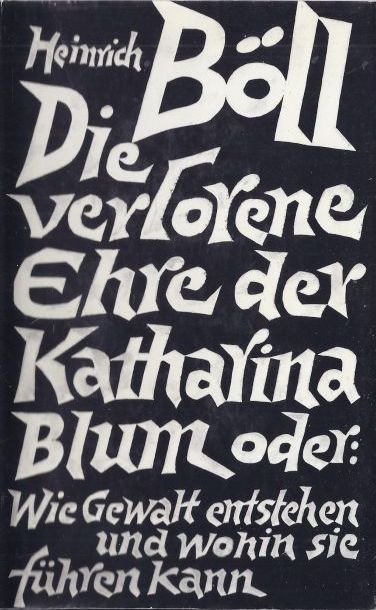
Book cover Die verlorene Ehre der Katharina Blum

- (1949) Der Zug war pünktlich (The Train Was on Time) – novel
- (1950) Wanderer, kommst du nach Spa… – short story
- (1951) Die schwarzen Schafe (Black Sheep) – short story
- (1951) Wo warst du, Adam? (Adam, Where Art Thou?; And Where Were You, Adam?) – novel
- (1952) Nicht nur zur Weihnachtszeit (Christmas Not Just Once a Year) – short story
- (1952) Die Waage der Baleks (The Balek Scales) – short story
- (1953) Und sagte kein einziges Wort (And Never Said a Word) – novel
- (1954) Haus ohne Hüter (The Unguarded House; Tomorrow and Yesterday) – novel
- (1955) Das Brot der frühen Jahre (The Bread of Those Early Years) – novel
- (1957) Irisches Tagebuch (Irish Journal) – travel writing
- (1957) Die Spurlosen (Missing Persons) – essays
- (1958) Doktor Murkes gesammeltes Schweigen (Murke's Collected Silences, 1963) – short story
- (1959) Billard um halb zehn (Billiards at Half-past Nine) – novel
- (1962) Ein Schluck Erde (A Mouthful of Earth) – play
- (1963) Ansichten eines Clowns (The Clown) – novel
- (1963) Anekdote zur Senkung der Arbeitsmoral (Anecdote Concerning the Lowering of Productivity) – short story
- (1964) Entfernung von der Truppe (Absent Without Leave) – two novellas
- (1966) Ende einer Dienstfahrt (The End of a Mission) – novel
- (1971) Gruppenbild mit Dame (Group Portrait with Lady) – novel
- (1974) Die verlorene Ehre der Katharina Blum (The Lost Honour of Katharina Blum) – novel
- (1979) Du fährst zu oft nach Heidelberg und andere Erzählungen (You Go to Heidelberg Too Often) – short stories
- (1979) Fürsorgliche Belagerung (The Safety Net) – novel
- (1981) Was soll aus dem Jungen bloß werden? Oder: Irgendwas mit Büchern (What's to Become of the Boy?) – autobiography of Böll's school years 1933–1937
- (1982) Vermintes Gelände
- (1982, written 1948) Das Vermächtnis (A Soldier's Legacy) – novel
- (1983) Die Verwundung und andere frühe Erzählungen (The Casualty) – unpublished stories from 1947–1952

=== Posthumous ===
- (1985) Frauen vor Flusslandschaft (Women in a River Landscape)
- (1986) The Stories of Heinrich Böll – U.S. release
- (1992, written 1949/50) Der Engel schwieg (The Silent Angel) – novel
- (1995) Der blasse Hund – unpublished stories from 1937 & 1946–1952
- (2002, written 1946–1947) Kreuz ohne Liebe
- (2004, written 1938) Am Rande der Kirche
- (2011) The Collected Stories – reissues of translations, U.S. release

=== Translations ===
More than 70 translations of Annemarie and Heinrich Böll are in the bibliography published in 1995 by Werner Bellmann: works of Brendan Behan, Eilis Dillon, O. Henry, Paul Horgan, Bernard Malamud, J. D. Salinger, George Bernard Shaw et al.

- Das harte Leben (The Hard Life, Brian O'Nolan), translated by Heinrich Böll, Hamburg, Nannen, 1966, 79. Illustrations by Patrick Swift.

== See also ==
- German literature
- List of German-language authors

Non-profit organization positions
Preceded by Pierre Emmanuel	International President of PEN International; 1971–1974	Succeeded by V. S. Pritchett
