= Luisa Francia =

German author and actress

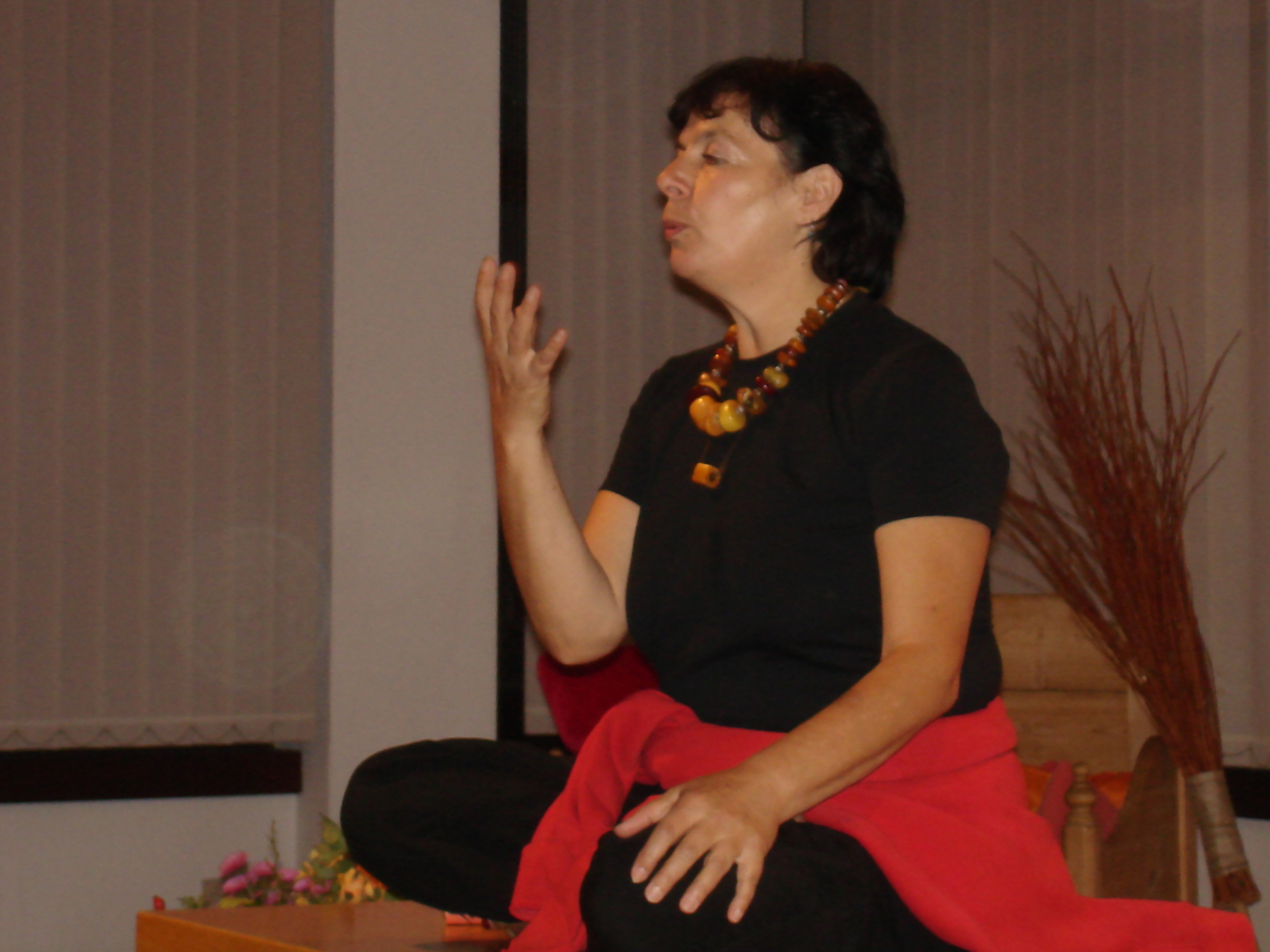
Image of Luisa Francia

Luisa Francia (born 2 August 1949 in Markt Grafing) is a German author and filmmaker. She sees herself as a modern witch.

== Life and work ==
Luisa Francia grew up in a family of women in Bavaria. She learnt mountaineering from her mother. She initially studied German language and literature, was a trainee at the Manchester Evening Star, sang in clubs and in the musical Hair and worked as a dance teacher for African dance.

From the 1980s, she travelled to Africa, India and Nepal several times in search of magical traditions, folk healing and shamanism and wrote reports and books about her experiences (including Waiting for Blue Wonders, The African Dream). In 1988, she received a scholarship from the German Literature Fund.

In her numerous publications, often in guidebook style, she deals with the topics of witches, tarot, horoscope interpretation, goddesses, female shamanism and gives instructions on how to create magical and meditative rituals for life stages and for women's everyday lives. She has also organised workshops and performances on these topics. Ariane Barth wrote about Francia's 1986 book Moon – Dance – Magic in Spiegel: "Anyone who reads her book about her creation of thirteen moon festivals will easily be seduced by the archaic power of this woman, seduced into a strange world in which modern intellectuality and magical ideas get on well together." In the early 1990s, she undertook a Kailash circumnavigation alone. Her book about female mountaineers was published in 1999 under the title Der untere Himmel. Women in Icy Heights.

Francia co-authored the screenplays for Margarethe von Trotta's feature film The Second Awakening of Christa Klages (1978), which won the German Film Award, and Schwestern oder Die Balance des Glücks (1979). She made her own films such as the documentary television feature film Hexen (1980) and wrote the theatre monologue Fischmaul (1986).

Francia is the best-known representative of the witchcraft scene, which emerged in Germany in the 1980s at the intersection of neo-paganism and feminism. Like the American Starhawk, she represents a socialist and feminist current.

== Personal life ==
Luisa Francia is the mother of a daughter; she lives near Munich and in Portugal.

== Publications ==
- Berühre Wega, kehr zur Erde zurück. Frauenoffensive, München 1982, ISBN 3-88104-120-6.
- Der Afrikanische Traum. Stechapfel, Zürich 1985.
- Mond, Tanz, Magie. Frauenoffensive, München 1986.
- Drachenzeit. Frauenoffensive, München 1987.
- Zaubergarn. Frauenoffensive, München 1989.
- Spielend Scheitern. Frauenoffensive, München 1990.
- Die schmutzige Frau. Frauenoffensive, München 1991.
- Die dreizehnte Tür. Frauenoffensive, München 1991.
- Warten auf Blaue Wunder. Der grüne Zweig 151 / Werner Piepers MedienXperimente, Löhrbach 1991.
- Steinreich. Frauenoffensive, München 1993, ISBN 3-88104-239-3.
- Starke Medizin: Handbuch zur Selbstheilung. Frauenoffensive, München 1995, ISBN 978-3-88104-266-6.
- Der untere Himmel. Frauen in eisigen Höhen. Nymphenburger, München 1999.
- Die Magie des Ankommens: Ein spirituelles Reisebuch zur Entdeckung starker Orte. Nymphenburger, München 2000, ISBN 3-485-00837-0.
- Der wilde Blick. Frauenoffensive, München 2000, ISBN 978-3-88104-328-1.
- Das magische Kochbuch. Rezepte und Geheimnisse von weisen Frauen, Mary Hahn Verlag, 2001.
- Die Sprache der Traumzeit. Kunst und Magie. Frauenoffensive, München 2002.
- Wohnungen der Geister. Nymphenburger Verlagsbuchhandlung, München 2002.
- Xamuma : Tagebuchnotizen und Reportagen aus Afrika. Pieper / Grüne Kraft, Löhrbach 2004, ISBN 3-922708-34-X (= Der grüne Zweig 216).
- Narrengold (Kriminalroman), Werner Pieper & The Grüne Kraft, Löhrbach 2004.
- Ballzauber. Die Magie des Fußballs. Nymphenburger, München 2006, ISBN 978-3-485-01074-0.
- Wortwechsel. Frauenoffensive, München 2006, ISBN 3-88104-375-6.
- Beschützt, bewahrt, geborgen: Wie magischer Schutz wirklich funktioniert. Nymphenburger, München 2007, ISBN 978-3-485-01104-4.
- Kubabas Granatapfel: Meine Reise zur Heilung. Nymphenburger, München 2008, ISBN 978-3-485-01131-0.
- Hundstage. Krokodilstränen: Leben mit dem Klimawandel. Frauenoffensive, München 2008, ISBN 978-3-88104-380-9.
- Weidenfrau und Wiesenkönigin: Magie und Heilwissen aus der Natur. Nymphenburger, München 2009, ISBN 978-3-485-01169-3.
- Die Göttin im Federkleid. Das weibliche Universum bei Kelten und Germanen. Nymphenburger, München 2010.
- Die Schatzhüterin: Klassische Märchen neu erzählt. Nymphenburger, München 2011, ISBN 978-3-485-01357-4.
- Der magische Alltag: Rituale und Zauberrezepte. Nymphenburger, München 2011, ISBN 978-3-485-01340-6.
- Frauenkraft, Frauenweisheit: Mit Freude den eigenen Weg gehen. Nymphenburger, München 2014, ISBN 978-3-485-02809-7.
- Schutzrituale. Wirksame Hilfe für den Alltag. Nymphenburger, München 2014.
- Tiere als magische Helferwesen: tanzende Katzen, singende Hunde, sprechende Pferde. Mit 25 Zeichnungen von Luisa Francia, Nymphenburger, München 2015, ISBN 978-3-485-02837-0.
- Wer nicht alt werden will, muss vorher sterben. Nachdenken über die letzte Lebenszeit. Nymphenburger, München 2016.
- Im Körper zu Hause: Heilung suchen, Heilung finden. Nymphenburger, München 2017, ISBN 978-3-485-02935-3.
- Mit Göttinnen durch die Raunächte 12 Anleitungen zur Befreiung des Herzens. Knaur MensSana HC 2021, ISBN 978-3-426-65875-8.
