= Jutta Lampe =

German actress (1937–2020)

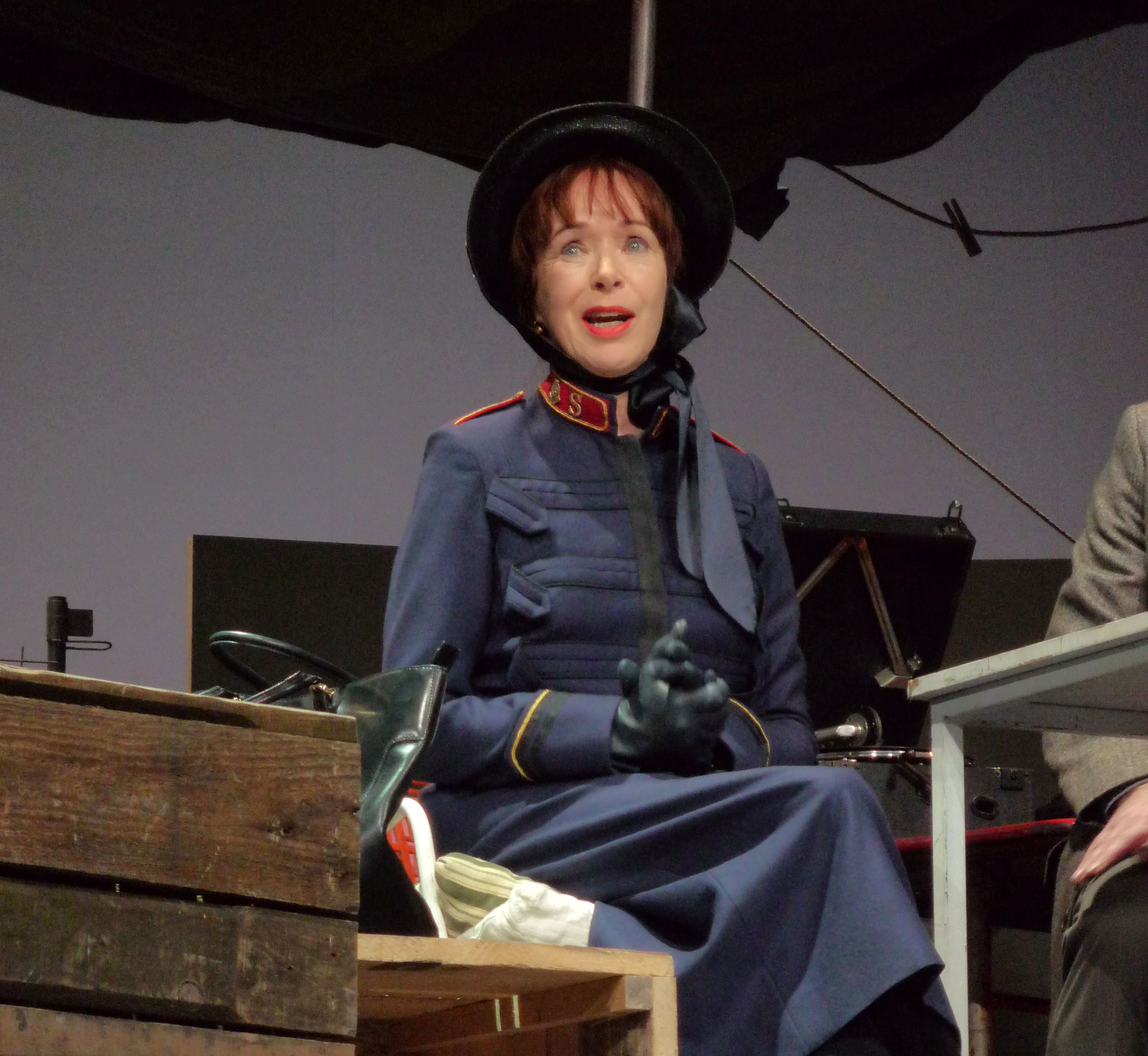
- Lampe in 2009 in Shaw's Major Barbara
- Born: 13 December 1937; Flensburg, Schleswig-Holstein, Germany
- Died: 3 December 2020 (aged 82); Berlin, Germany
- Occupation: Actress
- Organizations: Theater Bremen; Schaubühne; Burgtheater; Schauspielhaus Zürich
- Awards: Actress of the Year; Pour le Mérite; Order of Merit of the Federal Republic of Germany; Gertrud-Eysoldt-Ring; Joana Maria Gorvin Prize

Jutta Lampe (13 December 1937 – 3 December 2020) was a German actress on stage and in film. She was for 30 years a leading actress at the Schaubühne founded in Berlin by her husband Peter Stein, where she played both classical theatre such as Alkmene in Kleist's Amphitryon, and world premieres including Robert Wilson's Orlando for one actor, and roles that Botho Strauß created for her. She was also engaged at the Vienna Burgtheater and the Schauspielhaus Zürich. She appeared in more than twenty films from 1963, including lead roles in films by Margarethe von Trotta. Lampe was named Actress of the Year by Theater heute several times. Other awards included the Gertrud-Eysoldt-Ring and the Joana Maria Gorvin Prize for her life's work.

== Life and career ==
Born in Flensburg, Lampe appeared on stage first at age eight in ballet. She was trained for acting by Eduard Marks in Hamburg in 1956. She had her first engagement at the Staatstheater Wiesbaden, followed by the Nationaltheater Mannheim. In the 1960s, she was successful at Theater Bremen where she worked with directors including Peter Zadek and Peter Stein. She played Lady Milford in Schiller's Kabale und Liebe directed by Stein, alongside Bruno Ganz and Edith Clever. She appeared in Shakespeare's (Maß für Maß) Measure for Measure directed by Zadek, and the Princess in Goethe's Torquato Tasso directed by Stein.

When Stein founded the Schaubühne in Berlin in 1970, she was one of the first leading women in the ensemble, but always regarding herself as part of the team. She worked there for 30 years. She played Athene in Stein's production of the Orestie by Aischylos. In Klaus Michael Grüber's staging of Shakespeare's Hamlet in 1982, she played Ophelia "as if in a trance". In his production of Kleist's Amphitryon in 1991, she was Alkmene. She performed in several plays by Botho Strauß, directed by Luc Bondy. Strauss had seen her in Wiesbaden at the beginning of her career. With director Robert Wilson, she worked for the premiere of his play Orlando, which he based on the novel by Virginia Woolf. As the play's only actor, she played many roles, changing gender and period on a time voyage.

From 2001 to 2002, Lampe was a member of the Burgtheater in Vienna. She played there Arkadina in Chekhov's Die Möwe, directed by Bondy, alongside Gert Voss in a production also shown at the Berliner Theatertreffen. Directed by Edith Clever, she played Winnie in Beckett's Glückliche Tage, with irony and sarcasm. She performed in Berlin once more in 2005, with Clever in a play for two women, Die eine und die andere, which Botho Strauß dedicated to them, staged by Bondy. From 2005 to 2008 she was engaged at the Schauspielhaus Zürich. One of her last roles on stage was there in 2009, in Shaw's Major Barbara which was also Zadek's last premiere.

She was married to Peter Stein from 1967 to 1984. Jutta Lampe died in Berlin on 3 December 2020, ten days before her 83rd birthday, after a long struggle with dementia.

=== Theatre ===
- Theater Bremen
  - Lady Milford in Schiller's Kabale und Liebe, 1967
  - Leonore in Goethe's Torquato Tasso, 1968
  - Elisabeth in Schiller's Don Carlos, 1969
- Schaubühne Berlin
  - Solveig in Ibsen's Peer Gynt, 1971
  - Marianne in Horváth's Geschichten aus dem Wienerwald, 1972
  - Physician in Gorki's Die Sommergäste, 1974
  - Charlotte Sonntag in Else Lasker-Schüler's Die Wupper, 1976
  - Athene in Orestie by Aischylos, 1982
  - K. in Kalldewey by Botho Strauß, 1983
  - Mascha in Chekhov's Drei Schwestern, 1984
  - Ranevskaja in Chekhov's Der Kirschgarten, 1989
  - Title role in Robert Wilson's Orlando after Virginia Woolf's novel, premiere, 1989
  - Alkmene in Kleist's Amphitryon, 1991
  - Madame de Montreuil in Mishima's Madame de Sade, 1996
  - Rosie Büdesheimer in Rudolf Borchardt's Der Hausbesuch, 1997
  - Title role in Racine's Andromache, 2004
  - Lissie in Die eine und die andere by Botho Strauß, 2005
- Salzburg Festival
  - Lilly Groth in Das Gleichgewicht by Botho Strauß, 1993
  - Ilse in Luigi Pirandello's Die Riesen vom Berge, 1994
- Vienna
  - Agathe / Ellen Seegast in Die Ähnlichen by Botho Strauß, Theater in der Josefstadt, 1998
  - Arkadina in Chekhov's Die Möwe, Wiener Festwochen in co-production with the Burgtheater, 2000
  - Winnie in Beckett's Glückliche Tage, Burgtheater in co-production with the Berliner Ensemble, 2002
- Schauspielhaus Zürich
  - Ella in Ibsen's John Gabriel Borkman, 2005
  - Amanda in Die Glasmenagerie by Tennessee Williams, 2007
  - Mrs. Baines in Shaw's Major Barbara, 2009

=== Films ===
Lampe appeared in films by Margarethe von Trotta, beginning in 1979 in Schwestern oder Die Balance des Glücks (Sisters, or the Balance of Happiness), then in 1981 in Die bleierne Zeit alongside Barbara Sukowa, and decades later in Rosenstraße.

| Year | Title | Role | Director |
|---|---|---|---|
| 1976 | Sommergäste; Summerfolk | Marija Lvovna | Peter Stein |
| 1979 | Schwestern oder Die Balance des Glücks; Sisters, or the Balance of Happiness | Maria Sundermann | Margarethe von Trotta |
| 1981 | Die bleierne Zeit; Marianne and Juliane | Juliane | Margarethe von Trotta |
| 1987 | Das weite Land; The Distant Land | Anna Meinhold-Aigner | Luc Bondy |
| 1988 | The Possessed | Maria Lebjadkin | Andrzej Wajda |
| 2003 | Rosenstraße | Ruth Weinstein (at age 60) | Margarethe von Trotta |

== Awards ==
Lampe's awards included:

- 1982: Deutscher Darstellerpreis
- 1988: Actress of the Year, by Theater heute
- 1990: Actress of the Year
- 1992: Theaterpreis Berlin, by Stiftung Preußische Seehandlung
- 1998: Order Pour le Mérite für Wissenschaften und Künste
- 1999: Knight Commander's Cross of the Order of Merit of the Federal Republic of Germany
- 1998: Gertrud-Eysoldt-Ring
- 2000: Actress of the Year
- 2004: Stanislawski-Prize of the Moscow Theater Institute
- 2010: Joana Maria Gorvin Prize
