= Pamela Katz =

American screenwriter and novelist (born 1958)

- Born: 16 April 1958 (age 68); Rhinebeck, New York, US
- Occupations: Screenwriter; novelist; director
- Years active: 1987–present
- Spouse: Florian Ballhaus
- Website: pkatz.com

Pamela Katz (born April 16, 1958) is an American screenwriter and novelist best known for her collaborations with director Margarethe von Trotta, including Rosenstrasse and Hannah Arendt.

She is currently a teacher of screenwriting at the Tisch School of the Arts.

== Early life ==
Katz was born on April 16, 1958, in Rhinebeck, New York, to psychoanalyst Natalie Becker and philosophy professor Joseph Katz, who had moved to the United States in 1940 from Leipzig, Germany. In 1980 she received her Bachelor's of Arts agree from Dartmouth College in Hanover, New Hampshire. Though she majored in anthropology, upon graduating she began working in the film world in various technical capacities. This included working with directors such as Martin Scorsese, Mike Nichols and Spike Lee.

== Film career ==
The trajectory of Katz's film career has been marked by her fascinations with historical biography with special attention to the cultural context and ramifications of the holocaust. She began her career as a filmmaker with her debut short In a Jazz Way, a thirty minute film co-directed with Louise Ghertler about dance documentarian Mura Dehn. The film was perceived as unusual for its avoidance of typical documentary tropes and its usage of conversation to convey a sense of Dehn's legacy.

Her breakthrough film Rosenstrasse was co-written with director Margarethe von Trotta and came out in 2003. The film centered around the Rosenstrasse protest which occurred in Berlin in 1943. It was concerned with the concept of the good German during the Nazi era, and though von Trotta insisted it was not intended to "rehabilitate the German," it was criticized by James Adams at the Globe & Mail for being "insufficiently emotionally complex."

When asked about her longtime collaboration with von Trotta, Katz said in a 2004 interview with FF2 Media's Jan Lisa Huttner that:

In the course of working with Margarethe, I discovered that Germans artists feel they have to be very careful about how they present Jews. Even a radical, left-wing, politically-perfect woman like Margarethe von Trotta is going to feel nervous about how she presents a Jewish family.... But then I came on board, and I said: “I feel very Jewish and I come from a family that identifies itself as Jewish. But we don’t keep kosher, etc, etc.” That was hard for Margarethe to hear, and it took quite a bit of nerve on her part. A big part of our tension, the creative back and forth between us, came about because I kept saying: “You can do it any way you want to.”

Remembrance (2011) is a love story Katz wrote for director Anna Justice which begins with a Polish prisoner (Tomasz) rescuing his Jewish girlfriend (Hannah) from Auschwitz in 1944. After losing each other and becoming convinced that the other is dead, thirty years pass before Hannah sights Tomasz during an interview and the two reconnect. Though the idea was criticized as being unrealistic, Katz said in an interview with Susana Styron that "there [were] actually 600 attempted escapes from Auschwitz, about a third of which were actually successful."

Hannah Arendt (2012), was co-written with director Margarethe von Trotta and was a biographical film depicting a portion of the life of Jewish intellectual Hannah Arendt. The film specifically deals with Arendt's coverage of the trial of Nazi Lieutenant Colonel Adolf Eichmann and the subsequent controversy in academic circles.

== Other work ==
Outside of film work Katz has a career as a teacher of screenwriting at NYU Tisch School of the Arts as well as a novelist. She has written a historical novel entitled And Speaking of Love which was based on the life of Lotte Lenya.

In 2015, Random House released Katz's book The Partnership: Brecht, Weill, Three Women, and Germany on the Brink, a non-fiction account of the theatrical artists Bertolt Brecht and Kurt Weill's collaboration and subsequent alienation. It covers the years of their friendship while exploring the relationships they had with actresses Lotte Lenya and Helene Weigel as well as the writer Elisabeth Hauptmann.

== Personal life ==
On February 7, 1988, Katz married German cinematographer Florian Ballhaus.

== Filmography ==
Year	Title	Credit	Notes
1987	In a Jazz Way: A Portrait of Mura Dehn	Director	
1989	Caro Nome	Writer, Director	as Pam Katz
1994	Alles auf Anfang	Story	
1998	Two Women, Two Men	Writer	
2000	Scheidung auf Rädern (TV Movie)	Writer	
2003	Rosenstrasse	Writer	with Margarethe von Trotta
2004	The Other Woman (TV Movie)	Writer	with Margarethe von Trotta
2011	Remembrance	Screenplay	as Pam Katz
2012	Hannah Arendt	Screenplay	with Margarethe von Trotta
2017	Forget About Nick	Screenplay	with Margarethe von Trotta
