= Doris Schade =

German actress (1924–2012)

- Born: Doris Schade; 21 May 1924; Bad Frankenhausen, Germany
- Died: 25 June 2012 (aged 88); Munich, Germany
- Height: 1,66m

Doris Schade (21 May 1924 – 25 June 2012) was a German stage, radio, and film actress. She was born in Bad Frankenhausen, Germany.

== Filmography ==
Year	Title	Role	Notes
1970	Piggies	Minni	
1979	Derrick	Martha Kerk	Season 6, Episode 2: "Anschlag auf Bruno"
1981	Marianne and Juliane	The mother	
1982	Veronika Voss	Josefa	
1982	Derrick	Frau Dettmers	Season 9, Episode 7: "Hausmusik"
1983	Sheer Madness		
1984	Fear of Falling		
1986	Rosa Luxemburg	Clara Zetkin	
1993	Just a Matter of Duty	Psychiaterin	
1996	Beyond Silence	Lilli	
1999	Nichts als die Wahrheit	Hilde Rohm	
2003	Rosenstrasse	Lena Fischer - age 90	
2006	Wild Chicks	Oma Slättberg	
2007	Wild Chicks in Love	Oma Slättberg	
2009	The Wild Chicks and Life	Oma Slättberg	
