= Pierre Deny =

French actor (1956–2026)

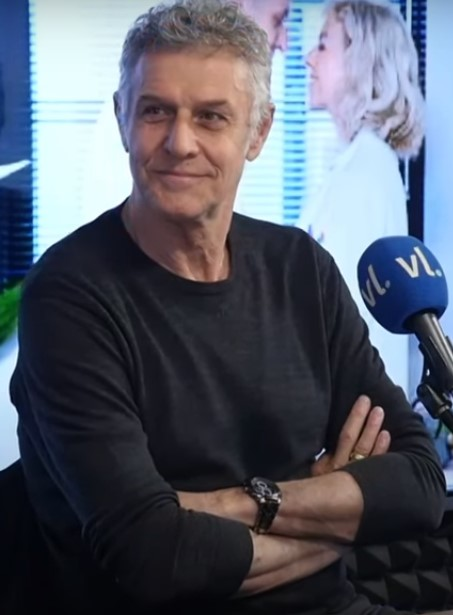
- Deny in 2023
- Born: 12 July 1956; France
- Died: 25 May 2026 (aged 69)
- Education: Institut national supérieur des arts du spectacle et des techniques de diffusion
- Occupation: Actor

Pierre Deny (French: [pjˈɛʁ dɪnˈa͡ɪ]; 12 July 1956 – 25 May 2026) was a French actor.

A graduate of the Institut national supérieur des arts du spectacle et des techniques de diffusion, he performed in the theatre before working under film directors such as Andrzej Wajda, Margarethe von Trotta, José Pinheiro, and Sylvie Testud.

Deny died of ALS on 25 May 2026, at the age of 69.

== Filmography ==
=== Film ===
- The African Woman (1990)
- The Role of Her Life (2004)
- Another Woman's Life (2012)

=== Telefilms ===
- Times Have Been Better (2006)

=== Television series ===
- Médecins de nuit (1986)
- Julie Lescaut (1995)
- Jamais deux sans toi...t (1997)
- Les vacances de l'amour (1998)
- Sous le soleil (1998)
- Josephine, Guardian Angel (1999)
- Section de recherches (2011)
- Plus belle la vie (2013)
- Profilage (2016)
- Tomorrow Is Ours (2017–2024)
- La Mante (2017)
- Emily in Paris (2022, 2024)
