= Anderson Bigode Herzer =

Brazilian transgender writer (1962–1982)

- The cover of Herzer's poetry collection A queda para o alto
- Born: 10 June 1962; Rolândia, Paraná, Brazil
- Died: 10 August 1982 (aged 20); São Paulo, São Paulo, Brazil
- Writing career
- Genre: Poetry

Anderson Bigode Herzer (10 June 1962 in Rolândia, Paraná, Brazil – 10 August 1982, in São Paulo, São Paulo, Brazil) was a writer and poet. He died by suicide at the age of 20. The film Vera by Sérgio Toledo is based on Herzer's life.

== Life and times ==
Herzer was a transsexual man, ex-intern of the Fundação Estadual para o Bem Estar do Menor (FEBEM; a State institution for the protection of minors) whose life and verses were published in a book titled A queda para o alto, translated as 'descending upwards' in English. This book, in turn, served as the basis for the Brazilian film production Vera, directed by Sérgio Toledo Segall. He was four years old when his father was killed, and his mother, a prostitute at that time, felt unable to take care of him, therefore turning young Herzer in to FEBEM. Sometime soon after that, his mother died.

Poster for Vera

Although Herzer considered himself to be a lesbian for some time in his life, he then identified as transsexual. His school records show that he was a problem student, often engaging in fights, using street drugs and consuming alcohol.

Herzer was institutionalized in FEBEM when he was fourteen years old. At that time he adopted the name Anderson Bigode Herzer (Anderson being a common male first name in Brazil; although bigode is an unusual nickname, meaning mustache). He remained under the State's tutelage until seventeen years of age. At that time Eduardo Suplicy, a renowned member of parliament (deputado in Portuguese), touched by his poems and difficult life, acted as his protégé and hired him as an intern in his office.

== Death ==
In spite of the support received, Herzer felt profoundly traumatized and decided to die by suicide by jumping off the Viaduto 23 de Maio, a viaduct located in the downtown area of São Paulo.

== See also ==
- Rosely Roth
