= Barbara Sukowa =

German actress and singer

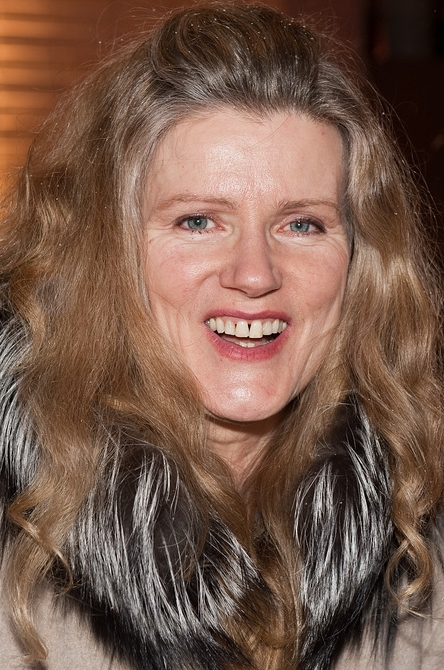
- Sukowa in 2010
- Born: 2 February 1950 (age 76); Bremen, West Germany
- Occupations: Actress, singer
- Years active: 1971–
- Spouse(s): Hans-Michael Rehberg Robert Longo (m. 1993)
- Partner: Daniel Olbrychski
- Children: 3

Barbara Sukowa (German: [ˈbaʁbaʁa ˈzuːkɔva]; born 2 February 1950) is a German actress of screen and stage and singer. She has received three German Film Awards for Best Actress, three Bavarian Film Awards, Cannes Film Festival Award for Best Actress, Venice Film Festival Award, as well as nominations for European Film Awards, César Awards, and Grammy Awards.

Sukowa is best known for her work with directors Rainer Werner Fassbinder and Margarethe von Trotta. She rose to prominence after starring in the West German miniseries Berlin Alexanderplatz directed by Fassbinder, and the following year went to star in his drama film Lola, for which she received her first German Film Award for Best Actress. Also in 1981, Sukowa starred in Marianne and Juliane directed by Margarethe von Trotta. They would go on to work on six more films together. For her performance, she also received German Film Award and Venice Film Festival Award for Best Actress. In 1986, she won the Cannes Film Festival Award for Best Actress for performance in the drama film Rosa Luxemburg.

In 1990s, Sukowa starred in a number of international films, most notable, Europa (1991) directed by Lars von Trier, Voyager (1991) by Volker Schlöndorff, M. Butterfly by David Cronenberg, and Johnny Mnemonic (1995) by Robert Longo. In later career, she played Hildegard of Bingen in 2009 drama film Vision, and Hannah Arendt in the biographical film Hannah Arendt (2012). She starred in the American television series 12 Monkeys (2015–2018), a remake of the 1995 film of the same name. In 2019, she starred in French drama film Two of Us, for which she received Lumière Award for Best Actress and César Award for Best Actress nomination.

== Life and career ==
Sukowa was born in Bremen, Germany, in 1950. She speaks German, English, and French. After studying acting at the Max Reinhardt Seminar in Vienna, Sukowa's stage debut was in Berlin in 1971, in a production of Peter Handke's Der Ritt über den Bodensee. The same year, Günter Beelitz invited her to join the ensemble of the Darmstädter National Theatre. She also worked in Frankfurt am Main and Hamburg, in collaboration with directors such as Luc Bondy, playing Marion in Büchner's Danton's Death and Helena in A Midsummer Night's Dream. Other Shakespeare roles in Europe were Rosalind in As You Like It and Desdemona in Othello. She performed in Ibsen's The Master Builder.

In addition to her stage work, Sukowa is associated with the New German Cinema. Her performance as Mieze in Rainer Werner Fassbinder's miniseries Berlin Alexanderplatz (1980) earned her the German Best Young Actress Award. The following year, her performance of the title role in Fassbinder's drama film Lola earned her a German Film Award for Best Actress. Also that year, she starred in Marianne and Juliane directed by Margarethe von Trotta. For this performance she also received German Film Award for Best Actress and Venice Film Festival Golden Phoenix Award for Best Actress. She starred in Die Jäger (1982) directed by Károly Makk, Un dimanche de flic (1983) by Michel Vianey, and Équateur by Serge Gainsbourg. In 1985, Sukowa made her American television debut starring in the CBS miniseries Space, based on James A. Michener's novel.

In 1986, Sukowa played Polish socialist Rosa Luxemburg in the biographical drama film Rosa Luxemburg directed by Margarethe von Trotta. She received Cannes Film Festival Award for Best Actress for her performance, and well as another German Film Award for Best Actress. In 1987, she starred in Days to Remember directed by Jeanine Meerapfel, receiving nomination for a German Film Award for Best Actress, and appeared in American action film The Sicilian opposite Christopher Lambert. In 1990, she starred in The African Woman directed by Margarethe von Trotta.

Sukowa moved to Brooklyn, New York City in 1991. In 1991, she starred opposite Sam Shepard in Voyager directed by Volker Schlöndorff, and Europa by Lars von Trier. Both films received positive reviews from critics. Sukowa was nominated for European Film Award for Best Supporting Actress for Voyager, and European Film Award for Best European Actress of the Year for Europa. In 1993, she starred in M. Butterfly directed by David Cronenberg. In 1995, she appeared in Johnny Mnemonic directed by Robert Longo. In 1997, she returned in Germany for starring in In the Name of Innocence, for which she received Bavarian Film Award for Best Actress In 1999, she appeared in Tim Robbins's Cradle Will Rock, and The Third Miracle directed by Agnieszka Holland. Sukowa also starred in a made-for-television films Lost Souls (1998) and The Lady in Question (1999).

Sukowa has developed a parallel career as a classical music narrator and speaker. She has performed the Speaker's role in Arnold Schoenberg's Pierrot lunaire, first with the Schoenberg Ensemble under Reinbert de Leeuw, and later with ensembles in Paris, London, Berlin, St. Petersburg, Madrid, Rome, Tokyo, Salzburg, Los Angeles, and New York City. She has performed the Speaker's role in Schoenberg's Gurrelieder with the Berlin Philharmonic under Claudio Abbado, and is featured on the recordings with Abbado and the Vienna Philharmonic, and Esa-Pekka Salonen and the Philharmonia. She narrated Prokofiev's Peter and the Wolf both in concert and on record, as well as on a recording of Mendelssohn's music for A Midsummer Night's Dream. In English, she has worked in a production of The Cherry Orchard (Princeton, New Jersey, 2000). Sukowa has performed in Arthur Honegger's Jeanne d'Arc au bûcher and Kurt Weill's The Threepenny Opera. She performed speaking and singing roles in de Leeuw's Im wunderschönen Monat Mai in 2004. She performed the speaking role in the US premiere of Michael Jarrell's Cassandre in March 2006, and in the New York City premiere that month, with musicians from the Saint Louis Symphony Orchestra. At the 51st Annual Grammy Awards, she received Grammy Award nomination for Im wunderschönen Monat Mai. Sukowa is also the front singer of the Band the X-Patsys, which she founded with visual artists Jon Kessler and Robert Longo.

In 2004, Sukowa was a member of the jury at the 26th Moscow International Film Festival. In 2012, she was on the jury for the 62nd Berlin International Film Festival.

In 2009, Sukowa played the role of Hildegard of Bingen in 2009 drama film Vision directed by Margarethe von Trotta, receiving another Bavarian Film Award for Best Actress. In 2012, Sukowa starred as German-Jewish philosopher and political theorist Hannah Arendt in the German-Luxembourgish-French biographical film Hannah Arendt directed by Margarethe von Trotta. The film and her performance received positive reviews from critics. Sukowa received another Bavarian Film Award for Best Actress and German Film Award for Best Performance by an Actress in a Leading Role, and well as European Film Award for Best Actress nomination. In 2016, she appeared on Maria Schrader' drama film Stefan Zweig: Farewell to Europe, and later had supporting roles in Atomic Blonde (2017), Gloria Bell (2018), and Native Son (2019).

From 2015 to 2018, Sukowa starred as Katarina Jones in the American television series 12 Monkeys. She continued appearing on American television guest-starring on Hunters starring Al Pacino, and had a recurring role on the Apple TV+ series Servant. In 2022, she was cast in the thriller The Swarm based on the Frank Schätzing best-seller.

In 2019, Sukowa starred in French romance drama film Two of Us, for which she received Lumière Award for Best Actress and César Award for Best Actress nomination.

In 2022, Sukowa starred opposite Ben Kingsley in the biographical film Dalíland about Salvador Dalí, playing Gala Dalí. It premiered at the 2022 Toronto International Film Festival.

== Personal life ==
She was married to the artist and director Robert Longo, with whom she has performed as a singer. She has three sons, one from her earlier marriage to Hans-Michael Rehberg, one from her relationship with Daniel Olbrychski, and one with Longo. She and Longo separated in 2018.

== Filmography ==
=== Film ===
Year	Title	Role	Notes
1981	Lola	Lola	German Film Award for Best Performance by an Actress in a Leading Role; Munich International Film Festival Award for Best Actress
1981	Marianne and Juliane	Marianne	German Film Award for Best Performance by an Actress in a Leading Role; Venice Film Festival Golden Phoenix Award for Best Actress
1982	Die Jäger	Daniela Mathiesen	
1983	Un dimanche de flic	Patricia	
1983	Équateur	Adele	
1986	Rosa Luxemburg	Rosa Luxemburg	Cannes Film Festival Award for Best Actress; German Film Award for Best Performance by an Actress in a Leading Role
1987	Days to Remember	Katharina	Nominated - German Film Award for Best Performance by an Actress in a Leading Role
1987	The Sicilian	Camilla, Duchess of Crotone	
1990	The African Woman	Martha	
1991	Voyager	Hannah	Nominated - European Film Award for Best Supporting Actress
1991	Europa	Katharina Hartmann	Nominated - European Film Award for Best European Actress of the Year
1993	M. Butterfly	Jeanne Gallimard	
1995	Johnny Mnemonic	Anna Kalmann	
1997	Office Killer	Virginia Wingate	
1997	In the Name of Innocence	Anna Loeser	Bavarian Film Award for Best Actress
1999	Cradle Will Rock	Sophie Silvano	
1999	The Third Miracle	Helen	
1999	Star! Star!	Marianne	
2000	Urbania	Clara - The Married Woman	
2001	Thirteen Conversations About One Thing	Helen	Florida Film Critics Circle Award for Best Cast
2003	Hierankl	Rosemarie	Adolf Grimme Award in Gold
2005	Romance & Cigarettes	Gracie	
2008	The Invention of Curried Sausage	Lena Brücker	Montreal World Film Festival Award for Best Actress
2009	Veronika Decides to Die	Mrs. Deklava	
2009	Vision	Hildegard of Bingen	Bavarian Film Award for Best Actress
2012	Hannah Arendt	Hannah Arendt	Bavarian Film Award for Best Actress; German Film Award for Best Performance by an Actress in a Leading Role; Nominated - European Film Award for Best Actress; Nominated - Chlotrudis Award for Best Actress; Nominated - German Film Critics Association Award for Best Actress; Nominated - Romy Gala, Austria Award for Best Actress; Nominated - Women Film Critics Circle Award for Best Actress
2013	El cielo es azul	Marquez	
2015	Die abhandene Welt	Caterina Fabiani/Evelyn Kromberger	
2016	Stefan Zweig: Farewell to Europe	Friderike Zweig	Nominated - German Film Award for Best Performance by an Actress in a Supporting Role
2016	My Art		
2017	Atomic Blonde	Coroner	
2018	Gloria Bell	Melinda	
2019	Native Son	Peggy	
2019	Rocca verändert die Welt	Dodo	
2019	Two of Us	Nina Dorn	Lumière Award for Best Actress; Dublin Film Critics Award for Best Actress; Nominated - César Award for Best Actress; Nominated - International Cinephile Society Award for Best Actress; Nominated - Women Film Critics Circle Award for Best Screen Couple
2020	Granny Nanny	Philippa	
2022	White Noise	Sister Hermann Marie	
2022	Dalíland	Gala Dalí	
2023	Air	Kathy Dassler	
2023	Enkel für Fortgeschrittene	Philippa	
2024	Klandestin WT	Mathilda	
2026	Eurotrash	Helene	

=== Television ===
Year	Title	Role	Notes
1974	Unter Ausschluß der Öffentlichkeit	Viktoria Herbst	Episode: "Der Abstieg"
1977	Women in New York	Crystal Allen	Television film
1978	Heinrich Heine	Amalie Friedländer	Television film
1980	Berlin Alexanderplatz	Emilie "Mieze" Karsunke	Miniseries
1980	Tatort	Babsi Meyer	Episode: "Der gelbe Unterrock"
1980	St. Pauli-Landungsbrücken		Episode: "Immer lustig"
1984	Baumeister Solness	Hilde Wangel	Television film
1985	Space	Leisel Kolff	Miniseries
1993	Colpo di coda	Regina	Television film
1995	The Wright Verdicts	Sister Maria Pulaski	Episode: "The Eyes of God"
1998	New York Undercover	Cousal General	Episode: "Pipeline"
1998	Lost Souls	Sheila Robinson	Television film
1999	The Lady in Question	Rachel Singer	Television film
2002–2003	Liebe, Lügen, Leidenschaften	Barbara Landau	Miniseries
2004	The Other Woman	Vera Glaubitz	Television film
2011	Night Without Morning	Katharina Dänert	Television film
2015–2018	12 Monkeys	Katarina Jones	Series regular, 45 episodes
2020	Hunters	Tilda Sauer	Episode: "At Night, All Birds Are Black"
2021–2022	Servant	Aunt Josephine	Recurring role
2023	The Swarm	Dr. Katherina Lehmann	Series regular, 8 episodes
2024	Constellation	Irena Lysenko	Limited series
2025	The Night Agent	Jacqueline Laurent	Episode: "A Good Agent"

General source for Awards and nomination - AllMovie
