= The Second Awakening of Christa Klages =

- Theatrical release poster
- Directed by: Margarethe von Trotta
- Written by: Margarethe von Trotta; Luisa Francia
- Produced by: Eberhard Junkersdorf; Gunther Witte
- Cinematography: Franz Rath
- Edited by: Annette Dorn; Marie-Luise Bauer
- Music by: Klaus Doldinger
- Production companies: Bioskop Film GmbH; Westdeutscher Rundfunk
- Distributed by: Filmverlag der Autoren GmbH; Co. Vertriebs KG
- Release date: 24 February 1978 (Berlin International Film Festival)
- Running time: 89 minutes
- Country: West Germany
- Language: German

The Second Awakening of Christa Klages (German: Das zweite Erwachen der Christa Klages) is a 1978 West German drama film directed by Margarethe von Trotta, her debut solo film.

== Plot ==
Worried about the prospects of her children's day care center and running out of money, Christa Klages, a young mother, robs a bank with the help of her lover Werner Wiedemann and another friend. However, Werner is killed during the heist and it becomes clear that the police are after her. Christa flees to Portugal to seek help from another friend, Ingrid Häkele, creating a situation that threatens both women's safety.

== Cast ==
- Tina Engel as Christa Klages
- Silvia Reize as Ingrid Häkele
- Katharina Thalbach as Lena Seidlhofer
- Marius Müller-Westernhagen as Werner Wiedemann
- Peter Schneider as Hans Grawe
- Ulrich von Dobschütz as Heinz Häkele
- Erika Wackernagel as Hans' Mother
- Friedrich Kaiser as Wolfgang
- Achim Krausz as Bank Director
- Fritz Ley as Old Man
- Gertrud Thomele as Christa's Mother
- Rosa Sämmer as Janitress
- Margit Czenki as Kindergarten Teacher Reingard
- Peter Koj as Erich Grawe
- Hildegard Linden as Woman
- Ingrid Kraus as Lena's Colleague
- Natascha Steuer as Mischa Klages
- Josef Bierbichler as Homeowner
- Luisa Francia as Christa's Friend
- Felix Moeller as Boy
- Helga Kirchlechner
- Bruno Thost
- Karl Tischlinger

== Release ==
The film was released on DVD by Water Bearer Films in 2005 as part of a box set together with Sisters, or the Balance of Happiness and Sheer Madness.

== Reception ==
Critical reception has been overwhelmingly positive. The film was nominated for the best feature award (Gold Hugo) at the 1978 Chicago International Film Festival and has won the following awards, all in 1978: Otto-Dibelius-Preis, Deutscher Filmpreis (Filmband in Gold for acting as well as Filmband in Silber) and FBW (Deutsche Film- und Medienbewertung for high overall quality). It was called a "very earnest movie" by The New York Times critic Vincent Canby, an "acutely observed reflection" by Scott Tobias, and "compelling" by London's Time Out. A few reviews, however, were more negative. For example, Chicago Reader critic Dave Kehr wrote that "the film is very, very dull" and disliked what he saw as the overly serious demeanor of the characters.
