= The African Woman =

- Directed by: Margarethe von Trotta
- Written by: Margarethe von Trotta
- Produced by: Augusto Caminito; Eberhard Junkersdorf
- Starring: Stefania Sandrelli; Barbara Sukowa; Sami Frey
- Cinematography: Tonino Delli Colli
- Edited by: Nino Baragli
- Music by: Eleni Karaindrou
- Release date: 1990
- Countries: West Germany; Italy; France
- Language: German

The African Woman (German: Die Rückkehr, Italian: L'africana, also known as The Woman from Africa) is a 1990 West German-Italian-French drama film directed by Margarethe von Trotta. It was entered into the main competition at the 47th Venice International Film Festival.

== Premises ==
"The long friendship between Martha and Anna breaks when Victor leaves the first for the second. Martha, desperate, goes to Africa in search of an old love."

== Cast ==
- Stefania Sandrelli as Anna
- Barbara Sukowa as Martha
- Sami Frey as Victor
- Jan Biczycki as Swinarski (as Jan Paul Biczycki)
- Alexandre Mnouchkine as Andrej
- Jacques Sernas as Dr. Wargnier
- Kadidia Diarra as Kind
- Pierre Deny as Journalist
- Bernard Tachl as Hausmeister
