= Vision (2009 film) =

Vision - From the Life of Hildegard von Bingen
- Theatrical release poster
- Directed by: Margarethe von Trotta
- Written by: Margarethe von Trotta
- Produced by: Markus Zimmer
- Starring: Barbara Sukowa; Heino Ferch; Hannah Herzsprung
- Cinematography: Axel Block
- Edited by: Corina Dietz
- Music by: Chris Heyne; Hildegard von Bingen
- Distributed by: Zeitgeist Films
- Release dates: 4 September 2009 (Telluride); 24 September 2009 (Germany)
- Running time: 111 minutes
- Country: Germany
- Languages: German; English

Vision (German: Vision - Aus dem Leben der Hildegard von Bingen; English: Vision – From the Life of Hildegard von Bingen) is a 2009 German film directed by Margarethe von Trotta.

== Plot ==
In Vision, New German Cinema auteur Margarethe von Trotta (Marianne and Julianne, Rosa Luxemburg and Rosentrasse) tells the story of Hildegard of Bingen, the famed 12th century Benedictine nun, Christian mystic, composer, philosopher, playwright, physician, poet, naturalist, scientist and ecological activist. Hildegard was a multi-talented, highly intelligent woman who had to work within the narrow social roles allowed for women at the time.

== Cast ==
- Barbara Sukowa as Hildegard of Bingen
  - Stella Holzapfel as Hildegard as a Child
- Heino Ferch as Brother Volmar
- Hannah Herzsprung as Sister Richardis
- Mareile Blendi as Countess Jutta von Sponheim
- Sunnyi Melles as Marchioness Richardis von Stade
- Alexander Held as Abbot Kuno
- Lena Stolze as Sister Jutta
- Paula Kalenberg as Sister Clara
- Annemarie Düringer as Abbess Tengwich
- Devid Striesow as Emperor Frederick Barbarossa

== Production ==
Integrally involved with the 1970s Women’s Movement, filmmaker Margarethe von Trotta has always been drawn to women whose story has been marginalized over time. Von Trotta and others re-found Hildegard von Bingen in their search for historically forgotten (or misremembered) women. While writing the screenplay for her 1983 film Rosa Luxemburg, von Trotta’s interest in Hildegard re-emerged and she wondered whether Hildegard’s life would be good material for a movie. After writing a few scenes, von Trotta felt the film had a powerful message and potential resonance but didn’t feel she could find a producer ready to make the movie. Thus, von Trotta shelved the idea until it came to cinematic fruition recently.

The film reunites von Trotta with Barbara Sukowa (Zentropa, Berlin Alexanderplatz). Sukowa portrays Hildegard’s fierce determination to expand the responsibilities of women within the Benedictine order, as she fends off outrage from the Church over the visions she claims to receive from God. Shot in the original medieval cloisters in the German countryside, in Vision, von Trotta and Sukowa create a portrait of a woman who has emerged from the shadows of history as a forward-thinking pioneer of faith, change and enlightenment. The film depicts Hildegard's diplomatic (sometime manipulative) skills to understand men and their vanities in order to found her own convent. It captures Hildegard’s love of happiness, mankind and their connectedness to faith.

Vision made its European debut in 2009 and is being distributed in the U.S. by Zeitgeist Films starting October 13, 2010.

== Accolades ==
- Official Selection - Telluride Film Festival 2009
- Official Selection - Toronto International Film Festival 2009
