= Searching for Ingmar Bergman =

- Directed by: Margarethe von Trotta; Felix Moeller; Bettina Böhler
- Written by: Margarethe von Trotta; Felix Moeller
- Produced by: Benjamin Seikel; Stéphane Sorlet; Guy Amon; Konstanze Speidel
- Cinematography: Börres Weiffenbach
- Edited by: Bettina Böhler
- Distributed by: Oscilloscope Laboratories
- Release date: November 2, 2018 (United States)
- Running time: 99 minutes 109 minutes
- Countries: Germany; France
- Languages: German; English; Swedish; French; Spanish

Searching for Ingmar Bergman is a 2018 German French documentary film about Ingmar Bergman. The documentary was directed by Margarethe von Trotta, Felix Moeller and Bettina Böhler.

== Participants ==
- Margarethe von Trotta
- Olivier Assayas
- Stig Björkman
- Liv Ullmann
- Daniel Bergman
- Jean-Claude Carrière
- Judith Bergman
- Ingmar Bergman Jr.
- Katinka Faragó
- Mia Hansen-Løve
- Gunnel Lindblom
- Ruben Östlund
- Carlos Saura
- Gaby Dohm
- Rita Russek
- Julia Dufvenius

== Release ==
The film was released in select U.S. theaters on November 2, 2018.

== Reception ==
The film has a 91% rating on Rotten Tomatoes based on 34 reviews. Sheila O'Malley of RogerEbert.com awarded the film two and a half stars out of four. Pat Brown of Slant Magazine also awarded the film two and a half stars out of four. Allison Gilmor of the Winnipeg Free Press awarded the film four stars out of five.

Owen Gleiberman of Variety gave the film a positive review, calling it "a documentary that bubbles over with anecdote and insight."

Todd McCarthy of The Hollywood Reporter also gave the film a positive review and wrote, "Reasonably engaging as far as it goes, Searching for Ingmar Bergman evinces great appreciation for the writer-director’s legacy and offers the testimonies of numerous eminent enthusiasts, but it leaves a good deal to be desired..."

Ben Sachs of the Chicago Reader also gave the film a positive review and wrote, "The film doesn’t provide any new information for those already familiar with Bergman’s life and work, though some of the interviewees are insightful."

Gary Goldstein of the Los Angeles Times also gave the film a positive review, calling it "a chatty and enjoyable but decidedly nondefinitive look at one of the cinema’s most acclaimed, influential auteurs..."

Robert Abele of TheWrap also gave the film a positive review and wrote, "But with so many documentaries on Bergman already in existence, that von Trotta has made her own uniquely inviting tour of his triumphs, anguishes, and longstanding themes — in essence a roomy portrait of the artist as an engaged, fallible searcher — is its own gift of sorts, from one acolyte of cinema to another."
