= Rosenstrasse (film) =

2003 film directed by Margarethe von Trotta

Rosenstraße
- Dutch theatrical release poster
- Directed by: Margarethe von Trotta
- Written by: Pamela Katz; Margarethe von Trotta
- Produced by: Henrik Meyer, Richard Schöps, Markus Zimmer
- Starring: Maria Schrader; Katja Riemann; Martin Wuttke
- Distributed by: Universal Pictures (through United International Pictures; Netherlands); Concorde Filmverleih (Germany)
- Release dates: 18 September 2003 (Germany); 2 October 2003 (Netherlands)
- Running time: 136 minutes
- Countries: Netherlands; Germany
- Languages: German; English

Rosenstraße is a 2003 Dutch-German war film directed by Margarethe von Trotta, starring Maria Schrader and Katja Riemann. It deals with the Rosenstrasse protest of 1943.

== Plot ==
In the present day, a widow mourns the death of her husband. She covers up the TV set and all the mirrors in the house.

Her grown children are baffled by this behavior, asking why their mother has suddenly become Orthodox Jewish. The mother will not discuss her past, but her daughter wants to know what happened. Learning of a woman (Lena) who "saved" her mother during the war, she goes to Germany to learn the whole story. She finds Lena, who willingly reminisces about World War II, about her situation and the mother's childhood as a Jew growing up in Nazi Germany during the war. Lena herself is a German woman whose Jewish husband was persecuted by the Nazis while the little girl (the widow mother) loses her own mother to the Nazi concentration camps. The principal focus of the film addresses what happened to those who were in a mixed marriage ("Aryan"/Jewish). Amid constant flashbacks, the film pieces together the story of the Rosenstrasse protest, where the women waited for seven days and nights outside of a Nazi jail for their Jewish husbands. The protests took place in Berlin during the winter of 1943.

== Cast ==
- Katja Riemann as Lena Fischer (33 years old)
- Doris Schade as Lena Fischer (90 years old)
- Jutta Lampe as Ruth Weinstein (60 years old)
- Svea Lohde as Ruth Weinstein (8 years old)
- Martin Feifel as Fabian Fischer
- Maria Schrader as Hannah
- Jürgen Vogel as Arthur von Eschenbach
- Martin Wuttke as Joseph Goebbels
- Rainer Strecker as Schneider
- Nina Kunzendorf as Litzy
- Peter Ender as Schupo
- Thekla Reuten as Klara Singer
- Lena Stolze as Miriam Süßmann
- Jan Decleir as Nathan Goldberg
- Jutta Wachowiakas Miss Goldberg
- Fedja van Huêt as Luis Marquez
- Carola Regnier as Rachel Rosenbauer
- Hans Peter Hallwachs as Baron von Eschenbach
- Gaby Dohm as Elsa von Eschenbach

== Production ==
Rosenstraße was Margarethe von Trotta's first film since 1995. Due to funding problems, she had to choose between retreating to academia (as some of her colleagues did) or doing more TV production work.

== Accolades ==
The film won a David at the David di Donatello Awards. Franz Rath won for Best Cinematography at the Bavarian Film Awards and the UNICEF Award at the Venice Film Festival.

Katja Riemann won Best Actress Award at the Venice International Film Festival.

== Reception ==
Rosenstraße received notable criticism from film critics and historians alike. In particular, the film's explicit claim to give an accurate account of the Rosenstraße protest has caused historians to point out not only a number of minor flaws in the logic of the film, but also some major points where Rosenstraße did not stick to the facts. Among others, historian Beate Meyer compared fact and fiction in a detailed treatment, and came to the conclusion that Rosenstraße was a projection of contemporary hopes and myths on history, resulting in a utopia. The audience would inevitably come to wonder how the holocaust could occur "if only seven days of steadfastness would have sufficed to prevent it from happening."
