= Jeanine Meerapfel =

German-Argentine film director

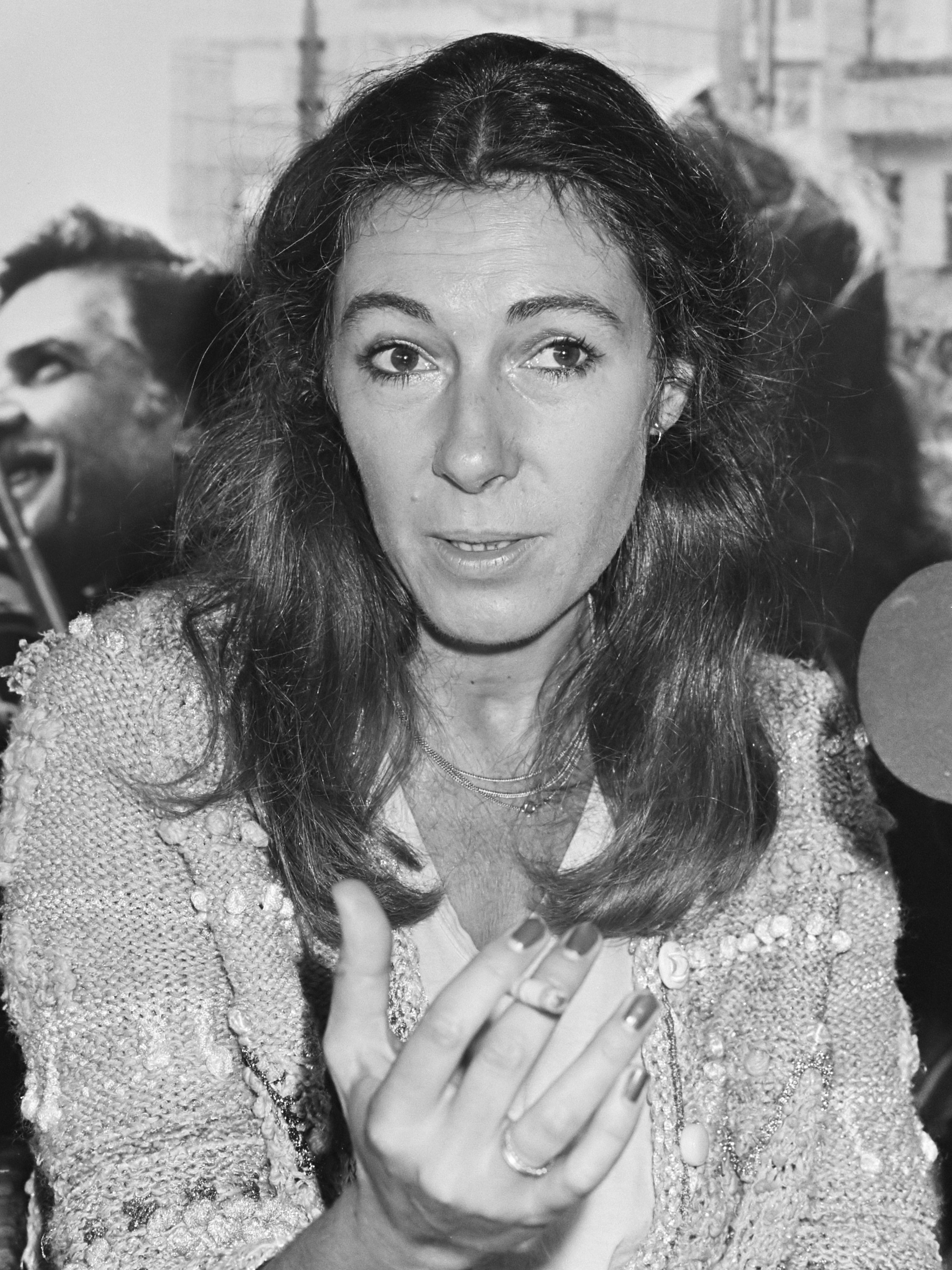
- Jeanine Meerapfel (1981)
- Born: 14 June 1943 (age 82); Buenos Aires, Argentina
- Occupations: Film director Screenwriter
- Years active: 1966–present

Jeanine Meerapfel (born 14 June 1943) is a German-Argentine film director and screenwriter. She has directed twenty films since 1966. In 1984, she was a member of the jury at the 34th Berlin International Film Festival.

She was born in 1943, in Buenos Aires, Argentina, and moved to Ulm, Germany in 1964 to study at the Institute for Film at the Academy of Art and Design. In 1981, her debut feature film Malou was an autobiographical story of a woman's life in Germany, France and Argentina. The film won the FIPRESCI prize at the Cannes Film Festival, as well as awards at the San Sebastián International Film Festival. Critics noted that Malou's style was distinct from other autobiographical feminist films in New German Cinema. Her 1987 film Days to Remember was entered into the 37th Berlin International Film Festival.

== Selected filmography ==
- Malou (1981)
- Die Kümmeltürkin geht (1985)
- Days to Remember (1987)
- The Girlfriend (1988)
- Desembarcos (1989)
- Amigomío (1994)
- Mosconi - oder wem gehört die Welt (2007)
- The German Friend (2012)
