= Vera (1986 film) =

1986 film directed by Sérgio Toledo

- Theatrical release poster
- Directed by: Sérgio Toledo
- Written by: Sérgio Toledo; Felipe Daviña; André Macedo
- Produced by: Sérgio Toledo
- Starring: Ana Beatriz Nogueira; Norma Blum; Raul Cortez; Carlos Kroeber
- Cinematography: Rodolfo Sánchez
- Edited by: Tércio G. da Mota
- Music by: Arrigo Barnabé
- Production companies: Nexus Filmes; Embrafilme
- Distributed by: Embrafilme
- Release date: October 19, 1986
- Running time: 87 minutes
- Country: Brazil
- Language: Portuguese

Vera is a 1986 Brazilian semi-biographical drama film written and directed by Sérgio Toledo. Shot in São Paulo, it stars Ana Beatriz Nogueira, Norma Blum, Raul Cortez, Carlos Kroeber, and Aída Leiner. The film is based on the life of Anderson Bigode Herzer, a transgender man most known as the author of poems book A queda para o alto (Descending Upwards). Both the book and the movie cover the story of a trans man who attempts to find himself while living in a boarding school in São Paulo, but experiences many prejudices and traumatic experiences.

The initial conception for the film's script came following research carried out by the Brazilian government organization Fundação de Bem-Estar do Menor (Febem), as well as the reports written by Herzer in his book, which was published after his death. Funding for the film came from Embrafilme as well as the private sector.

Ana Beatriz Nogueira's performance was acclaimed by critics and earned her numerous awards, including the Silver Bear in the Best Actress category at the Berlin International Film Festival, the second Brazilian actress to achieve this following Marcélia Cartaxo's win for Hour of the Star.

== Plot ==
Bauer (birth name "Vera") is a transsexual man who lives in a correctional facility for young people. After writing a book of verses about his life as a young troubled youth, he meets a benevolent, educated man, who helps him. The man even allows him to spend some time at his home, and arranges for a job for him as an intern in his office.

He comes into his gender identity and begins to dress as a man, eventually falling in love with a woman and passing as cisgender to her family.

The film succeeds in focusing on Bauer's personality and feelings until his tragic death.

== Cast ==
- Ana Beatriz Nogueira as Bauer
- Norma Blum
- Raul Cortez as Eduardo Suplicy
- Carlos Kroeber
- Adriana Abujamra
- Cida Almeida
- Liana Duval
- Abrahão Farc
- Aida Leiner
- Imara Reis

== Reception ==
In 1986, at the Festival de Brasília it won the awards for Best Actress (Nogueira), Best Soundtrack (Arrigo Barnabé), and Best Sound (José Luiz Sasso). In 1987, Nogueira won the Silver Bear for Best Actress at the 37th Berlin International Film Festival, where Vera was nominated for Best Film. At the Three Continents Festival Nogueira received a Honourable Mention.

== See also ==
- Rosely Roth
