= Rosa Luxemburg (film) =

1986 West German drama film

- Theatrical release poster
- Directed by: Margarethe von Trotta
- Written by: Margarethe von Trotta
- Produced by: Eberhard Junkersdorf; Regina Ziegler
- Starring: Barbara Sukowa
- Cinematography: Franz Rath
- Edited by: Dagmar Hirtz
- Music by: Soundtrack by Nicolas Economou
- Distributed by: Concorde
- Release date: 10 April 1986
- Running time: 123 minutes
- Country: West Germany
- Language: German
- Box office: 508,284 admissions (Germany)

Rosa Luxemburg is a 1986 West German drama film directed by Margarethe von Trotta. The film received the 1986 German Film Award for Best Feature Film (Bester Spielfilm), and Barbara Sukowa won the Cannes Film Festival's Best Actress Award and the German Film Award for Best Actress for her performance as Rosa Luxemburg.

== Plot ==
Polish socialist and Marxist Rosa Luxemburg dreams about revolution during the era of German Wilhelminism. While Luxemburg campaigns relentlessly for her beliefs, getting repeatedly imprisoned in Germany as well as in Poland, she spars with lovers and comrades until Luxemburg is assassinated by Freikorps for her leadership in the Spartacist uprising after World War I in 1919.

== Cast ==
- Barbara Sukowa as Rosa Luxemburg
- Daniel Olbrychski as Leo Jogiches
- Otto Sander as Karl Liebknecht
- Adelheid Arndt as Luise Kautsky
- Jürgen Holtz as Karl Kautsky
- Doris Schade as Clara Zetkin
- Hannes Jaenicke as Kostja Zetkin
- Jan Biczycki as August Bebel
- Karin Baal as Mathilde Jacob
- Winfried Glatzeder as Paul Levi
- Regina Lemnitz as Gertrud
- Barbara Lass as Rosa's mother
- Dayna Drozdek as Rosa, 6 years old
- Henryk Baranowski as Josef, Rosa's brother
- Patrizia Lazreg as Josef's daughter
- Charles Régnier as Jean Jaurès

== Reception ==
Vincent Canby of The New York Times wrote: "Miss von Trotta's film, with a fine, soberly intelligent performance by Barbara Sukowa (the seductive star of Rainer Werner Fassbinder's Lola), is a first-rate introduction to an extremely complicated personality. It's necessarily simplified, as well as biased on behalf of those aspects of Luxemburg that will speak most clearly to today's audiences."

On the review aggregator website Rotten Tomatoes, 80% of 10 critics' reviews are positive, with an average rating of 7/10.
