= Forget About Nick =

- Film poster
- Directed by: Margarethe von Trotta
- Screenplay by: Pamela Katz
- Produced by: Bettina Brokemper
- Starring: Ingrid Bolsø Berdal; Katja Riemann; Haluk Bilginer
- Cinematography: Jo Heim
- Edited by: Christian Krämer
- Music by: Helmut Zerlett
- Production company: Heimatfilm
- Distributed by: Warner Bros. Pictures
- Release dates: September 29, 2017 (Film Festival Cologne); December 7, 2017 (Germany)
- Running time: 110 minutes
- Country: Germany
- Languages: German; English

Forget About Nick is a 2017 German romantic comedy drama film directed by Margarethe von Trotta and starring Ingrid Bolsø Berdal, Katja Riemann and Haluk Bilginer.

== Cast ==
- Ingrid Bolsø Berdal as Jade
- Katja Riemann as Maria
- Haluk Bilginer as Nick
- Tinka Fürst as Antonia
- Fredrik Wagner as Whit
- Mathias Sanders as Lawrence
- Lucie Pohl as Lucie
- Paula Riemann as Caroline
- Vico Magno as Paul
