= Remembrance (2011 film) =

2011 German drama film

- Directed by: Anna Justice
- Written by: Pamela Katz
- Starring: Alice Dwyer; Dagmar Manzel; Mateusz Damięcki
- Release date: 24 November 2011
- Running time: 105 minutes
- Country: Germany
- Languages: German, Polish, English

Remembrance (Polish: Zagubiony Czas German: Die verlorene Zeit The Lost Time) is a 2011 German drama film directed by Anna Justice. A German-Jewish young woman and Polish young man fall in love and escape a Nazi German concentration camp. As the film prologue notes, it is based on the true story of Jerzy Bielecki and Cyla Cybulska.

== Plot ==
The film's story intercuts between a Nazi German concentration camp in occupied Poland, in 1944 and New York City in 1976.

In 1944, Tomasz Limanowski, a captured member of the Polish resistance, manages to aid the resistance from inside a concentration camp, where his slave labor includes supervising distribution of loaves of bread. His resistance task in the camp has been to capture photos of the horrifying war crimes taking place and smuggle out the negatives that will reveal the crimes to the outside world.

This is unknown to Hannah Silberstein, a young German Jew in the work camp with whom Tomasz is in love and who has recently discovered she is pregnant. Every night, Tomasz buys off his officemate with a bottle of vodka so that he and Hannah can be alone together in the office in which Tomasz works with the SS, and they share bread that Tomasz has stolen for them.

In 1976, interwoven scenes open the story on the day that Hannah Levine, living in Brooklyn, New York with a successful husband and their grown daughter, discovers that Tomasz, who for 30 years she had believed was dead, is alive. While preparing for a celebratory dinner party for her husband and running an errand at a local dry cleaners, Hannah sees Tomasz in an interview on TV and instantly recognizes him as he shares his story about their love with the interviewer. In a daze, Hannah rushes home, experiencing reactivated trauma that she had shelved, unable to keep her mind on the evening's party and raising the concerns of her family and guests at her distractedness. She desperately calls the Red Cross that day, for the first time since 1946, when her initial search for Tomasz had led to a dead end.

Cutting back to 1944, we see Tomasz implementing a plan for their salvation with the help of fellow inmates, gaining access to an SS uniform and paperwork. On the day of the escape, terrified that it is happening too quickly to be fully prepared, Tomasz dresses up as an SS officer and demands that Hannah follow him, all the while terrified that he will be exposed as a Polish prisoner. Tomasz walks her to the exit of the camp where another SS officer comments that he'd like to rape her; Tomasz barely holds his cover and coldly insists that he have Hannah first. The guard, not picking up on Tomasz's limited German, acquiesces, and Tomasz and Hannah successfully march down the road until out of sight and run off into the woods.

They run for weeks, ending up in Tomasz's hometown, at his mother's house. Tomasz's mother, Stefania, does not approve of Hannah, as the latter is both German and a Jew, and furiously insists that Hannah will cause trouble for their family. Hannah, weak and distressed by the outburst, miscarries the same night that a car is ready to take Tomasz to Warsaw, where he must deliver the photos to his brother, who is in the homeland army. With no other option, Tomasz leaves Hannah in his mother's care and tells his neighbor and family friend, Janusz, to take Hannah to the home of Tomasz's sister-in-law, Magdalena, where Hannah can hide more safely. Tomasz assures Hannah he will only be gone for a few days.

Tomasz winds up being gone for a long while. During her recovery at Stefania's, Hannah comes to experience the woman's full animosity when Stefania attempts to have a German officer discover Hannah, but Hannah suspects her motives and hides. Disgusted at this betrayal, Hannah leaves immediately afterward, taking a photo of Tomasz that his mother had kept framed in a place of honor. Hannah goes to Magdalena's home to wait for Tomasz but is still forced to hide from the world.

When Czeslav, Tomasz's brother, returns home from Warsaw, hopes for Tomasz's return are high. However, after a month of the three living together, Czeslav comes to believe that Tomasz must be dead, a belief that Hannah refuses to accept.

Things are tense but harmonious until Stefania shows up at their home, claiming that the Russians took over her home. She soon turns against Magdalena, accusing her of having brought misfortune to the family and criticizing her for letting Hannah live in the house.

Shortly afterward, the Russians show up at their home and take Czeslav and Magdalena to a Soviet work camp; Stefania and Hannah are left behind. Hannah cannot stay with Tomasz's mother, knowing she cannot trust her, and believes it will be for the best if she returns home to Berlin. She trudges off in winter snow and nearly dies but for a passing Red Cross van that happens upon her.

Back to 1976, Hannah has success - the Red Cross has tracked Tomasz down in Poland. She works up the courage to call him; both are in complete shock that the other has survived. Tomasz initially thinks it is a hoax, but Hannah persists. They speak briefly, at first speaking trepidatiously in German, until they both realize the conversation is much easier in English as both have had much exposure to the language in their subsequent decades. Hannah tells him for the first time that she had been pregnant, a revelation too much for her to bear herself, and she hangs up, promising to call again. A brief flashback reveals that long after Hannah returned to Berlin, Tomasz returned home to find only his mother, who told him that Czeslav and Magdalena had been sent to a work camp, and (disingenuously) that Hannah had died.

Back in 1976, after a wrenching outing of her secret search that anguishes her husband and daughter, Hannah's husband encourages her to go see this man who saved her. Hannah travels to Poland to visit Tomasz, who has a grown daughter of his own and is separated from his wife. The movie ends with Hannah and Tomasz seeing each other after Hannah has just gotten off the bus and Tomasz has come by car to pick her up.

== Cast ==
- Alice Dwyer as Hannah Silberstein 1944
- Dagmar Manzel as Hannah Levine 1976
- Mateusz Damięcki as Tomasz Limanowski 1944
- Susanne Lothar as Stefania Limanowska
- Shantel VanSanten as Rebecca Levine
- David Rasche as Daniel Levine
- Lech Mackiewicz as Tomasz Limanowski 1976
- Joanna Kulig as Magdalena Limanowska
- Mirosław Zbrojewicz as Janusz
- Adrian Topol as Czeslaw Limanowski
- Florian Lukas as Hans von Eidem

== Production ==
The filmmakers call Remembrance "a story about the effects of chance and the notion of the path not taken and the life not lived."

Pamela Katz, who wrote the screenplay, has extensively researched Germany's pre-war and wartime history but admitted to feeling some trepidation about the prospect of writing a film about Auschwitz, especially one that entertained the possibility of love and freedom. However, her research unearthed four instances of couples who escaped the camp in 1944, the year in which Remembrance is set, and she incorporated into the script some of the facts she found.

== See also ==
- Rescue of Jews during the Holocaust
