= Ana Beatriz Nogueira =

Brazilian actress (born 1967)

- Born: 22 October 1967 (age 58); Rio de Janeiro, Brazil
- Occupation: Actress
- Years active: 1984–present

Ana Beatriz Soares Nogueira (born 22 October 1967) is a Brazilian actress. In 1987, she won the Silver Bear for Best Actress at the 37th Berlin International Film Festival for her role in the film Vera, directed by Sérgio Toledo.

== Filmography ==
=== Television ===
Year	Title	Role	Notes
1984	Santa Marta Fabril S.A		
1986	Mania de Querer		
1988	O Pagador de Promessas		
1989	Kananga do Japão	Alzira Tavares	
1991	O Sorriso do Lagarto	Evangelina	
1991	Felicidade	Selma	
1992	As Noivas de Copacabana		
1995	Você Decide		
1996	O Rei do Gado	Jacira	
1997	Anjo Mau	Duda (Maria Eduarda Medeiros)	
1999	Andando nas Nuvens	Marta	
2001	Estrela-Guia	Esperança	
2003	A Casa das Sete Mulheres	Dona Rosa	
2003	Celebridade	Ana Paula Mello Diniz Moutinho	
2004	Sob Nova Direção		
2005	Essas Mulheres	Leocádia Duarte	
2006	Bicho do Mato		
2008	Ciranda de Pedra		
2009	Caminho das Índias	Ilana Gallo Goulart	
2011	Insensato Coração	Clarice Cortez	
2011	A Vida da Gente	Eva Ribeiro Fonseca	
2012	Salve Jorge	Rachel Flores Galvão	
2013	Saramandaia	Maria Aparecida Moreira (Maria Aparadeira)	
2014	Em Família	Selma Proença Fernandes	
2015	Além do Tempo	Emília "Allegra" Diffiori / Emília Navona Beraldini	
2016	Rock Story	Néia	
2018	Malhação Vidas Brasileiras	Isadora Mantovani	Season 26
2018	O Sétimo Guardião	Ondina Aballo	
2021	Um Lugar ao Sol	Elenice	
2022	Todas as Flores	Guiomar Martínez Barreto	
2024	Mania de Você	Moema	
2026	Três Graças	Judge Nara	

=== Film ===
Year	Title	Role	Notes
1987	Vera	Bauer	
1990	Stelinha		
1991	Matou a Família e Foi ao Cinema		
1995	Jenipapo		
2000	Villa-Lobos - Uma Vida de Paixão	Lucília	
2001	Copacabana		
2002	Querido Estranho		
2002	Lara		
2002	Poeta de Sete Faces		
2004	O Diabo a Quatro		
2004	O Vestido		
2006	Mulheres do Brasil		
