= Days to Remember =

1987 film

- Directed by: Jeanine Meerapfel
- Written by: Jeanine Meerapfel
- Produced by: Aleksandar Stojanović
- Starring: Barbara Sukowa
- Cinematography: Predrag Popović
- Edited by: Ursula West
- Release date: 1987
- Running time: 95 minutes
- Countries: West Germany; Yugoslavia
- Language: German

Days to Remember (German: Die Verliebten) is a 1987 West German-Yugoslav drama film directed by Jeanine Meerapfel. It was entered into the 37th Berlin International Film Festival.

== Cast ==
- Barbara Sukowa as Katharina
- Horst-Günter Marx as Peter
- Bata Živojinović as Onkel Savo
- Rade Šerbedžija as Dušan
- Ljiljana Kontić as Mutter
- Stela Ćetković as Danica
- Igor Hajdarhodžić as Nikola
- Milan Erak as Motorradfahrer
- Veljko Mandić as Alter Ivo
- Dušanka Todić as Tante Gordana
- Silva Povsić as Tante Ljubica
- Svjetlana Knežević as Gasthofswirtin
