= 37th Berlin International Film Festival =

1987 film festival in West Berlin, Germany

- Festival poster
- Location: West Berlin, Germany
- Founded: 1951
- Awards: Golden Bear: The Theme
- No. of films: 321 films
- Festival date: 20 February – 3 March 1987
- Website: http://www.berlinale.de

Berlin International Film Festival chronology
- 38th 36th

The 37th annual Berlin International Film Festival was held from 20 February to 3 March 1987. The Golden Bear was awarded to the Soviet film Tema, directed by Gleb Panfilov.

The retrospective was in honour of Armenian-American film and theatre director Rouben Mamoulian. The homage was dedicated to French couple Jean-Louis Barrault, actor and director, and Madeleine Renaud, actress. It was titled Renaud-Barrault au cinéma.

== Juries ==
=== Main Competition ===
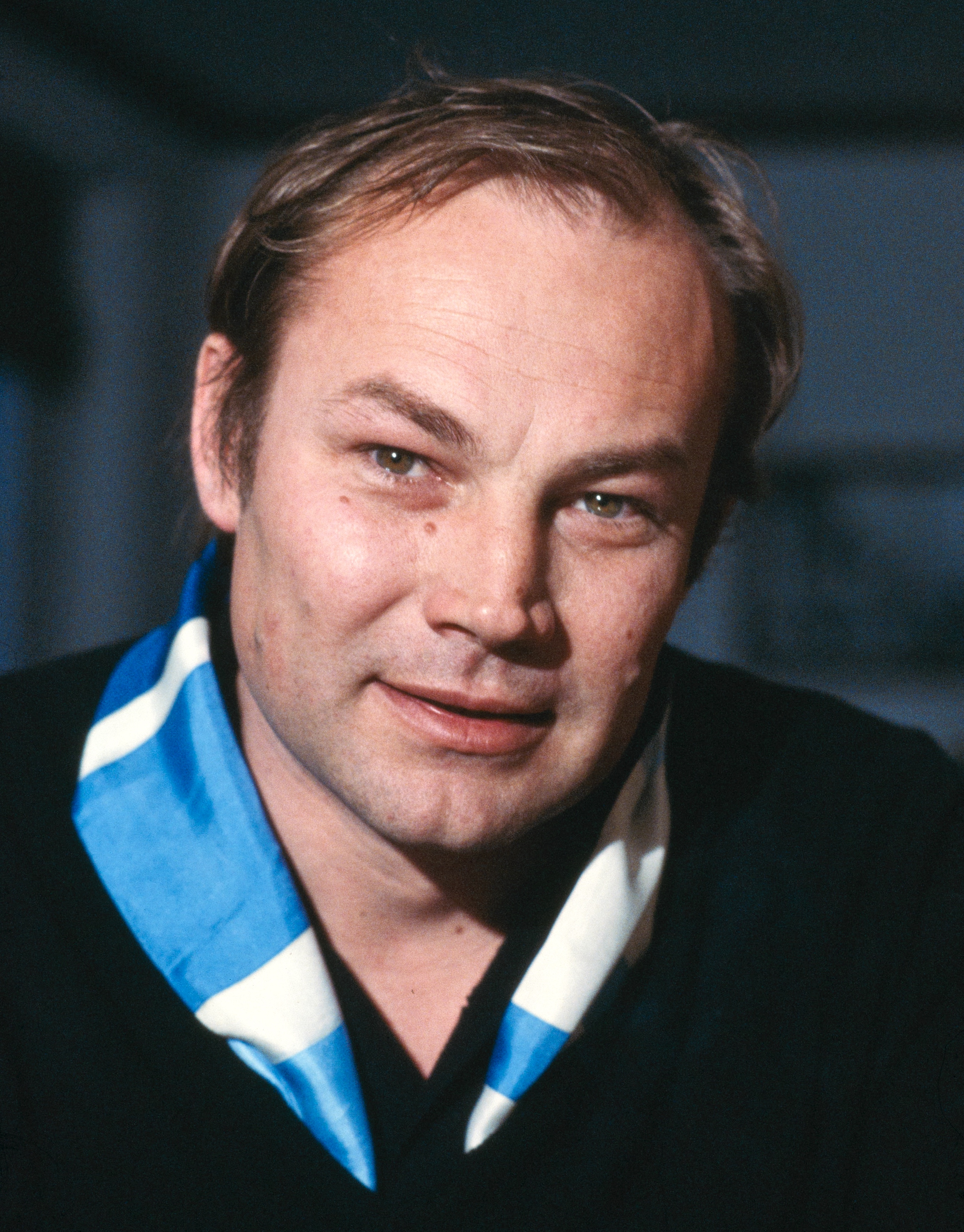
Klaus Maria Brandauer, Jury President

The following people were announced as being on the jury for the festival:

- Klaus Maria Brandauer, Austrian actor - Jury President
- Juliet Berto, French actress and filmmaker
- Kathleen Carroll, American film critic
- Callisto Cosulich, Italian film critic
- Victor Dyomin, Soviet actor and screenwriter
- Reinhard Hauff, German filmmaker
- Edmund Luft, West-German playwright, film critic and film historian
- Jiří Menzel, Czech actor and filmmaker
- Dan Pița, Romanian filmmaker
- Paul Schrader, American filmmaker and film critic
- Antonio Skármeta, Chilean writer

== Official Sections ==
=== Main Competition ===
The following films were in competition for the Golden Bear:

English title	Original title	Director(s)	Production Country
Children of a Lesser God		Randa Haines	United States
Comrades		Bill Douglas	United Kingdom
Days to Remember	Die Verliebten	Jeanine Meerapfel	West Germany, Yugoslavia
The Death of Empedocles	Der Tod des Empedokles	Danièle Huillet, Jean-Marie Straub	West Germany, France
Diary for My Lovers	Napló szerelmeimnek	Márta Mészáros	Hungary
For Love Alone		Stephen Wallace	Australia
In the Shadow of the Wind	Les Fous de Bassan	Yves Simoneau	Canada, France
Masks	Masques	Claude Chabrol	France
Mauvais Sang		Leos Carax	France
The Miracle	Le Miraculé	Jean-Pierre Mocky	France
The Moro Affair	Il caso Moro	Giuseppe Ferrara	Italy
Mournful Unconcern	Скорбное бесчувствие	Alexander Sokurov	Soviet Union
'night, Mother		Tom Moore	United States
Platoon		Oliver Stone	United States
The Sea and Poison	海と毒薬	Kei Kumai	Japan
So Many Dreams	So viele Träume	Heiner Carow	East Germany
The Theme	Тема	Gleb Panfilov	Soviet Union
Vera		Sérgio Toledo	Brazil
Wolf's Hole	Vlčí bouda	Věra Chytilová	Czechoslovakia
Year of Enlightment	El año de las luces	Fernando Trueba	Spain

=== Out of competition ===
- Farewell, directed by Elem Klimov (Soviet Union)
- The Color of Money, directed by Martin Scorsese (United States)
- A Chronicle of Amorous Accidents, directed by Andrzej Wajda (Poland)
- The Little Prosecutor, directed by Hark Bohm (West Germany)
- Light of Day, directed by Paul Schrader (United States)
- Ein Treffen mit Rimbaud, directed by Ernst-August Zurborn (West Germany)
- True Stories, directed by David Byrne (United States)

=== Retrospective ===
The following films were shown in the retrospective dedicated to Rouben Mamoulian:

Original title	Director(s)	Country
Applause	Rouben Mamoulian	United States
Becky Sharp	Rouben Mamoulian	United States
Blood and Sand	Rouben Mamoulian	United States
City Streets	Rouben Mamoulian	United States
Dr. Jekyll and Mr. Hyde	Rouben Mamoulian	United States
The Gay Desperado	Rouben Mamoulian	United States
Golden Boy	Rouben Mamoulian	United States
High, Wide, and Handsome	Rouben Mamoulian	United States
Interview With Mamoulian	Philip Jenkinson	United Kingdom
Love Me Tonight	Rouben Mamoulian	United States
The Mark of Zorro	Rouben Mamoulian	United States
Queen Christina	Rouben Mamoulian	United States
Rings on Her Fingers	Rouben Mamoulian	United States
Silk Stockings	Rouben Mamoulian	United States
The Song of Songs	Rouben Mamoulian	United States
Summer Holiday	Rouben Mamoulian	United States
We Live Again	Rouben Mamoulian	United States

The following films were shown in the homage titled "Renaud-Barrault au cinéma" dedicated to Jean-Louis Barrault and Madeleine Renaud:

English title	Original title	Director(s)	Country
Bizarre, Bizarre	Drôle de drame	Marcel Carné	France
Entire Days in the Trees	Des journées entières dans les arbres	Marguerite Duras	France
Hélène		Jean Benoît-Lévy	France
Jean de la Lune		Jean Choux	France
Jean-Louis Barrault: Le langage du corps		Muriel Balash	United States, France
Jean-Louis Barrault, A Man of the Theatre	Jean-Louis Barrault, Un homme de théâtre	Muriel Balash	United States, France
Kinder des Olymp: Madeleine Renaud und Jean Louis Barrault		Birgitta Ashoff	West Germany
Children of Montmartre	La Maternelle	Jean Benoît-Lévy and Marie Epstein	France
That Night in Varennes	La Nuit de Varennes	Ettore Scola	France, Italy
Blind Desire	La Part de l'ombre	Jean Delannoy	France
La Ronde		Max Ophüls	France
The Fantastic Symphony	La Symphonie fantastique	Christian-Jaque	France
Blood on His Sword	Le Miracle des loups	André Hunebelle	France
House of Pleasure	Le Plaisir	Max Ophüls	France
The Puritan	Le puritain	Jeff Musso	France
Children of Paradise	Les Enfants du Paradis	Marcel Carné	France
The Doctor's Horrible Experiment	Le Testament du docteur Cordelier	Jean Renoir	France
The Strange Monsieur Victor	L'Étrange Monsieur Victor	Jean Grémillon	France
The Tunnel	Le Tunnel	Kurt Bernhardt	France, Germany
L'Or dans la montagne		Max Haufler	Switzerland, France
Summer Light	Lumière d'été	Jean Grémillon	France
Maria Chapdelaine		Julien Duvivier	France
Portrait of Madeleine Renaud	Portrait de Madeleine Renaud	Jean-Marie Carzou	France
Stormy Waters	Remorques	Jean Grémillon	France
Midship	Vent debout	René Leprince	France

== Official Awards ==
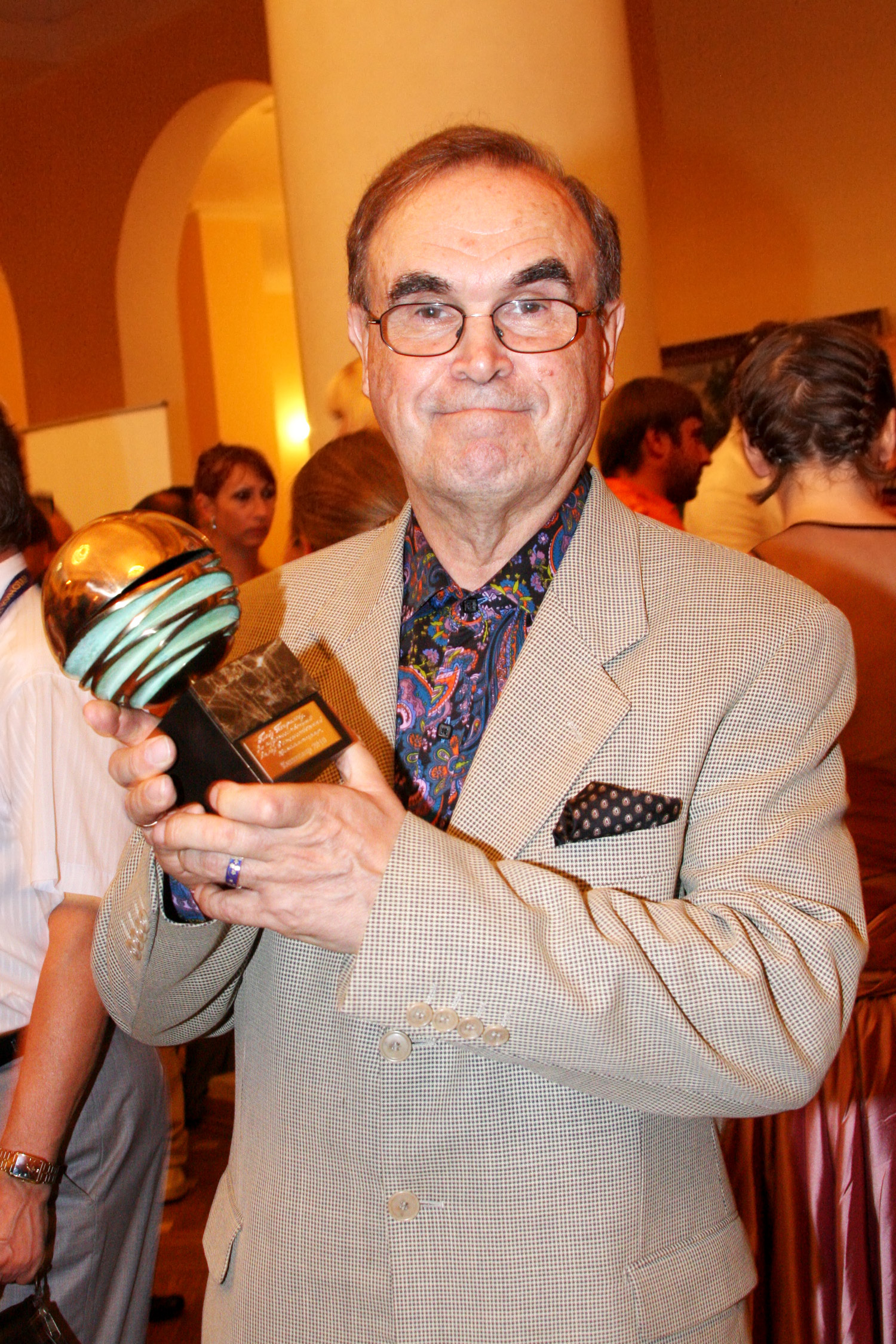
Gleb Panfilov, winner of the Golden Bear at the event

The following prizes were awarded by the Jury:

- Golden Bear: The Theme by Gleb Panfilov
- Silver Bear – Special Jury Prize: The Sea and Poison by Kei Kumai
- Silver Bear for Best Director: Oliver Stone for Platoon
- Silver Bear for Best Actress: Ana Beatriz Nogueira for Vera
- Silver Bear for Best Actor: Gian Maria Volonté for The Moro Affair
- Silver Bear for an outstanding single achievement:
  - Márta Mészáros for Diary for My Lovers
  - Fernando Trueba for Year of Enlightment
- Silver Bear for an outstanding artistic contribution: Children of a Lesser God
- Alfred Bauer Prize: Mauvais Sang

== Independent Awards ==
=== FIPRESCI Award ===
- The Theme by Gleb Panfilov
