= Sérgio Toledo =

Brazilian film director (born 1956)

- Born: 1956 (age 69–70); São Paulo, Brazil
- Occupation: Film director
- Years active: 1978–1991

Sérgio Segall (born 1956) is a Brazilian screenwriter and director most known for his film Vera, that won the Silver Bear for Best Actress for Ana Beatriz Nogueira and a nomination for Golden Bear (best film) at the 37th Berlin International Film Festival.

Segall is also one of the members of the Klabin Segall family who founded the real estate developer Klabin Segall S.A.

He is the son of actress Beatriz Segall and Maurício Klabin Segall, the grandson of painter Lasar Segall and translator Jenny Klabin Segall, and the great-grandson of Maurício Freeman Klabin, founder of Klabin S.A.

== Filmography ==
- 1979: Braços cruzados, máquinas paradas
- 1987: Vera
- 1991: One Man's War
