= Sisters, or the Balance of Happiness =

1979 West German drama film

- DVD cover
- Directed by: Margarethe von Trotta
- Written by: Margarethe von Trotta; Luisa Francia; Martje Grohmann; Wolfgang Bächler
- Cinematography: Franz Rath
- Edited by: Annette Dorn
- Music by: Konstantin Wecker
- Distributed by: Cinema 5 Distributing (USA)
- Release dates: 18 September 1979 (Filmfest Hamburg); 31 January 1980 (U.S.)
- Running time: 95 minutes
- Country: West Germany
- Language: German

Sisters, or the Balance of Happiness (German: Schwestern oder Die Balance des Glücks) is a 1979 West German drama film written and directed by Margarethe von Trotta.

== Cast ==
- Jutta Lampe as Maria Sundermann
- Gudrun Gabriel as Anna Sundermann
- Jessica Früh as Miriam Grau
- Konstantin Wecker as Robert Edelschneider
- Agnes Fink as Mutter Sundermann
- Heinz Bennent as Münzinger
- Rainer Delventhal as Maurice Münzinger
- Fritz Lichtenhahn as Fritz
- Günther Schütz as Professor
- Ilse Bahrs as Blinde Frau
- Barbara Sauerbaum as Maria as a Child
- Marie-Helena Diekmann as Anna as a Child
- Lieselotte Arnold as Frau Eder
- Editha Horn as Sister of Blind Woman
- Ellen Esser as Nurse Fritz
- Heinrich Marmann as Porter
- Edith Garden as English language teacher
- Kathie Thomsen as Flutist
- Volker Schwab as Robert's Colleague

== Accolades ==
In 1980, the film won the Film Award in Gold at the German Film Awards and in 1981 it won the Grand Prix at the Créteil International Women's Film Festival.
