= New German Cinema =

Period in German cinema

- Years active: 1962–1982
- Location: West Germany
- Major figures: Hansjürgen Pohland, Herbert Vesely, Harun Farocki, Peter Fleischmann, Rainer Werner Fassbinder, Werner Herzog, Alexander Kluge, Ulli Lommel, Wolfgang Petersen, Edgar Reitz, Helma Sanders-Brahms, Peter Schamoni, Volker Schlöndorff, Werner Schroeter, Straub-Huillet, Hans-Jürgen Syberberg, Margarethe von Trotta, Rosa von Praunheim, Wim Wenders
- Influences: French New Wave; Classical Hollywood Cinema; Italian Neorealism

New German Cinema (German: Neuer Deutscher Film) is a period in West German cinema which lasted from 1962 to 1982, in which a new generation of directors emerged who, working with low budgets, and influenced by the French New Wave and Italian Neorealism, gained notice by producing a number of "small" motion pictures that caught the attention of art house audiences. These filmmakers included Percy Adlon, Harun Farocki, Rainer Werner Fassbinder, Peter Fleischmann, Werner Herzog, Alexander Kluge, Ulli Lommel, Wolfgang Petersen, Volker Schlöndorff, Helma Sanders-Brahms, Werner Schroeter, Hans-Jürgen Syberberg, Margarethe von Trotta and Wim Wenders. As a result of the attention they garnered, they were able (particularly in the case of Wenders, Petersen, and Schlöndorff) to create better-financed productions which were backed by the big US studios. However, most of these larger films were commercial failures and the movement was heavily dependent on subsidies. By 1977, 80% of a budget for a typical West German film was ensured by a subsidy.

Most of the directors of the New German Cinema movement were members of their self-owned Filmverlag der Autoren association founded in 1971, which funded and distributed most of their films, and the history of New German Cinema from the 1970s onwards was largely synonymous with it.

== History ==
As a reaction to the artistic and economic stagnation of West German cinema, a group of young filmmakers issued the Oberhausen Manifesto on 28 February 1962. This call to arms, which included Hansjürgen (aka Jason) Pohland, Herbert Vesely, Alexander Kluge, Edgar Reitz, Peter Schamoni, Haro Senft and Franz-Josef Spieker among its signatories, provocatively declared "Der alte Film ist tot. Wir glauben an den neuen" ("The old cinema is dead. We believe in the new cinema"). Other younger filmmakers allied themselves to this Oberhausen group, among them Volker Schlöndorff, Werner Herzog, Jean-Marie Straub, Wim Wenders, Hans-Jürgen Syberberg and Rainer Werner Fassbinder in their rejection of the existing West German film industry and their determination to build a new industry founded on artistic excellence rather than commercial dictates.

Despite the foundation of the Kuratorium Junger Deutscher Film (Young German Film Committee) in 1965, set up under the auspices of the Federal Ministry of the Interior to support new West German films financially, the directors of this New German Cinema, who rejected co-operation with the existing film industry, were consequently often dependent on money from television. Young filmmakers had the opportunity to test their mettle in such programmes as the stand-alone drama and documentary series Das kleine Fernsehspiel (The Little TV Play) or the television films of the crime series Tatort. However, the broadcasters sought TV premieres for the films which they had supported financially, with theatrical showings only occurring later. As a consequence, such films tended to be unsuccessful at the cinema box-office.

This situation changed after 1974 with the Film-Fernseh-Abkommen (Film and Television Accord) an agreement between the Federal Republic's main broadcasters, ARD and ZDF, and the German Federal Film Board (a government body created in 1968 to support film-making in West Germany). This accord, which has been repeatedly extended, provides for the television companies to allocate an annual sum to support films suitable for both theatrical distribution and television presentation (with amounts varying between €4.5 and 12.94 million per year). The terms of the accord stipulated that films produced using these funds could only be screened on television 24 months after their theatrical release and on video or DVD no sooner than six months after cinema release. As a result, German films, particularly those of the New German Cinema, gained greater opportunities for box-office success before their television premieres.

The artistically ambitious and socially critical films of the New German Cinema strove to delineate themselves from what had gone before and the works of auteur filmmakers such as Kluge and Fassbinder are examples of this, although Fassbinder in his use of stars from West German cinema history also sought a reconciliation between the new cinema and the old. In addition, a distinction is sometimes drawn between the avant-garde "Young German Cinema" of the 1960s and the more accessible "New German Cinema" of the 1970s. For their influences, the new generation of filmmakers looked to Italian Neorealism, the French Nouvelle Vague and the British New Wave but combined this eclectically with references to the well-established genres of Hollywood cinema. The new movement saw German cinema return to international critical significance for the first time since the end of the Weimar Republic. Films such as Kluge's Abschied von gestern (Yesterday Girl, 1966), Herzog's Aguirre, the Wrath of God (1972), Fassbinder's Fear Eats the Soul (1974) and The Marriage of Maria Braun (1979), and Wenders' Paris, Texas (1984) found international acclaim and critical approval. Often the work of these auteurs was first recognised abroad rather than in West Germany itself. The work of post-war Germany's leading novelists Heinrich Böll and Günter Grass provided source material for the adaptations The Bread of Those Early Years (1962) (by Herbert Vesely, produced by Hansjürgen Pohland's Modern Art Film) awarded five film bands in gold, Cat and Mouse (1967) (by Hansjürgen Pohland), The Lost Honour of Katharina Blum (1975) (by Schlöndorff and Margarethe von Trotta) and The Tin Drum (1979) (by Schlöndorff alone) respectively, the latter becoming the first German film to win the Academy Award for Best Foreign Language Film. Although overlooked in early scholarship on New German Cinema, female directors were an important part of it, which encompassed the works of directors such as Danièle Huillet, Helma Sanders-Brahms, Helke Sander, and von Trotta. Rosa von Praunheim, who formed the German lesbian and gay movement with his film It Is Not the Homosexual Who Is Perverse, But the Society in Which He Lives (1971), can also be counted to the movement.

== List of New German movies ==
- Tobby (1960)
- The Bread of Those Early Years (1962)
- Machorka-Muff (1963)
- Yesterday Girl (1966)
- Young Törless (1966)
- Cat and Mouse (1967)
- Artists Under the Big Top: Perplexed (1968)
- Hunting Scenes from Bavaria (1969)
- It Is Not the Homosexual Who Is Perverse, But the Society in Which He Lives (1971)
- Aguirre, the Wrath of God (1972)
- World on a Wire (1973)
- Ali: Fear Eats the Soul (1974)
- Alice in the Cities (1974)
- Fox and His Friends (1975)
- The Lost Honour of Katharina Blum (1975)
- Under the Pavement Lies the Strand (1975)
- Kings of the Road (1976)
- The American Friend (1977)
- Germany in Autumn (1977)
- Die Konsequenz (1977)
- The Second Awakening of Christa Klages (1978)
- The Tin Drum (1979)
- Nosferatu the Vampyre (1979)
- The Marriage of Maria Braun (1979)
- Berlin Alexanderplatz (1980)
- Céleste (1980)
- Lola (1981)
- Marianne and Juliane (1981)
- Veronika Voss (1982)
- Fitzcarraldo (1982)
- Five Last Days (1982)
- The Swing (1983)
- Paris, Texas (1984)
- Sugarbaby (1985)
