= Sheer Madness =

1983 film

- Film poster
- Directed by: Margarethe von Trotta
- Written by: Margarethe von Trotta
- Produced by: Eberhard Junkersdorf; Margaret Ménégoz
- Starring: Hanna Schygulla; Angela Winkler
- Cinematography: Michael Ballhaus
- Edited by: Dagmar Hirtz
- Release date: 24 February 1983; (Berlin)
- Running time: 105 minutes
- Country: West Germany
- Language: German

Sheer Madness (German: Heller Wahn, and also released as Friends and Husbands) is a 1983 German arthouse drama film directed by Margarethe von Trotta. It was entered into the 33rd Berlin International Film Festival.

== Cast ==
- Hanna Schygulla as Olga
- Angela Winkler as Ruth
- Peter Striebeck as Franz
- Christine Fersen as Erika
- Franz Buchrieser as Dieter
- Wladimir Yordanoff as Alexaj
- Agnes Fink as Ruth's mother
- Felix Moeller as Christof
- Jochen Striebeck as Bruno
- Therese Affolter as Renate
- Werner Eichhorn as Schlesinger
- Karl Striebeck as Bruno's father
