= Eberhard Junkersdorf =

German film producer

- Born: 27 September 1938 (age 87); Berlin, Germany
- Occupation: Film producer
- Years active: 1975–present

Hans-Eberhard Junkersdorf (born 27 September 1938) is a German film producer. He has produced more than 50 films since 1975. He was a member of the jury at the 38th Berlin International Film Festival.

== Selected filmography ==
- Room 13 (1964)
- Coup de Grâce (1976)
- Knife in the Head (1978)
- Germany in Autumn (1978)
- The Candidate (1980)
- Marianne and Juliane (1981)
- Sheer Madness (1983)
- Rosa Luxemburg (1986)
- Blue Eyed (1989)
- The Gamblers (1990)
- The Voyager (1992)
- The Promise (1995)
- The Fearless Four (1997)
- Desire (2000)
- Angst (2003)
