= Margarethe von Trotta =

German film director

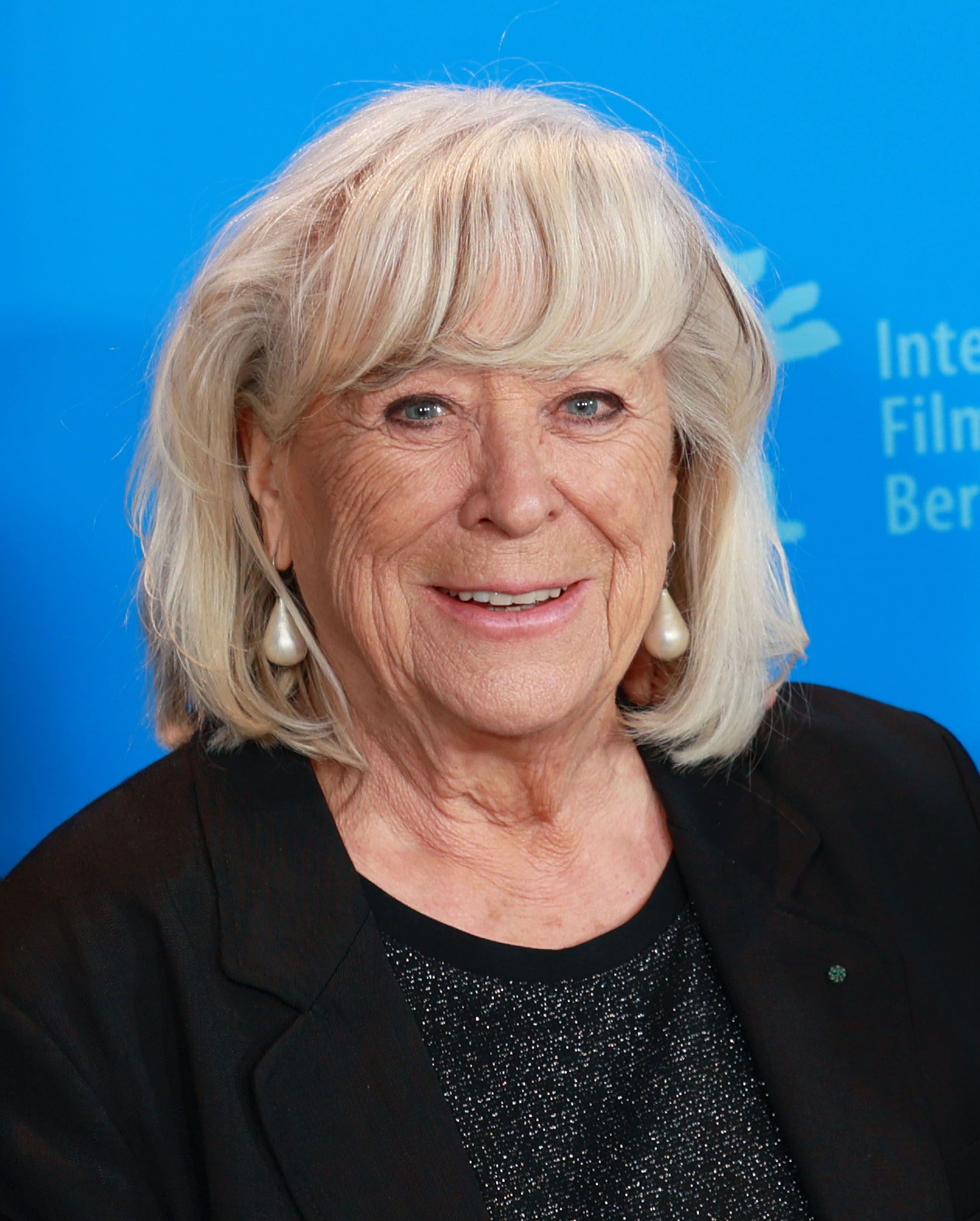
- Margarethe von Trotta at the 2023 Berlinale
- Born: February 21, 1942 (age 84); Berlin, Germany
- Occupations: Film director; screenwriter; actress
- Years active: 1968–present
- Movement: New German Cinema (1971–1991)
- Children: Felix Moeller

Margarethe von Trotta (German: [maʁɡaˈʁeːtə fɔn ˈtʁɔta]; born 21 February 1942) is a German film director, screenwriter, and actress. She has been referred to as a "leading force" of the New German Cinema movement. Von Trotta's extensive body of work has won awards internationally. She was married to and collaborated with director Volker Schlöndorff. Although they made a successful team, von Trotta felt she was seen as secondary to Schlöndorff. Subsequently, she established a solo career for herself and became "Germany's foremost female film director, who has offered the most sustained and successful female variant of Autorenkino in postwar German film history". Certain aspects of von Trotta's work have been compared to Ingmar Bergman's features from the 1960s and 1970s.

Von Trotta has been called "the world's leading feminist filmmaker". The predominant aim of her films is to create new representations of women. Her films are concerned with relationships between and among women (sisters, best friends, etc.), as well as with relationships between women and men, and include political settings. Nevertheless, she rejects the suggestion that she makes "women's films".

She is a recipient of one Golden Lion at Venice Film Festival, two David di Donatello Awards, Gold Hugo Award at Chicago International Film Festival, Lifetime Achievement Award at European Film Award, Lifetime Achievement Award at German Film Awards, two Palme d'Or nominations at Cannes Film Festival, and numerous other awards and nominations.

== Early life ==
The child of Elisabeth von Trotta and painter Alfred Roloff, Margarethe von Trotta was born in Berlin. She and her mother moved to Düsseldorf after the end of World War II. Von Trotta shared a strong bond with her mother in the absence of her father. She has spoken about how her relationship with her mother gave her a sensitivity for friendships and solidarity between women, a theme that is seen in most of her films.

== Career ==
Von Trotta relocated to Paris in the 1960s, where she worked for film collectives, collaborating on scripts and co-directing short films.

In her early career, von Trotta was an actress, appearing in the early films of directors Rainer Werner Fassbinder and Volker Schlöndorff. In one of many interviews, von Trotta said: "I came from Germany before the New Wave, so we had all these silly movies. Cinema for me was entertainment, but it was not art. When I came to Paris, I saw several films of Ingmar Bergman, and all of the sudden I understood what cinema could be. I saw the films of Alfred Hitchcock and the French Nouvelle Vague. I stood there and said, 'that is what I'd like to do with my life.' But that was 1962, and you couldn't think that a woman could be a director. In a way, as an unconscious act, I started acting and when the New German films started, I tried to get in through acting." Through her acting career, von Trotta was able to create an initial name for herself before becoming a director.

Her first input on a film, before making a solo-career out of it, was on Volker Schlöndorff's The Sudden Wealth of the Poor People of Kombach(1971), which she also acted in. In 1975, they proceeded to co-write and co-direct The Lost Honor of Katharina Blum (Die verlorene Ehre der Katharina Blum) which was based on an adaptation of Heinrich Böll's novel that dealt with "political repression in the Federal Republic". Within this first film of von Trotta's, one can see the conflict "between the personal and the public" that resonates throughout her early film career. The female characters within the story must occupy suffocating spaces that von Trotta uses to represent the confinement that women are subjected to in a world run by men. Von Trotta was in charge of supervising the performance aspect while Schlöndorff dealt with the film's mechanics. As a director, he was not considered to be very audacious, while von Trotta's strong suit was in how she directed the film's actors "through whom she creates her story". Thus the two were able to complement each other. Their film was considered to be "the most successful German film of the mid-1970s". The couple collaborated on one more film, Coup de Grâce (1976), where von Trotta helped to write but not direct the work, before she branched off into her own career.

Trotta's first solo film was The Second Awakening of Christa Klages (Das zweite Erwachen der Christa Klages) in 1978, which focused on "a young woman's political radicalization." This film presented multiple subjects that von Trotta's films would be known for in the future: "female bonding, sisterhood, and the uses and effects of violence". The film's script used real-life information about the seizure of school teacher Margit Czenki from Munich.

Throughout her years of filmmaking, von Trotta has addressed many points of special concern to women: "abortion, contraception, the situation of women at work, spousal abuse, and [the] traditional female role".

In 2001 she was the president of the jury at the 23rd Moscow International Film Festival.

She is a professor of film at the European Graduate School in Saas-Fee and remains an important personality of German cinema.

=== The Sister Films ===
Margarethe von Trotta's second feature film was Sisters, or the Balance of Happiness (Schwestern oder die Balance des Glücks, 1979). Unintentionally, she created a "trilogy of sister films" with her succeeding works: Marianne and Juliane (Die Bleierne Zeit, 1981) and Three Sisters (Fürchten und Lieben, 1988). Barbara Quart, author of the book Women Directors, commented on the three works: "It is the quest for wholeness that is the preoccupation of von Trotta's entire sister series." The women in these films are born into a traditional time (late 1940s and '50s), but they reject the positions that society has established for women. As well, the topic of suicide plays an important role in the first two films and how the live sister connects to the dead one. These three films investigate sisterhood and their bonds within a world that is falling apart all around them; this matter places von Trotta's work into New German Cinema.

Sisters, or The Balance of Happiness delves into bonds, both physically and mentally, between sisters Maria and Anna, along with a third party. The siblings are close before Anna commits suicide, but hidden behind her facial expressions is a desire to escape this feeling of frustration between following what she wants and what Maria asks of her. Maria faces post suicide trauma, coping with her devastation by transplanting the memory of her sister onto her co-worker, Miriam. This ultimately leads Maria to deal with her inner issues so she can try to move on with her life in a peaceful manner. This film garnered the Grand Prix Award at Créteil International Women's Film Festival in 1981.

Marianne and Juliane (also known in English as The German Sisters) (1981) also deals with losing a sister and learning how to handle the grief. Marianne and Juliane grow much closer after Marianne is put behind bars for her radical, terrorist activities. After unexpected news of Marianne's death, Juliane becomes obsessed with finding out the truth behind the supposed suicide, which she does not believe to be true. The characters are based on the real-life Christiane and Gudrun Ensslin, which made "feminist critics" give extra notice to this work in comparison to all other films that von Trotta has done. Critics question the way von Trotta structured the plot and why she positioned it from that of Christiane's character, Juliane, instead of from Gudrun (Marianne). The film is characterized by the use of multiple flashback sequences, jumping between present day to childhood and everywhere in between, breaking any chance of a linear structure. In this film, it is predominantly the Nazi era that influences Marianne and Juliane, albeit in different ways.

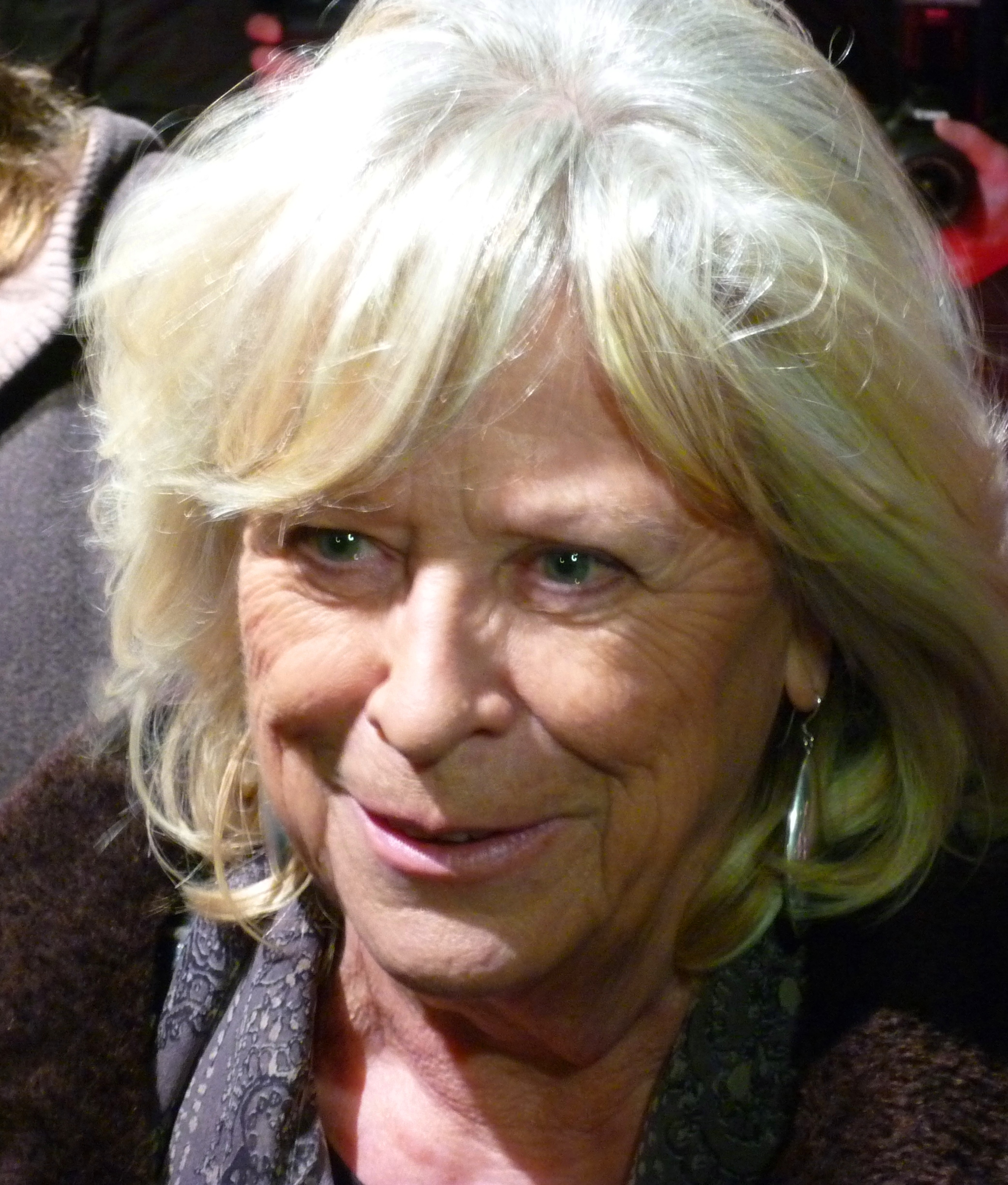
Margarethe von Trotta (January 2013)

A theme within Marianne and Juliane that von Trotta uses throughout her works is that of "the personal is political". In Marianne's jail cell, the sisters come to terms with "their personal and political differences". One take on this theme is that Marianne's personal past has fostered her political, terrorist present. In the story's present day, her political actions effect her personal life: she is sentenced to prison and dies in her cell, her husband takes his own life, and her son is put in danger. Not surprisingly, this film was the subject of much debate from conservatives who believed that Marianne's character as a terrorist was given too much understanding. This film won the AGIS Award, FIPRESCI Prize, Golden Lion Award, New Cinema Award, and OCIC Award at the Venice Film Festival in 1981, along with a few more listed in the awards section. Von Trotta winning the Golden Lion was a true achievement for women in film, for an honor of this stature had not been awarded to a female director since Leni Reifenstahl received "the Mussolini Cup" in 1938 for Olympia. In 1994 Ingmar Bergman listed it as one of his favorite 11 films of all time.

Love and Fear or Paura e amore (in Italy), also known as Trois Soeurs (in France) or Three Sisters (1988) – von Trotta's sixth feature-length film – focuses on a set of three sisters: Olga, Masha, and Irina. It is through these females that von Trotta is able to present her opinions concerning the stature of females in society and the traditional politics of the time that play a role in shaping their lives. Once again, this film deals with sisters who yearn for significance in all aspects of their lives (Rueschmann, 168). Their constant quest for love is the way they cope with the unfavorable aspects of life. Compared to the other two preceding films in the "sister series", Love and Fear contains key melodramatic elements that focus on one's feelings and anguish. It does not address politics as heavily as the other films, but more on von Trotta's take of the distinction between men and women in society. This film was nominated for the Palme d'Or Award at the Cannes Film Festival in 1988.

=== Sheer Madness ===
Sheer Madness (Heller Wahn, 1983), one of von Trotta's popular feature films, also uses suicide as an important part of the storyline. An analysis on the film given by authors Susan Linville and Kent Casper reads: "suicidal states of mind may stem not from negative distortions of external reality, but from an accurate assessment of the way things are." Within this story, once again, women's feelings are investigated through the friendship between two females, Ruth and Olga. This film gave the impression that, supposedly, von Trotta was a "man-hater." Von Trotta won the OCIC Award-Honorable Mention at the Berlin International Film Festival in the Forum of New Cinema for Sheer Madness in 1983. This film was also nominated for the Golden Bear at the Berlin International Film Festival in the same year.

=== Rosa Luxemburg ===
Von Trotta's 1986 eponymous film about the marxist socialist Rosa Luxemburg examines both her "life as a public revolutionary and her private experience as a woman". Barbara Sukowa, who stars in several of von Trotta's films, won the Best Actress honors at Cannes in 1986 for her delivery of the main role. Through her cinematic vision, von Trotta returns to the theme of "the political and the personal", giving fair attention to both Luxemburg's personal life as a female in society and her political life as a "public revolutionary". Rosa Luxemburg was nominated for the Palme d'Or at Cannes Film Festival in 1986. This film won the Guild Film Award-Gold at the Guild of German Art House Cinemas in German Film in 1987.

=== Rosenstrasse ===
Looking forward to some of von Trotta's more contemporary films, this same idea of female bonds and their emotions is still center stage, such as in her piece from 2003, Rosenstrasse. The film uses melodramatic elements, like in Paura e amore (1988), to express the emotions of the characters. The difference here is that Rosenstrasse is a "maternal melodrama." There are three overlapping familial connections involving "mother-daughter relationships" within the story: "the bond between Hannah, a first-generation Jewish American, and her mother Ruth"; "the...mother-daughter bond between Ruth and her Jewish mother Miriam"; "and...the central relationship between surrogate mother Lena von Eschenbach/Fisher and Ruth." In this, the definition of a mother is stretched from the "biological" standpoint to the "symbolic."

=== Vision ===
The film Vision (2009) chronicles the true tale of Hildegard von Bingen, a nun who stands for another of von Trotta's independent women protagonists—one who fights the patriarchal society of the church by foregoing the established rules of conduct and, upon learning one of her fellow sisters is with child, asks for a different area for the nuns to call their own. In an interview between von Trotta and Damon Smith from Filmmaker Magazine, von Trotta explains her choice for the subject of her film: "When I'm searching for a woman in the very distant past, I look for a woman who is in a way near to my own vision...I am always attracted by a woman who has to fight for her own life and her own reality, who has to get out of a certain situation of imprisonment, to free [herself]. That is perhaps the main theme in all my films."

Again, a deep bond is witnessed in this story, as in the rest of von Trotta's films, between Hildegard and a young nun, Richardis. Continuing with the interview, von Trotta says, "It's not a lesbian love! At one point she [Hildegard] says, ‘She is my mother and I'm her mother, I'm her daughter and she's my daughter.’ Hildegard couldn't have children, so in a way Richardis is her daughter and friend and mother [all at once]; it's a very deep love."

Von Trotta wanted to make a film with a female protagonist that viewers could relate to instead of looking at her from below, as she clarifies in an interview with Zeitgeist Films:

The figures that appeal to me are always strong women who also have moments of weakness; therefore, I never try to make heroines out of them. Instead I show how they fought to find their own way, how they put themselves out there, and how much they had to swallow in order to find themselves. I am fascinated by how they overcome obstacles in order to achieve their goals. Hildegard von Bingen had a dream of founding her own abbey, and she suffered a lot of setbacks in the process. The moments of her greatest weakness are when the nun Richardis is to be taken away from her. In this situation, she behaves either like a small, abandoned child, or with fury. This conduct is all recorded in her letters. And it is precisely these moments of extreme self-abandonment that I find so beautiful, surprising, and contradictory. Hildegard von Bingen demands for herself what she usually gives to others. I absolutely did not want to portray her as a saint.

=== Hannah Arendt ===
Hannah Arendt (2012) portrays an important segment in the life of the German-Jewish academic Hannah Arendt. In an interview with Thilo Wydra, von Trotta is asked if Arendt is similar to the women she has portrayed in past films. Von Trotta replies with an explanation about how real-life characters from her past films, Rosa Luxemburg and Die bleierne Zeit (Marianne and Juliane), fought and died for causes they found to be right: Luxemburg wanted more equality in her community, and Gudrun Ensslin (Marianne) wanted to revolutionize humanity. Von Trotta says, "Hannah Arendt is a woman who fits into my personal mold of historically important women that I have portrayed in my films. ‘I want to understand,’ was one of her guiding principles. I feel that applies to myself and my films as well.

=== Television work ===
The common problem that filmmakers run into is budget issues and where they get their funds; during the mid-eighties, many films went under due to money cuts by the "German subvention system." Several of von Trotta's fellow women filmmakers took the safe route and went into the education field in media. But not Margarethe von Trotta—to stay in the game, she accepted proposals for TV pieces, even if it meant losing a bit of her artistic allowances. Her first piece for television was Winterkind (1997), which was the first time she did not compose the screenplay for a work she was directing. She followed this with three more TV films: At Fifty Men Kiss Differently (1997), Days of Darkness (1997), and Anniversaries (2000). Through her experience of working in television, von Trotta learned how to try to hold on to her stamp as an "independent filmmaker" in terms of keeping her artistic approach.

== Personal life ==
In 1964, von Trotta married Jürgen Moeller and had one son, German documentary director Felix Moeller. They divorced in 1968 and von Trotta married German filmmaker Volker Schlöndorff. Together, they raised Felix and worked together on film projects.

Von Trotta and Schlöndorff's film collaboration in Germany during the politically turbulent 1970s is documented in Felix's 2018 film Sympathisanten: Unser Deutscher Herbst ("Sympathizers: our German Autumn").

== Filmography ==
=== Feature films ===
Year	Title	Role	Notes
1975	The Lost Honour of Katharina Blum (Die verlorene Ehre der Katharina Blum)		
1978	The Second Awakening of Christa Klages (Das zweite Erwachen der Christa Klages)		
1979	Sisters, or the Balance of Happiness (Schwestern oder die Balance des Glücks)	Screenplay, Director	
1981	Marianne and Juliane (Die bleierne Zeit)		Also known by the English title of The German Sisters
1983	Sheer Madness (Heller Wahn)		
1986	Rosa Luxemburg	Director	
	Anthology film. Segment "Eva"		
1988	Love and Fear (Fürchten und Lieben / Paura e amore)		Also known as Three Sisters or Trois Soeurs in French
1990	The African Woman (Die Rückkehr / L'africana)		
1993	The Long Silence (Zeit des Zorns / Il lungo silenzio)		
1995	The Promise (Das Versprechen)	Director	
2003	Rosenstrasse	Director	
2006	I Am the Other Woman (Ich bin die Andere)		
2009	Vision (Vision – Aus dem Leben der Hildegard von Bingen)		
2012	Hannah Arendt	Writer, director	
2015	The Misplaced World (Die abhandene Welt)		
2017	Forget About Nick	Director	
2018	Searching for Ingmar Bergman	Writer, director	Documentary
2023	Ingeborg Bachmann – Journey into the Desert	Writer, director	

=== Television films and series ===
Year	Title	Notes
2012	Mai per amore: La fuga di Teresa	TV series episode
2010	Die Schwester	TV film
2007	Tatort: Unter uns	TV series episode
2004	Die andere Frau (The Other Woman )	TV film
2000	Anniversaries	
1999	Days of Darkness	TV miniseries
1998	At Fifty Men Kiss Differently	TV film
1997	Winterkind	TV film

=== Actress ===
Year	Title	Role	Notes
1984	Bluebeard (TV film)	Jutta	
1977	Bierkampf		
1976	Coup de Grâce	Sophie von Reval	
1976	Das Andechser Gefühl	Movie star	
1976	Die Atlantikschwimmer	Swimming instructor	
1974	Stayover in Tyrol (TV film)	Katja	
1973	Desaster (TV film)	Ulla Werther	
1972	A Free Woman	Elisabeth Junker	Also, Screenplay
1972	The Morals of Ruth Halbfass	Doris Vogelsang	
1971	Warnung vor einer heiligen Nutte	Babs	
1971	The Sudden Wealth of the Poor People of Kombach	Sophie	
1970	The American Soldier	Chambermaid	
1970	Gods of the Plague	Margarethe	
1970	Baal (TV film)	Sophie	
1969	The Arsonists (TV film)	Anka	
1969	If You Play with Crazy Birds	Helga	
1967	Tränen trocknet der Wind…	Gaby	

== Awards and nominations ==
Year	Award	Category	Work	Result	Notes
2022	European Film Awards	Lifetime Achievement Award		Won	
2019	German Film Awards	Honorary Lifetime Award		Won	
2013	Germany's Art House Cinema Owners Association AG Kino	Gilde Film Prize	Hannah Arendt	Won	
2012	Leo Baeck Medal			Won	
2004	Taormina International Film Festival	Taormina Arte Award		Won	
2004	Hessian Film Awards	Honorary Award		Won	
2004	David di Donatello Awards	Best European Film	Rosenstrasse (2003)	Won	
2004	Golden Globes, Italy	Best European Film	Rosenstrasse (2003)	Won	
2003	Venice Film Festival	Golden Lion	Rosenstrasse (2003)	Nominated	
2003	Venice Film Festival	SIGNIS Award	Rosenstrasse (2003)	Honorable Mention	
2001	Biarritz International Festival of Audiovisual Programming	TV series and Serials	Anniversaries (2000)	Special Mention	
2000	Golden Camera, Germany	Audience Camera Award	Days of Darkness (1999, TV)	Won	
1995	Guild of German Art House Cinemas	Guild Film Award-Gold	The Promise (1995)	Won	
1995	Bavarian Film Awards	Best Direction	The Promise (1995)	Won	
1994	Flaiano International Prizes in Cinema	Career Award		Won	
1993	Montreal World Film Festival	Most Popular Film and Prize of the Ecumenical Jury	Il Lungo Silenzio (1993)	Won	
1989	German Film Awards	Special Film Award '40th Anniversary of the Federal Republic of Germany'	Marianne and Juliane (1981)	Won	
1988	Cannes Film Festival	Palme d'Or	Love and Fear (1988)	Nominated	
1987	Guild of German Art House Cinemas	Guild Film Award - Gold	Rosa Luxemburg (1986)	Won	
1986	Cannes Film Festival	Palme d'Or	Rosa Luxemburg (1986)	Nominated	
1983	Berlin International Film Festival	Golden Bear	Sheer Madness (1983)	Nominated	
1983	Berlin International Film Festival	OCIC Award	Sheer Madness (1983)	Honorable Mention	
1982	David di Donatello Awards	Best Foreign Film	Marianne and Juliane (1981)	Nominated	
1982	David di Donatello Awards	Best Foreign Director	Marianne and Juliane (1981)	Won	
1982	David di Donatello Awards	Best Screenplay	Marianne and Juliane (1981)	Nominated	
1981	Venice Film Festival	Golden Lion	Marianne and Juliane (1981)	Won	
1981	Valladolid International Film Festival		Marianne and Juliane (1981)	Honorable Mention	
1981	Créteil International Women's Film Festival	Grand Prix Award	Sisters, or The Balance of Happiness (1979)	Won	
1981	Gold Hugo	Chicago International Film Festival	The German Sisters (Die bleierne Zeit)	Won	
1972	German Critics Association Awards in Film	Critics Award		Won	
