= List of biographical films of the 2000s =

The following is a list of biographical films released during the 2000s.

== 2000 ==
Film	Subject(s)	Lead actor or actress
The Audrey Hepburn Story	Audrey Hepburn	Jennifer Love Hewitt
Beat	Joan Vollmer	Courtney Love
Beat	William S. Burroughs	Kiefer Sutherland
Beat	Lucien Carr	Norman Reedus
Beat	Allen Ginsberg	Ron Livingston
Before Night Falls	Reinaldo Arenas	Javier Bardem
Best	George Best	John Lynch
The King Is Dancing	Jean-Baptiste Lully	Boris Terral
The King Is Dancing	Louis XIV	Benoît Magimel
The Beach Boys: An American Family	The Beach Boys	Multiple actors
Chopper	Mark Brandon "Chopper" Read	Eric Bana
The Courage To Love	Henriette DeLille	Vanessa L. Williams
The Crossing	George Washington	Jeff Daniels
Dark Prince: The True Story of Dracula	Vlad the Impaler	Rudolf Martin
The David Cassidy Story	David Cassidy	Andrew Kavovit
The David Cassidy Story	Shirley Jones	Dey Young
Daydream Believers: The Monkees Story	The Monkees	Multiple Actors
Dr. Babasaheb Ambedkar	B. R. Ambedkar	Mammootty
Erin Brockovich	Erin Brockovich	Julia Roberts
The Farewell	Bertolt Brecht	Josef Bierbichler I'll
For Love or Country: The Arturo Sandoval Story	Arturo Sandoval	Andy Garcia
Hendrix	Jimi Hendrix	Wood Harris
I Dreamed of Africa	Kuki Gallmann	Kim Basinger
In His Life: The John Lennon Story	John Lennon	Philip McQuillan Phoenix
In the Light of the Moon	Ed Gein	Steve Railsback
Isn't She Great	Jacqueline Susann	Bette Midler
Jackie Bouvier Kennedy Onassis	Jacqueline Kennedy Onassis	Joanne Whalley
Joe Gould's Secret	Joe Gould	Ian Holm
Joseph: King of Dreams	Joseph	Ben Affleck (voice)
Little Richard	Little Richard	Leon Robinson
Lumumba	Patrice Lumumba	Eriq Ebouaney
Men of Honor	Carl Brashear	Cuba Gooding Jr.
Murderous Maids	Christine and Lea Papin	Sylvie Testud
Murderous Maids	Christine and Lea Papin	Julie-Marie Parmentier
Nora	Nora Barnacle	Susan Lynch
Nora	James Joyce	Ewan McGregor
One Hundred Steps	Giuseppe Impastato	Luigi Lo Cascio
Pandaemonium	William Wordsworth	John Hannah
Pandaemonium	Samuel Taylor Coleridge	Linus Roache
Paul the Apostle	Paul of Tarsus	Johannes Brandrup
Perfect Murder, Perfect Town	Lou Smit	Kris Kristofferson
Pollock	Jackson Pollock	Ed Harris
Quills	Marquis de Sade	Geoffrey Rush
Rated X	Artie Jay Mitchell	Charlie Sheen
Rated X	James Lloyd "Jim" Mitchell	Emilio Estevez
Remember the Titans	Herman Boone	Denzel Washington
Ricky 6	Ricky Kasso	Vincent Kartheiser
Steal This Movie!	Abbie Hoffman	Vincent D'Onofrio
Steal This Movie!	Anita Hoffman	Janeane Garofalo
The Three Stooges	Moe Howard	Paul Ben-Victor
The Three Stooges	Larry Fine	Evan Handler
The Three Stooges	Curly Howard	Michael Chiklis
The Three Stooges	Shemp Howard	John Kassir
Vatel	François Vatel	Gérard Depardieu
Word and Utopia	António Vieira	Lima Duarte
Take Me Home: The John Denver Story	John Denver	Chad Lowe

== 2001 ==
Film	Subject(s)	Lead actor or actress
61*	Roger Maris	Barry Pepper
61*	Mickey Mantle	Thomas Jane
The Affair of the Necklace	Jeanne de Valois-Saint-Rémy	Hilary Swank (older); Hayden Panettiere (young)
Ali	Muhammad Ali	Will Smith
As̅oka	Ashoka	Shah Rukh Khan
Ayyam El Sadat	Anwar Al Sadat	Ahmad Zaki
A Beautiful Mind	John Nash	Russell Crowe
Blow	George Jung	Johnny Depp
Bojangles	Bill Robinson	Gregory Hines
Brian's Song	Brian Piccolo	Sean Maher
Brian's Song	Gale Sayers	Mekhi Phifer
Bride of the Wind	Alma Mahler	Sarah Wynter
Bride of the Wind	Gustav Mahler	Jonathan Pryce
The Cat's Meow	Marion Davies	Kirsten Dunst
The Cat's Meow	William Randolph Hearst	Edward Herrmann
Child Star: The Shirley Temple Story	Shirley Temple	Emily Hart (older)
Child Star: The Shirley Temple Story	Shirley Temple	Ashley Rose Orr (young)
The Days of Sadat	Anwar Sadat	Ahmed Zaki
The Diaries of Vaslav Nijinsky	Vaslav Nijinsky	Derek Jacobi
The Gaul	Vercingetorix	Christopher Lambert
Haven	Ruth Gruber	Natasha Richardson
A Huey P. Newton Story	Huey P. Newton	Roger Guenveur Smith
Hysteria - The Def Leppard Story	Def Leppard	Multiple Actors
In the Time of the Butterflies	Minerva Mirabal	Salma Hayek
Iris	Iris Murdoch	Judi Dench (older)
Iris	Iris Murdoch	Kate Winslet (young)
James Dean	James Dean	James Franco
Like Mother, Like Son: The Strange Story of Sante & Kenny Kimes	Sante Kimes	Mary Tyler Moore
Like Mother, Like Son: The Strange Story of Sante & Kenny Kimes	Kenny Kimes	Gabriel Olds
Mad Love	Joanna of Castile	Pilar López de Ayala
Mad Love	Philip I of Castile	Daniele Liotti
The Moving True Story of a Woman Ahead of Her Time	Nienke van Hichtum	Monic Hendrickx
The Moving True Story of a Woman Ahead of Her Time	Pieter Jelles Troelstra	Jeroen Willems
The Other Side of Heaven	John H. Groberg	Christopher Gorham
Piñero	Miguel Piñero	Benjamin Bratt
Riding in Cars with Boys	Beverly Donofrio	Drew Barrymore
Taurus	Vladimir Lenin	Leonid Mozgovoy
Too Legit: The MC Hammer Story	MC Hammer	Romany Malco
Der Tunnel	Hasso Herschel	Heino Ferch

== 2002 ==
Film	Subject(s)	Lead actor or actress
24 Hour Party People	Tony Wilson	Steve Coogan
Adaptation	Charlie Kaufman	Nicolas Cage
Adaptation	Susan Orlean	Meryl Streep
Amen.	Kurt Gerstein	Ulrich Tukur
Antwone Fisher	Antwone Q. Fisher	Derek Luke (adult)
Antwone Fisher	Antwone Q. Fisher	Malcolm David Kelley (child)
Auto Focus	Bob Crane	Greg Kinnear
Bertie and Elizabeth	George VI	James Wilby
Bertie and Elizabeth	Queen Elizabeth the Queen Mother	Juliet Aubrey
Catch Me If You Can	Frank Abagnale	Leonardo DiCaprio
Callas Forever	Maria Callas	Fanny Ardant
Champion	Kim Duk-koo	Yu Oh-seong
Chi-hwa-seon	Owon	Choi Min-sik
The Child I Never Was	Jürgen Bartsch	Tobias Schenke
Chopin: Desire for Love	Fryderyk Chopin	Piotr Adamczyk
Chopin: Desire for Love	George Sand	Danuta Stenka
Confessions of a Dangerous Mind	Chuck Barris	Sam Rockwell
Dahmer	Jeffrey Dahmer	Jeremy Renner
Evelyn	Desmond Doyle	Pierce Brosnan
Fidel	Fidel Castro	Víctor Huggo Martin
Francesco	Francis of Assisi	Raoul Bova
Frida	Frida Kahlo	Salma Hayek
Gada Meilin	Gada Meiren	Deligeer
The Gathering Storm	Winston Churchill	Albert Finney
Gilda Radner: It's Always Something	Gilda Radner	Jami Gertz
Gilda Radner: It's Always Something	Gene Wilder	Tom Rooney
Gleason	Jackie Gleason	Brad Garrett
Hell on Heels: The Battle of Mary Kay	Mary Kay Ash	Shirley MacLaine
The Hours	Virginia Woolf	Nicole Kidman
The Junction Boys	Bear Bryant	Tom Berenger
The Kid Stays in the Picture	Robert Evans	Robert Evans
Lapu-Lapu	Lapulapu	Lito Lapid
Lapu-Lapu	Ferdinand Magellan	Dante Rivero
The Legend of Bhagat Singh	Bhagat Singh	Ajay Devgan
The Life of Aleksis Kivi	Aleksis Kivi	Marko Tiusanen
Madame Satã	Madame Satã	Lázaro Ramos
The Man Who Saved Christmas	A.C. Gilbert	Jason Alexander
Martin and Lewis	Dean Martin	Jeremy Northam
Martin and Lewis	Jerry Lewis	Sean Hayes
The Matthew Shepard Story	Matthew Shepard	Shane Meier
Path to War	Lyndon B. Johnson	Michael Gambon
The Pianist	Władysław Szpilman	Adrien Brody
Prince William	Prince William	Jordan Frieda
The Rookie	Jim Morris	Dennis Quaid
The Rosa Parks Story	Rosa Parks	Angela Bassett
Safe Conduct	Jean Devaivre	Jacques Gamblin
Safe Conduct	Jean Aurenche	Denis Podalydès
The Soul Keeper	Sabina Spielrein	Emilia Fox
The Soul Keeper	Carl Gustav Jung	Iain Glen
Ted Bundy	Ted Bundy	Michael Reilly Burke

== 2003 ==
Film	Subject(s)	Lead actor or actress
America's Prince: The John F. Kennedy Jr. Story	John F. Kennedy Jr.	Kristoffer Polaha
America's Prince: The John F. Kennedy Jr. Story	Jackie Kennedy Onassis	Jacqueline Bisset
America's Prince: The John F. Kennedy Jr. Story	Carolyn Bessette Kennedy	Portia de Rossi
American Splendor	Harvey Pekar	Paul Giamatti
And Starring Pancho Villa as Himself	Pancho Villa	Antonio Banderas
BAADASSSSS!	Melvin Van Peebles	Mario Van Peebles
Behind the Camera: The Unauthorized Story of Three's Company	John Ritter	Bret Anthony
Behind the Camera: The Unauthorized Story of Three's Company	Suzanne Somers	Jud Tylor
Behind the Camera: The Unauthorized Story of Three's Company	Joyce DeWitt	Melanie Deanne Moore
Benedict Arnold: A Question of Honor	Benedict Arnold	Aidan Quinn
Benedict Arnold: A Question of Honor	George Washington	Kelsey Grammer
Blind Flight	John McCarthy	Linus Roache
Blind Flight	Brian Keenan	Ian Hart
A Date with Darkness: The Trial and Capture of Andrew Luster	Andrew Luster	Jason Gedrick
The Deal	Gordon Brown	David Morrissey
The Deal	Tony Blair	Michael Sheen
The Elizabeth Smart Story	Elizabeth Smart	Amber Marshall
Gacy	John Wayne Gacy	Mark Holton
Gods and Generals	Robert E. Lee	Robert Duvall
Gods and Generals	Stonewall Jackson	Stephen Lang
Gods and Generals	Joshua Chamberlain	Jeff Daniels
High Roller: The Stu Ungar Story	Stu Ungar	Michael Imperioli
Imperium: Augustus	Caesar Augustus	Peter O' Toole
The Lion in Winter	King Henry II	Patrick Stewart
The Lion in Winter	Eleanor of Aquitaine	Glenn Close
The Lost Prince	Prince John	Daniel Williams (young); Matthew James Thomas (older)
Lucy	Lucille Ball	Rachel York
Lucy	Desi Arnaz	Danny Pino
Luther	Martin Luther	Joseph Fiennes
The Manson Family	Charles Manson	Marcello Games
Maria Goretti	Maria Goretti	Martina Pinto
Martha, Inc.: The Story of Martha Stewart	Martha Stewart	Cybill Shepherd
Monster	Aileen Wuornos	Charlize Theron
Mother Teresa of Calcutta	Mother Teresa	Olivia Hussey
Ned Kelly	Ned Kelly	Heath Ledger
The Night We Called It a Day	Frank Sinatra	Dennis Hopper
Paradise Found	Paul Gauguin	Kiefer Sutherland
Party Monster	Michael Alig	Macaulay Culkin
The Pentagon Papers	Daniel Ellsberg	James Spader
Radio	James Robert "Radio" Kennedy	Cuba Gooding Jr.
Radio	Harold Jones	Ed Harris
The Reagans	Ronald Reagan	James Brolin
The Reagans	Nancy Reagan	Judy Davis
Remake	Zlatko Topčić	Ermin Bravo
Seabiscuit	Red Pollard	Tobey Maguire
Seabiscuit	Charles S. Howard	Jeff Bridges
Seabiscuit	Tom Smith	Chris Cooper
Shattered Glass	Stephen Glass	Hayden Christensen
Soldier's Girl	Barry Winchell	Troy Garity
Soldier's Girl	Calpernia Addams	Lee Pace
Soraya	Soraya Esfandiary-Bakhtiari	Anna Valle
Soraya	Shah Mohammad Reza Pahlavi	Erol Sander
Spy Sorge	Richard Sorge	Iain Glen
Stander	Andre Stander	Thomas Jane
Swimming Upstream	Tony Fingleton	Jesse Spencer
Sylvia	Sylvia Plath	Gwyneth Paltrow
Touching the Void	Joe Simpson	Brendan Mackey
Veronica Guerin	Veronica Guerin	Cate Blanchett
Wonderland	John Holmes	Val Kilmer

== 2004 ==
Film	Subject(s)	Lead actor or actress
Against the Ropes	Jackie Kallen	Meg Ryan
Aimee Semple McPherson	Aimee Semple McPherson	Mimi Michaels
Alexander	Alexander the Great	Colin Farrell
The Assassination of Richard Nixon	Samuel Byck	Sean Penn
The Aviator·	Howard Hughes	Leonardo DiCaprio
Beautiful Boxer	Parinya Charoenphol	Asanee Suwan
Behind the Camera: The Unauthorized Story of Charlie's Angels	Farrah Fawcett	Tricia Helfer
Behind the Camera: The Unauthorized Story of Charlie's Angels	Jaclyn Smith	Christina Chambers
Behind the Camera: The Unauthorized Story of Charlie's Angels	Kate Jackson	Lauren Stamile
Bettie Page: Dark Angel	Bettie Page	Paige Richards
Besieged: The Ned Kelly Story	Ned Kelly	Peter Fenton
Ned Kelly: The True Story	Ned Kelly	Peter Fenton
Beyond the Sea	Bobby Darin	Kevin Spacey
Bobby Jones: Stroke of Genius	Bobby Jones	Jim Caviezel
The Brooke Ellison Story	Brooke Ellison	Lacey Chabert & Vanessa Marano
Call Me: The Rise and Fall of Heidi Fleiss	Heidi Fleiss	Jamie-Lynn Sigler
3: The Dale Earnhardt Story	Dale Earnhardt	Barry Pepper
De-Lovely	Cole Porter	Kevin Kline
Downfall
Downfall	Adolf Hitler	Bruno Ganz
The Ninth Day	Father Jean Bernard	Ulrich Matthes
Finding Neverland	J. M. Barrie	Johnny Depp
Fighter in the Wind	Masutatsu Oyama	Yang Dong-geun
Friday Night Lights	Gary Gaines	Billy Bob Thornton
Friday Night Lights	James "Boobie" Miles	Derek Luke
Hawking	Stephen Hawking	Benedict Cumberbatch
Helter Skelter	Charles Manson	Jeremy Davies
Hidalgo	Frank Hopkins	Viggo Mortensen
Hotel Rwanda	Paul Rusesabagina	Don Cheadle
Ike: Countdown to D-Day	Dwight D. Eisenhower	Tom Selleck
Kinsey	Alfred Kinsey	Liam Neeson
The Libertine	John Wilmot, 2nd Earl of Rochester	Johnny Depp
The Life and Death of Peter Sellers	Peter Sellers	Geoffrey Rush
Man in the Mirror: The Michael Jackson Story	Michael Jackson	Flex Alexander
Miracle	Herb Brooks	Kurt Russell
Modigliani	Amedeo Modigliani	Andy García
The Motorcycle Diaries	Che Guevara	Gael García Bernal
The Motorcycle Diaries	Alberto Granado	Rodrigo de la Serna
Nero	Nero	Hans Matheson
My Nikifor	Nikifor	Krystyna Feldman
The Mystery of Natalie Wood	Natalie Wood	Justine Waddell (older); Elizabeth Rice (teen); Grace Fulton (young)
The Mystery of Natalie Wood	Robert Wagner	Michael Weatherly
The Mystery of Natalie Wood	Warren Beatty	Matthew Settle
The Passion of the Christ	Jesus	Jim Caviezel
Ray	Ray Charles	Jamie Foxx
Redemption: The Stan Tookie Williams Story	Stanley Tookie Williams	Jamie Foxx
Rikidōzan	Rikidōzan	Sul Kyung-gu
Khuni Shikder	Ershad Sikder	Shakib Khan
The Sea Inside	Ramon Sampedro	Javier Bardem
Something The Lord Made	Alfred Blalock	Alan Rickman
Something The Lord Made	Vivien Thomas	Mos Def
Stage Beauty	Edward Kynaston	Billy Crudup
Thérèse	Saint Thérèse of Lisieux	Lindsay Younce
The Blue Butterfly	Pete Carlton (Note: The character is based on David Marenger)	Marc Donato

== 2005 ==
Film	Subject(s)	Lead actor or actress
2 Filhos de Francisco	Zezé Di Camargo & Luciano	Márcio Kieling
2 Filhos de Francisco	Zezé Di Camargo & Luciano	Thiago Mendonça
Amber Frey: Witness for the Prosecution	Amber Frey	Janel Moloney
Amber Frey: Witness for the Prosecution	Scott Peterson	Nathan Anderson
Amber Frey: Witness for the Prosecution	Gloria Allred	Nora Dunn
Ambulance Girl	Jane Stern	Kathy Bates
Aurore	Aurore Gagnon	Marianne Fortier (older); Alice Morel-Michaud (young)
Behind the Camera: The Unauthorized Story of Mork & Mindy	Robin Williams	Chris Diamantopoulos
Behind the Camera: The Unauthorized Story of Mork & Mindy	Pam Dawber	Erinn Hayes
Blue Swallow	Park Kyung-won	Jang Jin-young
Bose – The Forgotten Hero	Subhas Chandra Bose	Sachin Khedekar
Capote	Truman Capote	Philip Seymour Hoffman
Charles Wesley: Hymns of Praise	Charles Wesley	John Jackman
Cinderella Man	James J. Braddock	Russell Crowe
Coach Carter	Ken Carter	Samuel L. Jackson
Désiré Landru	Henri Désiré Landru	Patrick Timsit
Dr. B. R. Ambedkar	B. R. Ambedkar	Vishnukanth B. J.
Domino	Domino Harvey	Keira Knightley
Fighting the Odds: The Marilyn Gambrell Story	Marilyn Gambrell	Jami Gertz
Gie	Soe Hok Gie	Nicholas Saputra
Good Night, and Good Luck	Edward R. Murrow	David Strathairn
The Great Raid	Henry Mucci	Benjamin Bratt
The Great Raid	Robert Prince	James Franco
The Great Raid	Margaret Utinsky	Connie Nielsen
The Greatest Game Ever Played	Francis Ouimet	Shia LaBeouf
The Hunt for the BTK Killer	Dennis Rader	Gregg Henry
Jarhead	Anthony Swofford	Jake Gyllenhaal
Joseph Smith: The Prophet of the Restoration	Joseph Smith	Nathan Mitchell
Kingdom of Heaven	Raymond III of Tripoli	Jeremy Irons
Lords of Dogtown	Stacy Peralta	John Robinson
Lords of Dogtown	Jay Adams	Emile Hirsch
Lords of Dogtown	Tony Alva	Victor Rasuk
Marathon	Cho-won	Cho Seung-woo
Martha: Behind Bars	Martha Stewart	Cybill Shepherd
Mrs. Harris	Jean Harris	Annette Bening
Mrs Henderson Presents	Laura Henderson	Judi Dench
Munich	Avner Kaufman	Eric Bana
Murder Unveiled	Jaswinder Kaur Sidhu	Anita Majumdar
My Family and Other Animals	Gerald Durrell	Eugene Simon
The New World	John Smith	Colin Farrell
The New World	Pocahontas	Q'orianka Kilcher
The Notorious Bettie Page	Bettie Page	Gretchen Mol
Pierrepoint	Albert Pierrepoint	Timothy Spall
The Prize Winner of Defiance, Ohio	Evelyn Ryan	Julianne Moore
The Queen's Sister	Princess Margaret	Lucy Cohu
Riot at the Rite	Vaslav Nijinsky	Adam Garcia
The Rising	Mangal Pandey	Aamir Khan
The Rocket	Maurice Richard	Roy Dupuis
See Arnold Run	Arnold Schwarzenegger	Roland Kickinger (young); Jurgen Prochnow (older)
Shania: A Life in Eight Albums	Shania Twain	Meredith Henderson (older); Shenae Grimes-Beech (teen); Reva Timbers (young)
Sophie Scholl – The Final Days	Sophie Scholl	Julia Jentsch
Stoned	Brian Jones	Leo Gregory
Imperium: Saint Peter	Saint Peter	Omar Sharif
The Sun	Emperor Hirohito	Issey Ogata
Trump Unauthorized	Donald Trump	Justin Louis
Waking Up Wally: The Walter Gretzky Story	Walter Gretzky	Tom McCamus
Waking Up Wally: The Walter Gretzky Story	Wayne Gretzky	Kristen Holden-Ried
Walk the Line	Johnny Cash	Joaquin Phoenix
Walk the Line	June Carter Cash	Reese Witherspoon
Warm Springs	Franklin D. Roosevelt	Kenneth Branagh
Warm Springs	Eleanor Roosevelt	Cynthia Nixon
The World's Fastest Indian	Burt Munro	Anthony Hopkins

== 2006 ==
Film	Subject(s)	Lead actor or actress
Albert Schweitzer: Called to Africa	Albert Schweitzer	Jeff McCarthy
Alien Autopsy	Ray Santilli	Declan Donnelly
Alien Autopsy	Gary Shoefield	Anthony McPartlin
Amazing Grace	William Wilberforce	Ioan Gruffudd
Amazing Grace	John Newton	Albert Finney
The Amazing Grace	John Newton	Nick Moran
Beau Brummell: This Charming Man	Beau Brummell	James Purefoy
The Black Dahlia	Elizabeth Short	Mia Kirshner
The Borgia	Rodrigo Borgia	Lluís Homar
The Borgia	Cesare Borgia	Sergio Peris-Mencheta
Catch a Fire	Patrick Chamusso	Derek Luke
Colour of the Cross	Jesus	Jean-Claude La Marre
Copying Beethoven	Ludwig van Beethoven	Ed Harris
The Death of Poe	Edgar Allan Poe	Mark Redfield
Driving Lessons	Jeremy Brock	Rupert Grint
El Benny	Benny Moré	Renny Arozarena
El Cantante	Héctor Lavoe	Marc Anthony
Elizabeth David: A Life in Recipes	Elizabeth David	Catherine McCormack
Factory Girl	Edie Sedgwick	Sienna Miller
Faith like Potatoes	Angus Buchan	Frank Rautenbach
The Fantasia Barrino Story: Life Is Not a Fairy Tale	Fantasia Barrino	Fantasia Barrino (older); Jamia Simone Nash (young)
Fearless	Huo Yuanjia	Jet Li
Find Me Guilty	Giacomo "Jackie" DiNorscio	Vin Diesel
The Flying Scotsman	Graeme Obree	Jonny Lee Miller
Fur: An Imaginary Portrait of Diane Arbus	Diane Arbus	Nicole Kidman
Gridiron Gang	Sean Porter	Dwayne Johnson
Gridiron Gang	Malcolm Moore	Xzibit
Glory Road	Don Haskins	Josh Lucas
The Good Shepherd	James Jesus Angleton	Matt Damon
Goya's Ghosts	Francisco Goya	Stellan Skarsgård
A Guide to Recognizing Your Saints	Dito Montiel	Robert Downey Jr. (older); Shia LaBeouf (young)
Halim	Abdel Halim Hafez	Ahmed Zaki (older); Haitham Ahmed Zaki (young)
Hannibal – Rome's Worst Nightmare	Hannibal	Alexander Siddig
Henry Dunant: Red on the Cross	Henry Dunant	Thomas Jouannet
Hollywoodland	George Reeves	Ben Affleck
Infamous	Truman Capote	Toby Jones
Invincible	Vince Papale	Mark Wahlberg
Karla	Karla Homolka	Laura Prepon
Karla	Paul Bernardo	Misha Collins
Klimt	Gustav Klimt	John Malkovich
The Last King of Scotland	Idi Amin	Forest Whitaker
Marie Antoinette	Marie Antoinette	Kirsten Dunst
Milarepa	Milarepa	Jamyang Lodro
Miss Potter	Beatrix Potter	Renée Zellweger
The Nativity Story	Mary of Nazareth	Keisha Castle-Hughes
The Nativity Story	Joseph of Nazareth	Oscar Isaac
One Night with the King	Esther	Tiffany Dupont
One Night with the King	Xerxes I of Persia	Luke Goss
Peaceful Warrior	Dan Millman	Scott Mechlowicz
Provoked	Kiranjit Ahluwalia	Aishwarya Rai
The Pursuit of Happyness	Christopher Gardner	Will Smith
Pushkin: The Last Duel	Alexander Pushkin	Sergei Bezrukov
The Queen	Queen Elizabeth II	Helen Mirren
Raising Jeffrey Dahmer	Jeffrey Dahmer	Rusty Sneary
Requiem	Anneliese Michel	Sandra Hüller
The Ron Clark Story	Ron Clark	Matthew Perry
Running with Scissors	Augusten Burroughs	Joseph Cross
Stan	Stan Laurel	Jim Norton (old), Nik Howden (young)
Stan	Oliver Hardy	Trevor Cooper (old), Mike Goodenough (young)
Take the Lead	Pierre Dulaine	Antonio Banderas
United 93	Mark Bingham	Cheyenne Jackson
United 93	Jeremy Glick	Peter Hermann
The Water Is Wide	Pat Conroy	Jeff Hephner
We Are Marshall	Jack Lengyel	Matthew McConaughey
Why I Wore Lipstick to My Mastectomy	Geralyn Lucas	Sarah Chalke
Wild Romance	Herman Brood	Daniël Boissevain
World Trade Center	John McLoughlin	Nicolas Cage
World Trade Center	Will Jimeno	Michael Peña

== 2007 ==
Film	Subject(s)	Lead actor or actress
American Gangster	Frank Lucas	Denzel Washington
An American Crime	Sylvia Likens	Elliot Page (Note: Credited as Ellen Page)
An American Crime	Gertrude Baniszewski	Catherine Keener
The Assassination of Jesse James by the Coward Robert Ford	Jesse James	Brad Pitt
The Assassination of Jesse James by the Coward Robert Ford	Robert Ford	Casey Affleck
Assembly	Gu Zidi	Zhang Hanyu
Becoming Jane	Jane Austen	Anne Hathaway
The Black Pimpernel	Harald Edelstam	Michael Nyqvist
Breach	Robert Hanssen	Chris Cooper
Charlie Wilson's War	Charlie Wilson	Tom Hanks
Clare and Francis	Clare of Assisi	Mary Petruolo
Clare and Francis	Francis of Assisi	Ettore Bassi
Control	Ian Curtis	Sam Riley
Colour Me Kubrick	Alan Conway	John Malkovich
The Counterfeiters	Salomon Smolianoff	Karl Markovics
Crazy	Hank Garland	Waylon Payne
Daphne	Daphne du Maurier	Geraldine Somerville
Dark Matter	Gang Lu	Liu Ye
Eight Miles High	Uschi Obermaier	Natalia Avelon
Diana: Last Days of a Princess	Diana, Princess of Wales	Genevieve O'Reilly
The Diving Bell and the Butterfly	Jean-Dominique Bauby	Mathieu Amalric
Ed Gein: The Butcher of Plainfield	Ed Gein	Kane Hodder
Eichmann	Adolf Eichmann	Thomas Kretschmann
El Greco	El Greco	Nick Ashdon
Elizabeth: The Golden Age	Elizabeth I	Cate Blanchett
Freedom Writers	Erin Gruwell	Hilary Swank
Gandhi, My Father	Mahatma Gandhi	Darshan Jariwala
Gandhi, My Father	Harilal Gandhi	Akshaye Khanna
Ganes	Remu Aaltonen	Eero Milonoff
Ganes	Albert Järvinen	Jussi Nikkilä
Ganes	Cisse Häkkinen	Olavi Uusivirta
Ganes	Ile Kallio	Timo Tikka
Genghis Khan: To the Ends of the Earth and Sea	Genghis Khan	Takashi Sorimachi
Georg	Georg Ots	Marko Matvere
Goodbye Bafana	James Gregory	Joseph Fiennes
Goodbye Bafana	Nelson Mandela	Dennis Haysbert
The Gray Man	Albert Fish	Patrick Bauchau
The Great Debaters	Melvin B. Tolson	Denzel Washington
The Great Debaters	James L. Farmer Sr.	Forest Whitaker
The Great Debaters	James Farmer	Denzel Whitaker
The Hoax	Clifford Irving	Richard Gere
Hwang Jin Yi	Hwang Jin Yi	Song Hye Kyo
I'm Not There	Bob Dylan	Christian Bale, Cate Blanchett, Heath Ledger, Marcus Carl Franklin, Richard Gere, Ben Whishaw.
Into The Wild	Christopher McCandless	Emile Hirsch
Jump!	Philippe Halsman	Ben Silverstone
The Killing of John Lennon	Mark David Chapman	Jonas Ball
The King	Graham Kennedy	Stephen Curry
La Vie En Rose	Édith Piaf	Marion Cotillard
The Passion Within	Manuel Laureano Rodríguez Sánchez	Adrien Brody
My Boy Jack	Jack Kipling	Daniel Radcliffe
Neal Cassady	Neal Cassady	Tate Donovan
A Mighty Heart	Mariane Pearl	Angelina Jolie
A Mighty Heart	Daniel Pearl	Dan Futterman
Miss Austen Regrets	Jane Austen	Olivia Williams
Mongol	Genghis Khan	Tadanobu Asano
Music Within	Richard Pimentel	Ron Livingston
My Father	Hwang Nam-cheol	Kim Yeong-cheol
Nightwatching	Rembrandt	Martin Freeman
Persepolis	Marjane Satrapi	Chiara Mastroianni (voice)
Pride	Jim Ellis	Terrence Howard
Rescue Dawn	Dieter Dengler	Christian Bale
Rise of the Footsoldier	Carlton Leach	Ricci Harnett
Romulus, My Father	Romulus Gaita	Eric Bana
Romulus, My Father	Raimond Gaita	Kodi Smit-McPhee
Ruffian	Frank Y. Whiteley Jr.	Sam Shepard
Shake Hands with the Devil	Roméo Dallaire	Roy Dupuis
The Singer	Héctor Lavoe	Raul Carbonell
Sybil	Shirley Ardell Mason	Tammy Blanchard
Talk to Me	Ralph "Petey" Greene	Don Cheadle
Tears of a King	Elvis Presley	Matt Lewis
Theresa: The Body of Christ	Saint Teresa of Ávila	Paz Vega
What We Do Is Secret	Darby Crash	Shane West
26 Years Diary	Lee Su-hyon	Lee Tae-sung
Zodiac	Robert Graysmith	Jake Gyllenhaal

== 2008 ==
Film	Subject(s)	Lead actor or actress
Admiral	Alexander Kolchak	Konstantin Habensky
Amália	Amália Rodrigues	Sandra Barata
Billy: The Early Years	Billy Graham	Armie Hammer
Bronson	Charles Bronson	Tom Hardy
Cadillac Records	Leonard Chess	Adrien Brody
Cadillac Records	Muddy Waters	Jeffrey Wright
Cadillac Records	Etta James	Beyoncé Knowles
Cass	Cass Pennant	Nonso Anozie
Céline	Céline Dion	Christine Ghawi (older)
Céline	Céline Dion	Jodelle Ferland (young)
Che	Che Guevara	Benicio del Toro
Changeling	Christine Collins	Angelina Jolie
Chapter 27	Mark David Chapman	Jared Leto
Coco Chanel	Coco Chanel	Shirley MacLaine (older); Barbora Bobuľová (young)
The Curse of Steptoe	Harry H. Corbett	Jason Isaacs
The Curse of Steptoe	Wilfrid Brambell	Phil Davis
Defiance	Tuvia Bielski	Daniel Craig
Defiance	Zus Bielski	Liev Schreiber
Der Baader Meinhof Komplex	Ulrike Meinhof	Martina Gedeck
Der Baader Meinhof Komplex	Andreas Baader	Moritz Bleibtreu
Der Baader Meinhof Komplex	Gudrun Ensslin	Johanna Wokalek
The Duchess	Georgiana Cavendish	Keira Knightley
The Easy Way	Albert Spaggiari	Jean-Paul Rouve
The Edge of Love	Dylan Thomas	Matthew Rhys
The Express: The Ernie Davis Story	Ernie Davis	Rob Brown
Flash of Genius	Robert Kearns	Greg Kinnear
Florence Nightingale	Florence Nightingale	Laura Fraser
Forever Enthralled	Mei Lanfang	Leon Lai
Front of the Class	Brad Cohen	James Wolk
Frost/Nixon	Richard Nixon	Frank Langella
Frost/Nixon	David Frost	Michael Sheen
Hansie	Hansie Cronje	Frank Rautenbach
Hunger	Bobby Sands	Michael Fassbender
Il Divo	Giulio Andreotti	Toni Servillo
Ip Man	Ip Man	Donnie Yen
Jodhaa Akbar	Akbar the Great	Hrithik Roshan
Jodhaa Akbar	Jodhabai	Aishwarya Rai
The Last Confession of Alexander Pearce	Alexander Pearce	Ciarán McMenamin
Little Ashes	Salvador Dalí	Robert Pattinson
Little Ashes	Federico García Lorca	Javier Beltrán
The Longshots	Jasmine Plummer	Keke Palmer
Mao's Last Dancer	Li Cunxin	Chi Cao
Max Manus	Max Manus	Aksel Hennie
Me and Orson Welles	Orson Welles	Christian McKay
Milk	Harvey Milk	Sean Penn
Mesrine: Killer Instinct	Jacques Mesrine	Vincent Cassel
Muhammad: The Final Legacy	Muhammad	
Meu Nome Não É Johnny	João Guilherme Estrella	Selton Mello
The Other Boleyn Girl	Mary Boleyn	Scarlett Johansson
The Other Boleyn Girl	Anne Boleyn	Natalie Portman
Phantom Punch	Sonny Liston	Ving Rhames
Public Enemy Number One	Jacques Mesrine	Vincent Cassel
Portrait of a Beauty	Sin Yun-bok	Kim Min-sun
The Red Baron	Manfred von Richthofen	Matthias Schweighöfer
Red Cliff	Zhou Yu	Tony Leung Chiu-Wai
Red Cliff	Zhuge Liang	Takeshi Kaneshiro
Red Cliff	Cao Cao	Zhang Fengyi
Sagan	Françoise Sagan	Sylvie Testud
Séraphine	Séraphine Louis	Yolande Moreau
Skin	Sandra Laing	Sophie Okonedo
Sugar	Miguel Santos	Algenis Perez Soto
A Tale of Water on the Southern Island	Yoichi Hatta	Kazuhiko Inoue (Voice)
Valkyrie	Col. Claus von Stauffenberg	Tom Cruise
Victor	Victor Davis	Mark Lutz
W.	George W. Bush	Josh Brolin
Waltz with Bashir	Ari Folman	Ari Folman (voice)

== 2009 ==
Film	Subject(s)	Lead actor or actress
Agora	Hypatia	Rachel Weisz
Albert Schweitzer	Albert Schweitzer	Jeroen Krabbé
The Damned United	Brian Clough	Michael Sheen
Amelia	Amelia Earhart	Hilary Swank
An Englishman in New York	Quentin Crisp	John Hurt
The Anna Nicole Smith Story	Anna Nicole Smith	Willa Ford
The Assailant	Manoel Henrique "Besouro Mangangá" Pereira	Aílton Carmo
Balibo	Roger East	Anthony LaPaglia
Balibo	José Ramos-Horta	Oscar Isaac
Berdella	Robert Berdella	Seth Correa
Berlin 36	Gretel Bergmann	Karoline Herfurth
Berlin 36	Marie Ketteler	Sebastian Urzendowsky
The Blind Side	Leigh Anne Tuohy	Sandra Bullock
The Blind Side	Sean Tuohy	Tim McGraw
The Blind Side	Michael Oher	Quinton Aaron
Bright Star	John Keats	Ben Whishaw
Bright Star	Fanny Brawne	Abbie Cornish
Coco Before Chanel	Coco Chanel	Audrey Tautou
Coco Chanel & Igor Stravinsky	Coco Chanel	Anna Mouglalis
Coco Chanel & Igor Stravinsky	Igor Stravinsky	Mads Mikkelsen
Connolly	James Connolly	Peter Mullan
The Consul of Sodom	Jaime Gil de Biedma	Jordi Mollà
The Countess	Countess Elizabeth Báthory	Julie Delpy
The Courageous Heart of Irena Sendler	Irena Sendler	Anna Paquin
Creation	Charles Darwin	Paul Bettany
Desert Flower	Waris Dirie	Liya Kebede
Enid	Enid Blyton	Helena Bonham Carter
Fortapàsc	Giancarlo Siani	Libero De Rienzo
Gifted Hands: The Ben Carson Story	Ben Carson	Cuba Gooding Jr.
Georgia O'Keeffe	Georgia O'Keeffe	Joan Allen
Goemon	Ishikawa Goemon	Yōsuke Eguchi
Grey Gardens	Edith Ewing Bouvier	Jessica Lange
Grey Gardens	Edith Bouvier Beale	Drew Barrymore
Hilde	Hildegard Knef	Heike Makatsch
The Informant!	Mark Whitacre	Matt Damon
Into the Storm	Winston Churchill	Brendan Gleeson
Invictus	Nelson Mandela	Morgan Freeman
Invictus	François Pienaar	Matt Damon
John Rabe	John Rabe	Ulrich Tukur
Julie & Julia	Julie Powell	Amy Adams
Julie & Julia	Julia Child	Meryl Streep
King Conqueror	Peter II of Aragon	Tim Roth
Kerala Varma Pazhassiraja	Pazhassi Raja	Mammootty
The Last Station	Leo Tolstoy	Christopher Plummer
Margaret	Margaret Thatcher	Lindsay Duncan
The Mighty Macs	Cathy Rush	Carla Gugino
Natalee Holloway	Natalee Holloway	Amy Gumenick
Natalee Holloway	Beth Twitty	Tracy Pollan
Natalee Holloway	Joran van der Sloot	Jacques Strydom
Notorious	Christopher "Notorious B.I.G." Wallace	Jamal Woolard
Nowhere Boy	John Lennon	Aaron Johnson
12 Paces Without a Head	Klaus Störtebeker	Ronald Zehrfeld
Pope Joan	Pope Joan	Johanna Wokalek
Princess Kaiulani	Kaʻiulani	Q'Orianka Kilcher
Public Enemies	John Dillinger	Johnny Depp
Public Enemies	Melvin Purvis	Christian Bale
Public Enemies	Billie Frechette	Marion Cotillard
Public Enemies	Baby Face Nelson	Stephen Graham
S&M Judge	Koen Aurousseau	Gene Bervoets
S&M Judge	Magda De Herdt	Veerle Dobbelaere
Sanctity Within Reach	Pier Giorgio Frassati	Christine M. Wohar
Schweitzer	Albert Schweitzer	Jeroen Krabbé
Sister Smile	Jeanine Deckers	Cécile de France
Skin	Sandra Laing	Sophie Okonedo
The Soloist	Steve Lopez	Robert Downey Jr.
The Soloist	Nathaniel Ayers	Jamie Foxx
Telstar	Joe Meek	Con O'Neill
Toussaint	Toussaint Louverture	Don Cheadle
Van Diemen's Land	Alexander Pearce	Oscar Redding
Vincere	Ida Dalser	Giovanna Mezzogiorno
Vincere	Benito Mussolini	Filippo Timi
Vision - From the Life of Hildegard von Bingen	Hildegard von Bingen	Barbara Sukowa
Wesley	John Wesley	Burgess Jenkins
Within the Whirlwind	Yevgenia Ginzburg	Emily Watson
The Young Victoria	Queen Victoria	Emily Blunt
Zen	Dōgen Zenji	Nakamura Kantarō II

== See also ==
- Lists of biographical films
