= List of biographical films of the 1980s =

The following is a list of biographical films released during the 1980s.

== 1980 ==
Film	Subject(s)	Lead actor or actress
Breaker Morant	Breaker Morant	Edward Woodward
Coal Miner's Daughter	Loretta Lynn	Sissy Spacek
The Elephant Man	John Merrick	John Hurt
Guyana Tragedy: The Story of Jim Jones	Jim Jones	Powers Boothe
Heart Beat	Neal Cassady	Nick Nolte
Heart Beat	Carolyn Cassady	Sissy Spacek
Heart Beat	Jack Kerouac	John Heard
Heaven's Gate	James "Jim" Averall	Kris Kristofferson
Heaven's Gate	Ellen Watson	Isabelle Huppert
Heaven's Gate	Nate Champion	Christopher Walken
The Hunter	Ralph "Papa" Thorson	Steve McQueen
Joni	Joni Eareckson Tada	Joni Eareckson Tada
Nijinsky	Vaslav Nijinsky	George de la Peña
The Ordeal of Dr. Mudd	Samuel Mudd	Dennis Weaver
Raging Bull	Jake LaMotta	Robert De Niro
The Secret of Nikola Tesla	Nikola Tesla	Petar Božović
A Time for Miracles	Elizabeth Ann Seton	Kate Mulgrew
Tom Horn	Tom Horn	Steve McQueen
Where the Buffalo Roam	Hunter S. Thompson	Bill Murray
Where the Buffalo Roam	Oscar Zeta Acosta	Peter Boyle

== 1981 ==
Film	Subject(s)	Lead actor or actress
Agony	Grigori Rasputin	Alexei Petrenko
Chariots of Fire	Harold Abrahams	Ben Cross
Chariots of Fire	Eric Liddell	Ian Charleson
Christiane F. – We Children from Bahnhof Zoo	Christiane F.	Natja Brunckhorst
Death of a Centerfold: The Dorothy Stratten Story	Dorothy Stratten	Jamie Lee Curtis
Death of a Centerfold: The Dorothy Stratten Story	Paul Snider	Bruce Weitz
Edo Porn	Hokusai	Ken Ogata
Edo Porn	Takizawa Bakin	Toshiyuki Nishida
Edo Porn	Katsushika Ōi	Yūko Tanaka
Egon Schiele – Exzess und Bestrafung	Egon Schiele	Mathieu Carrière
The Girl with the Red Hair	Hannie Schaft	Renée Soutendijk
Jacqueline Bouvier Kennedy	Jacqueline Kennedy	Jaclyn Smith
Lion of the Desert	Omar Mukhtar	Anthony Quinn
Mommie Dearest	Joan Crawford	Faye Dunaway
Mommie Dearest	Christina Crawford	Diana Scarwid
Peter and Paul	Paul of Tarsus	Anthony Hopkins
Peter and Paul	Peter the Fisherman	Robert Foxworth
Al Qadisiyya	Sa'd ibn Abi Waqqas	Ezzat El Alaili
Reds	John Reed	Warren Beatty
Rise and Fall of Idi Amin	Idi Amin	Joseph Olita
Stand By Your Man	Tammy Wynette	Annette O'Toole
Stand By Your Man	George Jones	Tim McIntire

== 1982 ==
Film	Subject(s)	Lead actor or actress
Macbeth	Macbeth of Scotland	György Cserhalmi
Flight of the Eagle	Salomon August Andrée	Max von Sydow
Frances	Frances Farmer	Jessica Lange
Gandhi	Mahatma Gandhi	Ben Kingsley
The Grey Fox	Bill Miner	Richard Farnsworth
Legend of a Fighter	Fok Yuen-kap	Bryan Leung
Mae West	Mae West	Ann Jillian
Missing	Charles Horman	John Shea
The Return of Martin Guerre	Arnaud du Tilh	Gérard Depardieu
The Return of Martin Guerre	Bertrande de Rols	Nathalie Baye
Rosie: The Rosemary Clooney Story	Rosemary Clooney	Sondra Locke
The Royal Romance of Charles and Diana	Charles, Prince of Wales	Christopher Baines
The Royal Romance of Charles and Diana	Diana, Princess of Wales	Catherine Oxenberg
The White Rose	Sophie Scholl	Lena Stolze
A Woman Called Golda	Golda Meir	Ingrid Bergman

== 1983 ==
Film	Subject(s)	Lead actor or actress
Adi Shankaracharya	Adi Shankara	Sarvadaman D. Banerjee
Banović Strahinja	Strahinja Banović	Franco Nero
Cross Creek	Marjorie Kinnan Rawlings	Mary Steenburgen
Champions	Bob Champion	John Hurt
Danton	Georges Danton	Gérard Depardieu
Dempsey	Jack Dempsey	Treat Williams
For Us the Living: The Medgar Evers Story	Medgar Evers	Howard Rollins
For Us the Living: The Medgar Evers Story	Myrlie Evers	Irene Cara
Grace Kelly	Grace Kelly	Cheryl Ladd
Heart Like a Wheel	Shirley Muldowney	Bonnie Bedelia
Kennedy	John F. Kennedy	Martin Sheen
Kennedy	Jacqueline Bouvier Kennedy	Blair Brown
Living Proof: The Hank Williams, Jr. Story	Hank Williams Jr.	Richard Thomas
The Right Stuff	Chuck Yeager	Sam Shepard
The Right Stuff	Gus Grissom	Fred Ward
The Right Stuff	Gordon Cooper	Dennis Quaid
The Right Stuff	John Glenn	Ed Harris
The Right Stuff	Alan Shepard	Scott Glenn
The Right Stuff	Wally Schirra	Lance Henriksen
The Right Stuff	Deke Slayton	Scott Paulin
Rita Hayworth: The Love Goddess	Rita Hayworth	Lynda Carter
Sadat	Anwar El Sadat	Louis Gossett Jr
The Scarlet and the Black	Hugh O'Flaherty	Gregory Peck
The Scarlet and the Black	Herbert Kappler	Christopher Plummer
Silkwood	Karen Silkwood	Meryl Streep
Star 80	Dorothy Stratten	Mariel Hemingway
Star 80	Paul Snider	Eric Roberts
The Terry Fox Story	Terry Fox	Eric Fryer
Wagner	Richard Wagner	Richard Burton

== 1984 ==
Film	Subject(s)	Lead actor or actress
Amadeus	Antonio Salieri	F. Murray Abraham
Amadeus	Wolfgang Amadeus Mozart	Tom Hulce
The Bounty	William Bligh	Anthony Hopkins
The Bounty	First Mate Fletcher Christian	Mel Gibson
The Jesse Owens Story	Jesse Owens	Dorian Harewood
The Killing Fields	Sydney Schanberg	Sam Waterston
The Killing Fields	Dith Pran	Haing S. Ngor
The Killing Fields	Jon Swain	Julian Sands
The Miracle Continues	Helen Keller	Mare Winningham
Puccini	Giacomo Puccini	Robert Stephens
Samson and Delilah	Samson	Max von Sydow
Samson and Delilah	Delilah	Belinda Bauer

== 1985 ==
Film	Subject(s)	Lead actor or actress
Christopher Columbus	Christopher Columbus	Gabriel Byrne
Colonel Redl	Alfred Redl	Klaus Maria Brandauer
Dance with a Stranger	Ruth Ellis	Miranda Richardson
Eoudong	Uhwudong	Lee Bo-hee
Florence Nightingale	Florence Nightingale	Jaclyn Smith
God Rot Tunbridge Wells!	George Frideric Handel	Trevor Howard
John And Yoko: A Love Story	John Lennon	Mark McGann
John And Yoko: A Love Story	Yoko Ono	Kim Miyori
King David	King David	Richard Gere
Marie	Marie Ragghianti	Sissy Spacek
Mask	Florence Dennis	Cher
Mask	Roy L. Dennis	Eric Stoltz
Malice in Wonderland	Louella Parsons	Elizabeth Taylor
Malice in Wonderland	Hedda Hopper	Jane Alexander
Mata Hari	Mata Hari	Sylvia Kristel
Beethoven's Nephew	Ludwig van Beethoven	Wolfgang Reichmann
Mishima: A Life in Four Chapters	Yukio Mishima	Ken Ogata
Robert Kennedy & His Times	Robert F. Kennedy	Brad Davis
Out of Africa	Karen Blixen	Meryl Streep
Out of Africa	Denys Finch Hatton	Robert Redford
Sweet Dreams	Patsy Cline	Jessica Lange
Sylvia	Sylvia Ashton-Warner	Eleanor David
Wallenberg: A Hero's Story	Raoul Wallenberg	Richard Chamberlain

== 1986-89 ==
=== 1986 ===
Film	Subject(s)	Lead actor or actress
The Boy in Blue	Ned Hanlan	Nicolas Cage
Castaway	Gerald Kingsland	Oliver Reed
Castaway	Lucy Irvine	Amanda Donohoe
The Deliberate Stranger	Ted Bundy	Mark Harmon
Dream West	John C. Frémont	Richard Chamberlain
The George McKenna Story	George J. McKenna III	Denzel Washington
George Washington II: The Forging of a Nation	George Washington	Barry Bostwick
Gone to Texas	Sam Houston	Sam Elliott
Gothic	Lord Byron	Gabriel Byrne
Gothic	Percy Bysshe Shelley	Julian Sands
Gothic	Mary Shelley	Natasha Richardson
Gothic	Claire Clairmont	Myriam Cyr
Gothic	John William Polidori	Timothy Spall
Heartburn	Nora Ephron	Meryl Streep
Heartburn	Carl Bernstein	Jack Nicholson
Henry: Portrait of a Serial Killer	Henry Lee Lucas	Michael Rooker
Henry: Portrait of a Serial Killer	Otis Toole	Tom Towles
Hwang Jin Yi	Hwang Jini	Chang Mi-hee
Lady Jane	Lady Jane Grey	Helena Bonham Carter
The Last Days of Frank and Jesse James	Frank James	Johnny Cash
The Last Days of Frank and Jesse James	Jesse James	Kris Kristofferson
Palay Khan	Palay Khan	Jackie Shroff
Romanza final	Julián Gayarre	José Carreras
Salvador	Richard Boyle	James Woods
Second Serve	Renee Richards	Vanessa Redgrave
Shaka Zulu	Shaka	Henry Cele
Sid and Nancy	Sid Vicious	Gary Oldman
Sid and Nancy	Nancy Spungen	Chloe Webb
Thérèse	Thérèse of Lisieux	Catherine Mouchet
A Winner Never Quits	Pete Gray	Keith Carradine

=== 1987 ===
Film	Subject(s)	Lead actor or actress
The Betty Ford Story	Betty Ford	Gena Rowlands
Blonde Dolly	Blonde Dolly	Hilde Van Mieghem
84 Charing Cross Road	Helene Hanff	Anne Bancroft
84 Charing Cross Road	Frank Doel	Anthony Hopkins
A Child Called Jesus	Jesus	Matteo Bellina
Cry Freedom	Steve Biko	Denzel Washington
Escape from Sobibor	Liutenant Aleksandr 'Sasha' Pechersky	Rutger Hauer
Hachikō Monogatari	Hidesaburō Ueno	Tatsuya Nakadai
Hachikō Monogatari	Hachikō	Various dog actors
The Impossible Spy	Eli Cohen	John Shea
La Bamba	Ritchie Valens	Lou Diamond Phillips
LBJ: The Early Years	Lyndon B. Johnson	Randy Quaid
The Last Emperor	Pu-Yi	John Lone
Poor Little Rich Girl: The Barbara Hutton Story	Barbara Hutton	Farrah Fawcett
Prick Up Your Ears	Joe Orton	Gary Oldman
Prick Up Your Ears	Kenneth Halliwell	Alfred Molina
The Sicilian	Salvatore Giuliano	Christopher Lambert
Shinran: Path to Purity	Shinran	Junkyu Moriyama
The Untouchables	Eliot Ness	Kevin Costner
The Untouchables	Al Capone	Robert De Niro
Waiting for the Moon	Gertrude Stein	Linda Bassett
Waiting for the Moon	Alice B. Toklas	Linda Hunt
Walker	William Walker	Ed Harris
Good Morning Vietnam	Adrian Cronauer	Robin Williams
Yohwa Eoludong	Uhwudong	Kim Muh-hee

=== 1988 ===
Film	Subject(s)	Lead actor or actress
Bird	Charlie Parker	Forest Whitaker
Bloodsport	Frank Dux	Jean-Claude Van Damme
Camille Claudel	Camille Claudel	Isabelle Adjani
A Cry in the Dark	Lindy Chamberlain	Meryl Streep
David	David Rothenberg	Matthew Lawrence
David	Marie Rothenberg	Bernadette Peters
Diary of King Yeonsan	Yeonsangun of Joseon	Yu In-chon
Eight Men Out	George "Buck" Weaver	John Cusack
Eight Men Out	Oscar "Happy" Felsch	Charlie Sheen
Eight Men Out	Eddie Cicotte	David Strathairn
Eight Men Out	"Shoeless" Joe Jackson	D. B. Sweeney
Eight Men Out	Arnold "Chick" Gandil	Michael Rooker
Eight Men Out	Charles "Swede" Risberg	Don Harvey
Eight Men Out	Claude "Lefty" Williams	James Read
Eight Men Out	Fred McMullin	Perry Lang
Elvis and Me	Elvis Presley	Dale Midkiff
Elvis and Me	Priscilla Presley	Susan Walters
Gorillas in the Mist	Dian Fossey	Sigourney Weaver
Hanna's War	Hannah Szenes	Maruschka Detmers
The Legendary Life of Ernest Hemingway	Ernest Hemingway	Victor Garber
Lincoln	Abraham Lincoln	Sam Waterston
Onassis: The Richest Man in the World	Aristotle Onassis	Raul Julia
Painted Faces	Yu Jim-yuen	Sammo Hung
Patty Hearst	Patty Hearst	Natasha Richardson
Stand and Deliver	Jaime Escalante	Edward James Olmos
Tucker: The Man and His Dream	Preston Tucker	Jeff Bridges
Young Guns	Billy the Kid	Emilio Estevez
Young Guns	Doc Scurlock	Kiefer Sutherland
Young Guns	José Chávez y Chávez	Lou Diamond Phillips
Young Guns	Richard M. Brewer	Charlie Sheen
Young Guns	"Dirty" Steve Stephens	Dermot Mulroney
Young Guns	Charlie Bowdre	Casey Siemaszko

=== 1989 ===
Film	Subject(s)	Lead actor or actress
Billy the Kid	Billy the Kid	Val Kilmer
Blaze	Earl Long	Paul Newman
Blaze	Blaze Starr	Lolita Davidovich
Bomber Harris	Sir Arthur Harris	John Thaw
Born on the Fourth of July	Ron Kovic	Tom Cruise
Communion	Whitley Strieber	Christopher Walken
Shadow Makers	General Leslie Groves	Paul Newman
Shadow Makers	J. Robert Oppenheimer	Dwight Schultz
Francesco	Francis of Assisi	Mickey Rourke
Glory	Colonel Robert Gould Shaw	Matthew Broderick
Great Balls of Fire!	Jerry Lee Lewis	Dennis Quaid
Henry V	Henry V of England	Kenneth Branagh
The Karen Carpenter Story	Karen Carpenter	Cynthia Gibb
Lean on Me	Joe Louis Clark	Morgan Freeman
My Left Foot	Christy Brown	Daniel Day-Lewis
Paganini	Niccolò Paganini	Klaus Kinski
Pestalozzi's Mountain	Johann Heinrich Pestalozzi	Gian Maria Volonté
Rikyu	Sen no Rikyū	Rentarō Mikuni
Romero	Óscar Romero	Raúl Juliá
The Ryan White Story	Ryan White	Lukas Haas
Triumph of the Spirit	Salamo Arouch	Willem Dafoe
Winter of '54: Father Pierre	Abbé Pierre	Lambert Wilson
Wired	John Belushi	Michael Chiklis
Tjoet Nja' Dhien	Cut Nyak Dhien	Christine Hakim

== See also ==
- Lists of biographical films
