= List of 1987 films based on actual events =

This is a list of films and miniseries released in 1987 that are based on actual events. All films on this list are from American production unless indicated otherwise.

== 1987 ==
- 84 Charing Cross Road (1987) – British-American biographical romantic drama film based on the long-distance friendship that develops between American writer Helene Hanff and English bookseller Frank Doel through letters exchanged from 1949 to 1968
- A Place to Call Home (1987) – Australian-American drama television film about Liz Gavin and her eleven children, who relocate from Houston, Texas, to Australia
- A Winter Tan (1987) – Canadian drama film about Maryse Holder, the ill-fated feminist author who met an untimely death in Acapulco
- After the Promise (1987) – drama television film about Elmer Jackson, a carpenter in a small Californian town in the 1930s, struggling to bring up 4 young boys after the death of his wife, who is horrified when the government places the boys into various foster homes and institutions, where they are subjected to abuse, based on a true story
- The Alamo: 13 Days to Glory (1987) – Western adventure miniseries about the 1836 Battle of the Alamo
- Balweg (1987) – Filipino biographical action drama film inspired by the life of Catholic priest turned communist rebel Conrado Balweg
- The Betty Ford Story (1987) – biographical drama television film based on the life of the former first lady, Betty Ford
- Blonde Dolly (1987) – Dutch thriller drama film about the real-life Hague prostitute, Sebilla Alida Johanna Niemans, better known as "Blonde Dolly" who co-finances the purchase of a Vermeer painting
- Brother André (French: Le Frère André) – Canadian biographical drama film centring on the life of André Bessette, a Roman Catholic lay brother who was widely credited with many miraculous healings, centring in particular on his interaction with his niece Marie-Esther following a Eucharistic Congress in 1910
- Captain James Cook (1987) – Australian-French historical biographical drama miniseries about the life of James Cook, a British explorer, navigator, cartographer, and captain in the British Royal Navy
- Cry Freedom (1987) – British-Zimbabwean epic biographical drama film centring on the real-life events involving South African activist Steve Biko and his friend Donald Woods, who initially finds him too radical, and attempts to understand his way of life
- Echoes in the Darkness (1987) – drama film detailing the lurid tale of the murder of Pennsylvania's Upper Merion Area High School English teacher Susan Reinert and her two children in 1979
- El Lute: Run for Your Life (Spanish: El Lute: camina o revienta) (1987) – Spanish biographical drama film based on the memoirs of Eleuterio Sánchez, "El Lute", a young convicted murderer who became legendary in Spain for his jail escape in the 1960s
- Empire of the Sun (1987) – epic war film based on J. G. Ballard's semi-autobiographical 1984 novel of the same name, telling of a young English boy struggling to survive under Japanese occupation of China during World War II
- Escape from Sobibor (1987) – British war drama television film telling the story of the mass escape from the Nazi extermination camp at Sobibor, the most successful uprising by Jewish prisoners of German extermination camps (uprisings also took place at Auschwitz-Birkenau and Treblinka)
- Family Sins (1987) – crime drama television film based on the true story of a father whose troubled son, Bryan, is arrested for voluntary manslaughter after the drowning of his spoiled younger brother
- Farewell Moscow (Italian: Mosca addio) (1987) – Italian biographical drama film based on the life of Russian Jew Ida Nudel
- Fight for Life (1987) – drama television film based on a true story of a family's fight for the life of their 6-year-old daughter who suffers from epileptic convulsions
- Ford: The Man and the Machine (1987) – Canadian-American biographical drama television film about the life and career of Henry Ford
- Full Metal Jacket (1987) – war drama film following a platoon of U.S. Marines through their boot camp training in Marine Corps Recruit Depot Parris Island, South Carolina
- Gaby: A True Story (1987) – biographical romantic drama film chronicling the life of Gaby Brimmer, the child of Austrian Jewish refugees living in Mexico, who is born with cerebral palsy
- Good Morning, Vietnam (1987) – war comedy film loosely based on the experiences of AFRS radio DJ Adrian Cronauer
- Hachikō Monogatari (Japanese: ハチ公物語) (1987) – Japanese biographical drama film depicting the true story of Hachikō, a loyal Akita dog who continued to wait for his owner, Professor Hidesaburō Ueno, to return from work for nine years following Ueno's death
- Hamburger Hill (1987) – war drama film set during the Battle of Hamburger Hill, a May 1969 assault during the Vietnam War by the U.S. Army's 3rd Battalion, 187th Infantry, 101st Airborne Division, on a ridge of Dong Ap Bia near the Laotian border in central Vietnam
- Hip Hip Hurrah! (1987) – (Swedish: Hip hip hurra!) (1987) – Danish-Norwegian-Swedish biographical drama film presenting the general background of the Skagen Painters and everything that attracted them to gather in Skagen but it is P.S. Krøyer (Stellan Skarsgård) who is the centre of attraction
- Hope and Glory (1987) – British-American comedy war drama film based on John Boorman's own experiences growing up in London during the Second World War
- The Impossible Spy (1987) – biographical drama television film based on the true story of an Israeli civilian spy, Eli Cohen, who was recruited into Israel's secret intelligence agency (the Mossad) in the 1960s to become a spy in Damascus
- In Love and War (1987) – war thriller film based on the true story of James Stockdale and Sybil Stockdale
- In the Mood (1987) – comedy film based on the true story of Sonny Wisecarver
- La Bamba (1987) – biographical drama film following the life and short-lived musical career of Mexican-American Chicano rock and roll star Ritchie Valens
- The Last Emperor (Italian: L'ultimo imperatore) (1987) – British-Italian epic biographical drama film about the life of Puyi, the final Emperor of China
- LBJ: The Early Years (1987) – drama television film depicting the pre-presidential life of Lyndon B. Johnson, the 36th president of the United States
- Life Story (1987) – historical drama television film depicting the progress toward, and the competition for, the discovery of the structure of DNA in the early 1950s
- The Lighthorsemen (1987) – Australian war drama film about the men of a World War I light horse unit involved in Sinai and Palestine campaign's 1917 Battle of Beersheeba
- Lionheart (1987) – historical adventure film loosely based on the historical Children's Crusade
- Love Sins (Italian: D'Annunzio) (1987) – Italian biographical drama film focusing on Decadentism, that developed in France and Italy in the late 19th century and tells about Gabriele d'Annunzio, a renowned poet
- Macu, The Policeman's Woman (Spanish: Macu, la mujer del policía) (1987) – Venezuelan drama film based on the true story of a jealous policeman and his young wife living in a shanty-town in South America
- The Man Who Broke 1,000 Chains (1987) – biographical drama film recounting Robert Elliott Burns' imprisonment on a chain gang in Georgia in the 1920s, his subsequent escape to New Jersey, and the furor that developed
- Matewan (1987) – historical drama film dramatizing the events of the Battle of Matewan, a coal miners' strike in 1920 in Matewan, a small town in the hills of West Virginia
- Murder Ordained (1987) – crime drama television film based on actual events that occurred in Emporia, Kansas, in 1983, telling the story of State trooper John Rule, who investigates what appears to be a traffic accident resulting in the death of a local minister's wife
- Nancy Wake (1987) – Australian war drama miniseries about the exploits of New Zealand born Australian Nancy Wake during World War II as a female British Special Operations Executive agent based on Russell Braddon's 1956 book Nancy Wake: The Story of a Very Brave Woman
- Nayakan (Tamil: நாயக்கன்) (1987) – Indian Tamil-language epic crime film loosely based on the life of the Bombay underworld don Varadarajan Mudaliar and the American film The Godfather
- The Petrov Affair (1987) – drama miniseries based on the defection of Vladimir Petrov
- Poor Little Rich Girl: The Barbara Hutton Story (1987) – biographical drama television film chronicling the life of Barbara Hutton, a wealthy but troubled American socialite
- Prick Up Your Ears (1987) – British biographical drama film about the playwright Joe Orton and his lover Kenneth Halliwell
- Promised Land (1987) – drama film that follows two high school acquaintances, Hancock, a basketball star, and Danny, a geek turned drifter, after they graduate – based on a true story
- Race for the Bomb (French: La Course à la bombe) (1987) – Canadian-French war drama miniseries about the Manhattan Project, starting from the initial stages of scientific discovery that led to the creation of the atomic bomb, discovery of the Ulam-Teller thermonuclear weapons design and ending with the beginning of the arms race
- The Riddle of the Stinson (1987) – Australian disaster drama television film about the 1937 Airlines of Australia Stinson crash at Lamington, Queensland, Australia and the rescue of its survivors by local Queenslander Bernard O'Reilly
- The Sicilian (1987) – epic historical crime film about Salvatore Giuliano, the infamous bandit who tried to liberate early 1950s Sicily from Italian rule
- Shinran: Path to Purity (Japanese: 親鸞 白い道) (1987) – Japanese drama film following the life and struggles of the Jodo Shinshu founder, Shinran, during the tumultuous Heian era
- Theofilos (Greek: Θεόφιλος) (1987) – Greek biographical drama film based on the life of the Greek painter Theofilos Hatzimichail
- The Untouchables (1987) – crime drama film loosely based on the experiences of Eliot Ness, who was a federal agent in the Bureau of Prohibition, as he fought crime in Chicago in the late 1920s and early 1930s with the help of a special team of agents handpicked for their incorruptibility, nicknamed The Untouchables
- Waiting for the Moon (1987) – internationally co-produced drama film depicting Gertrude Stein and her lover and assistant Alice B. Toklas meeting Pablo Picasso and his lover Fernande Olivier, as well as the authors Ernest Hemingway and Guillaume Apollinaire
- Walker (1987) – American-Mexican Western biographical drama film based on the life story of William Walker, the American filibuster who invaded and made himself president of Nicaragua
- Weeds (1987) – drama film about Lee Umstetter, a prison inmate who writes a play that catches the attention of a visiting reporter
- White Mischief (1987) – British crime drama film dramatizing the events of the Happy Valley murder case in Kenya in 1941, wherein Sir Henry "Jock" Delves Broughton was tried for the murder of Josslyn Hay, 22nd Earl of Erroll
- Why? (Czech: Proč?) – Czechoslovak sport drama film dealing with the hooliganism in Czechoslovakia, particularly with the fans of football club Sparta from Prague, whose supporters were the pioneers of the football fan riots in Czechoslovakia, starting with hooligan actions already in the 1960s, like breaking the trains in which they travelled when they went on Sparta's away games
- Yohwa Eoeuludong (Korean: 요화 어을우동) (1987) – South Korean drama film about the incredible life of Joseon-era kisaeng writer, artist and poet Uhwudong
