= List of biographical films of the 1990s =

The following is a list of biographical films released in the 1990s.

== 1990 ==
Film	Subject(s)	Lead actor or actress
An Angel at My Table	Janet Frame	Karen Fergusson (child), Alexia Keogh (adolescent) and Kerry Fox (adult)
Awakenings	Oliver Sacks	Robin Williams
Portrait of a Marriage	Vita Sackville-West	Janet McTeer
Portrait of a Marriage	Violet Trefusis	Cathryn Harrison
Bhim Garjana	B. R. Ambedkar	Krishnanand
Call Me Anna	Anna Marie Duke	Patty Duke (older); Jenny Robertson (adult); Ari Meyers (youth)
C.H. Spurgeon Tonight	Charles Spurgeon	Craig Skinner
A Dangerous Man: Lawrence After Arabia	T. E. Lawrence	Ralph Fiennes
A Dangerous Man: Lawrence After Arabia	Faisal I of Iraq	Alexander Siddig
The Dreamer of Oz	L. Frank Baum	John Ritter
The Elegant Criminal	Pierre François Lacenaire	Daniel Auteuil
Europa Europa	Solomon Perel	Marco Hofschneider
Family of Spies	John Anthony Walker	Powers Boothe
Good Evening, Mr. Wallenberg	Raoul Wallenberg	Stellan Skarsgård
Goodfellas	Jimmy Conway	Robert De Niro
Goodfellas	Henry Hill	Ray Liotta
Goodfellas	Tommy DeVito	Joe Pesci
Henry & June	Henry Miller	Fred Ward
Henry & June	June Miller	Uma Thurman
Henry & June	Anaïs Nin	Maria de Medeiros
Henry & June	Hugo Guiler	Richard E. Grant
Iron & Silk	Mark Salzman	Mark Salzman
The King's Whore	Vittorio Amedeo II	Timothy Dalton
The King's Whore	Jeanne de Luynes	Valeria Golino
The Krays	The Kray twins	Martin Kemp and Gary Kemp
Nambugun	Lee Tae	Ahn Sung-ki
The Nasty Girl	Anna Rosmus	Lena Stolze
Reversal of Fortune	Claus von Bülow	Jeremy Irons
Reversal of Fortune	Sunny von Bülow	Glenn Close
Rock Hudson	Rock Hudson	Thomas Ian Griffith
Schweitzer	Albert Schweitzer	Malcolm McDowell
Spymaker: The Secret Life of Ian Fleming	Ian Fleming	Jason Connery
Vincent & Theo	Vincent van Gogh	Tim Roth
Vincent & Theo	Theo van Gogh	Paul Rhys
Voices Within: The Lives of Truddi Chase	Truddi Chase	Shelley Long
Young Guns II	Billy the Kid	Emilio Estevez

== 1991 ==
Film	Subject(s)	Lead actor or actress
Babe Ruth	Babe Ruth	Stephen Lang
Balak Ambedkar	B. R. Ambedkar	Chiranjeevi Vinay
Bugsy	Bugsy Siegel	Warren Beatty
Cabeza de Vaca	Alvar Núñez Cabeza de Vaca	Juan Diego
Center Stage	Ruan Lingyu	Maggie Cheung
Death Song	Yun Sim-deok	Chang Mi-hee
Dillinger	John Dillinger	Mark Harmon
The Doors	Jim Morrison	Val Kilmer
The Hours and Times	Brian Epstein	David Angus
The Hours and Times	John Lennon	Ian Hart
Impromptu	Frédéric Chopin	Hugh Grant
Impromptu	George Sand	Judy Davis
JFK	Jim Garrison	Kevin Costner
The Josephine Baker Story	Josephine Baker	Lynn Whitfield
Lucy & Desi: Before The Laughter	Lucille Ball	Frances Fisher
Lucy & Desi: Before The Laughter	Desi Arnaz	Maurice Benard
Not Without My Daughter	Betty Mahmoody	Sally Field
Once Upon a Time in China	Wong Fei-hung	Jet Li
The Pistol: The Birth of a Legend	Pete Maravich	Adam Guier
Prisoner of Honor	Georges Picquart	Richard Dreyfuss
Son of the Morning Star	George Armstrong Custer	Gary Cole
To Be Number One	Ng Sik-ho	Ray Lui
Tous les matins du monde	Marin Marais	Gérard Depardieu
Van Gogh	Vincent van Gogh	Jacques Dutronc
A Woman Named Jackie	Jacqueline Bouvier Kennedy Onassis	Roma Downey
A Woman Named Jackie	John F. Kennedy	Stephen Collins
Wife, Mother, Murderer	Audrey Marie Hilley	Judith Light
Wild Hearts Can't Be Broken	Sonora Webster Carver	Gabrielle Anwar
Young Catherine	Catherine II of Russia	Julia Ormond

== 1992 ==
Film	Subject(s)	Lead actor or actress
Amy Fisher: My Story	Amy Fisher	Noelle Parker
The Babe	Babe Ruth	John Goodman
Bonnie & Clyde: The True Story	Bonnie Parker	Tracey Needham
Bonnie & Clyde: The True Story	Clyde Barrow	Dana Ashbrookt
Chaplin	Charlie Chaplin	Robert Downey Jr.
Charles and Diana: Unhappily Ever After	Charles, Prince of Wales	Christopher Baines
Charles and Diana: Unhappily Ever After	Diana, Princess of Wales	Catherine Oxenberg
Citizen Cohn	Roy Marcus Cohn	James Woods
1492: Conquest of Paradise	Christopher Columbus	Gérard Depardieu
Christopher Columbus: The Discovery	Christopher Columbus	Georges Corraface
Daens	Adolf Daens	Jan Decleir
Final Shot: The Hank Gathers Story	Hank Gathers	Victor Love
Hoffa	Jimmy Hoffa	Jack Nicholson
Hostages	Peggy Say	Kathy Bates
Hostages	John McCarthy	Colin Firth
Hostages	Brian Keenan	Ciarán Hinds
Hostages	Jill Morrell	Natasha Richardson
Hostages	Terry A. Anderson	Jay O. Sanders
The Jacksons: An American Dream	Jackson family	various casts
The Last of His Tribe	Ishi	Graham Greene
Lorenzo's Oil	Augusto Odone	Nick Nolte
Lorenzo's Oil	Michaela Odone	Susan Sarandon
Malcolm X	Malcolm X	Denzel Washington
A River Runs Through It	Norman Maclean	Craig Sheffer
Ruby	Jack Ruby	Danny Aiello
Sinatra	Frank Sinatra	Philip Casnoff
Stalin	Joseph Stalin	Robert Duvall
Swoon	Nathan Leopold	Craig Chester
Swoon	Richard Loeb	Daniel Schlachet
To Catch a Killer	John Wayne Gacy	Brian Dennehy

== 1993 ==
Film	Subject(s)	Lead actor or actress
The Amy Fisher Story	Amy Fisher	Drew Barrymore
Belle van Zuylen - Madame de Charrière	Isabelle de Charrière	Will van Kralingen
Belle van Zuylen - Madame de Charrière	Benjamin Constant	Laus Steenbeeke
Benito	Benito Mussolini	Antonio Banderas
Cannibal! The Musical	Alferd Packer	Trey Parker
Casualties of Love: The Long Island Lolita Story	Amy Fisher	Alyssa Milano
Cool Runnings	1988 Jamaican Bobsleigh Team	Leon Robinson; Doug E. Doug; Rawle D. Lewis; Malik Yoba
Diana: Her True Story	Diana, Princess of Wales	Serena Scott Thomas
Dragon: The Bruce Lee Story	Bruce Lee	Jason Scott Lee
Fong Sai Yuk	Fong Sai Yuk	Jet Li
Geronimo: An American Legend	Geronimo	Wes Studi
Gettysburg	James Longstreet	Tom Berenger
Gettysburg	Joshua Chamberlain	Jeff Daniels
Gettysburg	Robert E. Lee	Martin Sheen
Gettysburg	John Buford	Sam Elliott
Gettysburg	George Pickett	Stephen Lang
Gettysburg	Thomas Chamberlain	C. Thomas Howell
Heaven & Earth	Le Ly Hayslip	Hiep Thi Le
In The Name Of The Father	Guildford Four	Daniel Day-Lewis, Pete Postlethwaite
Jeffrey Dahmer: The Secret Life	Jeffrey Dahmer	Carl Crew
JFK: Reckless Youth	John F. Kennedy	Patrick Dempsey
Ludwig 1881	Ludwig II of Bavaria	Helmut Berger
M. Butterfly	Bernard Boursicot	Jeremy Irons
Rudy	Daniel "Rudy" Ruettiger	Sean Astin
Schindler's List	Oskar Schindler	Liam Neeson
Searching for Bobby Fischer	Joshua Waitzkin	Max Pomeranc
Shadowlands	C. S. Lewis	Anthony Hopkins
Shadowlands	Joy Gresham	Debra Winger
Srinatha Kavi Sarvabhoumudu	Srinatha	N. T. Rama Rao
Thirty Two Short Films About Glenn Gould	Glenn Gould	Colm Feore
This Boy's Life	Tobias Wolff	Leonardo DiCaprio
Tombstone	Wyatt Earp	Kurt Russell
Tombstone	Doc Holliday	Val Kilmer
Viva Castro!	Fidel Castro	Pavel Zharkov
What's Love Got to Do with It	Tina Turner	Angela Bassett
What's Love Got to Do with It	Ike Turner	Laurence Fishburne
Wittgenstein	Ludwig Wittgenstein	Karl Johnson
Yugpurush Dr. Babasaheb Ambedkar	B. R. Ambedkar	Narayan Dulake
Zelda	Zelda Fitzgerald	Natasha Richardson
Zohar	Zohar Argov	Shaul Mizrachi

== 1994 ==
Film	Subject(s)	Lead actor or actress
Abraham	Abraham	Richard Harris
Amelia Earhart: The Final Flight	Amelia Earhart	Diane Keaton
Backbeat	Stuart Sutcliffe	Stephen Dorff
Backbeat	John Lennon	Ian Hart
Backbeat	Astrid Kirchherr	Sheryl Lee
Bandit Queen	Phoolan Devi	Seema Biswas
A Burning Passion: The Margaret Mitchell Story	Margaret Mitchell	Shannen Doherty
Cobb	Ty Cobb	Tommy Lee Jones
Doomsday Gun	Gerald Bull	Frank Langella
Ed Wood	Ed Wood	Johnny Depp
Ed Wood	Bela Lugosi	Martin Landau
Farinelli	Farinelli	Stefano Dionisi
Frank & Jesse	Jesse James	Rob Lowe
Frank & Jesse	Frank James	Bill Paxton
Heavenly Creatures	Pauline Parker	Melanie Lynskey
Heavenly Creatures	Juliet Hulme	Kate Winslet
Immortal Beloved	Ludwig van Beethoven	Gary Oldman
La Reine Margot	Queen Margot	Isabelle Adjani
Jacob	Jacob	Matthew Modine
The Madness of King George	George III of Great Britain	Nigel Hawthorne
Mesmer	Franz Anton Mesmer	Alan Rickman
Mrs. Parker and the Vicious Circle	Dorothy Parker	Jennifer Jason Leigh
Nostradamus	Nostradamus	Tchéky Karyo
Quiz Show	Charles Van Doren	Ralph Fiennes
The Road to Wellville	John Harvey Kellogg	Anthony Hopkins
8 Seconds	Lane Frost	Luke Perry
A Soul Haunted by Painting	Pan Yuliang	Gong Li
Squanto: A Warrior's Tale	Squanto	Adam Beach
Tom & Viv	T. S. Eliot	Willem Dafoe
Tom & Viv	Vivienne Haigh-Wood	Miranda Richardson
The Vernon Johns Story	Vernon Johns	James Earl
Wing Chun	Yim Wing-chun	Michelle Yeoh
Wyatt Earp	Wyatt Earp	Kevin Costner
Zorn	Anders Zorn	Gunnar Hellström

== 1995 ==
Film	Subject(s)	Lead actor or actress
Aletta Jacobs: Het Hoogste Streven	Aletta Jacobs	Luutgard Willems
Apollo 13	Jim Lovell	Tom Hanks
Apollo 13	Jack Swigert	Kevin Bacon
Apollo 13	Fred Haise	Bill Paxton
Balto	Balto	Kevin Bacon (voice)
The Basketball Diaries	Jim Carroll	Leonardo DiCaprio
Braveheart	William Wallace	Mel Gibson
Buffalo Girls	Calamity Jane	Anjelica Huston
Buffalo Girls	Dora DuFran	Melanie Griffith
Casino	Frank "Lefty" Rosenthal	Robert De Niro
Catherine the Great	Catherine II of Russia	Catherine Zeta-Jones
Carrington	Dora Carrington	Emma Thompson
Carrington	Lytton Strachey	Jonathan Pryce
Citizen X	Andrei Chikatilo	Jeffrey DeMunn
Dangerous Minds	LouAnne Johnson	Michelle Pfeiffer
Dead Man Walking	Sister Helen Prejean	Susan Sarandon
England, My England	Henry Purcell	Michael Ball
Faustina	Mary Faustina Kowalska	Dorota Segda
The Flor Contemplacion Story	Flor Contemplacion	Nora Aunor
The Grepor Butch Belgica Story	Grepor "Butch" Belgica	Joko Diaz (older); Johannes Belgica (young)
Jefferson in Paris	Thomas Jefferson	Nick Nolte
Joseph	Joseph	Paul Mercurio
Le Grand blanc de Lambaréné	Albert Schweitzer	André Wilms
Liz: The Elizabeth Taylor Story	Elizabeth Taylor	Sherilyn Fenn
Love Can Build a Bridge	Naomi Judd	Kathleen York
Love Can Build a Bridge	Wynonna Judd	Viveka Davis
Murder in the First	Henri Young	Kevin Bacon
Nixon	Richard Nixon	Anthony Hopkins
Panther	Bobby Seale	Courtney B. Vance
Panther	Huey P. Newton	Marcus Chong
Restoration	Charles II of England	Sam Neill
Rob Roy	Robert Roy MacGregor	Liam Neeson
Sister My Sister	Christine and Lea Papin	Joely Richardson
Sister My Sister	Christine and Lea Papin	Jodhi May
Solomon & Sheba	Solomon	Jimmy Smits
Solomon & Sheba	Queen of Sheba	Halle Berry
Tad	Tad Lincoln	Bug Hall
Total Eclipse	Arthur Rimbaud	Leonardo DiCaprio
Total Eclipse	Paul Verlaine	David Thewlis
Truman	Harry S. Truman	Gary Sinise
Tyson	Mike Tyson	Michael Jai White
Wild Bill	Wild Bill Hickok	Jeff Bridges
Wild Bill	Calamity Jane	Ellen Barkin
Madonna: Innocence Lost	Madonna	Terumi Matthews
The Young Poisoner's Handbook	Graham Young	Hugh O'Conor (older); Tobias Arnold (young)

== 1996 ==
Film	Subject(s)	Lead actor or actress
Basquiat	Jean-Michel Basquiat	Jeffrey Wright
Beaumarchais	Pierre Beaumarchais	Fabrice Luchini
The Crucible	John Proctor	Daniel Day-Lewis
The Crucible	Abigail Williams	Winona Ryder
Entertaining Angels: The Dorothy Day Story	Dorothy Day	Moira Kelly
Evita	Eva Perón	Madonna
The Ghost and the Darkness	John Henry Patterson	Val Kilmer
Ghosts of Mississippi	Byron De La Beckwith	James Woods
Ghosts of Mississippi	Bobby DeLaughter	Alec Baldwin
Ghosts of Mississippi	Myrlie Evers	Whoopi Goldberg
A Girl Called Rosemary	Rosemarie Nitribitt	Nina Hoss
Gotti	John Gotti	Armand Assante
Infinity	Richard Feynman	Matthew Broderick
In Love and War	Ernest Hemingway	Chris O'Donnell
I Shot Andy Warhol	Valerie Solanas	Lili Taylor
Killer: A Journal of Murder	Carl Panzram	James Woods
Michael Collins	Michael Collins	Liam Neeson
Moses	Moses	Ben Kingsley
Nasser 56	Gamal Abdel Nasser	Ahmed Zaki
Norma Jean & Marilyn	Marilyn Monroe	Ashley Judd and Mira Sorvino
The People vs. Larry Flynt	Larry Flynt	Woody Harrelson
Rasputin: Dark Servant of Destiny	Grigori Rasputin	Alan Rickman
Rebound: The Legend of Earl "The Goat" Manigault	Earl Manigault	Don Cheadle
Saint-Ex	Antoine de Saint-Exupéry	Bruno Ganz
Saint-Ex	Consuelo de Saint-Exupéry	Miranda Richardson
Samson and Delilah	Samson	Dennis Hopper
Samson and Delilah	Delilah	Elizabeth Hurley
Shine	David Helfgott	Geoffrey Rush and Noah Taylor
Surviving Picasso	Pablo Picasso	Anthony Hopkins
The Late Shift	Helen Kushnick	Kathy Bates
The Late Shift	David Letterman	John Michael Higgins
The Late Shift	Jay Leno	Daniel Roebuck
Unabomber: The True Story	Ted Kaczynski	Tobin Bell
The Whole Wide World	Robert E. Howard	Vincent D'Onofrio
The Whole Wide World	Novalyne Price Ellis	Renée Zellweger

== 1997 ==
Film	Subject(s)	Lead actor or actress
Amistad	John Quincy Adams	Anthony Hopkins
Amistad	Martin Van Buren	Nigel Hawthorne
Breaking the Surface: The Greg Louganis Story	Greg Louganis	Mario Lopez
David	King David	Nathaniel Parker
The Disappearance of Garcia Lorca	Federico García Lorca	Andy García
Donnie Brasco	Donnie Brasco	Johnny Depp
Elvis Meets Nixon	Elvis Presley	Rick Peters
Elvis Meets Nixon	Richard Nixon	Bob Gunton
Four Days in September	Fernando Gabeira	Pedro Cardoso
Four Days in September	Charles Burke Elbrick	Alan Arkin
The Gambler	Fyodor Dostoyevsky	Michael Gambon
Hoodlum	Ellsworth "Bumpy" Johnson	Laurence Fishburne
Hoodlum	Dutch Schultz	Tim Roth
Hoodlum	Lucky Luciano	Andy Garcia
Kundun	Tenzin Gyatso, 14th Dalai Lama	Tenzin Thuthob Tsarong (older), Gyurme Tethong (teen); Tulku Jamyang Kunga Tenzin (young),Tenzin Yeshi Paichang (toddler)
The Last Time I Committed Suicide	Neal Cassady	Thomas Jane
Mrs Brown	Queen Victoria	Judi Dench
Mrs Brown	John Brown	Billy Connolly
My Heart Is Mine Alone	Else Lasker-Schüler	Lena Stolze
My Heart Is Mine Alone	Gottfried Benn	Cornelius Obonya
Prefontaine	Steve Prefontaine	Jared Leto
Private Parts	Howard Stern	Howard Stern
Rizal sa Dapitan	Jose Rizal	Albert Martinez
Rough Riders	Theodore Roosevelt	Tom Berenger
Selena	Selena	Jennifer Lopez
Seven Years in Tibet	Heinrich Harrer	Brad Pitt
Solomon	King Solomon	Ben Cross
The Soong Sisters	Soong Ching-ling	Maggie Cheung
The Soong Sisters	Soong Ai-ling	Michelle Yeoh
The Soong Sisters	Soong Mei-ling	Vivian Wu
The Sarah Balabagan Story	Sarah Balabagan	Vina Morales
Wilde	Oscar Wilde	Stephen Fry

== 1998 ==
Film	Subject(s)	Lead actor or actress
54	Steve Rubell	Mike Myers
A Bright Shining Lie	John Paul Vann	Bill Paxton
A Civil Action	Jan Schlichtmann	John Travolta
Dangerous Beauty	Veronica Franco	Catherine McCormack
Diana: A Tribute to the People's Princess	Diana, Princess of Wales	Amy Seccombe
Elizabeth	Elizabeth I	Cate Blanchett
Elizabeth	Francis Walsingham	Geoffrey Rush
Elizabeth	Thomas Howard, 4th Duke of Norfolk	Christopher Eccleston
Elizabeth	Robert Dudley, 1st Earl of Leicester	Joseph Fiennes
Elizabeth	Pope Pius V	John Gielgud
Elizabeth	William Cecil, 1st Baron Burghley	Richard Attenborough
Fear and Loathing in Las Vegas	Hunter S. Thompson	Johnny Depp
Fifteen and Pregnant	Tina Spangler	Kirsten Dunst
The General	Martin Cahill	Brendan Gleeson
Gia	Gia Marie Carangi	Angelina Jolie (older); Mila Kunis (young)
Gods and Monsters	James Whale	Ian McKellen
Grey Owl	Grey Owl	Pierce Brosnan
Hilary and Jackie	Hilary du Pré	Rachel Griffiths
Hilary and Jackie	Jacqueline du Pré	Emily Watson
Jeremiah	Jeremiah	Patrick Dempsey
Jinnah	Muhammad Ali Jinnah	Christopher Lee
José Rizal	José Rizal	Cesar Montano
Lautrec	Henri de Toulouse-Lautrec	Régis Royer
Love Is the Devil: Study for a Portrait of Francis Bacon	Francis Bacon	Derek Jacobi
Patch Adams	Hunter "Patch" Adams	Robin Williams
Permanent Midnight	Jerry Stahl	Ben Stiller
The Prince of Egypt	Moses and Ramesses II	Val Kilmer and Ralph Fiennes
The Rat Pack	Frank Sinatra	Ray Liotta
The Rat Pack	Dean Martin	Joe Mantegna
The Rat Pack	Sammy Davis Jr.	Don Cheadle
The Temptations	The Temptations	Leon, Terron Brooks, D. B. Woodside
Shakespeare in Love	William Shakespeare	Joseph Fiennes
Swami Vivekananda	Swami Vivekananda	Sarvadaman D. Banerjee
Winchell	Walter Winchell	Stanley Tucci
Without Limits	Steve Prefontaine	Billy Crudup
Without Limits	Bill Bowerman	Donald Sutherland
Why Do Fools Fall in Love	Frankie Lymon	Larenz Tate

== 1999 ==
Film	Subject(s)	Lead actor or actress
The 13th Warrior	Ahmad ibn Fadlan	Antonio Banderas
And the Beat Goes On: The Sonny and Cher Story	Sonny Bono	Jay Underwood
And the Beat Goes On: The Sonny and Cher Story	Cher	Renee Faia
Angela's Ashes	Frank McCourt	Joe Breen young, Ciaran Owens (middle) and Michael Legge (older)
Anna and the King	Anna Leonowens	Jodie Foster
Aristocrats	Lady Caroline Lennox	Serena Gordon
Aristocrats	Lady Louisa Lennox	Anne-Marie Duff
Aristocrats	Lady Sarah Lennox	Jodhi May
Aristocrats	Lady Emily Lennox	Geraldine Somerville (young); Siân Phillips (older)
Balzac: A Life of Passion	Honoré de Balzac	Gérard Depardieu
Boys Don't Cry	Brandon Teena	Hilary Swank
Children of the Century	George Sand	Juliette Binoche
Children of the Century	Alfred de Musset	Benoît Magimel
Come On, Get Happy: The Partridge Family Story	Danny Bonaduce	Shawn Pyfrom
Come On, Get Happy: The Partridge Family Story	David Cassidy	Rodney Scott
Cradle Will Rock	Marc Blitzstein	Hank Azaria
Dash and Lilly	Dashiell Hammett	Sam Shepard
Dash and Lilly	Lillian Hellman	Judy Davis
Esther	Esther	Louise Lombard
Girl, Interrupted	Susanna Kaysen	Winona Ryder
Goya in Bordeaux	Francisco Goya	José Coronado as (Goya young)
Goya in Bordeaux	Francisco Goya	Francisco Rabal as (Goya old)
Hefner: Unauthorized	Hugh Hefner	Randall Batinkoff
The Hurricane	Rubin Carter	Denzel Washington
The Insider	Jeffrey Wigand	Russell Crowe
Introducing Dorothy Dandridge	Dorothy Dandridge	Halle Berry
Jesus	Jesus	Jeremy Sisto
Joan of Arc	Joan of Arc	Leelee Sobieski
Man on the Moon	Andy Kaufman	Jim Carrey
Mary, Mother of Jesus	Mary of Nazareth	Pernilla August
Mary, Mother of Jesus	Young Mary	Melinda Kinnaman
The Messenger: The Story of Joan of Arc	Joan of Arc	Milla Jovovich
Moloch	Adolf Hitler	Leonid Mozgovoy
Molokai: The Story of Father Damien	Father Damien	David Wenham
Music of the Heart	Roberta Guaspari	Meryl Streep
October Sky	Homer Hickam	Jake Gyllenhaal
The Passion of Ayn Rand	Ayn Rand	Helen Mirren
The Passion of Ayn Rand	Nathaniel Branden	Eric Stoltz
Passion: The Story of Percy Grainger	Percy Grainger	Richard Roxburgh
Pirates of Silicon Valley	Steve Jobs	Noah Wyle
Pirates of Silicon Valley	Bill Gates	Anthony Michael Hall
RKO 281	Orson Welles	Liev Schreiber
Rocky Marciano	Rocky Marciano	Jon Favreau
The Straight Story	Alvin Straight	Richard Farnsworth
Summer of Sam	David Berkowitz	Michael Badalucco
Sweetwater: A True Rock Story	Nancy "Nansi" Nevins	Amy Jo Johnson (young); Michelle Phillips (older)
To Walk with Lions	George Adamson	Richard Harris
To Walk with Lions	Tony Fitzjohn	John Michie
Topsy-Turvy	W. S. Gilbert	Jim Broadbent
Topsy-Turvy	Arthur Sullivan	Allan Corduner
Tuesdays with Morrie	Morrie Schwartz	Jack Lemmon
Tuesdays with Morrie	Mitch Albom	Hank Azaria

== See also ==
- Lists of biographical films
