= Lists of biographical films =

This is a list of biographical films, also known as biopics.

== Lists by decade ==
- List of biographical films pre-1960s
- List of biographical films of the 1960s
- List of biographical films of the 1970s
- List of biographical films of the 1980s
- List of biographical films of the 1990s
- List of biographical films of the 2000s
- List of biographical films of the 2010s
- List of biographical films of the 2020s

== See also ==
- List of composers depicted on film
