= List of biographical films of the 1960s =

This list includes biographical films released between the year of 1960 and 1969, arranged chronologically by year. These films depict the lives of historical figures, artists, politicians, athletes, and other influential individuals, bringing their stories to the screen.

== 1960 ==
Film	Subject(s)	Lead actor or actress
Alfonso XII y María Cristina	Alfonso XII of Spain	Vicente Parra
Alfonso XII y María Cristina	Maria Christina of Austria	Marga López
Bluebeard's Ten Honeymoons	Henri Désiré Landru	George Sanders
David and Goliath	King David	Ivica Pajer
David and Goliath	King Saul	Orson Welles
Esther and the King	Esther	Joan Collins
The Flesh and the Fiends	William Burke	George Rose
The Flesh and the Fiends	William Hare	Donald Pleasence
The Gallant Hours	William Halsey Jr.	James Cagney
Hell to Eternity	Guy Gabaldon	Jeffrey Hunter
I Aim at the Stars	Wernher von Braun	Curd Jürgens
Oscar Wilde	Oscar Wilde	Robert Morley
Por ti aprendí a querer	Lorenzo Barcelata	Antonio Maciel
Pretty Boy Floyd	Pretty Boy Floyd	John Ericson
Song Without End	Franz Liszt	Dirk Bogarde
Spartacus	Spartacus	Kirk Douglas
The Story of Ruth	Ruth	Elana Eden
Sunrise at Campobello	Franklin D. Roosevelt	Ralph Bellamy
Sweetheart of the Gods	Renate Müller	Ruth Leuwerik
The Trials of Oscar Wilde	Oscar Wilde	Peter Finch

== 1961 ==
Film	Subject(s)	Lead actor or actress
Barabbas	Barabbas	Anthony Quinn
Bridge to the Sun	Gwen & Hidenari Terisaki	Carroll Baker & James Shigeta
Darclee	Hariclea Darclée	Silvia Popovici
El Cid	El Cid	Charlton Heston
The Flash Elorde Story	Gabriel Elorde	Gabriel Elorde
Francis of Assisi	Francis of Assisi	Bradford Dillman
Fray Escoba	Martin de Porres	René Muñoz
Galileo	Galileo Galilei	James Grout
The George Raft Story	George Raft	Ray Danton
Hoodlum Priest	Father Charles Dismas Clark	Don Murray
King of Kings	Jesus	Jeffrey Hunter
King of the Roaring 20s	Arnold Rothstein	David Janssen
Mad Dog Coll	Mad Dog Coll	John Davis Chandler
The Moises Padilla Story	Moises Padilla	Leopoldo Salcedo
Prince Yeonsan	Yeonsangun of Joseon	Shin Young-kyun
Portrait of a Mobster	Dutch Schultz	Vic Morrow
A Story of David	King David	Jeff Chandler

== 1962 ==
Film	Subject(s)	Lead actor or actress
Birdman of Alcatraz	Robert Franklin Stroud	Burt Lancaster
Docteur Schweitzer	Albert Schweitzer	Jean-Pierre Marielle
Elgar	Edward Elgar	Peter Brett
Freud: The Secret Passion	Sigmund Freud	Montgomery Clift
Geronimo	Geronimo	Chuck Connors
Gypsy	Gypsy Rose Lee	Natalie Wood
Gypsy	June Havoc	Ann Jillian
Gypsy	Rose Thompson Hovick	Rosalind Russell
Hitler	Adolf Hitler	Richard Basehart
Joseph and His Brethren	Joseph	Geoffrey Horne
Lawrence of Arabia	T. E. Lawrence	Peter O'Toole
The Miracle Worker	Helen Keller	Patty Duke
The Miracle Worker	Annie Sullivan	Anne Bancroft
No Man Is an Island	George Ray Tweed	Jeffrey Hunter
The Reluctant Saint	Joseph of Cupertino	Maximilian Schell
Salvatore Giuliano	Salvatore Giuliano	Pietro Cammarata
Sodom and Gomorrah	Lot	Stewart Granger
The Trial of Joan of Arc	Joan of Arc	Florence Delay
The Wonderful World of the Brothers Grimm	Wilhelm Grimm	Laurence Harvey
The Wonderful World of the Brothers Grimm	Jacob Grimm	Karlheinz Böhm

== 1963 ==
Film	Subject(s)	Lead actor or actress
Al Nasser Salah Ad-Din	Saladin	Ahmed Mazhar
Cleopatra	Cleopatra	Elizabeth Taylor
Jacob, the Man Who Fought With God	Jacob	Fosco Giacchei
Landru	Henri Désiré Landru	Charles Denner
PT 109	John F. Kennedy	Cliff Robertson

== 1964 ==
Film	Subject(s)	Lead actor or actress
Becket	Thomas Becket	Richard Burton
Becket	Henry II of England	Peter O'Toole
Lady General Hua Mu-lan	Hua Mulan	Ivy Ling Po
Saul and David	King David	Gianni Garko
Saul and David	King Saul	Norman Wooland
The Unsinkable Molly Brown	Molly Brown	Debbie Reynolds
Your Cheatin' Heart	Hank Williams	George Hamilton

== 1965 ==
Film	Subject(s)	Lead actor or actress
The Agony and the Ecstasy	Michelangelo	Charlton Heston
The Debussy Film	Claude Debussy	Oliver Reed
Genghis Khan	Genghis Khan	Omar Sharif
The Greatest Story Ever Told	Jesus	Max von Sydow
Harlow	Jean Harlow	Carroll Baker
Harlow	Jean Harlow	Carol Lynley
The Magnificent Yankee	Oliver Wendell Holmes Jr.	Alfred Lunt
Lee Seong-gye King Taejo	Taejo of Joseon	Shin Young-kyun
A Man Named John	Pope John XXIII	Giovanni Rossi
A Patriot for Me	Alfred Redl	John Osborne
The Sound of Music	Maria von Trapp	Julie Andrews
The Sound of Music	Georg von Trapp	Christopher Plummer
The Sound of Music	Mother abbess	Peggy Wood

== 1966 ==
Film	Subject(s)	Lead actor or actress
'Born Free	Joy Adamson	Virginia McKenna
'Born Free	George Adamson	Bill Travers
El Greco	El Greco	Mel Ferrer
Isadora Duncan, the Biggest Dancer in the World	Isadora Duncan	Vivian Pickles
Khartoum	General Gordon	Charlton Heston
Khartoum	Muhammad Ahmad	Laurence Olivier
La vida de Pedro Infante	Pedro Infante	Jose Infante Cruz
A Man for All Seasons	Thomas More	Paul Scofield
Rasputin, the Mad Monk	Grigori Rasputin	Christopher Lee
The Singing Nun	Jeanine Deckers	Debbie Reynolds

== 1967 ==
Film	Subject(s)	Lead actor or actress
Bill Wallace of China	Dr Bill Wallace	Gregory Walcott
Bonnie and Clyde	Bonnie Parker	Faye Dunaway
Bonnie and Clyde	Clyde Barrow	Warren Beatty
Cervantes	Miguel de Cervantes	Horst Buchholz
Custer of the West	George Armstrong Custer	Robert Shaw
Elvira Madigan	Elvira Madigan	Pia Degermark
The Happiest Millionaire	Anthony Joseph Drexel Biddle Sr.	Fred MacMurray
The Life of Na Woon-gyu	Na Woon-gyu	Choi Moo-ryong
Sofiya Perovskaya	Sofiya Perovskaya	Aleksandra Nazarova

== 1968 ==
Film	Subject(s)	Lead actor or actress
Bloody Che Contra	Che Guevara	Francisco Rabal
The Boston Strangler	Albert DeSalvo	Tony Curtis
The Chronicle of Anna Magdalena Bach	Johann Sebastian Bach	Gustav Leonhardt
The Chronicle of Anna Magdalena Bach	Anna Magdalena Bach	Christiane Lang
Funny Girl	Fanny Brice	Barbra Streisand
Hrabina Cosel	Anna Constantia von Brockdorff	Jadwiga Barańska
Hrabina Cosel	Augustus II the Strong	Mariusz Dmockowski
Isadora	Isadora Duncan	Vanessa Redgrave
The Lion in Winter	Henry II of England	Peter O'Toole
The Lion in Winter	Eleanor of Aquitaine	Katharine Hepburn
Prince Daewon	Heungseon Daewongun	Shin Young-kyun
Star!	Gertrude Lawrence	Julie Andrews
Paper Lion	George Plimpton	Alan Alda
Song of Summer	Frederick Delius	Max Adrian

== 1969 ==
Film	Subject(s)	Lead actor or actress
Alfred the Great	Alfred the Great	David Hemmings
Anne of the Thousand Days	Henry VIII	Richard Burton
Anne of the Thousand Days	Anne Boleyn	Geneviève Bujold
Butch Cassidy and the Sundance Kid	Butch Cassidy	Paul Newman
Butch Cassidy and the Sundance Kid	Harry Longabaugh	Robert Redford
The Color of Pomegranates	Sayat-Nova	Sofiko Chiaureli, others
Che!	Che Guevara	Omar Sharif
De Sade	Marquis de Sade	Keir Dullea
Emma Hamilton	Emma Hamilton	Michèle Mercier
Emma Hamilton	Lord Horatio Nelson	Richard Johnson
Posol Sovetskogo Soyuza	Alexandra Kollontai	Yuliya Borisova
Simón Bolívar	Simón Bolívar	Maximilian Schell
Where's Jack?	Jack Sheppard	Tommy Steele

== See also ==
- Lists of biographical films
