= The Longshots =

- Theatrical release poster
- Directed by: Fred Durst
- Written by: Nick Santora; Doug Atchison
- Produced by: Ice Cube; Matt Alvarez; Nick Santora
- Starring: Ice Cube; Keke Palmer; Dash Mihok; Tasha Smith; Jill Marie Jones; Matt Craven
- Cinematography: Conrad W. Hall
- Edited by: Jeffrey Wolf
- Music by: Teddy Castellucci
- Production companies: Dimension Films; Cube Vision; BlackJack Films
- Distributed by: The Weinstein Company; Metro-Goldwyn-Mayer
- Release date: August 22, 2008
- Running time: 95 minutes
- Country: United States
- Language: English
- Budget: $23 million
- Box office: $11.8 million

The Longshots is a 2008 American sports comedy-drama film directed by Fred Durst, based on the real life events of Jasmine Plummer, the first girl to participate in the Pop Warner football tournament with the Harvey Colts led by head coach Richard Brown Jr. The film stars Ice Cube and Keke Palmer, their second film together after Barbershop 2: Back in Business, and was released by The Weinstein Company and Metro-Goldwyn-Mayer on August 22, 2008.

== Plot ==
Minden, Louisiana, is a former factory town with a failing economy and a pathetic football team that no one believes in. Curtis Plummer, a washed-up former football player, returns home broke and directionless until he meets his niece Jasmine, the daughter of his no-good brother Roy. Jasmine has worn her father's watch ever since he left five years ago in the hopes that he will one day return. Her mother Claire asks Curtis to take care of Jasmine after school as she is too busy with her job at the local diner. Curtis realizes Jasmine has a talent for throwing a football, which he nurtures into a passion for the game. He then persuades her to try out for the town's Pop Warner football team, the Minden Browns, because he thinks it would be good for her. The team, including the coach, are against admitting a female player, but Jasmine's abilities gain her a spot on the team. However, the coach deliberately keeps her on the bench. In the fourth game, after much prodding from Curtis, the coach puts Jasmine in the game, and although the Browns lose, everyone said they could have won if she had played from the beginning. Jasmine is then assigned as the starting quarterback and the Minden Browns quickly become a winning team.

Everything is going great until Coach Fisher suffers a heart attack, and the assistant coach asks Curtis to step in as a replacement for the last two games. He hesitates at first, still haunted by his past failures, but is eventually talked into. The Browns win the two games and are able to go to the Pop Warner Super Bowl in Miami Beach. Roy suddenly shows up to meet them, having seen his daughter play on TV. Claire and Curtis are both unhappy and suspicious about his return, but Jasmine is ecstatic, convinced that Roy finally wants to be a part of her life.

The Browns are nearly forced to skip the Super Bowl due to a lack of money, but are able to raise enough from the town; even Curtis pitches in by donating the last of his life savings. The Browns play poorly in the first half when Roy does not show up to watch. Curtis talks her through her feelings and the Browns rally for the second half. They lose the game after a teammate drops the ball on the last play, but everyone is glad nonetheless that for the first time, the Browns made it to the championship. Jasmine finally confronts her deadbeat father and returns his watch, cutting him out of her life for good and accepting Curtis as the father figure she always wanted.

== Cast ==
- Ice Cube as Curtis Plummer
- Keke Palmer as Jasmine Plummer
- Dash Mihok as Cyrus
- Tasha Smith as Claire Plummer
- Jill Marie Jones as Ronnie Macer
- Matt Craven as Coach Fisher
- Malcolm Goodwin as Roy
- Debby Ryan as Edith Smith
- Chloe Bridges as Tammy Anderson
- Kofi Siriboe as Javy Hall
- Garrett Morris as Reverend Pratt
- Alan Aisenberg as "Feather"
- Michael Colyar as Ennis
- Earthquake as Karl
- Glenn Plummer as Winston
- Wayne Dehart as Mr Peppers
- Dean Delray as Andrew Kosowski

== Production ==
The film was shot mostly in northwestern Louisiana, with the majority being in the small city of Minden. It was filmed at Minden High School and the Webster Parish Alternative School. The "Super Bowl" was filmed in Shreveport, Louisiana at Calvary Baptist Academy.

During a 2024 interview with Shannon Sharpe on his podcast, Keke Palmer says she was initially cast for the part of Jasmine. But after Fred Durst was hired to direct the film, Durst didn't want her for the role and it was re-cast. Several months into production filmmakers realized it wasn't working with the new actress and Palmer was re-hired for the role.

== Release ==
The Longshots was released on DVD on December 2, 2008. It opened at #18 at the DVD sales chart, selling 143,000 units for revenue of $2,858,950. By January 2009, 471,000 DVD units had been sold, translating to $11 million in revenue.

== Reception ==
=== Box office ===
The Longshots opened on August 22, 2008 and grossed $4,080,687 in its opening week. It flopped at the box office, grossing $11,767,866 worldwide, on a $23 million budget.

=== Critical reception ===
The Longshots received mixed reviews. Review aggregation website Rotten Tomatoes gives the film an approval rating of 41% based on 71 reviews, with an average rating of 5.2/10. The site's critical consensus reads, "The Longshots means well, but it's a largely formulaic affair, rarely deviating from the inspirational sports movie playbook." On Metacritic, the film has a weighted average score of 52 out of 100, based on 19 critics, indicating "mixed or average reviews". Audiences polled by CinemaScore gave the film an average grade of "A" on an A+ to F scale.

Ruthe Stein of San Francisco Chronicle opined that Keke Palmer's "winning manner and incandescent smile" made her "a perfect fit" for her role in the film.

== See also ==
- List of American football films
