= Piet Kamerman =

Dutch actor (1925–2025)

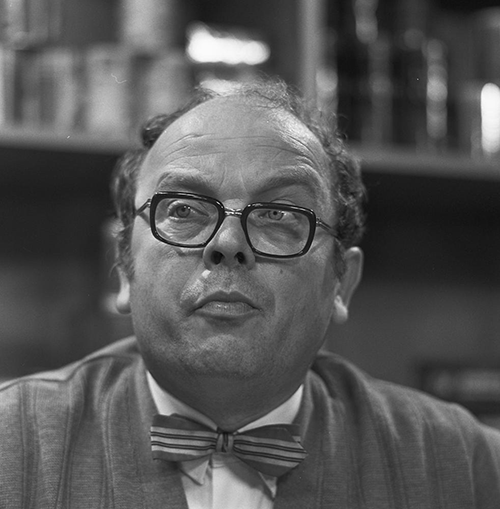
- Kamerman in 1981
- Born: 28 December 1925; Eindhoven, Netherlands
- Died: 3 June 2025 (aged 99); Utrecht, Netherlands
- Occupation: Actor
- Years active: 1950–2007
- Spouse: Elly Ruimschotel

Piet Kamerman (28 December 1925 – 3 June 2025) was a Dutch actor known for his extensive work in theatre, film, television and radio.

== Early life ==
Kamerman was born on 28 December 1925 in Eindhoven, North Brabant, Netherlands. He began as a passionate amateur performer in Eindhoven, where he also wrote and performed cabaret songs. In 1949, he enrolled at the Amsterdam Drama School (Toneelschool), graduating in 1952, followed by his stage debut in Nog een spelletje by E.S. Willartz.

== Career ==
After earning his diploma in 1952, Kamerman worked with the Haagse Comedie in 1953. He performed on television and radio before relocating internationally. In 1955, he joined the Canadian Broadcasting Corporation and returned briefly to Dutch theatre before departing for the Antilles in 1959 with his wife for Sticusa productions. Between 1960 and 1965, he was active with Toneelgroep Theater and Toneelgroep Studio in the Netherlands. From 1967 and 1969, he returned to the Antilles, then settled in Ireland in 1969, focusing on writing for stage, film, and television, while occasionally acting.

Kamerman appeared in a variety of productions, including the TV series Uilenspiegel (1973), Hollands glorie (1977), Baantjer (1995), and the comedy series Laat maar zitten. Film highlights included Blonde Dolly (1987), Parfait Amour (1985), and Wolfsbergen (2007).

In 2020, he appeared as himself in the short documentary Het late leven, portraying life in his 90s on an Irish farm.

== Personal life and death ==
Kamerman married fellow actress Elly Ruimschotel, whom he met during his early theatre years. They lived and worked together in Canada, the Antilles, and later in Ireland until her death in 2000.

Kamerman died on 3 June 2025, at the age of 99.

== Filmography ==
- Parfait Amour (1985) – Guido Vercauteren
- Blonde Dolly (1987) – Debrie
- Wolfsbergen (2007) – Konraad
- Uilenspiegel (1973)
- Hollands glorie (1977)
- Baantjer (1995–2006) – Lowietje
- Laat maar zitten (1988)
