= Pop Warner Little Scholars =

American non-profit organization

- Official logo of Pop Warner Little Scholars
- Named after: Pop Warner
- Formation: 1929; 97 years ago
- Founder: Joseph J. Tomlin
- Type: Non-profit
- Headquarters: Langhorne, Pennsylvania
- Region served: United States
- Website: Official website

Pop Warner Little Scholars, commonly known simply as Pop Warner, is a nonprofit organization that provides activities such as American football, for over 425,000 youths aged 5 to 16 years old, in several nations. It is the largest youth football organization in the United States.

Its headquarters are in Langhorne, Pennsylvania. Pop Warner Little Scholars is named after football coach Pop Warner, who heavily contributed to the organization in its early years.

== Participation ==
Participation has declined as parents become more concerned about concussions in American football.

Jasmine Plummer was the first girl to participate in a Pop Warner football team as quarterback. At the age of 11 years old, she became the first female quarterback and the first black female athlete to play in the Pop Warner Super Bowl youth football tournament, specifically the 56th Annual Pop Warner Super Bowl (Junior Pee Wee division); however, her team, the Harvey Colts, lost in the semifinals.

== Age and weight divisions ==
Division	Age requirements	Weight requirements	End-of-season max
Junior Tiny-Mite	3-4		
Tiny-Mite	5–7	35–75 lbs	79 lbs.
Mitey-Mite	7–9	45–100 lbs	104 lbs.
Jr. Pee Wee	8–10 (11)	60–115 lbs (60–95 lbs)	119 lbs. (99 lbs)
Pee Wee	9–11 (12)	75–130 lbs (75–110 lbs)	134 lbs. (114 lbs)
Junior Varsity	10–12 (13)	90–155 lbs (90–135 lbs)	159 lbs.
Varsity	12–14 (15)	105–180 lbs (105–160 lbs)	184 lbs. (164 lbs)
Unlimited	11–14	105+ lbs	Unlimited

Some divisions allow "older but lighter" players who meet the age and weight requirements in parentheses.

== Safety and brain health ==
In the 2010s, there was much controversy about football and brain health, with a number of studies focusing not just on the occasional concussion, but also on the large number of sub-concussive hits. One game in particular in 2012 resulted in five concussions. In 2015, a family sued Pop Warner over the suicide of a former player who was later found to have chronic traumatic encephalopathy (CTE), claiming that the organization knew or should have known about the risk of head injuries. Several other lawsuits have been filed against Pop Warner for related cases. At least one case resulted in a settlement.

In 2016, the Pop Warner league banned kickoffs in an attempt to reduce high-speed collisions that result in concussions. In 2019, they banned younger players from using a three-point stance, which is associated with head injuries.

A 2018 study found that tackle football before age 12 was correlated with earlier onset of symptoms of CTE, but not with symptom severity. There have also been advocates for flag football only before certain ages.

Michael Lewis, a preventive medicine specialist on the Pop Warner Youth Football Medical Advisory Board, says that even people who do not believe that football causes CTE should support reducing the number of times children and adolescents have their heads hit, because "there’s no downside to decreasing" the risk to the brain. The Concussion Legacy Foundation with the slogan "Stop Hitting Kids in the Head", encourages parents and coaches to prefer flag football over tackle football until age 14.

== See also ==
- Early sports specialization
