= Jasmine Plummer =

American football player

Nevada Storm
- Position: Running back

Personal information
- Born: c. 1992 (age 33–34); Harvey, Illinois

Career history
- Nevada Storm (2021)

Jasmine Plummer (born c. 1993 Harvey, Illinois) is an American football player who was the first-ever female quarterback for a Pop Warner football team. At the age of 11 years old, she became the first female quarterback and the first black female athlete to play in the Pop Warner Super Bowl youth football tournament, specifically the 56th Annual Pop Warner Super Bowl (Junior Pee Wee division); however, her team, the Harvey Colts, lost in the semifinals.

In 2008, Plummer was portrayed by Keke Palmer in the biographical film The Longshots.

== Early life and youth career ==
In spring 2001, 8-year-old Jasmine Plummer started playing tackle football with others in her neighborhood. Her mother, Cassandra Johnson, learned of this when Jasmine severely injured her knee while playing, requiring 23 stitches. A few weeks later, Plummer returned to playing football in the neighborhood park.

Plummer's uncle, Fred Johnson, noticed her ability to throw a football with a tight spiral and quite a bit of velocity. After difficult negotiations with her mother, Fred enrolled Plummer into the Pop Warner program.

After spending her first year on the bench, Plummer was taken by her uncle to the Mighty Mite division (7-to-9-year-olds) Harvey Colts, the team he was coaching, and made her the starting quarterback. Upon her arrival, her teammates did not welcome her but they quickly changed their minds when they started winning games. As the team continued to win under the leadership of Plummer, coach Johnson decided to play her as a linebacker because she was fast and strong for her age and size (she was 4 feet 9 inches (1.45 m) and 90 pounds (41 kg) at the time). The Colts finished the regular season with a perfect record before losing in the regionals. The next year, Plummer moved to the Harvey Colts of the Junior Pee Wee division.

Then coached by longtime coach of the Harvey Colts, Richard Brown Jr. of Harvey, Illinois, Plummer and the Harvey Colts won 8 of 9 games of the regular season and won their regional playoffs to earn a trip to the Pop Warner Super Bowl in December 2003.

Despite losing the final 13–2 against the Southeast Apaches (Texas), the Colts won their consolation match against Hawaii's Kailua Mustangs with a score of 14–0. Plummer didn't throw a TD; there were run plays, a counter and a dive. She rarely passed because this was a run first offense.

After five years, Plummer left Pop Warner football. She then played on the women's basketball team at Joliet West High School as a point guard.

== Professional career ==
Plummer continued playing basketball in college at Feather River College before transferring to the University of Nevada, Reno.

Now, Plummer plays running back for the Nevada Storm in the semi-pro Women's Football Alliance. She led the team to a Division III national championship in her 2019 All-Stars season. In the following 2021 season, Plummer earned All-Stars recognition again, being named American Conference MVP en route to another championship in Division II.

The team competed in the WFA Pro Division in 2022. While the Storm reached the 2022 WFA Pro Playoffs, they lost to the Minnesota Vixen in the first round.

== See also ==
- The Longshots
