= Hilde Van Mieghem =

Belgian actress

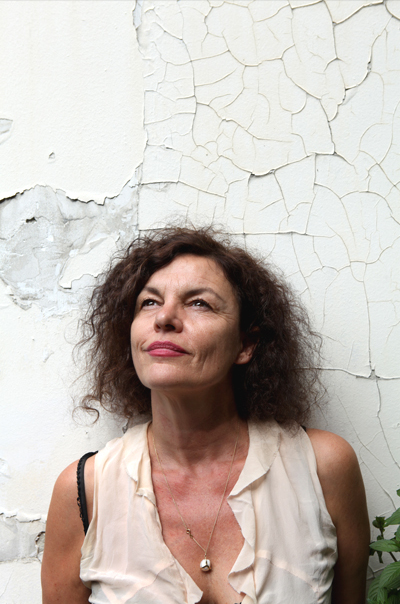
- Hilde Van Mieghem
- Born: 14 April 1958 (age 68); Antwerp, Belgium
- Occupation: Actress
- Years active: 1980–present

Hilde Van Mieghem (born 14 April 1958, in Antwerp) is a Belgian actress.

== Filmography ==
This is a partial list of films.

=== Directing ===
- 2004: De Kus (English title The Kiss)
- 2006: Love Belongs to Everyone
- 2010: Smoorverliefd (Belgian version)
- 2013: Smoorverliefd (Dutch version)
- 2017: Sprakeloos

=== Films ===
- Vrijdag (1980)
- Toute une nuit (1982)
- De witte waan (1984)
- Blonde Dolly (1987)
- Pink Palace, Paradise Beach (1987)
- Skin (1987)
- Sailors Don't Cry (1988)
- Spelen of sterven (1990)
- Kuchnia Polska (1991)
- Kafka (1991)
- Seventh Heaven (1993)
- De wereld van Ludovic (1993)
- Wildgroei (1994)
- Rossini (1997)
- Hombres Complicados (1997)
- De suikerpot (1997)
- Dandelion Game (1998)
- Four for Venice (1998)
- Shades (1999)
- De Bal (1999)
- En vacances (2000)
- Maria (2000)
- Die achte Todsünde: Toskana-Karussell (2002)
- Alias (2002)
- Angst (2003)
- Bathroom Story (2004)
- The Ketchup Song (2004)
- The Wedding Party (2005)
- Vermist (2007)
- The Architect (2008)
- Vox Populi (2008)
- Amsterdam (2009)
- Spider in the Web (2019), as Anne-Marie.
- Death Will Come (2024)

=== Television Acting ===
- Het wassende water (1986)
- Adriaen Brouwer (1986)
- Moordspel (1987)
- L'heure Simenon (1988)
- La mort d'Auguste (1988)
- Der Fuchs (1989)
- Commissaris Roos (1990)
- Mama mijn papa (1990)
- Oog in oog (1991)
- Moeder, waarom leven wij? (1991)
- Kuchnia Polska (1993)
- Bex & Blanche (1993)
- Le trajet de la foudre (1994)
- Zwei zum Verlieben (1996)
- De Wolkenfabriek (1996)
- Le père Fouettard (1997)
- Quai n° 1 (1997)
- Over de liefde (1997)
- Haar aanblik is mij welgevallig (1997)
- Zwei Asse und ein König (2000)
- Klinik unter Palmen (2001)
- Recht op Recht (2001)
- Russen (2003)
- Sedes & Belli (2003)
- Witse (2004)
- De Kavijaks (2005)
- Vermist (2008)
- De Smaak van De Keyser (2008)
- In Vlaamse velden (2013)
- The Team (2015)
- De Bunker (2015)
- Tabula Rasa (2017)
