= Khuni Shikder =

2004 film by Monowar Hossain Khokon

Khuni Sikder
- Movie poster
- Bengali: খুনী শিকদার
- Directed by: Monowar Hossain Khokon
- Written by: Kamal Sarkar
- Screenplay by: Monowar Hossain Khokon
- Based on: Life of Ershad Sikder
- Produced by: Abdul Alim
- Starring: Shakib Khan; Nodi; Liton Hashmi; Sohail
- Cinematography: A. Saeed
- Edited by: Jamal Chishti
- Music by: Javed Ahmed Kislo; Background score: M. R. Hasan Nilu
- Production company: Monowara Films
- Distributed by: Monowara Films
- Release date: 15 November 2004 (Bangladesh)
- Running time: 127 minutes
- Country: Bangladesh
- Language: Bangla

Khuni Shikder (Bengali: খুনী শিকদার; transl. Killer Shikder) is a 2004 Bangladeshi biographical crime thriller film. The film was directed by Monowar Hossain Khokon and produced by Abdul Alim under the banner of Monowara Films. It featured Shakib Khan as the title role, who became a psycho after the death of his mother and then started killing one after another and subsequently he became the country's top terrorist and serial killer. Nasima Akter Nodi, Liton Hashmi, Sohail and Mamun Shah and others have also played supporting roles in the film.

The film is based on the biography of the Bangladeshi notorious murderer Ershad Sikder and was released on November 15, 2004, on the occasion on Eid-ul-Fitr. The film has been criticised at various times for its obscenity, but also has been widely acclaimed as one of the best performances of Shakib Khan's career. This is the first negative character of Khan's career.

== Synopsis ==
Shahjahan Shikder is a thief by profession. He lived in a village with his sick mother and made a living by stealing small things. After being caught stealing several times, the villagers decided to bury him alive. When his mother tried to stop it, she died in front of Shahjahan's eyes. Repentant Shahjahan lost his mental balance and became a psycho and became angry and killed Imam of the village for the first time and left for the town. Coincidentally, he joined a local terrorist group and started terrorist activities. Shahjahan Shikder's only wish is to build a Taj Mahal like Emperor Shahjahan. Once he assassinated the leader of a terrorist group in one night and took the title of "Boro Dada" (trans: Big Grandfather). And subsequently involved in activities such as like kidnapping, murder, robbery, rape. Everyone trembled in fear of him.

== Cast ==
- Shakib Khan as Shahjahan Shikder / Boro Dada
- Nodi as Rani, stage dancer and Shikder's love interest; Shikder forced her to marry him
- Liton Hashmi as Choto, Shikdar's faithful companion; subsequently he became the main witness against Shikder
- Pichchi Sohail as Maruf, Police inspector
- Megha as Kajal
- Mamun Shah as Imran, A lawyer
- Urmila as Sumona
- Rasheda Chowdhury as Shikder's mother
- Anna as Akbar, a political party's central leader
- Jugantor Chakma as China

== Soundtrack ==
The film's soundtrack is composed by Ahmed Kislu and all the songs have been written by Moniruzzaman Monir. The song "Ami To More Jabo", written and composed by Abdus Sattar Mohanta, is also used in the film.

Track listing
| No. | Title | Lyrics | Singer(s) | Length |
|---|---|---|---|---|
| 1. | "Mitha Premer Chora Mullo (মিঠা প্রেমের চড়া মূল্য)" |
| 2. | "Ami To More Jabo (আমিতো মরে যাবো)" | Abdus Sattar Mohanta | Khan Asifur Rahman Agun | 2:39 |
| 3. | "Hayre Faisa Jay, Bhalo Baisha Jay (হায়রে ফাইসা যায় ভালো বাইসা যায়)" |
| 4. | "Tumi Ami Khelbo Dujon Premer-e Khela (তুমি আমি খেলবো দুজন প্রেমেরই খেলা)" |
| 5. | "Monete Amar Premer Garmi (মনেতে আমার প্রেমের গারমি)" |
| 6. | "Sara Ange Jouboner Juar (সারা অঙ্গে যৌবনের জোয়ার)" | | Khan Asifur Rahman Agun, Anima D'costa | 4:13 |
| 7. | "Lagilo Lagilo Premer-e Jhotka (লাগিলো লাগিলো প্রেমেরই ঝটকা)" |
| 8. | "Oh My Darling, I Love You" |
