= Prefontaine =

Préfontaine is a family surname of French-Canadian origin. All Préfontaines in North America are descended from Antoine Fournier "dit Préfontaine" (born in 1663 in Picardie, France; died in 1702 in Montréal, Canada). He was a French soldier and a barrel cooper by trade in the Compagnie de Troyes, French Marines in Canada. At the time it was common for French soldiers to adopt a nom de guerre often in reference to a trade, a place or a military rank. Antoine's nom de guerre was "dit Préfontaine", French for "field (pré) with a spring (fontaine)". He arrived in New France in August 1685 and took part in Chevalier Pierre de Troyes successful raid on several English trading posts in the Hudson Bay and James Bay regions from March to October 1686, a military campaign known as the Hudson Bay expedition (1686). He married Marie Ronceray in 1688 in Longueuil, Québec. Antoine's only son, Adrien (1693–1760), was an important businessman and a major figure in the economic development of New France. Adrien in turn had a son by the same name, who was a slave owner and who was killed at the Battle of the Plains of Abraham on September 13, 1759. By the early-to-mid-19th century, the various families descended from Antoine dropped the Fournier part of the surname in favour of Préfontaine. Two brothers from Longueuil, Québec, Alexis and Toussaint Fournier dit Préfontaine, participated in the initial engagement of the Lower Canada Rebellion, the Chambly Road incident of November 17, 1837. The rebels were inspired by the ideals of the American Revolution, republicanism and the desire for responsible and representative government. Alexis, an officer in the militia, resigned his commission the day before joining the Rebellion. When the Rebellion collapsed in November 1838, and after proudly admitting their active participation, even under the possible penalty of death or exile, both brothers were to spend a year in jail along with 1,100 other Patriotes. Two of Toussaint's sons, Raymond and François-Xavier, went on to have notable careers in their respective professions (see below). During the second half of the 19th century, several Préfontaine families emigrated from Québec to New England, the Midwest and the North-West of the United States. Others emigrated to Western Canada, notably to Manitoba and Saskatchewan.

Préfontaine may also refer to:

United States

- Steve Prefontaine (1951-1975), American track athlete
- Monsignor Francis X. Prefontaine (François-Xavier Préfontaine) (1838-1909), Québec-born pioneer priest, businessman and philanthropist who founded Seattle, Washington's first Roman Catholic parish, Our Lady of Good Help in 1867; Seattle's Prefontaine Place, Park and Building are all named after him

Canada

- Raymond Préfontaine (1850-1905), Canadian politician (Québec), was Mayor of the former city of Hochelaga (1879-1883), Mayor of Montréal (1898-1902), and federal Minister of Marine and Fisheries (1902-1905)
  - Préfontaine subway station & nearby street are named after him in Montréal.
- Albert Préfontaine (1862-1935), Canadian politician (Manitoba), leader of the Conservative Party in Manitoba (1916-1919)
- Joseph Préfontaine (1859-1937), Canadian politician (Manitoba)
- Edmond Préfontaine (1898–1971), Canadian politician (Manitoba)
- Fernand Préfontaine (1888-1949), Canadian architect, photographer, art critic
- Claude Préfontaine (1933-2013), Canadian actor
- Jamie Préfontaine (1985-2015), Canadian musician known as Brooklyn with Aboriginal hip hop group Winnipeg's Most
- Yves Préfontaine (1937-2019), Canadian writer
- Stéphane Préfontaine (born 1961), Canadian athlete, lawyer and businessman
- Noël Préfontaine (born 1973), Canadian football player
- Marie-Pier Préfontaine (born 1988), Canadian alpine skier
