= Ershad Sikder =

Bangladeshi criminal and serial killer

- Ershad Shikder in police custody
- Born: 1955; Madargona village, Nalchity Upazila, Bangladesh (Then East Pakistan)
- Died: 10 May 2004 (aged 48–49); Khulna District Jail, Bangladesh
- Cause of death: Execution by hanging
- Other name: "Ranga chora" (White thief)
- Organization: First Jatiyo Party
- Status: Executed
- Convictions: Murder x7 Robbery; Extortion; Theft
- Penalty: Death plus four life sentences

Details
- Victims: 60+
- Span of crimes: 1991–1999
- Country: Bangladesh
- Date apprehended: 1999

Ershad Sikder (Bengali: এরশাদ শিকদার; 1955 – 10 May 2004) was a Bangladeshi politician, criminal, and serial killer, known for committing various crimes such as murder, torture, theft, robbery and others. He was sentenced to death for murder, and subsequently executed on 10 May 2004.

== Biography ==
=== Early life ===
Sikder was born in the Madargona village of Nalchity Upazila, Jhalokati District. His father was Bande Ali. Between 1966 and 1967, Sikder moved from his birthplace to the Khulna District. After arriving in Khulna, Ershad worked as a railway worker for some time. From there, he began gradually robbing along the railway lines and joined a gang. Later, he formed his own gang and earned the name Ranga Chora from the locals.

Between 1976 and 1977, he formed another gang named Ramada Bahini, which was involved in theft, robberies and terrorist activities along the Khulna Railway Station and the Ghat area. Together with his gang, Ershad occupied the 4th and 5th areas of Ghat, making it his exclusive regulator.

=== Entry into politics ===
In 1982, after the rise of former president Hussain Muhammad Ershad, Sikder entered politics through the Jatiya Party. In the 1988 election during the military rule, Sikder was elected as the commissioner of Ward 8. After forming the BNP government in 1991, Sikder joined it. On 26 December 1996, he again changed his party to the Awami League, but soon after being criticized, he was expelled as his relations to killing Khalid Hossain on May 15, 1999, another member of Awami league, was revealed to the public by his right-hand man and bodyguard Rajasakshi Nure Alam. At the time of his 1999 arrest, he was still the commissioner of Ward 8.

=== Criminal acts and murders ===
After entering politics, Sikder's power grew. From 1984 to 1986, he was involved in the possession of Khulna properties, occupying private property, the drug trade, extortion and other criminal activities. In 1991, he drove out the owner of an ice factory named Rafiq, from the 4th Ghat area, appropriated the ice factory and forced all traders to buy ice from him.

It is also known that he used the ice factory as his torture centre. Ershad was accused of more than 60 murders, together with one of his collaborators, state witness Nure Alam. The latter later gave a statement in court describing 24 killings, further claiming that Sikder had more than 70 victims, although only one weapon was recovered from his house, known as the "Swarnakamal".

=== Personal life ===
Sikder was married six times. His first wife was Khodeja Begum, whom he married in 1973. Another wives included Sanjida Akter Shobha, Taslima of Rupsha Rajapur village, Farida of Bagerhat, Rampal Upazila; another unknown wife and Durgargaire of Paikgacha. Nure Alam also alleged that his wife Hira was tortured by Ershad.

Ershad's first wife Khodeja gave birth to three sons and a daughter. After his arrest, a fifth child, a daughter, was to his second wife, Sanjida Nahar Shova. This daughter committed suicide on 4 March 2022 in Gulshan.

== Arrest and death ==
Sikder was arrested in 1999, with 43 cases filed under his name. During a trial at the lower court, he was sentenced to death in seven murder cases, along with additional four life sentences. He tried to appeal against the decision by writing a petition to President Iajuddin Ahmed, but he rejected the appeal, and Sikder was executed at the Khulna Central jail on 10 May 2004. He was imprisoned in Khulna District Jail. Fazlur Rahman, police inspector of Jhikargachha Police Station, bought his house in Khulna. This prompted an investigation by the ministry of Home Affairs in April 2004.

In 2005, former Prime Minister Sheikh Hasina identified the arrest of Sikder as evidence of the judiciary functioning to Asma Jahangir and criticised the government of Bangladesh for using Rapid Action Battalion to kill criminals extrajudicially.

== Popular culture ==
In 2004 a Bangladeshi biographical thriller film, Khuni Shikder, was directed by Monowar Hossain Khokon. Shakib Khan played the titular role of Sikder.

A song by Abdus Sattar Mohonto, titled "Ami To More Jabo" meaning "I will be dead" in Bengali, has been popularized throughout the country as Sikder's song.

Kal Bhairaber Ghat, a book by Indian author Binod Ghoshal, based on the life of Ershad Sikder was published in 2020.

== See also ==
- List of serial killers by country
- List of serial killers by number of victims
