= Blonde Dolly =

Dutch murder victim (1927 – 1959)

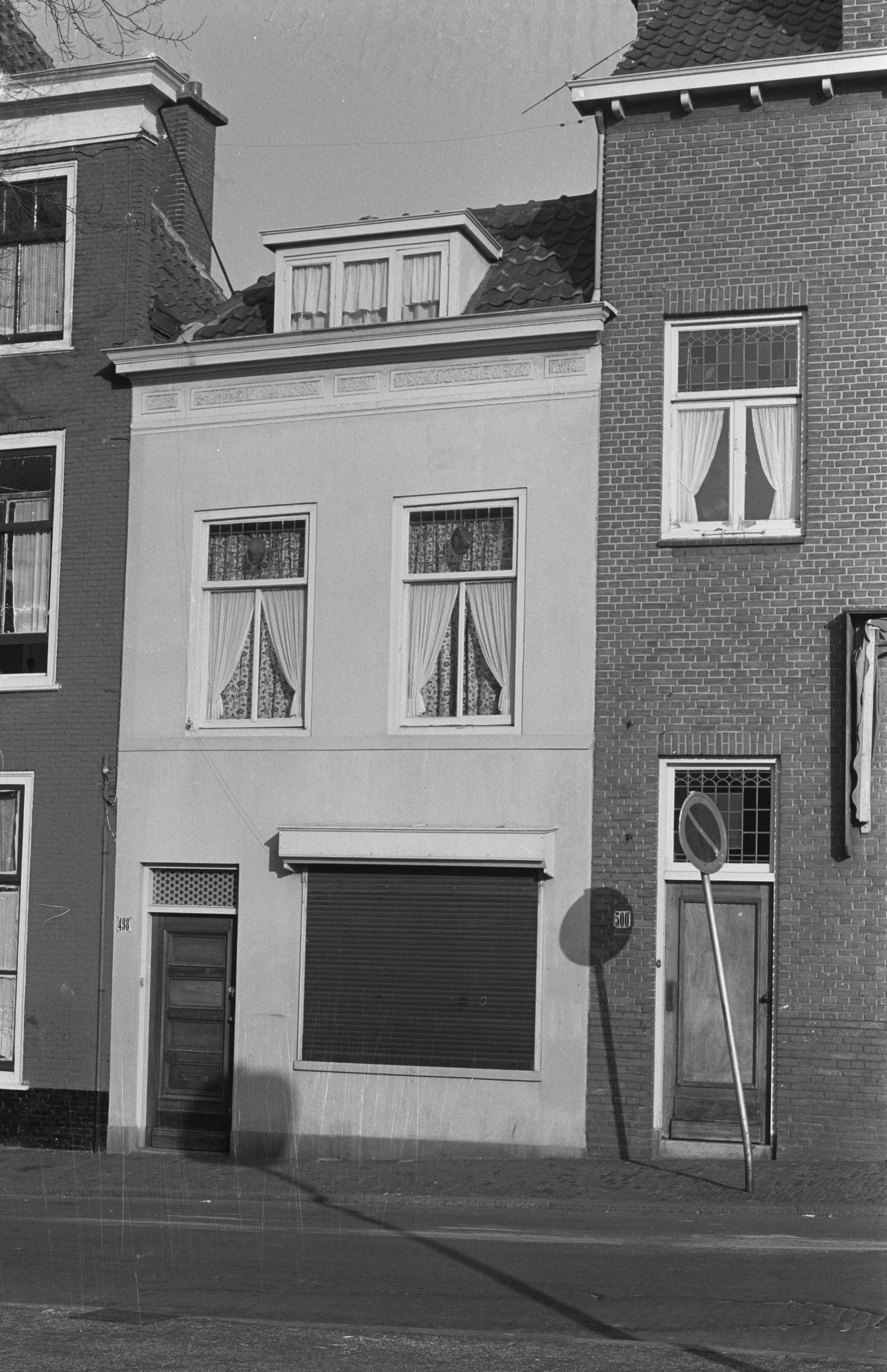
- Blonde Dolly's house in The Hague, photographed after her death.
- Born: Sebilla Alida Johanna Niemans; 27 September 1927; Amsterdam, The Netherlands
- Died: 31 October 1959 (aged 32); The Hague, The Netherlands
- Cause of death: Strangulation
- Body discovered: 2 November 1959
- Resting place: Westduin Cemetery, The Hague
- Other names: Zwart Dolly; Blonde Dolly; Sebilla van den Bergh
- Occupations: prostitute, businesswoman
- Known for: Murder victim
- Spouse: Botto van den Bergh

Sebilla Alida Johanna Niemans (27 September 1927 – 31 October 1959), known as Blonde Dolly, was a Dutch prostitute and businesswoman who was murdered by strangulation. Her murderer was never caught.

== Biography ==
Sebilla Niemans was born in Amsterdam-West on 27 September 1927. Her father, Hendricus Johannes Niemans (born 1899), was a shoemaker; her mother was Sebilla Alida Johanna Streelder (born 1900). When she was young, after her chronically ill mother was admitted to hospital, Niemans and her elder brother were sent to the Groot Kijkduin children's home in Zandvoort. When Nazi Germany occupied the area during the Second World War, Niemans and her brother went back to Amsterdam to live with their father, who by now had become married to a new wife.

As she did not get on with her stepmother, Niemans left home looking for a job and accommodation. Through a fortune teller and a purported Italian sailor who was, in fact, a pimp, she entered prostitution in the Kerkstraat. After being investigated by police, Niemans returned to her father and stepmother and started training in dressmaking.

In 1948, Niemans moved to the Hague, where she returned to prostitution and rented a window at 21 Doubletstraat. She was originally known as Black Dolly (Dutch: Zwarte Dolly) from her dark hair, but later bleached it. In 1950 she purchased a house at 498 Nieuwe Haven.

Later in 1950, Niemans married Botto van den Bergh, a violinist in Hague's Residentie Orchestra. She accompanied her husband when he was travelling with the orchestra, and was introduced to the worlds of classical music, fashion and art; she occasionally worked as a fashion model. However, Niemans's marriage to van den Bergh broke down after a year and, following a lengthy and complex legal procedure, the couple were divorced in 1957.

== Murder ==
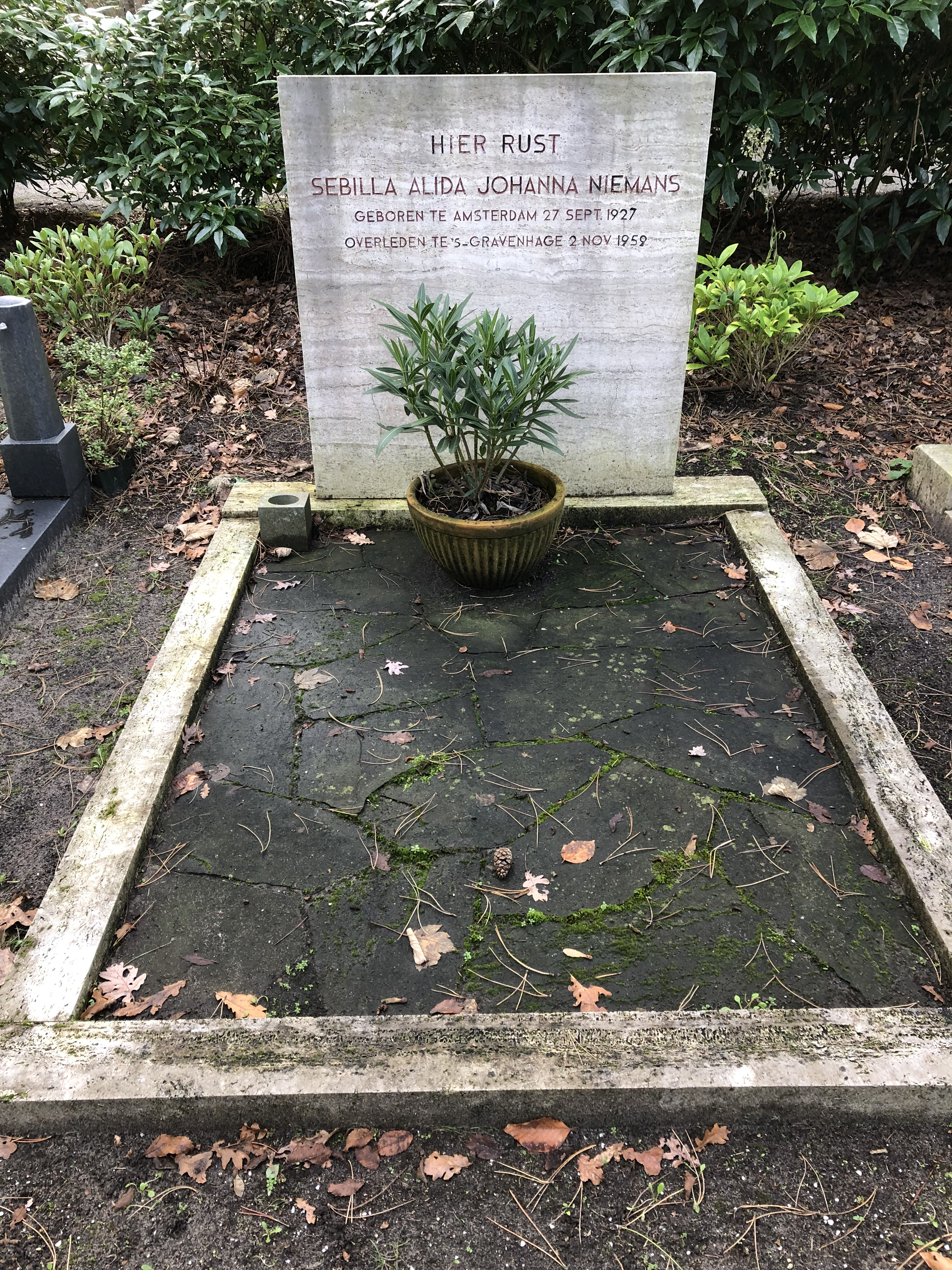
Sebilla Niemans’ grave, Westduin Cemetery, The Hague

Niemans was found dead in bed in her bedroom at 498 Nieuwe Haven on 2 November 1959. It was estimated that she had been strangled on the night of 30-31 October. There were no signs of violence, and a considerable amount of cash was found in the residence by the police. Robbery was ruled out as a motive for the crime.

The murder sparked a considerable stir. There was speculation that Niemans's "blue book", which the police refused to release to the public, contained names of high-ranking regular customers. This caused rumours that one of Niemans's customers was involved in her murder. No evidence to substantiate these rumours was ever presented, nor that of a political cover-up. The international press picked up the case, linking it to the murder in Germany of Rosemarie Nitribitt in 1957, in which there were also allegations of politicians being involved.

The main suspect in the case was a bodyguard named "Gerard V", whose services Niemans had used after another prostitute, Marietje van Es, had been robbed in December 1958. Gerard had fallen in love with Niemans but she had rejected him. He was never charged, and the investigation was closed.

According to the politician Hans Gualthérie van Weezel, his father, the police commissioner Jan Gualthérie van Weezel, knew who had committed the murder. Gualthérie van Weezel Sr. would keep a file on the case at home with the instruction to destroy it after his death. Before carrying out this instruction, his son would have read the name of the perpetrator in the file.

== In popular culture ==
The life and death of Blonde Dolly was incorporated in Michel Dubois' novel Murder on Black Martha (1962), and was portrayed in director Gerrit van Elst's film Blonde Dolly (1987). Casper Postmaa wrote a book about the case. In 2019 appeared Blonde Dolly by Tomas Ross with new details about the murder.

== See also ==
- List of unsolved murders (1900–1979)
