= Blonde Dolly (film) =

1987 film by Gerrit van Elst

- Theatrical release poster
- Directed by: Gerrit van Elst
- Written by: Alma Popeyus, Hein Schütz
- Produced by: Gijs Versluys
- Starring: Hilde Van Mieghem; Peter Tuinman
- Cinematography: Theo Bierkens
- Edited by: Ton Ruys
- Music by: Lucas Asselbergs
- Production company: Riverside Pictures
- Distributed by: Holland Film Releasing
- Release date: 19 February 1987
- Running time: 102 minutes
- Country: Netherlands
- Language: Dutch

Blonde Dolly is a 1987 Dutch drama film about a prostitute who co-finances the purchase of a Vermeer painting, directed by Gerrit van Elst and with Hilde Van Mieghem and Peter Tuinman in the lead roles.

The film is based on the real-life Hague prostitute, Sebilla Alida Johanna Niemans, better known as "Blonde Dolly", who was murdered in 1959. and whose murder remains unsolved. The film received a poor response from critics but was a moderate success in cinemas.

== Plot ==
Prostitute Blonde Dolly has many different facets. Sometimes she is a window prostitute in the red-light district of The Hague, then an expensive model, a call girl and an artist. The director of the Gemeentemuseum in The Hague, Eddy Cremer, becomes obsessed by her. He spies on her and falls in love. The love is mutual and Dolly even meets Eddy's wife. The latter paints a portrait of Dolly on which she is depicted as a femme fatale. The painting is then burned by Dolly. Eddy proposes to go to Paris. He is a connoisseur of paintings and knows how to distinguish fake ones from real ones. In the French capital his eye fell on a painting by Johannes Vermeer that he wants to buy. Dolly becomes co-financier of the purchase, but after the purchase the painting turns out to be a forgery. A rift occurs between Dolly and Eddy over this. When Dolly is back in The Hague, she continues her old life, but notices that her familiar neighborhood has become a lot more restless. Not long afterwards she is murdered in her house. The police are investigating and questioning all of Dolly's known customers, but everyone has an alibi. The police then also discover a more hidden sides of Dolly and that her acquaintances and clients occupy positions in high places. Further investigation does not provide any leads and the case remains unresolved.

== Background ==
=== The facts ===
Sebilla Niemans, born on September 27, 1927, was a famous prostitute in The Hague who went under the pseudonym of 'Blonde Dolly' in the 1940s and 1950s. When she was found murdered in bed on November 2, 1959, a shock went through the Netherlands. It became known that Dolly also had clients in better circles where she also worked as a model and recital artist. She owned real estate and later a large amount of golden dollars were found in her house. There was a rumor that Dolly had a blue diary with the names of high-ranking people who were her customers. This turned out not to be the case later, there was a blue book but it contained nothing controversial. Although the police interviewed many people and did extensive investigations, the case remained unsolved and was closed in 1977.

During the initial investigation, police discovered that Blonde Dolly had deposited ƒ 180,000 (the equivalent of roughly €800,000 today) in a numbered Swiss bank account at Credit Suisse in Zurich. This account, opened under the pseudonym "Sabine de Vries", fuelled persistent rumours that part of her fortune came from blackmailing prominent politicians and businessmen.

=== The fiction ===
Seven different scenarios were explored before a version that the producer and director could continue with. The problem being little was actually known about the murder. Interrogations and files about the murder of Blonde Dolly had not been released in 1986. Nor was a perpetrator found. This meant that the writers could use their imagination. They created a psychological drama around the prostitute Blonde Dolly, who really existed, and the fictional Eddy Cremer. In particular, as both Dolly's life and death were surrounded by mysteries, gave the writers the freedom to speculate. The alleged contacts of Blonde Dolly with high-ranking figures in Dutch society also added a spicy touch to the script. But it remains fiction: the film is not a reconstruction of the murder case.

=== Production ===
Auditions for the film were difficult, and a few days before shooting was due to start, nobody had been chosen for the title role. Actresses such as Renée Soutendijk and Liz Snoyink were approached for the role, but showed no interest. The Belgian actress Hilde Van Mieghem was eventually chosen. The film was a struggle for director Jonne Severijn who was eventually replaced by his assistant director Gerrit van Elst. Filming took place in The Hague in the autumn of 1986.

== Cast ==
Listing from Filmvandaag:

- Hilde Van Mieghem ... Dolly/Sylvia/Kitty
- Peter Tuinman ... Eddy Cremer
- Fred Vaassen ... Vaclav
- Adrian Brine ... Baron Tuft
- Piet Kamerman ... Debrie
- Herbert Flack ... Ambassadeur
- Wilbert Gieske ... Karel
- Priscilla Visser ... Anita
- Con Meyer ... Adje
- Celia Nufaar ... Moeder
- Suzanne Colin ... Galeriehoudster
- Stef Feld ... Fietser
- Laus Steenbeke ... Jongen met mes
