= List of German-language films =

This is a list of films in the German language. For a more comprehensive list see Category:German-language films

- 10 Sekunden, 2008
- 2030 – Aufstand der Alten, 2007
- 2030 – Aufstand der Jungen, 2010
- 3 Engel für Ali, 2003
- 89 Millimeter, 2005
- Ab Morgen, 2011, a short film
- Abschied von gestern, 1966
- Absolute Giganten (Gigantic), 1999
- Advertising Rules! (Viktor Vogel – Commercial Man), 2001
- Agnes and His Brothers (Agnes und seine Brüder), 2004
- Aguirre: The Wrath of God (Aguirre, der Zorn Gottes), 1972
- Aimée and Jaguar (Aimée und Jaguar), 1999
- The American Friend (Der amerikanische Freund), 1977
- Der amerikanische Soldat, 1970
- Anatomy, 2000
- The Baader Meinhof Complex, 2008
- Barfuss, 2005
- Berlin Blues (Herr Lehmann), 2003
- Der bewegte Mann (Maybe, Maybe Not), 1994
- The Bitter Tears of Petra von Kant (Die Bitteren Tränen der Petra von Kant), 1972
- The Blindflyers (Die Blindgänger), 2004
- The Blue Light (Das Blaue Licht), 1932
- Blueprint, 2003
- Das Boot, 1981 (150 minutes; Director's Cut of 1997: 208 minutes)
- The Cabinet of Dr. Caligari (Das Cabinet des Dr. Caligari), 1920
- Coming Home (Mein Vater), 2003
- Coming Out, 1989
- Christiane F. (Christiane F. - Wir Kinder vom Bahnhof Zoo), 1981
- Day 26 (Tag 26), 2002, a short film
- Deutschland im Jahre Null, 1948
- Distant Lights (Lichter), 2003
- Doctor Praetorius (Frauenarzt Dr. Prätorius), 1950
- Downfall (Der Untergang)
- The Edukators (Die fetten Jahre sind vorbei)
- Elementarteilchen (Atomized)
- Finsterworld, 2013
- En Route (Unterwegs)
- The Enigma of Kaspar Hauser (Jeder für sich und Gott gegen alle)
- Enlightenment Guaranteed (Erleuchtung garantiert, 2000)
- Das Erdbeben in Chili, 1975
- Europa, 1991
- Even Dwarfs Started Small (Auch Zwerge haben klein angefangen, 1970)
- Das Experiment, 2001
- Felidae, 1994
- Fack ju Göhte, 2013
- Fack ju Göhte 2, 2015
- Faust (Faust – eine deutsche Volkssage), 1926
- Fear Eats the Soul (Angst essen Seele auf), 1974
- Das Fest des Huhnes (Festival of the Chicken), 1992
- Fitzcarraldo, 1982
- Flügel und Fesseln, 1984
- Football Under Cover, 2008
- Four for Venice (2 Männer, 2 Frauen - 4 Probleme!?)
- Germany, Pale Mother (Deutschland bleiche Mutter, 1980)
- Getting My Brother Laid (Mein Bruder, der Vampir)
- Go for Zucker! (Alles auf Zucker!)
- The Goalkeeper's Fear of the Penalty, 1972
- Good Bye Lenin!
- Götter der Pest, 1970
- Grave Decisions (Wer früher stirbt ist länger tot), 2006
- Grosse Freiheit Nr. 7, 1944
- Harte Jungs, 2000
- Head-On (Gegen die Wand)
- Heart of Glass
- Heimat (Heimat - Eine deutsche Chronik), 1984;
  - Leaving Home (Die Zweite Heimat - Chronik einer Jugend), 1992;
  - Heimat 3 - Chronik einer Zeitenwende, 2004
- Heller Wahn, 1983
- Hippie Masala, 2006
- Hitler, ein Film aus Deutschland, 1977
- Hundstage, 2001
- If It Don't Fit, Use a Bigger Hammer, 2002
- Im toten Winkel
- In July (Im Juli, 2000)
- In Diesem Moment (Im Dec, 2013)
- Journey Into Bliss
- Der junge Törless
- Katze im Sack
- Katzelmacher, 1969
- Klassenverhältnisse
- Kleinruppin forever, 2004
- Lammbock, 2001
- L'Animale, 2018
- Lessons of Darkness (Lektionen in Finsternis, 1992)
- The Lives of Others (Das Leben der Anderen)
- Liebe ist kälter als der Tod, 1969
- Life is All You Get (Das Leben ist eine Baustelle, 1997)
- Lola, 1981
- Love in Thoughts (Was nützt die Liebe in Gedanken)
- Lulu, 1962
- M, 1931
- The Legend of Paul and Paula (Die Legende von Paul und Paula)
- The Man (Der Typ)
- Men Like Us (Männer wie wir)
- The Marriage of Maria Braun (Die Ehe der Maria Braun)
- Mein Herz – niemandem!, 1997
- Mephisto, 1981
- The Miracle of Bern (Das Wunder von Bern)
- Mostly Martha (Bella Marta)
- The Net (Das Netz)
- Netto
- Nightsongs (Die Nacht singt ihre Lieder)
- No Mercy, No Future (Die Berührte), 1981
- Nowhere in Africa (Nirgendwo in Afrika)
- Oi! Warning, 1999
- Pappa ante Portas, 1991
- The Princess and the Warrior (Der Krieger und die Kaiserin)
- Das Versprechen, 1995
- The Red Jacket (Die rote Jacke)
- Toni Erdmann, 2016
- Razzia in Sankt Pauli, 1932
- Requiem, 2006
- Roma città aperta, 1945
- Rosa Luxemburg, 1986
- Rosenstrasse
- Run Lola Run (Lola rennt)
- Die Scheinheiligen
- Das schreckliche Mädchen (The Nasty Girl) 1989
- Schultze Gets the Blues
- Schwestern oder Die Balance des Glücks, 1979
- Die Sehnsucht der Veronika Voss, 1982
- Sonnenallee
- Sophie Scholl: The Final Days (Sophie Scholl – Die letzten Tage)
- The Sons of the Great Mother Bear (Die Söhne der großen Bärin)
- Soul Kitchen 2009
- Stroszek
- Summer Storm (Sommersturm, 2004)
- The Tin Drum (Die Blechtrommel, 1979)
- The Third Generation (Die Dritte Generation, 1979)
- This Very Moment (Milchwald)
- Triumph of the Will (Triumph des Willens), 1935
- Tornado (2007)
- Unsichtbare Gegner, 1977
- Unter dem Pflaster ist der Strand, 1975
- Verfolgt, 2006
- Warnung vor einer heiligen Nutte, 1971
- Die Welle (The Wave), 2008
- What To Do In Case Of Fire (Was Tun, Wenn's Brennt)
- When We Leave (Die Fremde, 2010)
- Das wilde Leben
- Who Am I – No System Is Safe (Who Am I – Kein System ist sicher, 2014)
- Wings of Desire (Himmel über Berlin)
- Das zweite Erwachen der Christa Klages, 1978
