= List of drama films of the 1980s =

This is a list of drama films of the 1980s.

== 1980 ==
- Altered States
- The Blue Lagoon
- Breaker Morant
- Coal Miner's Daughter
- The Elephant Man
- Germany Pale Mother
- The Great Santini
- Honeysuckle Rose
- Kagemusha
- The Last Metro
- Ordinary People
- Playing for Time
- Raging Bull
- The Resurrection
- Urban Cowboy
- Who's That Singing Over There
- Zigeunerweisen

== 1981 ==
- Absence of Malice
- Adaptatziya
- Atlantic City
- Die Berührte
- Chariots of Fire
- The Circle of Deceit
- Endless Love
- Lola
- Man of Iron
- Marianne and Juliane
- Masada
- Mephisto
- Mommie Dearest
- On Golden Pond
- Pixote
- Le Pont du Nord
- The Postman Always Rings Twice
- Prince of the City
- Ragtime
- Skokie
- Smash Palace
- Three Brothers
- The Wave
- Zigeunerweisen

== 1982 ==
- The Angel
- Another Way
- Boat People
- Fanny and Alexander
- First Blood
- The Grey Fox
- Macbeth
- Little Gloria... Happy at Last
- Missing
- Moonlighting
- Napló gyermekeimnek
- The Night of the Shooting Stars
- Przesluchanie
- A Question of Silence
- Sophie's Choice
- That Night in Varennes
- The Verdict
- Veronika Voss
- Wend Kuuni
- The Year of Living Dangerously
- Yol

== 1983 ==
- 10 to Midnight
- À nos amours
- L'Argent
- The Ballad of Narayama
- Betrayal
- Entre Nous
- Makioka Sisters
- Le Mur
- My Brother's Wedding
- El Norte
- One Deadly Summer
- The Right Stuff
- Scarface
- Sheer Madness
- Silkwood
- Sweet Bunch
- Tender Mercies
- Terms of Endearment
- Testament
- WarGames

== 1984 ==
- Amadeus
- Annie's Coming Out
- The Element of Crime
- Flügel und Fesseln
- The Home and the World
- The Killing Fields
- Klassenverhältnisse
- Macross: Do You Remember Love?
- Moi Drug Ivan Lapshin
- Nineteen Eighty-Four
- Once Upon a Time in America
- Paris, Texas
- A Passage to India
- Places in the Heart
- The Razor's Edge
- Secret Honor
- A Soldier's Story
- A Sunday in the Country
- Threads
- The Year of the Quiet Sun
- Yellow Earth

== 1985 ==
- Adiós, Roberto
- The Color Purple
- Enemy Mine
- Kiss of the Spider Woman
- Ladyhawke
- The Legend of Suram Fortress
- Man Hunt
- Ran
- St. Elmo's Fire
- That Was Then... This Is Now
- Witness

== 1986 ==
- Blood & Orchids (TV)
- Children of a Lesser God
- Heartburn
- Jean de Florette
- Loyalties
- Ménage
- Mona Lisa
- A Promise
- A Room with a View
- Round Midnight
- Salvador
- Shadows in Paradise
- Stand by Me
- Tras el cristal

== 1987 ==
- 84 Charing Cross Road
- Babette's Feast
- Bagdad Café
- Business as Usual
- Full Metal Jacket
- Morning Patrol
- Nayakan

== 1988 ==
- 1969
- A Dos Aguas
- A sega nakade?
- The Accidental Tourist
- The Accused
- Ariel
- Ashik Kerib
- The Attic: The Hiding of Anne Frank
- Bright Lights, Big City
- Celia
- Cinema Paradiso
- Clean and Sober
- Dangerous Liaisons
- Dead Ringers
- Fun Down There
- Grave of the Fireflies
- The Land Before Time
- Mississippi Burning
- Open from 18 to 24
- Pelle the Conqueror
- Rain Man
- Salaam Bombay!
- Story of Women
- The Unbearable Lightness of Being

== 1989 ==
- Black Rain
- City of Sadness
- Dead Poets Society
- Do the Right Thing
- Drugstore Cowboy
- Field of Dreams
- Monsieur Hire
- Piravi
- Prancer
- Sex, Lies, and Videotape
