= Earthquake in Chile =

Earthquake in Chile may refer to:

- The Earthquake in Chile, an 1807 novella by Heinrich von Kleist
- Earthquake in Chile (film), a 1975 West German television drama film, an adaptation of the novella

== See also ==
- List of earthquakes in Chile
