= Where Do We Go from Here =

Where Do We Go from Here may refer to:

== Film and television ==
- Where Do We Go from Here? (1945 film), an American film directed by Gregory Ratoff
- Where Do We Go from Here? (2015 film), a Scottish film directed by John McPhail
- OWN Spotlight: Where Do We Go From Here?, a television special by Oprah Winfrey

== Literature ==
- Where Do We Go from Here? (novel) or Does Anyone Ever Listen?, a 1998 young-adult novel by Rosie Rushton
- Where Do We Go from Here: Chaos or Community?, a 1967 book by Martin Luther King Jr.
- Where Do We Go from Here? (anthology), a 1971 science fiction anthology edited by Isaac Asimov
- Where Do We Go from Here?, a 1938 Broadway play by Dwight Taylor
- "Where Do We Go from Here?", an essay by Willy Ley in SF '58: The Year's Greatest Science Fiction and Fantasy

== Music ==
=== Albums ===
- Where Do We Go from Here? (Asking Alexandria album), 2023
- Where Do We Go From Here, by Dumpstaphunk, 2021
- Where Do We Go from Here (album), by Pillar, 2004
- Where Do We Go from Here? (Kenny Wheeler & John Taylor album) or the title song, 2004
- Where Do We Go from Here, by Michael Damian, 1989

=== Songs ===
- "Where Do We Go from Here?" (1917 song), written by Howard Johnson and Percy Wenrich
- "Where Do We Go from Here?" (Agnetha Fältskog song), 2023
- "Where Do We Go from Here?" (Chicago song), 1970
- "Where Do We Go from Here" (Cliff Richard song), 1982
- "Where Do We Go from Here" (Deborah Cox song), 1996
- "Where Do We Go from Here" (Filter song), 2002
- "Where Do We Go from Here" (Hank Smith song), 1971
- "Where Do We Go from Here" (Stacy Lattisaw song), 1989
- "Where Do We Go from Here" (Vanessa Williams song), 1996
- "Where Do We Go from Here", by Alicia Keys from As I Am, 2007
- "Where Do We Go from Here?", by The Band from Cahoots, 1971
- "Where Do We Go from Here", by Charles Bradley from Victim of Love, 2013
- "Where Do We Go from Here", by Chris Rene, 2011
- "Where Do We Go from Here?", by Enchantment from Journey to the Land Of... Enchantment, 1979
- "Where Do We Go from Here?", by Jamiroquai from Synkronized, 1999
- "Where Do We Go from Here?", by the Partridge Family from Bulletin Board, 1973
- "Where Do We Go from Here", by Svenstrup & Vendelboe from Svenstrup & Vendelboe, 2012
- "Where Do We Go from Here?", by Yoko Ono from Rising, 1995
- "Where Do We Go from Here?", from the TV series Buffy the Vampire Slayer, in the episode "Once More, With Feeling", 2001
- "Where Do We Go from Here (Interlude)", by Tupac Shakur from R U Still Down? (Remember Me), 1997

== See also ==
- A sega nakade?, a 1988 Bulgarian film with the English title And Where Do We Go from Here?
