= Gottfried Benn =

German writer and physician (1886–1956)

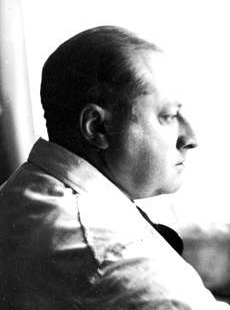
- Benn in 1934
- Born: 2 May 1886; Mansfeld, German Empire
- Died: 7 July 1956 (aged 70); West Berlin, West Germany
- Education: Marburg University; Friedrich Wilhelm University of Berlin; Kaiser Wilhelm Academy (MD)
- Occupations: Physician, pathologist, poet

Gottfried Benn (2 May 1886 – 7 July 1956) was a German poet, essayist, and physician. He was awarded the Georg Büchner Prize in 1951.

== Biography and work ==
=== Family and beginnings ===
Gottfried Benn was born in a Lutheran country parsonage, a few hours from Berlin, the son and grandson of pastors in Mansfeld, now part of Putlitz in the district of Prignitz, Brandenburg. He was educated in Sellin in the Neumark and Frankfurt an der Oder. To please his father, he studied theology at the University of Marburg and military medicine at the Kaiser Wilhelm Academy in Berlin. After being laid off as a military doctor in 1912, Benn turned to pathology, where he dissected over 200 bodies between October 1912 and November 1913 in Berlin. Many of his literary works reflect on his time as a pathologist.

In the summer of 1912, Benn started a romantic relationship with the Jewish poet Else Lasker-Schüler.

Gottfried Benn began his literary career as a poet when he published a booklet titled Morgue and Other Poems in 1912, containing expressionist poems dealing with physical decay of flesh, with blood, cancer, and death — for example No III — Cycle:

Der einsame Backzahn einer Dirne, / die unbekannt verstorben war, / trug eine Goldplombe. / Die übrigen waren wie auf stille Verabredung / ausgegangen. / Den schlug der Leichendiener sich heraus, / versetzte ihn und ging für tanzen. / Denn, sagte er, / nur Erde solle zur Erde werden.

— Gottfried Benn

The solitary molar of a hooker, / who had died a missing person, / held a gold filling. / As if by silent agreement, the rest / had fallen out. / The mortician knocked out the filling, / pawned it and went dancing. / Because, he said, / only earth should return to earth.

— Natias Neutert with David Paisey

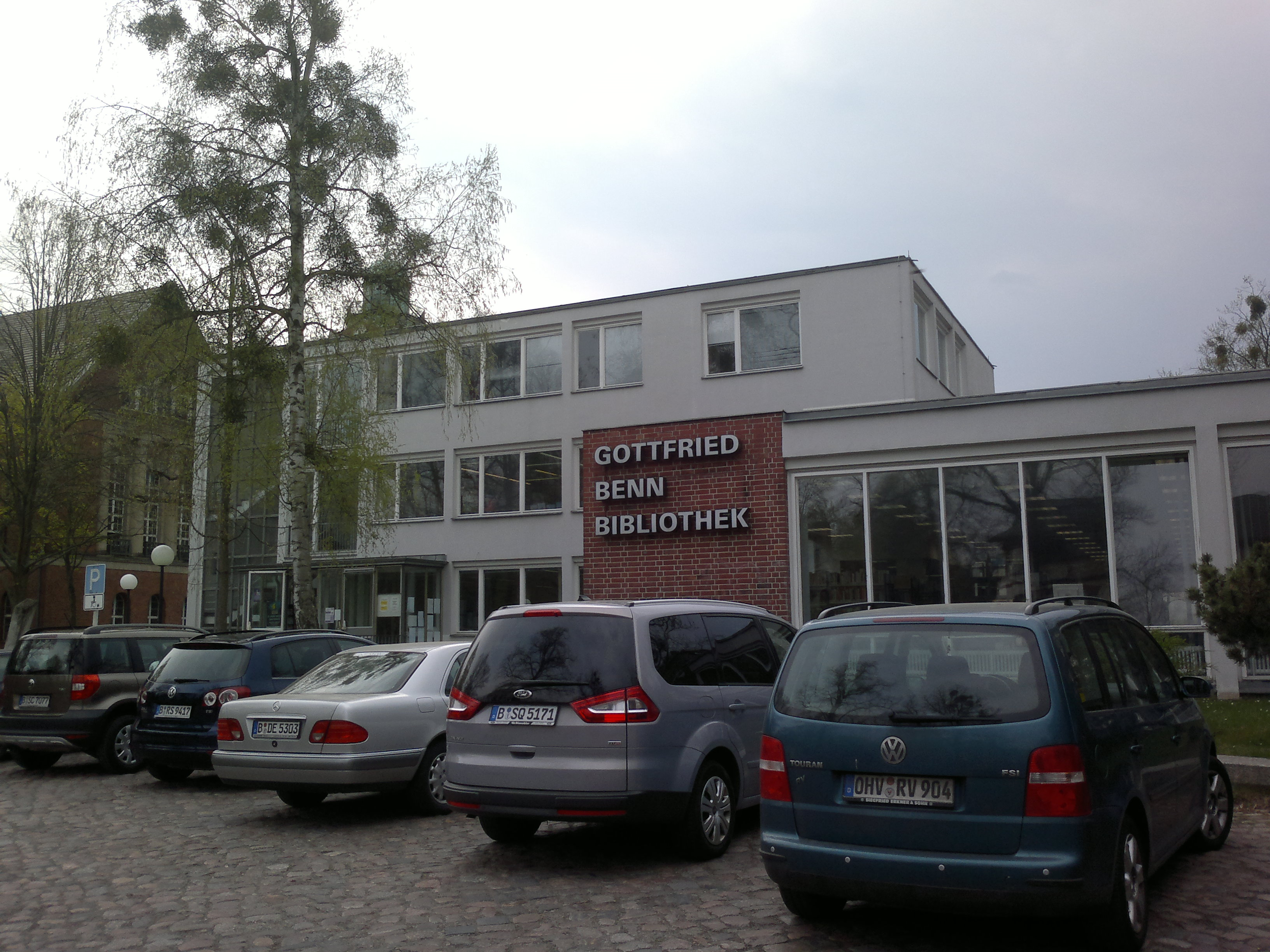
Library in Berlin named after Gottfried Benn

Poems like this "were received by critics and public with shock, dismay, even revulsion." In 1913 a second volume of poems came out, titled Sons. New Poems.

Benn's poetry projects an introverted nihilism, that is, an existentialist outlook that views artistic expression as the only purposeful action. In his early poems Benn used his medical experience, often using medical terminology, to portray humanity morbidly as just another species of disease-ridden animal.

=== World War I and Weimar Republic ===
After the outbreak of World War I he enlisted in 1914, and spent a brief period on the Belgian front, then served as a military doctor in Brussels. Benn attended the court-martial and execution of Nurse and British spy Edith Cavell. He also worked as a physician in a hospital for prostitutes. After the war, he returned to Berlin and practiced as a dermatologist and venereal disease specialist.

During the 1920s, he continued having a close relationship with Jewish poet Else Lasker-Schüler who addressed love poems to him. This bond to her is the subject of the film Mein Herz-niemandem (1997) by Helma Sanders-Brahms.

=== During the Third Reich ===
Hostile to the Weimar Republic, and rejecting Marxism and Americanism, Benn was upset with ongoing economic and political instability, and sympathized for a short period with the Nazis, whom he incorrectly saw as a Conservative Revolutionary force. He hoped that National Socialism would exalt his aesthetics and that expressionism would become the official art of Germany, as Futurism had become in Italy. Benn was elected to the poetry section of the Prussian Academy in 1932 and appointed head of that section in February 1933. In May, he defended the new regime in a radio broadcast, saying "the German workers are better off than ever before." He later signed the Gelöbnis treuester Gefolgschaft, that is, the "vow of most faithful allegiance" to Adolf Hitler.

The cultural policy of the new State did not turn out the way he hoped, and in June Hans Friederich Blunck replaced Benn as head of the academy's poetry section. Appalled by the Night of the Long Knives, Benn turned away from the Nazis. He lived quietly, refraining from public criticism of the Nazi Party, but stated in a letter that recent events "gave me the final push [away from the regime]" and that the situation was a "dreadful tragedy". He decided to perform "the aristocratic form of emigration" and joined the Wehrmacht in 1935, where he found many officers sympathetic to his disapproval of the régime. In May 1936 the SS magazine Das Schwarze Korps attacked his expressionist and experimental poetry as degenerate, Jewish, and homosexual. In the summer of 1937, Wolfgang Willrich, a member of the SS, lampooned Benn in his book Säuberung des Kunsttempels; Heinrich Himmler, however, stepped in to reprimand Willrich and defended Benn on the grounds of his good record since 1933 (his earlier artistic output being irrelevant). In 1938 the Reichsschrifttumskammer banned Benn from further writing.

=== After the war ===
During World War II, Benn was posted to garrisons in eastern Germany where he wrote poems and essays. After the war, his work was banned by the Allies because of his initial support for Hitler. In 1951 he was awarded the Georg Büchner Prize. In 1953 he released the poem Nur zwei Dinge, which appeared in the Benn's collection of poems Destillationen. He died of cancer in West Berlin in 1956, and was buried in Waldfriedhof Dahlem, Berlin.

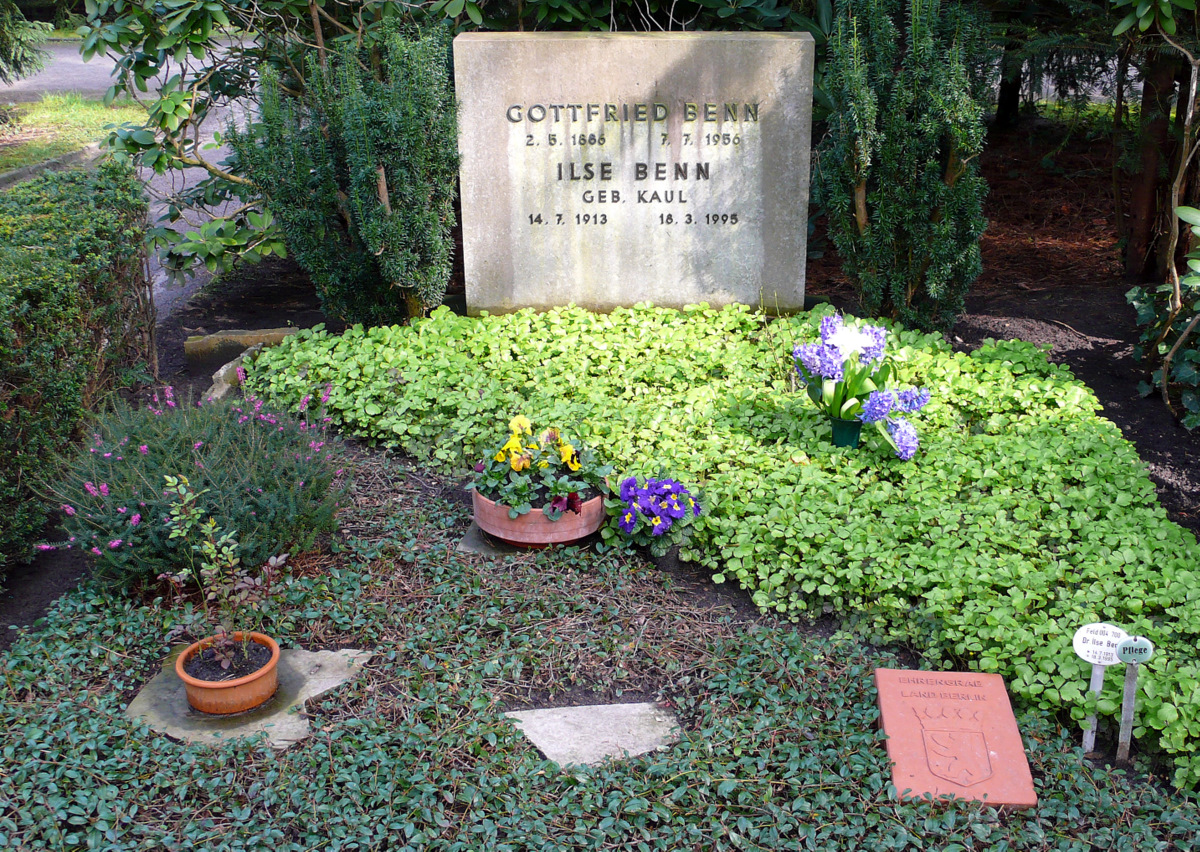
Benn's tomb in Berlin

== Reception ==
Benn had a great influence on German poetry immediately before World War I (as an expressionist), as well as after World War II (as the 'Static' poet). He was submitted for consideration for the Nobel Prize in Literature five times.

== Books ==
- Morgue und andere Gedichte [Morgue and other Poems] (Berlin, 1912)
- Fleisch (1917)
- Die Gesammelten Schriften [The collected works] (Berlin, 1922)
- Schutt (1924)
- Betäubung (1925)
- Spaltung (1925)
- Nach dem Nihilismus (Berlin, 1932)
- Der Neue Staat und die Intellektuellen (1933)
- Kunst und Macht (1935)
- Ausgewählte Gedichte [Selected Poems] (May 1936) Note: 1st edition contained two poems that were removed for the 2nd edition in November 1936: 'Mann und Frau gehen durch die Krebsbaracke' and 'D-Zug'. The vast majority of the 1st editions were collected and destroyed.
- Statische Gedichte [Static poems] (Zürich, 1948)
- Ptolemäer (Limes, 1949); Ptolemy's Disciple (edited, translated and with a preface by Simona Draghici), Plutarch Press, 2005, ISBN 978-0-943045-20-7 (pbk).
- Doppelleben (1950); autobiography translated as Double Life (edited, translated, and with a preface by Simona Draghici, Plutarch Press, 2002, ISBN 978-0-943045-19-1).
- Stimme hinter dem Vorhang; translated as The Voice Behind the Screen (translated with an introduction by Simona Draghici (Plutarch Press, 1996, ISBN 978-0-943045-10-8).

=== Collections ===
- Sämtliche Werke ("Stuttgarter Ausgabe"), ed. by Gerhard Schuster and Holger Hof, 7 volumes in 8 parts, (Stuttgart 1986–2003, ISBN 978-3-608-95313-8).
- Prose, Essays, Poems by Gottfried Benn, edited by Volkmar Sander; introduction by Reinhard Paul Becker (Continuum International Publishing Group, 1987, ISBN 978-0-8264-0310-0 & ISBN 978-0-8264-0311-7 (pbk.)
- Selected Poems (Clarendon German series) by Gottfried Benn (Oxford U.P., 1970, ISBN 978-0-19-832451-5)
- Gottfried Benn in Transition by Gottfried Benn, edited by Simona Draghici (Plutarch Press, 2003, ISBN 978-0-943045-21-4)
- Poems, 1937–1947 (Plutarch Press, 1991, ISBN 978-0-943045-06-1)
- Impromptus (Farrar, Straus and Giroux, 2013, ISBN 978-0-374-17537-5)
- Gottfried Benn – Friedrich Wilhelm Oelze: Briefwechsel 1932–1956, edited by Harald Steinhagen, Stephan Kraft and Holger Hof, 4 volumes, (Klett-Cotta/Wallstein, ISBN 978-3-8353-1826-7)
