= Atmosphere (architecture and spatial design) =

Mood, situation, or sensorial qualities of a space

In architecture, spatial design, literary theory, and film theory—affective atmosphere (colloquially called atmosphere) refers to the mood, situation, or sensorial qualities of a space. Spaces containing atmosphere are shaped through subjective and intersubjective interactions with the qualia of the architecture. Atmosphere (or projected affect) is linked with anthropology, architectural theory, critical theory, cultural geography, phenomenology of architecture, and pragmatism.

== Overview ==
Atmosphere is an immediate form of physical perception, and is recognised through emotional sensibility. Architects and designers use the notion of atmosphere to argue that architecture and space are designed and built for people to use and experience.

[Architectural atmospheres are] this singular density and mood, this feeling of presence, well-being, harmony, beauty...under whose spell I experience what I otherwise would not experience in precisely this way.

— Peter Zumthor

Vitruvius noted that since the human body is the measure of architecture, it is also that which determines atmospheric qualities. It is the human body that emanates the structural qualities of architecture. Drawing from Vitruvius' discussion of architecture, a number of twentieth-century architects have adopted a phenomenological interpretation of their work, to understand architecture's primary concern as the body in space. Among these architects include; Peter Zumthor, Steven Holl and Juhani Pallasmaa. Their architectural works draw from the philosophical tradition of Maurice Merleau-Ponty and Martin Heidegger, the correlation of the body and its sensory-motor functions. Merleau-Ponty in Phenomenology of Perception asserts that, "the body and mind cannot be separated as subject and object". The Spinozistic perception of the mode of body influences what is perceived by the mind.

German philosopher Gernot Böhme has also expanded on the architectural atmosphere, in his essay "Atmosphere as the Subject Matter of Architecture". He addresses the nature of space as the physicality of an actual space and the atmospheric qualities that are embedded within a space. Böhme states that "we must be physically present" (p. 402) to experience space in its complete entirety. By inhabiting space individuals can sense the character that surrounds them. Inhabitants sense its atmosphere. Photography, written articles and the interpretation of other viewers of a space cannot compare to individual experience and interaction in interior spaces. Spaces begin as voids, tangible and undefined structures, their atmospheres are articulated through cognitive subjects (memory, perception, judgement, emotion) and physical presence. Recently an Italian philosopher Tonino Griffero addresses the theory of atmospheres in a thorough and systematic way, examining the role of atmospheres (underestimated in traditional aesthetics) in daily life and their main ontological and phenomenological characteristics, and aims to consider atmospheric feelings and moods (including pain, shame, twilight, gaze, felt-bodily isles, etc.) as prototypes of the new ontological category of quasi-things.

== In psychopathology ==
Space that takes on an affective character is what Ludwig Binswanger called space with an atmosphere.

== Features of architectural atmospheres ==
Several aspects of architectural and spatial design have been identified as contributing to atmosphere:

=== Light ===
Light that fills a room can give the impression of a space being serene, exhilarating, gloomy, celebratory or creepy. Spaces are experienced by the mood transmitted within. Peter Zumthor describes his interest in light, which is crucial in creating atmospheres within his architecture – “…Daylight, the light on things, is so moving to me that I feel almost a spiritual quality. When the sun comes up in the morning – which I always find so marvelous… and casts its light on things, it doesn’t feel as if it quite belongs in this world. I don’t understand light. It gives me the feeling there’s something beyond me, something beyond all understanding” (Atmospheres, p. 61).

Böhme outlines the concept; that stage design, like architecture provokes emotions and atmosphere. This sense of atmosphere is enhanced “not only of objects, wall and solids, but also of light, sound, colour…” Japanese novelist Junichiro Tanizaki in his book In Praise of Shadows describes atmospheres poetically, through space and light within Japanese thought and practice of inhabiting in variations of darkness. “An empty space… a mere shadow, we are overcome with the feeling that in this small corner of the atmosphere there reigns complete and utter silence; that here in the darkness immutable tranquillity holds sway” (p. 33). The mystery and ambiguity of shadows created by light are primary atmospheric conditions of interior spaces.

The relationship between light and architecture occurs inevitably. Light, depending on how it is used can transform the spatial context. It can make a space seem pleasant or unpleasant, moving or ambiguous, light also plays with scale or it could be used simply to highlight elements within a space. Light makes space more enjoyable, comfortable, inhabitable and visible.

=== Object ===
Jean Baudrillard in The System of Objects used the term ‘atmosphere’ within the context of interior design to refer to the status image of consumption. The functional interior design, in Baudrillard’s description, is created of the combination of objects. This gives interior design its function. Objects within a space are constructed rather than inherent. Objects determine spaces of place. The objects placed in an interior create a certain atmosphere sought by the inhabitant. Objects act as replacements, products of mass production. Putting objects in a space is a means of expressing yourself. Thus the interior, through a series of cultural connotations takes on its ‘atmospheric’ qualities, where the term is used to describe a personal expression of status.

Peter Zumthor’s view on objects within a space is that – “The idea of things that have nothing to do with me as an architect taking their place in a building, their rightful place… It’s a great help to me to imagine the future of rooms in a house I am building, to imagine them actually in use” (Atmospheres, p. 39). Objects in a space give a sense of identity and expressiveness to place. Objects can acquire both tangible and intangible qualities, for example; an idea, memory, colour, furniture, smell, light and texture. These are all atmospheric features present within architecture.

=== Air ===
Air encapsulates buildings. Building are said to be alive. By inhabitation, life is given to interior spaces through imagination and presence. Air in buildings forms an atmosphere. Steven Connor in his essay "Building Breathing Space" states, “Like the sky, space [is] mobile, mutable, perturbed, polymorphous, subject to stress, strain and fatigue. The most important agitations of space [are] sound, heat and odour" (p. 3). Connor expresses that these agitations are carried by air and fill space. Buildings defend and sustain their interiority; air creates an apparent atmosphere within architecture.

=== Materials ===
Materials create architectural atmospheres. Materials can be transformed in multiple ways to obtain certain atmospherics in architecture and spaces. For example a stone can be split, cut, sawed, drilled, polished and with each process it will have a different quality. Materials are also combined with other materials in a building that play with texture, colour, temperature and tone; all of which create an atmosphere and mood. For Zumthor, “Materials react with one another and have their radiance, so that the material composition gives rise to something unique. Material is endless” (Atmospheres, p. 25).

=== Sound ===
Peter Zumthor outlines that, “Interiors are like large instruments, collecting sound, amplifying it, transmitting it elsewhere. That has to do with the shape peculiar to each room and with the surface of materials they contain, and the way those materials have been applied.” (Atmospheres, p. 29). Sounds are associated with certain rooms, places and memories. Empty spaces still produce sound through the stillness and silence of scale and materials. Sound in architecture is heard through physical presence and sensitivity. Sound induces emotional and sensual responses. Material, scale, memory and familiarity all create a sense of sound inside a building. It is up to individuals within a space to identify and associate with the sounds present. Sound is both a tangible and intangible sensational atmospheric quality. It allows the individual to physically hear, as well as feel and sense the characteristics present in architecture.

== Notable figures ==
- Mikel Dufrenne
- Gernot Böhme
- Karl Marx
- Brian Massumi
- Nigel Thrift
- Teresa Brennan
- Sianne Ngai
- Peter Sloterdijk
- Bruno Latour
- Teju Cole
- Bruno Zevi

== See also ==
- Aether (classical element)
- Affect theory
- Āyatana
- Celestial spheres
- Cognitive map
- Contextual architecture
- Élan vital
- Gaia hypothesis
- Installation art
- Interior design
- Interior architecture
- Phenomenology (philosophy)
- Phenomenology (sociology)
- Philosophical anthropology
- Set and setting
- Social environment
- Spatial design
- The Symbolic
