= Nur zwei Dinge =

1953 poem by Gottfried Benn

"Nur zwei Dinge" is a poem by the German poet Gottfried Benn. It is dated 7 January 1953 and was first published in the Frankfurt edition of the Neue Zeitung on 26 March 1953. In May of the same year, it appeared in Benn's collection of poems Destillationen. The last volume published by Benn himself, the Collected Poems from 1956, the year of his death, concludes with Only Two Things before the lyrical Epilogue.

The poem looks back on a life in a you-speech, poses the question of meaning and finds the answer in enduring the predetermined. After the insight into general transience, the poem concludes with a juxtaposition of emptiness and the drawn self. In contrast to the abstract, nihilistic statements is the closed and catchy form of the poem, which is characterized by traditional stylistic devices. The cipher-like formulas allow for ambiguous interpretations. "Nur zwei Dinge" is one of Gottfried Benn's most popular poems and has also been understood as his personal life balance.

== Contents ==
The first verse of the three-stanza poem reads:

„Through so many forms,
through I and we and you,
but everything was still suffering from the eternal question: what for?"

This is described as a child's question. It was only late in the day that the you of the poem realized what had to be endured in life:

„your distant destiny: You must."

In view of the general transience, for which roses, snow and oceans are mentioned as examples, the conclusion remains:

„There are only two things:
emptiness and the drawn self."

== Form ==
Structure of the poem
Verse	Metric	Reim
1	υ – υ – υ υ – υ	a
2	υ – υ – υ –	b
3	υ – υ – υ – υ	a
4	υ υ – υ υ – υ υ –	b
5	υ – υ υ – υ – υ	c
6	υ – υ υ – υ –	d
7	υ – υ – υ υ – υ	c
8	υ – υ – υ – υ	c
9	υ – υ – υ υ –	d
10	υ – υ υ – υ – υ	e
11	υ – υ υ – υ υ –	f
12	υ – υ υ – υ υ – υ	e
13	– υ υ – υ υ –	f
– : stressed syllable υ : unstressed syllable

The poem consists of three verses. The four verses of the two outer stanzas are in cross rhyme and end alternately with a raising or lowering. The inner stanza is extended to five verses by means of an additional couple rhyme. Due to the insertion as parenthesis, the eighth verse falls out of the poem, which could just as easily be read without it. According to Gisbert Hoffmann, the effect of the additional line is a ritardando, a delay in the end of the stanza. At the same time, it reinforces the previous verse 7, "there is only one thing: endure", and makes it the focal point of the poem. Benn repeatedly used the stylistic device of an additional verse in individual stanzas in his work; two of his poems consist entirely of five-line stanzas. Hoffmann explained the restless effect of the metre of "Nur zwei Dinge" with the varying number of syllables per verse as well as the irregular and unexpectedly distributed Versfüßen. The verses, all of which have three iambic forms, consist of different combinations of iambs and dactyls, with the exception of the purely iambic verses 2, 3 and 8, verse 4, which is made up of anapaests, and the final verse 13, which is the only one to begin with an iamb and thus accentuates the final formula. However, deviating scansion is also possible, according to which, for example, verse 4 begins emphatically, while verse 13 begins unstressed, thus repeating the pattern of verse 9.

While the first stanza of the poem still lacks any subject, from the second stanza onwards it is replaced by a "you" address. This can be understood as a monologue self-address, but Kaspar H. Spinner pointed out that the statements are spoken from a higher consciousness to the you. The "you" form elevates the verses beyond an identification of the author as speaker, giving the poem an autonomy in the instance of statement. While the "you" takes on the role of the lyrical I, the "I" as substantivized pronoun to object, in the last verse even with article and adjective. Gernot Böhme and Gisbert Hoffmann saw a splitting of the ego into an early and a late ego. The latter turns to its earlier consciousness, its biographical self, on the basis of acquired knowledge. According to Ulrike Draesner, this "I-you circle" invites the reader to "join in the rondo of speaking and being spoken to" by opening up a level of communication that is otherwise reserved for intimate conversations with oneself.

Theo Meyer emphasized the contrast between the open question and the definitive answers of the poem, which shows a tendency towards generalization and thesisness. The first two stanzas in particular consist exclusively of abstract statements without any pictorial element. A historical-actual reference is also completely hidden. However, Hans-Martin Gauger saw the abstraction through rhyme and rhythm as "rhetorically rushing". The sentence structure is hypotactic, the "linguistic pomp" creates a "high tone". According to Achim Geisenhanslüke, the structure of the poem adopts a traditional song form. Jürgen Schröder described a "parlando-like poetry", which formed a contrast to the "apodictic content". The soft tone of the poem is evoked by assonance, alliterations and anaphoras. For example, the first six verses begin with the letter D, which is taken up again at the end of the last two verses. Other recurring stylistic devices are the sequence of three nouns in each stanza, the colon used several times to intensify, and the enjambment of the concluding verses. According to Schröder, the result is a rhythmic ascent and descent of each individual verse, as well as a cycle from the beginning to the end of the poem, which rounds from the "I" of the second to the "I" of the last verse. Overall, the lyrical means lend "Nur zwei Dinge" a strong suggestiveness that entices the reader to identify with the radical content statements. For Helmuth Kiesel, the rhyme in particular had a superficial effect in the sense of "softening and making digestible" the disillusioning content, but it also sent a subliminal counter-message of beauty.

== Interpretation ==
According to Hermann Korte, despite the poem's direct formulations, it is not possible to clearly decipher its content. Although the theme can be narrowed down with the terms transience, futility and loneliness, the verses are made up of ambiguous ciphers that do not fully reveal their meaning. The recourse to principles of reduction and laconicism show hermetic tendencies. For Dieter Liewerscheidt, "Nur zwei Dinge" was characterized equally by semantic openness as well as syntactic vagueness. The ciphered short formulas and blank spaces of the poem invite reception aesthetics, the general allusions and the different interpretability of the terms allow a "sympathetic resonance of the reader" in the basic mood of Weltschmerz.

=== "Stepped through so many forms" ===
Edith A. Runge, one of the earliest interpreters of "Nur zwei Dinge", saw "the sum of existence" in the poem, with the very first line expressing resignation, insignificance and transience. She interpreted the forms "I", "we" and "you" as the self, the community and the other. For Gisbert Hoffmann, on the other hand, the three personal pronouns symbolized a life path through different stages of existence, similar to Helmuth Kiesel, who started from past attempts at a fulfilled life through individualism, collectivism and partnership. Jürgen Schröder explained the stadiums in historical terms: according to this, the "We" stands for the year 1933 and thus for Benn's own involvement in National Socialism.

Friederike Reents pursued a completely different approach. According to her interpretation, Benn progressed as a poet through literary forms, through poetry, prose and essay, in order to create the completed poem at the end, in which form and poetics are fulfilled. In this respect, the "emptiness" and the "drawn ego" do not represent nihilistic resignation for her in the end, but rather the poet's belief that he can create something imperishable out of nothing through art. Jürgen Egyptien established a connection between aesthetic forms in the first verse and social relationships in the second verse, while for Hans Bryner, both verses combine existential and linguistic forms and create a connection between life and writing: For the poet Benn, it was about shaping life through writing.

=== "the eternal question: what for?" ===
According to Hans Bryner, the question of what for in the context of the poem contains three things: the question of the meaning of life, the expectation of a negative answer and the suffering from this fact. Dieter Liewerscheidt saw the subject's suffering and the question of reasons connected in two ways by means of the preposition "through": On the one hand, suffering arising from life could be made more comforting through the search for meaning. On the other hand, the naïve question, later labeled as a "child's question", can be understood as the cause of all suffering. Eva Maria Lüders explained that the wrong question had distracted us for too long from the actual problem of how people could cope with their imposed life situation. In contrast, Gisbert Hoffmann saw the question of meaning not as a cause but as a consequence of suffering. It only arises from the disillusionment that goes hand in hand with passing through the stages of life.

According to Hans Bryner, the concept of the "eternal question" can also be explained in two ways: the question of meaning as the primal question of human existence, which has been asked again and again for ages despite the lack of an answer, and as "eternal questioning", as the tiresome repetition of an absurd "children's question". While Hans-Martin Gauger explicitly denied a theological-religious meaning and understood the adjective "eternal" purely colloquially, Hermann Korte ultimately saw the role and significance of the question of what for in the poem as unresolved and from it a "broad field of metaphysical reflections." Friedrich Kienecker called the question "overwhelmingly unanswerable" with a quote from Benn's poem Satzbau.

=== "whether sense, whether addiction, whether saga" ===
The triple alliteration on S, inserted as a parenthesis, allows a variety of interpretations. Eva M. Lüders recognized in the terms "the three areas in which our existence can become our own experience, a 'condition'". According to her, "Sinn" stands for the metaphysical urge to recognize life, but also for sensory perception, "Sucht" for the desire of instincts, but also for the word stem of the search, "Sage" for myth, literature or the imposed work of the poet. Gernot Böhme described meaning, addiction and legend as the three possible worldviewss, the explanatory patterns of human life, which experience their destiny from ideal goals, inner drives or predetermined destinies.

Fred Lönker explained meaning as an attempt to interpret the world and oneself, addiction as self-forgetfulness in intoxication. Gisbert Hoffmann interpreted the saga from Benn's poem Abschied as "your own saga -: that was you -?" the self-image or external image of one's own self. Hans Helmut Hiebel linked the trinity with the previous personal pronouns: the you of love with addiction, to which he later added roses, the we with the communal search for meaning, the I with the arts of legend. However, Jürgen Egyptien qualified the significance of the list, because regardless of whether a drive is identified as a fulfillment of meaning, obsession or prophecy, the following verse reveals it to be externally determined, an inherent human compulsion.

=== "your remote: You must" ===
According to Gisbert Hoffmann, Benn equated life with "having to live". No one could get out of their own skin, no one was able to act differently than they were destined to. A poet must write, in his work he is destined to be a stranger, without being able to fathom the origin of the urge. Hans Helmut Hiebel located the motives behind the actions in a distant, dark past. Theo Meyer spoke of "being determined by a supra-subjective, inscrutable and anonymous principle", which is characteristic of Benn's monologic poetry. Hans Bryner referred to other terms that Benn used in his poems to describe this foreign determining authority: Moira, Kismet, Heimarmene, Verhängnis, the Parzen. In the "You must" he recognized an answer to the previously posed question of "what for?" as well as a reduction of the Ten Commandments to the mere "You shall".

Gernot Böhme pointed out that we are talking about remote and not external determination, meaning that there is not necessarily another authority involved. Nor does the whole of life follow this determination, but merely the "you must", i.e. the constellation in which a person is placed and which they understand as a task. Jürgen Schröder related the verse to the biography of Gottfried Benn, who had initially welcomed National Socialism in his writings, for which he was later forced to justify himself. Through the "You must", fate was "misused as an alibi for moral and historical-political guilt", and defeat and error were elevated to a prerequisite for fame. Benn's own guilt is thus canceled out, the final "drawn I" becomes an expression of his self-justification.

=== "Whether roses, whether snow, whether seas" ===
The third sequence of nouns, which illustrates the transience of all things in the final verse, again allows for a variety of interpretations. Gernot Böhme saw the Vanitas motif as capturing nature in its entirety: the roses symbolized all living things, the snow the climatic influences and the seas the topography. Hans-Martin Gauger added the observation that there are three extra-human phenomena involved. Edith A. Runge, however, read them as ciphers for the beauty of nature, dying and the unfathomable being. For Maria Behre, time was the common denominator of the concepts: for her, roses, snow and seas illustrated the time forms of maturation, the moment and eternity. Eva M. Lüders, on the other hand, saw the world reduced to a fleeting becoming and passing away by three particularly changeable representatives, thus denying external reality as a whole.

Gisbert Hoffmann referred to the other uses of this metaphor in Benn's work. There, the rose often symbolizes beauty and melancholy, the snow purity, the sea vastness and tranquillity. Theo Meyer simply did not recognize a closed connection between the three nouns, but rather "indeterminate, multifaceted and general signs", which were less "concrete designations than cipher-like figures of meaning". Jürgen Schröder brought Oswald Spengler's Kulturkreis doctrine into play, which is naturalized in the three terms and short-circuited into a meaningless cycle. In the following verse, the only "active-sensual" verb in the poem, "erblühte", is immediately canceled out by the following "verblich", ending "Nur zwei Dinge" in a passivity and static of the nouns.

=== "the void and the drawn self" ===
In the last two verses, Benn draws the conclusion of the poem. According to Theo Meyer, the subject's relationship to the world is reduced to the juxtaposition of "emptiness" and "I", between which all references to meaning have dissolved. Only a formulaic self-assurance is still possible. Achim Geisenhanslüke spoke of a "mixture of resignation and self-assertion". Maria Behre concluded from the realization of emptiness, the absence of a metaphysical authority, the self-commitment to autonomy of the ego. According to Hans Helmut Hiebel, the ego is stigmatized by the "suffered" suffering and the "you must". In the double meaning of the word "marked", however, the ego also attempts to mark itself on art. Dieter Liewerscheidt posed the question of who, with a denial of the outside world, the ego could be marked by at all, in order to answer himself that it could only be the position of one's own fatalistic loneliness from which the ego suffers. He thus saw the poem as being suspected of "merely offering space to a narcissistic pose of pain".

While Hans-Martin Gauger understood the drawing exclusively in negative terms as an ego reduced by age and experience, for Jürgen Schröder, an awareness of vocation and being chosen was palpable in the formulation. Benn combines an elitist self-image and the reference to Christian role models to form a "Christ typology", which the poet cultivated in many notes from the period between 1934 and 1937. Another biblical reference was sought by Friedrich Hahn, who, in a Christian interpretation, contrasted the ego drawn by the void with the drawing of Zion: "I have marked you in my hands" (Jes 49,16). Hans Bryner, on the other hand, referred to the mark of Cain as the mythical beginning of humanity. The writer Ulrike Draesner recognized a literary reference in the drawn self: the "drawn self" as the draft of a poet.

== Reference to other works by Benn ==
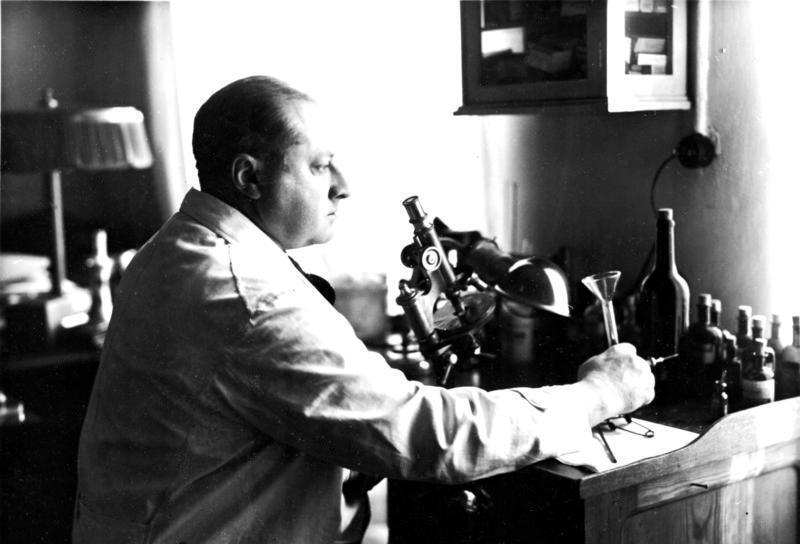
Gottfried Benn (1934)

According to Edith A. Runge, at the heart of "Nur zwei Dinge" is one of the fundamental motifs of Gottfried Benn's work: the dualism between life and spirit, the incompatibility of which ultimately led him to nihilism as the only appropriate attitude of mind. Thus, in 1949, Benn divided into world of expression: "That which lives is something other than that which thinks." Even then, he described the process of having to come to terms with this: "It has been hard-won, very hard-suffered." In this dualism, Benn spoke out in favor of the spirit as the only valid thing and increasingly denied life, which also led poetically to the principle of pure form, which extinguished its object. According to Runge, by turning to complete transcendence, Benn was ultimately left with only "the void, the recognizing ego, and suffering - all that remained for him was silence."

The poem "Reisen", written almost three years before "Nur zwei Dinge", also poses the question of meaning and reports on a late experience, already manifesting "the emptiness" that assails a traveler on the streets of various cities. What is most striking, however, is the correspondence of the last verses: "the self that is drawn" and "the self that surrounds itself." Gisbert Hoffmann juxtaposed the two poems. In each case, there is a confrontation between the ego and the void, which in Reisen is not separate from the ego, however, but emerges from it. Moreover, the ego in Reisen is not drawn passively, but actively separates itself from the environment. Benn had already proclaimed in 1949 in Der Radardenker that emptiness could not be countered merely with the passivity of "enduring" from "Nur zwei Dinge", but with activity and his own design: "There is no emptiness and there is no fullness, there is only the possibility of filling the emptiness here, immediately, at the window by means of sounding and transformation."

Jürgen Schröder referred to a poem from 1935 with the title Oh, the sublime when using the expression the drawn self:

„Only the marked will speak,
and the mixed will remain silent;
it is not a teaching for everyone,
but let no one be rejected because of it."

Even here, the marked man is elevated to the status of the chosen one, a tendency that also continues in the story Weinhaus Wolf from 1937. There, Benn justifies his disappointed rejection of National Socialist society and draws on religious imagery from the Revelation of John for the marked man. Schröder saw both the later "Du mußt" and the "Leere" as already laid out in the historical-philosophical reflections from Weinhaus Wolf: "All the great spirits of the white peoples have, it is quite obvious, felt only the one inner task of creatively covering their nihilism."

Jürgen Haupt pointed out another "structural and largely also substantial continuity" between "Nur zwei Dinge" and a letter from 1938 to the Bremen merchant and long-time pen pal Friedrich Wilhelm Oelze. At that time, an angry outburst by Benn, "that the whole thing is a big mess, humanity, its society, its biology and sociology, this whole stinking cinnabar around us", concluded with a similar formulation: "There are only two things: dirty humanity and lonely silent suffering - no border shifts!"

== Creation and publication ==
The poem "Nur zwei Dinge" was dated 7 January 1953 by Benn himself. Benn's notes contain preliminary works from the same month. An early version of the poem was divided into two parts. The third stanza of the final version followed the introduction:

„No crises, no crown,
neither interior nor form a
cultivated epigone without self-content."

A first draft of the first and second verse followed. The readings of the early versions read, for example: "wie sie blühten u. verblichen" instead of "was alles erblühte, verblich", "Der Mann hat immer gewusst" instead of "Dir wurde erst spät bewußt", and "Das eine dunkle: Du musst" instead of "dein fernbestimmtes: You must."

The poem was first printed in the Frankfurt edition of the Neue Zeitung on 26 March 1953. In May of the same year, it appeared as part of the poetry collection Destillationen. In a letter to Oelze, Benn commented on this volume: "I'm afraid they are boring, old-fashioned statement poems". Almost twenty years earlier, Benn had coined the phrase "rhymed world view" for it. In the final edition of the Collected Poems from 1956, the year of Benn's death, "Nur zwei Dinge" was originally intended to introduce the 1949-1955 section, but was then moved to the end of the volume before the poem Epilog 1949. Fred Lönker saw this as an indication of the special significance Benn attached to the poem. The latter had previously instructed him to end the volume with one of the poems "that seem best to me". For Jürgen Schröder, the final positioning of "Nur zwei Dinge" emphasized its "balance sheet and legacy character", Helmuth Kiesel described the poem as part of Benn's "poetic testament".

== Reception ==
According to Jürgen Schröder, "Nur zwei Dinge" became one of Gottfried Benn's most popular poems. He had "come up with such catchy and euphonious formulations that the author was soon completely committed to them." The first paperback edition of Benn's letters, for example, was entitled Das gezeichnete Ich. The poem enables the reader to break down the content into a few universal statements: everything is transient and cannot be fathomed, every person is ultimately alone. Especially in the post-war period, the existential self-justification of the poem struck a chord with the West German population. The mixture of grief and melancholy brought about a catharsis without having to face up to concrete guilt and, according to Schröder, made it possible "to come to terms with the denied past in a poetic way". By the 1960s, such a reading was no longer relevant and Benn had become unfashionable. It was only in the 1980s that a new, less time-related reading of the poem was possible again.

In a survey conducted by Westdeutscher Rundfunk in May 2000 on Germans' favorite poems, "Nur zwei Dinge" came 39th. Marcel Reich-Ranicki included it in his Kanon der deutschen Literatur as well as in his personal selection of 100 poems of the 20th century. In a contemporary review of Benn's collection of poems Destillationen, Karl Krolow, who was very critical of other poems in this edition, classified "Nur zwei Dinge" among "some magnificent pieces" and described: "Here, fatality stands next to magic." Hans Helmut Hiebel described "Nur zwei Dinge" as Benn's "life balance", in which he had "expressed the reality of his experience in a compact, concise and coherent way". The poem is "- despite the abstractions - eloquent and coated with the 'glaze' of beauty." In retrospect, Peter Rühmkorf felt "drawn to Gottfried Benn in a way that was almost like suffering" through poems such as "Nur zwei Dinge" in his "final tailspin". For Wolfgang Emmerich, "Nur zwei Dinge" was a "perfect, popular text in its own way".

However, the lyrical tone and formal perfection of the poem were also criticized. Thus Wolfgang Braungart spoke of a "famous and gruesome" poem. The last verse is "at the best poetry album level ('Roses, tulips, carnations / All flowers wither'). The absurd combination (roses, snow, seas) reads like an unintentional parody." For Mathias Schreiber, "Nur zwei Dinge" was "a nihilistic hit". He criticized: "The smooth, closed-form singsong of the end rhymes is without irony: it is meant to carry the message in all seriousness, to reinforce it with a pseudo-prophetic organ tone". Unintentionally, the self-assured language becomes a "mockery of the 'drawn self'". In the poem, there is "depth without surface, i.e. pseudo-radicality: a prime example of kitsch." Dieter Liewerscheidt also criticized the "shiny aesthetic flip side of a blanket reference to content that has become indifferent". The "cult of form that has already left the world behind" is celebrating "a hollow triumph".

In addition to reprints of the complete poem in Lyrikanthologien, the last two verses of "Nur zwei Dinge" in particular were frequently quoted. Friedrich Kienecker spoke of the "drawn ego" as a metaphor "for modern man's sense of self and self-image", expressing "a basic human experience", which he found in a modified form in many contemporary poems. For Eva M. Lüders, too, the "'drawn ego' was the bearer and hero of modern poetry". It stands for "the end of that personal culture of life in which the 'lyrical ego' was at home." However, in a meeting with Hans Mayer, Paul Celan objected to the closing formula of "Nur zwei Dinge". According to Mayer, Celan denied himself such a "sentimental aura", because in his poetics the poem was at the center, whereas with Benn it was the poet who was drawn and condemned to expression. With the poem After Gottfried Benn, the Spanish poet Leopoldo María Panero wrote a "posthumous imitation of Gottfried Benn", which at the same time distances itself from the beautiful words of his role model. His drawn self is close to madness and waits for death in a stinking cell. Another response to "Nur zwei Dinge" was published in 1997 by Marcel Beyer with his poem Nur zwei Koffer, which concludes with the lines: "There remain only / the two suitcases, Rasurfehler hier, und du: ich / stelle die Kinderfrage ebenso lautlos. What for."

"Nur zwei Dinge" was published several times on recordings together with other poems by Benn, for example in readings by Gottfried Benn himself, Will Quadflieg and Dieter Mann. By 1995, a total of six musical adaptations of the poem had been created, including by Heinz Friedrich Hartig as part of the oratorio Wohin (1963/64), Xaver Paul Thoma for alto voice and viola (1977) and Günter Bialas for medium voice and tenor saxophone (1987/88). The Hamburg pop musician Das Gezeichnete Ich borrowed his pseudonym from Benn's poem.

== Literature ==
=== Publications ===
- First publication: Die Neue Zeitung. Frankfurt edition. No. 72 of 26 March 1953, p. 4.
- Gottfried Benn: Destillationen. Neue Gedichte.Limes, Wiesbaden 1953, p. 19.
- Gottfried Benn: Gesammelte Gedichte. Limes, Wiesbaden 1956, p. 358.

=== Secondary literature ===
- Gernot Böhme: Die Frage Wozu? – eine Kinderfrage? In: Gernot Böhme, Gisbert Hoffmann: Benn und wir. Existentielle Interpretationen zu Gedichten von Gottfried Benn. Xenomoi, Berlin 2008, ISBN 978-3-936532-81-4, p. 33–52.
- Hans Bryner: Das Rosenmotiv in Gottfried Benns Lyrik. Skizzen zu Bild und Bau. Peter Lang, Bern 1985, ISBN 3-261-04087-4, S. 119–132.
- Hans Helmut Hiebel: Das Spektrum der modernen Poesie. Interpretationen deutschsprachiger Lyrik 1900–2000 im internationalen Kontext der Moderne. Teil I (1900–1945). Königshausen & Neumann, Würzburg 2005, ISBN 3-8260-3200-4, p. 238–242.
- Gisbert Hoffmann: Vergänglichkeit und Dauer. In: Gernot Böhme, Gisbert Hoffmann: Benn und wir. Existentielle Interpretationen zu Gedichten von Gottfried Benn. Xenomoi, Berlin 2008, ISBN 978-3-936532-81-4, p. 53–89.
- Fred Lönker: Gottfried Benn. 10 Gedichte. Erläuterungen und Dokumente. Reclam, Stuttgart 2010, ISBN 978-3-15-016069-5, p. 134–145.
- Eva M. Lüders: Das lyrische Ich und das gezeichnete Ich. Zur späten Lyrik Gottfried Benns. In: Wirkendes Wort 15/1965, p. 361–385.
- Theo Meyer: Kunstproblematik und Wortkombinatorik bei Gottfried Benn. Böhlau, Köln 1971, ISBN 3-412-93071-7, p. 341–344.
- Edith A. Runge: Gottfried Benns „Nur zwei Dinge". In: Wolfgang Peitz (Hrsg.): Denken in Widersprüchen. Korrelarien zur Gottfried Benn-Forschung. Becksmann, Freiburg im Breisgau 1972, pp. 343–364. first printed in: Monatshefte für deutschen Unterricht, deutsche Sprache und Literatur. Vol. XLIX, 1957, p. 161–178.
- Jürgen Schröder: Destillierte Geschichte. Zu Gottfried Benns Gedicht Nur zwei Dinge. In: Walter Hinck (Hrsg.): Gedichte und Interpretationen. Gegenwart I. Reclam, Stuttgart 1982, ISBN 3-15-007895-4, p. 20–28.
