= Hippie Masala =

- Poster of the film
- Directed by: Ulrich Grossenbacher; Damaris Lüthi
- Written by: Damaris Lüthi
- Cinematography: Ulrich Grossenbacher
- Edited by: Maya Schmid
- Music by: Matthias Gmünder; Sahlil Shankar
- Production companies: Fair&Ugly Filmproduktion GmbH
- Release date: January 2006
- Running time: 93 minutes
- Country: Switzerland
- Languages: English, Swiss German

Hippie Masala: Für immer in Indien (English: Hippie Masala: Forever in India) is a 2006 Swiss documentary film directed by Ulrich Grossenbacher and Damaris Lüthi. It follows Western expatriates who remain in India after the hippie movement of the late 1960s. The film was screened at festivals including Munich, Locarno, Woodstock, and Miami.

== Synopsis ==
The film follows hippies who left the West for Asia in the late 1960s and are shown living in India decades later. Among them are Cesare, an Italian who lives as a yogi in a remote cave, and Hanspeter from the Emmental, who has made a life for himself as a mountain farmer in northern India.

== Production ==
Ulrich Grossenbacher had himself spent time in India in the late 1970s. The idea came during a later trip when he met a French couple living in India. Lüthi had studied ethnology and had carried out research in South India. For the research and shoot, the filmmakers spent more than six months in India and returned with around 120 hours of footage.

== Reception ==
=== Awards and nominations ===
In 2007, Hippie Masala was nominated for the Swiss Film Prize for Best Documentary Film.

=== Critical response ===
Filmdienst wrote that the film looks at why the expatriates stayed in India and how they live there, but does not place their lives in a wider cultural context. Filmbulletin described the film as a homage to the hippie generation. It also wrote that the film raises questions about cultural barriers and presents both the expatriates and Indian society with humour.

== Festival screenings ==
The film's festival screenings included the Munich International Documentary Film Festival, the DOCNZ International Documentary Film Festival, and the Locarno Film Festival in 2006. It was also screened at the Woodstock Film Festival in 2007, and at the Miami International Film Festival and the International Film Festival of India in 2008.
