= Morgue and Other Poems =

Poetry collection by Gottfried Benn

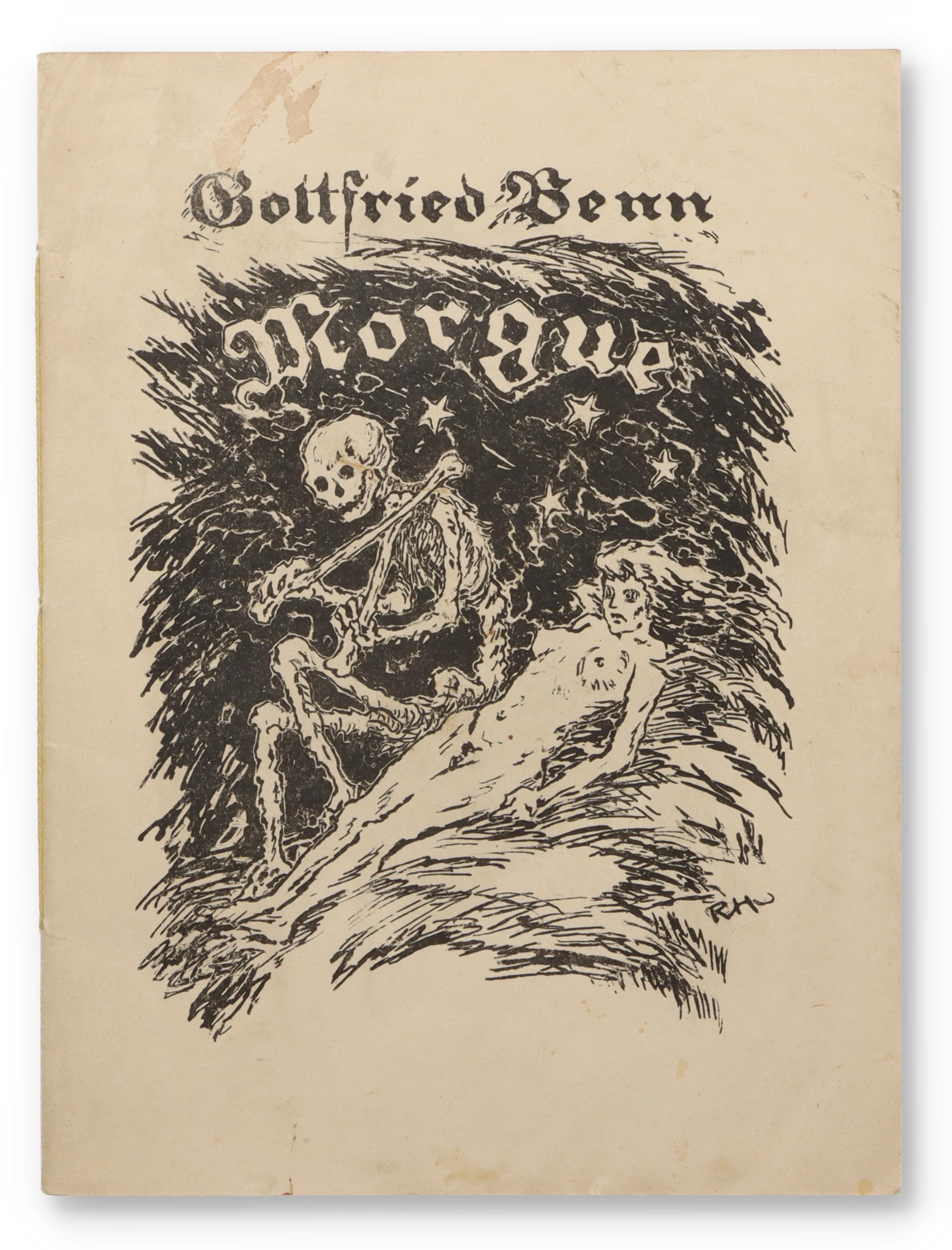
Cover of a 1923 edition from Verlag der Bücherwinkel

Morgue and Other Poems (German: Morgue und andere Gedichte) is a 1912 poetry collection by the German writer Gottfried Benn. It is a booklet with nine expressionist poems, the first six of which are the Morgue cycle, which describes images and incidents from a morgue.

Published in 500 copies in March 1912, in the series lyrisches Flugblatt from Berlin's A. R. Meyer Verlag, Morgue and Other Poems was the debut book of Benn, a 25-year-old medicine student. It was widely discussed by literary critics upon publication and has continued to inspire a large amount of analysis. Its cold, eerie atmosphere and descriptions of sickness and decay have led to comparisons to Les Fleurs du mal by Charles Baudelaire. Richard M. Meyer connected its imagery to Pieter Bruegel's depictions of Hell. For the 100th anniversary in 2012, Klett-Cotta Verlag published an edition with original illustrations by Georg Baselitz.
