= Statische Gedichte =

1948 poetry collection by Gottfried Benn

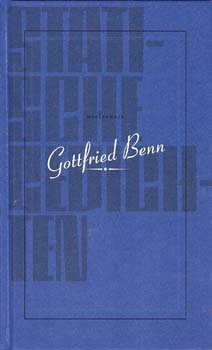
- Author: Gottfried Benn
- Language: German
- Publisher: Arche Verlag
- Publication date: 1948
- Publication place: Switzerland
- Pages: 80

Statische Gedichte (lit. 'Static Poems') is a 1948 poetry collection by the German writer Gottfried Benn. It was well received by German critics and treated as the culmination of Benn's poetry. It had an influence on Martin Heidegger's late philosophy.

== Contents ==
Previously published	Title
1941–1944	Ach, das ferne Land
1945–1946	Quartär
1944	Chopin
1945–1946	Orpheus' Tod
1939	Verse
1941	Gedichte
	Bilder
1920–1940	Welle der Nacht
1930–1933	Am Saum des nordischen Meer's
1935	Tag, der den Sommer endet
1937	Die Gefährten
1944	Dann
1944	V. Jahrhundert
1935	Astern
1944	September
1943	Alle die Gräber
1943	Wenn etwas leicht
1941	Ein Wort
1943	Gärten und Nächte
1933	Sils-Maria
1943	Ein später Blick
1943	Nachzeichnung
1927	In Memoriam Höhe 317
1943	Verlorenes Ich
1941	Henri Matisse: „Asphodèles“
1938	Ist das nicht schwerer
1943	St. Petersburg – Mitte des Jahrhunderts
1943	Mittelmeerisch
1936	Einsamer nie
1936	Wer allein ist
1934	Spät im Jahre
	Suchst Du
	Der Traum
	Anemone
1936	Turin
1936	Leben – niederer Wahn
1935	Ach, das Erhabene
	Sommers
1941	Abschied
	Die Form
	Statische Gedichte

== Reception ==
The book was very well received by German critics, who in many cases treated it as the pinnacle of Benn's poetry. The dominant view of German critics in the 1950s was that Benn had created his own path within modernist poetry, starting in expressionism and culminating with Statische Gedichte. An exception was Gottfried Willems, who argued that Statische Gedichte was a dead end, whereas Benn's poetry after it influenced the next generation of German poets, the Neue Lyrik of the 1960s.

Statische Gedichte influenced Martin Heidegger during his late period, when he became more interested in the poetic. According to Martin Travers, Heidegger was especially influenced by Statische Gedichte in his 1950 essay collection Off the Beaten Track and 1957 essay "Das Wesen der Sprache".
