= Four for Venice =

1998 German comedy film

- Theatrical release poster
- Directed by: Vivian Naefe
- Written by: Barbara Jago; Vivian Naefe
- Produced by: Harald Kügler
- Starring: Aglaia Szyszkowitz; Gedeon Burkhard
- Production company: Olga-Film
- Distributed by: Buena Vista International
- Release date: 5 March 1998
- Running time: 93 minutes
- Country: Germany
- Language: German

Four for Venice (German: 2 Männer, 2 Frauen - 4 Probleme!?) is a 1998 comedy film directed by Vivian Naefe.

== Plot ==
The film involves two married couples: Nick and Charlotte and Luis and Eva.

Nick and Charlotte are more than busy earning money, there is no time for love or sex - only Tuesdays. Soon, Charlotte finds a lover, Luis, an unsuccessful artist. Luis and Eva also have no time for sex: he must find his inspiration for art and Eva has agreed to give up her own occupation as an artist to support themselves and their 3 and 6 year old kids by working in a restaurant.

The secret affair between Luis and Charlotte lasts quite a while, they decide to spend a romantic week in Venice, Italy, but accidentally Eva finds out about the affair and their destination.

Eva kidnaps Nick on her trip to Venice in order to restore her marriage as well as his. During their stay in Venice, Luis becomes ill and spends the entire week in the bathroom. On their way from Munich, Germany (where the first half of the story takes place) to Venice, Eva's car breaks down somewhere in the Alps, so she, Nick, and her two children are forced to walk and hitchhike the rest of the way.

Nick is allergic to children and continually sneezes but the children grow on him, since Eva's no-nonsense attitude forces him to spend a lot of time with them. They arrive in Venice without money, passports, credit cards, their clothes torn and burnt, on a Friday evening, which means that they have to spend the weekend without any support from the German consulate. When they finally meet their respective spouses, things are not quite the same for any of them.

== Cast ==
- Aglaia Szyszkowitz as Eva
- Heino Ferch as Nick
- Gedeon Burkhard as Luis
- Hilde Van Mieghem as Charlotte

== See also ==
- List of German language films
