= Rufus Beck =

German theater, film, and voice actor

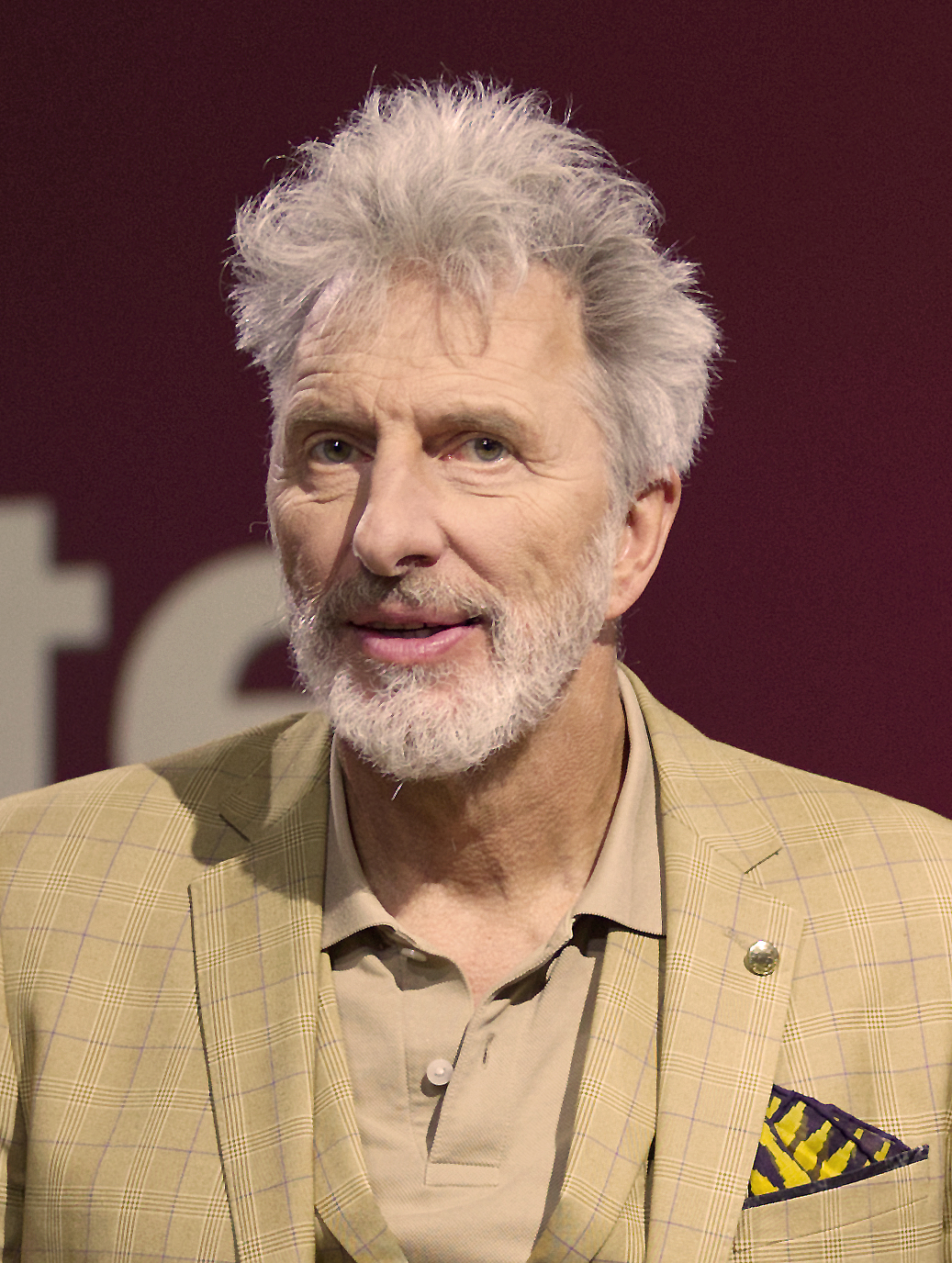
Beck in 2023

Rufus Beck (born 23 July 1957) is a German theater, film, and voice actor.

Besides his work on stage, on film, and on television, Beck is also a well known reader of audiobooks, having worked as the narrator of the German translations of the Harry Potter series. He is also well known for his role in the comedy Der bewegte Mann, and as the narrator of Wächter der Wüste - Auch kleine Helden kommen ganz groß raus.

== Life ==
Beck was born in Heidelberg. After his Abitur in 1976 (roughly equivalent to an associate degree, or A-Levels in England) and completing his Zivildienst (alternative to required military service), he studied Islamic Studies, Ethnology, and Philosophy at the University of Heidelberg. During his studies he also performed on stage in Heidelberg. He also appeared onstage at the Sauerländischen State Theater, the State Theater Tübingen, Schauspiel Frankfurt, Schauspiel Köln, and the Bayerisches Staatsschauspiel.

In 1989, Beck was named Young Actor of the Year by Theater heute. He also won that year the Young Actor Prize of the Association of the Friends of Bavarian Theater.

Beck began touring in the early 1990s and was very successful. Then in 1994, he acted in the film Der bewegte Mann, a role for which he won a Bambi.

In 1998 he was nominated for a German Film Prize for his role in Jimmy the Kid.

Since 1998 his career highlights include a return to the stage as a guest in the famed Berliner Ensemble and the role of Mephisto in Goethe's Faust at the Bad Hersfelder Festival. He won the Hersfeld-Preis (Großer Hersfeld-Preis) in 2006.

He is the father of actor Jonathan Beck.

== Dubbing roles ==
- A Bug's Life - Hopper
- Shrek - Lord Farquaad
- Cats & Dogs - Mr. Tinkles

== Audiobooks (excerpt) ==
- His Dark Materials: Der Goldene Kompass - Die Trilogie, publisher: Silberfisch, ISBN 978-3867428484 (2011)
- Harry Potter (complete edition) by J. K. Rowling, publisher: Der Hörverlag, ISBN 9783844511369 (2013)
- His Dark Materials: Über den wilden Fluss by Philip Pullman (La Belle Sauvage), publisher: Silberfisch, ISBN 978-3867423823 (2017)
- His Dark Materials 4: Ans andere Ende der Welt (The Secret Commonwealth) by Philip Pullman, publisher: Silberfisch, ISBN 978-3867423830 (2020)
- Tale of Magic – Eine geheime Akademie by Chris Colfer (Tale of Magic 1), publisher: Argon Verlag, Berlin, ISBN 978-3839842454 (2021)
- TALE OF MAGIC: DIE LEGENDE DER MAGIE: Eine geheime Akademie & Eine dunkle Verschwörung by Chris Colfer, publisher: Argon Verlag, Berlin 2022, ISBN 978-3-7324-0477-3 (Audiobook-Download)
- His Dark Materials 5: Das Feld der Rosen (The Rose Field: The Book of Dust Volume Three) by Philip Pullman, publisher: Silberfisch/Hörbuch Hamburg, 2026
