= The Earthquake in Chile =

1807 short story by Heinrich von Kleist

The Earthquake in Chile (German: Das Erdbeben in Chili) is a short story written by Heinrich von Kleist (1777–1811) and published in 1807. The story's central characters are two lovers caught up in the chaos of the 1647 Santiago earthquake in Chile.

== Synopsis ==
The story begins with the lead character, Jeronimo Rugera, preparing to hang himself in prison in Santiago in 1647. Rugera had been a tutor at the house of Don Asteron, but Don Asteron dismissed him upon Asteron's discovery of an illicit relationship between his daughter and Jeronimo. Jeronimo and Josephe continued their relationship and were soon discovered by Josephe's brother. Don Asteron sends Josephe to a convent, where she and Jeronimo continue their relationship, until one day Josephe gave birth on the steps of the cathedral.

The city folk are excited by this story. Jeronimo was sent to prison and Josephe was scheduled to be executed. As the procession marched towards the execution site, Jeronimo prepares to hang himself. At this moment, a strong earthquake destroys much of the city, freeing Jeronimo from prison. Despite his fears that Josephe had already died, he begins to search for her, and is later reunited with her and their son, Philip.

On her way to her execution as the earthquake strikes, Josephe rescues her son from the convent, where she had entrusted him to an abbess. The abbess and most of the nuns are dead. Josephe had spent much of the day searching for Jeronimo and fearing him dead. They plan to travel to Concepción, Chile, where Josephe has a friend, and from there to Spain.

The following morning, the couple is approached by Don Fernando who asks Josephe to breast feed his son, Juan, since his wife, Donna Elvira, has been injured in the earthquake. She complies, and Don Fernando invites the reunited family to join his own. They are greeted as friends, and exchange stories and rumours of the happenings in Santiago. Jeronimo and Josephe decide to go to Concepción and write to the Viceroy of Santiago to ask permission to stay in Chile.

That afternoon, a service is to be held at the lone surviving church in Santiago and the party, aside from Donna Elvira, her father Don Pedro and Donna Isabel, decides to attend. Donna Elvira appears to fear for Josephe's and Jeronimo's safety but Don Fernando feels that Donna Elvira's fears are misplaced. They attend the service.

The sermon compares the earthquake to God's destruction of Sodom and Gomorrah and speaks specifically of Josephe and Jeronimo's sin. Donna Constanza, Don Fernando's sister in law, recognizes the danger, but before the party can make their escape, someone calls out, identifying Josephe as the adulteress and accusing Don Fernando of being Jeronimo.

Josephe, who is holding Don Fernando's son Juan is grabbed by the crowd. The crowd assumes Juan is Josephe's baby. Don Fernando identifies himself and attempts to rescue Josephe. A naval officer, Don Alonzo, identifies Don Fernando but hesitates when a cobbler asks about Josephe. Josephe gives Juan and Phillip, who was being held by Jeronimo, to Don Fernando and tells him to leave and save the children, but he refuses and borrows Don Alonzo's sword. The crowd allows them to leave, and just as they think it's safe to enter the courtyard, a man claims that he is Jeronimo's father and clubs Jeronimo over the head. Donna Constanza, who had been walking with Jeronimo, runs to Don Alonzo, but is mistaken for Josephe and is also clubbed to death. Seeing this, Josephe gives herself up to the crowd and is clubbed by the cobbler, Master Pedrillo. Don Fernando defends the children with his sword but eventually his son, Juan, is torn from his grasp and bashed against a pillar.

The crowd disperses and Don Fernando is left with Philip, whom he adopts as his own child with Donna Elvira. At the conclusion, Don Fernando compares Juan and Philip and considers how he had acquired them, and remarks; "It almost seemed to him that he should be glad."

== Characters ==
- Jeronimo Rugera – A Spaniard, the lover of Josephe
- Josephe Asteron – Daughter of the richest nobleman in the city, the lover of Jeronimo
- Philipp – The son of Jeronimo and Josephe
- Don Fernando Ormez – An acquaintance of Josephe, husband of Donna Elvira
- Donna Elvira – Don Fernando's wife
- Juan – Donna Elvira and Don Fernando's son
- Don Pedro – Donna Elvira's father
- Donna Isabel – A relation of Don Fernando
- Donna Constanza – Sister of Donna Elvira.
- Master Pedrillo – A cobbler
- Don Alonzo – An acquaintance of Don Fernando and Josephe, a naval officer
- Don Henrico Asteron – Father of Josephe

== Film ==
Helma Sanders-Brahms wrote and directed Earthquake in Chile (1975), a telefilm of this story shot in Spain and West Germany.
