= The Future of Emily =

- Theatrical release poster
- Directed by: Helma Sanders-Brahms
- Written by: Helma Sanders-Brahms; Suzanne Schiffman; Sylvie Ponsard
- Produced by: Helma Sanders-Brahms; Margaret Ménégoz; Ursula Ludwig; Barbet Schroeder; Christoph Holch
- Cinematography: Sacha Vierny
- Edited by: Ursula West; Bettina Böhler; Galip İyitanır
- Music by: Jürgen Knieper
- Production companies: Helma Sanders Filmproduktion GmbH; Les Films du Losange; Zweites Deutsches Fernsehen; Literarisches Colloquium Berlin e.V.
- Distributed by: Basis-Film-Verleih GmbH
- Release date: 3 December 1984 (BFI London Film Festival)
- Running time: 108 minutes
- Country: West Germany
- Language: German

The Future of Emily (German: Flügel und Fesseln) is a 1984 West German drama film directed by Helma Sanders-Brahms. Barbara Kosta, author of Recasting Autobiography: Women's Counterfictions in Contemporary German Literature and Film, states that The Future of Emily, along with Laputa, "pursue[s] traditional narrative patterns" compared to Germany, Pale Mother, and "lapse[s] further into awkward melodrama." Christian Schröder, author of Hildegard Knef: Mir sollten sämtliche Wunder begegnen, wrote that the film appears "very French" and "very German" at the same time and compared it to the films of Éric Rohmer.

== Plot ==
Isabelle Kahn is a successful film actress whose young daughter, Emily, is frequently cared for by her parents in Normandy while she's away working. After a production ends in Berlin, she returns to visit her daughter. However, the rejoicing is short-lived. Her smitten costar follows, and his presence sets off an intense clash between the self-centered thespian and her mother.

== Development ==
Filming began in Barfleur and Réville in Manche, Normandy in January 1984.

== Cast ==
- Brigitte Fossey as Isabelle Kahn (Voice: Helma Sanders-Brahms)
- Camille Raymond as Emily Kahn (Voice: Caroline Ruprecht)
- Hermann Treusch as Friedrich (Voice: Mathieu Carrière)
- Hildegard Knef as Paula Kahn
- Ivan Desny as Charles Kahn

== Release ==
The film was released on DVD by Facets Multi-Media in 2008.

== Reception ==
Film critic Glenn Erickson described the film as "good" and praised Facets' DVD production, London's Time Out wrote that the "actresses sink their teeth into" the film "with consummate relish" and it has been noted that the film is considered an "excellent drama [which is] Sanders-Brahms' most refined and elegant." It has been argued that the film's "point is that, in modern society, there are women who also are living well without men, but they are brainwashed into thinking that they would be better off with male partners."

== Bibliography ==
- Schröder, Christian. Hildegard Knef: Mir sollten sämtliche Wunder begegnen. Aufbau-Verlag, 2004. ISBN 3351025750, 9783351025755. (in German)
