= Der bewegte Mann =

1994 German comedy film

- German film poster
- Directed by: Sönke Wortmann
- Written by: Sönke Wortmann; Ralf König (comic)
- Produced by: Bernd Eichinger
- Starring: Til Schweiger; Katja Riemann; Joachim Król
- Cinematography: Gernot Roll
- Edited by: Ueli Christen
- Music by: Torsten Breuer
- Distributed by: Neue Constantin Film
- Release date: 6 October 1994
- Running time: 93 minutes
- Country: Germany
- Language: German
- Box office: 60 million DM

Der bewegte Mann (international title: The Most Desired Man, U.S. title: Maybe ... Maybe Not) is a 1994 German comedy film directed by Sönke Wortmann and starring Til Schweiger, Rufus Beck, Joachim Król and Katja Riemann.

The film developed from the comics "Der bewegte Mann" and "Pretty Baby" by Ralf König.

== Plot ==
After she caught him cheating on her on a public toilet, Axel (played by Til Schweiger) has just been dumped by his girlfriend Doro (Katja Riemann), and needs to find a new place to live. He meets Walter a.k.a. Waltraud (Rufus Beck), a transvestite who is participating in a heterosexual men's group to provide a gay man's perspective. Walter talks Axel into joining him and some friends at a gay party afterwards, and tries to convince Axel to move in with him. At the party, Axel decides instead to move in with Walter's best friend, Norbert (Joachim Król), whose boyfriend has just left him. Later, at Axel and Doro's apartment, Norbert tries to seduce Axel while they browse old photos. Just when Norbert has shed all his clothes, Doro shows up at the door, and Axel hastily hides Norbert. Doro explains to Axel that she's expecting his child and wants to give their relationship a second chance. She is not amused to discover a naked man in the wardrobe, but Axel manages to convince her that nothing has happened. Excited about fatherhood and eager to return to Doro, Axel forgets about his new friendship with Norbert.

But soon Axel discovers a downside to the pregnancy: he finds that he is extremely adverse to having sex with a pregnant woman, due to an irrational fear of hurting the child. Despite his engagement to her, he decides to stray when he encounters Elke, a former girlfriend. They are trying to find a place to have sex when Axel bumps into Norbert again. At first Norbert is angry with him for having left without a word, but Axel claims it's only because Doro was upset. Axel convinces Norbert to lend his apartment for the tryst with Elke. A few days later at Norbert's apartment, Elke gives Axel a mind-altering drug, and leaves him sitting naked on a table. Meanwhile, Doro has learned that Axel went to Norbert's apartment, and she thinks that Axel is going to have sex with Norbert. She confronts Norbert at his apartment and upon entering, she sees Axel naked and unable to speak and starts to go into labor. In the bathroom Norbert finds Elke and Norbert's not-so-gay boyfriend playing in the tub. As Norbert drives her to the hospital, he attempts to explain everything on the way. Doro forgives Norbert and they become friends, but her relationship with Axel is in question.

== Cast ==
- Til Schweiger as Axel Feldheim
- Katja Riemann as Doro Feldheim
- Joachim Król as Norbert Brommer
- Rufus Beck as Walter alias Waltraut
- Armin Rohde as Metzger
- Martina Gedeck as Jutta
- Kai Wiesinger as Gunnar
- Monty Arnold as Monty
- Martin Armknecht as Lutz
- Mike Reichenbach as Rambo-Fan

== Reception ==
The film opened on 188 screens on 6 October 1994 and was number one at the German box office. It sold 1 million tickets in its first three weeks generating a gross of $10.3 million. It remained in the top 10 for 24 weeks and went on to become one of the highest-grossing German films with admissions of over 6 million and a gross of over 60 million Deutsche Mark ($43 million). It was the most popular German film of 1994 with almost 4 million admissions and also in 1995 with over 2 million admissions. It was also a success in Switzerland and Finland.

The film was awarded the Golden Shell for best film at the German Film Awards and also won awards for best director (Wortmann) and best actor (Krol).

== See also ==
- List of German language films
- List of lesbian, gay, bisexual or transgender-related films
