= Aglaia Szyszkowitz =

Austrian actress (born 1968)

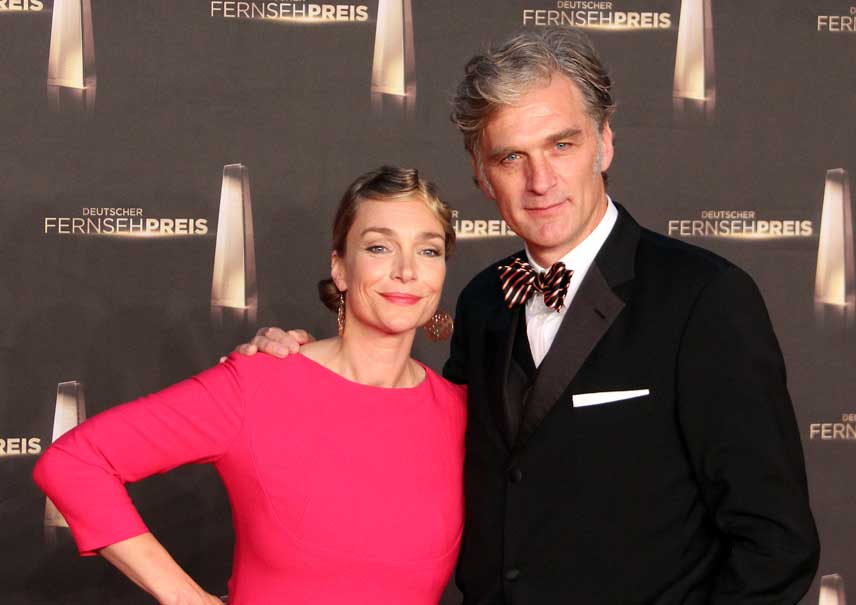
- Aglaia Szyszkowitz and Walter Sittler at the Deutscher Fernsehpreis in 2012
- Born: 11 January 1968 (age 58); Graz, Austria
- Occupation: Actor
- Years active: 1995–present
- Spouse: Marcus Müller (m. 1992)
- Children: 2

Aglaia Szyszkowitz (born 11 January 1968) is an Austrian actress. She has appeared in more than seventy films since 1995.

== Filmography ==
=== Film ===
| Year | Title | Role | Notes |
|---|---|---|---|
| 1998 | Four for Venice | Eva | |
| 1998 | Alles wird gut | Katja | |
| 2001 | Das Sams | Frau März | |
| 2002 | Verrückt nach Paris | Chris | |
| 2003 | Tigermännchen sucht Tigerweibchen | Marlene Singer | |
| 2005 | Neun | Rebecca Schöning | |
| 2006 | Klimt | Mizzi | |
| 2011 | Almanya: Welcome to Germany | Ärztin | |
| 2012 | Sams im Glück | Frau Taschenbier | |
| 2018 | Die Wunderübung | Joana Dorek | |

TV
| Year | Title | Role | Notes |
|---|---|---|---|
| 2005 | Der Todestunnel | Sabine Fink | TV movie |
| 2006 | My Husband's Getting Married Today | Caroline Petersen | TV movie |
| 2011 | Shadows from the Past | Vera Schlink | TV movie |
| 2012 | Rommel | Lucie-Maria Rommel | TV movie |
| 2018 | Origin | Margo Von Platen | Episode: "Fire and Ice" |
