= My Heart Is Mine Alone =

1997 German film

- DVD cover
- Directed by: Helma Sanders-Brahms
- Written by: Helma Sanders-Brahms
- Produced by: Helma Sanders-Brahms; Christhart Burgmann; Ute Casper
- Cinematography: Roland Dressel
- Edited by: Nadine Schulze; Monika Schindler; Helma Sanders-Brahms
- Music by: Angelika Flacke; Eckard Koltermann; Peter Kowald
- Production companies: Helma Sanders-Brahms Filmproduktion GmbH; Arte G.E.I.E. Westdeutscher Rundfunk
- Distributed by: Freunde der Deutschen Kinemathek e.V.
- Release date: 17 September 1997
- Running time: 105 minutes
- Country: Germany
- Language: German

My Heart Is Mine Alone (German: Mein Herz – niemandem!) is a 1997 German experimental drama film directed by Helma Sanders-Brahms. A 1997 issue of Jewish Currents wrote that the film is "a kind of German movie that usually requires more than one screening to decipher and is made for avant-garde devotees."

== Plot ==
The story of the real-life love affair between Jewish poet Else Lasker-Schüler and Nazi poet Gottfried Benn is told largely through their poetry throughout the film. Lasker-Schüler is forced to leave the country because of the very ideology Benn espouses, and while she drifts from country to country en route to Jerusalem, he eventually realizes his mistake when the Nazis condemn his artistic school.

== Cast ==
- Lena Stolze as Else Lasker-Schüler
- Thomas Ruffer as Berthold Lasker
- René Schubert as Noble
- Katja Ruttloff as Else Lasker-Schüler's Sister
- Anna Sanders as Edith Benn
- Cornelius Obonya as Gottfried Benn
- Tomek Schulz as Young Gottfried Benn
- Christian Schlemmer as Wassily Kandinsky
- Janina Berge as Young Else Lasker-Schüler
- Stefan Ostertag as Franz Marc
- Nicolai Albrecht as Marc Chagall
- Inken Schmitz as Lasker Family Member
- Wolfgang Tebbe as Lasker Family Member
- Dagmar Bertram as Lasker Family Member
- Matthias Wessolek as Fat Cat
- Klaus Bunk as Herwarth Walden
- Sabine Panzer as Nell Walden
- Oliver Grice as Gustav Benn
- Lothar von Versen as Peter Hille
- Julia Kiessling as Else Lasker-Schüler's Sister
- Leonard Schnitman as Paul Schüler
- Nikolai Sirenko as Aaron Schüler
- Valentina Sirenko as Jeannette Schüler
- Bruno Dunst as Professor

== Release ==
The film was released on DVD by Facets Multi-Media in 2008.

== Reception ==
Critical opinion has been largely positive. The film was screened out of competition at the 1997 Berlin International Film Festival and was nominated for the Maverick Spirit Award at the Cinequest Film Festival in 1998 as well as for the Emden Film Award at the International Filmfest Emden in 1997. Variety, although opining that the film was "flat," nevertheless praised the leading actress' "charm and energy," as did Metro Silicon Valley critic Richard von Busack, who wrote that "[d]ark, pocket-size and intense, Stolze has the magnetism to prove why men thought of Lasker-Schüler as an Expressionist vampire," and critic Ed Soohoo, who wrote that it is "wonderful to see" Lena Stolze "once again on screen as she brings life to Else." Critic Peter Nellhaus has praised the film's "expressionist collage of conventional biographical re-enactment, stylized staging, and documentary" and wrote that he regards it as a "truthful film."
