= Earthquake in Chile (film) =

- DVD cover
- Based on: The Earthquake in Chile by Heinrich von Kleist
- Written by: Helma Sanders-Brahms
- Directed by: Helma Sanders-Brahms
- Music by: Johann Sebastian Bach
- Country of origin: West Germany
- Original language: German

Production
- Producer: Helmut Rasp
- Cinematography: Dietrich Lohmann
- Editor: Thierry Derocles
- Running time: 86 minutes
- Production companies: Luis Megino Producciones Cinematograficás; Filmverlag der Autoren GmbH; Zweites Deutsches Fernsehen

Original release
- Release: 21 March 1975

Earthquake in Chile (German: Das Erdbeben in Chili) is a 1975 West German television drama film directed by Helma Sanders-Brahms. The film is an adaptation of the Heinrich von Kleist novella The Earthquake in Chile.

== Plot ==
Handsome Jeronimo Rugera is hired to tutor rich heiress Josephe Asteron. They fall in love, yet the church forbids their relationship, and Josephe is hidden in a convent. When the church discovers she is pregnant, Josephe is sentenced to death by decapitation. Jeronimo tracks her down, yet is jailed before he can rescue her. When fate intervenes in the form of a massive earthquake, the two lovers have no idea what is in store for them. Sanders-Brahms uses a voice-over of the first and final sentences of the book, placing them at the beginning and end of the film.

== Analysis ==
According to critic Elaine Martin, author of the scholarly article "Rewrites and Remakes: Screen Adaptations of Romantic Works," the film director "erases the uncanny aspect of Kleist's tale and replaces it with a socio-political explanation" and intended to politicize the earthquake narrative's context in a higher degree compared to the original work. For the adaptation Sanders-Brahms uses parallel plotlines that intersect in the end instead of the flashbacks used in the original work. Sanders-Brahms created story segments referred to by Martin as "pre-stories, as it were." Martin states that the new segments "locate" the characters "socially and temperamentally." In addition Sanders-Brahms removed the nineteenth century Prussia context, what Martin calls "the stage that represents Kleist's narrative filter." The author added that the ending of the film is "less sanguine" compared to the novella because the director added a "veiled reference" to the "economic value" of the surviving child. The child is scheduled to inherit the wealth of the parents, who are dead. She further wrote that in the film Don Fernando is "a coolly calculating businessman, shaped by a bourgeois business mentality" instead of a "divine hero."

== Cast ==
- Julia Peña as Josephe Asteron (German voice: Maddalena Kerrh)
- Victor Alcázar as Jeronimo Rugera (German voice: Fred Maire)
- Juan Amigo as Don Fernando Ormez (German voice: Manfred Schott)
- María Jesús Hoyos as Dona Elvira Ormez (German voice: Lis Kertelge)
- María Vico as Dona Elisabeth Ormez (German voice: Helga Trümper)
- Antonio Gamero as Shoemaker Pedrillo (German voice: Bruno W. Pantel)
- Raquel Rodrigo as Shoemaker Pedrillo's Wife (German voice: Marianne Wischmann)
- Antonio Requena as Barber (German voice: Mogens von Gadow)
- Ángel Álvarez as Bishop (German voice: Erik Jelde)
- José Villasante as Familiar (German voice: Alois Maria Giani)
- Miguel Angel Andes as Dominican (German voice: Rüdiger Bahr)
- Fernando Villena as Don Henrico Asteron (German voice: Wolf Ackva)
- Marisa Porcel as Warden's Wife (German voice: Emely Reuer)
- Fernando Sánchez Polack as Warden (German voice: Norbert Gastell)
- Francisco Ortuño as Mestizo (German voice: Fred Klaus)
- María de la Riva as Indian Woman (German voice: Lisa Helwig)

== Release ==
The film was released on DVD by Facets Multi-Media in 2009.

== Reception ==
Film critic Greg Titian wrote a generally negative review of the film in which he stated that "Earthquake in Chile throws the audience into the story with scant setup. Narration at the opening sets the scene in a way that was dissatisfying to this reviewer [...] I felt that Earthquake in Chile made emotional demands on the audience without properly establishing an emotional attachment in the audience to those characters [...] Perhaps I missed the point, or the historical significance of this particular piece of German cinema, but the predictable storyline, in my estimation, ultimately falls a bit flat," though he nevertheless praised the fact that the "DVD sports a very high quality transfer." Der Spiegel's critic Siegfried Schober's review made similar negative remarks.

== Legacy ==
The director made the 1977 film Heinrich because, during work on Earthquake in Chile, she developed an interest in the work's original author.

== Bibliography ==
- Martin, Elaine. "Rewrites and Remakes: Screen Adaptations of Romantic Works." In: Gillespie, Gerald, Manfred Engel, and Bernard Dieterle (editors). Romantic Prose Fiction. John Benjamins Publishing Company, 2008, p. 664ff. ISBN 9027234566, 9789027234568.
