= Laputa (German film) =

1986 film

- Film poster
- Directed by: Helma Sanders-Brahms
- Written by: Helma Sanders-Brahms
- Produced by: Udo Heiland; Joachim von Vietinghoff
- Starring: Sami Frey; Krystyna Janda
- Cinematography: Eberhard Geick
- Edited by: Eva Schlensag
- Release date: May 1986
- Running time: 92 minutes
- Country: West Germany
- Language: German

Laputa is a 1986 West German drama film directed by Helma Sanders-Brahms. It was screened in the Un Certain Regard section at the 1986 Cannes Film Festival.

== Cast ==
- Sami Frey as Paul
- Krystyna Janda as Malgorzata
