= No Mercy, No Future =

- Theatrical release poster
- Directed by: Helma Sanders-Brahms
- Written by: Helma Sanders-Brahms
- Produced by: Helma Sanders-Brahms
- Cinematography: Thomas Mauch
- Edited by: Ursula West; Hanni Lawerenz; Bettina Böhler
- Music by: Manfred Opitz; Harald Grosskopf
- Production company: Helma Sanders-Brahms Filmproduktion GmbH
- Distributed by: Basis-Film-Verleih GmbH
- Release date: 1 November 1981 (Hof International Film Festival)
- Running time: 108 minutes
- Country: West Germany
- Language: German

No Mercy, No Future (German: Die Berührte, "The Touched") is a 1981 West German drama film directed by Helma Sanders-Brahms.

== Plot ==
Veronika Christoph, the troubled daughter of uncaring bourgeois parents, has been institutionalized due to her schizophrenia. Without proper psychiatric treatment for her unearthly visions, she prowls the streets along the Berlin Wall at night in search of God, yet settles for the company of strange, exiled men.

== Cast ==
- Elisabeth Stepanek as Veronika Christoph
- Jorge Reis as Demba
- Curt Curtini as Magician
- Hasan Hasan as Monsef
- Carola Regnier as Physician
- Hubertus von Weyrauch as Veronika's Father
- Irmgard Mellinger as Veronika's Mother
- Nguyen Chi Danh as Patient
- Erich Koltschack as Old Man
- George Stamkoski as Greek Man
- Karl Heinz Reimann as God's Son
- Abdel Wahed Askar as Ibrahim
- Nabil Reiroumi as Salem
- Harald Hoedt as Patient
- Erika Dannhoff as Countess
- Günther Ehlert as Death

== Release ==
The film was released on DVD by Facets Multi-Media in 2008.

== Reception ==
Thomas Elsaesser, author of European Cinema: Face to Face with Hollywood, wrote that No Mercy, No Future was a "relative" failure in the commercial and critical aspects compared to Germany, Pale Mother and that the situation "may have led Sanders-Brahms in the direction of the European art cinema." London's Time Out has referred to the film's performances as faultless and it was screened at the 1982 Berlin International Film Festival and won the British Film Institute's Sutherland Trophy Award for 1981. Critic Michael Atkinson praised the film as a "classic, show-it-all acting coup that doesn’t wriggle free of your memory very easily."
