= 1647 Santiago earthquake =

- Location within Chile
- Local date: May 13, 1647
- Magnitude: Unknown
- Epicenter: 33.4°S 70.6°W
- Areas affected: Chile
- Max. intensity: MMI XI (Extreme)
- Tsunami: None
- Casualties: 1,000

The 1647 Santiago earthquake struck Santiago, Chile on the night of 13 May (22:30 local time, 02:30 UTC on 14 May) and is said to have brought virtually every building in the city to the ground. The earthquake was felt throughout the so-called Captaincy General of Chile, an administrative territory of the Spanish Empire. The maximum felt intensity was XI (Extreme) on the Mercalli intensity scale and there were about a thousand casualties.

== Tectonic setting ==
Chile lies along the destructive plate boundary between the Nazca plate and the South American plate.

== Damage ==
The earthquake was the most damaging in the history of Santiago. Damaged buildings included the Iglesia San Agustín (Saint Augustine Church). Inside the church, the Cristo de Mayo crucifix was undamaged except for its crown of thorns which had fallen to Christ's neck, despite the diameter of the crown being smaller than that of the head. The Bishop of Santiago, friar Gaspar de Villaroel, salvaged the image from the debris and dragged it from the church to the Plaza de Armas to display to the gathering survivors.

== Characteristics ==
Extreme ground motion was felt between the Choapa and Maule rivers for 500 km (310 mi) extending north–south. However, documented destruction was only limited to Santiago. The origin of the earthquake is not known with certainty, although from contemporary reports, it appears unlikely to have been a megathrust event. It may have been either an extensional event within the Wadati–Benioff zone (such as in 1939 and 1950), or a shallow focus intraplate event, possibly along the San Ramón Fault. However, no evidence for rupture along the San Ramón Fault exists which leaves a possibility for other faults of the West Andean fold and thrust belt a candidate. For a megathrust event, its damage extent is comparable to the 1906 Valparaíso earthquake, which places the estimated magnitude at M_{s} 8.0. No tsunami was reported immediately following the earthquake.

== Aftermath ==
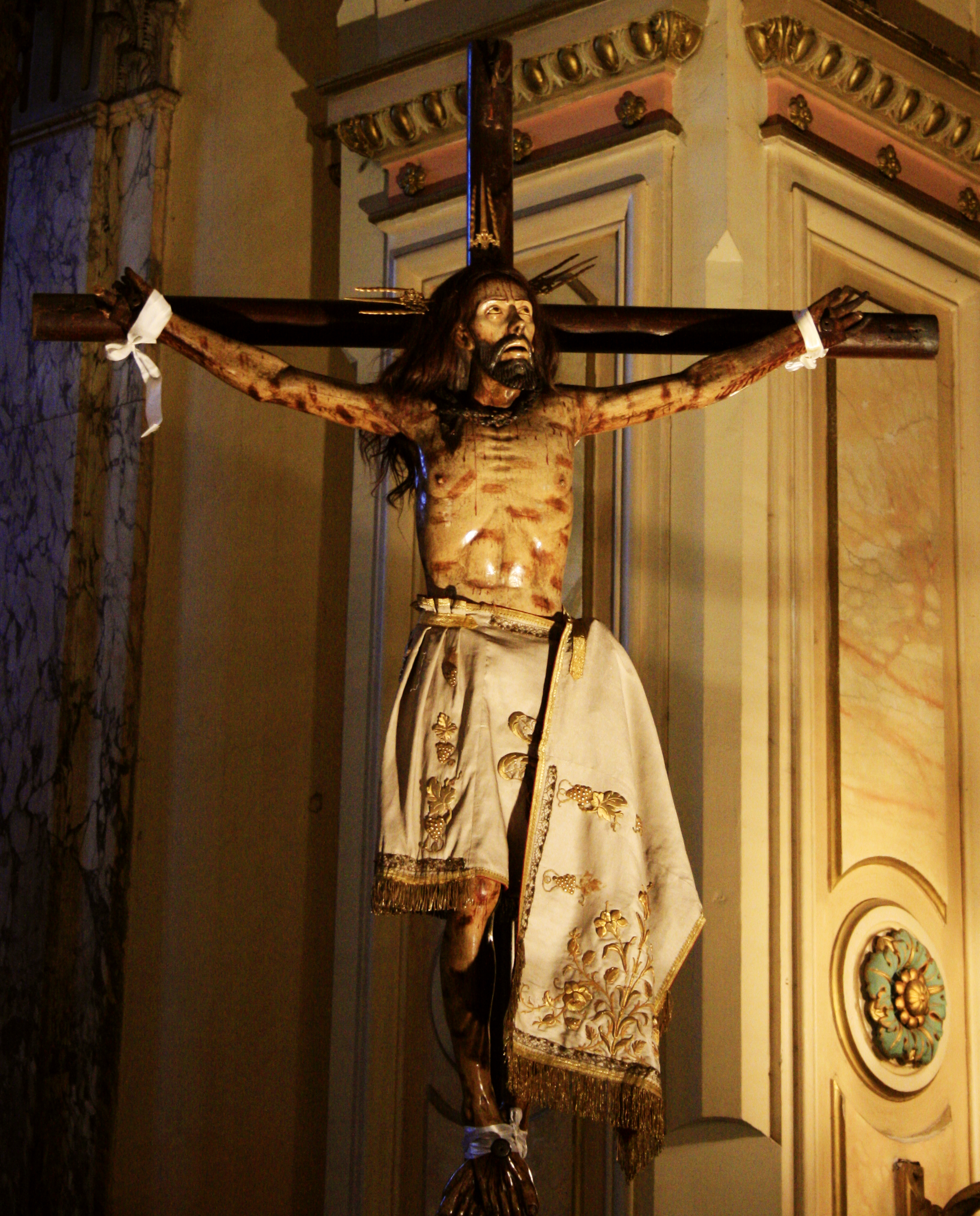
Crucifix of Cristo de Mayo, conserved in the church since 1612.

After the earthquake the Cristo de Mayo crucifix was kept in the home of the landowner Catalina de los Ríos y Lisperguer, better known as La Quintrala, until her death in 1665. Each year since 1647 on May 13, many townspeople gather to commemorate the earthquake.

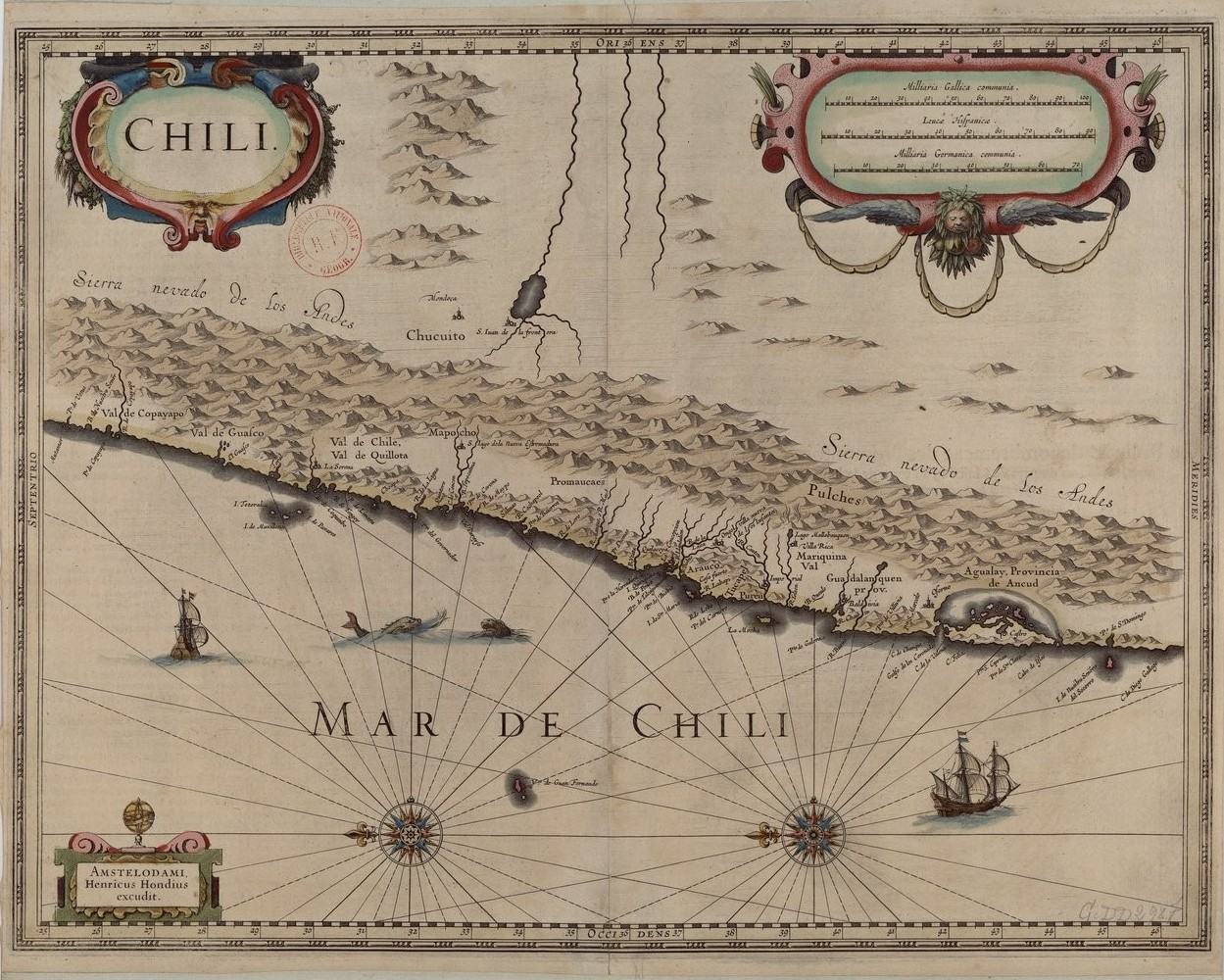
Map of the Captaincy General of Chile in 1640 by Jan Janssonius

Some days after the earthquakes the city was affected by heavy rains which made the problems of sanitation worse. Over the next few weeks an estimated 2,000 people died of "chabalongo", the name then used for typhus.

Due to the high level of damage caused by the earthquake the government considered moving the capital a few kilometers farther north (in the area that is currently known as Quillota). The decision was made, however, to reconstruct Santiago on the same site.

Gaspar de Villarroel, Bishop of Santiago, said that the earthquake should not be considered as divine punishment for the sins of the inhabitants, adding that "it will be a mortal sin to judge that their (the citizens') sins destroyed this city".

== In literature ==
The earthquake was the subject of a short story, The Earthquake in Chile, by the German author Heinrich von Kleist, published in 1807.

== See also ==
- List of earthquakes in Chile
- List of historical earthquakes
