= 3 Engel für Ali =

- Directed by: Roman Schaible
- Written by: Roman Schaible
- Produced by: Eimsbush Entertainment
- Starring: Bülent Çelebi; Tobias Iliev-Granow; Murat Arslan; Ayhan Isik; Süleyman Kaplan
- Cinematography: Florian Kaiser
- Edited by: Lasse Sauerland
- Music by: Toby Digg
- Release date: 2003
- Running time: 33 minutes
- Country: Germany
- Languages: German, Turkish

3 Engel für Ali is a German film written and directed by Roman Schaible. It was released in 2003 and is the second of seven films in total for which he has performed a significant role.

== Synopsis ==
The picaresque comedy tells the story of the Hamburg street dealer Ali. He leads a rather dodgy life. He stretches his grass with garden cress. He is also addicted to drugs and alcohol. His only contacts are three owners of a tailor shop, also from Turkey. With posed Polaroid photos he deceives his parents living in Turkey that he has a successful career. When his parents announce their surprise visit to Germany, Ali has only one day to find a way out of this dilemma. First he tries gambling, losing all of his remaining money. Then he tries to double cross a dealer with adulterated cocaine, but he turns out to be an undercover investigator. Ali narrowly escapes, but loses his packet of drugs. In addition he manages to irritate his accomplices.

The three tailors help him find a solution. He will seal from the Norwegian, who has cheated the tailors by passing off second-rate goods. The Norwegian has just got a new deal in the works. In the parking lot where the handover is to take place the Norwegian, his buyer, the undercover agents, and Ali meet. Ali not only steals the suitcase with the money, but also attempts to steal the car, but is stopped by one of the gangsters. The policeman arrives just in time and goes after the attacker. Ali takes advantage of the confusion and gets away in the car. He escapes with the suitcase, and takes it back to the tailor shop. There his accomplice from the drug deal shows up, but the three tailors hide Ali. He needs to go underground for a few days. After packing he opens the suitcase and a dye packet explodes in his face and all over his white tee shirt. At that moment the doorbell rings—his family is there.

== Background ==
Schaible has his roots with the Hamburg Hip Hop label Eimsbush. After working as a lighting technician for various cinema and television productions and later gaining initial directing experience with music videos, he made the 33-minute short feature film 3 Engel für Ali in 2003. The colour film was produced in German and Turkish with German subtitles. In 2003 it was shown as part of the programme at the Hof International Film Festival.

The leading role is played by Bülent Çelebi, the hip-hop musician also known as B-Low. His partner in the hip-hop duo Tobias "Tobby Digg" Iliev-Granow also plays a leading role. Other roles include the rappers Ayhan "Big A" Isik and Süleyman "Sly Da Man" Kaplan, who also come from the Eimsbush area.

== Film Festival Showings ==
- 2003: Hof International Film Festival.
