= Ab Morgen =

2011 film

- Film poster
- Directed by: Stefan Elsenbruch; Raphael Wallner
- Screenplay by: Stefan Elsenbruch; Raphael Wallner
- Starring: Anno Koehler; Gordana Heyden-Gueli; Sabina Sidro; Adem Smailhodzic
- Cinematography: Fabian Spang
- Edited by: Daniel Falk
- Music by: Philipp F. Kölmel
- Production company: Black Rabbit Pictures
- Release date: 20 January 2011 (Max Ophüls Festival)
- Running time: 24 minutes
- Country: Germany
- Language: German

Ab Morgen is a German film directed by Raphael Wallner. It was released in 2011.
