= Adaptatziya =

- DVD cover
- Directed by: Vulo Radev
- Written by: Vulo Radev, Raina Tomova
- Produced by: Hristo Yotzov
- Starring: Eli Skorcheva
- Cinematography: Hristo Totev
- Edited by: Veska Savcheva
- Music by: Mitko Shterev
- Distributed by: BNT
- Release date: 22 June 1981
- Running time: 165 minutes
- Country: Bulgaria
- Language: Bulgarian

Adaptatziya (Bulgarian language:Адаптация, English language: Adaptation) is a 1981 Bulgarian social drama film directed and written by Vulo Radev. The film is centred on important social themes and issues. The film premiered on 22 June 1981 in Bulgaria. The film was produced by BNT.

== Cast ==
- Eli Skorcheva .... Veronika
- Antony Genov .... D-r Bankov
- Ivan Grigorov .... D-r Galabov
- Nikolai Sotirov .... Kostadin
- Lyuben Chatalov .... Bogomil
- Elena Kuneva .... Rositza
- Neli Valkanova .... Hristina
- Anya Pencheva .... Zhechka
- Ilia Karaivanov .... Asen
- Yuri Manolov .... Delyan
- Veselin Atanasov .... Dimitar
- Marina Marinova .... Evelina
- Vihar Stoychev .... Rumen
- Konstantin Dimchev .... Prof, Shtarbanov
- Jordan Mutafov .... Dotzent Engyozov

== See also ==
- List of Bulgarian films
