= Gernot Böhme =

German philosopher and author (1937–2022)

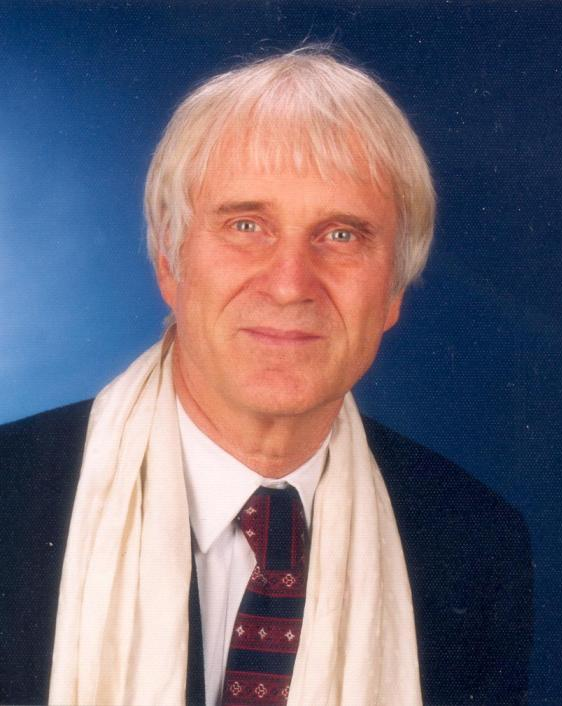
Gernot Böhme

Gernot Böhme (3 January 1937 – 20 January 2022) was a German philosopher and author, contributing to the philosophy of science, theory of time, aesthetics, ethics, and philosophical anthropology. He is the main pioneer of German ecocriticism, the study of the relationship between culture and the environment. He has been the director of the Institute for Practical Philosophy in Darmstadt, Hesse, since 2005. Despite being one of Germany's most acclaimed public intellectuals, very little of his work has so far been translated into English.

== Biography ==
Böhme was born in Dessau, Anhalt, Germany. He studied mathematics, physics, and philosophy at the University of Göttingen and at the Hamburg University, and completed a PhD in 1965 at Hamburg University. As a research scientist he worked at the Max-Planck-Institute with Carl Friedrich von Weizsäcker. From 1977 to 2002 he was Professor of Philosophy at Technical University of Darmstadt. He died on 20 January 2022, at the age of 85.

== Books ==
German

- 1974 Zeit und Zahl. Vittorio Klosterman. Frankfurt am Main
- 1989 Für eine ökologische Naturästhetik. Suhrkamp Verlag
- 1995 Atmosphäre: Essays zur neuen Ästhetik. Frankfurt am Main
- 1996 (with Hartmut Böhme) Feuer, Wasser, Erde, Luft: Eine Kulturgeschichte der Elemente. München, Beck
- 1999 Theorie des Bildes. Fink, München
- 2001 Aisthetik. Vorlesungen über Ästhetik als allgemeine Wahrnehmungslehre, Fink
- 2002 Die Natur vor uns. Naturphilosophie in pragmatischer Hinsicht. Kusterdingen
- 2003 Der Typ Sokrates, Suhrkamp
- 2005 Goethes Faust als philosophischer Text. Die Graue Edition, Kusterdingen
- 2006 Architektur und Atmosphäre. München
- 2008 Invasive Technisierung. Technikphilosophie und Technikkritik. Kusterdingen
- 2008 Ethik leiblicher Existenz. Über unseren moralischen Umgang mit der eigenen Natur. Suhrkamp, Frankfurt am Main

English translations

- 2001 Ethics in Context: The Art of Dealing with Serious Questions, Polity
- 2012 Invasive Technification: Critical Essays in the Philosophy of Technology, Continuum
- 2017 Atmospheric Architectures: The Aesthetics of Felt Spaces, Bloomsbury
- 2017 Critique of Aesthetic Capitalism, Mimesis
