= Filmdienst =

German film magazine

- Categories: Film magazine
- Frequency: Monthly
- First issue: 1947
- Language: German
- Website: www.filmdienst.de

Filmdienst (also spelled Film-Dienst) is the oldest German-language film magazine, with fortnightly print editions published in West Germany and later in Germany between 1947 and 2017. It stopped printed publications due to poor sales and transitioned to an all-digital format in January 2018.

== History and profile ==
The magazine was founded in 1947 as Filmdienst der Jugend, as the official organ of the Katholischen Filmkommission (Catholic Film Commission), and was renamed Filmdienst in 1949. From the 1960s onwards, it gradually became independent of Catholic hierarchies and principles. In 1987 the magazine staff started compiling the Lexikon des Internationalen Films ("Encyclopaedia of International Films"). In 2013, the magazine was rebooted with renewed contents and design, but it failed to significantly improve its sales. The Germany's oldest publication of film criticism, as of 2015 it had a paid circulation of less than 3,000 copies. In January 2018 it was relaunched in an online form, with improved content.
