= Helma Sanders-Brahms =

German film director, screenwriter, producer and actress (1940–2014)

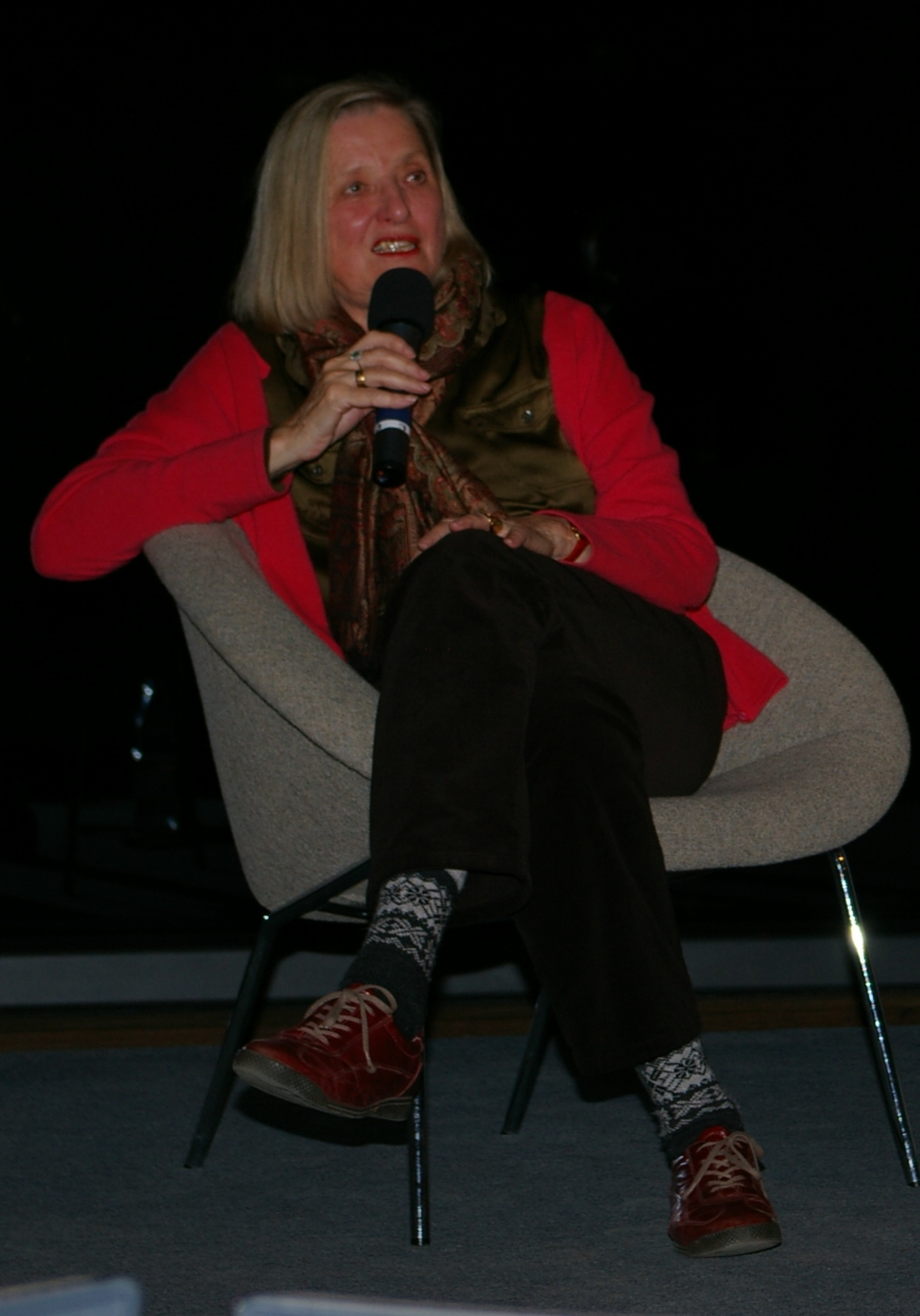
- Sanders-Brahms in 2011
- Born: Helma Sanders; 20 November 1940; Emden, Germany
- Died: 27 May 2014 (aged 73); Berlin, Germany
- Occupations: Film director; Screenwriter; Film producer
- Years active: 1971–2014
- Movement: New German Cinema

Helma Sanders-Brahms (20 November 1940 – 27 May 2014) was a German film director, screenwriter and producer.

== Biography ==
Helma Sanders was born on 20 November 1940 in Emden, Germany. She attended a school for acting in Hannover from 1960 to 1962, then majored in literature and drama at Cologne University. Her early career involved work as a hospital aide and an on-air announcer for the Cologne television station WDR-3. She produced documentaries and film shorts for the station. During a trip to Italy in 1967, she interned with film directors Pier Paolo Pasolini and Sergio Corbucci, a decisive experience in her choice to pursue film-making.

Beginning in 1969, she made her own films, writing her own screenplays and producing many of her films herself. Her film-making comprised both fiction and documentary films, and many of her films contain a strong autobiographical component.

Her early films engage critically with the themes of labour, migration, and the situation of women in West Germany. Her 1971 television film Gewalt dealt with workers on the assembly line of a Ford Motor Company factory. Her 1973 documentary film Die Maschine was awarded the FIPRESCI Prize. Under the Pavement Lies the Strand was a central film for the German women's movement and for the student movement, as well as for the director's own emergence as an explicitly feminist film-maker. The controversial made-for-television movie Shirin's Wedding depicted the tragic death of a Turkish migrant to Germany, addressing the subject of forced marriage. From her reading of classic German literature, she developed a special sympathy for the work of Heinrich von Kleist. At least three of her films are either based on, or explicitly refer to, that author.

In the late 1970s, Sanders-Brahms' films turned away from political themes and towards radical subjectivism, linking mother-daughter relationships to the tumultuous history of Germany. She gained international recognition with Germany, Pale Mother, which addresses German women's experiences during and after the Nazi period. As a director of the New German Cinema movement, her scripts focus on the concerns of the political left. Her final theatrical film Geliebte Clara ("Beloved Clara") concerned the love triangle between Robert Schumann, Clara Schumann, and Johannes Brahms. Her films have been awarded many prizes at festivals worldwide. In 1982, she was a member of the jury at the 32nd Berlin International Film Festival.

== Honours ==
She was made an Officier of the French Ordre des Arts et des Lettres and a member of the Academy of Arts, Berlin.

== Death ==
Sanders-Brahms died in Berlin on 27 May 2014 of cancer, aged 73.

== Legacy ==
Abroad, Sanders-Brahms was highly received by film critics from countries such as the United States, France, Japan, and the United Kingdom. In her home country of Germany however, her work was not as well regarded. German critics found her films "heavyhanded" and "navel-gazing." Shortly before her death, she was quoted saying: "Before I die, I’d just like to make one last attempt to rescue my films from oblivion in my country and say: at least have a look at them".

== Selected filmography ==
- Violence (1971, TV film)
- The Employee (1972, TV film)
- The Machine (1973)
- The Last Days of Gomorrah (1974, TV film)
- Under the Pavement Lies the Strand (1975)
- Earthquake in Chile (1975, TV film)
- Shirin's Wedding (1976)
- Heinrich (1977)
- Germany, Pale Mother (1980)
- No Mercy, No Future (1981)
- The Future of Emily (1984)
- Laputa (1986)
- Felix (Segment: "Er am Ende") (1988, anthology film)
- Apple Trees (1992)
- My Heart Is Mine Alone (1997)
- Geliebte Clara (2008)

== See also ==
- Women in Germany
