= A sega nakade? =

A sega nakade
- Directed by: Rangel Vulchanov
- Written by: Georgi Danailov
- Produced by: Dimitar Gologanov
- Starring: Albena Stavreva
- Cinematography: Radoslav Spassov
- Edited by: Yordanka Bachvarova
- Music by: Kiril Donchev
- Distributed by: National Film Center Boyana Film
- Release date: 17 October 1988
- Running time: 93 minutes
- Country: Bulgaria
- Language: Bulgarian

A sega nakade (Bulgarian: А сега накъде, English: And Where Do We Go from Here?) is a 1988 Bulgarian drama film directed by Rangel Vulchanov and written by Georgi Danailov. The film centres on an actor's examination and involves themes of corruption and immorality in important exams.

== Release and acclaim ==
The film was produced by Boyana Film and premiered on 17 October 1988 in Bulgaria.

== Cast ==
- Albena Stavreva as Momicheto Krasi s belega (The Scarred Girl Krasi)
- Ani Vulchanova as Svetla
- Antoaneta Stancheva as Nina
- Georgi Enchev as Montyorat (The Mechanic/Fitter)
- Georgi Staykov as Ivan (as Georgi Staikov)
- Genadi Nikolov as Zdravenyakat (The Tough Guy)
- Darina Georgieva as Manekenkata (The Female Model)
- Dimitar Goranov as Blediyat (The Pale Man)
- Elena Arsova as Toni
- Krasimira Miteva as Bremennata (The Pregnant)
- Konstantin Trendafilov as Buntaryat (The Rebel/Malcontent)
- Iliana Kitanova as Pauzata (The Pause)
- Mariana Milanova as Momicheto s okoto (The Boy With the Eye)
- Mihail Bilalov as Sofiyskoto kopele (The Sofia Bastard)
- Mihail Vitanov as Trompetistat (The Trumpeter)

== See also ==
- List of Bulgarian films
