= Germany, Pale Mother =

1980 film by Helma Sanders-Brahms

- Theatrical release poster
- German: Deutschland bleiche Mutter
- Directed by: Helma Sanders-Brahms
- Written by: Helma Sanders-Brahms
- Produced by: Walter Höllerer; Helma Sanders-Brahms
- Starring: Eva Mattes; Ernst Jacobi
- Cinematography: Jürgen Jürges
- Edited by: Uta Periginelli; Elfie Tillack
- Music by: Jürgen Knieper
- Production companies: Helma Sanders-Brahms Filmproduktion; Literarisches Colloquium; WDR
- Distributed by: Basis-Film Verleih
- Release dates: 20 February 1980 (Berlin); 26 September 1980 (West Germany)
- Running time: 123 minutes
- Country: West Germany
- Language: German

Germany, Pale Mother (German: Deutschland bleiche Mutter) is a 1980 West German drama film written and directed by Helma Sanders-Brahms. It premiered at the 30th Berlin International Film Festival in 1980, where it was nominated for a Golden Bear award. The title is taken from the poem of the same name by Bertolt Brecht.

It was not released in the United States until 1984. The film was restored and re-released on DVD and Blu-ray in the United Kingdom in 2015 by the British Film Institute.

== Plot ==
In the 1930s, Hans is attracted to Lene, the only dark-haired one of a German family of seven sisters. As Hans's friend, Ulrich, is a member of the Nazi party, Lene is reluctant to see Hans but, after ascertaining that Hans is not a Nazi, she agrees to see him, and they eventually marry. On Lene's birthday, she learns that Hans has been conscripted to fight in Poland because he is a low-level bureaucrat who is not in the party, while Ulrich has been spared. In Poland, Hans murders civilians and has a hard time adjusting to war, like many other soldiers. When he returns on leave, he and Lene conceive a child, Anna, who is born during an air raid.

After their home is bombed, Lene takes Anna to see Hans, back on a two-day leave. Though Lene is happy to see him, he becomes jealous of Anna and Anna of him. To keep herself and Anna safe from the war, Lene treks on foot across the country. After the war, she is raped by two American soldiers in front of Anna. Eventually heading home, Lene reunites with a sister and, later, Hans. Over time, their reunion unravels as he is continually paranoid that she was unfaithful when he was away. He is also harsh with Anna over her schoolwork, sporadically beating her and constantly criticizing her. After the war, he reunites with Ulrich, who briefly encourages Anna to tease Hans. The teasing breaks Hans' cheerful mood (whose fragility is likely due to post-traumatic stress), leading him to beat Anna to tears.

Depressed, Lene contracts facial paralysis. Hans comes home, happy about his promotion, to discover his wife's condition. He takes her to the doctor, who informs them that all her teeth must be removed to stop the paralysis from spreading. Against her will Hans, noting that life is more important, orders the extraction. This further isolates and depresses Lene whose facial paralysis persists, who takes to her bed, withdraws from Anna, and wears a veil when she has to go out.

Ulrich and Hans maintain good relations, until one night, after they have been drinking, Hans learns Ulrich has been promoted above him. Ulrich justifies it by his qualifications. Hans, embittered by Ulrich's promotions, no longer attracted to Lene, and tired of her depression, does not react when Lene tells him she does not want to live anymore. He leaves for work, and Lene locks herself in the bathroom, intending to gas herself. Anna cries and begs her to come out, and eventually, she does.

== Cast ==
- Eva Mattes as Lene
- Ernst Jacobi as Hans
- Elisabeth Stepanek as Hanne
- Angelika Thomas as Lydia
- Rainer Friedrichsen as Ulrich
- Gisela Stein as Aunt Ihmchen
- Fritz Lichtenhahn as Uncle Bertrand
- Anna Sanders as Anna

== Awards ==
In 1980, the film won the Grand Prix at the Créteil International Women's Film Festival and was nominated for the Golden Berlin Bear at the 30th Berlin International Film Festival.
