= The Horla =

Short story by Guy de Maupassant

- Short story by Guy de Maupassant
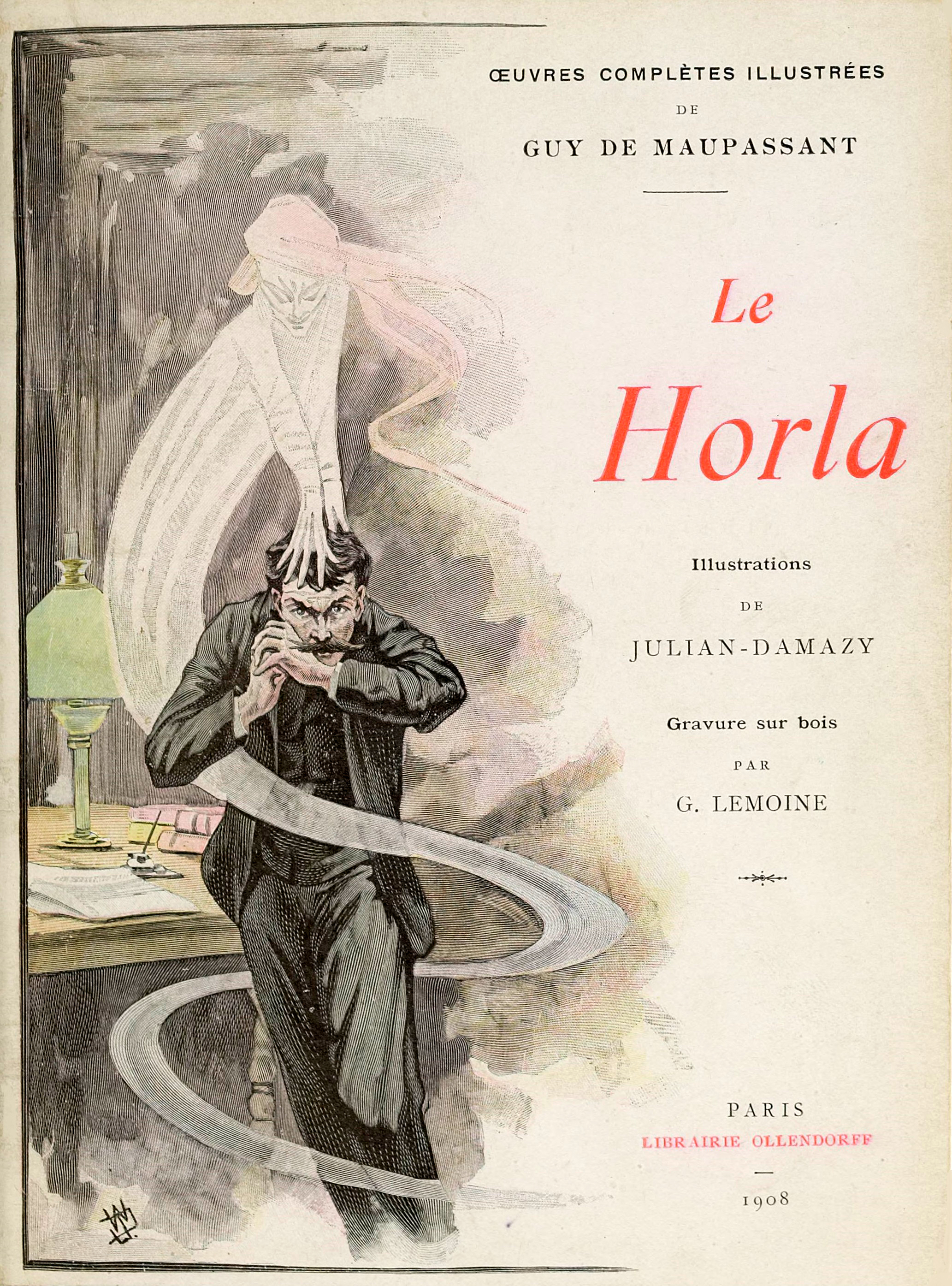
- Cover of the 1908 edition, illustrated by William Julian-Damazy

Text available at Wikisource
- Original title: Le Horla
- Translator: Jonathan Sturges
- Country: France
- Language: French
- Genre: Horror short story

Publication
- Publication date: 1887
- Published in English: 1890

"The Horla" (French: "Le Horla") is an 1887 short horror story written in the style of a journal by the French writer Guy de Maupassant, published in a short story collection of the same title, after an initial (much shorter) version published in the newspaper Gil Blas, October 26, 1886.

The plot concerns a man who believes he has come under the influence of an invisible supernatural entity called the Horla.

The word horla itself is not French, and is a neologism. Charlotte Mandell, who has translated "The Horla" for publisher Melville House, suggests in an afterword that the word "horla" is a portmanteau of the French words hors ("outside"), and là ("there") and that "le horla" sounds like "the Outsider, the outer, the one Out There", and can be transliterally interpreted as "the 'what's out there'".

The story is one of Maupassant’s most famous, and has been a major influence on subsequent fantasy and horror fiction.

== Summary ==
In the form of a journal, the narrator, an upper-class, unmarried, bourgeois man, conveys his troubled thoughts and feelings of anguish. This anguish occurs for four days after he sees a "superb three-mast" Brazilian ship and impulsively waves to it, unconsciously inviting the supernatural being aboard the boat to haunt his home.

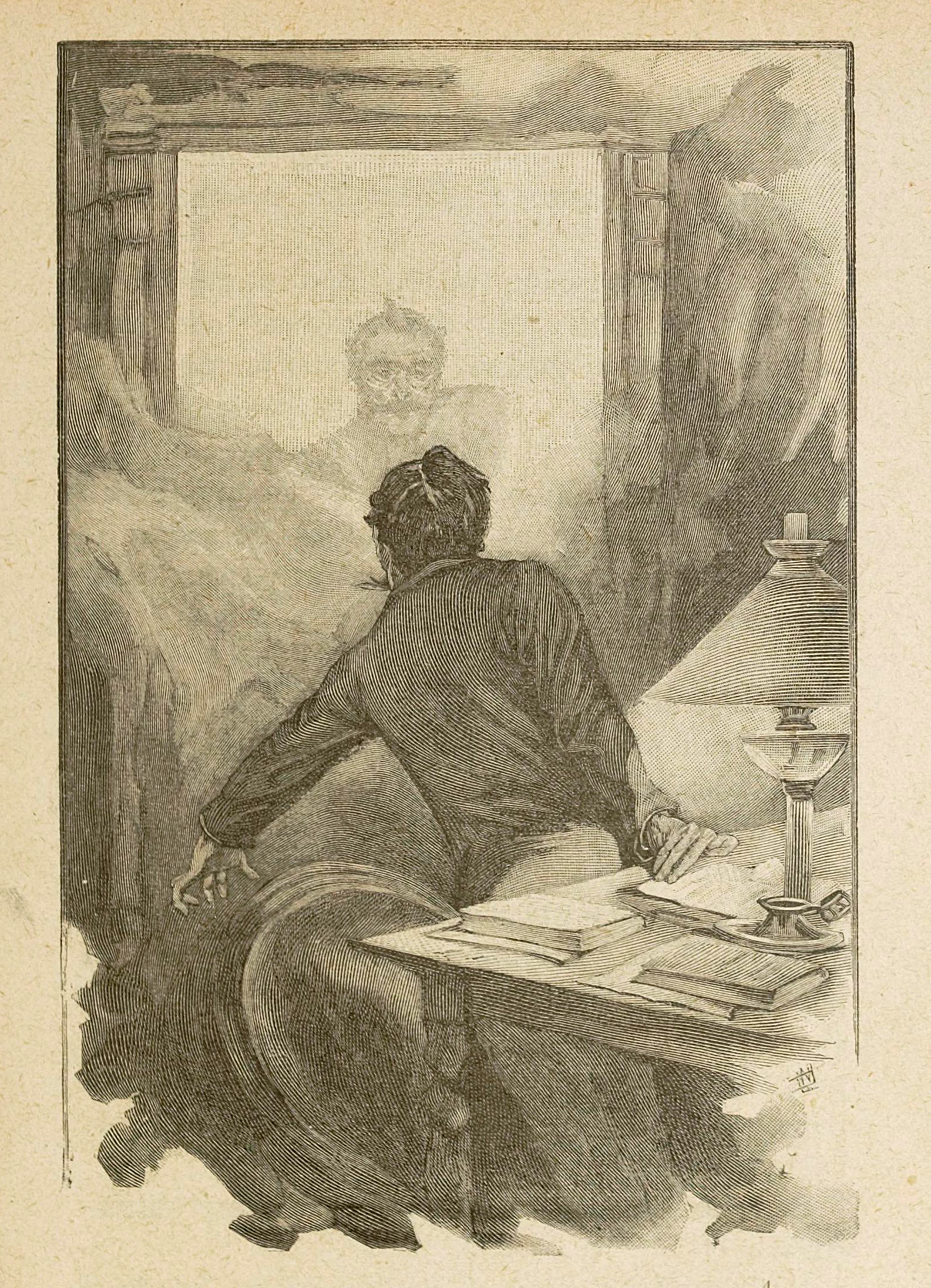

All around him, he senses the presence of a being that he later calls the "Horla". The torment that the Horla causes is first manifested physically: The narrator complains that he suffers from "an atrocious fever", and that he has trouble sleeping. He wakes up from nightmares with the chilling feeling that someone is watching him and "kneeling on [his] chest".

Throughout the short story, the main character's sanity, or rather, his feelings of alienation, are put into question as the Horla progressively dominates his thoughts. Initially, the narrator himself questions his sanity, exclaiming "Am I going mad?" after having found his glass of water empty, despite not having drunk from it. He later decides that he is not, in fact, going mad, since he is fully "conscious" of his "state" and that he could indeed "analyze it with the most complete lucidity." The presence of the Horla becomes more and more intolerable to the protagonist, as it is "watching ... looking at ... [and] dominating" him.

After reading about a large number of Brazilians who fled their homes, bemoaning the fact that "they are pursued, possessed, governed like human cattle by ... a species of vampire, which feeds on their life while they are asleep ... [and] drinks water", the narrator soon realizes the Horla was aboard the Brazilian three-mast boat that he had previously greeted. He feels so "lost" and "possessed" to the point that he is ready to kill the Horla. The narrator traps the Horla in a room and sets fire to the house, but forgets his servants, who perish in the fire. In the last lines of the story, faced with the persistence of the Horla's presence, he concludes suicide to be his only liberation.

== Background ==
While the canonical version of the text is the 1887 novella, two earlier versions of the text demonstrate Maupassant's development of the central premise. Lettre d'un fou, translated into English as "Letter of a Madman", was published in the 17th February 1885 edition of Gil Blas, under the pseudonym 'Maufrigneuse'. In the short story, the narrator writes a letter to a doctor describing his disillusionment with the world and his newfound ability to perceive a parallel invisible world. A later version of the text, also entitled Le Horla, was published in the 26 October 1886 edition of the newspaper Gil Blas. This version also sees the narrator impart his account to a group of doctors; this psychiatric context was dismissed from the final version of the text, which is written in the form of a journal.

Another possible prototype for "The Horla" is Maupassant's short story "Lui?", translated into English as "Him?" and published in the 3rd July 1883 edition of Gil Blas. In the story, the narrator begins to see a figure who appears only when he is alone, and is only referred to as "He" or "Him". This figure inspires such terror in the protagonist that he is forced into marriage in order to resist being alone. These themes of alienation and a fear of solitude reoccur in "The Horla".

It is likely that Maupassant was inspired by his own interest in hypnosis and psychiatry in writing the short story, having frequently attended the lectures of noted neurologist Dr Jean-Martin Charcot. The 1880s in France were a time of great public interest in hypnotism, being promoted boldly for many claimed benefits including treatment of illness and as an anaesthetic. Hypnosis is now regarded by mainstream medicine and science as useful, but in a much narrower sense than in the 1800s. During Maupassants’s life, however, hypnotism was also the subject of much examples of theatre and showmanship, with many attending to witness outlandish and bizarre spectacles. This contrast in the popular perception of hypnotism between the scientific and the supernatural manifests, it has been argued, within "The Horla".

== Major themes ==
The Horla's magnetic influence over the main character puts him in the same literary context as the double or doppelgänger, a field which had previously been explored in Adelbert von Chamisso's Peter Schlemihl (1814), Edgar Allan Poe's "William Wilson" (1839), and Theophile Gautier's Avatar (1856). However, while in the traditional literary form of the double the perceived threat is a physical one capable of autonomy, in "The Horla" the titular creature is instead elusive and invisible, acting as a manifestation of the main character's solitude and anxiety. The Horla is characterised not as a physical being but as a "double-delusion", a means by which the narrator externalises his own depression into the physical world. It is no coincidence that he comes to the realisation that in order to destroy the Horla, he must destroy himself.

The ambiguity as to whether the eponymous Horla is an actual malign entity or a symptom of the narrator's mental illness is a key element of the short story's tension. As the reader is not presented with information external to the protagonist that confirms any of the events of the short story, they are forced to reconcile with the possibility that the narrator is unreliable. Maupassant structures the short story in such a manner that the growing need for an implied reader to settle for an interpretation coincides with the vacillations of the story's protagonist; just as the narrator grows more and more mentally unstable, the ambiguity of what is occurring in the short story, and the corresponding uncertainty in a presumed reader, heightens.

== Legacy ==
=== Literature ===
Reinterpretations of Maupassant's short story occur throughout horror fiction.

The story has been cited as an inspiration for Lovecraft's "The Call of Cthulhu", which also features an extraterrestrial being who influences minds and who is destined to conquer humanity.

In the short story "The Theater Upstairs" (1936) by Manly Wade Wellman, the plot revolves around characters watching a film adaptation of "The Horla". "The Horla" is the inspiration for Robert Sheckley's short story "The New Horla" (2000) in his collection Uncanny Tales. The American horror fiction writer H.P. Lovecraft is said to have been inspired by the story, with his 1928 short story "The Call of Cthulhu" having been particularly influenced by it. In his survey "Supernatural Horror in Literature" (1927), he provides his own interpretation of the story:

Relating the advent in France of an invisible being who lives on water and milk, sways the minds of others, and seems to be the vanguard of a horde of extra-terrestrial organisms arrived on earth to subjugate and overwhelm mankind, this tense narrative is perhaps without peer in its particular department.

The figure of the Horla is a recurring character in Victorian pastiche fiction. In Wellman's novel Sherlock Holmes' War of the Worlds (1975) , Sherlock Holmes suggests to Professor Challenger that the events of "The Horla" might actually be true. Horlas are mentioned or featured in several stories from the Tales of the Shadowmen series, including one story where a Horla menaces occult detective Thomas Carnacki.

Kingsley Amis's first novel Lucky Jim (1954, chapter 6) describes Jim Dixon, a guest lecturer at a university, waking in a guestroom owned by the senior colleague whose good will he is depending on to continue in his job the next academic year, discovering he has fallen asleep drunk, and burned holes through blankets and sheets and on a bedside table. "Had he done this all to himself? Or had a wayfarer, a burglar, camped out in his room? Or was he the victim of some Horla fond of tobacco?"

The Bartimaeus Sequence (2003–2010) features horlas as powerful spirits, who appear as shadowy apparitions that cause madness in humans similar to the titular Horla of the short story.

=== Film and television ===
- The first cinematic adaptation was Zlatcha Notch (1914), translated as "The Terrible Night", by Russian film director Yevgeni Bauer.
- The movie Diary of a Madman (1963) is loosely based on "The Horla".
- Tim Lucas has argued that "The Horla" is also an influence on Mario Bava's story "Telephone", featured in his film Black Sabbath (1963).
- Jean-Daniel Pollet directed a film adaptation called Le Horla in 1966.
- The Star Trek episode "Wolf in the Fold" (1967), scripted by Robert Bloch, features an evil, primordial psychic entity that contains echoes of the Horla.
- Le Horla, a 2023 television film directed by Marion Desseigne-Ravel and starring Bastien Bouillon in the primary role, first broadcast on Arte on 2 June 2023. Freely inspired by Maupassant's story, the film is transposed to the modern day.

=== Radio ===
Maupassant's short story has had a number of different radio adaptations:

- "The Horla" was adapted for the syndicated radio program The Weird Circle in the 1940s.
- "The Horla" was dramatised on a 1st August 1943 episode of Inner Sanctum Mysteries starring Arnold Moss.
- "The Horla" (1947) is episode 8 of Peter Lorre's radio serial Mystery in the Air. This has been considered one of Lorre's most powerful radio performances; in the end of the broadcast, Lorre breaks the boundaries of the narrative by stating the fact that the "real" Peter Lorre is still being menaced by the Horla while broadcasting on the radio.
- The Hall of Fantasy radio show aired an episode on September 5, 1952, called "The Shadow People", which makes reference to the Horla.
- The CBS Radio Mystery Theater adapted the story for episode 49, which originally aired on February 22, 1974. It starred Paul Hecht as Maupassant.

=== Music ===
- "The Horla" is the title of a song from the British heavy metal band Angel Witch, appearing on their 2012 album As Above, So Below.
- The concept album D'Après Le Horla De Maupassant by Canadian progressive rock band The Box is based on "The Horla".
- The third track of French hip-hop artist Nekfeu's debut album, Feu, is entitled "Le Horla".

=== Comics ===
The story was adapted into the comic book Le Horla written by Frédéric Bertocchini and illustrated by Éric Puech. It was first published in 2012 but quickly withdrawn due to a conflict between the publisher and distributor. It was republished in 2022.

Paul and Gaëtan Brizzi made a comic-book adaptation published as Le Horla in 2026.
