= Méditerranée (disambiguation) =

Méditerranée is the French term for the Mediterranean Sea.

Méditerranée may also refer to:

- Méditerranée (department), a department of the First French Empire
- Méditerranée (film), 1936 French experimental film
- Méditerranée Airport, an airport located in Mauguio, Hérault, France, serving Montpellier
