= Volker Schlöndorff =

German filmmaker (born 1939)

- Schlöndorff in 2026
- Born: 31 March 1939 (age 87); Wiesbaden, Germany
- Occupations: Film director, producer, screenwriter, professor
- Years active: 1960–present
- Movement: New German Cinema
- Spouses: Margarethe von Trotta (1971–1991; divorced); Angelika Gruber (? – present)

Signature
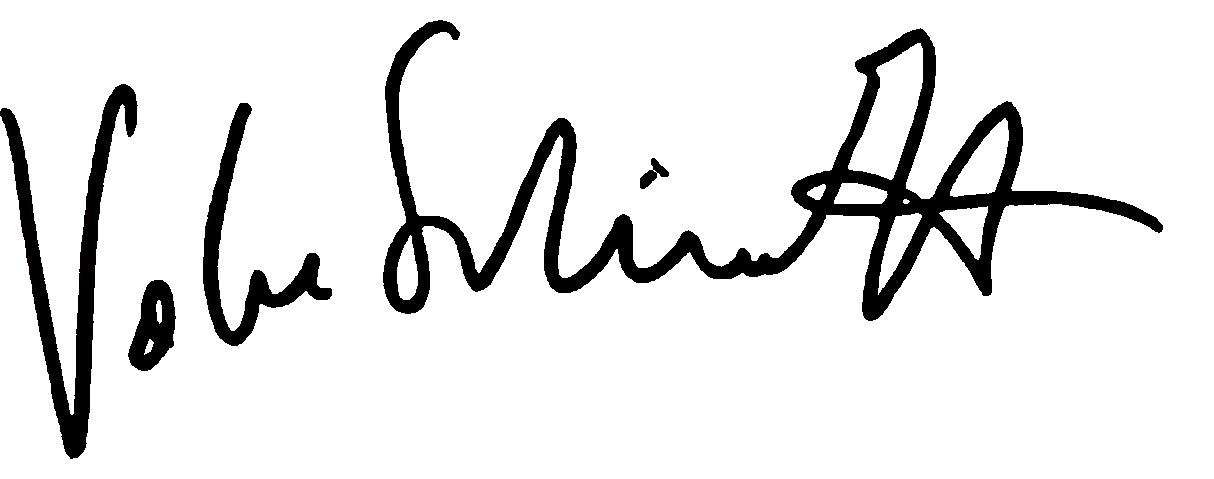

Volker Schlöndorff (German pronunciation: [ˈfɔlkɐ ˈʃløːndɔʁf]; born 31 March 1939) is a German film director, screenwriter, and producer. He was a prominent member of the New German Cinema of the late 1960s and early 1970s, often collaborating with his then-wife and fellow filmmaker Margarethe von Trotta. His 1979 film The Tin Drum, based on Günter Grass' novel of the same name, won the Academy Award for Best Foreign Language Film and the Palme d'Or at the 1979 Cannes Film Festival.

Especially known for his literature adaptions, other notable films have included The Lost Honor of Katharina Blum (1975, co-directed with von Trotta), the documentary Germany in Autumn (1978), Swann in Love (1984), Death of a Salesman (1985), The Handmaid's Tale (1990), Voyager (1991), The Ogre (1996), and Diplomacy (2014). He is also a Professor of film and literature at the European Graduate School, and a founding member of the Deutsche Filmakademie.

== Early life ==
Volker Schlöndorff was born in Wiesbaden, then part of Nazi Germany, to the physician Georg Schlöndorff. His mother was killed in a kitchen fire in 1944. His family moved to Paris in 1956, where Schlöndorff won awards at school for his work in philosophy. He graduated in political science at the Sorbonne, while at the same time studying film at the Institut des hautes études cinématographiques, where he was friends with Bertrand Tavernier and met Louis Malle. Malle gave him his first job as his assistant director on Zazie in the Metro (1960), which continued with the films A Very Private Affair (1962), The Fire Within (1963), and Viva Maria! (1965). Schlöndorff also worked as assistant director on Alain Resnais's Last Year at Marienbad and Jean-Pierre Melville's Léon Morin, Priest (both 1961). During this time he also made his first short film, Who Cares?, about French people living in Frankfurt in 1960. He collaborated with filmmaker Jean-Daniel Pollet on the 40-minute documentary Méditerranée, released in 1963. The film is highly regarded, gaining praise from Jean-Luc Godard and consistently appearing in the popular book 1001 Movies You Must See Before You Die.

== Career ==
=== Early works ===
Schlöndorff returned to Germany to make his feature film debut, Young Törless (Der junge Törless, 1966). Produced by Malle and based on Robert Musil's novel The Confusions of Young Törless, it debuted at the 1966 Cannes Film Festival. Taking place at a semi-military Austrian boarding school, Törless witnesses the bullying of a fellow student but does nothing to prevent it despite his superior and mature intellect. He gradually begins to accept his personal responsibility for the abuse through his inaction and runs away from the school. The analogy to prewar Germany is obvious and the film was highly praised upon release, winning the FIPRESCI Prize at Cannes.

The New German Cinema movement unofficially began in 1962 with the Oberhausen Manifesto, calling new young German filmmakers to revitalize filmmaking in Germany, much like the French New Wave of the previous few years. Although not among the initial group of filmmakers involved, Schlöndorff was quick to align himself with the group and Young Törless is considered one of its most important films.

Schlöndorff's next film was Degree of Murder (1967), a counter-culture-saturated film with a musical score by Rolling Stones guitarist Brian Jones. The film stars Jones's then girlfriend Anita Pallenberg as a young waitress who accidentally kills her boyfriend and hides the body with the help of two male friends. The film was very popular upon release among "swinging sixties" youths.

He then made another film that spoke to the counter-culture generation, Man on Horseback (Michael Kohlhaas – Der Rebell, 1969), set in medieval Germany. Michael Kohlhaas is a horse trader who has been cheated by a local nobleman and nearly starts a revolution to get revenge. The film starred David Warner, Anna Karina and Anita Pallenberg, and was made in both German and English versions.

Schlöndorff then worked on Baal (1970), an adaptation for West German television of Bertolt Brecht's first play, and cast Rainer Werner Fassbinder in the lead role, along with Margarethe von Trotta, whom Schlöndorff married in 1971. Schlöndorff adapted the story of a self-destructive poet to modern-day Munich. He then made another TV movie, The Sudden Wealth of the Poor People of Kombach (1971), also starring Fassbinder. The film depicts seven peasants in 19th-century Germany who rob the local tax collection cart but are so conditioned by their poverty that they cannot handle their newfound wealth.

The Morals of Ruth Halbfass (1972) examines a group of people who have lost their sense of morals and co-stars von Trotta. Von Trotta both starred in and co-wrote Schlöndorff's next film, A Free Woman (Strohfeuer, 1972). The film took a feminist look at the condition of modern women in Munich. Von Trotta plays Elizabeth Junker, a recently divorced woman who must struggle to live her life independently as her husband has everything come easily to him, including the villa and son they shared together as a married couple. The film is loosely based on von Trotta's experience of divorcing her first husband.

Schlöndorff then completed the TV movie Stayover in Tyrol (Übernachtung in Tirol, 1974); directed his first opera in Frankfurt, a production of Leoš Janáček's Káťa Kabanová, in the same year; and adapted the Henry James novella Georgina's Reasons as Les raisons de Georgina (1975) for French TV.

=== International success ===
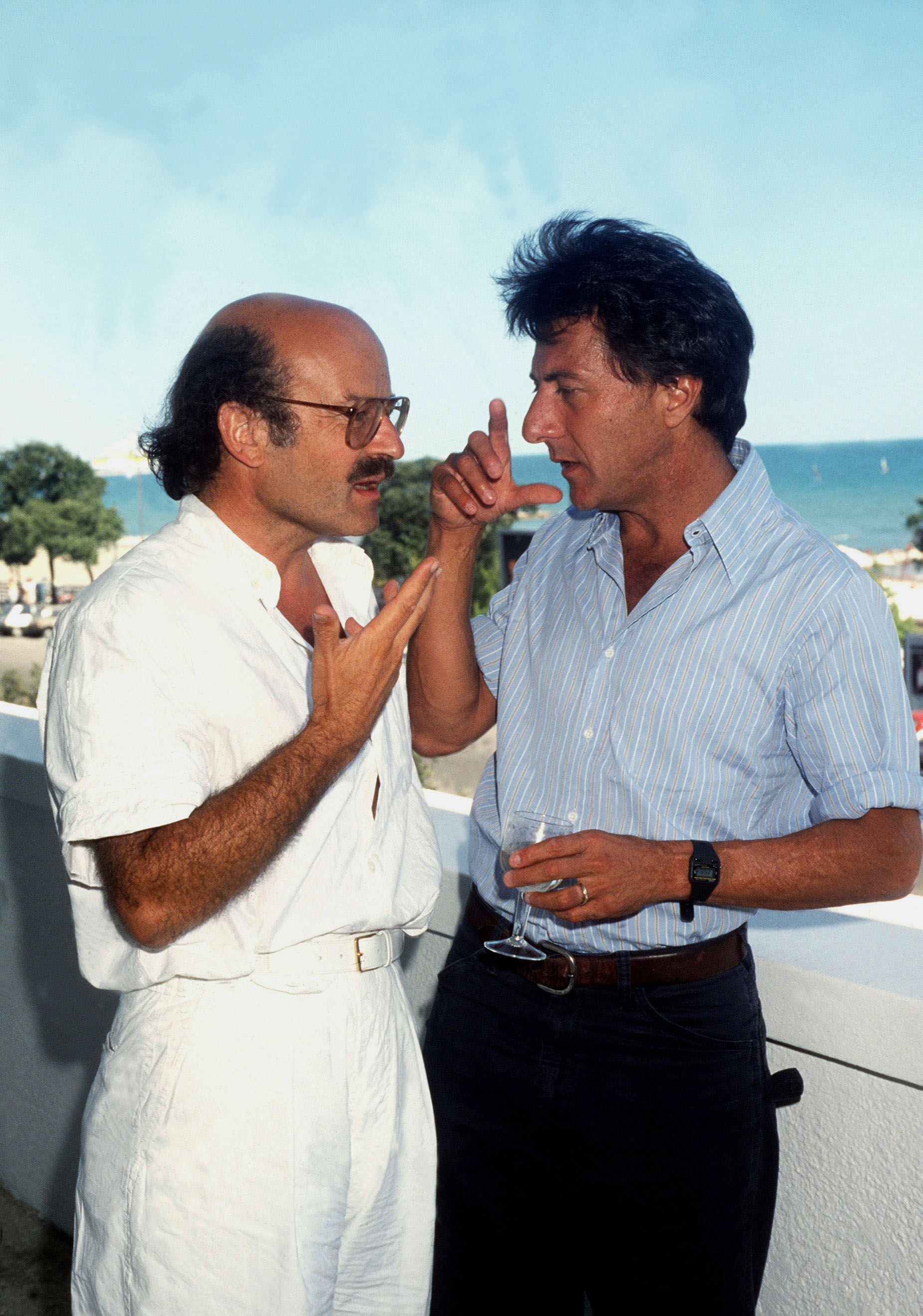
Schlöndorff (left) with Dustin Hoffman at the 1984 Venice International Film Festival

Schlöndorff (and the New German Cinema movement as a whole) had his first financial hit film with The Lost Honor of Katharina Blum (1975). Based on the novel by Heinrich Böll, Schlöndorff co-wrote and co-directed the film with von Trotta, in her directorial debut. The film stars Angela Winkler as Blum, who after falling in love and spending the night with a young army deserter becomes the victim of a corrupt police investigation and predatory tabloid newspaper, which cast her as both a terrorist and a prostitute. The newspaper is based upon the real right-wing German tabloid Bild-Zeitung, whose publisher Axel Springer was the inspiration for the character Werner Tötges.

In Schlöndorff's view, West Germany had fallen into political hysteria over the activities of a terrorist group, the Red Army Faction. The police and journalistic activities in both Böll's novel and Schlöndorff's film portray the Red Army Faction era as reminiscent of McCarthyism in the 1950s U.S., including illegal police raids, phone tapping and tabloid smears. Böll was heavily attacked after the publication of the novel, but both it and the film were hugely successful in West Germany.

After directing his second opera, We Come to the River, in 1976, Schlöndorff followed The Lost Honor of Katharina Blum with the equally political Coup de Grâce (1976). Based on a novel by French author Marguerite Yourcenar, the film stars von Trotta (who co-wrote the script) as Sophie von Reval, a young left-wing aristocrat who sides with the Bolshevik Revolution after being rejected by a young German soldier preparing to fight the Red Army in 1919. The film depicts the same time period and subject matter that von Trotta revisited in the film Rosa Luxemburg (1986).

A supporting actress in Coup de Grâce was Valeska Gert, a former cabaret dancer, circus performer and silent film actress who had worked with Greta Garbo and G. W. Pabst. This led to the documentary about her life, Just for Fun, Just for Play, in 1977.

Schlöndorff then contributed to the anthology film Germany in Autumn (1978), in which nine German filmmakers (including Fassbinder, Alexander Kluge, Edgar Reitz, and Böll) made short films about the hysteria and political chaos in West Germany during the German Autumn of 1977.

Schlöndorff's next film was the most successful and ambitious of his career: The Tin Drum, released in 1979. The film was based on the novel by Günter Grass, who for years had rejected proposed adaptations of his book until giving Schlöndorff his approval (and assistance) to make the film.

The Tin Drum stars David Bennent as the protagonist Oscar Matzerath, who, after receiving a tin drum on his third birthday, makes the conscious choice to stop growing and remain a three-year-old for the rest of his life. He hurls himself down a flight of stairs so as to give the adults around him a rational explanation for his handicap, and later discovers that he has the ability to tactically shatter glass with the power of his high-pitched scream, which he produces whenever anyone attempts to take his tin drum away from him. The film co-stars Angela Winkler as Oscar's mother, and Mario Adorf and Daniel Olbrychski as the German and Kashubian (Pole) who may both be his biological fathers. It mostly takes place from the end of World War I to the end of World War II (when Oscar is 20) in the city of Danzig, a Free City under League of Nations protection. It was also the site of the first battle of the war, at the Post Office, in which Oscar takes part.

The film was widely hailed as a masterpiece and shared the Palme d'or at the 1979 Cannes Film Festival with Apocalypse Now, as well as winning the 1979 Oscar for Best Foreign Language Film.

Schlöndorff collaborated with Stefan Aust, Alexander Kluge and Alexander von Eschwege on the documentary The Candidate (1980), a film about the political campaign of the CDU/CSU candidate for chancellor Franz Josef Strauss. He next made The Circle of Deceit released in 1981. Based on the novel by Nicolas Born, the film concerns the politics and moral struggles of war photographers. The film stars Bruno Ganz and Jerzy Skolimowski as photojournalists covering the Lebanon Civil War in Beirut in 1975.

=== Hollywood phase ===
Schlöndorff's first English-language film was Swann in Love (1984), an adaptation of the first two volumes of Marcel Proust's In Search of Lost Time. The film was shot in France and financed by Gaumont, and stars Jeremy Irons, Ornella Muti, Alain Delon and Fanny Ardant.

Schlöndorff then went to the United States to make a TV adaptation of Arthur Miller's Death of a Salesman, starring Dustin Hoffman as Willy Loman and John Malkovich as Biff. Both actors won Emmys for their performances and Schlöndorff was nominated for an Emmy for his direction. The film premiered on television in 1985 and was released theatrically throughout Europe over the following years.

Schlöndorff followed this with another TV movie in the US, A Gathering of Old Men, based on the novel of the same name by Ernest J. Gaines. The film stars Richard Widmark, Holly Hunter and Lou Gossett Jr. and concerns racial discrimination in 1970s Louisiana.

Schlöndorff returned to theatrical films with the Hollywood science fiction film The Handmaid's Tale (1990). The film's story takes place in a dystopian near future in which most women are sterile due to pollution. Kate (Natasha Richardson) is arrested after attempting to flee to Canada and forced to become a "Handmaid". Handmaids are fertile women who are enslaved by the state and put in the households of wealthy men – who have "ceremonial" sex with them in the hope of conceiving a child. She becomes the Handmaid of the Commander (Robert Duvall), Fred, who is married to Serena Joy (Faye Dunaway). To save herself from execution, Kate – renamed "Offred", since she now is attached to Fred's household – allows the Commander's driver (Aidan Quinn) to impregnate her and falls in love with him. The film was in competition at the 40th Berlin International Film Festival.

This was soon followed by Voyager (1991). The film stars Sam Shepard as a man who survives a plane crash, then finds the love of his life (Julie Delpy) on his next trip and begins to question the rationale of his good luck after having spent most of his life being cruel to others. The film was based on the novel Homo Faber by Max Frisch and was not a success at the box-office. He directed the concert film The Michael Nyman Songbook released in 1992.

The first of Schlöndorff's two documentaries on Austrian-born director Billy Wilder was Billy Wilder, How Did You Do It?, in which he and German critic Hellmuth Karasek interviewed Wilder about his career over the course of two weeks in 1988. It was aired on German TV in 1992, and shown on TCM in the USA under the title Billy Wilder Speaks in 2006. Schlöndorff had been a great admirer of Wilder for many years and sought his advice during the making of The Tin Drum.

Appalled at plans to destroy the historic film studios Babelsberg, Schlöndorff mounted a one-man campaign to save them in the early 1990s. He served as the chief executive for the UFA studio in Babelsberg between 1992 and 1997. During that time, he helped Jiang Wen finish editing his film In the Heat of the Sun (1994) in Germany, with the studio's full financial support. He also helped to get the film selected for the 51st Venice International Film Festival. In 1996 he contributed to the French TV series Lumière sur un massacre with the episode "Le parfait soldat".

Schlöndorff returned to Germany in to make The Ogre (1996), his most well-regarded feature film since The Tin Drum. Based on a novel by Michel Tournier and starring John Malkovich as the titular Abel Tiffauges, the film revisited many of the themes and time period of The Tin Drum. Tiffauges is a slow-witted French soldier who has been accused of child molestation. After being captured by the Nazis and put in an internment camp, he is made a servant at an elite German training camp and kidnaps local children, officially as a way to recruit them for the camp, but in his mind to protect them. The film was screened in competition at the 1996 Venice Film Festival and won the UNICEF award. The film was released in Germany in 1996 and gained positive reviews. On the audio commentary for The Tin Drum, Schlöndorff said that he had wanted to film a sequel to The Tin Drum, as the film was based only on the first two thirds of the novel. But because actor David Bennent was too old to reprise the role and he did not want to recast Oscar, he considers The Ogre to be an unofficial sequel to his masterpiece.

Schlöndorff returned to Hollywood for Palmetto (1998). In a noir plot, the film stars Woody Harrelson as a falsely accused journalist who was sent to jail after uncovering corruption in the local government. After getting out of jail and unable to find work, he encounters Rhea Malroux (Elisabeth Shue), a femme fatale who propositions him to help her extort money from her millionaire husband. The film was not a financial success and was Schlöndorff's last film in the US to date.

=== Later career ===
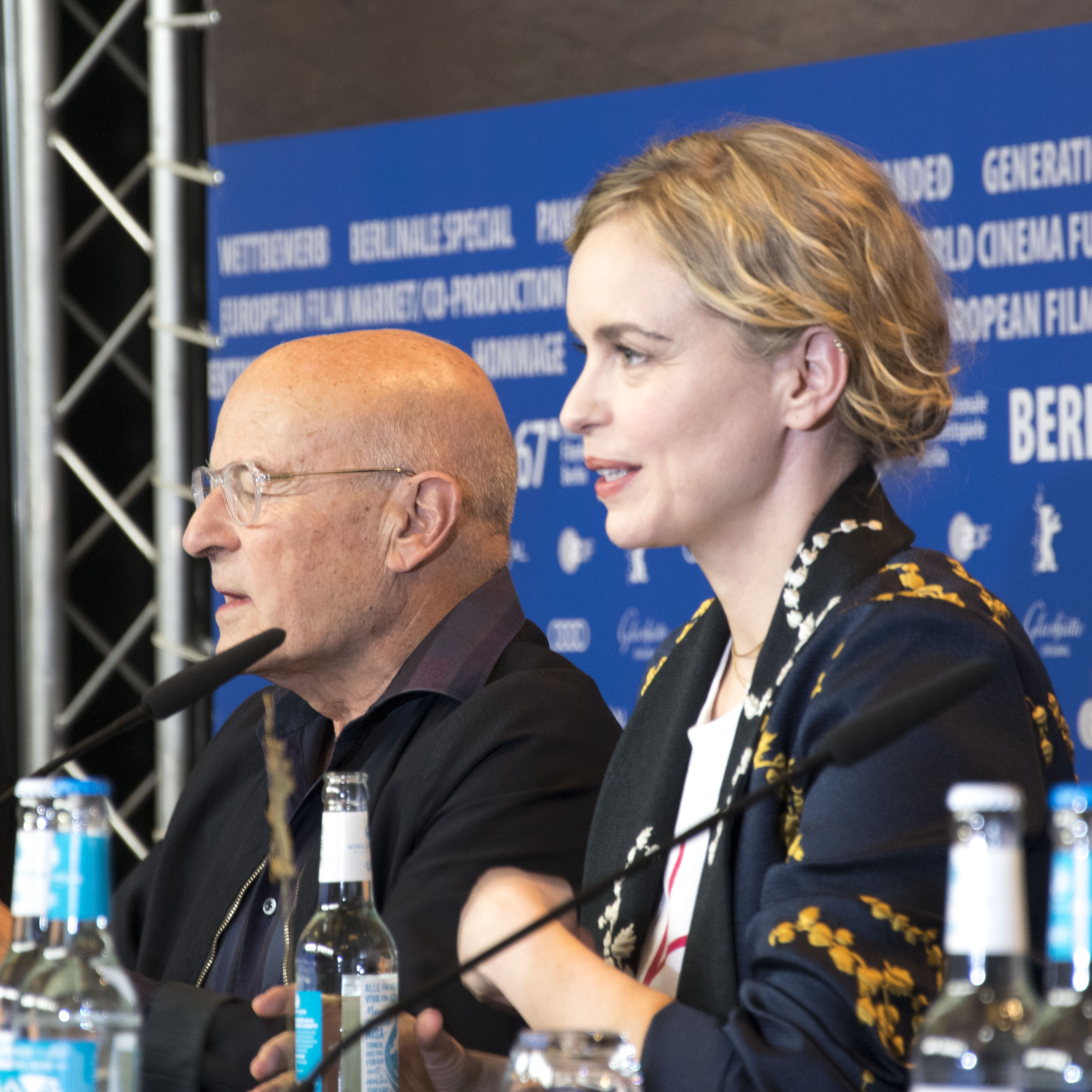
Volker Schlöndorff and Nina Hoss at the 2017 Berlin International Film Festival

Schlöndorff returned to Germany to make the film The Legend of Rita (2000). Loosely based upon the lives of members of the Red Army Faction who exiled to East Germany in the 1970s, the film centers around Rita, who most closely resembles real RAF member Inge Viett. Rita abandons the revolution and lives in East Germany under protection of the secret service, but after German reunification she faces the risk of discovery and consequences for her past crimes.

After the documentary Ein Produzent hat Seele oder er hat keine and a contribution to the omnibus film Ten Minutes Older (both in 2002), Schlöndorff made The Ninth Day (2004). The film is Schlöndorff's third film to center around World War II and is based on the diary of Father Jean Bernard. Ulrich Matthes plays Father Henri Kremer, a Catholic priest who is interned at Dachau concentration camp during the Second World War. He is inexplicably released for nine days and sent to Luxembourg. There he meets a young SS soldier who informs him that his mission there is to convince the local bishop to cooperate with the Nazi Party, in which case he will not be sent back to Dachau. He is thus faced with the moral dilemma of betraying his faith or returning to the concentration camp.

Schlöndorff next completed the TV movie Enigma: An Unacknowledged Love (2005). He returned to what was Danzig to film Strike (2006), a docudrama about labor strikes at the Gdańsk Shipyard during the Polish 1970 protests. The film is also a history of the Solidarity Movement in Poland leading up to the fall of Communism.

Schlöndorff's Ulzhan (2007) stars Philippe Torreton as a treasure hunter on his way home who has lost his soul and Ayanat Ksenbai as Ulzhan, the woman who falls in love with him. David Bennent also co-starred. In the summer of 2012, he worked with Andrew Turner, who had formerly been a runway model for the late Alexander McQueen. Schlöndorff's World War II-era film Diplomacy, dedicated to his friend Richard C. Holbrooke, debuted at the 64th Berlin International Film Festival. Set in 1944, it explores how the Swedish consul general in Paris, Raoul Nordling, helped persuade Dietrich von Choltitz, the German military governor of Paris, not to obey Hitler's orders to destroy the historic city should it fall into enemy hands.

== Other work ==
Schlöndorff has been a member of the Academy of Arts, Berlin since 1993, and is a trustee of the American Academy in Berlin. He was one of the co-founding members of the Deutsche Filmakademie in 2003.

Schlöndorff also teaches film and literature at the European Graduate School in Saas-Fee, Switzerland, where he conducts an Intensive Summer Seminar.

== Honours ==
- 1987 Hessian Cultural Prize
- 2002 Officer of the Legion of Honour
- 2003 Bavarian Order of Merit
- 2008 Order of Merit of Brandenburg
- 2009 Carl Zuckmayer Medal
- 2019 Commander's Cross of the Order of Merit of the Federal Republic of Germany

== Personal life ==
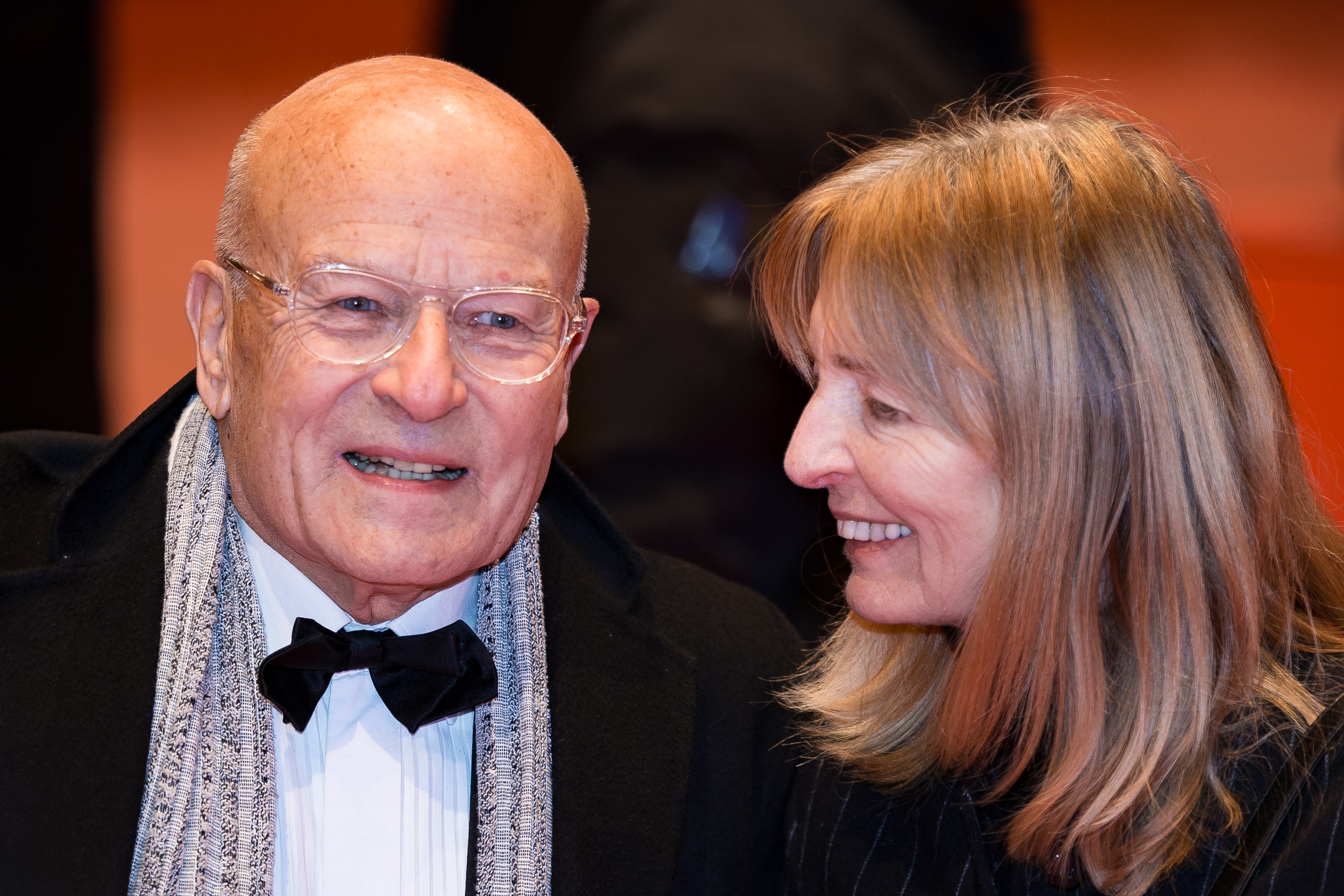
Schlöndorff with his wife Angelika in 2017

Schlöndorff was married to fellow film director Margarethe von Trotta from 1971 to 1991 and helped raise her son from her first marriage. During their marriage, he founded the production company Bioskop, which produced both his own and von Trotta's films.

In 1991, he was the Head of the Jury at the 41st Berlin International Film Festival.

Schlöndorff is currently married to Angelika Schlöndorff, the couple has one daughter.

== Filmography ==
=== Feature films ===
Year	English title	Original title	Functioned as			Notes
Year	English title	Original title	Director	Writer	Producer	Notes
1966	Young Törless	Der junge Törless	Yes	Yes	No	
1967	Degree of Murder	Mord und Totschlag	Yes	Yes	No	
1969	Man on Horseback	Michael Kohlhaas – der Rebell	Yes	Yes	No	
1971	The Sudden Wealth of the Poor People of Kombach	Der plötzliche Reichtum der armen Leute von Kombach	Yes	Yes	Yes	
1971	The Morals of Ruth Halbfass	Die Moral der Ruth Halbfass	Yes	Yes	Yes	
1972	A Free Woman	Strohfeuer	Yes	Yes	Yes	
1975	The Lost Honor of Katharina Blum	Die Verlorene Ehre der Katharina Blum oder: Wie Gewalt entstehen und wohin sie führen kann	Yes	Yes	No	Co-directed with Margarethe von Trotta
1976	Coup de Grâce	Der Fangschuss	Yes	No	Yes	
1979	The Tin Drum	Die Blechtrommel	Yes	Yes	Yes	
1981	Circle of Deceit	Die Fälschung	Yes	Yes	No	
1984	Swann in Love	Un amour de Swann	Yes	Yes	No	
1990	The Handmaid's Tale		Yes	No	No	
1991	Voyager	Homo Faber	Yes	Yes	No	
1996	The Ogre	Der Unhold	Yes	Yes	No	
1998	Palmetto		Yes	No	No	
2000	The Legend of Rita	Die Stille nach dem Schuss	Yes	Yes	No	
2004	The Ninth Day		Yes	No	No	
2006	Strike		Yes	No	No	
2007	Ulzhan		Yes	No	Yes	
2012	Calm at Sea	La mer à l'aube	Yes	Yes	No	
2014	Diplomacy	Diplomatie	Yes	Yes	No	
2017	Return to Montauk	Rückkehr nach Montauk	Yes	Yes	Yes	
2026	Visitation	Heimsuchung	Yes	Yes	Yes	

==== Producing credits ====
Year	Title	Director	Notes
1979	Beto Nervio contra el poder de las tinieblas	Miguel Bejo	Associate
1995	A French Woman	Régis Wargnier	Associate

=== Television ===
- 1970: Baal
- 1974: Stayover in Tyrol
- 1975: The Novels of Henry James (anthology series, episode "Georgina's Reasons")
- 1985: Death of a Salesman
- 1987: A Gathering of Old Men
- 1996: Lumière sur un massacre (episode "Le parfait soldat")
- 2005: Enigma: An Unacknowledged Love
- 2017: Der namenlose Tag

=== Anthologies and short films ===
- 1960: Who cares? (short)
- 1967: Der Paukenspieler (segment "Ein unheimlicher Moment")
- 1978: Germany in Autumn (segment "Die verschobene Antigone")
- 1980: The Candidate
- 1983: War and Peace
- 2002: Ein Produzent hat Seele oder er hat keine
- 2002: Ten Minutes Older: The Cello (segment "The Enlightenment")

=== Documentaries ===
- 1963: Méditerranée
- 1977: Just for Fun, Just for Play
- 1977: Portrait of Valeska Gert
- 1992: Billy, How Did You Do It?
- 1992: The Michael Nyman Songbook
- 2006: Billy Wilder Speaks (recut of Billy, How Did You Do It?)
- 2021: Der Waldmacher

== Accolades ==
Institution	Year	Category	Work	Result
Bavarian Film Awards	2005	Honorary Award	—N/a	Won
Berlin International Film Festival	1978	Golden Bear	Germany in Autumn	Nominated
Berlin International Film Festival	1978	Special Recoiintion	Germany in Autumn	Won
Berlin International Film Festival	1990	Golden Bear	The Handmaid's Tale	Nominated
Berlin International Film Festival	2000	Golden Bear	The Legend of Rita	Nominated
Berlin International Film Festival	2000	Blue Angel	The Legend of Rita	Won
Berlin International Film Festival	2017	Golden Bear	Return to Montauk	Nominated
Blue Ribbon Awards	1982	Best Foreign Film	The Tin Drum	Won
Bodil Awards	1980	Best European Film	The Tin Drum	Won
British Academy Film Awards	1985	Best Film Not in the English Language	Swann in Love	Nominated
Busan International Film Festival	2007	Honorary Award	—N/a	Won
Cairo International Film Festival	2014	International Panorama	Diplomacy	Nominated
Camerimage	2002	Special Award	—N/a	Won
Camerimage	2009	Lifetime Achievement Award	—N/a	Won
Cannes Film Festival	1966	Palme d'Or	Young Törless	Nominated
Cannes Film Festival	1966	FIPRESCI Prize	Young Törless	Won
Cannes Film Festival	1967	Palme d'Or	Degree of Murder	Nominated
Cannes Film Festival	1969	Palme d'Or	Man on Horseback	Nominated
Cannes Film Festival	1979	Palme d'Or	The Tin Drum (Note: Tied with Apocalypse Now)	Won
Cannes Film Festival	1980	Un Certain Regard	The Candidate	Nominated
Cannes Film Festival	1987	Un Certain Regard	A Gathering of Old Men	Nominated
César Awards	1980	Best Foreign Film	The Tin Drum	Nominated
César Awards	1982	Best Foreign Film	Circle of Deceit	Nominated
César Awards	2015	Best Foreign Film	Diplomacy	Won
Chicago International Film Festival	1972	Gold Hugo	A Free Woman	Nominated
Czech Film Critics' Awards	2002	World Cinematography Awared	—N/a	Won
Fajr International Film Festival	2005	Best Film	The Ninth Day	Won
Film by the Sea	2007	Lifetime Achievement Award	—N/a	Won
Film by the Sea	2017	Film and Literature Award	Return to Montauk	Nominated
German Film Awards	1966	Best Screenplay	Young Törless	Won
German Film Awards	1966	Best New Direction	Young Törless	Won
German Film Awards	1971	Best Direction	The Sudden Wealth of the Poor People of Kombach	Won
German Film Awards	1977	Best Direction	Coup de Grâce	Won
German Film Awards	1979	Best Direction	The Tin Drum	Nominated
German Film Awards	2005	Best Direction	The Ninth Day	Nominated
German Film Awards	2023	Honorary Award	—N/a	Won
Goldene Kamera	2000	Honorary Award	—N/a	Won
Grimme-Preis	2013	Fiction	Calm at Sea	Nominated
Hochi Film Awards	1981	Best Foreign Language Film	The Tin Drum	Won
Los Angeles Film Critics Association	1980	Best Foreign Language Film	The Tin Drum	Won
Kinema Junpo	1982	Best Foreign Language Film	The Tin Drum	Won
Mar del Plata International Film Festival	2005	Best Film	Calm at Sea	Nominated
Mar del Plata International Film Festival	2012	Best Film	The Ninth Day	Nominated
Monte-Carlo Television Festival	2012	Best Director - Television Film	Calm at Sea	Nominated
Montreal World Film Festival	2000	Special Grand Prize	—N/a	Won
Munich Film Festival	2004	Best Film	The Ninth Day	Won
Munich Film Festival	2004	Best Director	The Ninth Day	Won
National Board of Review	1998	International Freedom Award	—N/a	Won
Primetime Emmy Awards	1986	Outstanding Directing for a Limited Series or Movie	Death of a Salesman	Nominated
Romy Award	2018	Best TV Direction	Der namenlose Tag	Won
San Sebastián International Film Festival	1971	OCIC Award	The Sudden Wealth of the Poor People of Kombach	Won
San Sebastián International Film Festival	1975	OCIC Award	The Lost Honour of Katharina Blum	Won
Sant Jordi Awards	1980	Best Foreign Film	The Tin Drum	Won
Shanghai International Film Festival	2014	Best Film	Diplomacy	Nominated
Shanghai International Film Festival	2014	Best Screenplay	Diplomacy	Won
Silver Condor Awards	2006	Best Foreign Film	The Ninth Day	Nominated
Société des Auteurs et Compositeurs Dramatiques	2008	European Award	—N/a	Won
Telluride Film Festival	2014	Silver Medallion	—N/a	Won
Tokyo International Film Festival	1991	Tokyo Grand Prix	Voyager	Nominated
Valladolid International Film Festival	1978	Golden Spike	Germany in Autumn	Nominated
Valladolid International Film Festival	2014	Golden Spike	Diplomacy	Nominated
Valladolid International Film Festival	2014	Best Director	Diplomacy	Won
Venice Film Festival	1996	Golden Lion	The Ogre	Nominated
Venice Film Festival	1996	UNICEF Award	The Ogre	Won
Warsaw Film Festival	2022	Best Documentary Feature	Der Waldmacher	Nominated

== Cultural references ==
- Good Bye Schlöndorff, a performance by Lebanese artist and musician Waël Koudaih alias Rayess Bek based on extracts of Die Fälschung and audio tapes from the Lebanese Civil War.

== See also ==
- New German Cinema
- Cinema of Germany
