= Nancy Kovack =

American actress (born 1936)

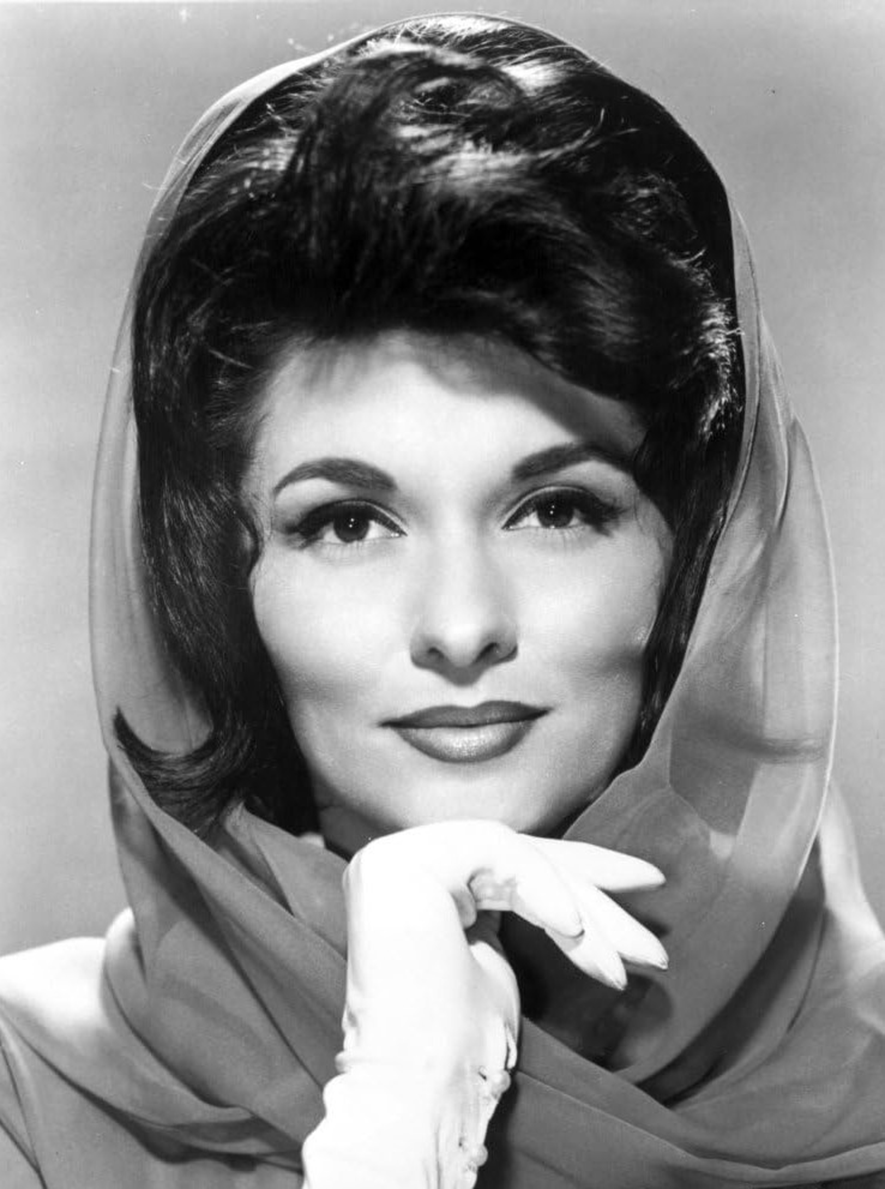
- Publicity still (1963)
- Born: Nancy Kovack; March 11, 1936 (age 90); Flint, Michigan, U.S.
- Education: University of Michigan
- Occupation: Actress
- Years active: 1958–1976
- Notable credits: Medea in Jason and the Argonauts; "Nona" in Star Trek "A Private Little War"; Emmy Award nomination as Barbara Sonderman in Mannix
- Spouse: Zubin Mehta (m. 1969)

Nancy Mehta (née Kovack; born March 11, 1936) is a retired American film and television actress.

Starting in Broadway, she gained roles in films with one of her notable early roles being the high priestess Medea in Jason and the Argonauts (1963). She continued with several film roles including in such films as Frankie and Johnny (1966) with Elvis Presley, but also appeared on many TV shows including as a femme fatale in one of the original Star Trek episodes, "A Private Little War" (1968). She was nominated for a Primetime Emmy Award for Outstanding Single Performance by an Actress in a Supporting Role for an appearance on Mannix.

== Early life ==
In 1936, Nancy Kovack was born in Flint, Michigan. Her father, Michael A. Kovack, was the manager of a General Motors plant.

With an alleged IQ of 152, Kovack graduated high school early, entering the University of Michigan at the age of 15 and graduating in 1955, when she was 19.

Kovack worked as a model and beauty queen, ultimately becoming one of the Glee Girls for Jackie Gleason and a hostess on the game show Beat the Clock.

== Acting career ==
In 1958, Kovack appeared in the original Broadway production of The Disenchanted. Kovack also starred in Hollywood film roles, such as Strangers When We Meet (1960) with Kirk Douglas and Kim Novak.

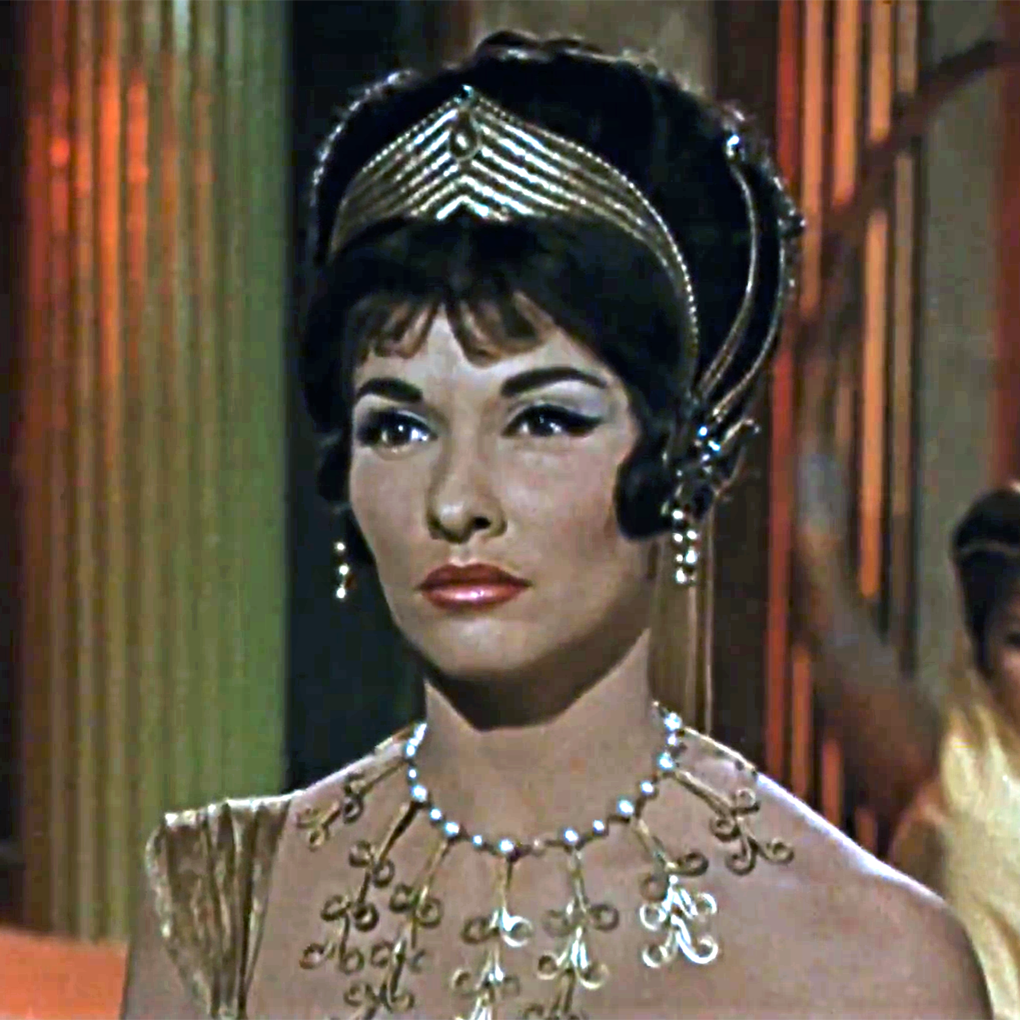
Kovack as Medea in Jason and the Argonauts (1963).

One of Kovack's most notable early film roles was as the high priestess Medea in Jason and the Argonauts (1963). Kovack also starred in other 1960s films and episodes, including Diary of a Madman (1963) with Vincent Price, The Outlaws Is Coming (1965) with The Three Stooges, Sylvia (1965) with Carroll Baker, The Great Sioux Massacre (1965), The Silencers (1966) with Dean Martin, Tarzan and the Valley of Gold (1966) with Mike Henry, Frankie and Johnny (1966) with Elvis Presley, and Carl Reiner's directorial debut, Enter Laughing (1967).

Kovack spent 2 1/2 years in Iran, and starred in three films that were made there, returning to the United States in 1968.

Kovack appeared on a number of television series including Bewitched (3 episodes, playing both Darrin Stephens' ex-girlfriend and Samantha Stephens' nemesis, Sheila Sommers and Darrin's Italian client Clio Vanita), Batman (episodes 5 and 6), I Dream of Jeannie, Get Smart, Perry Mason, 12 O'Clock High, The Man from U.N.C.L.E., The Invaders (episode "Task Force" (1967)), Burke's Law, Family Affair (episode "Family Plan" (1968)), The Name of the Game, and Hawaii Five-O (episode "Face of the Dragon" (1969)).

Kovack notably appeared in a key role as Nona, a native medicine woman and femme fatale, in one of the original Star Trek episodes, "A Private Little War" (1968).

In 1969, Kovack was nominated for an Emmy Award for Outstanding Single Performance by an Actress in a Supporting Role for an appearance in the Mannix episode Sing a Song of Murder (S7E9).

Kovack's last film role was in Marooned (1969), a science-fiction drama starring Gregory Peck and Gene Hackman. Credited as Nancy Mehta, she played the murder victim in the TV movie/series pilot Ellery Queen (also known as Too Many Suspects, 1975).

== Personal life ==
In 1969, Kovack married Indian conductor Zubin Mehta, who was music director of the Los Angeles Philharmonic and later the music director of the New York Philharmonic. Kovack left Hollywood primarily to prioritize her marriage and family. Until 2006, Kovack and Mehta spent some months of the year in residence in Munich, Germany, where Mehta was the music director of the Bavarian State Opera.

As of 1978, Kovack was reportedly a Christian Scientist.

In the early 1990s, Susan McDougal worked as Kovack's personal assistant. After her employment ended, Kovack took legal action against McDougal for alleged embezzlement. McDougal was acquitted in 1998 on all twelve charges. A suit by McDougal in 1999 for malicious prosecution ended in a settlement.

== Filmography ==
Year	Title	Role	Notes
1960	Strangers When We Meet	Marcia	
1961	Cry for Happy	Camille Cameron	
1962	The Wild Westerners	Rose Sharon	
1963	Diary of a Madman	Odette Mallotte	
1963	Jason and the Argonauts	Medea	
1964	Sylvia	Big Shirley	
1965	The Outlaws Is Coming	Annie Oakley	
1965	The Great Sioux Massacre	Libbie Custer	
1966	The Silencers	Barbara	
1966	Frankie and Johnny	Nellie Bly	
1966	Tarzan and the Valley of Gold	Sophia Renault	
1966	Diamond 33	Linda	
1967	Enter Laughing	Linda aka Mrs. B	
1967	Town's Hero		
1968	Shab-e-fereshtegan		
1969	Marooned	Teresa Stone	

== Television ==
Year	Title	Role	Notes
1958	The Verdict Is Yours	Prizefighter's Girl	Episode: "Morris vs. Dakis"
1959-1961	The United States Steel Hour	Various	3 episodes
1963	Kraft Mystery Theatre		Episode: "Talk to My Partner"
1963	Kraft Suspense Theatre	Melinda Davis	Episode: "The Name of the Game"
1963-1965	Burke's Law	Various	4 episodes
1963-1966	Perry Mason	Dina Brandt/Carla Rinaldi	2 episodes
1964	The Alfred Hitchcock Hour	Karen Osterman	Episode: "The Second Verdict"
1964	12 O’Clock High	Lt. Irene Cooper	Episode: "Appointment at Liege"
1964	Bob Hope Presents the Chrysler Theatre	Sheila DeNault	Episode: "Parties to the Crime"
1964	Voyage to the Bottom of the Sea	Monique	Episode: "Hail to the Chief"
1964–1969	Bewitched	Sheila Sommers/Clio Vanita	5 episodes
1965	Honey West	Nicole	2 episodes
1965	I Dream of Jeannie	Rita Mitchell	Episode: "The Moving Finger"
1965-1966	The Man from U.N.C.L.E.	Victoria Progue/Miss Flostone	2 episodes
1966	Batman	Queenie	Episode: "The Joker is Wild/Batman is Riled"
1966	The Wackiest Ship in the Army	Marie/Coral	Episode: "The Ghost of Lord Nelson-San"
1966-1968	The F.B.I.	Miss Grace Kagle/Ava Ritter	2 episodes
1967	I Spy	Bronwyn	Episode: "Apollo"
1967	The Invaders	June Murray	Episode: "Task Force"
1968	Star Trek: The Original Series	Nona	Episode: "A Private Little War"
1968	Family Affair	Michelle Reid	Episode: "Family Plan"
1969	Get Smart	Sonja	Episodes: "The Day They Raided the Knights"
1969	Hawaii Five-O	Dr. Alexandria Kemp	Episode: "Face of the Dragon"
1969-1973	Mannix	Barbara Sonderman	3 episodes
1971	Love, American Style	Shirley	Segment: "Love and the Rug"
1975	The Invisible Man	Carolyn Klae	Episode: "The Klae Dynasty"
1976	Cannon	Charlotte Frawley	Episode: "Blood Lines"
