= Diary of a Madman (film) =

1963 film by Reginald LeBorg

- Promotional poster
- Directed by: Reginald LeBorg
- Screenplay by: Robert E. Kent
- Based on: The Horla; 1886 story by Guy de Maupassant
- Produced by: Robert E. Kent executive Edward Small (uncredited)
- Starring: Vincent Price; Nancy Kovack; Lewis Martin
- Cinematography: Ellis W. Carter
- Edited by: Grant Whytock
- Music by: Richard LaSalle
- Production company: Robert Kent Productions/Admiral Pictures
- Distributed by: United Artists
- Release dates: March 6, 1963 (U.S.); July 12, 1963 (Finland); August 26, 1963 (Sweden)
- Running time: 96 minutes
- Country: United States
- Language: English

Diary of a Madman is a 1963 American horror film directed by Reginald LeBorg and starring Vincent Price, Nancy Kovack, and Chris Warfield.

The screenplay, written by producer Robert Kent, is an adaptation of Guy de Maupassant's short story "Le Horla" ("The Horla"), written in 1887.

== Plot ==
Following the funeral of Simon Cordier (Vincent Price), a French magistrate and amateur sculptor, his secret diary is read out by Simon's pastor friend to a group of people gathered around the table, Simon's servants, and a police captain. The diary reveals that Simon has come into contact with a malevolent entity. The invisible yet corporeal being, called a horla, is capable of limited psychokinesis and complete mind control. It is implied that Cordier's particular horla is one of a whole race of evil beings which devote themselves to driving humans insane.

Cordier first interacts with the horla when he meets a prisoner whom the entity drove to murder four people. The horla possesses the inmate and attempts to kill Cordier, who in self-defense accidentally kills the man. The magistrate inherits the prisoner's troubles as the horla turns its hauntings toward him.

As the horla begins to destroy Cordier's life, he fears he is going mad and seeks help from an alienist, who suggests that he take up a hobby. Cordier chooses to pick up his old interest in sculpture, meeting a model along the way. The model, a local woman by the name Odette Malotte, is already married. Wanting a better life, she claims to love Cordier and he pledges his love to her in turn. The horla insists the model is not the charming jewel that Cordier sees, but instead a conniving gold-digger, and compels Cordier to treat her as such. This sets up a conflict in Cordier, that he might not be the astute judge of character that his title indicates.

In an episode of insanity, Cordier murders Odette with a knife. Her decapitated body is found in the river, but her husband (not Cordier) is blamed for the crime. As his and others' lives are put in jeopardy, he becomes convinced of the horla's existence and decides drastic measures are needed to end its evil. He lures the horla into his house at night. When his presence is felt, Simon hurls an oil lamp towards the curtains, setting the house ablaze. Simon succeeds in destroying the horla, but not without sacrificing himself as the house burns in flames.

The film concludes with the people seated around the table after reading Simon's diary. Some believe Simon was mad and that the horla does not exist, others are unsure and believe that the horla might have existed. The priest's opinion is that wherever evil exists, the horla exists.

== Cast ==
- Vincent Price as Simon Cordier
- Nancy Kovack as Odette Mallotte DuClasse
- Chris Warfield as Paul DuClasse
- Elaine Devry as Jeanne D'Arville
- Ian Wolfe as Pierre, Cordier's Butler
- Stephen Roberts as Captain Robert Rennedon
- Lewis Martin as Fr. Raymonde
- Mary Adams as Louise, Cordier's Cook
- Joseph Ruskin as The Horla (voice)
- Don Brodie as Marcel the Postman

== Production ==
The movie was originally entitled The Horla, the name of the Guy de Maupassant short story on which it is based. Filming started 18 July 1962. and shooting was completed in 14 or 15 days at Admiral Pictures according to director Reginald LeBorg.

Film historian Wheeler W. Dixon praises Vincent Price's "unusually restrained" characterization of Simon Cordier. Dixon considers it superior to his "over the top" performances in producer/director Roger Corman's The Pit and the Pendulum (1961) and House of Usher (1960). LeBorg considered Price an "excellent" player who "took direction" well, but was prone to "overacting." He explained to Dixon that he used hand signals to elicit more subdued performances from Price during shooting on The Horla.

LeBorg was familiar with the Maupassant tale, and was pleased to adapt it. A dispute arose during filming between LeBorg and producer Edward "Eddie" Small (uncredited) over the quality of the disembodied voice of the evil spirit that has taken possession of Simon Cordier (Price). After testing multiple actors, Small substituted LeBorg's choice for one that had a "raspy" voice, to the director's displeasure.

LeBorg reports that he set up all the special effects Diary of a Madman, including the final sequence, in which the Horla is immolated: "[N]othing was animated. I cut out a little man and set him on fire." The movement of the paper cut-out was manipulated by piano-wire operated offscreen. At $350,000, the color film "enjoyed one of the most lavish budgets of any LeBorg film."

== Release ==
=== Home media ===
The film was released on DVD by Willette Acquisition Corp. on January 15, 2011.

== Reception ==
Critical reception for Diary of a Madman has been mixed. The New York Times gave the film a negative review, calling the film "somewhat less than eye-opening". The NYT reviewer describes the evil spirit, the Horla, as "slightly unusual [having] a voice like a toothpaste commercial and a disconcerting giggle." Nancy Kovack alone receives praise for her acting: "When Mr. Price encounters a pretty model, nicely played by Nancy Kovack, the best the horla can suggest is that he alternately sculpt and scalp her. Even the dullest male imagination should be more stimulated by Miss Kovack than that."
