= Jean Bernard (priest) =

Luxembourgish priest and writer (1907–1994)

- Born: 13 August 1907; Luxembourg City, Luxembourg
- Died: 1 September 1994 (aged 87); Luxembourg
- Occupations: Priest, journalist, memoirist

Jean Bernard (13 August 1907 – 1 September 1994) was a Catholic priest from Luxembourg who was imprisoned from May 1941 to August 1942 in the Nazi concentration camp at Dachau. He was released for nine days in February 1942 and allowed to return to Luxembourg, an episode which he later wrote about in his memoirs of the camp and which was turned into a film.

== Life ==
Born in 1907, the sixth of ten children, into the family of a Luxembourg businessman, he attended the Athénée de Luxembourg until 1925, then studied at the university of Louvain in Belgium and then studied theology and philosophy at the Catholic seminary in Luxembourg. He was awarded a doctorate in philosophy in 1933. He was ordained to the priesthood on 30 July 1933 in Luxembourg. From 1934, he headed the international Catholic film bureau (OCIC) in Brussels until it was closed down by the Gestapo in June 1940. He then became involved in helping Luxembourg families who had fled to France ahead of the German forces to return to their home country.

On 6 February 1941, he was arrested by the German Gestapo as a symbol of Luxembourg Catholic resistance to German occupation; that May he was sent to Dachau. In February 1942, he was unexpectedly released for nine days. He believed that this was part of a scheme to persuade six Luxembourgish priests to publicly voice their support for the Nazi regime. Bernard refused to cooperate, and was sent back to Dachau. He was definitively released on 5 August 1942, apparently due to the intervention by his brother with senior Nazi officials in Paris.

Until September 1944, when Luxembourg was liberated, Bernard lived in a monastery.

After the war, he served as the editor of the Luxemburger Wort, held senior positions in the Catholic Church in Luxembourg, and received many awards. From 1945 to 1946 he described his experiences in a series of articles in the Wort, under the title Dachau. Aus dem Tagebuch eines Sträflings, and later in the book Pfarrerblock 25487. The book was the basis for Volker Schlöndorff's film The Ninth Day (Der neunte Tag), released in November 2004, about his nine-day release from Dachau.

From 1947 to 1970, Bernard was president of the International Catholic Organization for Cinema and Audiovisual (OCIC, which later became SIGNIS). He had been its general secretary from 1933 to 1947. In 1955 he was appointed honorary canon of the cathedral in Luxembourg. In 1958 he retired as editor for health reasons, but continued to work at the newspaper. In 1970, Bernard was appointed an honorary prelate by Pope Paul VI. He was a member of the papal commission for film, radio and television; for the Second Vatican Council, he was a member of the working group on the press, film, radio and television, and was president of the Commission for the persecuted church, within the International Catholic Organisations Conference.

He died on 1 September 1994.

== Honours ==
- Officer of the Order of the Oak Crown
- Knight of the Order of Merit
- Knight of the Order of Leopold (Belgium)
- Stella della Solidarietà

== Works ==
=== Publications ===
- Pfarrerblock 25487. (Reprint) Luxembourg 2004. ISBN 2-87963-286-2
  - Schneider, Deborah Lucas (English translation). Priestblock 25487: A Memoir of Dachau. 2007. ISBN 978-0972598170

=== Filmography ===
- Mat Läif a Séil am Seminaire. (With Heart and Soul in the Seminary) 1932, 23 minutes.
