= Baal (film) =

1970 film

- Based on: Baal by Bertolt Brecht
- Screenplay by: Volker Schlöndorff
- Directed by: Volker Schlöndorff
- Starring: Rainer Werner Fassbinder; Sigi Graue; Margarethe von Trotta
- Music by: Klaus Doldinger
- Country of origin: West Germany
- Original language: German

Production
- Producers: Hellmut Haffner; Hans Prescher; Volker Schlöndorff
- Cinematography: Dietrich Lohmann
- Editor: Peter Ettengruber
- Running time: 87 minutes

Original release
- Release: 1970

Baal is a 1970 West German television film directed by Volker Schlöndorff. It is based on the 1923 play Baal by Bertolt Brecht. The film disappeared after Helene Weigel, Brecht's widow, saw it on television and demanded that it no longer be shown. Ethan Hawke asked Schlöndorff about seeing the film at the Cannes Film Festival, but Schlöndorff replied that he did not know where it was. Eventually the film was discovered in rusty, unmarked cans filed under S. At that point, the film was restored. It was given its first home video release by Criterion in 2018. The film did not make the 1919 play a period piece, and some of the interiors featured intentionally over-the-top colors. It was the first film Dietrich Lohmann shot in color. Margarethe von Trotta was the first actor cast. Rainer Werner Fassbinder joined for the title role after Schlöndorff's first choice was unavailable. Much of the supporting cast and crew came from Fassbinder's company, whom he did not want to be put out of work by his absence.

== Plot and themes ==
The film "explores the cult of the genius" as "an anti-heroic figure... chooses to be a social outcast and live on the fringe of bourgeois morality." In the film, "Volker Schlöndorff transposes Bertolt Brecht’s late-expressionist work to latter-day 1969", as [p]oet and anarchist Baal lives in an attic and reads his poems to cab drivers. At first feted and later rejected by bourgeois society, Baal roams through forests and along motorways, greedy for schnapps, cigarettes, women and men... After impregnating a young actress he soon comes to regard her as a millstone round his neck. He stabs a friend to death and dies alone."

== Cast ==
- Rainer Werner Fassbinder Baal
- Sigi Graue: Ekart
- Margarethe von Trotta: Sophie
- Günther Neutze: Mech
- Miriam Spoerri: Emilie
- Marian Seidowsky: Johannes
- Irmgard Paulis: Johanna
- Carla Egerer: Young Woman (as Carla Aulaulu)
- Hanna Schygulla: Luise
- Wilmut Borell: Mjurk
- Rudolf Waldemar Brem: Holzfäller
- Peer Raben
- Andrea Brüdern
- Claudia Butenuth
- Johannes Buzalski: Penner
- András Fricsay
- Michael Gempart
- Irm Hermann: Hausherrin
- Michael Grasshoff
- Günther Kaufmann: Orgauer
- Jean Launay
- Sabine von Maydell
- Eva Pampuch: Frau im roten Kleid
- Herbert Rimbach
- Christine Schuberth: Striptiseuse Savitka
- Walter Sedlmayr
- Sigi Sommer: Holzfäller
- Ulf-Jürgen Wagner
