= The Candidate (1980 film) =

1980 film

- Film poster
- Directed by: Volker Schlöndorff; Stefan Aust; Alexander Kluge; Alexander von Eschwege
- Written by: Volker Schlöndorff; Stefan Aust; Alexander Kluge; Alexander von Eschwege
- Produced by: Theo Hinz; Eberhard Junkersdorf; Alexander Kluge; Volker Schlöndorff
- Cinematography: Igor Luther; Werner Lüring; Jörg Schmidt-Reitwein; Thomas Mauch; Bodo Kessler
- Edited by: Inge Behrens; Mulle Goetz-Dickopp; Beate Mainka-Jellinghaus; Jane Seitz
- Distributed by: Bioskop Film, Filmverlag der Autoren, Kairos-Film
- Release date: 18 April 1980
- Running time: 129 minutes
- Country: West Germany
- Language: German

The Candidate (German: Der Kandidat) is a 1980 West German documentary film directed by Volker Schlöndorff, Stefan Aust, Alexander Kluge and Alexander von Eschwege. It competed in the Un Certain Regard section at the 1980 Cannes Film Festival.

== Appearances ==
- Wolf Biermann
- Karl Carstens
- Edmund Stoiber
- Franz Josef Strauß
- Marianne Strauß
