= The Horla (film) =

- Directed by: Jean-Daniel Pollet
- Release date: 1966
- Running time: 38 minutes
- Country: France
- Language: French

The Horla (also known as La Horla) is a 1966 French mystery and short film directed by Jean-Daniel Pollet and based on the short story of the same name by Guy de Maupassant.
