= The Ninth Day =

- Theatrical release poster
- Directed by: Volker Schlöndorff
- Written by: Eberhard Görner; Andreas Pflüger
- Produced by: Jürgen Haase; Wolfgang Plehn; Jean-Claude Schlim
- Starring: Ulrich Matthes; August Diehl; Bibiana Beglau
- Distributed by: Kino International
- Release date: 11 November 2004 (Germany)
- Running time: 90 minutes
- Countries: Germany; Luxembourg; Czech Republic
- Language: German

The Ninth Day is a 2004 German historical drama film directed by Volker Schlöndorff and starring Ulrich Matthes and August Diehl. It was released by Kino International.

The film is about a Catholic priest from Luxembourg who is imprisoned in Dachau concentration camp, but released for nine days. The story is based on a portion of Pfarrerblock 25487 (ISBN 2-87963-286-2), the diary of Father Jean Bernard (1907–1994), which was translated into English by Deborah Lucas Schneider as Priestblock 25487: A Memoir of Dachau (ISBN 978-0972598170).

== Synopsis ==
Abbé Henri Kremer (pseudonym used in the film for Jean Bernard) is a Roman Catholic priest from Luxembourg living under the German occupation during World War II. In February 1941, Kramer was arrested by the Germans for resistance against the German forces. Four months later, in May, Kramer was deported to the Dachau concentration camp in southern Germany, and imprisoned there in the "priest block", the section of the camp for interned priests. He experienced the horrors of the camps, including the crucifixion of some of his fellow prisoners and the German officers brutally beating and murdering prisoners. On 15 January 1942, Kremer was unexpectedly allowed to leave Dachau and return to Luxembourg for nine days. During his leave of absence in Luxembourg, Kremer was told by the German SS officers to convince his bishop to collaborate with the German officers. The SS officers told Henri Kremer that if he refused to convince his bishop to collaborate with the German officers, Kremer would be punished by being returned to the priest block of the Dachau concentration camp. Kremer returns to his native city, and is faced with a hard decision of whether he should convince the bishop to collaborate with German forces, or be returned to Dachau and experience the brutal horrors of the concentration camp for the second time. Kremer initially refuses to collaborate with German troops, and after nine days pass, Kremer is re-arrested and returned to Dachau, where he has to relive the horrors again. Kremer is finally released again from Dachau in August 1942, this time permanently, after his brother bribed the German SS high command. After his release, Kremer returns to Luxembourg, and hides in a Roman Catholic monastery until the end of the war and the liberation of Luxembourg in September 1944. After World War II ended, Henri Kremer was appointed as an honorary prelate by Pope Paul VI and goes to the Vatican City to serve the pope. After years of serving the pope in the Vatican City, Henri Kremer ultimately returns to his native Luxembourg, where he resides until his death there in Luxembourg on 1 September 1994.
