= A Free Woman (1972 film) =

1972 drama film

- Directed by: Volker Schlöndorff
- Screenplay by: Margarethe von Trotta; Volker Schlöndorff
- Starring: Margarethe von Trotta
- Cinematography: Sven Nykvist
- Edited by: Suzanne Baron
- Music by: Stanley Myers
- Release date: 1972
- Language: German

A Free Woman (German: Strohfeuer, lit. 'Straw Fire') is a 1972 West German drama film co-written and directed by Volker Schlöndorff. It premiered at the 33rd edition of the Venice Film Festival.

== Cast ==
- Margarethe von Trotta as Elisabeth Junker
- Friedhelm Ptok as Hans-Helmut Junker
- Martin Lüttge as Oskar Merz
- Georg Marischka as Schmollinger
- Walter Sedlmayr as human resources manager
- Ute Ellin as Irm
- Ruth Hellberg as Elisabeth's mother
- Konrad Farner as art historian
- Nikolaus Vesely as Nicky
