= Baal (play) =

Play by Bertolt Brecht

- First published edition
- Written by: Bertolt Brecht
- Original language: German

Premiere
- Date premiered: 8 December 1923
- Place premiered: Leipzig

Baal was the first full-length play written by the German modernist playwright Bertolt Brecht. It concerns a wastrel youth who becomes involved in several sexual affairs and at least one murder. It was written in 1918, when Brecht was a 20-year-old student at the Ludwig-Maximilians-Universität München, in response to the expressionist drama The Loner (Der Einsame) by the soon-to-become-Nazi dramatist Hanns Johst.

The play is written in a form of heightened prose and includes four songs and an introductory choral hymn ("Hymn of Baal the Great"), set to melodies composed by Brecht himself. Brecht wrote it prior to developing the dramaturgical techniques of epic theatre that characterize his later work, although he did re-work the play in 1926.

== Early productions ==
Despite being written in 1918, Baal did not receive a theatrical performance until 1923, when it opened on 8 December at the Altes Theater in Leipzig (in a production directed by Alwin Kronacher in which Brecht participated for most rehearsals).

Brecht wrote a revised version with Elisabeth Hauptmann in 1926 for a brief production at Max Reinhardt's Deutsches Theater in Berlin, where he had worked recently as a dramaturg. It opened on the 14 February for a single matinée performance. It was performed by the Junge Bühne and directed by Brecht and Oskar Homolka (who also played the title role), with set-design by Caspar Neher.

== Characters ==
- Baal - poet
- Mech - merchant and publisher
- Emilie - Mech's wife
- Dr. Piller - critic
- Johannes Schmidt
- Pschierer - director of the water rates
- A Young Man
- A Young Woman
- Johanna
- Ekart
- Luise - a waitress
- The Two Sisters
- The Landlady
- Sophie Barger
- The Tramp
- Lupu
- Mjurk
- The Nightclub Singer
- Pianist
- The Parson
- Bolleboll
- Gougou
- The Old Beggar
- Maja - the beggarwoman
- The Young Woman
- Watzmann
- A Waitress
- Two Policemen
- Drivers
- Peasants
- Woodcutters

== Plot synopsis ==
The story charts the decline of a drunken and dissolute poet, Baal, an anti-hero who rejects the conventions and trappings of bourgeois society. This situation draws on the German Sturm und Drang tradition, which celebrates the cult of the genius living outside the conventions of society that would later destroy him. "The outcast, the disillusioned tough becomes the hero; he may be criminal, he may be semi-human," argues John Willett, "but in plays like Baal he can be romanticized into an inverted idealist, blindly striking out at the society in which he lives."

Baal roams the countryside, womanizing and brawling. He seduces Johanna, who subsequently drowns herself. He spurns his pregnant mistress Sophie and abandons her. He murders his friend Ekart, becoming a fugitive from the police. Defiantly aloof from the consequences of his actions, Baal is nonetheless brought low by his debauchery, dying alone in a forest hut, hunted and deserted, and leaving in his wake the corpses of deflowered maidens and murdered friend.

== Production history ==
Baal had its British premiere on 17 February 1963 at the Phoenix Theatre, London, starring Peter O'Toole, directed by William Gaskill, and designed by Jocelyn Herbert. Circle in the Square Theatre presented the first U.S. production in May 1965 at New York's Martinique Theater, directed by Gladys Vaughan, and starring Mitchell Ryan.

Actor/film director/screenwriter Rainer Werner Fassbinder played the title role for the 1970 German TV production of Baal by Volker Schlöndorff, alongside actors Margarethe von Trotta and Günther Kaufmann.

Dutch musician Willem Breuker wrote and recorded the 14-track, 39-minute instrumental album Baal Brecht Breuker released on the BVHaast label in 1974.

Artist David Bowie played the title role for a 1982 BBC television production of Baal, by Alan Clarke. John Willett provided the English translation and screenplay. Bowie's recordings of the play's five songs were released as an EP, David Bowie in Bertolt Brecht's BAAL.

A 2011 production of Baal has also been staged at the Sydney Theater Company - receiving mixed reviews.

An adaptation by Jonathan Marc Sherman, about a dissipated rock star named "Clive", was performed at the New Group Theater Company in New York on January 17, 2013, starring Ethan Hawke, Zoe Kazan, and Vincent D'Onofrio.
