= A Private Little War =

- Star Trek: The Original Series episode
- Episode no.: Season 2 Episode 19
- Directed by: Marc Daniels
- Story by: Jud Crucis
- Teleplay by: Gene Roddenberry
- Cinematography by: Jerry Finnerman
- Production code: 045
- Original air date: February 2, 1968

Guest appearances
- Nancy Kovack – Nona; Michael Witney – Tyree; Ned Romero – Krell; Arthur Bernard – Apella; Booker Bradshaw – Dr. M'Benga; Janos Prohaska – The Mugato; Paul Baxley – Patrol Leader; Gary Pillar – Yutan; Eddie Paskey – Lt. Leslie; William Blackburn – Lt. Hadley; Roger Holloway – Lt. Lemli

Episode chronology
← Previous "The Immunity Syndrome"	Next → "Return to Tomorrow"
- Star Trek: The Original Series season 2

"A Private Little War" is the nineteenth episode of the second season of the American science fiction television series Star Trek. Written by Gene Roddenberry, based on a story by Don Ingalls (under the pseudonym Jud Crucis over frustration at Roddenberry's rewrites), and directed by Marc Daniels, it was first broadcast on February 2, 1968.

In the episode, the crew of the Enterprise discovers Klingon interference in the development of a formerly peaceful planet and joins them in what becomes an arms race as commentary on the then-current Vietnam War.

== Plot ==
The Federation starship USS Enterprise orbits the planet Neural, a primitive world that Captain Kirk has visited before. On the planet, Kirk and First Officer Spock notice a group of villagers apparently preparing an ambush. Kirk is surprised to see them with firearms, and their prey seems to be a group of Hill People, one of whom, Tyree, Kirk recognizes. Forbidden by Starfleet’s Prime Directive to use phasers, Kirk throws a rock toward the villagers, causing one of their guns to go off, which alerts the Hill People to the villagers’ presence. A chase ensues and Spock is shot.

Once back aboard the Enterprise, Spock is taken to sickbay. Sensors detect a Klingon vessel in orbit around the planet, and Kirk suspects the Klingons of having supplied the firearms to the villagers.

Kirk returns with Dr. McCoy, both in native dress, to investigate. The two are attacked by an indigenous creature called a Mugato, (Note: A horned white-furred gorilla-like creature, pronounced "mu-GAHT-u".) which bites Kirk with its venomous fangs before McCoy can kill it with his phaser. McCoy is unable to call for help, as the Enterprise has left orbit to avoid detection by the Klingons.

A friendly group of Hill People arrive and take Kirk and McCoy to their camp, where Kirk discovers that his friend Tyree is now their leader. Tyree is married to Nona, a Kahn-ut-tu woman who can cure the mugato bite. Nona has been urging Tyree to acquire firearms for their tribe.

On hearing of Kirk's arrival, Nona enters the cave and spies McCoy using his phaser to heat rocks. Nona is intrigued and quizzes Tyree about the mysterious guests. She then proceeds to treat Kirk, pressing a mahko root into his injury with her hand which was cut with a knife just before the ritual began. At the conclusion of the ritual she claims that Kirk is now hers, and Tyree explains that, according to legend, he will be unable to refuse her anything as a result of the treatment. The injuries to Kirk and her hand are shown to be completely healed.

When Kirk recovers, he asks Tyree about the villagers' weapons. Tyree says he saw them for the first time a year ago and believed the villagers were making them. Kirk and McCoy decide to reconnoiter the village that night. Once there, they locate a forge in which they find a chrome steel drill and virtually carbon-free iron, evidence of outsiders' involvement. Soon a Klingon appears with the village leader, who discuss the manufacture of improved weapons. Kirk and McCoy surprise and overpower them, taking a flintlock weapon and escaping with Tyree's help.

The next day, Kirk shows the Hill People how to use the weapon, but Tyree refuses to handle it. McCoy protests, but Kirk counters that both warring parties must be put on an equal footing if both are to survive.

Nona tries to seduce Kirk with the help of local herbs. A mugato attacks Nona, and Kirk disintegrates it with his phaser. Nona then knocks Kirk unconscious, flees with the phaser, and coming upon a group of villagers, offers them the weapon. Not believing her story, they assault her. When Kirk, McCoy, and Tyree appear, the villagers believe she has led them into a trap, and kill her. The two groups fight and the villagers run away.

Tyree now demands more "fire stick" weapons to avenge his wife's death. Kirk reluctantly orders Scott to manufacture and beam down a hundred flintlocks for the tribesmen. Scott questions the unusual order, and Kirk answers, "A hundred ... Serpents for the Garden of Eden."

== Production and reception ==
This episode has been analyzed as an allegory for the United States' involvement in the Vietnam War, in both the 1997 book, Inside Star Trek: The Real Story, and a 2016 The New Yorker article.

Don Ingalls' first draft of the script had specific references to the Vietnam War, such as Mongolian-type clothes and a character described as a "Ho Chi Minh" type. Other early ideas included Kirk's friendship with Tyree developing completely during Kirk's second visit to the planet and a personal conflict between Kirk and Krell the Klingon. Eugene Myers and Torie Atkinson of Tor.com argue that the episode is sexist in its presentation of Nona, and that the episode, in trying too hard to be an allegory for the war in Vietnam, fails to find a peaceful, Star Trek, solution to the problem.

The episode credit title shows "Gumato" as this was the creature's original name.

In 2017, Den of Geek ranked Mugato the 43rd best aliens of the Star Trek franchise.

In 2017, Inverse recommended "A Private Little War" as "essential watching" for Star Trek: Discovery.

In 2018, Collider ranked this episode the 14th best original series episode.

In September 2021, the Mugato is featured in 'Mugato, Gumato', the fourth episode of the second season of Star Trek: Lower Decks.

== Notes ==
The Mugato was originally named The Gumato and is shown as such in episode credit. It was renamed due to DeForest Kelley having difficulty pronouncing it.
