= The Sudden Wealth of the Poor People of Kombach =

- German: Der plötzliche Reichtum der armen Leute von Kombach
- Directed by: Volker Schlöndorff
- Written by: Volker Schlöndorff; Margarethe von Trotta
- Produced by: Volker Schlöndorff
- Cinematography: Franz Rath
- Edited by: Claus von Boro
- Music by: Klaus Doldinger
- Release date: 1971
- Running time: 104 minutes
- Country: West Germany
- Language: German

The Sudden Wealth of the Poor People of Kombach (German: Der plötzliche Reichtum der armen Leute von Kombach) is a film d'auteur from 1971 directed by Volker Schlöndorff. He also co-wrote the script with Margarethe von Trotta. The film was based on a true event that occurred in the Hessian Hinterland in the 19th century.

== Plot ==
On 19 May 1822, eight poor farmers and day laborers from Kombach in the Hessian Hinterland succeed in robbing a money transport that runs from Gladenbach to Gießen every month. Their good fortune, however, does not last, as their sudden wealth is soon treated with suspicion.

== Cast ==
- Georg Lehn as Hans Jacob Geiz
- Reinhard Hauff as Heinrich Geiz
- Karl-Joseph Cramer as Jacob Geiz
- Wolfgang Bächler as David Briel
- Harald Müller as Johann Soldan
- Margarethe von Trotta as Sophie
- Joe Hembus as Writer
- Walter Buschhoff as Driver
- Maria Donnerstag as Frau Geiz
- Angelika Hillebrecht as Johanna Soldan
- Harry Owen as Ludwig Acker
- Wilhelm Grasshoff as Richter Danz
- Eva Pampuch as Gänseliesel
- Rainer Werner Fassbinder: Farmer
- Karl-Heinz Merz as Landschütz Volk

== Background ==
The film is based on the Mail Robbery of Subach (de). Schlöndorff, who grew up in Wiesbaden, used many references to his childhood in Hesse, including shooting at difference locations in Hesse, using Hessian actors, and referencing Hessian authors.

== Awards ==
1971: Deutscher Filmpreis - Best Direction

1971: San Sebastián International Film Festival - OCIC Award
