= Ulrich Matthes =

German actor

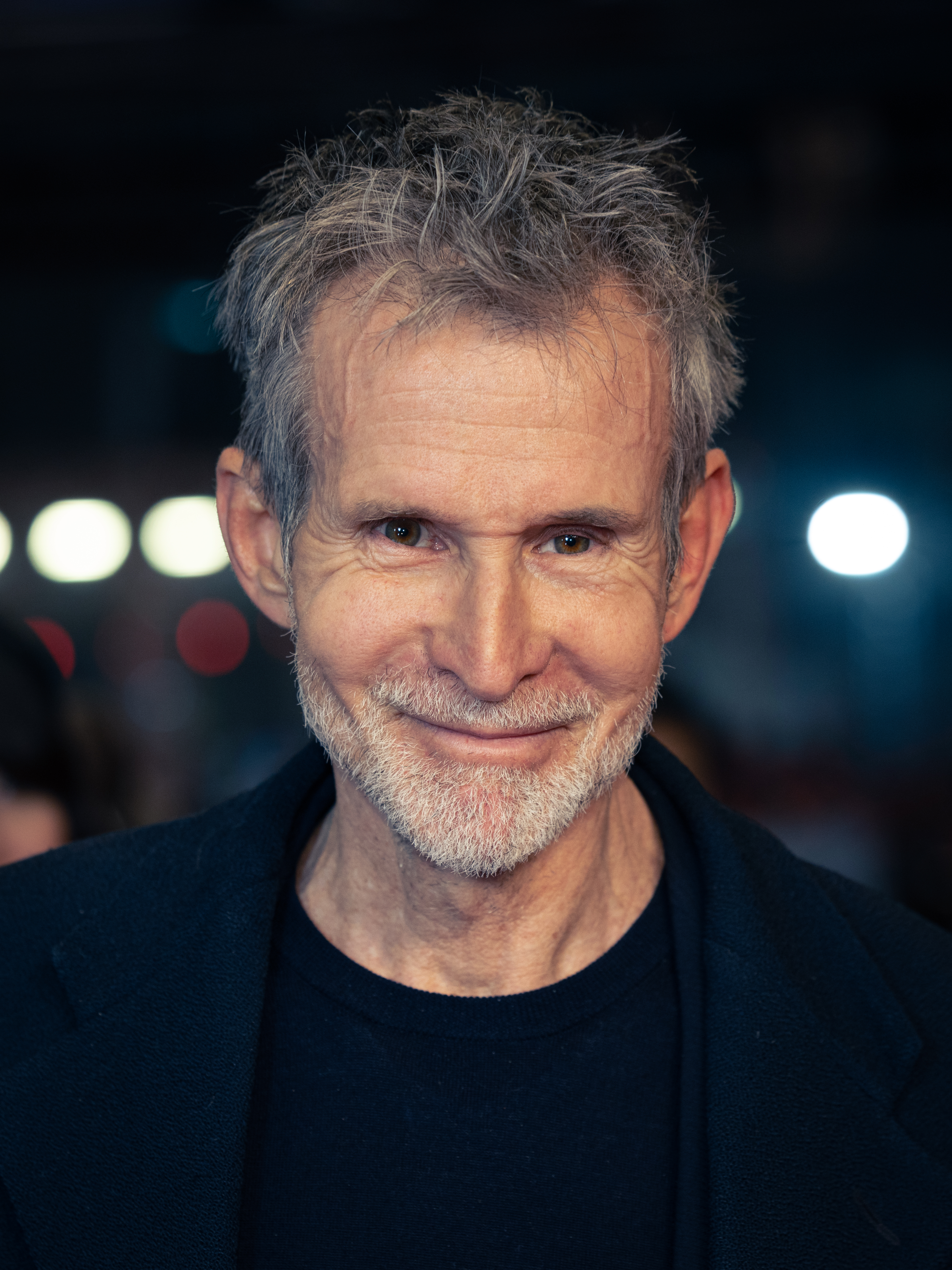
- Matthes in 2025
- Born: 9 May 1959 (age 67); West Berlin, West Germany
- Occupations: Actor; voice actor
- Years active: 1969–present
- Notable work: Downfall, The Ninth Day

Ulrich Matthes (born 9 May 1959) is a German actor. He is best known for having played Joseph Goebbels in the 2004 film Downfall.

== Life and work ==
Matthes was born in West Berlin and educated at the Evangelisches Gymnasium zum Grauen Kloster. He studied acting in the early 1980s in Berlin under Else Bongers. In the 2004 movie Downfall he plays Joseph Goebbels. In the 2004 movie The Ninth Day, he plays Fr. Henri Kremer, a Catholic priest imprisoned at Dachau. He is also the standard German voice for Kenneth Branagh along with Martin Umbach.

In 2019, Matthes served on the jury that chose Pauline Curnier Jardin as winner of the Preis der Nationalgalerie.

== Awards ==
- 1985: Förderpreis für Literatur der Landeshauptstadt Düsseldorf in Northrhine-Westphalia
- 1999: Bavarian Film Award – Best Actor for performance in Rider of the Flames
- 2003: Deutscher Hörbuchpreis
- 2007: Theaterpreis Berlin
- 2008: Deutscher Theaterpreis Der Faust
- 2015: Goldene Kamera – Best German Actor for performances in the Tatort episode Im Schmerz geboren (“Born in pain”) and in Bornholmer Straße (“Bornholm street”)
- 2015: Grimme-Preis – Best Actor for performance in Tatort: Im Schmerz geboren
- 2015: German Television Academy Award – Best Actor for performance in Bornholmer Straße
- 2016: Lielais Kristaps – Best Actor for performance in Pelnu Sanatorija (Exiled)
- 2022 Officer's Cross of the Order of Merit of the Federal Republic of Germany

== Film ==
- 1969: An einem Tag im September (Short) – Max
- 1970: Die Wesenacks (TV film) – Fränzchen
- 1973: Artur, Peter und der Eskimo (TV film) – Peter
- 1989: Henry V – Henry V (German version)
- 1992: Herr Ober! – TV game show host
- 1994: Mary Shelley's Frankenstein – Victor Frankenstein (German version)
- 1995: Ein falscher Schritt (TV film) – Georg Klein
- 1995: Der Mörder und sein Kind (TV film) – Rainer Dreyer
- 1995: Nikolaikirche (TV film) – Alexander ‘Sascha’ Bacher
- 1995: Othello – Iago (German version)
- 1996: Hamlet – Prince Hamlet (German version)
- 1997: Death Game (TV film) – Jan-Carl Raspe
- 1997: Winter Sleepers – Rene
- 1998: Abgehauen (TV film) – Eberhard E.
- 1998: Rider of the Flames – Baron Isaac von Sinclair
- 1999: Aimée & Jaguar – Eckert (SS)
- 1999: Framed (Short) – Beck
- 2000: The Coq Is Dead (TV film) – Kommissar Steiner
- 2002: Mörderherz (TV film) – Dr. Graf
- 2004: Traffic Affairs – Peter
- 2004: The Ninth Day – Abbé Henri Kremer
- 2004: Downfall – Joseph Goebbels
- 2006: Wer war Kafka? (Documentary) (voice)
- 2006: Vineta – Dr. Leonhard
- 2008: November Child – Robert von der Mühlen
- 2010: Neue Vahr Süd (TV film) – Hauptmann
- 2011: Cracks in the Shell – Ben Kästner
- 2011: Calm at Sea (TV film) – Ernst Jünger
- 2012: A Little Suicide (Short) – The Cockroach (voice)
- 2012: Kunduz: The Incident at Hadji Ghafur – Grewe
- 2013: The Notebook – Apa
- 2014: Open the Wall (TV film) – Hartmut Kummer
- 2016: Pelnu Sanitorija (Exiled) (Latvian film) – Ulrihs
- 2016: Geschichte einer Liebe – Freya – Helmuth James von Moltke
- 2016: Die Vierte Gewalt (TV film) – Publisher
- 2017: Gift (TV film) – Matteo Kälin
- 2017: Krieg (TV film) – Arnold
- 2017: Die Puppenspieler (TV film) – Rodrigo Borgia
- 2019: A Hidden Life – Lorenz Schwaninger
- 2021: The Story of My Wife – the psychiatrist
- 2022: Munich - The Edge of War – Adolf Hitler

== Television ==
- 1995: Wolffs Revier: Sommersprossen – Danzer
- 1987–1997: Derrick (4 episodes) – Harald Breuer / Robert Lohmann / Holger Küster / Ulrich Huberti
- 1997: The Old Fox: Der Tod der Eltern – Andreas Gobel
- 1997–1999: Polizeiruf 110 (2 episodes) – Psychologe / Tanjas Partner
- 2000: Ein Fall für zwei: Blutiges Pfand – Michael Strobel
- 2008: The Bill: Proof of Life – Victor Hauptmann (crossover story with Leipzig Homicide)
- 2011: Tatort: Stille Wasser – Günther Kremer
- 2014: Tatort: Im Schmerz geboren – Richard Harloff
- 2019: Sarah Kohr: Das verschwundene Mädchen – Artem Lasarew
- 2020: Das Boot

== Personal life ==
In February 2021, Matthes came out as gay.

In April 2023, Matthes was one of the 22 guests at the ceremony in which former Chancellor Angela Merkel was decorated with the Grand Cross of the Order of Merit for special achievement by President Frank-Walter Steinmeier at Schloss Bellevue in Berlin.
