= Jean-Daniel Pollet =

Jean-Daniel Pollet (French: [ʒɑ̃ danjɛl pɔlɛ]; 1936–2004) was a French film director and screenwriter who was most active in the 1960s and 1970s. He was associated with two approaches to filmmaking: comedies which blended burlesque and melancholic elements, and poetic films based on texts by writers such as the French poet Francis Ponge.

== Career ==
Pollet was born on 20 June 1936 in La Madeleine, Nord, in France. His film career started in 1958, when he did a short film set in Paris called Pourvu qu'on ait l'ivresse..., in which Pollet filmed the movements of dancers' silhouettes. Pollet built on the images and themes from this first film in many of his later works, by incorporating elements of popular comedies imbued with both burlesque and melancholic elements. In the early 1960s, Pollet began exploring another approach to filmmaking with the film Méditerranée, which he made over two years with Volker Schlöndorff. Pollet tried to create a form of poetic film, using texts and commentaries by writers such as Philippe Sollers, Jean Thibeaudeau, and Francis Ponge.

In the 1990s, he was paralyzed after a train accident, and so he filmed his last movies in the areas around his house in the French town of Cadenet. In 2004, when Pollet realized that his death was approaching, he wrote his last screenplay, Jour après jour, which was finished by Jean-Paul Fargier. Pollet died at the age of 68 on 9 September 2004 at Cadenet, Vaucluse, in France.

== Filmography ==
- 1958: Pourvu qu'on ait l'ivresse...
- 1960: Line of Sight
- 1961: Gala
- 1963: Méditerranée
- 1964: Bassae
- 1965: Une balle au cœur
- 1965: Paris vu par... (segment Rue Saint-Denis)
- 1966: Les Morutiers
- 1966: Le Horla
- 1967: Tu imagines Robinson
- 1970: Le Maître du temps
- 1971: Le Sang
- 1971: L'Amour c'est gai, l'amour c'est triste
- 1973: L'Ordre
- 1976: L'Acrobate
- 1978: Pour mémoire (La forge)
- 1986: Au Père Lachaise
- 1988: Contretemps
- 1991: Trois jours en Grèce
- 1994: Dieu sait quoi
- 2001: Ceux d'en face
- 2006: Jour après jour, terminé par Jean-Paul Fargier
