= Méditerranée (film) =

Méditerranée (French pronunciation: [meditɛʁane]) is a 1963 French experimental film directed by Jean-Daniel Pollet with assistance from Volker Schlöndorff. It was written by Philippe Sollers and produced by Barbet Schroeder, with music by Antoine Duhamel. The 45 minute film is cited as one of Pollet's most influential films, which according to Jonathan Rosenbaum directly influenced Jean-Luc Godard's Contempt, released later the same year. Footage for the film was shot around the Mediterranean, including at a Greek temple, a Sicilian garden, the sea, and also features a fisherman, a bullfighter, and a girl on an operating table.
