= Lucas Lynggaard Tønnesen =

Danish actor (born 2000)

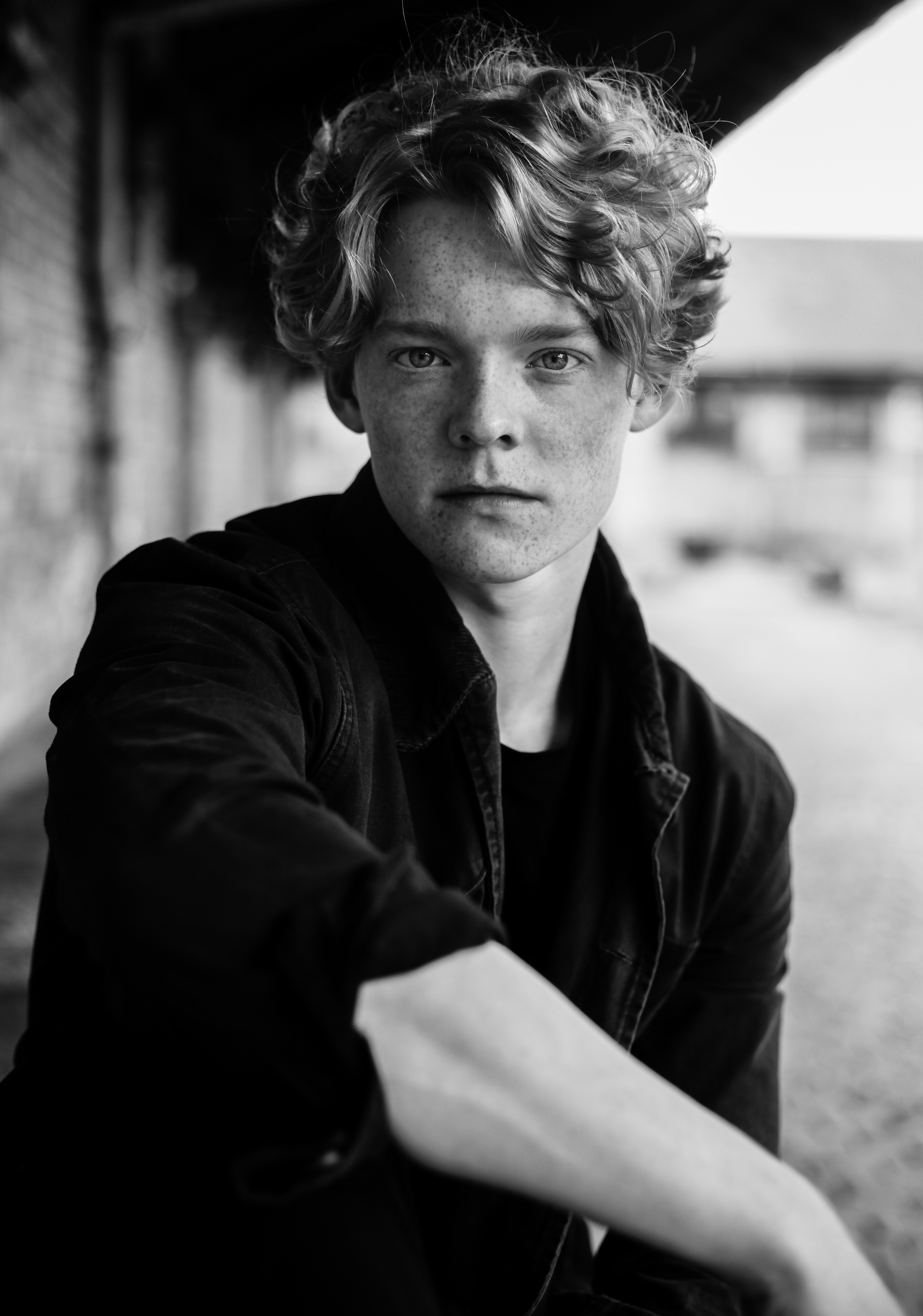
- Tønnesen in 2018
- Born: 13 July 2000 (age 26); Copenhagen, Denmark
- Other name: Lucas Tønnesen
- Occupation: Actor
- Years active: 2012–present
- Known for: The Rain
- Height: 182 cm (6 ft 0 in)

Lucas Lynggaard Tønnesen (born 13 July 2000) is a Danish actor. He is best known for his roles in the Netflix series The Rain and Borgen – Power & Glory. In 2022, Tønnesen starred in the Netflix multilingual mystery-science fiction series 1899.

== Early life ==
Lucas Lynggaard Tønnesen was born in Copenhagen, Denmark. He has a younger sister, who is an acrobat. At the age of nine, he enrolled in a singing school in Copenhagen, joining a choir and travelling the world. In the summer of 2012, his father sent a recording of him singing to an audition, which landed Tønnesen the leading role in a theatre play called Cirkus Summarum. Following this, Tønnesen expressed a deep interest in acting.

== Career ==
Tønnesen began his career in film in the Danish comedy Player. He went on to appear in the film The Keeper of Lost Causes.

In 2014, he made his way into television by playing a regular role in the Danish series Tidsrejsen. In 2015, he starred as Oliver in the short film I Stykker. He resumed his foray into acting in 2018, taking on the role of Rasmus Andersen in the first Netflix Danish series, The Rain at the age of sixteen. The series ran for three seasons, until 2020.

Tønnesen went on to star in multiple short films in subsequent years. In 2022, he took on a recurring role in a Netflix co-production series, Borgen – Power & Glory, as Magnus Nyborg Christensen. He later starred in the multilingual Netflix mystery-horror series 1899, created by Baran bo Odar and Jantje Friese.

=== Other ventures ===
In 2020, Tønnesen became an ambassador for Emporio Armani in the EA Building Dialogues Fashion Show in Milan. He personally met Giorgio Armani at that time.

== Filmography ==
=== Film ===
List of film appearances, with year, title, and role shown
Year	Title	Role	Notes	Ref.
2013	Player	Phillip		
2013	The Keeper of Lost Causes	Young Lasse		
2015	I Stykker	Oliver	Short film	
2019	Sail On, My Love	Villiam	Short film	
2023	Paradise	Dr. Falter Berg		
2026	The Weight	Olson		
TBA	Pumping Black		Filming	

=== Television ===
List of television appearances, with year, title, and role shown
Year	Title	Role	Notes	Ref.
2014	Tidsrejsen	Oliver		
2018–2020	The Rain	Rasmus Andersen	Main role; 3 seasons	
2022	Borgen – Power & Glory	Magnus Nyborg Christensen	Recurring role	
2022	1899	Krester	Main role	

=== Theatre ===
Year	Title	Role	Notes	Ref.
2012	Cirkus Summarum	Buster	Main role	
