= 1899 (TV series) =

2022 German mystery science fiction television series

- Promotional poster
- Genre: Period drama; Mystery; Supernatural horror; Science fiction
- Created by: Jantje Friese; Baran bo Odar
- Written by: Jantje Friese; Dario Madrona López Gallego; Emma Ko; Jerome Bucchan-Nelson; Juliana Lima Dehne; Emil Nygaard Albertsen
- Directed by: Baran bo Odar
- Starring: Emily Beecham; Aneurin Barnard; Andreas Pietschmann; Miguel Bernardeau; José Pimentão; Isabella Wei; Gabby Wong; Yann Gael; Mathilde Ollivier; Jonas Bloquet; Rosalie Craig; Maciej Musiał; Clara Rosager; Lucas Lynggaard Tønnesen; Maria Erwolter; Alexandre Willaume; Tino Mewes; Isaak Dentler; Fflyn Edwards; Anton Lesser
- Theme music composer: Grace Slick
- Opening theme: "White Rabbit" by Eliot Sumner
- Composer: Ben Frost
- Country of origin: Germany
- Original languages: English; Spanish; French; Polish; German; Danish; Portuguese; Cantonese
- No. of seasons: 1
- No. of episodes: 8

Production
- Executive producers: Jantje Friese; Baran bo Odar; Philipp Klausing
- Producer: Pat Tookey-Dickson
- Production locations: Germany; United Kingdom
- Cinematography: Nikolaus Summerer
- Running time: 50–62 minutes
- Production company: Dark Ways

Original release
- Network: Netflix
- Release: November 17, 2022

1899 is a multilingual German mystery science fiction television series created by Jantje Friese and Baran bo Odar. It premiered on Netflix in November 2022 and received generally favourable reviews. The series was cancelled in January 2023.

== Premise ==
Set in 1899, the series follows the diverse and secretive passengers of the steamship Kerberos travelling from Southampton in the UK to start new lives in New York City, when they encounter the mysteriously empty ship Prometheus which had been lost at sea four months prior.

== Cast and characters ==
=== Main ===
- Emily Beecham as Maura Henriette Franklin/Singleton, a neurologist and one of the first female doctors in Britain, travelling alone to America
- Aneurin Barnard as Daniel Solace, a mysterious man who boards the Kerberos while alongside the Prometheus
- Andreas Pietschmann as Eyk Larsen, the ship's captain, whose wife and three children died in a fire
- Miguel Bernardeau as Ángel, a wealthy Spaniard traveling with Ramiro
- José Pimentão as Ramiro, a Portuguese servant traveling with Ángel under the cover of being a Spanish priest
- Isabella Wei as Ling Yi, a mysterious young woman from Hong Kong, pretending to be a Japanese geisha and traveling with Yuk Je
- Gabby Wong as Yuk Je, a middle-aged woman from Hong Kong and Ling Yi's mother
- Yann Gael as Jérôme, a French stowaway
- Mathilde Ollivier as Clémence, a young woman from the Paris elite, accompanied by her new husband Lucien
- Jonas Bloquet as Lucien, an upper class Parisian, and former Lieutenant of the French Foreign Legion, newly married to his wife Clémence
- Rosalie Craig as Virginia Wilson, a sociable, wealthy British woman
- Maciej Musiał as Olek, a Polish stoker on his way to New York
- Clara Rosager as Tove, a young pregnant Danish woman traveling to New York City with her family
- Lucas Lynggaard Tønnesen as Krester, a young Danish man with a mysterious scar on his face
- Maria Erwolter as Iben, a religious Dane traveling with her husband Anker and children, who supposedly hears the voice of God
- Alexandre Willaume as Anker, a religious Dane going to New York with his wife Iben, his son Krester, and his daughters Tove and Ada
- Tino Mewes as Sebastian, the first mate on the Kerberos
- Isaak Dentler as Franz, the captain's right-hand man
- Fflyn Edwards as Elliot, a.k.a. "the boy", a mysterious mute boy found under unusual circumstances, who becomes Maura's charge on board the Kerberos.
- Anton Lesser as Henry Singleton, a British investor and Maura's father

=== Recurring ===
- Vida Sjørslev as Ada, Krester and Tove's younger sister
- Alexander Owen as Landon, a stoker and friend of Darrel
- Ben Ashenden as Darrel, a stoker and friend of Landon
- Richard Hope as Dr. Reginald Murray, a boorish British doctor
- Joshua Jaco Seelenbinder as Eugen, an officer on the Kerberos
- Niklas Maienschein as Wilhelm, the telegraph operator on the Kerberos
- Jónas Alfreð Birkisson as Einar, a third class passenger from Norway and mutineer
- Heidi Toini as Bente, a third class passenger

=== Guest ===
- Cloé Heinrich as Nina Larsen, Eyk's daughter
- Alexandra Gottschlich as Sara Larsen, Eyk's wife
- Kaja Chan as Mei Mei, Ling Yi's friend in Hong Kong
- Martin Greis as Villads, the landowner that employed Anker's family

== Episodes ==
No.	Title	Directed by	Written by	Original release date
1	"The Ship"	Baran bo Odar	Jantje Friese	November 17, 2022
On 19 October 1899, the steamship Kerberos is sailing from England to New York City. Four months earlier, its sister ship Prometheus disappeared without a trace on the same route. Maura and many of the first-class passengers on Kerberos are in the dining room when third-class passenger Krester bursts in pleading for a doctor. Krester is thrown out by Franz, but Maura follows Krester down into third-class, where she resolves Tove's tangled umbilical cord. Lucien and Clémence struggle with intimacy. Maura has strange visions. She encounters the captain of the Kerberos, Eyk, who warns her to follow the ship's rules. After receiving a message consisting of only a set of coordinates, presumably from the Prometheus, Eyk changes course of the Kerberos to those coordinates, to the chagrin of many passengers. Kerberos sights the Prometheus, which appears to be abandoned. Eyk boards Prometheus with Maura, Ramiro, Olek and Jérôme. Ángel takes an interest in Krester. A mysterious man boards Kerberos and moves into the room next to Maura's. On Prometheus, Eyk finds a strange hairband, and discovers that the telegraph is destroyed. Maura follows a scarab beetle to a cabinet and opens it to find a boy, who hands her a mysterious black tetrahedron.
2	"The Boy"	Baran bo Odar	Jantje Friese & Dario Madrona López Gallego	November 17, 2022
Eyk receives a message from the shipping company reading only two words: "Sink ship". Maura houses the boy, the only person discovered on Prometheus, in her room. She discovers a ring in his possession, and a symbol of an upside-down triangle with a horizontal line behind his left ear. The mysterious man introduces himself to Maura as Daniel. Ángel gives Krester a cigarette tin. Jérôme breaks into Lucien and Clémence's room and leaves a Legion of Honour medal. Eyk has hallucinations of his wife and daughters, who died in a house fire some years ago; one of his daughters wears the same hairband found on Prometheus. He wakes up to find a shaft has appeared under the bed in his room. Tove finds the cigarette tin and angrily returns it to Ángel; Ángel and Ramiro have an argument which leads to them having sex. Jérôme is discovered to be a stowaway and subdued. Maura shows the boy a letter bearing the same triangle symbol which led her to board the ship, but he remains mute. Eyk decides to tow Prometheus back to Europe, to the growing displeasure of many passengers and crew. Eyk shows Maura a similar letter that led him to Kerberos, and he believes answers lie with the Prometheus. Ada is found dead. Elsewhere, someone is monitoring the ship's occupants on screens.
3	"The Fog"	Baran bo Odar	Jantje Friese & Emma Ko	November 17, 2022
Ada's cause of death cannot be determined. After Kerberos runs into heavy fog, Eyk orders the ship to stop until the fog clears. Eyk shows Maura the hairband and the shaft in his room. The two head back to Prometheus to find its logbook. First mate Sebastian uncovers a panel and inputs a sequence made of triangles. While hiding from her mother after an argument about her training to be a geisha, Ling Yi has flashbacks of her friend's accidental death which led to her boarding Kerberos. Olek finds Ling Yi and comforts her. Disobeying Eyk's orders to keep Ada's death secret, Franz lets Tove retrieve her body. Krester gives Ángel a handjob. Daniel enters Maura's room and meets with the boy. On the Prometheus, Eyk and Maura find another shaft bearing the triangle symbol, which is also the ship company's logo. More bodies are found on the Kerberos. Eyk finds a document in Prometheus's furnaces which he hides from Maura. Ling Yi entertains Lucien, though he has a seizure after an interruption by Clémence earlier prevented him from taking medication. Furious with Eyk's decision to return to Europe and hide Ada's death, Franz arms the third-class passengers and urges them to launch a mutiny. Olek attempts to warn Eyk but is beaten and locked up with Jérôme. Ramiro warns Eyk, but both are arrested by mutineers led by Tove. Daniel uses a device resembling a sliding puzzle to teleport the Kerberos.
4	"The Fight"	Baran bo Odar	Jantje Friese & Jerome Bucchan-Nelson	November 17, 2022
The mutineers sail the Kerberos westward. Franz forces Jérôme and Olek to throw the bodies overboard. Sebastian convinces Iben the boy is to blame for the deaths, and she takes command of the mutineers and orders a search. Lucien finds the medal and attacks Clémence, only to apologize and leave. Eyk and Ramiro escape captivity. Iben leads a search of Maura's room, but the boy has disappeared. Maura discovers a shaft appearing under her bed with the boy hiding in it. The boy uses a beetle to lead Maura to a safe path across the ship. Olek stages a distraction, allowing Jérôme to escape. Krester spits in Ángel's face in front of Iben, but she tells him she wishes God had taken him rather than Ada. Jérôme encounters Clémence and the two find Eyk and Ramiro, later joined by Maura and the boy. The six attempt to launch a lifeboat, but are found by the mutineers. The boy surrenders himself, but Jérôme tries to intervene and is shot. Jérôme has flashbacks of his time in the French Foreign Legion alongside Lucien. When Lucien's suggestion to desert was rejected by Jérôme, he locked Jérôme in a cell, stole the uniform of a dead officer, and left the medal with Jérôme. Back on Kerberos, Eyk and Jérôme rally loyalists opposed to the mutineers. The two sides clash, but Iben throws the boy overboard before Maura can reach him. Eyk sounds a retreat. He confronts Maura with the document, which lists her as a passenger on the Prometheus. The boy reappears on the Kerberos to shocked loyalists.
5	"The Calling"	Baran bo Odar	Jantje Friese & Juliana Lima Dehne	November 17, 2022
Disgusted by Iben and Krester's actions, Tove defects to the loyalists. Frightened of the boy, the loyalists lock him in a cabinet. Maura is shot at while trying to free him, but time suddenly freezes, and the boy leads her away. When time resumes, a mysterious ticking noise causes most of the ship's passengers, including Yuk Je and Krester, to enter a marching trance and throw themselves overboard. The boy writes Maura a cryptic note that "they" are listening, and whispers to her that if she wants answers, she needs to "ask the Creator". Using a beetle to reveal a passage in the shaft, the boy takes Maura to an abandoned mental asylum. Daniel follows and promises the boy "he" wouldn't find him. The Kerberos receives a second "sink ship" message. Exploring the asylum, Maura encounters Henry. She asks him about her long-lost brother, Ciaran, but is injected with a black substance and wakes up again on the Kerberos. Maura tells Eyk that her father is the owner of the ship company. She uses the beetle to open a passage in the shaft in Eyk's room, which lead them to Eyk's burned house. Daniel disables the ticking, and the survivors regroup.
6	"The Pyramid"	Baran bo Odar	Jantje Friese & Emil Nygaard Albertsen	November 17, 2022
The survivors head to different tasks: Maura and Eyk look for the boy; Ramiro and Anker stay in the bridge with Sebastian; Ángel, Jérôme, Lucien, Olek, Ling Yi, and Franz head to the engine room to restart the engine; and Virginia, Clémence, Tove and Iben search for survivors. A black metallic substance begins to appear and grow in the ship. Tove experiences hallucinations of Krester and Ada, and has flashbacks of her rape by a feudal lord due to Krester's relationship with the lord's son, and her killing the lord. Olek and Ling Yi share their first kiss. Maura and Eyk return to the asylum; they find the walls appear to be the ship's hull. Virginia touches the substance and it spreads through her hand. Sebastian teleports off the ship and meets with Henry, who tells him to find the boy. The engine is restarted. Daniel follows Maura and Eyk; Eyk and Daniel fight, and Daniel teleports him away with the device. Daniel tells Maura they were married 12 years ago and that nothing in their world is real; Maura locks him in a room and takes the device. Eyk wakes to find himself on the Prometheus, surrounded by a sea of similarly abandoned ships.
7	"The Storm"	Baran bo Odar	Jantje Friese	November 17, 2022
The Kerberos sails into a storm. The survivors in the bridge head to the engine room for help. Halfway, Iben refuses to follow the rest of the survivors, and Anker stays with her. Olek and Ling Yi head to the bridge to steer the ship. Franz and Tove move to seal the bulkheads. Daniel breaks down a wall and climbs through a series of portals in different landscapes. Maura climbs through the shaft in Daniel's room and finds herself in an abandoned house; she sees flashbacks of her with Daniel and finds photographs of the two of them with the boy. Daniel finds the boy and pledges to restore Maura's memory so she can "end this loop once and for all"; the boy gives him a wedding ring. Daniel finds Maura and tells her that the boy is their son, named Elliot. He also tells her that they are in a simulation, and that she needs to find the override. Maura takes out a key from her locket. Lucien collapses from a seizure; Clémence and Jérôme try to get him to his medicine, but Lucien dies before it can be administered. Ling Yi sees a vision of Yuk Je and runs out; Olek saves her, but is swept overboard by a wave. Ángel is hit by falling debris and dies in Ramiro's arms. Franz sacrifices himself to save Tove. Iben and Anker drown together. Sebastian brings Elliot to Henry, and Henry demands the key from Maura over an intercom in exchange for her son. The simulation ends and the Kerberos is transported to the sea of ships, where the passengers find Eyk.
8	"The Key"	Baran bo Odar	Jantje Friese	November 17, 2022
Maura, Eyk, Jérôme, Clémence, Ramiro, Tove, Ling Yi and Virginia realize they all received a letter which led to them boarding the Kerberos. Maura tells them they are in a simulation orchestrated by her father, but all except Eyk distrust her and leave. Maura takes Eyk through the shaft in Daniel's room to his memories of their family. Maura and Eyk break down a wall and enter a series of portals. Henry injects Elliot with a white substance, unlocking a memory in which Maura injects Elliot with a black substance despite Daniel telling her to "let him go". Daniel hacks into the simulation, changing the code and causing many disruptions. The rest of the survivors escape from the rapidly expanding black substance in the ship, teleporting into each other's backgrounds before ending up back on the ship. Maura and Eyk run into Sebastian at the asylum. Sebastian uses a device to incapacitate Eyk, then take Maura to Henry and hands him the key. Henry tells Maura she is the Creator. Henry uses the key with the tetrahedron, but Daniel has made them useless. The simulation ends. Maura is reunited with Daniel, who tells her that Ciaran took over the program. Daniel gives her the means to leave, telling her he will "always be there". Maura wakes up alone in a starship called Prometheus, surrounded by many others that were on the Kerberos (but not Daniel), placed under suspended animation. On a computer terminal, she sees the date is 19 October 2099, and receives a message from Ciaran welcoming her to reality.

== Production ==
=== Development ===
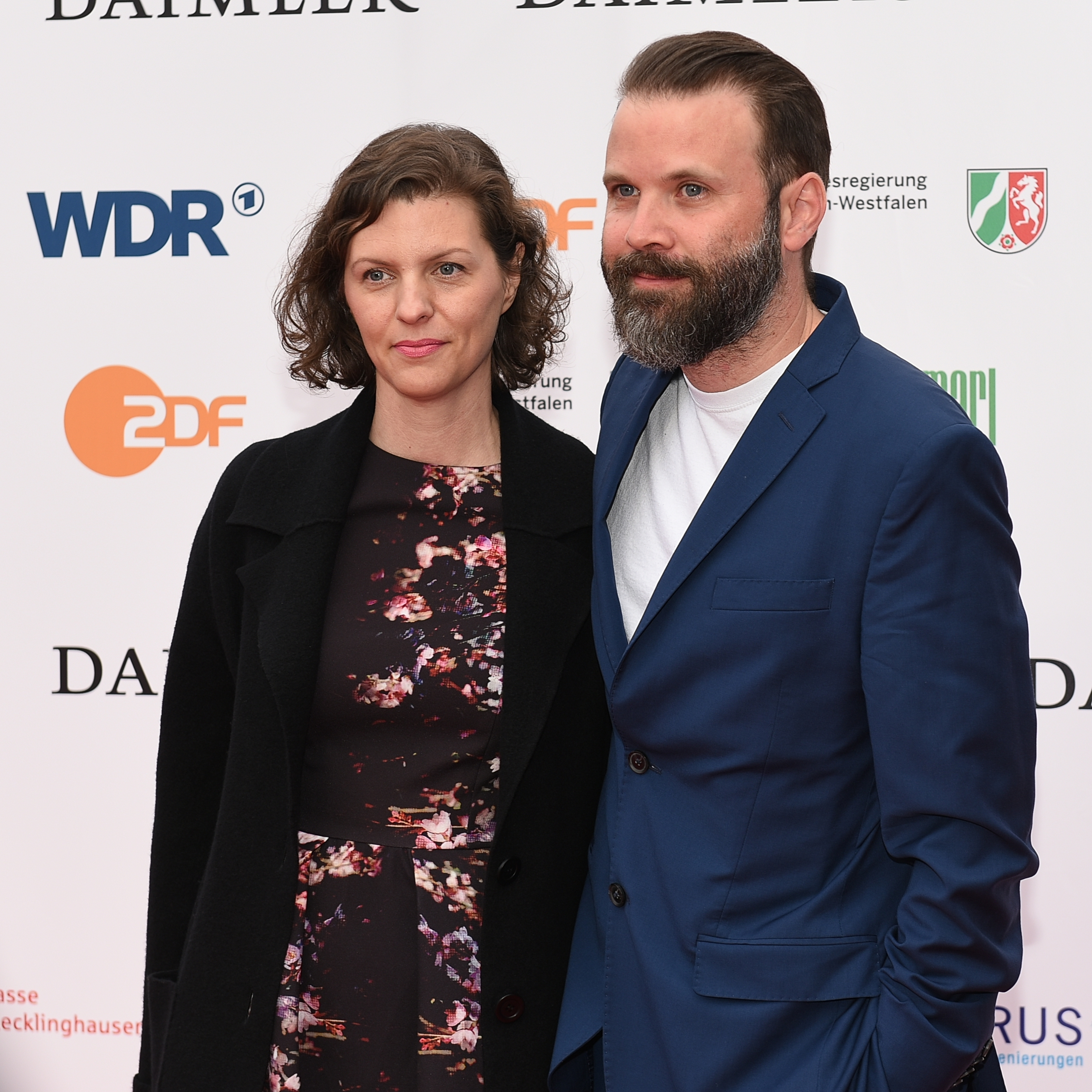
Series creators Jantje Friese (left) and Baran bo Odar (right)

On 13 November 2018, it was announced that Dark creators Jantje Friese and Baran bo Odar were developing the project for Netflix under their overall deal at the streaming service. The series was confirmed to be moving forward two weeks later during a Netflix press conference showcasing European original programming. By July 2020, bo Odar revealed via Instagram that Friese had completed writing the script for the pilot episode, titled "The Ship." During an interview with Deadline Hollywood, Friese explained how the European migrant crisis and Brexit were influential to the series, saying:

The whole European angle was very important for us, not only story wise but also the way we were going to produce it. It really had to be a European collaboration, not just cast but also crew. We felt that with the past years of Europe being on the decline, we wanted to give a counterpoint to Brexit, and to nationalism rising in different countries, to go back to that idea of Europe and Europeans working and creating together. Being true to the cultures and the languages was really important, we never wanted to have characters from different countries but everyone speaks English. We wanted to explore this heart of Europe, where everyone comes from somewhere else and speaks a different language, and language defines so much of your culture and your behaviour.

As with Dark, Friese served as the head writer of the show. The staff writing team comprised writers of different nationalities including Emma Ko (from Hong Kong and the UK), Coline Abert (from France), Jerome Bucchan-Nelson (from the UK), Juliana Lima Dehne (from Brazil and the US), Joshua Long (from the US), Darío Madrona (from Spain), and Emil Nygaard Albertsen (from Denmark). According to director Baran bo Odar, all scripts were first written in English, then the non-English sections were translated by the staff writers and/or translators. Odar had phonetic copies of the script on set, and language assistants were present during filming to ensure the accuracy of the dialogue.

Friese and bo Odar have ideas for two more seasons, with increased complexity compared to season 1. The planned three-season structure stems from Friese's and bo Odar's film background, where films have three acts. The first season served to establish the theme and characters and pose big questions. If ordered by Netflix, the second season would explain the symbology of the triangles, and Maura's brother would be an important character. bo Odar described this second act as "all about the fun and games, where you play with the theme, and maybe get a little bit more megalomaniacal and crazy, and then resolve it in the third season into a hopefully satisfying resolution."

=== Budget ===
The budget for the series was at least €60 million ($62.2 million) with €2 million coming from Medienboard Berlin-Brandenburg, €10 million coming from the German Motion Picture Fund, and Netflix investing €48 million in the project. 1899 is the most expensive German television series of all time.

=== Casting ===
On 16 December 2020, it was announced that Emily Beecham was cast in the lead role. On 2 May 2021, Aneurin Barnard, Andreas Pietschmann, Miguel Bernardeau, Maciej Musiał, Anton Lesser, Lucas Lynggaard Tønnesen, Rosalie Craig, Clara Rosager, Maria Erwolter, Yann Gael, Mathilde Ollivier, José Pimentão, Isabella Wei, Gabby Wong, Jonas Bloquet, Fflyn Edwards, and Alexandre Willaume were added to the cast, with each character speaking in the actor's native language.

=== Filming ===
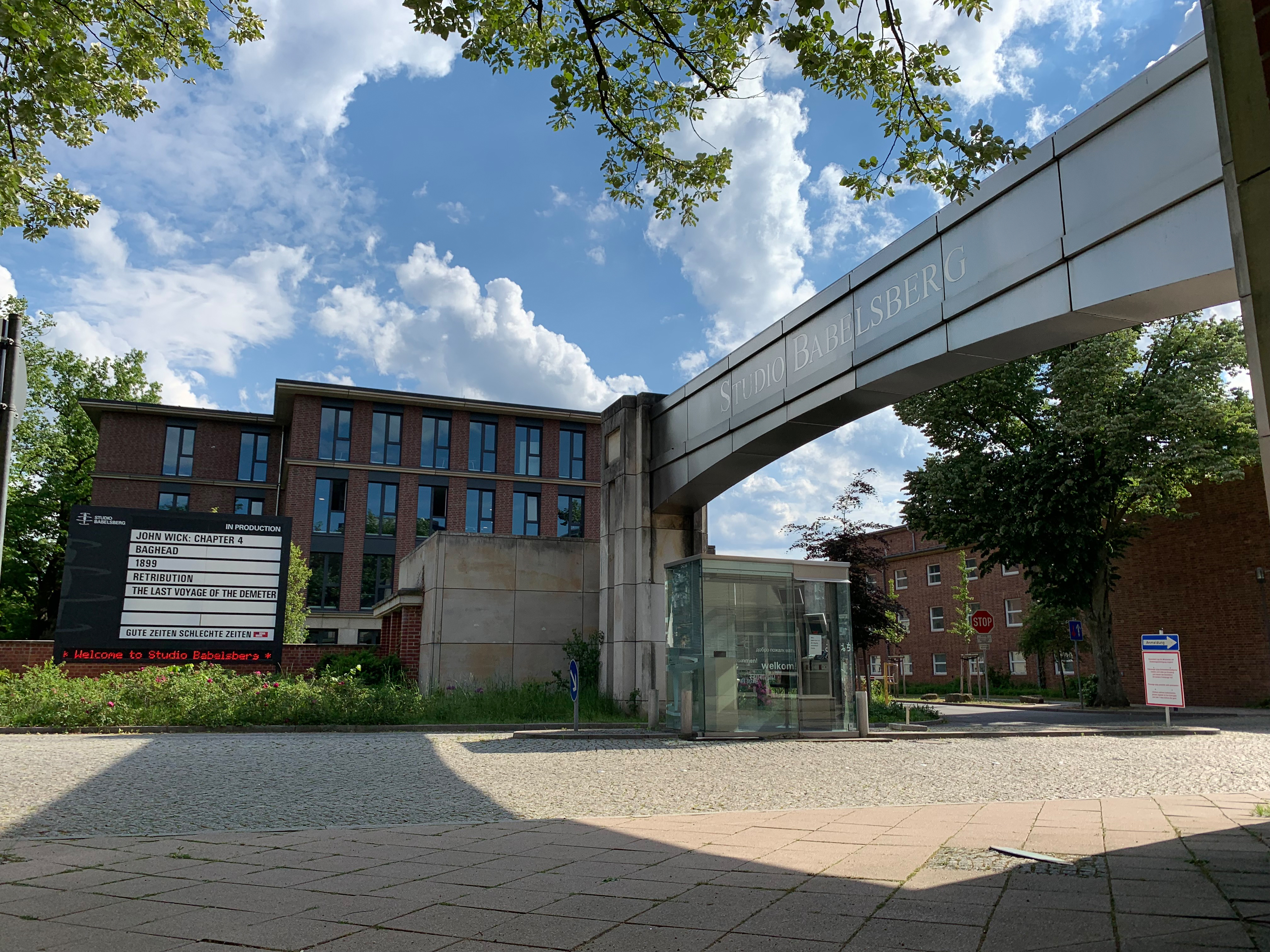
Main Entrance to Babelsberg Studios with production sign

Pre-production for the series officially commenced on 24 November 2020, with a week-long lens test shoot taking place. The series was initially scheduled to begin principal photography on 1 February 2021, but was later pushed back by 3 months. Filming officially began on 3 May 2021, at Studio Babelsberg in Potsdam, the only designated UNESCO Creative City of Film in Germany.

The series was shot in a new virtual production stage called Volume, operated by bo Odar and Friese's sister company Dark Bay, at Studio Babelsberg. Filming also took place in London, England. Creative studio Framestore provided visual effects for the series. Filming wrapped in November 2021 with Baran bo Odar posting on Instagram.

== Release ==
1899 had a two-episode premiere on 47th Toronto International Film Festival on 12 September 2022. The series launched on Netflix on 17 November 2022, along with a companion making-of documentary titled Making 1899.

Netflix announced a few days after release that 1899 was in 58 countries the most watched product of all the offerings available on Netflix at that time. Despite this, on 2 January 2023, the show was cancelled.

=== Plagiarism accusations ===
Shortly after the release of 1899, Brazilian comic book author Mary Cagnin, through her X account, claimed her comic book story Black Silence (2016) had been plagiarized by Baran bo Odar and Jantje Friese. Cagnin mentioned that several elements of Black Silence had been reproduced in 1899 and speculated that the series creators discovered her work at the 2017 Gothenburg Book Fair, in Sweden, where she had distributed copies of Black Silence's English version. Cagnin said she was "heartbroken" and had "cried a lot" over the issue. Her thread speculating how Black Silence had been plagiarized went viral in Brazil. Decider observed that "[a]side from an affinity for pyramids, it's hard to find many similarities" between the two projects", and noted that even when reading Black Silence with the specific goal of finding similarities to 1899, "the connections between the two properties were borderline nonexistent", concluding that "[c]reepy pyramids, suspicious suicides, weird codes, and outer space" are "incredibly common sci-fi tropes" and their appearance in both works is "not suspicious".

Jantje Friese responded to the allegations via her Instagram account with a post that was later deleted, stating that "a Brazilian artist has claimed we stole from her graphic novel. To make it clear: we did not! Until yesterday we weren't even aware of the existence of that graphic novel". Friese went on to say that "Over two years we have put pain, sweat and exhaustion into the creation of 1899. This is an original idea and not based on any source material. Nevertheless we've been bombarded with messages – some of them ugly and hurtful." The series creator also added that "someone cries wolf and everyone jumps on it, not even checking whether the claims make any sense. [...] Of course should this be a scheme to sell more of her graphic novels: well played, [...]". Baran bo Odar, through his own Instagram account, declared the creators of 1899 "would never steal from other artists as we feel as artists ourselves" and that they had reached out to Cagnin.

=== Cancellation and response ===
Writing in Forbes about the cancellation of 1899 and other Netflix series, Paul Tassi said that "I feel like Netflix is almost actively stealing my time from me. [...] It's frankly exhausting, and if it's this exhausting for viewers, I have to imagine it's ten times as much for showrunners and actors. Netflix is becoming a graveyard stacked with dead series with unfinished conclusions. [...] Something has to change."

Writing in Digital Spy, David Opie said that "for all we know, there might be talks to save the show at HBO or Prime Video, plus there's a small chance that Netflix themselves might try and wrap things up in a one-off special or movie. That's exactly what happened after fans decried Netflix's decision to cancel Sense8 a few years back [that is also an international genre show]."

Fans took to social media to decry the decision, and a petition to save the show was started on Change.org. As of July 2024, it had garnered over 100,000 signatures.

== Reception ==
=== Audience viewership ===
During its debut week, 1899 ranked at number two on Netflix's Top 10 TV English titles just three days after its release with 79.27 million hours viewed. The following week, the series remained at the same position and garnered 87.89 million viewing hours. In its third week, the series generated 44.62 million viewing hours, while also holding its position at number two.

=== Critical response ===
The series received generally positive reviews. On Rotten Tomatoes, it holds an approval rating of 79% based on 28 reviews, with an average rating of 6.80/10. The website's critical consensus states, "1899 navigates its multicultural passengers through an atmospheric mystery and delivers a suspenseful journey, even if it may never reach a satisfying destination." On Metacritic, which uses a weighted average, the series has a score of 66 out of 100 based on 12 critic reviews, indicating "generally favorable reviews".

Collider named 1899 as one of the best new TV shows of 2022, while MovieWeb ranked it the sixth best TV show of the year.

=== Accolades ===
Year	Award	Category	Nominee	Result	Ref.
2022	Camerimage	TV Series Competition	1899	Nominated	
2023	American Society of Cinematographers Awards	Outstanding Achievement in Cinematography in Episode of a Series for Non-Commercial Television	Nikolaus Summerer (for "The Calling")	Nominated	
2023	Critics' Choice Television Awards	Best Foreign Language Series	1899	Nominated	
2023	Grimme Prize	Best Fiction	1899	Nominated	
