= May Day in Kreuzberg =

May 1 street festivals in Berlin

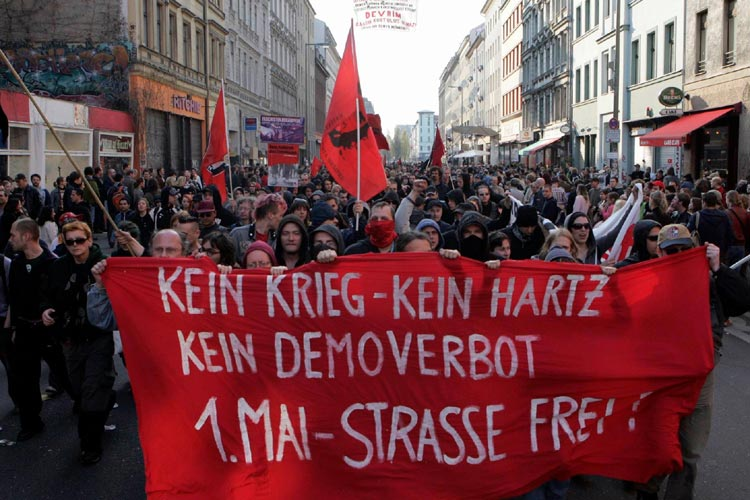
Unlicensed demonstration May 1, 2006, Berlin-Kreuzberg

May Day in Kreuzberg refers to the street festivals and demonstrations organized by left-wing and far-left groups on May 1, International Workers' Day, in the Berlin district of Kreuzberg. Specifically, the term may refer to 1 May 1987, when particularly severe rioting in Kreuzberg led to the Berlin police having to completely withdraw from the eastern area of Kreuzberg, SO 36, for several hours. Since then, autonomists and anti-fascist groups have held so-called "Revolutionary 1st of May Demonstrations" almost every year.

== Background ==
Kreuzberg has always been a hotspot for street battles between squatters or autonomists and the police. In particular, the district SO 36 has been the focus of the autonomous squatter and punk movement in Berlin.

On Labor Day, often referred to as the day of working-class struggle, Lausitzer Platz has traditionally hosted an annual street festival, organized by political groups including Autonomists, the Alternative List (AL) and the Socialist Unity Party of West Berlin (SEW). In the years before 1987, there were also minor riots, demonstrations and other political actions on the fringes of the street festival. These were, however, considered routine for Kreuzberg at the time and hardly recognized by the public.

Along with this annual street festival, ranks of the New Social Movements and the German Trade Union Confederation organized large May Day demonstrations in West Berlin.

In 1986 and 1987, the so-called Affected Block or Revolutionary Block, an entity which rejected the official policy of the German Trade Union Confederation, took part in the demonstrations.

The Block consisted mainly of persons from the New Social Movements, and came to over a thousand participants. Because of its rejection of the official policy of the German Trade Union Confederation, the police had to intervene to break up clashes - something welcomed by the speakers of the German Trade Union Confederation.

== 1 May 1987 ==
The Kreuzberg rioting on May 1, 1987, became known worldwide by the international press. It drew large public attention to the district, in particular, Kreuzberg SO 36.

=== Background to 1 May 1987 ===
In 1987, the left-wing political scene in Berlin was dominated by the census boycott, a campaign against the census and a call for its boycott. The center of this resistance (and the left scene in general) was situated at Mehringhof (in Kreuzberg 61), where, among other things, the campaign office was located. On May 1, 1987, at 4:45am, this office and other rooms of Mehringhof were broken up and searched by the police on the grounds of Periculum in mora.

The mood in Berlin was already tense due to the repressive measures of the CDU-led Senate and the preparations for the 750th anniversary of Berlin.

=== The riots ===
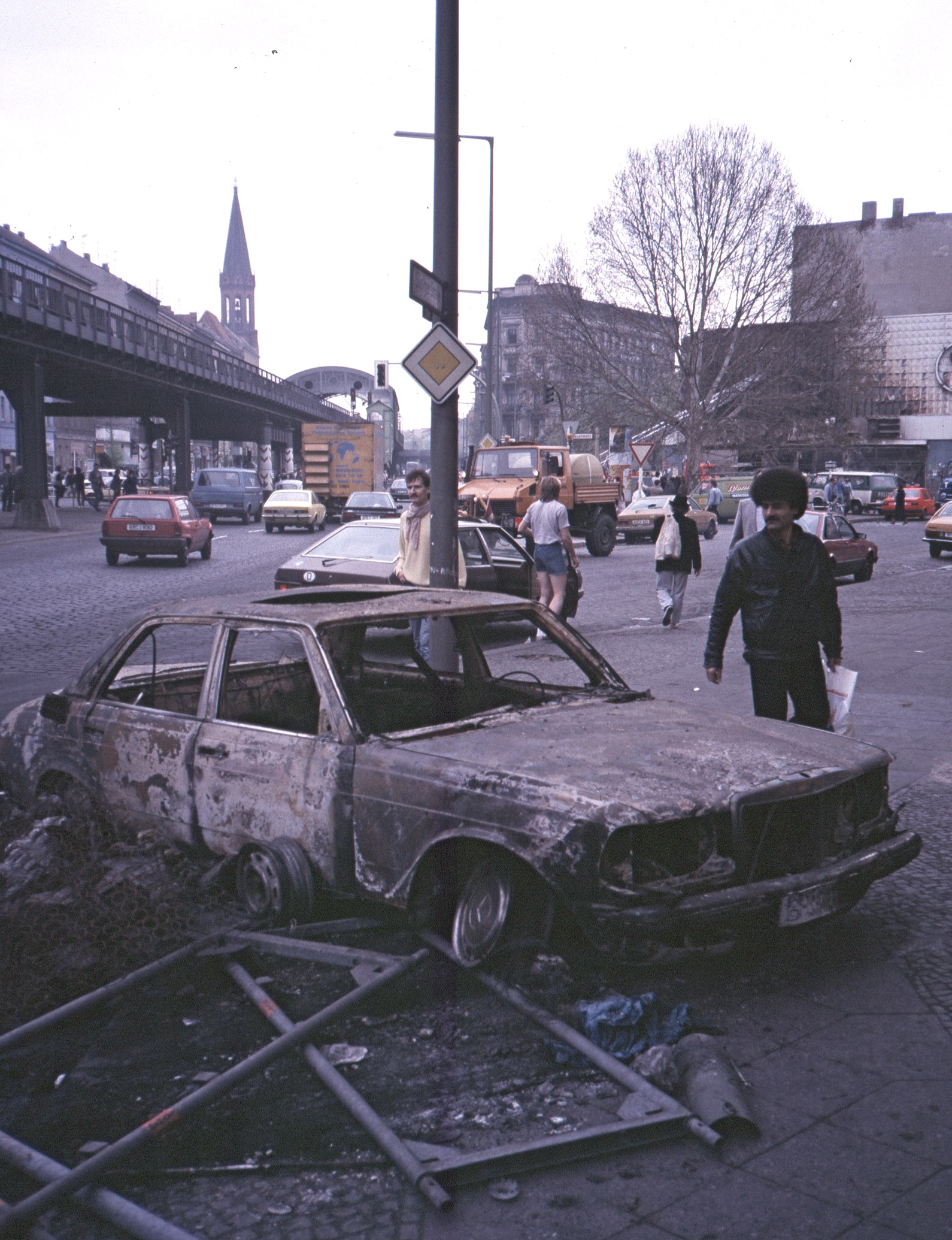
Skalitzer Straße with the burnt-out Bolle supermarket, May 2, 1987

The traditional street festival was peaceful at first, but the mood among the leftists was damaged by the search of the census boycott campaign office. In addition, the police had also initiated anti-rioting operations against the Affected Block at the 1 May demonstration of the German Trade Union Confederation. This led to the block leaving the German Trade Union Confederation demonstration under protest and joining the street festival.

At around 4pm, autonomists near the street festival overturned an empty police car and later that evening two construction trailers were thrown into the street. Meanwhile, most visitors enjoyed the street party unaware of any disturbances. Despite this, the police responded to the disruptions and finally broke up the whole festival using batons and tear gas.

As a result, visitors to the street festival erected barricades on several adjacent streets. The police retreated to the area around Skalitzer Straße at around 11 pm and remained there until the early morning.

Despite a cancellation of public transport to the area, and the erection of large roadblocks, more people arrived at the SO36 area throughout the evening. This was in part due to the live coverage of the events by leftist radio station Radio 100, which mobilized many sympathizers of the radical left-wing scene.

Barricades – including construction vehicles and parked cars – were erected and set on fire throughout the area. At each corner of Oranienstraße stood large burning barricades being defended by people throwing stones. Even Molotov cocktails and slingshots were used. Fire trucks of the Berlin fire department attempted to extinguish the fires were also attacked. In one of these incidents, a fire engine crew abandoned their vehicle, which was then also set alight.

More than thirty stores were looted, including small and large chain stores and independent retailers. The looting of a branch of the Berlin supermarket chain Bolle at the underground station Görlitzer Bahnhof attracted large media attention. After being looted, the Bolle supermarket building was set on fire and burned completely to the ground. However, according to the fire department, no danger was posed to the surrounding residential buildings. Only years later it became known that the supermarket fire was not caused by members of the autonomist scene, but by a lone pyromaniac who had witnessed the looting whilst passing by.

The underground station at Görlitzer Bahnhof, a center of the unrest, was set on fire, with hundreds of protestors drumming on the cast-iron struts of the elevated railway in order to make noise. The station had to be closed for several weeks until repairs were complete.

=== Putting down the riots ===
Between two and three o'clock in the morning on 2 May 1987, the police launched a counterattack. After hours of rioting and looting, plus the heavy consumption of stolen alcohol, the demonstrators were now largely fatigued. Using water cannons and armoured riot control vehicles, the police advanced against the burning barricades and the remaining protesters. The area of Kottbusser Tor, which was difficult for the autonomists to maintain, was pacified, as well as Adalbert and Oranienstraße. Also, the resistance at the Görlitzer Bahnhof and Lausitzer Platz gradually collapsed.

Over a hundred people were injured and 47 people were arrested. Among those arrested was Norbert Kubat, who took his own life on the night of 25–26 May whilst in police remand, after he was found hitchhiking along Skalitzer Straße by plainclothes officers on the morning of 2 May. In response to the suicide, there was an arson attack on a department store, Bilka, on Kottbusser Bridge during the night, and on May 28, a funeral march with approximately 1,500 participants took place.

=== Reactions ===
As a public reaction to the riots, a special unit of the Berlin Police, the Einheit für besondere Lagen und einsatzbezogenes Training (EbLT), was set up. This unit received special equipment and training for street fighting in order to make "evidence-capturing arrests" during violent demonstrations and to act aggressively in the center of the action. However, after a few missions, the unit received heavy criticism. It was accused of using disproportionate force against demonstrators by political groups, the media, the public and state institutions. The unit was dissolved in January 1989.

The Autonomous movement's interpretation of the events proved controversial: "Their judgments varied between the excitement of keeping the police out of the neighborhood for so long, and the fact that so many people took part in a revolt in what they considered to be completely depoliticized actions."

The actions were criticized for the alcohol abuse, accusations of sexism, the looting of small businesses, and for endangering the safety of others. "While some Autonomists generally endorsed the revolt and explained the negative outcomes by saying that people can not change their whole socialization overnight, and that the subjectivity of the people who took part in the revolt was an expression of social status, others have judged the revolt as a 'Riot of Assholes' without any political background."

== 1 May 1988 ==
In 1988, because of the previous bad experiences with the German Trade Union Confederation's 1 May demonstrations, especially surrounding the Revolutionary Block group, and the support they'd had within their "own neighborhood", organized a separate "Revolutionary 1st of May Demonstration".

Under the slogan "Heraus zum revolutionären 1. Mai" (Onwards to the revolutionary 1 May), and the quote from Rosa Luxemburg, "The revolution is great, everything else is quark", over 6,000 people were mobilized for the demonstration despite police countermeasures.

The demonstration was largely peaceful, but at the end of the street festival there were some fights between police and demonstrators on Lausitzer Platz.

Police actions on 1 May 1988 drew massive criticism, especially the new EbLT riot unit who were accused of using disproportionate force. Among other things, it was pointed out that three police chiefs who were observing the intervention operations were themselves victims of attacks by police officers and suffered minor injuries. The riots were determined to have been carried out by young people, tourists and the drunken, instead of by autonomists.

== 1 May 1989 ==
In 1989, the first Red-Green Senate in Berlin tried to defuse 1 May troubles using political and police restraint. Both the controversial EbLT police unit and the political department of the prosecution office had been dissolved in advance.

However, the mood within the left-wing radical movements was angered by the hunger strikes of the Red Army Faction prisoners and the arrest of two Berliners on charges of membership of the militant women's group, The Amazons. They also wanted to emphasize their rejection of an SPD-Green government.

On the night before 1 May, a building on Oranienstraße 192 was occupied and two shops were looted. The police used water cannons and arrested 16 people, but declared that they would not immediately clear the occupied building.

The next day's Revolutionary 1 May Demonstrations attracted about 10,000 people. The police were very reluctant to intervene during the demonstration. Even after the demonstration destroyed several sex shops, plundered a supermarket, set fire to a waste disposal container and looted another department store, the police only reacted by making a cordon.

After the demonstration was over and the participants had moved in large numbers to the street festival on Lausitzer Platz, clashes also occurred there. Initially the police only made a loudspeaker announcement to stop throwing stones, but then disbanded the festival using tear gas and water cannons.

The intensity of the ensuing riot surpassed that of 1 May 1987. Estimates suggest that more than 1,500 people participated in the violence. At times even larger police units were surrounded and forced to throw stones in return, since, according to them, their only other option would have been to shoot.

In contrast to the two previous years, the violence was hardly directed against businesses, but targeted the police. Of the 1,600 police deployed, 346 were injured. Property damage was estimated at 1.5 million marks. The damage to 154 police vehicles alone amounted to 530,000 DM. The next day, the Berliner Zeitung newspaper ran the headline: "Beirut??? No, that's Berlin!"

Within the Autonomous movement, the events were criticized, where questions were asked about the political motives behind the rioting and the purpose of it in regard to their goals. On May 10, the Trade Union of the Police organized a demonstration against Interior Senator Erich Pätzold's strategy of de-escalation and the violence on 1 May. It was later speculated that chief executive officer Heinz Ernst, who was close to the Die Republikaner political party, deliberately acted negligently to discredit Pätzold and his de-escalation strategy.

== 1 May 1990 ==
1 May 1990 was marked by the reunification of the two German states and the emerging of German nationalism. The motto of that year's Revolutionary 1 May Demonstrations testified to this: "Rather on the street than home to the Reich!"

In the run-up to 1 May 1990, the media reported negatively against the radical left-wing scene. The leftist movement tried to address this situation with a close coordination between the organization of the street festival and demonstration, as well as political action days in advance.

The demonstration was attended by about 12,000 people. In addition, another demonstration took place in East Berlin with 2,000 participants. In contrast to 1989, the demonstration was largely peaceful. In Berlin-Neukölln, however, several demonstrators were injured when they came under air rifle fire from a nearby residential building.

Although the street festival had been banned, it did take place and was peaceful. Despite or because of a massive police presence of roughly 3,800 officers, significant clashes were avoided until the evening, and even then their intensity and duration were not comparable to those of previous years.

The participation, estimated at 500 persons, was significantly lower than in the previous year. While Interior Senator Pätzold wrote that the relatively peaceful 1 May was a triumph of his "de-escalation and presence" concept, the Autonomous scene believed that the behavior of the police was the trigger for the riots.

As in previous years, disproportionate police violence was criticized. Interior Senator Erich Pätzold had to publicly apologize for a police attack against two press photographers and a camera team from Radio Free Berlin. According to the General Students' Committee of Technische Universität Berlin, the media were also responsible for the disturbances due to their reporting on the demonstration in the run-up to 1 May. Parallels were drawn to the murder of Rudi Dutschke. The Autonomists rated the day as a success, as both the demonstration and the street festival took place and with a growing number of demonstrators.

== Later years ==
In 1991, 1992 and 1993 there were conflicts regarding the route (through East or West Berlin) and also sometimes violent conflicts between different leftist groups over their attitude to Stalinism or Marxism–Leninism. The Revolutionary Internationalist Movement (RIM) was part of the demonstration in 1991 and 1992, but in 1993 they were expelled from the demonstration. Despite the conflicts, between 10,000 and 15,000 people participated in the Revolutionary 1 May Demonstration in each of the years. In 1994, this demonstration no longer took place: the RIM has since organized their own demonstration with 1–2,000 participants every year, while the undogmatic groups didn't have a demonstration in 1994 and 1995. In 1994, there was however a satirical "Demonstration against disturbance of the peace by night and against senseless violence", which 2,500 people attended.

In 1996, anti-fascist groups tried to resurrect the Revolutionary 1 May. In that year and the following ones, there was an undogmatic "Revolutionary 1st of May Demonstration" attracting 8,000 to 15,000 people, next to the RIM's demonstration that continued to take place. The Berlin police's new tactic is to counter violence by supporting alternative events, such as the new Kreuzberg street festival Myfest, which takes place in district SO 36, the traditional center of the riots. By having tens of thousands of peaceful attendees, this festival is supposed to stop the violence in its tracks. It has had some success in that the intensity of violence has decreased considerably, though there are smaller conflicts in the surroundings of the Myfest. The organizers of the "Revolutionary 1st of May Demonstrations" criticize the Myfest as a way to pacify social conflicts and ban radical left demonstrations. The Myfest enables authorities to forbid registered demonstrations to take certain routes. In 2005 and 2006, the official demonstrations were therefore cancelled by the organizers and spontaneous demonstrations took place after that. 2008 was the largest "Revolutionary 1st of May Demonstration" in 8 years, with 11,000 or 12,000 participants. There were minor clashes with the police, 162 arrests and 103 injured policemen.

== Since 2000 ==
In 2001, the 6pm Revolutionary 1 May Demonstrations was banned by police for the first and only time. At the conclusion of a 1pm demonstration, there were several spontaneous disruptions in Kreuzberg. The closing down of the street festival on the Mariannenplatz led to heavy street battles in the evening. In 1998 and 2000, certain parts of the route had been prohibited.

In reaction to the events of 2001, a group led by FU professor Peter Grottian proposed the concept "Think May New". This aimed "to have a big party with discussion, information and cultural events on all street corners" of the SO36 area of Kreuzberg. At the same time, they proposed that the police should withdraw completely from the area. The plans were met with strong criticism from a section of the radical left. The participation of the AAB in the concept led to a division within the Revolutionary 1 May Demonstration at 6pm's organizational group. As a result, two demonstrations - in addition to the 13 o'clock demonstration - took place. This split demonstration also took place in 2003.

Since 2003, the police have tried to counteract riots by promoting alternative events. This procedure is part of the Aha Konzept, first implemented in 1999, which supports, among other things, the annual Kreuzberg street festival, Myfest. The Myfest takes place in the traditional center of the riots in SO 36, and is intended to prevent them by promoting the presence of tens of thousands of peaceful visitors. The intensity of the violence has decreased significantly. Nevertheless, there are still at least a few riots around Myfest every year.

The organizers of the Revolutionary 1 May demonstrations criticize Myfest as an instrument for the pacification of social conflicts and the suppression of radical leftist demonstrations. Overlaps of demonstration routes with Myfest led in part to prohibitions of some sections of the registered demonstration routes. In 2005 and 2006, the demonstrations were canceled by the organizers at 6pm because they regarded the available space as unacceptable. As a result, spontaneous demonstrations formed both years. Since 2012, an unregistered demonstration has taken place regularly at the starting point of the 6pm demonstration.

Since 2007, registered Revolutionary 1 May Demonstrations have continued to take place. The number of participants has risen steadily and reached 19,000 people in 2014 (based on police statistics), reaching up to 25,000 people (based on organizer information). The intensity of the riots has decreased continuously. The most recent large-scale attacks on police occurred during the 2009 demonstration.

== Literature ==
- Geronimo: embers & ashes. Reflections on the policy of the autonomous movement. Unrast, Münster 1997, ISBN 3-928300-63-6.
- Reader Group (ed.): Autonomy Congress of undogmatic leftist movements. Points of view - provocations - theses. Unrast, Münster 1997, ISBN 3-928300-59-8.
- Dieter Rucht (ed.): Berlin, 1 May 2002. Political Demonstration Rituals. VS publishing house, Wiesbaden 2003, ISBN 3-8100-3792-3.
- "Black night". The mirror. No. 20. 1987. pp. 57–64.
- Joachim Nawrocki: Kreuzberg: Still far from being pacified. In: The Time, No. 20/1987.

== Films ==
- 1. Mai – Helden bei der Arbeit (feature film from 2008)
- Berlin May Festival (documentary from 2004)
