= Cordelia Wege =

German actress (born 1976)

Cordelia Wege (born 2 May 1976 in Halle) is a German actress. She focuses on stage work but has had numerous TV appearances, including in the Netflix series Dark.

== Biography ==
Wege studied acting at the University of Music and Theatre Leipzig from 1994 to 1998. She was with the Volksbühne in Berlin from 1998 to 2001, and also has been a member of companies at the Deutsches Schauspielhaus in Hamburg and Schauspiel Leipzig. Since 2018 her primary theatre appearances have been in Berlin, at the Deutsches Theater or Berliner Ensemble.

Though the focus of her career has been stage work, she is also known for her appearances in TV movies and TV shows. Among many other appearances, she played the role of Greta Doppler on the German-language Netflix series Dark, and has appeared in installments of the popular German TV crime shows Tatort and Polizeiruf 110.

Wege is married to theatre director Sebastian Hartmann, and they have four children.
