= Clara Rosager =

Danish actress and model (born 1996)

- Born: 2 November 1996 (age 29); Copenhagen, Denmark
- Occupation: Actor
- Years active: 2016–present

Clara Rosager (born 2 November 1996) is a Danish film actress and model.

== Filmography ==
=== Film ===
- 2016: En to tre nu - Cecilie
- 2018: Before the Frost - Signe
- 2018: The Purity of Vengeance - Rita
- 2020: Misbehaviour – Miss Sweden
- 2022: Morbius – girl
- 2022: The Kiss – Edith
- 2026: Supergirl – Blue Sklarian Raider

=== Television ===
- 2018–2020: The Rain – Sarah
- 2023: Those Who Kill – Alberte Hvilsted
- 2022: 1899 – Tove
- 2026: Uniformen
