= Maja Schöne =

German actress (born 1976)

- Born: 1 January 1976 (age 50); Stuttgart, West Germany
- Occupation: Actress
- Years active: 2001–present
- Spouse: Carlo Ljubek
- Children: 1

Maja Schöne (born 1 January 1976) is a German actress. She is best known for portraying Hannah Kahnwald in the Netflix TV show Dark.

== Biography ==
Schöne was born in Stuttgart and has an older brother. After graduating from high school, she completed a stage and director's internship. In 1997, she decided to become an actress and began studying at the Westphalian Drama School in Bochum, a program that she completed in 2001. Schöne moved to Hamburg in February 2001 and began appearing in Friedrich Schiller plays. In 2002 she received the Young Talent Promotion Award from the Friends of the German Playhouse. From 2007 to 2009 she acted in several roles at the Schauspiel Köln, the first being Brunhild in Friedrich Hebbel's Die Nibelungen. For this role, she received the award for best actress at the Theater Festival NRW. Since 2009 she has had an engagement at the Thalia Theater in Hamburg.

In 2004, she made her cinema debut in Mark Schlichter's film Cowgirl, alongside Alexandra Maria Lara, which earned her a nomination for the Undine Award. From 2008 to 2013, she was in the Stuttgart episodes of the crime series Tatort, playing the wife of the investigator Bootz. In 2011 she starred in Brigitte Bertele's film The Fire as a rape victim in search of retribution; for this role, she was awarded the German Actor Award for Best Actress.

She began her screen career in the German TV movie Schluss mit lustig! She appeared in a number of television series in her country, appearing in the late 2000s in film productions such as Buddenbrooks, Summertime Blues, and Tender Parasites. She appeared in the Tatort series between 2005 and 2015, playing Felix Klare's wife. She starred in the TV miniseries Neu in unserer Familie in 2017 as the matriarch who has children by two different men, and they all live in the same household. In 2017 she achieved international recognition as a member of the main cast of the Netflix sci-fi family drama television series Dark, in which she plays the role of Hannah Kahnwald.

She is married to the actor Carlo Ljubek and has a daughter.

== Filmography ==
- 2001: Schluss mit lustig!
- 2004: Doppelter Einsatz: Der Fluch des Feuers
- 2004: Das Zimmermädchen
- 2004: Cowgirl
- 2004: Der Traum vom Süden
- 2004: Aller Tage Abend
- 2005: Tatort: Im Alleingang
- 2005: Mörderische Erpressung
- 2005: Dow Jane Index
- 2006: Stubbe-Von Fall zu Fall: Verhängnisvolle Freundschaft
- 2007: Polizeiruf 110: Dunkler Sommer
- 2007: Tatort: In eigener Sache
- 2007: Tatort: Hart an der Grenze
- 2007: Der Dicke: Angstpartie
- 2007: 1. Mai – Helden bei der Arbeit
- 2008: KDD – Kriminaldauerdienst: Chancen
- 2008: Buddenbrooks
- 2008: Tatort: Das Mädchen Galina
- 2008: Tatort: Oben und unten
- 2008: Tatort: Tödliche Tarnung
- 2009: Tender Parasites
- 2009: Wanna Be (short film)
- 2009: Summertime Blues
- 2009: Tatort: Blutgeld
- 2009: Tatort: Altlasten
- 2010: KDD – Kriminaldauerdienst: Chancen
- 2011: Polizeiruf 110 – Feindbild
- 2011: The Fire
- 2012: Stralsund – Blutige Fährte
- 2012: Tatort: Spiel auf Zeit
- 2013: Bella Block: Hundskinder
- 2014: Frau Roggenschaubs Reise
- 2014: Sternstunde ihres Lebens
- 2015: Blochin – Die Lebenden und die Toten (TV miniseries)
- 2015: Tatort: Preis des Lebens
- 2016: Neu in unserer Familie
- 2017: Neu in unserer Familie 2 (TV film)
- 2018: Tatort: Du allein
- 2018: A Dark in the Light
- 2019: Eine fremde Tochter
- 2017–2020: Dark (TV series)
- 2020: Der Mann der die Welt aß
