= 1st of May: All Belongs to You =

2008 film

- Film poster
- German: 1. Mai – Helden bei der Arbeit
- Directed by: Carsten Ludwig; Jan-Christoph Glaser; Sven Taddicken; Jakob Ziemnicki
- Written by: Carsten Ludwig; Michael Proehl; Oliver Ziegenbalg; Jakob Ziemnicki
- Edited by: Carsten Eder; Jan-Christoph Glaser; Sebastian Marka
- Music by: Christoph Blaser; Steffen Kahles; Dirk Dresselhaus; Rainer von Viel
- Release date: 30 April 2008
- Country: Germany
- Language: German

1st of May: All Belongs to You (German: 1. Mai – Helden bei der Arbeit) is a 2008 German film. It was premiered as the opening film of the series "Perspektive Deutsches Kino" ran May 1 - Heroes at Work at the Berlinale 2008.

== Plot ==
Three episodes are interwoven in the film: "Uwe" is about a provincial police officer, "Excursion" is about two adolescents from the small town and "Yavuz" is about an eleven-year-old Turk. All three experience May Day in Kreuzberg.

Provincial police officer Uwe, deployed to Berlin with his colleagues to provide crowd control during the May 1 demonstrations, is cheated on by his wife at home. He visits a brothel. Ending up between the fronts during a demonstration, he gets hit by a water cannon and is injured on the nose.

Jacob and Pelle, two middle-class youths from Minden, go to Berlin in the hope of some drama, but can't make up their mind whether they are tourists or rioters. Scoring drugs turns out to be harder than expected.

The young Turk Yavuz wants to grow up, prove his masculinity and take part in the May 1 turmoil for the first time with his brother. On his journey through the oncoming chaos Yavuz gets to know old man Harry, with whom he builds a street barricade. Harry develops protective instincts for the boy.

The end of the day brings them all together in a Kreuzberg hospital.

== Cast ==
- Benjamin Höppner as Uwe
- Leonie Brandis as Ingrid
- Randy Herbst as Schinken-Raddatz Jr.
- Torsten Michaelis as Martin
- Hans Löw as Schröder
- Maja Schöne as Elke
- Thorsten Förster as Policeman #1
- Rüdiger Kühmstedt as Policeman #2
- Bruno F. Apitz as Einsatzleiter (billed as Bruno Apitz)
- Jacob Matschenz as Jacob
- Ludwig Trepte as 'Pelle' Pelletier
- Theo Vadersen as Busfahrer (billed as Teo Vadersen)
- Cemal Subasi as Yavuz
- Godehard Giese as Policeman
- Oktay Özdemir as Nebi
- Ozan Aksu as Bülent (billed as Ozan Akzu)
- Hassan Chahrour as Orhan
- Mehmet Subasi as Fikret
- Firat Besleyen as Cem
- Dagan Süleyman as Can
- Hannah Herzsprung as Ratte
- Peter Kurth as Hary
- Bärbel Schwarz as Spezi
- Frank Seppeler as Buddy
- Hinnerk Schönemann as Demonstrant
- Sinan Akdeniz as Turkish Gang Member
- Milot Berisha as Turkish Gang Member
- Youssef Chahrour as Turkish Gang Member
- Tore Mert as Turkish Gang Member
- Engin Özdemir as Turkish Gang Member
- Aylin 'Shorty' Firat as Dealerin
- Sigo Heinisch as Sveni
- Dirk Borchardt as Horsti
- Mackie Heilmann as Ramona
- Anna Parkina as Performance Girl
- Sarah Baumann as Performance Girl
- Fabian Schubert as Performance Besucher
- Alex Bechberger as Performance Besucher
- Christian Röhrs as Performance Besucher
- Burak Yigit as Performance Besucher
- Murat Yilmaz as Adolf Performance (billed as Murat Karabey Yilmaz)
- Maria Schumanski as Frau in U-Bahn (billed as Maria Wedig)
- Steffen Jürgens as Ramonas Kunde
- Annette Baar as Hospital Receptionist (billed as Annette Kitty Baar)
- Jonas Pappe as DJ im Club
- Sebastian Dasse as DJ im Club
- Luise Helm as Mädchen im Club
- Judith Hoersch as Mädchen im Club
- Marcel Sperling as Türsteher
- Jale Arikan as Yavuz's Mother
- Michael Kröchert as Sanitäter
- Peter Berning as Arzt
