= Dark (TV series) =

2017 German science-fiction television series

- Genre: Science-fiction; Thriller; Mystery; Tragedy
- Created by: Baran bo Odar; Jantje Friese
- Showrunners: Baran bo Odar; Jantje Friese
- Written by: Jantje Friese; Ronny Schalk; Marc O. Seng; Martin Behnke; Daphne Ferraro
- Directed by: Baran bo Odar
- Starring: See below
- Theme music composer: Apparat
- Opening theme: "Goodbye" by Apparat (featuring Soap&Skin)
- Composer: Ben Frost
- Country of origin: Germany
- Original languages: German; German Sign Language
- No. of seasons: 3
- No. of episodes: 26

Production
- Executive producers: Justyna Müsch; Jantje Friese; Quirin Berg; Max Wiedemann; Abraham Davies
- Production location: Germany
- Cinematography: Nikolaus Summerer
- Running time: 44–73 minutes
- Production company: Wiedemann & Berg Television

Original release
- Network: Netflix
- Release: 1 December 2017 – 27 June 2020

Dark is a German science-fiction mystery thriller television series created by Baran bo Odar and Jantje Friese. It ran for three seasons from 2017 to 2020. The story primarily follows four families from the fictional town of Winden, Germany, as they pursue the truth in the aftermath of a child's disappearance, unraveling a sinister time travel conspiracy that spans several generations. The series explores the existential implications of time and its effect on human nature and life, with its plot structure making prominent use of the bootstrap paradox. It features a large ensemble cast led by Louis Hofmann.

Dark debuted on 1 December 2017 on Netflix; it is the service's first German-language original series. The second season was released on 21 June 2019, while the third and final season was released on 27 June 2020.

Dark has received critical acclaim for its performances, casting, direction, writing, tone, visuals, themes, musical score, and the ambition and complexity of its narrative structure. It has been nominated for and won several awards. In 2021, the BBC ranked the series as the 58th greatest TV series of the 21st century.

== Overview ==
Children start vanishing from the German town of Winden, bringing to light the fractured relationships, double lives, and dark pasts of four families living there and unfurling a mystery that spans four generations.

The first season begins in 2019, but later grows to include 1986 and 1953 via time travel, when members of the show's central families become aware of a wormhole in the cave system beneath the local nuclear power plant. During the first season, secrets are revealed concerning the Kahnwald, Nielsen, Doppler, and Tiedemann families, and their lives begin crumbling as their ties are exposed. The conspiracy involves the missing children and the history of the town and its citizens.

The second season continues the families' attempts to reunite with their missing loved ones several months after the first-season finale, in 2020, 1987 and 1954, respectively. Additional storylines are set in 2053 and 1921. The second season introduces Sic Mundus Creatus Est, a major faction in the ongoing battle for the ultimate fate of the people of Winden and the world. The season counts down to the apocalypse.

The third season follows the four families across time in the wake of the apocalypse in 2020. It introduces a parallel world tethered to the first. The third season continues the 1954, 1987, 2020, and 2053 storylines in the first world, while also adding a new 1888 storyline and two 2019 and 2052 storylines in the second world, as the factions further their own desires for each world. The season also showcases the main events across all of these years, continuing the events of the season while also serving as backstory for the events of the first two seasons.

== Cast and characters ==
The first season takes place primarily in 2019 but expands to include stories set in 1986, 1953, and – in the final scene of the first season – 2052, with several characters portrayed at various ages by multiple actors.

The second season takes place several months after the first, depicting the initial stories in 2020, 1987, and 1954, respectively, while continuing the future-set storyline into 2053, and adding a fifth storyline, set in 1921.

The third season introduces a storyline based in 1888 and a parallel reality featuring alternate versions of many main characters.

=== Main characters ===
| Character | Life stage | Description | Actor | Season | | |
| Character | Life stage | Description | Actor | 1 | 2 | 3 |
|---|---|---|---|---|---|---|
| Jonas Kahnwald | Child | A young boy | Jonas Gerzabek | | | Guest |
| Jonas Kahnwald | Teen | A high school student struggling with his father's sudden suicide. Martha's love interest. | Louis Hofmann | Main | Main | Main |
| Jonas Kahnwald | Adult | A time traveller, known as "the Stranger" | Andreas Pietschmann | Main | Main | Main |
| Jonas Kahnwald | Elder | The leader of Sic Mundus, known as "Adam" | Dietrich Hollinderbäumer | | Main | Main |
| Hannah Kahnwald | Teen | Hannah Krüger, daughter of Sebastian Krüger, a quiet, but manipulative young girl | Ella Lee | Main | Guest | Guest |
| Hannah Kahnwald | Adult | Jonas' mother and Michael's wife, a physiotherapist; Silja Tiedemann's mother | Maja Schöne | Main | Main | Main |
| Ines Kahnwald | Teen | A young girl, a friend of Jana and Claudia | Lena Urzendowsky | Recurring | | Guest |
| Ines Kahnwald | Adult | Michael's adoptive mother, a nurse | Anne Ratte-Polle | Main | Main | Guest |
| Ines Kahnwald | Elder | Jonas' estranged grandmother | Angela Winkler | Main | | |
| Daniel Kahnwald | Adult | Ines' father, the chief of Winden Police | Florian Panzner | Main | Guest | Guest |
| Martha Nielsen | Child | A young girl | Luna Arwen Krüger | | | Guest |
| Martha Nielsen | Teen | Ulrich and Katharina's middle child, Bartosz's girlfriend and Jonas' love interest | Lisa Vicari | Main | Main | Main |
| Martha Nielsen | Adult | A survivor of the Apocalypse in an alternate reality, a member of Erit Lux, known as the "Female Stranger" | Nina Kronjäger | | | Main |
| Martha Nielsen | Elder | The leader of Erit Lux, known as "Eva" | Barbara Nüsse | | | Main |
| Magnus Nielsen | Teen | Ulrich and Katharina's eldest child, Franziska's boyfriend | Moritz Jahn | Main | Main | Main |
| Magnus Nielsen | Adult | A member of Sic Mundus | Wolfram Koch | | Recurring | Main |
| Mikkel Nielsen | Child | Ulrich and Katharina's youngest child who goes missing in 2019 and emerges in 1986 | Daan Lennard Liebrenz | Main | Main | Main |
| Mikkel Nielsen | Adult | Hannah's husband and Jonas' father, Michael Kahnwald, a painter who commits suicide | Sebastian Rudolph | Main | Guest | Guest |
| Ulrich Nielsen | Teen | A high school student struggling with his younger brother's disappearance | Ludger Bökelmann | Main | | Guest |
| Ulrich Nielsen | Adult | Katharina's husband; Magnus, Martha and Mikkel's father; a police officer | Oliver Masucci | Main | Main | Main |
| Ulrich Nielsen | Elder | A patient in a psychiatric facility, known as "the Inspector" | Winfried Glatzeder | | Main | Recurring |
| Katharina Nielsen | Teen | Katharina Albers, Ulrich's girlfriend, a high school student who struggles with her abusive mother | Nele Trebs | Main | Guest | Recurring |
| Katharina Nielsen | Adult | Ulrich's wife; Magnus, Martha, and Mikkel's mother; the school principal | Jördis Triebel | Main | Main | Main |
| Tronte Nielsen | Teen | Agnes and The Unknown's son, who just arrived in Winden with his mother | Joshio Marlon | Recurring | Guest | Guest |
| Tronte Nielsen | Adult | Jana's husband; Ulrich and Mads' father; a journalist | Felix Kramer | Main | | Guest |
| Tronte Nielsen | Elder | Jana's husband; Ulrich's father; Magnus, Martha, and Mikkel's grandfather | Walter Kreye | Main | Guest | Recurring |
| Jana Nielsen | Teen | A young girl, friend of Ines and Claudia | Rike Sindler | Recurring | | Guest |
| Jana Nielsen | Adult | Tronte's wife; Ulrich and Mads' mother | Anne Lebinsky | Main | | Guest |
| Jana Nielsen | Elder | Tronte's wife; Ulrich's mother; Magnus, Martha and Mikkel's grandmother | Tatja Seibt | Main | Guest | |
| Helene Albers | Child | A young girl who is pregnant | Mariella Aumann | | | Guest |
| Helene Albers | Adult | Katharina's abusive mother; a nurse at a psychiatric facility | Katharina Spiering | | Guest | Main |
| Agnes Nielsen | Child | Bartosz and Silja's daughter; Noah's younger sister | Helena Pieske | | Guest | |
| Agnes Nielsen | Adult | Tronte's mother who just came back to Winden with him | Antje Traue | Main | Recurring | Recurring |
| Franziska Doppler | Teen | Peter and Charlotte's daughter, Elisabeth's older sister, Magnus' girlfriend | Gina Alice Stiebitz | Main | Main | Main |
| Franziska Doppler | Adult | A member of Sic Mundus | Carina Wiese | | Main | Main |
| Elisabeth Doppler | Child | Peter and Charlotte's deaf daughter, Franziska's younger sister | Carlotta von Falkenhayn | Main | Main | Main |
| Elisabeth Doppler | Adult | Charlotte's mother, the leader of the survivors of the Winden apocalypse | Sandra Borgmann | | Main | Main |
| Peter Doppler | Teen | Helge's son who travelled to Winden after his mother's death | Pablo Striebeck | | | Guest |
| Peter Doppler | Adult | Charlotte's husband; Franziska and Elisabeth's father; Jonas' therapist | Stephan Kampwirth | Main | Main | Main |
| Charlotte Doppler | Teen | Charlotte Tannhaus, an orphaned girl raised by her guardian, H.G. Tannhaus | Stephanie Amarell | Main | | Guest |
| Charlotte Doppler | Adult | Peter's wife; Franziska and Elisabeth's mother; the chief of Winden Police | Karoline Eichhorn | Main | Main | Main |
| Helge Doppler | Child | Bernd and Greta's son | Tom Philipp | Main | Recurring | Recurring |
| Helge Doppler | Adult | Peter's father, a security guard at the power plant | Peter Schneider | Main | Recurring | Guest |
| Helge Doppler | Elder | Resident in a rest home who suffers from dementia | Hermann Beyer | Main | | Main |
| Bernd Doppler | Adult | Greta's husband; Helge's father, founder of the power plant | Anatole Taubman | Main | | Guest |
| Bernd Doppler | Elder | Helge's father, former director of the power plant, now retired | Michael Mendl | Recurring | Guest | Guest |
| Greta Doppler | Adult | Bernd's wife, Helge's abusive mother | Cordelia Wege | Main | Recurring | Guest |
| H. G. Tannhaus | Adult | A clockmaker | Arnd Klawitter | Main | Guest | Recurring |
| H. G. Tannhaus | Elder | Charlotte's guardian, a clockmaker, lecturer in theoretical physics, and the author of A Journey Through Time | Christian Steyer | Main | Guest | Main |
| Bartosz Tiedemann | Teen | Regina and Aleksander's son, Jonas' best friend and Martha's boyfriend | Paul Lux | Main | Main | Main |
| Bartosz Tiedemann | Adult | Silja's husband, Noah and Agnes' father; a member of Sic Mundus | Roman Knižka | | Guest | Recurring |
| Regina Tiedemann | Teen | Claudia's daughter who is bullied at school and suffers from depression | Lydia Maria Makrides | Main | Main | Guest |
| Regina Tiedemann | Adult | Aleksander's wife, Bartosz's mother, the owner of Waldhotel Winden | Deborah Kaufmann | Main | Main | Main |
| Aleksander Tiedemann (Boris Niewald, later Aleksander Köhler) | Teen | Boris Niewald, a young man from Gießen assuming the identity of the victim (Aleksander Köhler) of a violent bank robbery that he was involved in | Béla Gabor Lenz | Guest | Guest | Guest |
| Aleksander Tiedemann (Boris Niewald, later Aleksander Köhler) | Adult | Regina's husband, Bartosz's father, and the director of the power plant | Peter Benedict | Main | Main | Main |
| Claudia Tiedemann | Child | Egon and Doris' daughter, Helge's tutor, friend of Ines and Jana | Gwendolyn Göbel | Main | Guest | Guest |
| Claudia Tiedemann | Adult | Regina's mother, director of the power plant | Julika Jenkins | Main | Main | Main |
| Claudia Tiedemann | Elder | Jonas and Noah's mentor; a time traveller | Lisa Kreuzer | Recurring | Main | Recurring |
| Egon Tiedemann | Adult | Doris' husband; Claudia and Silja's father, a police officer | Sebastian Hülk | Main | Recurring | Recurring |
| Egon Tiedemann | Elder | Claudia and Silja's father, the chief investigator of Winden Police who is approaching retirement | Christian Pätzold | Main | Main | Recurring |
| Doris Tiedemann | Adult | Claudia's mother and Egon's wife | Luise Heyer | Main | Guest | Guest |
| Noah (Hanno Tauber) | Child | Bartosz and Silja's son | Till Patz | | | Guest |
| Noah (Hanno Tauber) | Teen | Bartosz's son. Agnes' older brother, an acolyte of Sic Mundus | Max Schimmelpfennig | | Main | Main |
| Noah (Hanno Tauber) | Adult | Charlotte's biological father; a priest and member of Sic Mundus | Mark Waschke | Main | Main | Main |
| Silja Tiedemann | Child | Hannah and Egon's daughter, Jonas and Claudia's half-sister | Aurora Dervisi | | | Guest |
| Silja Tiedemann | Teen | Elisabeth's interpreter, known as "the girl from the future" | Lea van Acken | Guest | Main | Main |
| Silja Tiedemann | Adult | Noah and Agnes' mother, Bartosz's wife | Lissy Pernthaler | | | Guest |
| The Unknown | Child | Jonas and Martha's son; a member of Erit Lux, believed to be the origin of the Knot. The three Unknowns operate together to ensure the apocalypse occurs in both Adam and Eva's worlds. | Claude Heinrich | | | Main |
| The Unknown | Adult | Jonas and Martha's son; a member of Erit Lux, believed to be the origin of the Knot. The three Unknowns operate together to ensure the apocalypse occurs in both Adam and Eva's worlds. | Jakob Diehl | | | Main |
| The Unknown | Elder | Jonas and Martha's son; a member of Erit Lux, believed to be the origin of the Knot. The three Unknowns operate together to ensure the apocalypse occurs in both Adam and Eva's worlds. | Hans Diehl | | | Main |
| Wilhelm Clausen | Adult | A police inspector called to Winden to investigate the disappearances that occurred in 2019. Brother of the real Aleksander Köhler, whose identity was assumed by Boris Niewald, now Aleksander Tiedemann. | Sylvester Groth | | Main | |

=== Recurring cast ===
- Jennipher Antoni as Ulla Obendorf, Erik Obendorf's mother in 2019 (Season 1)
- Nils Brunkhorst as the high school's science teacher in 2019 (Seasons 1 and 3)
- Lena Dörrie as Clara Schrage, a nurse attending to Helge Doppler in 2019 (Season 1)
- Tara Fischer as a friend of Katharina in 1986 and 1987 (Seasons 1, 2 and 3)
- Leopold Hornung as Torben Wöller, a police officer in 2019 and 2020, Bernadette's brother (Seasons 1, 2 and 3)
- Tom Jahn as Jürgen Obendorf, Erik Obendorf's father in 2019 and 2020 (Seasons 1, 2 and 3)
- Anna König as Edda Heimann, a pathologist in 2019 (Seasons 1, 3)
- Vico Mücke as Yasin Friese, Elisabeth Doppler's boyfriend who goes missing in 2019 (Season 1)
- Henning Peker as Udo Meier, a pathologist in 1953 and 1954 (Seasons 1 and 2)
- Barbara Philipp as Selma Ahrens, a caseworker in 1986 (Season 1)
- Paul Radom as Erik Obendorf, a teenage drug dealer who goes missing in 2019 (Season 1)
- Anton Rubtsov as Bernadette Wöller, a transgender prostitute in 2019 and 2020, Torben's sister (Seasons 1, 2 and 3)
- Sammy Scheuritzel as Kilian Obendorf, Erik Obendorf's older brother and Martha's boyfriend in 2019's alternative world (Seasons 1 and 3)
- Anna Schönberg as Donata Kraus, a nurse and Ines Kahnwald's co-worker in 1986 (Season 1)
- Andreas Schröders as a power plant worker in 2020 (Season 2)
- Mieke Schymura as Justyna Jankowski, a police officer in 2019 and 2020 (Seasons 1, 2 and 3)
- Axel Werner as Gustav Tannhaus, H.G. Tannhaus' grandfather and an industrialist fascinated with time travel (Season 3)
- Lea Willkowsky as Jasmin Trewen, Claudia Tiedemann's secretary in 1986 and 1987 (Seasons 1 and 3)
- Roland Wolf as a police officer and co-worker of Egon Tiedemann in 1953 and 1954 (Seasons 1 and 2)

== Family tree ==
Family tree of characters

Sebastian Krüger ?-? | Sebastian Krüger ?-?
Doris Tiedemann; 1922-1964 | Egon Tiedemann; 1922-1987 | Hannah Kahnwald née Krüger; 1972-1911 | Hannah Nielsen née Krüger; 1972-? | Egon Tiedemann; 1922-2020 | Doris Tiedemann; 1922-1964
Greta Doppler; 1917-1972 | Bernd Doppler; 1913-1987 | Claudia Tiedemann a.k.a. The White Devil b. 1942 d. 1954 / ∅ | Claudia Tiedemann; 1942-2040A | Bernd Doppler; 1913-? | Greta Doppler; 1917-1972
Helge Doppler; 1944-1986 | Regina Tiedemann; 1971-2020 | Aleksander Tiedemann né Köhler a.k.a. Boris Niewald; 1966-2020 | Aleksander Tiedemann né Köhler a.k.a. Boris Niewald; 1966-2019 | Regina Tiedemann; 1971-2019 | Helge Doppler; 1944-?
Peter Doppler; 1970-2020 | Charlotte Doppler née Tannhaus; 2041-∅ | Bartosz Tiedemann; 2003-1921 | Silja Tiedemann née Krüger; 1988-1910 | Silja Tiedemann née Krüger ?-? | Bartosz Tiedemann; 2003-∅ | Charlotte Doppler née Tannhaus; 1971-∅ | Peter Doppler; 1970-2019
Franziska Doppler; 2003-∅ | Elisabeth Doppler; 2011-∅ | Hanno Tauber a.k.a. Noah; 1904-1921 | Agnes Nielsen; 1910-∅ | The Unknown ?-∅ | Agnes Nielsen ?-? | Hanno Tauber a.k.a. Noah; 1904-∅ | Elisabeth Doppler; 2011-∅ | Franziska Doppler; 2003-2019
Hermann Albers ?-? | Helene Albers née Wolf; 1942-? | Jana Nielsen; 1942-? | Tronte Nielsen; 1941-∅ | Tronte Nielsen; 1941-∅ | Jana Nielsen; 1942-2019 | Helene Albers née Wolf; 1942-? | Hermann Albers ?-?
Katharina Nielsen née Albers; 1970-1987 | Ulrich Nielsen a.k.a. The Inspector; 1971-1987 | Mads Nielsen; 1973-1986 | Ulrich Nielsen; 1971-1986 | Katharina Nielsen née Albers; 1970-2019 | Mads Nielsen; 1973-1986
Magnus Nielsen; 2001-∅ | Martha Nielsen; 2003-2020 | Michael Kahnwald a.k.a. Mikkel Nielsen; 2008-2019 | Mikkel Nielsen; 2008-2019 | Magnus Nielsen; 2001-2019
Jonas Kahnwald a.k.a. Adam b. 2003 d. 2019E / ∅ | Martha Nielsen a.k.a. Eva b. 2003 d. 2053A / 2052 / ∅

- A = Adam's world
- E = Eva's world
- ∅ = Character ceases to exist
- ? = Year unknown

== Episodes ==
| Series | Episodes | Originally released |
|---|---|---|
| 1 | 10 | 1 December 2017 |
| 2 | 8 | 21 June 2019 |
| 3 | 8 | 27 June 2020 |

=== Season 1 (2017) ===
| No. overall | No. in season | Title | Directed by | Written by | Original release date |
|---|---|---|---|---|---|
| 1 | 1 | "Secrets" "Geheimnisse" | Baran bo Odar | Jantje Friese | 1 December 2017 |
On June 21st, 2019, 44-year-old Michael Kahnwald commits suicide in the art studio in his house's attic. His mother Ines hides his suicide letter before anyone else can see it. On November 4th, after two months of treatment at a psychiatric facility due to his father's suicide, Michael's teenage son Jonas returns to school and reunites with his best friend Bartosz Tiedemann, who, at Jonas' request, has told everyone that Jonas was at a two-month exchange program in France, and who has also recently started dating Martha Nielsen, a girl whom Jonas has a crush on. Erik Obendorf, the local drug-dealing teenager, has been missing for two weeks, and police officer Ulrich Nielsen – the father of Martha and her brothers, 18-year-old Magnus and 11-year-old Mikkel – has been assigned the investigation, which struggles to uncover any clues. Meanwhile, Ulrich is cheating on his wife Katharina, the school principal, with Jonas's mother Hannah. At night, while searching for Erik's stash of drugs in a cave not far from the town's soon-to-be-closed-down nuclear power plant, Jonas, Bartosz, the three Nielsen children, and Magnus' girlfriend Franziska are frightened by strange sounds and their flickering flashlights, and Mikkel disappears as they flee. The next day, the police finds the body of a young boy in the woods, but Ulrich quickly points out that the boy isn't Mikkel. At an unknown location decorated like a nursery, a hooded figure straps Erik to a chair while clamping a mechanism around his head.
| 2 | 2 | "Lies" "Lügen" | Baran bo Odar | Jantje Friese & Ronny Schalk | 1 December 2017 |
On November 5th, 2019, Mikkel's disappearance brings back memories from 1986 when Ulrich's younger brother Mads vanished without a trace, and Ulrich starts believing that the disappearances of Erik, Mikkel, and the body of the third boy are related. While searching the caves, he finds a locked door that leads to the nuclear power plant, and although Ulrich's request to enter the power plant is refused by its director Aleksander Tiedemann, Bartosz's father, he is able to clear Jürgen Obendorf, Erik Obendorf's father, a driver for the power plant, from his list of suspects. Police chief Charlotte Doppler is informed that the dead boy, dressed in an outfit from the '80s, died only 16 hours earlier, and that his ears were destroyed by extreme pressure, along with his eyes being charred. Later, as lights start flickering and birds begin falling dead from the sky, Charlotte grows even more concerned. In the room where Erik is being held captive, an undisclosed accident results in his death and leaves his eyes charred; shortly thereafter, a hooded figure begins dragging Erik's lifeless body through the woods at night. Meanwhile, an unkempt stranger checks into the hotel owned by Bartosz's mother Regina. At dawn, a disoriented Mikkel wakes up inside the cave and runs home, only to discover via a newspaper on the doorstep that the date is November 5th, 1986.
| 3 | 3 | "Past and Present" "Gestern und Heute" | Baran bo Odar | Jantje Friese & Marc O. Seng | 1 December 2017 |
On November 5th, 1986, four weeks after the disappearance of 12-year-old Mads Nielsen, a desperate Mikkel is found by police chief investigator Egon Tiedemann, who suspects he has been beaten by the rebellious teenage Ulrich, whom he has a feud with. Mikkel is brought to the hospital by Ines, then a nurse, who gains his trust. At the nuclear plant, newly elected director Claudia Tiedemann, Egon's daughter and Regina's mother, clashes with her predecessor Bernd Doppler, who informs her of secret barrels of radioactive waste hidden in the nearby caves. Bernd's son Helge, gives Claudia a book: Eine Reise durch die Zeit (A Journey Through Time) by H. G. Tannhaus. Meanwhile, as the town's electricity starts flickering, quiet teenage Charlotte starts investigating the deaths of multiple birds in Winden, shy young Hannah has unrequited feelings for Ulrich, and depressed teenage Regina is being bullied at school and engages in self-harm. A flock of sheep is found dead by farmer Hermann Albers, Katharina's father, from cardiac arrest with their eardrums ruptured, which puzzles Egon. Mikkel escapes from the hospital and returns to the caves; after breaking his leg, he calls for help. In an undisclosed location, a man surrounded by clocks tinkers with a brass machine. On November 5th, 2019, at night, Ulrich, also having returned to the caves, hears Mikkel's faint calls, but they are unable to see each other due to being 33 years apart.
| 4 | 4 | "Double Lives" "Doppelleben" | Baran bo Odar | Martin Behnke & Jantje Friese | 1 December 2017 |
On November 6th, 2019, Jonas finds maps and notes about the caves in his father's art studio in the attic, while Charlotte tries to find a connection between the missing boys and the dead birds, which – just like the dead boy found earlier – have burst eardrums. The birds also show similar symptoms to birds found after the Chernobyl disaster in the area, and Charlotte suspects connections to the Winden events of 1986. Meanwhile, her marriage to her husband Peter, a therapist, is crumbling since he was discovered to be having an affair with a transgender prostitute named Bernadette a year ago, and she finds evidence that Peter was out driving the night of Mikkel's disappearance, despite him claiming otherwise. Their eldest daughter, Franziska, confides in her boyfriend Magnus that she plans to leave Winden due to her parents' wrecked marriage. Franziska's deaf younger sister, Elisabeth, is feared missing after not returning from school, but eventually comes home hours later, explaining that she met a mysterious man - Noah - who gave her a watch once apparently belonging to Charlotte. Meanwhile, Peter's elderly father Helge, who suffers from dementia and has a mangled ear, is found roaming alone in the forest by police officer Torben Wöller, while claiming that he "must stop Noah". The next morning, a hooded figure approaches Elisabeth's boyfriend, Yasin, and tells him that Noah has sent him.
| 5 | 5 | "Truths" "Wahrheiten" | Baran bo Odar | Martin Behnke & Jantje Friese | 1 December 2017 |
On November 7th, 1986, Mikkel is visited in the hospital by a priest: Noah. After having discovered that Ulrich and Katharina are in a relationship, an envious Hannah falsely tells Egon that she saw Ulrich rape Katharina, which causes him to get arrested by Egon himself, who expresses great satisfaction in doing so. On November 7th, 2019, Yasin has also now vanished, and panic is starting to spread in Winden. Charlotte accuses Peter of being involved in the boys' disappearances. Hannah wants to resume her affair with Ulrich, but he angrily refuses as he's more concerned with trying to find his son. At the hotel, the Stranger tells Regina to deliver a package to Jonas while he is away for a few days. At Michael's grave, the Stranger approaches Jonas, telling him that Jonas' father once saved his life, but he only understood that much later. Bartosz meets Erik Obendorf's supposed drug supplier, who turns out to be Noah, after receiving a call on Erik's phone that was on the latter's drug stash he took from near the caves. That evening, Jonas goes to school to watch the rehearsal of Martha's play and, in the dressing room, he confides in her that he was at a psychiatric facility rather than in France, he then asks why she contacted him instead of Bartosz that morning, but Martha simply embraces him in a passionate kiss. Later that night, at home, Jonas receives the Stranger's package, containing a futuristic orb light, a Geiger counter, and Michael's suicide note. In the letter Jonas' father explains that on November 4th, 2019, he traveled back to 1986. There, he stayed and grew up, being raised by Ines, eventually marrying Hannah and fathering Jonas. Thus Mikkel Nielsen became Michael Kahnwald.
| 6 | 6 | "Sic Mundus Creatus Est" (transl. Thus the World Was Created) | Baran bo Odar | Jantje Friese & Ronny Schalk | 1 December 2017 |
On November 8th, 2019, Katharina and Martha struggle not to turn against each other regarding their opinions on what happened to Mikkel, Regina discovers that she has breast cancer, and Ulrich learns that his father Tronte was having an affair with Claudia on the night of Mads' disappearance and that his mother Jana lied to Egon during her interrogation by claiming her husband was at home having dinner. After learning that Regina was the last one to see Mads alive in 1986, Ulrich confronts her at her hotel. While she admits to resenting him for bullying her during their teenage years, she makes him see that Hannah was the one who framed him of rape, not her. Visiting the morgue, Ulrich finally realises that the dead boy that was found in the woods is actually Mads, whose body has not aged since 33 years ago. Meanwhile, Jonas fails to tell his mother about her husband's suicide letter but enters the caves armed with his father's notes and the equipment from the package sent by the Stranger. Within the caves, he finds a door with a Latin phrase, Sic mundus creatus est ("Thus the world was created"), and he goes through. On November 8th, 1986, at night, after going through to the other side, Jonas notices flyers put up for the missing Mads Nielsen. A van drives by and stops near a bus stop; in it are young Hannah and her father Sebastian, who offer Jonas a ride in the rain, warning him about contaminated rain from the recent Chernobyl disaster, but he declines and walks away.
| 7 | 7 | "Crossroads" "Kreuzwege" | Baran bo Odar | Jantje Friese & Marc O. Seng | 1 December 2017 |
On November 9th, 1986, Helge, who was working at the plant on the night Mads disappeared, is questioned by Egon about his whereabouts at the time. The Stranger explains to Jonas that Mikkel is indeed his father and warns him that taking Mikkel back to 2019 will result in Jonas never being born. Katharina tries to convince Egon that Ulrich didn't rape her, but he doesn't believe her. On November 9th, 2019, the police are finally allowed to enter the power plant, and in the caves Charlotte finds a door that is welded shut. Ulrich finds Egon's old police notes from 1986, which reveal Helge was supposed to be interviewed in Mads' disappearance case, but he didn't show up, and so, Ulrich visits him at the nursing home. Frightened, Helge claims to be able to change the past and future as the orderlies drag Ulrich away after he tries to assault Helge. Ulrich is suspended from the police force by Charlotte for what he did at the nursing home and Katharina confronts him about his affair. Charlotte discovers that the cave system goes beneath an old cabin owned by Helge. She receives a voice message from Ulrich, stating that Helge is the kidnapper, but that the question is not how he is doing it, but when. Late at night, Helge leaves the nursing home and enters the caves in the woods, followed by Ulrich, who brings a book from Helge's room: Eine Reise durch die Zeit by H. G. Tannhaus. On November 9th, 1953, at night, middle-aged Helge, along with Noah, prepare to move Yasin's dead body from a bunker behind Helge's cabin in the woods, but not before Noah writes the date, "09.11.1953" underneath "05.11.1953" on the wall of the bunker.
| 8 | 8 | "What you sow, you will reap" "Was man sät, das wird man ernten" | Baran bo Odar | Martin Behnke & Jantje Friese | 1 December 2017 |
On November 10th, 1953, birds begin to fall dead from the sky, and the unidentified bodies of Erik and Yasin are discovered at the construction site of the nuclear power plant. Police chief Daniel Kahnwald, Ines' father, and police officer Egon Tiedemann are puzzled by the boys' odd outfits. Ulrich arrives from 2019 after emerging from the caves and meets several locals, including newcomer Agnes Nielsen and her young son Tronte, respectively Ulrich's grandmother and father, who are about to rent a room at the Tiedemann household, and a watchmaker named H. G. Tannhaus, who disclaims knowledge of the book in Helge's 2019 room that Ulrich shows him, as he has not written it yet. Through the young Ines and Jana, Ulrich learns of the two recently discovered bodies, and when introduced to a 9-year-old Helge, he believes killing him will save the lives of Erik, Yasin, Mads and Mikkel. He bludgeons young Helge and leaves him to die in the bunker. Later, Tannhaus finds Ulrich's smartphone he accidentally left behind at his clock shop. On November 10th, 1986, the Stranger meets an elderly Tannhaus, who shares his theory of time travel through wormholes with him. The Stranger confirms his theories and states that such wormhole, allowing people to travel either into the past or into the future, though only in 33-year increments, exists in Winden. He asks Tannhaus to fix a broken brass device of his, so he can destroy the wormhole. Tannhaus later brings out the original version of the device, studying them side by side, after ordering the Stranger to leave his shop.
| 9 | 9 | "Everything Is Now" "Alles ist Jetzt" | Baran bo Odar | Jantje Friese & Marc O. Seng | 1 December 2017 |
On November 11th, 1986, teenage Ulrich is released without charges, and Hannah finds out that a newly arrived young man, who calls himself Aleksander Köhler, is living under a false identity. When Bernd admits that the hidden barrels contain byproducts of a small meltdown, Claudia secretly hires Aleksander to weld shut the door to them. In an argument with Helge (revealing that the abducted boys died from Noah's attempt to create a time machine) Noah states his mission to free humanity, likening himself to the Biblical Noah. On November 11th, 2019, Hannah blackmails Aleksander into destroying Ulrich's life. She lies to Katharina that Ulrich wanted to leave her for Hannah. Regina discovers the Stranger's research after entering his hotel room, and Jonas, now aware that Martha is his biological aunt due to Mikkel being his father, tersely rejects her after she kisses him again. Bartosz is approached by an elderly Claudia, his supposedly dead grandmother, at his house. Later, Bartosz meets with Noah again and agrees to join him. On November 11th, 1953, Helge has been reported missing, and Noah – appearing the same age as in 1986 and 2019 – offers pastoral support to Helge's mother, Greta. Ulrich is arrested by an adult Egon Tiedemann and confesses to bludgeoning Helge with the intent of killing him. The Claudia of 2019 enters Tannhaus' shop with blueprints for the brass machine, asking him to build it for her.
| 10 | 10 | "Alpha and Omega" "Alpha und Omega" | Baran bo Odar | Jantje Friese & Ronny Schalk | 1 December 2017 |
On the night of Mikkel's disappearance, Peter is crying at the bunker due to his marriage falling apart when Mads' body suddenly appears through a time rift. He calls Tronte to the bunker, and Claudia arrives shortly after him, telling them to move Mads' corpse to the woods for it to be found the next morning by the police. On November 12th, 1986, the elderly Helge is killed in an attempt to stop his younger self from working to Noah by deliberately crashing his car into him. Meanwhile, Jonas, who has also returned to 1986 after having a fight with Bartosz, following Martha's confession to him that she kissed Jonas, attempts to bring Mikkel back to 2019, but Noah and Helge kidnap him to prevent him from doing that. Jonas wakes up in the nursery-decorated bunker, accompanied by the Stranger, who reveals himself to be an adult Jonas. The Stranger leaves to destroy the wormhole using the brass machine that Tannhaus has completed from the broken version brought to him by the adult Jonas and Ulrich's smartphone. Middle-aged Claudia starts to read Tannhaus' book that Helge gave to her. On November 12th, 2019, Charlotte discovers a news article from 1953 about Helge's disappearance, which includes a mugshot of Ulrich, who is identified as a potential child murderer. Noah tells Bartosz that Claudia is their main adversary, and that the adult Jonas, unwittingly, is about to create the wormhole. On November 12th, 1953, young Helge regains consciousness as a wormhole appears in front of him, connecting him to Jonas in 1986. As they reach out to each other, Helge is transported to 1986, while Jonas awakens in a post-apocalyptic Winden in 2052. He is accosted by a gang of bandits and welcomed to the future by an armed woman, who, shortly thereafter, knocks him out.

=== Season 2 (2019) ===
| No. overall | No. in season | Title | Directed by | Written by | Original release date |
|---|---|---|---|---|---|
| 11 | 1 | "Beginnings and Endings" "Anfänge und Enden" | Baran bo Odar | Jantje Friese & Daphne Ferraro | 21 June 2019 |
On June 21st, 1921, a young Noah and another man are building the passage that will become the time travel portal in the future. Noah kills the other on suspicions that he had "lost faith". The younger Noah is guided by his older self, a member of a society of time travellers called Sic Mundus led by the disfigured and mysterious Adam. Adam tells the adult Noah to retrieve Claudia's diary in preparation for an "apocalypse" that will occur on June 27th, 2020. On June 21st, 2020, six days before the apocalypse, things in Winden have grown tense. A federal investigator, Clausen, arrives to help the police of Winden investigate the disappearances, which now include Helge, Ulrich, and Jonas. Katharina searches the cave for answers. Martha breaks up with Bartosz, who is now working with Noah, under the suspicion that he is hiding something from her. The adult Jonas reveals his identity to Hannah. Aleksander has a truck of radioactive waste moved into the power plant. On June 21st, 2053, the teenage Jonas is stuck in a post-apocalyptic Winden. He is monitored by the now adult Elisabeth, who survived the apocalypse and now leads a group of survivors. She forbids entry to the power plant under penalty of death. Jonas enters the Dead Zone nonetheless and finds a large, floating amorphous black blob.
| 12 | 2 | "Dark Matter" "Dunkle Materie" | Baran bo Odar | Jantje Friese & Ronny Schalk | 21 June 2019 |
On June 22nd, 1987, Mikkel struggles to adapt to life with Ines. Old Claudia visits her younger self, giving her coordinates to a time machine buried in her backyard. Egon has retired and begun to doubt his actions regarding the dead children's bodies in 1953. He interviews Helge (who tells him about a White Devil) and goes to the local psychiatric facility to visit an elderly Ulrich, who has spent 34 years incarcerated. Ulrich rebuffs Egon for his naivety. On June 22nd, 2020, five days before the apocalypse, Clausen and Charlotte interview Regina, who is slowly dying from cancer. She discusses the Stranger who left his belongings at her hotel, which included pages from Tannhaus' book. The newfound evidence makes Charlotte, who was raised by Tannhaus, question her origins. Adult Jonas informs Hannah about time travel and takes her to 1987, where they see Mikkel at Ines' house. On June 22nd, 2053, Jonas learns via recordings by Claudia about the "God Particle", the blob in the reactor usable as a portal for time travel. He is caught by Elisabeth going through a hole in the wall that surrounds the power plant. She begins to hang him publicly, but relents and imprisons him instead. Elisabeth's interpreter Silja, curious, frees Jonas. They enter the Dead Zone and access the God Particle. Jonas heads inside, leaving Silja behind.
| 13 | 3 | "Ghosts" "Gespenster" | Baran bo Odar | Jantje Friese & Marc O. Seng | 21 June 2019 |
On June 23rd, 1954, a young and disfigured Helge returns but refuses to talk to anyone but Noah, with whom he spent the last seven months in 1987 building a new time machine. Doris cheats on her husband, Egon, with Agnes. The elderly Claudia later meets with Agnes, a former member of Sic Mundus. Agnes meets with Noah, her brother, and tells him the location of the missing pages. Claudia delivers Tannhaus' book to him, then apologizes to her father's younger self, to his confusion. Claudia encounters Noah in the forest, who kills her. Noah retrieves the missing pages and is dismayed by his findings. He lies to Adam about finding the pages. Egon unsuccessfully interviews Helge and visits a catatonic Ulrich in jail. On June 23rd, 1987, Egon visits the older Ulrich at the asylum. Ulrich tells Egon his identity, which reminds Egon of claims Mikkel made when he first showed up in 1986 at the police station. After interviewing Ines, Egon shows the old Ulrich a photo of Mikkel. Ulrich attacks Egon and is quickly restrained. Egon visits Claudia at work to tell her he has cancer, and then she uses the time machine she found to travel to 2020; she cries upon seeing a dying Regina at her home and is shocked to see a news report from 1987 about her father's death.
| 14 | 4 | "The Travelers" "Die Reisenden" | Baran bo Odar | Jantje Friese & Martin Behnke | 21 June 2019 |
An injured Jonas finds himself in Winden at the year 1921, where he is nursed by the inhabitants. He then tries to return to 2020 through the portal, but is stuck because the portal has yet to be built. Noah escorts him to meet Adam, who reveals himself to be an elderly Jonas. On June 24th, 2020, three days before the apocalypse, adult Jonas and Hannah meet Charlotte and Peter at the bunker and they discuss about the existence of time travel, which they also reveal to a skeptical Katharina. The 1987 version of Claudia visits Winden's public library, where she discovers a report on Egon's death; she then travels back to 1987. Clausen interviews Aleksander, who reveals his original surname – Köhler – before he married Regina. Martha, Magnus, Franziska, and Elisabeth visit the cave, where they find Bartosz carrying a time machine. The kids take the time machine and leave Bartosz tied up in the cave. Katharina searches the school archives for a 6th-grade class photo of 1986 and identifies Mikkel in it, confirming Jonas' claims. On June 22nd, 2053, Silja walks into the power plant, where she is confronted by the adult Elisabeth at gunpoint. They have a heated conversation in which Elisabeth admits her knowledge of the God Particle.
| 15 | 5 | "Lost and Found" "Vom Suchen und Finden" | Baran bo Odar | Jantje Friese & Ronny Schalk | 21 June 2019 |
On June 25th, 1921, Adam speaks with Jonas, who is appalled by the callous person he is to become. Adam shows Jonas the God Particle, which will take him to any time he wants. Jonas decides to go to the day before his father killed himself to convince him not to do it. On June 25th, 1987, Claudia invites Egon to move in with her in hopes of preventing his impending death. Ulrich escapes the psychiatric ward to visit Mikkel at the Kahnwald house. After a conversation, Mikkel realises that the old man talking to him is actually his father. Ulrich tries to take Mikkel to the caves but is apprehended by the police. On June 25th, 2020, two days before the apocalypse, Katharina attempts to explain to Magnus and Martha what she discovered but is rebuffed by the two for her distant behaviour. Katharina then approaches Hannah for help understanding time travel. The Stranger goes to the Doppler house to help Charlotte, who explains that Tannhaus is not her real grandfather and that she never learned her parents' identities. Magnus, Martha, Franziska, and Elisabeth return to the caves, where Bartosz explains the time machine before taking them to 1987. Noah visits Charlotte at Tannhaus's workshop, revealing to her that she is his daughter.
| 16 | 6 | "An Endless Cycle" "Ein unendlicher Kreis" | Baran bo Odar | Jantje Friese & Martin Behnke | 21 June 2019 |
Jonas travels back from 1921 to June 20th, 2019 to stop Michael from killing himself. Jonas' 2019 self goes to the lake with Martha, Bartosz, and Magnus; Mikkel unknowingly has a close encounter with his adult self; Charlotte and Peter struggle in the wake of Peter's affair; Aleksander fears his past will catch up to him. After witnessing his 2019 self leaving the lake, 2020 Jonas shares a kiss with Martha. 2019 Jonas and Hannah arrive at the Nielsens' house to attend Ulrich and Katharina's 25th wedding anniversary party, where Jonas and Martha have sex and Ulrich starts his affair with Hannah. 2020 Jonas reconciles with his father as he tries to convince him to not kill himself. However, Michael states that he is not considering suicide and reveals that Jonas was the one who led Mikkel into the portal back to 1986 in the first place. After reading his suicide note, Michael suggests Jonas is really there to inform Michael of what he must do. The elderly Claudia arrives at their house and convinces them that Michael must die and Mikkel must travel to the past so Jonas can be conceived. On June 25th, 1921, two members of Sic Mundus—older versions of Magnus and Franziska—share concerns with Adam.
| 17 | 7 | "The White Devil" "Der weiße Teufel" | Baran bo Odar | Jantje Friese & Marc O. Seng | 21 June 2019 |
On June 26th, 1954, Egon learns from the coroner that Claudia, discovered to have been shot to death, had unusual amounts of radiation exposure. They theorize that she kidnapped Helge, but Helge says "he" told her about Claudia, the White Devil. Hannah travels to 1954 and asks to see Ulrich at the asylum. Ulrich promises he will leave Katharina for her if she helps him get out, but she does not believe him and coldly walks away, irritating Ulrich. On June 26th, 1987, Claudia tries to prevent the death of her father. Egon deduces that she knows about time travel and is selfishly using the caves for her own gain. He threatens to send officers to investigate the caves and a fight for the telephone ensues. During the struggle, Egon slips on his own and dies after hitting his head on the furniture. In his last breath he tells her she is the White Devil. 2020 Jonas arrives and tells Claudia they still may be able to change the events. On June 26th, 2020, one day before the apocalypse, Martha meets adult Jonas. Clausen confronts Aleksander about his background and informs him that in 1986 his own brother disappeared and that his name was Aleksander Köhler. Clausen shows him an anonymous note explaining that the answers to his brother's disappearance could be found in Winden. Aleksander says nothing.
| 18 | 8 | "Endings and Beginnings" "Enden und Anfänge" | Baran bo Odar | Jantje Friese & Daphne Ferraro | 21 June 2019 |
On June 27th, 1921, Noah tries to kill Adam for lying to him, but his gun jams as soon as he pulls the trigger. Adam says he cannot be killed because that is "not his fate". He then explains that Elisabeth will become young Noah's wife and therefore Charlotte's mother, after which Agnes appears and shoots Noah dead. On June 27th, 2020, the day of the apocalypse, young Jonas explains to middle-aged Claudia that her elder self taught him how to save the world, whereas Adam wants to destroy it. Charlotte learns of the radioactive waste buried in the power plant; she believes that Clausen will provoke the apocalypse. Peter, Elisabeth, 1987 Claudia, Regina, and teen Noah take shelter in the bunker. Young Jonas and Martha reunite but are interrupted by Adam, who shoots Martha, killing her in the process. In the power plant, Clausen opens the drums containing rocks soiled with dark matter. On June 27th, 2053, Elisabeth activates the time machine, simultaneously as Magnus and Franziska do so, too, in 1921. Katharina enters the cave and opens the gate, opening a portal linking Elisabeth in 2053 to Charlotte in 2020. As Winden is razed by the apocalypse, adult Jonas takes Bartosz, Magnus, and Franziska to an unknown time, while teenage Jonas meets another version of Martha who says she is not from another time, but from another world.

=== Season 3 (2020) ===
| No. overall | No. in season | Title | Directed by | Written by | Original release date |
|---|---|---|---|---|---|
| 19 | 1 | "Deja-vu" | Baran bo Odar | Jantje Friese | 27 June 2020 |
In 1987, the "Unknown"—a time traveler appearing as his child, adult, and elder selves at the same time—burns down the Sic Mundus church, and later assassinates Bernd Doppler inside his own house, stealing the keys to the nuclear power plant. Amidst the apocalypse in 2020, Jonas and the "other" Martha travel to a parallel world where Jonas was never born; Martha explains that this was the day she met him, then disappears. As of November 4th, 2019 in this alternate world, Martha is dating Kilian Obendorf, Erik's older brother, instead of Bartosz; Katharina and Ulrich, who is the chief of police instead of a regular police officer, are divorced; Hannah is pregnant and married to Ulrich, who is having an affair with Charlotte; Peter is a priest instead of a therapist; Franziska is deaf instead of Elisabeth; and Regina is dead. While searching for the missing Erik near the caves, Martha, Bartosz, Kilian, Magnus, and Franziska are frightened by strange sounds and their flickering flashlights, and they eventually come across the body of Mads Nielsen while seeking refuge in the bunker. Jonas later meets an elderly Martha, who tells him that even though he does not exist in this world, it will nonetheless fall apart again and again. Alternate-dimension Martha travels back to September 21st, 1888 to meet adult Jonas, who has spent the past months building a device to activate the God Particle. Martha informs him she has come to find the origin of events in each of their worlds.
| 20 | 2 | "The Survivors" "Die Überlebenden" | Baran bo Odar | Jantje Friese & Marc O. Seng | 27 June 2020 |
In 1888, Franziska, Magnus, Bartosz, and adult Jonas learn about the second world from alternate-dimension Martha. The elderly Gustav Tannhaus – H.G. Tannhaus' grandfather – promises Jonas he can create a paradise. Bartosz shows Martha a secret lodge where Gustav's father Heinrich attempted to build a time machine. Martha reveals to Bartosz that Jonas is Adam. In 1987, adult Katharina visits Ulrich at the psychiatric ward and promises to liberate him. Tronte's marriage with Jana is strained following Mads' disappearance and Tronte's affair with Claudia. Tronte visits Regina, who he believes is his daughter, and decides to stop investigating Claudia's disappearance. The Unknown breaks into the power plant and murders Jasmin Trewen, Claudia's secretary. In September 2020, three months after the apocalypse, an ailing Regina is visited by the elderly Tronte, who reluctantly smothers her to death. Peter and Elisabeth learn that a perimeter wall will be built around Winden. They encounter the teenage Noah, who promises to protect Elisabeth. In alternate-dimension 2019, the elderly Martha shows Jonas the entire Winden family tree. She tells him that in her world, the apocalypse will happen in just three days.
| 21 | 3 | "Adam and Eva" "Adam und Eva" | Baran bo Odar | Jantje Friese | 27 June 2020 |
In 1888, the Unknown murders Gustav Tannhaus. Bartosz clashes with Jonas, enraged that he did not disclose that he is Adam. Jonas tells Martha about Heinrich's attempt to build the time machine to prevent his wife's death. Martha gives Jonas dark matter for his God Particle machine, who then tries and fails to activate it. Martha uses the distraction to travel to 2053, where she is revealed to be taking orders from Adam. In alternate 2019, the elderly Martha tells Jonas that she is "Eva" — Adam's counterpart in this world — and that her connection with Jonas ties the two worlds in an inseparable "knot". Eva claims that whereas she wants to save both worlds, Adam wants to destroy them, and that if Jonas wants Martha to live he must guide the Martha of Eva's world to become Eva herself. Later, the Unknown is shown to be working for Eva and delivers her the keys to the power plant's control system. Elsewhere in Eva's world, a devastated Ulrich informs his colleagues at the police station about an unidentified boy's body bearing Mads Nielsen's student ID card being found in the bunker. Helge confesses to the police that he killed Mads, later that night, which infuriates Ulrich as he demands to know what did he do to Mads, but Helge says he recognizes him. Hannah learns of Ulrich's affair and blackmails Aleksander to ruin Charlotte's life. Kilian, who has been kicked out of his dorm thanks to Ulrich thinking he drugged Magnus and Martha, breaks up with Martha after she implies she doesn't trust him and after he points out that she is only dating him to rebel against and anger her parents. Jonas takes Martha through the wormhole in the cave. The two emerge in a future desert landscape and are approached by an adult Martha.
| 22 | 4 | "The Origin" "Der Ursprung" | Baran bo Odar | Jantje Friese | 27 June 2020 |
In 1954, young Tronte meets the Unknown at the woods, who implies he is his father. Egon is having an affair with Hannah; she then becomes pregnant and tells Egon, who gives her money for an abortion. While waiting, Hannah meets a young Helene Albers — Katharina's mother. Hannah ultimately reconsiders and leaves. Jana begins to fall for Tronte, while Tronte loses his virginity to Claudia. Doris learns from the Unknown that Egon is having an affair; she decides to divorce him. The Unknown coerces Winden's mayor into approving the construction of the nuclear power plant. In 2052 in the post-apocalyptic Eva's world, the adult Martha tells Jonas and young Martha they can prevent the apocalypse if they can stop the opening of the barrels in the power plant. After they leave, Noah of Eva's world appears and remembers the adult Martha that the Winden family lineage is an infinite circle. Jonas and Martha return to 2019 and have passionate sex in her room. Adam has moved Sic Mundus' base of operations to 2053. Agnes says she knows the true origin of the cycle and later enters the God Particle. Adam reveals to Martha that she is pregnant, and that her child with Jonas—the Unknown—is the origin of the family tree.
| 23 | 5 | "Life and Death" "Leben und Tod" | Baran bo Odar | Jantje Friese | 27 June 2020 |
In 1987, Katharina tries to rob Helene, who works at the psychiatric facility, in the woods to obtain her keycard in order to free Ulrich. Helene bludgeons Katharina to death with a rock and drowns her body in the lake. H.G. Tannhaus reveals to the teenage Charlotte that she was given to him by two mysterious women shortly after his son, daughter-in-law, and granddaughter were killed in a car crash. In 2020, Peter continues to look for Charlotte and Franziska, despite Elisabeth believing they are dead. Returning to their trailer, they encounter a marauder who murders Peter before being killed by Elisabeth. She goes to the cave and is comforted by Noah. Meanwhile, Claudia is met by her doppelgänger from Eva's world, who assigns her to save both worlds and gives her the journal for the first time. In 2019 in Eva's world, Jonas leads Martha to the power plant to prevent the apocalypse. After she injures her face at the same place the Martha who brought Jonas to her world had a scar, he realizes they are merely perpetuating the cycle of events in her world. He and Martha go to confront Eva. She tells Jonas he has served his purpose, after which another teenage Martha emerges and shoots Jonas dead.
| 24 | 6 | "Light and Shadow" "Licht und Schatten" | Baran bo Odar | Jantje Friese & Marc O. Seng | 27 June 2020 |
In 2020, Claudia and Jonas — apparently still alive — go to the abandoned power plant and find the God Particle in a dormant state. Claudia persuades Jonas to help her restore it. In 2052 in Eva's world, Eva explains to the young Martha who just killed Jonas that Martha's death in Adam's world is the exact point at which two parallel realities overlap in quantum entanglement: in one scenario, alternate Martha saves Jonas from the apocalypse; in the other, Jonas survives on his own and eventually becomes Adam. The young Martha of Eva's world travels to the day of the apocalypse in 2019. Unable to reach Aleksander, she and Bartosz race to the power plant, but are intercepted by the adult Magnus and Franziska from Adam's world, who send Martha on a mission to rescue Jonas. Bartosz encounters his adult self, sent by Eva alongside the other acolytes of Erit Lux (transl. Let There Be Light, her world's counterpart to Sic Mundus). The Unknowns travel to the year 1986 in both worlds to release radioactive waste at the power plant – this eventually causes the wormhole to be created and the apocalypse to happen years later. Aleksander and Charlotte open the barrels at the power plant, unleashing the apocalypse in Eva's world and killing many of Winden's citizens. In 2053 in Adam's world, Adam tries to destroy the origin by activating the God Particle at the exact time of both apocalypses and releasing all their energy onto a pregnant Martha, killing her and her child the Unknown.
| 25 | 7 | "In Between Time" "Zwischen der Zeit" | Baran bo Odar | Jantje Friese | 27 June 2020 |
In one scenario of the 2020 apocalypse, Martha from Eva's world saves Jonas; in the other, she is stopped by Bartosz of Eva's world. He takes Martha back to Eva, who instructs her to kill Jonas when he arrives with the other Martha. In 1890, Bartosz meets Silja, who was sent from 2053 by Adam. They go on to have two children together: Hanno (Noah) and Agnes (whose birth results in Silja's death). In 1911, Hannah arrives with her young daughter Silja to stay with Jonas, who has begun to transform into Adam. Jonas murders Hannah and sends Silja to post-apocalyptic Winden. Jonas and Claudia work fruitlessly to reactivate the God Particle through 2041, by which point Charlotte has been born to Noah and Elisabeth. The adult Elisabeth and Charlotte from 2053 travel to 2041, kidnap baby Charlotte, and deliver her to H.G. Tannhaus. Noah's search for his daughter leads to his initiation into Sic Mundus by Adam in 1920. Claudia kills her counterpart from Eva's world and begins posing as her for Eva, all the while collecting information about both worlds. In 2052, the elderly Claudia sends the adult Jonas on his 2019 mission to Winden. In 2053, Adam's attempt to destroy the Origin fails to erase his existence, baffling him. He is then met by an elderly Claudia, who tells him she knows how both worlds are connected.
| 26 | 8 | "Paradise" "Das Paradies" | Baran bo Odar | Jantje Friese | 27 June 2020 |
Claudia - who used the Apocalypse's quantum entanglement to get to 2053 - explains to Adam that he and Eva are trapped in an inextricable triquetra knot that originated outside both their worlds. Having deliberately lied to both of them to preserve the endless cycle of cause and effect, she reveals that while things in both worlds may not happen the same way or at the same time, they always happen and no one can escape their fate, as illustrated by Ulrich from Eva's world traveling back in time while pursuing Helge through the caves, mirroring what Ulrich from Adam's world did, only to, instead, end up in 1986, bludgeon middle-aged Helge, causing him to lose an eye, and eventually die in the bunker after being attacked by the elderly Helge with a crowbar. Claudia directs Adam to prevent the origin in a third, original world where H.G. Tannhaus built a time machine to prevent the death of his family, inadvertently destroying his world and splitting it into the worlds of Adam and Eva. Using quantum entanglement, Adam returns to the day of the Apocalypse in his world and takes young Jonas to Eva's world, urging him to collect Martha and prevent the origin of the knot from being created. Adam then confronts Eva and, to her shock, refuses to kill her as she remembers discovering when she was younger. Recognizing that the cycle has been broken, Eva embraces Adam. Jonas and Martha travel to 1971 in the origin world through the passage in the caves and successfully save Tannhaus' family, thereby erasing both worlds from existence. The only characters who remain in the origin world are those whose birth was not a result of time travel. Peter is in a happy relationship with Bernadette; Katharina and the cancer-free Regina are single; and Hannah is expecting a child with Bernadette's brother Torben Wöller, whose eye has healed. At a dinner party in 2019, Hannah notices a yellow raincoat in the corner of the room and experiences a brief moment of déjà vu. After being asked by Katharina what she will name her child, Hannah answers that she has always liked the name "Jonas".

== Production ==
Netflix approved the series in February 2016 for a first season consisting of ten one-hour episodes. Principal photography started on 18 October 2016 in and around Berlin (including Saarmund and Tremsdorf in Brandenburg), and ended in March 2017.

The church where Jonas meets Noah was filmed at the Stahnsdorf South-Western Cemetery in Stahnsdorf. The high school location was filmed at the Reinfelder Schule in Berlin's Charlottenburg-Wilmersdorf neighbourhood. The bridge and the train tracks were filmed on the abandoned Wannsee-Stahnsdorf railway in the middle of the Düppeler forest near Lake Wannsee. The gates to the power plant are those at the Olympic Stadium Bell Tower; the nuclear reactor towers were computer-animated. The recurring street scene of the bus stop and T-intersection was filmed at Fahrtechnik Akademie in Zossen. The truck stop with Benni's caravan is located at Zollamt Berlin-Dreilinden (the former Checkpoint Bravo). Exterior hospital shots were filmed at the old section of Lungenklinik Heckeshorn in Wannsee. Library scenes were filmed at the University of Applied Sciences for Finance in Königs Wusterhausen and Berlin State Library.

The series was filmed in 4K (Ultra HD) resolution. It is the first German-language Netflix original series and follows a trend of internationally produced Netflix originals, including the Mexican series Club de Cuervos in 2015, the Brazilian series 3% in 2016, the Italian series Suburra: Blood on Rome in 2017, and the Indian series Sacred Games in 2018.

Principal photography for the second season took place on location in Berlin from June 2018 until November 2018.

Filming for the third season began in May 2019 and wrapped in December 2019.

== Music ==
=== Season 1 ===
Dark: Cycle 1 (Original Music from the Netflix Series)

Soundtrack album by Ben Frost
- Released: 28 June 2019
- Genres: Dark ambient; orchestral; minimal
- Length: 40:50
- Labels: Invada Records UK; Lakeshore Records
- Producer: Ben Frost

==== Track listing ====
Dark: Cycle 1 (Original Music from the Netflix Series)
| No. | Title | Length |
|---|---|---|
| 1. | "Alles ist miteinander verbunden" | 2:36 |
| 2. | "Ein Mensch – Ein Schmetterling" | 2:02 |
| 3. | "Die Hölle ist leer, alle Teufel sind hier" | 5:04 |
| 4. | "Tick tack, tick tack" | 2:52 |
| 5. | "Warum nicht Waldweg" | 2:12 |
| 6. | "Apokalypse" | 3:31 |
| 7. | "Kein DeLorean" | 2:52 |
| 8. | "Das ist nicht Mikkel" | 2:30 |
| 9. | "Eine Reise durch die Zeit" | 2:32 |
| 10. | "Ich kann die Vergangenheit ändern" | 2:08 |
| 11. | "Gott gib mir Gelassenheit" | 2:52 |
| 12. | "Wo ist Übergang" | 9:39 |
| Total length: | | 40:50 |

=== Season 2 ===
Dark: Cycle 2 (Original Music from the Netflix Series)

Soundtrack album by Ben Frost
- Released: 16 August 2019
- Genres: Dark ambient; orchestral; minimal
- Length: 46:03
- Labels: Invada Records UK; Lakeshore Records
- Producer: Ben Frost

==== Track listing ====
Dark: Cycle 2 (Original Music from the Netflix Series)
| No. | Title | Length |
|---|---|---|
| 1. | "Schwarze Materie" | 2:58 |
| 2. | "Winden 2053" | 2:40 |
| 3. | "Bootstrap" | 5:04 |
| 4. | "Alles in einer endlosen Schleife" | 1:57 |
| 5. | "Die Reisenden 1" | 3:11 |
| 6. | "Du bist ein so guter Mensch" | 5:02 |
| 7. | "Jeder bekommt was er verdient" | 2:24 |
| 8. | "Die Apokalypse muss kommen" | 3:06 |
| 9. | "Wir Haben keine Zeit mehr" | 4:43 |
| 10. | "Die Reisenden 2" | 2:45 |
| 11. | "Ich dachte, ich hätte mehr Zeit" | 5:32 |
| 12. | "Folge dem Signal" | 3:03 |
| 13. | "Der Weiße Teufel" | 3:38 |
| Total length: | | 46:03 |

=== Season 3 ===
Dark: Cycle 3 (Music from the Netflix Original Series)

Soundtrack album by Ben Frost
- Released: 24 July 2020
- Genres: Dark ambient; orchestral; minimal
- Length: 46:57
- Labels: Invada Records UK; Lakeshore Records
- Producer: Ben Frost

==== Track listing ====
Dark: Cycle 3 (Music from the Netflix Original Series)
| No. | Title | Length |
|---|---|---|
| 1. | "Origin" | 2:11 |
| 2. | "Bevor Alles Wieder Passiert" | 2:16 |
| 3. | "Ein Tropfen – Ein Ozean" | 2:40 |
| 4. | "Die Welt Geht Heute Unter" | 3:43 |
| 5. | "Nicht Deine Martha" | 1:37 |
| 6. | "Du Lebst" | 1:57 |
| 7. | "Anderer Mensch – Anderer Schmetterling" | 1:35 |
| 8. | "Wenn Alles Gelingt, Wird Sie Leben" | 3:25 |
| 9. | "Eva" | 4:56 |
| 10. | "Franziska & Magnus" | 3:05 |
| 11. | "Anderes Winden 2052" | 5:10 |
| 12. | "Leben Und Tod" | 2:46 |
| 13. | "Higgs Field" | 4:24 |
| 14. | "Ob Irgendwas Von Uns Bleibt" | 3:18 |
| 15. | "Der Letzte Zyklus" | 3:54 |
| Total length: | | 46:57 |

=== Pre-released songs ===
Apart from the score, numerous pre-released songs were also used throughout the series. The song "Goodbye" by Apparat in collaboration with Soap&Skin was used as the opening theme for the episodes. Songs by the vocal ensemble Roomful of Teeth were also heavily featured on multiple episodes; the third movement of Caroline Shaw's Partita for 8 Voices was featured prominently in season one, and Alev Lenz's "May the Angels", also featuring Roomful of Teeth, was used in the season two episode five, "Lost and Found". The series finale features Soap&Skin's cover of "What a Wonderful World" and Nena's "Irgendwie, irgendwo, irgendwann", the latter of which is played over the end credits to close out the series.

== Release ==
The first season of the series was released on 1 December 2017.

A second season was announced with a short teaser on the German Facebook pages of the series and Netflix on 20 December 2017. On 26 April 2019, a second season was announced which was released on 21 June 2019.

On 26 May 2020, a third and final season was announced, which was released on 27 June 2020.

== Reception ==
=== Critical response ===
Critical response of Dark
| Season | Rotten Tomatoes | Metacritic |
|---|---|---|
| 1 | 90% (48 reviews) | 61 (10 reviews) |
| 2 | 100% (30 reviews) | 82 (4 reviews) |
| 3 | 97% (35 reviews) | 92 (4 reviews) |

Dark received critical acclaim and has been listed by many publications as one of the best TV shows of the years 2017, 2019, and 2020, as well as of the 2010s, 21st century, and of all time. Vulture included the series in its article A Guide to TV Shows in the 2010s as one of the most notable shows of the decade. The BBC ranked it the 58th best TV series of the 21st century. Meanwhile, BuzzFeed listed it as one of the 25 best TV shows of all time.

==== Season 1 ====
The first season of Dark received mostly positive reviews from critics, with many noting its similarities to the TV series Twin Peaks and another Netflix series Stranger Things. The review aggregator website Rotten Tomatoes gave the first season an approval rating of 90%, with an average rating of 7.4 out of 10, based on 48 critics. The website's critical consensus is "Dark's central mystery unfolds slowly, both tense and terrifying, culminating in a creepy, cinematic triumph of sci-fi noir." Metacritic, which assigns a weighted average score out of 100 to reviews and ratings from mainstream publications, gave it a score of 61, based on ten reviews.

Writing for The Guardian, Lanre Bakare gave Dark a rating of four out of five and praised the series for its tone, the complexity of its narrative, and its pacing. Grading the series with a "B", Steve Greene of IndieWire wrote, "Even when Dark is clinical in its set-up of these interweaving story threads, there's still an incredible amount of energy coursing through the show." From Vox, Emily St. James gave it a score of three and a half out of five and said, "Dark is fun to try to solve — it's a treat to tease out the many connections running among the three eras. It's just that at a certain point, it becomes difficult to care about what's happening, beyond simply wanting to figure out how everything is connected." Ariana Romero of Refinery29 noted that the series was darker and more in-depth than Stranger Things. However, there was some criticism by Reason's Glenn Garvin for a heavy-handed approach to its message, a lack of sympathetic characters, and unoriginality of certain aspects of the series.

Los Angeles Times listed Dark as one of the best TV series of 2017, while Thrillist named it the 18th best TV show of the year.

==== Season 2 ====
The second season received critical acclaim. On Metacritic, it received a score of 82 out of 100, based on four reviews. At Rotten Tomatoes, season two of the series holds an approval rating of 100% based on 30 reviews, with an average rating of 8.1 out of 10. The website's critical consensus states, "Dark's sumptuous second season descends deeper into the show's meticulously-crafted mythos and cements the series as one of streaming's strongest and strangest science fiction stories."

Critics referred to season two as ominous and much more bizarre than season one, and that the series managed to subvert several tropes regarding the concepts of time travel. The season received a rating of four out of five from Jack Seale of The Guardian and Boyd Hilton of Empire, a B+ grade from Hanh Nguyen of IndieWire, and an "amazing" score of 9 out of 10 from David Griffin of IGN. The latter wrote in his verdict: "Dark Season 2 can hurt your brain at times, trying to piece all the time-traveling narratives together, but in the end, creators Baran bo Odar and Jantje Friese reward your patience with some stellar WTF moments. At eight episodes in length, [it] is a tightly-woven tapestry of compelling stories and memorable performances from the entire ensemble." TV Guide's Kaitlin Thomas was also favorably inclined towards the season, saying that "one of the reasons Dark is such a compelling drama isn't just because it presents time travel as something that is possible or because it grounds its story in the emotional narratives of its characters, but because it couches its sci-fi themes in conversations about free will and destiny. [...] [It] excels at building a compelling mystery, and the fact that it never loses the plot itself is a testament to the writing of the series."

The season was included in many critics' year-end lists of 2019. It was ranked as the ninth and tenth best TV show of the year by Maggie Fremont of ScreenCrush and John Sellers of Thrillist, respectively. Outside the top ten, TV Guide and Complex named it the 12th and 26th best TV show of the year in their respective lists. In addition, CNET and Vogue also listed it on each unranked list.

==== Season 3 ====
The third and final season received critical acclaim, with the series finale receiving particular praise for being a satisfying conclusion to the story. It received a Rotten Tomatoes approval rating of 97% based on 35 reviews, with an average rating of 8.5 out of 10. The site's critical consensus says, "Dark's final chapter is as thrilling as it is bewildering, bringing viewers full circle without sacrificing any of the show's narrative complexities." At Metacritic, the season received an average score of 92, based on four reviews.

The season received a rating of five out of five from Radio Times's Patrick Cremona and four out of five from The Guardian's Jack Seale, an A− grade from IndieWire's Steve Greene, and an "amazing" nine out of ten from IGN's David Griffin. Cremona deemed it as "science fiction at its most mesmerising, its most confounding and its most exhilarating - and it all makes for a truly irresistible piece of television" and further praised the writing, cinematography, casting, and acting (particularly that of Louis Hofmann, Maja Schöne, and Lisa Vicari). Griffin wrote in his verdict, "Dark's third and final season on Netflix is a memorable journey through time and space, with thrilling character shifts and fascinating paradoxes to unpack." William Goodman of Complex praised the ending, saying, "Odar and Friese masterfully close by showing the symbiotic relationship between endings and beginnings. There's no victory without sacrifice, no light without darkness, and no love without loss. The tension between each of these conflicting ideas is so interwoven, making it hard to discern where one ends and the other begins. And so Dark concludes not with a hard endpoint on a line, but by elegantly and satisfyingly circling back into itself."

The season was listed by many publications as one of the best TV shows of 2020. Radio Times named it the eighth best TV show of the year, with one of the website's writers Patrick Cremona saying, "The final series was another irresistible piece of sci-fi television, equal parts mesmerising and confounding, with a sweeping scope that gave it the sense of a true epic. With its exhilarating finale, Dark has earned its place among the list of the very best original series made for the streamer." Exclaim! ranked it the tenth best TV series of the year. The website's Allie Gregory wrote, "With stunning performances from Louis Hoffman, Oliver Masucci and Karoline Eichhorn (and an incredible score to boot), the apocalyptic time travel sci-fi series deftly concludes its mind-bending journey in its darkest (and Dark-est) instalment yet. [...] [It] manages to neatly tie up all of its loose ends to finally find the one true "origin," so, at last, the town of Winden can free itself from the trappings of time and fate." GameSpot listed it as one of the year's ten best TV shows, with one of its writers Mike Rougeau stating, "what really impressed us about Season 3 is how it wrapped things up, even while continuing the tradition of adding yet another new dimension (so to speak) to the show's tangled timelines. It managed to weave one of the most complex, but somehow still cohesive, sci-fi stories we've ever seen." Outside the top ten, Den of Geek named it the 17th best TV show of 2020. Meanwhile, Thrillist ranked it at number 19 on its "40 Best TV Shows of 2020" list, with one of its writers Emma Stefansky calling the series finale "one of the most shocking and emotional conclusions to a TV show you'll see this year."

=== Awards and nominations ===
The series was nominated for the Goldene Kamera TV awards 2018 in three categories: best series; best actress for Karoline Eichhorn as Charlotte Doppler; and best actor for Oliver Masucci as Ulrich Nielsen. None of these nominations resulted in awards, but Louis Hofmann received the "Best Newcomer" award in recognition of his lead role in Dark as well as his performances in several films.

The series was awarded the 2018 Grimme-Preis award in the category "Fiction", which singled out the following cast and crew for awards:

1. Jantje Friese (screenplay)
2. Baran bo Odar (director)
3. Udo Kramer (production design)
4. Simone Bär (casting)
5. Angela Winkler (actress)
6. Louis Hofmann (actor)
7. Oliver Masucci (actor)

The actors named are awarded as "representatives for the full cast".

== See also ==
- Bootstrap paradox
- Dark matter
- Emerald Tablet
- Grandfather paradox
- Higgs boson
- Schrödinger's cat
- Self-fulfilling prophecy
- Einstein-Rosen Bridge
- Triquetra
