= Baran bo Odar =

German film and television director (born 1978)

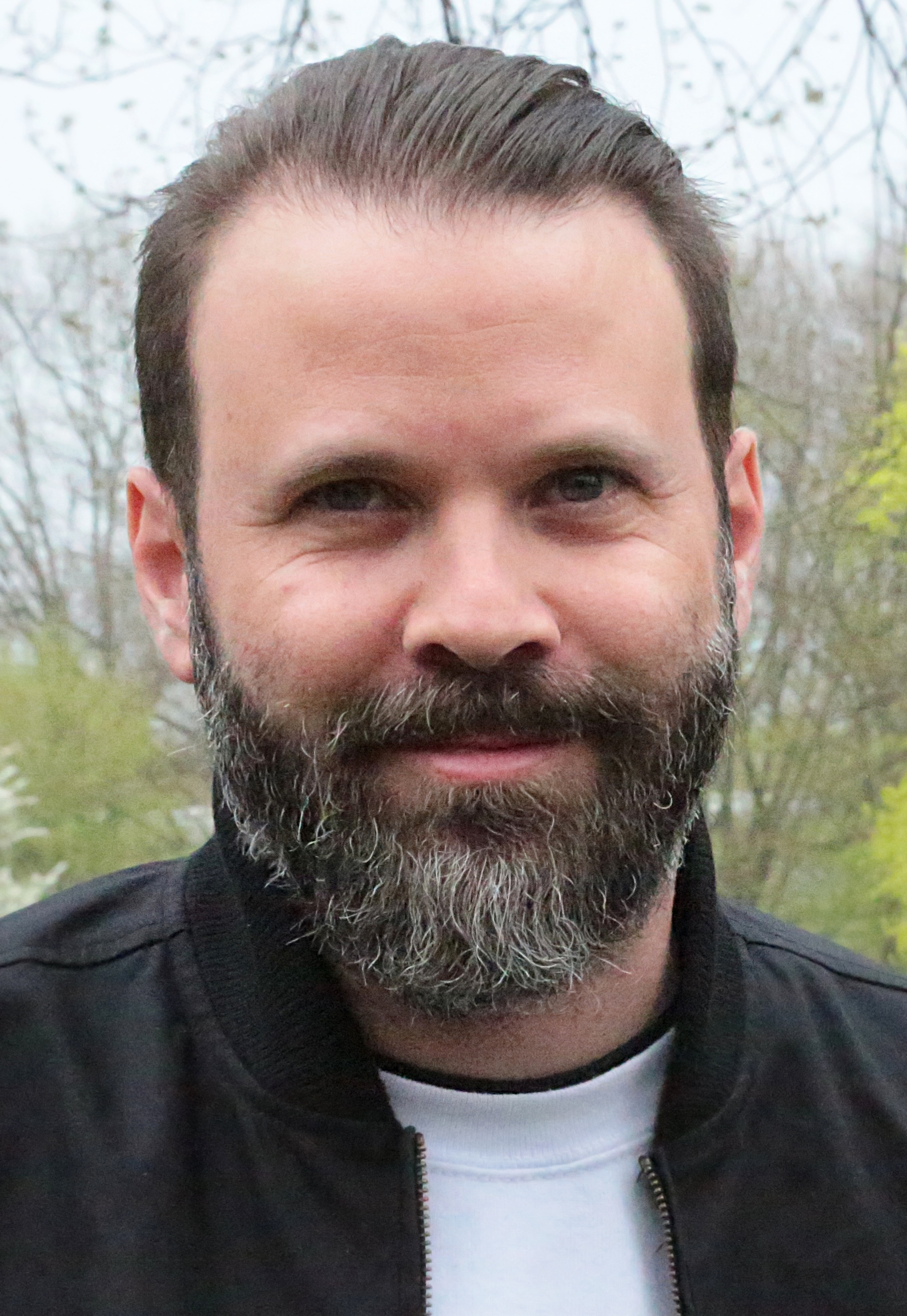
- Odar in 2018
- Born: 18 April 1978 (age 48); Olten, Solothurn, Switzerland
- Occupations: Film and television director
- Years active: 2005–present
- Known for: Who Am I Dark; 1899
- Partner: Jantje Friese
- Website: baranboodar.com

Baran bo Odar (born 18 April 1978) is a German film and television director and screenwriter. He is known for co-creating the Netflix series Dark (2017–2020) and 1899 (2022) with his creative and romantic partner, Jantje Friese.

His film Who Am I reached the top of the German cinema charts and was nominated for a German Film Award for Best Fiction Feature Film and Best Screenplay in 2015. Odar directed and co-wrote the film with Friese.

== Early life ==
Odar was born in Switzerland. He is of Turkish descent on his mother's side and has Russian ancestry from his paternal grandfather, a former doctor who fled Russia after the October Revolution.

== Career ==
Odar's first feature film, produced as a final project for his University of Television and Film Munich diploma, was Under the Sun (German: Unter Der Sonne), a sixty-minute coming-of-age story about a twelve-year-old boy who is infatuated with his older niece. It was screened at the Montreal World Film Festival in 2006 and Utah's Slamdance in 2007. For the film, Odar was awarded the Studio Hamburg Newcomer Award and the Munich Feature Film Award and was nominated for the Max Ophüls Prize.

Directing a Hollywood production had been a longtime dream of Odar's. Following the success in Germany of The Silence and Who Am I, Odar attracted the attention of American producers who were searching for a director for Sleepless, an action thriller to which Jamie Foxx was already attached. After Odar came on board, Michelle Monaghan was cast as Foxx's co-star, and the film was shot in Atlanta.

The TV series Dark, which Odar co-created with Friese, gained popularity worldwide and was Netflix's first German-language original series. Every episode was co-written by Friese and directed by Odar. Odar was honored with a Grimme-Preis, Germany's most prestigious television award, in 2018 for his direction of Dark's first season. In 2019, the second season of Dark was released. The third, and final, season followed in 2020.

Prior to the release of season 3 of Dark, Odar and Friese announced their next series, 1899. The first two episodes premiered at the Toronto International Film Festival in September 2022. The full season came out on 17 November 2022 on Netflix. The creators had ideas for two more seasons, but in January 2023, Netflix canceled the show.

== Selected filmography ==
Year	Title	Notes
2010	The Silence	Film
2014	Who Am I	Film
2017	Sleepless	Film
2017–2020	Dark	TV series
2022	1899	TV series
TBA	Tyll	TV series
