= Jantje Friese =

German film producer and screenwriter (born 1977)

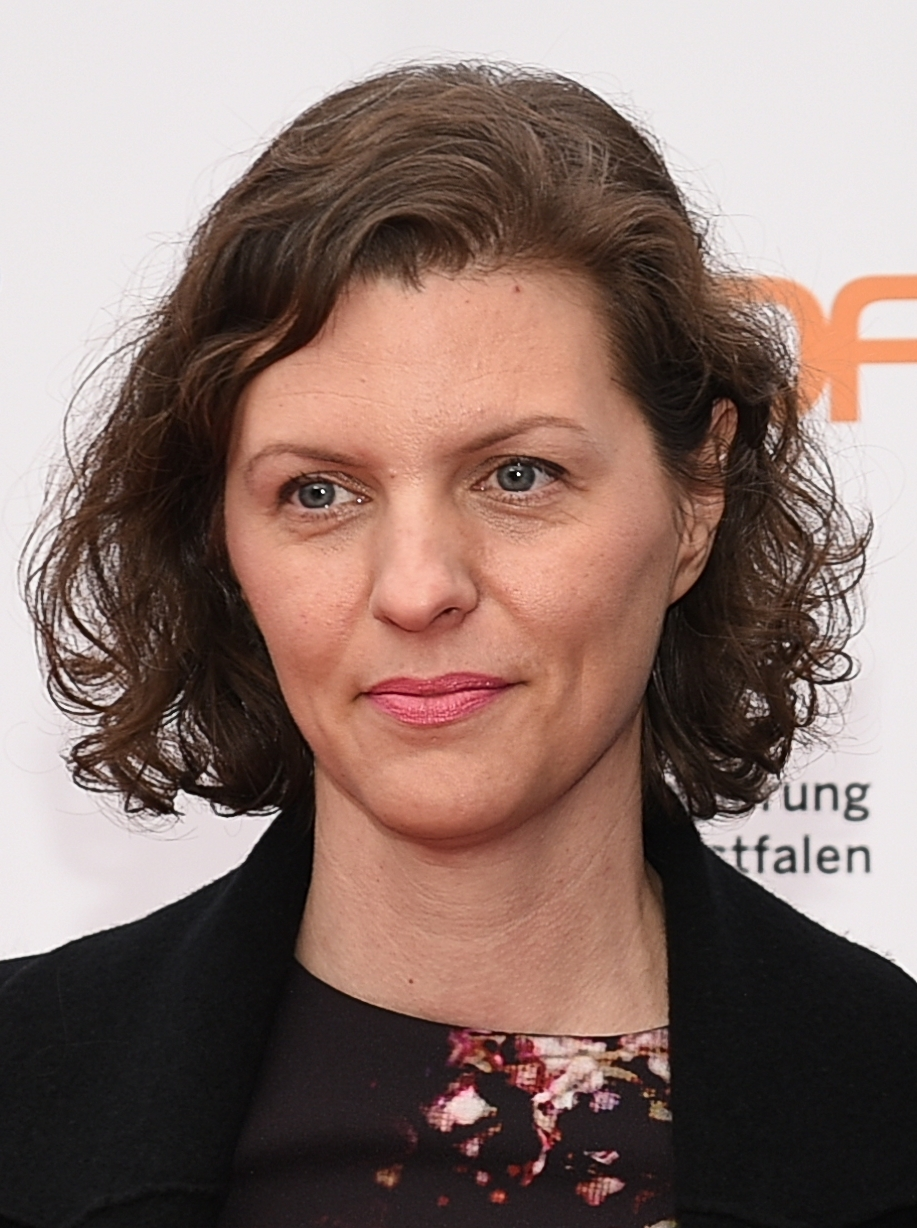
- Friese at the Grimme-Preis in 2018
- Born: 1977 (age 48–49); Marburg, Hesse, West Germany
- Occupations: Film producer Screenwriter
- Years active: 2005–present
- Known for: Who Am I Dark; 1899
- Partner: Baran bo Odar

Jantje Friese (born 1977) is a German film producer and screenwriter known for co-creating the Netflix series Dark (2017–2020) and 1899 (2022) with her creative and romantic partner Baran bo Odar.

== Work ==
Jantje Friese studied production and media management at the University of Television and Film Munich. After graduating, she worked as a producer for Made in Munich Film Production and Neue Sentimental Film Berlin. In 2010 she was the production manager of the feature film The Silence with her partner Baran bo Odar.

With Odar, she wrote the screenplay for Who Am I – No System Is Safe (2014), which was directed by Odar. Her screenplay was nominated for Best Screenplay at the German Film Award 2015.

Through this film, Netflix became aware of Friese and Odar and offered both to make a series based on the film. Instead, Friese and Odar jointly developed the first German Netflix series, Dark, which premiered on 1 December 2017. In 2018, Friese was honored with a Grimme-Preis, Germany's most prestigious television award, for her writing on Dark season 1. On 21 June 2019, Dark season 2 was released and renewed for a third season, which was released on 27 June 2020.

Prior to the release of Dark season 3, Friese and Odar announced their next series, 1899. The first two episodes premiered at the Toronto International Film Festival in September 2022. The full season released on 17 November 2022 on Netflix. The creators had ideas for two more seasons, but in January 2023 the show was canceled.

== Selected filmography ==
Year	Title	Notes
2014	Who Am I – No System Is Safe	
2017–2020	Dark	TV series
2022	1899	TV series
TBA	TYLL	TV series
