= Mehringhof =

German building complex for alternative activities

Coordinates: 52°29′33″N 13°23′19″E

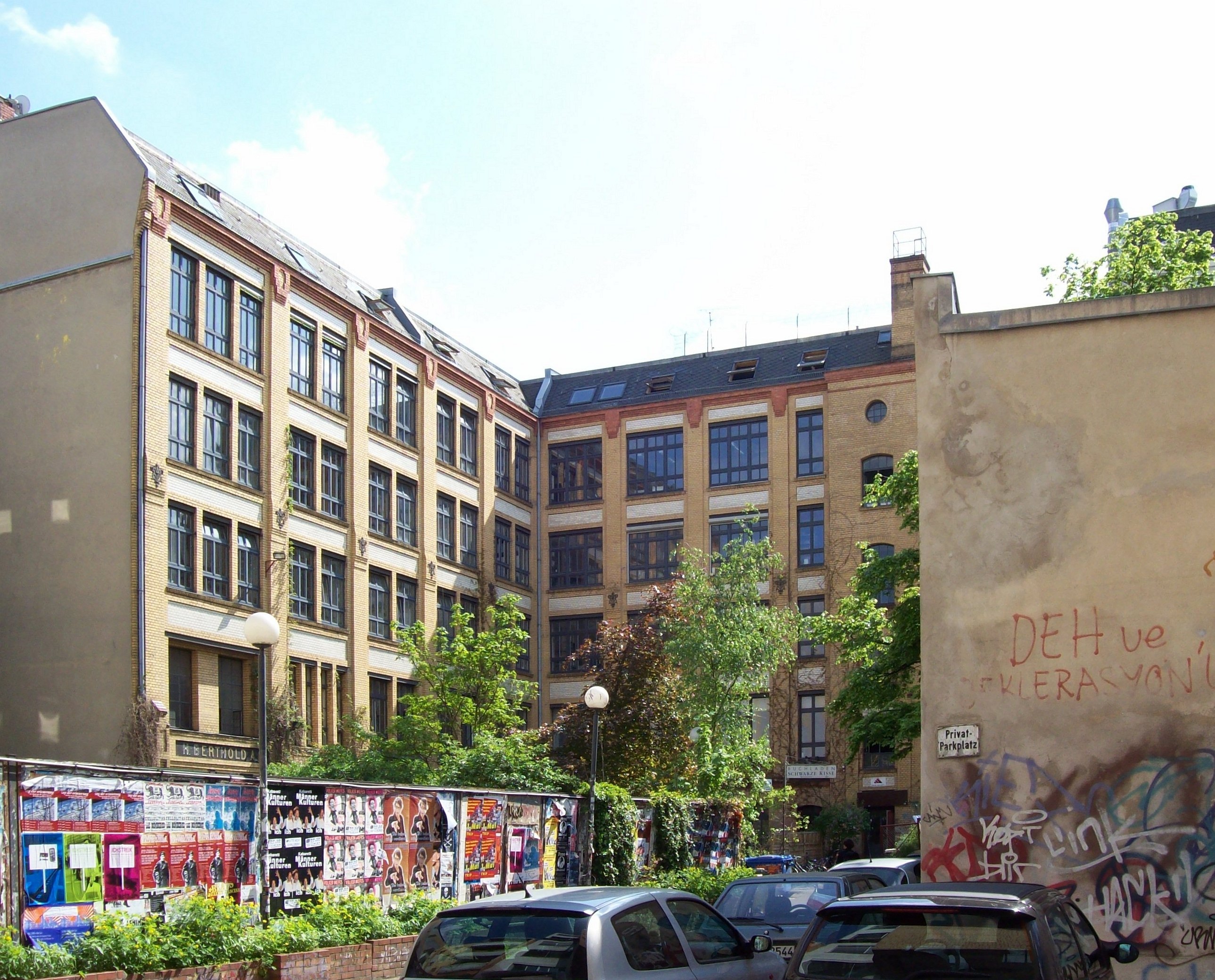
Mehringhof first courtyard, 2008

Mehringhof is a socialized building complex in Kreuzberg, Berlin, designed as a center for alternative activities. As of 1991, it hosted 38 projects, including a theater, an electronics collective (Wuseltronick), a printing collective, and a school for adults.

== Administration ==
In 1978, anonymous benefactors donated DM 2 million to purchase the Mehringhof factory complex in Kreuzberg to build a center for alternative activities. Mehringhof incorporated as a limited liability GmbH without named owners and was governed by an assembly of tenants who paid maintenance rent. This group decided on new tenants, changes in rent, and handling maintenance.

== Bibliography ==
- Müller, Birgit (1991). Toward an Alternative Culture of Work: Political Idealism and Economic Practices in West Berlin Collective Enterprises. Westview Press. ISBN 0-8133-8079-0.
