= List of Austrian films of the 2020s =

A list of films produced in the Cinema of Austria in the 2020s ordered by year of release. For an alphabetical list of articles on Austrian films see Category:Austrian films.

Year	Title	Genre	Director	Cast	Studio	Notes
2020	3freunde2feinde	Drama/Comedy	Sebastian Brauneis			
2020	Epicentro	Documentary	Hubert Sauper	Groupe Deux, KGP Films, Little Magnet Films		
2020	Hochwald	Drama	Evi Romen	Thomas Prenn, Noah Saavedra		
2020	Nevrland	Drama	Gregor Schmidinger	Simon Frühwirth, Paul Forman	Orbrock Filmproduktion	Won Film Festival Max Ophüls Prize
2020	Once Upon a Time in Venezuela	Documentary	Anabel Rodríguez			
2020	What We Wanted	Drama	Ulrike Kofler	Lavinia Wilson, Elyas M'Barek, Anna Unterberger, Lukas Spisser		Released by Netflix

Year	Title	Genre	Director	Cast	Studio	Notes
2021	1 Verabredung im Herbst	Drama/Comedy	Sebastian Brauneis			
2021	Masking Threshold	Horror/Drama	Johannes Grenzfurthner		monochrom	
2021	Hinterland	Thriller	Stefan Ruzowitzky	Murathan Muslu, Liv Lisa Fries, Max von der Groeben, Marc Limpach		
2021	Luzifer	Horror	Peter Brunner	Susanne Jensen, Franz Rogowski		

Year	Title	Genre	Director	Cast	Studio	Notes
2022	Rimini	Drama	Ulrich Seidl	Michael Thomas	Ulrich Seidl Filmproduktion	
2022	Sonne	Drama	Kurdwin Ayub	Melina Benli, Law Wallner, Maya Wopienka	Ulrich Seidl Filmproduktion	Won best direction at Internationale Filmfestspiele Berlin, Sektion Encounters
2022	Family Dinner	Horror/Thriller/Mystery	Peter Hengl	Pia Hierzegger, Nina Katlein, Michael Pink, Alexander Sladek	Capra Film	
2022	Corsage	Drama	Marie Kreutzer	Vicky Krieps	Film AG	
2022	Razzennest	Horror/Comedy	Johannes Grenzfurthner		monochrom	

Year	Title	Genre	Director	Cast	Studio	Notes
2023	Die Vermieterin	Drama/Comedy	Sebastian Brauneis			
Sisi & I	Biography/Drama	Frauke Finsterwalder	Susanne Wolff, Sandra Hüller	Dor Film	Germany-Swiss-Austrian coproduction	
2023	Feminism WTF	Documentary	Katharina Mückstein		La Banda Film, Nikolaus Geyrhalter Filmproduktion	
2023	Club Zero	Drama	Jessica Hausner	Mia Wasikowska, Sidse Babett Knudsen		
2023	Ingeborg Bachmann – Journey into the Desert	Drama	Margarethe von Trotta	Vicky Krieps, Ronald Zehrfeld		
2023	The Universal Theory	Thriller	Timm Kröger	Jan Bülow, Olivia Ross, Hanns Zischler, David Bennent		
2023	All Will Be Revealed	Drama	Peter Keglevic	Harald Schrott, Erika Marozsán, August Schmölzer, Manuel Rubey, Robert Stadlober		

Year	Title	Genre	Director	Cast	Studio	Notes
2024	Andrea Gets a Divorce	Drama	Josef Hader	Birgit Minichmayr, Josef Hader	Vega film, Golden Girls film	Berlinale Panorama
2024	The Devil's Bath	Horror/Drama	Veronika Franz and Severin Fiala	Anja Plaschg	Ulrich Seidl film production, Heimatfilm	Main Competition
2024	Veni Vidi Vici	Comedy/Crime	Daniel Hoesl and Julia Niemann	Laurence Rupp, Ursina Lardi	Ulrich Seidl film production	
2024	Hacking at Leaves	Documentary	Johannes Grenzfurthner		monochrom	

Year	Title	Genre	Director	Cast	Studio	Notes
2025	How to Be Normal and the Oddness of the Other World	Drama	Florian Pochlatko	Luisa-Céline Gaffron, Elke Winkens, Cornelius Obonya, Felix Pöchhacker	Golden Girls Film Production	Selected in Perspectives at the 75th Berlin International Film Festival and will be screened in February 2025.
2025	If You Are Afraid You Put Your Heart into Your Mouth and Smile	Coming-of-age/Drama	Marie Luise Lehner	Siena Popović, Mariya Menner, Jessica Paar, Alessandro Scheibner, Alperen Köse, Kathrin Resetarits, Daniel Sea	Nikolaus Geyrhalter Filmproduktion	Winner - Teddy Award - Jury Award at the 75th Berlin International Film Festival Winner - CICAE Art Cinema Award in the Forum section at the 75th Berlin International Film Festival Winner - Thomas Pluch Screenplay Prize at the 28th Diagonale Winner - Special Jury Prize at the 28th Diagonale Winner - Award Local Artist for Young Talent at the 22nd Crossing Europe Film Festival
2025	White Snail	Romance	Elsa Kremser, Levin Peter	Marya Imbro, and Mikhail Senkov	Panama Film	The film will have its world premiere in the main competition of the 78th Locarno Film Festival on 8 August 2025, where it was nominated for the Golden Leopard
2025	To Live and Survive	Documentary	Matthias Jaklitsch	Erich Finsches, Matthias Jaklitsch	monochrom	
2026	Gentle Monster	Drama	Marie Kreutzer	Léa Seydoux, Jella Haase, Laurence Rupp, Catherine Deneuve	Film AG	
