= List of awards and nominations received by Sandra Hüller =

Sandra Hüller awards and nominations
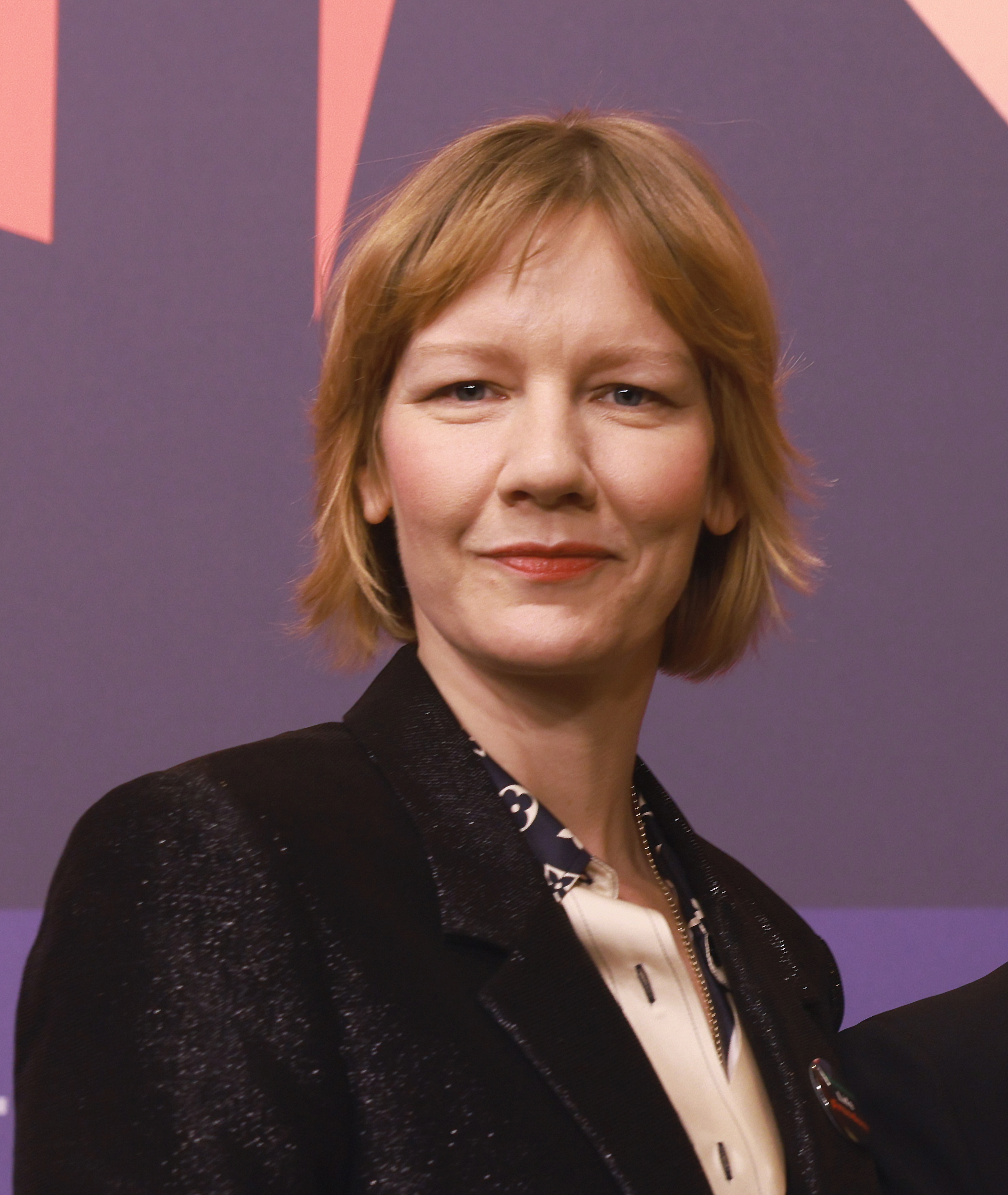
- Hüller in 2023
Awards and nominations
Award	Wins	Nominations
Academy Awards	0	1
BAFTA Awards	0	2
César Awards	1	1
Critics' Choice Awards	0	2
European Film Awards	2	6
Golden Globe Awards	0	1

Totals (Note: Certain award groups do not simply award one winner. They acknowledge several different recipients, have runners-up, and have third place. Since this is a specific recognition and is different from losing an award, runner-up mentions are considered wins in this award tally. For simplification and to avoid errors, each award in this list has been presumed to have had a prior nomination.)
- Wins: 43
- Nominations: 97

The following is a list of awards and nominations received by German actress Sandra Hüller. In 2024, Hüller became the third German actress to be nominated for an Academy Award for Best Actress, for her performance in Anatomy of a Fall (2023).

== Major associations ==
=== Academy Awards ===
Year	Category	Nominated work	Result	Ref.
2024	Best Actress	Anatomy of a Fall	Nominated	

=== BAFTA Awards ===
Year	Category	Nominated work	Result	Ref.
British Academy Film Awards
2024	Best Actress in a Leading Role	Anatomy of a Fall	Nominated	
2024	Best Actress in a Supporting Role	The Zone of Interest	Nominated	

=== César Awards ===
Year	Category	Nominated work	Result	Ref.
2024	Best Actress	Anatomy of a Fall	Won	

=== Critics' Choice Awards ===
Year	Category	Nominated work	Result	Ref.
Critics' Choice Movie Awards
2024	Best Actress	Anatomy of a Fall	Nominated	
Critics' Choice Super Awards
2026	Best Actress in a Science Fiction/Fantasy Movie	Project Hail Mary	Nominated	

=== European Film Awards ===
Year	Category	Nominated work	Result	Ref.
2006	European Actress	Requiem	Nominated	
2016	European Actress	Toni Erdmann	Won	
2023	European Actress	Anatomy of a Fall	Won	
2023	European Actress	The Zone of Interest	Nominated	
2027	European Actress	Fatherland	Pending	
2027	European Actress	Rose	Pending	

=== Golden Globe Awards ===
Year	Category	Nominated work	Result	Ref.
2024	Best Actress in a Motion Picture – Drama	Anatomy of a Fall	Nominated	

== Film festival awards ==
Year	Nominated work	Festival	Category	Result	Ref.
2006	Requiem	Berlin International Film Festival	Silver Bear for Best Actress	Won	
2006	Requiem	Sitges Film Festival	Best Actress	Won	
2007	Madonnas	Mar del Plata Film Festival	Best Actress	Won	
2011	Above Us Only Sky	Saint-Jean-de-Luz International Film Festival	Best Actress	Won	
2011	Above Us Only Sky	Festival 2 Cinéma de Valenciennes	Best Actress	Won	
2018	Toni Erdmann	SESC Film Festival	Best Foreign Actress	Won	
2023	Anatomy of a Fall / The Zone of Interest	Capri Hollywood International Film Festival	Best European Actress	Won	
2023	—N/a	Filmfest Hamburg	Douglas Sirk Prize	Won	
2026	Rose	Berlin International Film Festival	Silver Bear for Best Leading Performance	Won	

== Film critics awards ==
Year	Nominated work	Association	Category	Result	Ref.
2006	Requiem	German Film Critics Award	Best Actress	Won	
2011	Above Us Only Sky	German Film Critics Award	Best Actress	Won	
2016	Toni Erdmann	Toronto Film Critics Association Awards	Best Actress	Won	
2017	Toni Erdmann	London Critics Circle Film Awards	Actress of the Year	Nominated	
2017	Toni Erdmann	National Society of Film Critics Awards	Best Actress	Nominated	
2017	Toni Erdmann	German Film Critics Award	Best Actress	Nominated	
2023	The Zone of Interest	Alliance of Women Film Journalists	Best Actress in a Supporting Role	Nominated	
2023	The Zone of Interest	Alliance of Women Film Journalists	Most Daring Performance	Nominated	
2023	The Zone of Interest	London Film Critics' Circle	Supporting Actress of the Year	Nominated	
2023	The Zone of Interest	Chicago Film Critics Association	Best Supporting Actress	Nominated	
2023	The Zone of Interest	Los Angeles Film Critics Association Awards	Best Lead Performance	Won	
2023	The Zone of Interest	San Diego Film Critics Society	Best Supporting Actress	Nominated	
2023	The Zone of Interest	National Society of Film Critics Awards	Best Actress	Won	
2023	The Zone of Interest	North Dakota Film Society	Best Supporting Actress	Nominated	
2023	The Zone of Interest	San Francisco Bay Area Film Critics Circle	Best Supporting Actress	Nominated	
2023	The Zone of Interest	Seattle Film Critics Society	Best Actress in a Supporting Role	Nominated	
2023	The Zone of Interest	Utah Film Critics Association	Best Supporting Performance, Female	Nominated	
2023	Anatomy of a Fall	Chicago Film Critics Association	Best Actress	Nominated	
2023	Anatomy of a Fall	Dallas–Fort Worth Film Critics Association	Best Actress	Nominated	
2023	Anatomy of a Fall	Dublin Film Critics' Circle	Best Actress	Nominated	
2023	Anatomy of a Fall	Florida Film Critics Circle	Best Actress	Runner-up (Note: Tied with Emma Stone for Poor Things.)	
2023	Anatomy of a Fall	Los Angeles Film Critics Association Awards	Best Lead Performance	Won (Note: Shared with Emma Stone for Poor Things.)	
2023	Anatomy of a Fall	Michigan Movie Critics Guild Awards	Best Actress	Nominated	
2023	Anatomy of a Fall	Michigan Movie Critics Guild Awards	Best Breakthrough	Nominated	
2023	Anatomy of a Fall	New York Film Critics Online	Best Actress	Won	
2023	Anatomy of a Fall	Online Association of Female Film Critics	Best Female Lead	Nominated	
2023	Anatomy of a Fall	Phoenix Critics Circle	Best Actress	Nominated	
2023	Anatomy of a Fall	San Diego Film Critics Society	Best Actress	Nominated	
2023	Anatomy of a Fall	Toronto Film Critics Association Awards	Outstanding Lead Performance	Won (Note: Shared with Lily Gladstone for Killers of the Flower Moon.)	
2023	Anatomy of a Fall	Boston Society of Film Critics Awards	Best Actress	Runner-up (Note: Shared with Emma Stone for Poor Things and Natalie Portman for May December.)	
2023	Anatomy of a Fall	UK Film Critics Association Awards	Best Actress	Nominated	
2024	Anatomy of a Fall	Alliance of Women Film Journalists	Best Actress	Nominated	
2024	Anatomy of a Fall	Alliance of Women Film Journalists	Most Daring Performance	Nominated	
2024	Anatomy of a Fall	Astra Film and Creative Arts Awards	Best International Actress	Won	
2024	Anatomy of a Fall	Austin Film Critics Association	Best Actress	Nominated	
2024	Anatomy of a Fall	Chicago Indie Critics Awards	Best Actress	Nominated	
2024	Anatomy of a Fall	Columbus Film Critics Association	Actor of the Year	Won	
2024	Anatomy of a Fall	DiscussingFilm Critic Awards	Best Actress	Nominated	
2024	Anatomy of a Fall	Georgia Film Critics Association	Best Actress	Nominated	
2024	Anatomy of a Fall	Greater Western New York Film Critics Association Awards	Best Actress	Nominated	
2024	Anatomy of a Fall	Latino Entertainment Journalists Association	Best Actress	Nominated	
2024	Anatomy of a Fall	London Film Critics' Circle	Actress of the Year	Nominated	
2024	Anatomy of a Fall	Music City Film Critics' Association Awards	Best Actress	Won	
2024	Anatomy of a Fall	National Society of Film Critics Awards	Best Actress	Won	
2024	Anatomy of a Fall	New Mexico Film Critics Awards	Best Actress	Won	
2024	Anatomy of a Fall	North Carolina Film Critics Association	Best Actress	Nominated	
2024	Anatomy of a Fall	North Dakota Film Society	Best Actress	Nominated	
2024	Anatomy of a Fall	Oklahoma Film Critics Circle Awards	Best Body of Work	Won	
2024	Anatomy of a Fall	Online Film Critics Society	Best Lead Actress	Nominated	
2024	Anatomy of a Fall	Paris Film Critics Association Awards	Best Actress	Won	
2024	Anatomy of a Fall	Portland Critics Association	Best Actress	Nominated	
2024	Anatomy of a Fall	San Francisco Bay Area Film Critics Circle	Best Actress	Nominated	
2024	Anatomy of a Fall	Seattle Film Critics Society	Best Lead Actress	Nominated	
2024	Anatomy of a Fall	Dorian Awards	Film Performance of the Year	Nominated	
2025	Project Hail Mary	Astra Midseason Movie Awards	Best Supporting Actress	Runner-up	

== Theatre awards ==
Year	Association	Nominated work	Category	Result	Ref.
2003	Theater heute	Romeo and Juliet and The Sexual Neuroses of Our Parents	Young Actress of the Year	Won	
2009	Ulrich-Wildgruber-Preis	—N/a	—N/a	Won	
2013	Theater heute	—N/a	Best Actress	Won	
2019	Gertrud-Eysoldt-Ring	Hamlet	—N/a	Won	
2020	Berliner Theatertreffen	Hamlet	Theaterpreis Berlin	Won	

== Other awards and honours ==
Year	Association	Nominated work	Category	Result	Ref.
2005	Bavarian Film Awards	—N/a	Best New Actress	Won	
2006	German Film Awards	Requiem	Best Actress	Won	
2012	German Film Awards	Above Us Only Sky	Best Actress	Nominated	
2014	German Film Awards	Finsterworld	Best Supporting Actress	Won	
2014	German Television Awards	Polizeiruf 110	Best Actress	Nominated	
2016	Bavarian Film Awards	Toni Erdmann	Best Actress	Won	
2017	German Film Awards	Toni Erdmann	Best Actress	Won	
2018	German Film Awards	In the Aisles	Best Supporting Actress	Nominated	
2020	Order of Merit of the Federal Republic of Germany	—N/a	—N/a	Won	
2022	Hannelore Elsner Prize	—N/a	—N/a	Won	
2023	German Film Awards	Sisi & I	Best Actress	Nominated	
2023	Gotham Independent Film Awards	The Zone of Interest	Outstanding Supporting Performance	Nominated	
2024	Gold Derby Film Awards	Anatomy of a Fall	Best Actress	Won	
2024	Gold Derby Film Awards	Anatomy of a Fall	Best Ensemble Cast	Nominated	
2024	Lumière Awards	Anatomy of a Fall	Best Actress	Won	
2024	Satellite Awards	Anatomy of a Fall	Best Actress – Motion Picture Drama	Nominated	
2026	Gotham Independent Film Awards	Fatherland	Outstanding Supporting Performance	Pending	
