= Amour Fou (2014 film) =

- Directed by: Jessica Hausner
- Written by: Jessica Hausner
- Produced by: Martin Gschlacht; Antonin Svoboda; Bruno Wagner; Bady Minck; Alexander Dumreicher-Ivanceanu
- Starring: Birte Schnöink; Christian Friedel; Stephan Grossmann
- Cinematography: Martin Gschlacht
- Edited by: Karina Ressler
- Production companies: Amour Fou Luxembourg; Essential Filmproduktion; Coproduction Office
- Release dates: 16 May 2014 (Cannes); 6 November 2014 (Austria)
- Running time: 96 minutes
- Countries: Austria; Germany; Luxembourg
- Language: German

Amour Fou ("mad love") is a 2014 Austrian film directed by Jessica Hausner, starring Christian Friedel and Birte Schnöink. The story is set in Berlin in 1810 and 1811, and follows the German writer Heinrich von Kleist and his lover Henriette Vogel in the final stages of their lives. It was screened in the Un Certain Regard section at the 2014 Cannes Film Festival.

== Plot ==
In Berlin the affluent Henriette Vogel holds a soiree where the poet Heinrich von Kleist attends. Heinrich approaches his close friend and cousin Marie and after telling her how living has become painful to him he asks her to consider dying with him in a murder-suicide pact. Marie declines.

Heinrich then approaches Henriette and tells her that as Marie has declined his dearest wish his love for her is dying as his love for Henriette begins to blossom. After telling Henriette that he feels she is an unloved outsider like him he asks her to join him in death. Henriette is appalled at his characterization of her as she feels she is close to both her husband and her daughter. She refuses his offer. Shortly after Henriette begins to suffer from spasms and fainting fits.

Heinrich continues to visit with Henriette during her illness and finds her life mediocre and conventional as she will not even allow him to visit her alone in order not to raise gossip. He continues to hope that she will consent to die with him.

For a while Henriette's doctor cannot find the cause of her illness which he assures her is likely not serious. However, after sending samples of her urine and her medical file away for a second opinion he learns that she has a fatal tumour that will kill her before long. After learning of the news Henriette calls Heinrich to her home where she allows him to be alone with her for the first time. She tells him she is dying and admits that now she feels alone and unloved just as he described her. She tells him that she would like to enter into the suicide pact with him. Heinrich receives the news rather coldly telling Henriette he hoped that he would meet someone who was willing to die because he wanted to die and not for her own reasons. Reluctantly Heinrich and Henriette head off into the country together hoping to complete their pact. However at the inn where they are staying Heinrich meets an acquaintance and the three are forced to have an awkward dinner together with Heinrich's friend believing they are lovers. The trip is a failure and the two return home.

Heinrich then goes to visit his cousin Marie again who has returned from Paris newly engaged. Heinrich once again asks Marie to die with him and she refuses telling him that though life is stupid and pointless it is important to seek out the good. Having conclusively been rejected by Marie, Heinrich returns to Henriette and tells her he has been thinking of her constantly and asks her to renew their pact. She agrees.

Meanwhile, Henriette's husband, Vogel, returning from a trip to Paris tells Henriette that he showed her file to another doctor who believes she might not have a tumour after all. He asks her to accompany him to Paris where she can receive more advanced medical treatment. Noticing how close Henriette has become to Heinrich he also tells her that he would respect her choice if she decided to leave him for Heinrich. Henriette dismisses the idea calling Heinrich selfish.

Heinrich arrives at the Vogel house in order to usher Henriette away so they can die together. Henriette is reluctant to go but Vogel insists that the exercise and fresh air will be good for her. They tell Heinrich that there is a possibility that Henriette will live as they are planning to go to Paris to see another doctor.

Heinrich and Henriette go off together and stay the night at an inn where Heinrich reads a poem to Henriette and apologizes for ever doubting her. The next day they head off into the woods. Henriette begins to tell Heinrich that she had something to say the previous day but before she can finish her thought he shoots and kills her. Preparing to shoot himself in the head he fires twice only to have the gun not function both times.

After learning of the death of his wife Vogel searches his desk for a letter and eventually finds the note that Henriette wrote to him before her first planned suicide attempt hidden in a drawer. Going into the woods he is able to see both Henriette and Heinrich's bodies still lying out in the open.

Returning home Vogel learns from Henriette's physician that an autopsy revealed that Henriette was in good health with no tumour or ulcer. Vogel concludes that she killed herself for love of Heinrich.

== Cast ==
- Christian Friedel as Heinrich von Kleist
- Birte Schnöink as Henriette Vogel
- Stephan Grossmann as Vogel
- Sandra Hüller as Marie
- Sebastian Hülk as Ernst von Pfuel
- Peter Jordan as Adam Müller

== Production ==
The film was produced by Coop99 Filmproduktion in collaboration with Germany's Essential Filmproduktion and Luxembourg's Amour Fou. A great deal of research was put into the costumes and production design in order to avoid clichés seen in many period films. Hausner wanted a clear aesthetic with a lot of yellow and red colours. One source of inspiration for the visual style was the paintings of Johannes Vermeer. Filming took place in Luxembourg, Germany and Austria from February to October 2013.

== Reception ==
On review aggregator website Rotten Tomatoes, the film holds an approval rating of 89%, based on 47 reviews, and an average rating of 7.2/10. The website's critical consensus reads, "Amour Fou risks overpowering its deceptively impactful story with its remarkable visuals, but ultimately forms a fascinating whole." On Metacritic, the film has a weighted average score of 69 out of 100, based on 15 critics, indicating "generally favorable reviews".
