= Film Festival Cologne =

Annual film festival held in Cologne, Germany

- Location: Cologne, Germany
- Founded: 1991 (as Cologne Conference)
- Festival date: October 29–November 5, 2026
- Language: English; International
- Website: filmfestival.cologne/en/

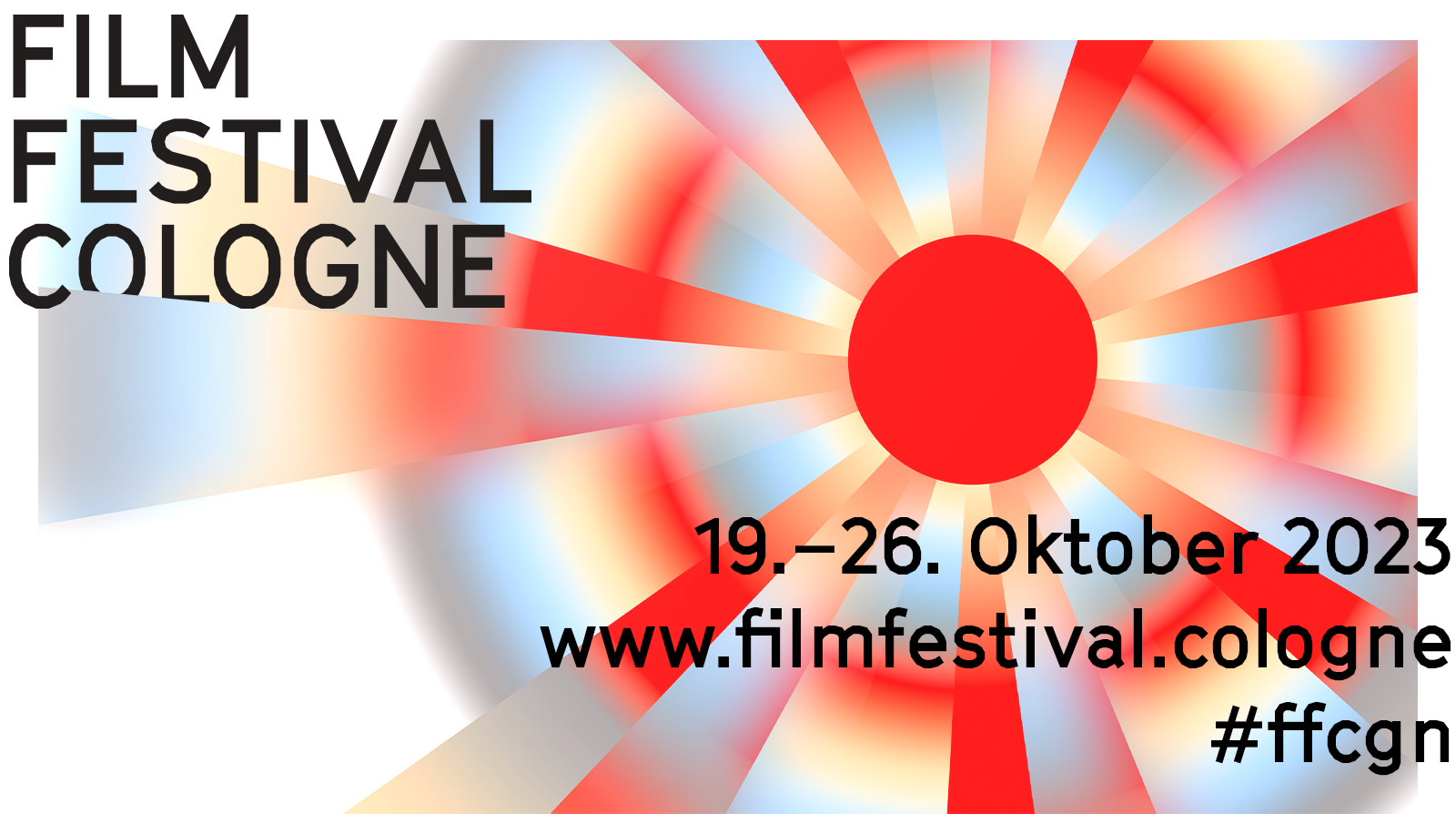

The Film Festival Cologne, formerly called the Cologne Conference, is an international film and television festival held annually since 1991 in Cologne, Germany. Screenings of independent films as well as debates on media politics and media aesthetic complement the event that draws over 30,000 visitors per year.

== History ==
The Cologne Conference was founded in 1991 by journalist and media researcher Lutz Hachmeister while he was the head of the Adolf-Grimme-Institut. In addition to the Grimme-Preis, a national award, an international television festival was originated.

The TV festival was part of German media convention media forum nrw; but it soon developed a momentum of its own and an international reputation. In 1993, the competitive festival section "TopTen" was established, which was, in 2001, divided into two sections, one section for fictional TV and one for documentary TV. In 2007, these two categories were recombined to one category, the "TopTen" section. In the same year, the second competitive festival section "Look", which presents visually extraordinary film and television productions, was created. In 2009, the competitive festival section "Kino" has also become a part of the Cologne Conference. The "Kino" section offers the most interesting aspects concerning film. The presentations and discussions within the Cologne Conference "Lectures" examine the relevant developments on the media market. Beyond that, a workshop discussion with the winner of the "Film Award Cologne" has become an inherent part of the "Lectures" since 2007. Furthermore, there are retrospectives and revivals of legendary television programmes, such as The Monkees, Twin Peaks or The Prisoner.

== Programme and Guests ==
One of the first TV productions presented at the Cologne Conference was David Lynch's mystery series Twin Peaks. Later almost all groundbreaking US TV series had their German premiere at the Cologne Conference, e.g. Emergency Room, Sex and the City or 24. Also British television always enjoyed strong presence, for instance with Cracker, The Office or Prime Suspect.

Besides German film and television stars, international celebrities such as Academy Award winners Paul Haggis, Florian Henckel von Donnersmarck, Michael Radford, Mstyslav Chernov and Justine Triet, Anton Corbijn, Nicolas Roeg, D.A. Pennebaker and Chris Hegedus, Mika Kaurismäki, Ole Bornedal, David Lynch, Todd Haynes, Paul Abbott, Tarsem Singh, Jane Campion, Nicolas Winding Refn, Xavier Dolan, Steve McQueen or Werner Herzog presented themselves in Cologne.

== Competition and awards ==
From roughly 800 international submissions, a jury selects the programmes for the festival sections "Best of Cinema Fiction, "Best of Cinema Documentary", "Look" and "TopTen TV". Since 1997, the Cologne Conference awards prizes in different categories. The TV Spielfilm Award, donated by the identically named TV program magazine, is given to the best contribution of the three festival sections. Furthermore, the German Casting Award goes to the best German casting agent and The Hollywood Reporter Award, sponsored by The Nielsen Company, goes to young and aspiring individuals in the media sector. Until 2007, the award for the best screenplay, sponsored by Network Movie, was also bestowed. Amongst others, it was given to Florian Henckel von Donnersmarck in 2006, who won the Oscar for The Lives of Others in 2007.

In 2007 the main award of the Cologne Conference, the "Film Award Cologne", was originated. This award honors outstanding creativity in film and TV and is worth EUR 25.000. It is bestowed upon those individuals, who best contribute "to the further development of the language of film and media". The award is presented by the Cologne Conference, along with the City of Cologne and States Film Subsidy Body "Filmstiftung NRW". The first laureate of the "Film Award Cologne" in 2007 was Canadian film director and writer Paul Haggis (LA Crash, Casino Royale) and in 2008, the award was given to the brothers Luc and Jean-Pierre Dardenne (L'Enfant, Lorna's Silence). In 2009, the award was bestowed upon Roman Polanski (Chinatown, The Pianist) but the Polish/French movie director was not able to receive the prize on 3 October in Cologne since he was arrested on 26 September during his journey to the Zurich Film Festival, which caused a worldwide sensation. In 2010 David Lynch was presented with the "Film Award Cologne" for his groundbreaking work in television and cinema. David Simon received the TV Spielfilm Award for his critically acclaimed series Treme. Todd Haynes was awarded the TV Spielfilm Award in 2011 for his extraordinary re-imagination of Mildred Pierce and the "Film Award Cologne" was presented to Tarsem Singh.

=== Laureates 2007 ===
- Film Award Cologne: Paul Haggis
- TV Spielfilm Award: Anton Corbijn for the movie Control
- Writer's Award: Hannah Hollinger for her lifework
- The Hollywood Reporter Award: Das perfekte Dinner

In 2007, the Cologne Conference was chaired by festival founder Lutz Hachmeister, along with Maybritt Illner, Stefan Aust, Marc Conrad, Michael Schmid-Ospach and Dieter Gorny.

=== Laureates 2008 ===
- Film Award Cologne: Jean-Pierre Dardenne and Luc Dardenne
- TV Spielfilm Award: Abi Morgan and Hettie Macdonald for the BBC movie White Girl
- German Casting Award: Franziska Aigner-Kuhn for the movie Die Welle
- The Hollywood Reporter Award: Christian Becker, Rat Pack film production
- Future TV Award: Sex and Zaziki by Sascha Jenschewski and Alexander Perschel

In 2008, the Cologne Conference was chaired by Lutz Hachmeister, along with, Stefan Aust, Marc Conrad, Michael Schmid-Ospach and Dieter Gorny.

=== Laureates 2009 ===
- Film Award Cologne: Roman Polanski
- TV Spielfilm Award: Lynda La Plante (Above Suspicion, ITV)
- The Hollywood Reporter Award: Max Wiedemann and Quirin Berg, Wiedemann & Berg Filmproduktion
- Casting Award: Nina Haun

In 2009, the Cologne Conference was chaired by festival founder Lutz Hachmeister, along with Stefan Aust, Marc Conrad, Michael Schmid-Ospach and Dieter Gorny.

=== Laureates 2010 ===
- Film Award Cologne: David Lynch
- TV Spielfilm Award: David Simon for the HBO series Treme
- The Hollywood Reporter Award: Jon Hamm and Elisabeth Moss for the AMC-series Mad Men
- Casting Award: Ulrike Müller for her casting work in the feature films When We Leave, Im Schatten and The City Below

=== Laureates 2011 ===
- Film Award Cologne: Tarsem Singh
- TV Spielfilm Award: Todd Haynes for the HBO series Mildred Pierce
- The Hollywood Reporter Award: Paul Abbott for the series Shameless and Exile.
- Casting Award: Sophie Molitoris for her casting work in the TV Movie Neue Vahr Süd.

=== Laureates 2012 ===
- Film Award Cologne: François Ozon
- TV Spielfilm Award: Michael Winterbottom for the movie Trishna.
- The Hollywood Reporter Award: Karl Baumgartner, for his lifework.
- Casting Award: Daniela Tolkien for her casting work in the movies Vicky and the Treasure of the Gods, Victor and the Secret of Crocodile Mansion and Offroad.

=== Laureates 2013 ===
- Film Award Cologne: Harmony Korine
- TV Spielfilm Award: Frauke Finsterwalder for the film Finsterworld
- The Hollywood Reporter Award: Sibel Kekilli
- Casting Award: Susanne Ritter
- International Actors Award: Isabelle Huppert

=== Laureates 2014 ===
- Film Award Cologne: Lars von Trier
- TV Spielfilm Award: Bertrand Tavernier for the film Quai d'Orsay
- The Hollywood Reporter Award: Tom Tykwer
- International Actors Award: Martina Gedeck

=== Laureates 2015 ===
- Film Award Cologne: Paolo Sorrentino
- TV Spielfilm Award: David Schalko for the series Altes Geld
- The Hollywood Reporter Award: Mathieu Amalric
- International Actors Award: Nora von Waldstätten
- Phoenix Award: Joshua Oppenheimer

=== Laureates 2016 ===
- Film Award Cologne: Claire Denis
- NRW Film Award for the best documentary: Family Business (Director: Christiane Büchner, producer: Tobias Büchner, Büchner.Filmproduktion)
- NRW Film Award for the best movie: Toni Erdmann (Director: Maren Ade, producer: Janine Jackowski, Jonas Dornbach, Maren Ade, Komplizen Film)
- TV Spielfilm Award: Lucie Borleteau for the series Cannabis
- The Hollywood Reporter Award: Christopher Doyle
- International Actors Award: Peter Simonischek
- Phoenix Award: Pieter-Jan De Pue

=== Laureates 2017 ===
- Film Award Cologne: Jane Campion
- NRW Film Award for the best documentary: Peter Handke – Bin im Wald. Kann sein, dass ich mich verspäte... (Director: Corinna Belz, producer: Thomas Kufus, zero one film)
- NRW Film Award for the best movie: Der traumhafte Weg (Director: Angela Schanelec)
- TV Spielfilm Award: Margarethe von Trotta for Forget About Nick
- The Hollywood Reporter Award: Sean Bean
- International Actors Award: Juliette Binoche
- Phoenix Award: Kevin Macdonald

=== Laureates 2018 ===
- Film Award Cologne: Luca Guadagnino
- NRW Film Award for the best documentary: Lucica und ihre sechs Kinder (Director/producer: Bettina Braun)
- NRW Film Award for the best movie: Wintermärchen (Producer: Bettina Brokemper, director: Jan Bonny)
- The Hollywood Reporter Award: Paweł Pawlikowski
- International Actors Award: Lars Eidinger
- Phoenix Award: Chris Martin (British television journalist and filmmaker)

=== Laureates 2019 ===
- Film Award Cologne: Nicolas Winding Refn
- NRW Film Award: Easy Love (Producer: Lino Rettinger, director: Tamer Jandali)
- The Hollywood Reporter Award: Abel Ferrara for his film Tommaso
- International Actors Award: August Diehl
- Cologne Creative Award: Hideo Kojima
- Phoenix Award: Nanfu Wang for her film One Child Nation

=== Laureates 2020 ===
- Film Award Cologne: Dominik Graf
- NRW Film Award: Mit eigenen Augen (Producer: Harry Flöter, Regina Jorissen and Jörg Siepmann, director: Miguel Müller-Frank)
- The Hollywood Reporter Award: Thomas Vinterberg for his film Another Round
- International Actors Award: Mads Mikkelsen
- International Actress Award: Sandra Hüller
- Cologne Creative Award: CD Projekt Red
- Phoenix Award: Radu Ciorniciuc for her film Acasă, my Home
- Manfred Stelzer Award: Richard Huber for his film Der König von Köln
- NRW Media Award for developmental policy commitment: Reporter ohne Grenzen (The Uncensored Library), Fridays for Future (#weekforclimate 2019) and Viva con Agua (#streamforwater)

=== Laureates 2021 ===
- Film Award Cologne: Steve McQueen
- NRW Film Award: Dokumentarfilm Auf Anfang by Georg Nonnenmacher and Mike Schlömer
- The Hollywood Reporter Award: Gaspar Noé für his film Vortex
- International Actors Award: Albrecht Schuch
- Phoenix Award: Phil Grabsky for his film My Childhood, My Country: 20 Years in Afghanistan
- Manfred Stelzer Award: Maria Schrader for her film I'm Your Man
- NRW Media Award for developmental policy commitment: WHAT IF...? In 80 Fragen um die Welt, YouTopia – Gemeinsam für die Umwelt and Der Stoff, aus dem die Träume sind

=== Laureates 2022 ===
- Film Award Cologne: Michel Hazanavicius
- NRW Film Award: A Room of My Own by Ioseb Bliadze
- The Hollywood Reporter Award: Mia Hansen-Løve for her film One Fine Morning
- International Actors Award: Nina Hoss
- Phoenix Award: Benedetta Argentieri for her film The Matchmaker
- Manfred Stelzer Award: Nana Neul for her film Daughters (Töchter)
- NRW Media Award for developmental policy commitment: The Truth Wins (Reporter ohne Grenzen), Gamechanger Week (Kindernothilfe e. V.) and Nachschlag (Utopia.de)

=== Laureates 2023 ===
- Film Award Cologne: Justine Triet
- NRW Film Award: A Good Place by Katharina Huber
- The Hollywood Reporter Award: Xavier Dolan for his series The Night Logan Woke Up
- International Actors Award: Oliver Masucci
- Phoenix Award: Kaouther Ben Hania for Four Daughters
- Manfred Stelzer Award: Sonja Heiss for directing When Will it Finally Be Like it Never Was Again?
- NRW Media Award for developmental policy commitment: The World’s Most Dangerous Show (Florida Entertainment für Amazon Prime), Periodic Power (World Vision Germany) und Waterproof - Dance4WASH (Viva con Agua de Sankt Pauli)

=== Laureates 2024 ===
- Film Award Cologne: Raoul Peck
- NRW Film Award: The Devil's Bath by Veronika Franz and Severin Fiala
- The Hollywood Reporter Award: Mohammad Rasoulof for his film The Seed of the Sacred Fig
- International Actors Award: Udo Kier
- Phoenix Award: Michael Premo for Homegrown

=== Laureates 2025 ===
- Film Award Cologne: Werner Herzog
- International Actors Award: Maren Eggert
- Hollywood Reporter Award for Best Fiction Work: Kleber Mendonça Filho – The Secret Agent (Brazil/France/Germany/Netherlands)
- Phoenix Award for Best Documentary Work: Mstyslav Chernov – 2000 Meters to Andriivka (Ukraine)
- NRW Film Award: Hysteria – Mehmet Akif Büyükatalay (Germany)
- NRW Media Award for Development Policy Engagement
  - First prize: Besser Jetzt Als Peter. #StopDeepSeaMining – Greenpeace E.V.
  - Second prize: Ready to Recycle – MBRC the Ocean gGmbH
  - Third prize: #Road to Freedom: Auf den Spuren der Befreiung – Capa-Haus Leipzig x Leon Ziegler x Roofless Cat
