= Sisi & I =

2023 film by Frauke Finsterwalder

- Theatrical release poster
- German: Sisi & Ich
- Directed by: Frauke Finsterwalder
- Written by: Frauke Finsterwalder; Christian Kracht
- Produced by: Tobias Walker; Philipp Worm
- Starring: Susanne Wolff; Sandra Hüller
- Cinematography: Thomas W. Kiennast
- Edited by: Andreas Menn
- Music by: Matteo Pagamici
- Production companies: Walker + Worm Film; MMC Independent; C-Films AG; Dor Film Produktionsgesellschaft
- Distributed by: DCM (Germany and Switzerland); Panda Film (Austria)
- Release dates: 19 February 2023 (Berlinale); 30 March 2023 (Austria, Germany and Switzerland)
- Running time: 132 minutes
- Countries: Germany; Switzerland; Austria
- Languages: German; English; French
- Box office: $41,208 in the Netherlands

Sisi & I (German: Sisi & Ich) is a 2023 historical black comedy film directed by Frauke Finsterwalder, who co-wrote the screenplay with Christian Kracht. It stars Susanne Wolff as Empress Elisabeth of Austria and Sandra Hüller as Countess Irma Sztáray. It tells a fictionalized story of Empress Elisabeth of Austria from the point of view of her lady-in-waiting, Irma Sztáray. The film is an international co-production between Germany, Switzerland and Austria. Sisi & I made its world premiere in the Panorama section of the 2023 Berlin Film Festival on 19 February 2023. It was released theatrically in Austria by Panda Film, and in Germany and Switzerland by DCM on 30 March 2023.

Finsterwalder won the 2023 Bavarian Film Award for Best Director for the film. It also received four nominations for the 2023 German Film Award, including Best Actress for Sandra Hüller, and won the award for Best Costume Design. The film also received the Austrian Film Award for Best Costume Design in 2024.

== Plot ==
Late in the 19th century, the single, middle-aged Hungarian countess Irma Sztáray, having rejected marriage and the convent, is forced by her overbearing mother to apply to be handmaiden to the increasingly reclusive Empress Elisabeth of Austria, also known as Sisi. An extravagant and temperamental woman, Sisi has been separated from her husband for many years and is living in an aristocratic women-only commune in Corfu, Greece. After a humiliating interview by her predecessor, Irma arrives at the estate seasick and heatstruck, and is immediately put through her paces by her new mistress. Though initially uncertain, Irma soon bows to the will of the Empress in all things, curbing her healthy appetite to match Sisi's obsessively restricted one and parting with her frou-frou ribbons and lace to adopt Sisi's preferred, Japanese-influenced style. Irma falls madly in love with the Empress, and as they travel from Corfu to Algiers, Bavaria to England, the two develop a co-dependent bond – though naturally, only as close as Sisi will allow.

== Cast ==
- Susanne Wolff as Empress Elisabeth of Austria
- Sandra Hüller as Countess Irma Sztáray
- Tom Rhys Harries as Captain Smythe
- Stefan Kurt as Count Berzeviczy
- Johanna Wokalek as Countess Marie Festetics
- Angela Winkler as Ludovika, Duchess in Bavaria
- Georg Friedrich as Archduke Ludwig Viktor of Austria
- Annette Badland as Queen Victoria
- Anthony Calf as Charles Spencer, 6th Earl Spencer
- Markus Schleinzer as Emperor Franz Joseph of Austria
- Sibylle Canonica as Maria Török de Szendrõ
- Tom Lass as Tsar Nicholas II of Russia
- Ravi Aujla as Doctor Bose
- Anne Müller as Baronin von Rothschildt
- Frank Böhm as Hungarian Doctor
- Alexander Korn as Diener
- William Erazo Fernández as Porter
- Sophie Hutter as Fritzi

== Production ==
=== Development ===
On 5 November 2019, Screen International announced that German sales company The Match Factory would handle international sales on Frauke Finsterwalder's upcoming period drama, whose working title was Sisi – Kaiserin Elisabeth (Sisi – Empress Elisabeth in English), and that it would begin shooting in autumn 2020 in Germany, Switzerland, Ireland and Morocco.

Finsterwalder co-wrote the screenplay with her husband, the bestselling Swiss author Christian Kracht. They had previously collaborated on Finsterwalder's first feature film, Finsterworld (2013), which starred Sandra Hüller, who plays Irma Sztáray in this film. It was reported that their screenplay would tell the story of Empress Elisabeth of Austria through the eyes of her lady-in-waiting in a period in which she was surrounded only by other women and separated from her husband for many years. Finsterwalder described it as "a feminist film full of biting dialogue, a gripping drama with elements of deep black comedy."

In the film's 2019 press release, Finsterwalder said:

Films should try to create new mythologies. Empress Elisabeth was a radical, intelligent and modern woman, far more so than the Sissi with the double S that we all know. She was simply born a century too early.

On 21 September 2020, the new working title was announced as Sisi und ich, and it was reported that Susanne Wolff and Sandra Hüller had been cast to play Elisabeth (aka Sisi) and Irma, respectively. Ella Rumpf, Stefan Kurt, Angela Winkler, Johannes Krisch, Maresi Riegner and Sophie Rois were also confirmed in the cast. The title was changed again in 2022 to Sisi & Ich (Sisi & I).

The film is a co-production between Germany's Walker + Worm Film, MMC Independent, Switzerland's C-Films and Austria's Dor Film. It was shot entirely on Super 16 mm film.

In an interview for Women and Hollywood in February 2023, Finsterwalder described the film as "a somewhat wild reinterpretation of the “Sisi” myth that isn't really bothered by historical facts." When Finsterwalder started thinking about "Sisi" as a character, the 2019 documentary Leaving Neverland about Michael Jackson had just been released, and due to her personal experiences, the issue of the notion of grooming was central, and this is how she began the story of Countess Irma. "It is the aristotelian question: What is friendship? And why are friendships made? Out of sympathy? Out of love? Out of calculation? And what happens to friendship or love when the equilibrium of power is unbalanced?", Finsterwalder said.

=== Filming ===
Principal photography started on 20 September 2021 and wrapped on 15 November 2021. Filming took place in Germany, Bavaria, Vienna, Malta and Switzerland.

== Marketing ==
The film's first official German poster was unveiled on 15 November 2022. A teaser trailer was released on 15 December 2022.

Three clips from the film were unveiled in February 2023.

== Soundtrack ==
The film features songs by Nico, Le Tigre, Dory Previn, Portishead, Pop Tarts, Would-Be-Goods, Seagull Screaming Kiss Her Kiss Her, and others. Finsterwalder has said in interviews she only considered female voices for the soundtrack.

== Release ==
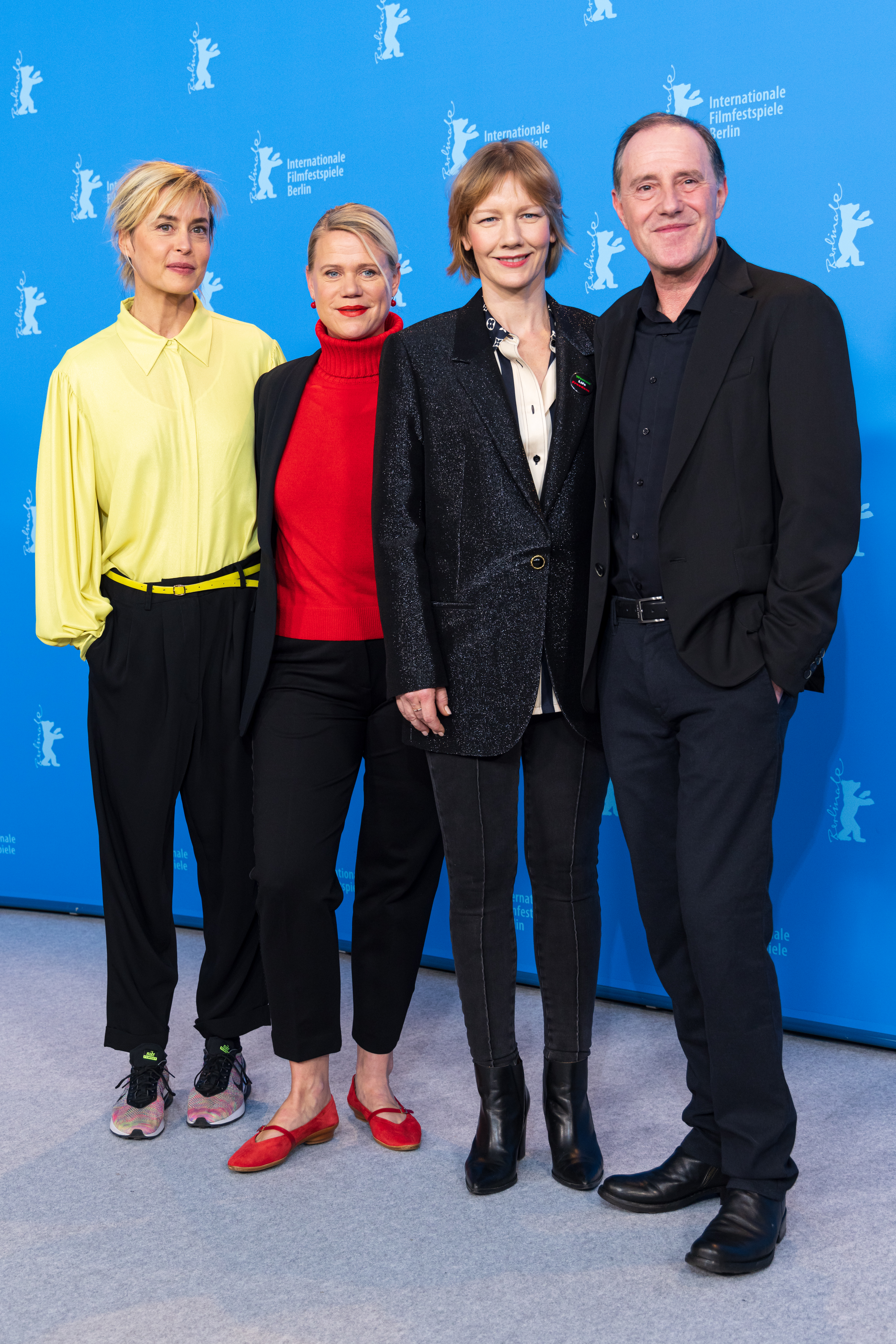
Susanne Wolff, Frauke Finsterwalder, Sandra Hüller and Stefan Kurt at the premiere of Sisi & I at the 2023 Berlinale

The film was originally set to be released in spring 2022. It made its world premiere at the 73rd Berlin International Film Festival on 19 February 2023. It was scheduled to be released theatrically in Germany and Switzerland by DCM on 16 March 2023, but the release date in both countries was pushed back to 30 March 2023. Panda Film released the film in Austria on the same day. A companion book to the film featuring the entire screenplay, film stills, a behind the scenes look and a conversation between Frauke Finsterwalder and Christian Kracht was published on 29 March 2023.

The runtime announced in 2022 was 110 minutes. Shortly before the film's premiere at the 2023 Berlin Film Festival, the runtime announced on the festival's official website was 132 minutes.

== Reception ==
On the review aggregator website Rotten Tomatoes, 65% of 17 critics' reviews are positive, with an average rating of 6.5/10.

Susanne Gottlieb of Cineuropa wrote: "Tackling the Sisi story from an entirely new perspective, Frauke Finsterwalder offers a thought-provoking and entertaining glance at the famous empress", "refraining from making her that sweet little girl from the Ernst Marischka films with Romy Schneider, and similarly steering clear of reimagining her as a feminist icon, as recent media projects have done, is a tactic that works wonders for the character." In France, Judith Beauvallet of Ecran Large wrote: "The image, for its part, is very pictorial in inspiration, each shot reminiscent of paintings from different periods, from Marie Laurencin to Edward Hopper via Auguste Toulmouche. Finsterwalder combines styles to create a universe that is extremely colorful in its melancholy."

== Awards and nominations ==
In August 2023, Sisi & I was one of the 12 films shortlisted by Germany to be selected as the country's official submission for the Best International Feature Film category at the 96th Academy Awards.

Year	Award / Festival	Category	Recipient(s)	Result	Ref.
2023	73rd Berlin Film Festival	Panorama Audience Award for Best Feature Film	Frauke Finsterwalder	Nominated	
2023	73rd Berlin Film Festival	Teddy Award - Best LGBT Feature Film	Frauke Finsterwalder	Nominated	
2023	German Camera Award	Best Cinematography	Thomas W. Kiennast	Nominated	
2023	German Film Award	Best Actress	Sandra Hüller	Nominated	
2023	German Film Award	Best Cinematography	Thomas W. Kiennast	Nominated	
2023	German Film Award	Best Costume Design	Tanja Hausner	Won	
2023	German Film Award	Best Sound Design	Marco Teufen, Paul Rischer and Gregor Bonse	Nominated	
2023	Bavarian Film Awards	Best Director	Frauke Finsterwalder	Won	
2024	Austrian Film Award	Best Costume Design	Tanja Hausner	Won	
2024	Austrian Film Award	Best Set Design	Katharina Wöppermann	Nominated	
