= Susanne Jensen =

German artist and actor

Susanne Jensen (born October 11, 1963 in Lüdenscheid, Germany) is a German artist, abuse survivor and pastor of the Evangelical Church in Germany. She was awarded Best Actress at the Sitges Film Festival in 2021 for her role as Maria in the drama and horror film Luzifer ex-aequo with Noomi Raspace (Lamb). Jensen's film son Johannes was Franz Rogowski.

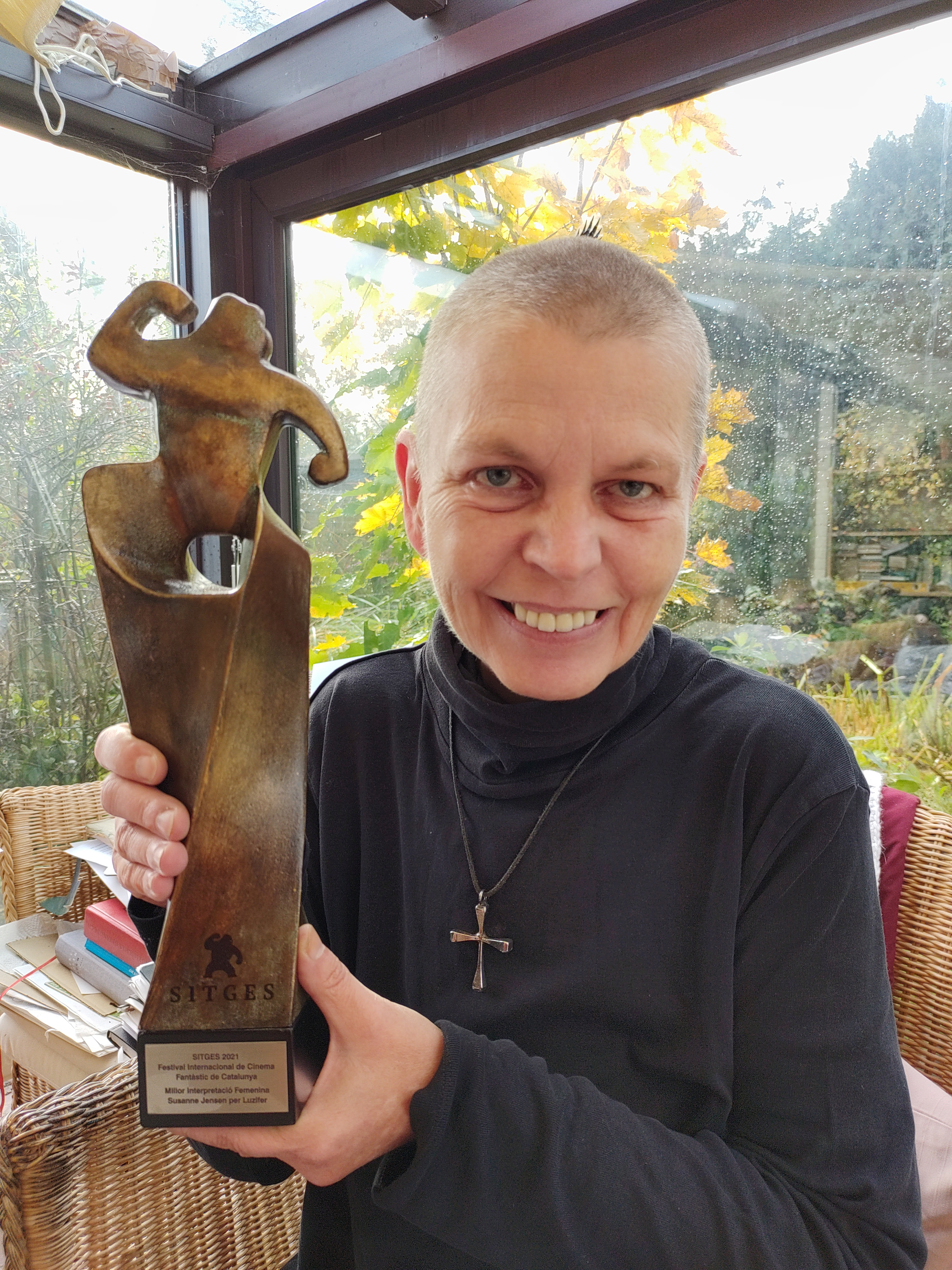
Susanne Jensen

== Life and career ==
Susanne Jensen was born 1963 in Germany. She experienced years of sexual violence in her childhood and adolescence. In the German documentary of the WDR "Menschen hautnah: Es war der eigene Vater" she speaks about her experiences.

Jensen is a pastor and speaks openly about her way out of the children's hell labyrinth. Faith and art are paths of liberation for Jensen.

In the film "Luzifer", shot 2019 in the Austrian Alps, Susanne Jensen plays a mother who lives secluded in a hut with her mentally handicapped son. Their lives are characterized by religious rituals and trust. But paradise is threatened with destruction.

Susanne Jensen brings to the film "Luzifer" her feelings as an abuse survivor. Due to the chronic pain, post-traumatic stress disorder and her multiple personalities, filming was a big challenge. Her performance in the film is seen as very touching. In her acceptance speech for the best actress award, Jensen highlights how incredible it was to have a film son for three months, as she would not have had children due to the violence she had experienced.

== Awards ==
2021: Sitges Film Festival Best Actress in "Luzifer"
