= Lutz Hachmeister =

German author, journalist and film director (1959–2024)

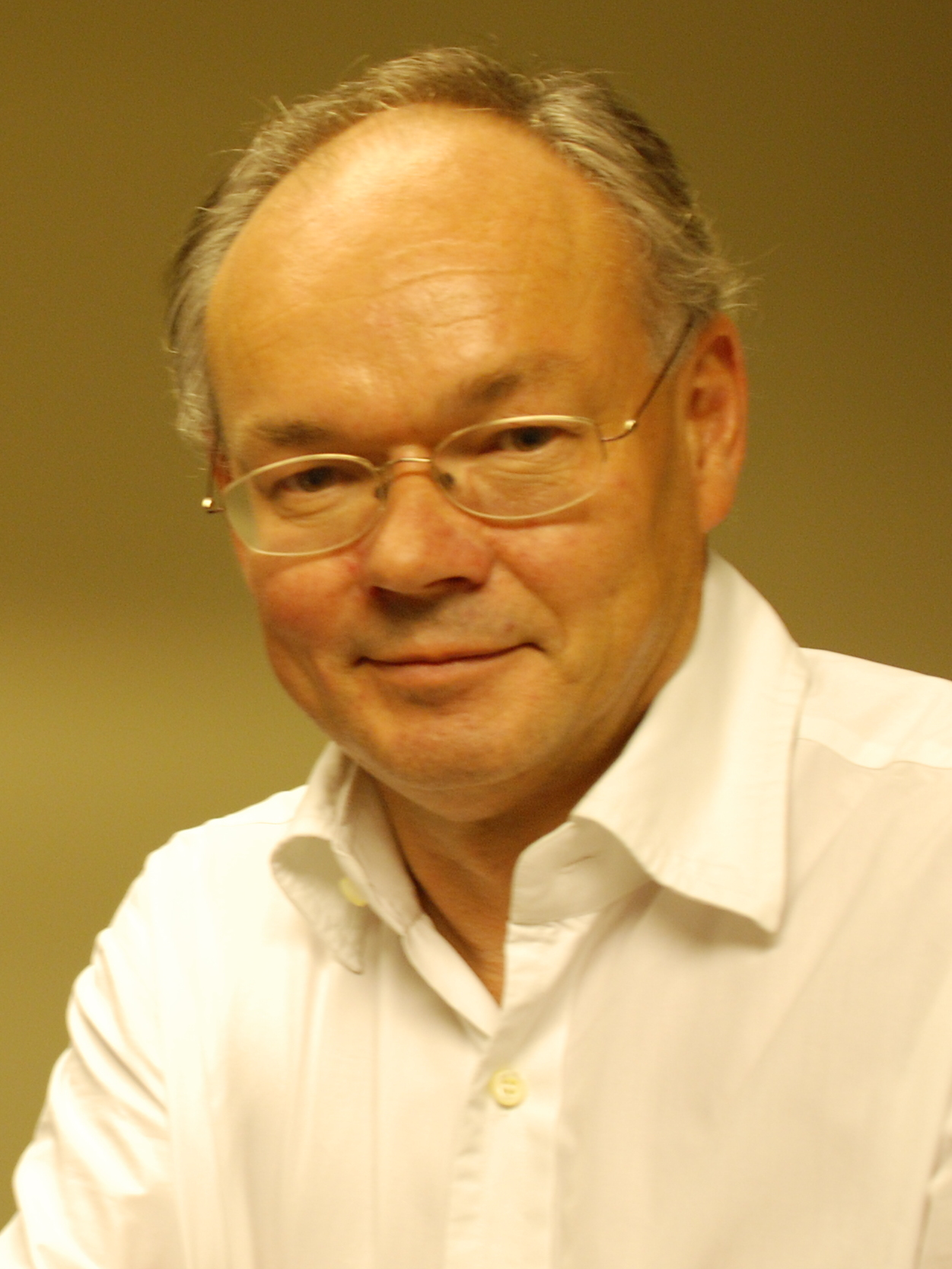
- Hachmeister in 2007
- Born: 10 September 1959; Minden, North Rhine-Westphalia, West Germany
- Died: 26 August 2024 (aged 64); Cologne, North Rhine-Westphalia, Germany
- Education: University of Münster
- Occupations: Author, journalist, film director
- Known for: Media studies Documentary films Journalism
- Website: http://www.medienpolitik.eu

Lutz Hachmeister (10 September 1959 – 26 August 2024) was a German media historian, award-winning filmmaker and journalist. He particularly gained international attention for directing the 2005 film The Goebbels Experiment, co-produced by the BBC and the Canadian History channel, and featuring Kenneth Branagh as the narrator for the Goebbels Diaries. In 2006 Hachmeister established the Institute for Media and Communication Policy (IfM) in Berlin and Cologne, which is strongly tied to the Anglo-American media scene.

== Academic career ==
Hachmeister was born in Minden, Westphalia. He graduated from the University of Münster, writing his doctoral thesis about the history of communication research in Germany. His professorial thesis (Habilitation) deals with Franz Six, Adolf Eichmann's superior, who was nominated to rule Great Britain as the head of the SD (Security Service of the Nazi paramilitary force SS) in case of a German occupation. Hachmeister's book about Six's career was widely recognized as one of the "new biographies" in the 1990s, describing in detail the mentality and role of the young academic elite in shaping the "Third Reich".

Contrary to current trends in media studies and communication research, Hachmeister's "konkrete Kommunikationsforschung" (concrete communication research) relies heavily on the classical socio-psychological models in US communication studies (Harold Dwight Lasswell, Robert Ezra Park). He also frequently referred to the Canadian communication theory and the German decisionist law professor Carl Schmitt.

== Professional career ==
As a journalist, Hachmeister worked for several leading German newspapers, such as Der Tagesspiegel, Die Woche and Süddeutsche Zeitung. He also was an associate professor of journalism at the University of Dortmund. His research on former Nazi intelligence specialists in the formative years of Germany's leading news magazine Der Spiegel aroused a debate about the history of the paper, which was usually considered to have pure leftist-liberal traditions. Hachmeister's documentary about the life and death of Hanns Martin Schleyer, the former head of the German employers association, who was murdered in 1977 by the Red Army Faction, won a Grimme-Award (Germany's most prestigious television prize) in 2004. The following year, The Goebbels Experiment premiered at the Berlin Film Festival and was selected as a New York Times critics' pick.

Hachmeister later headed the Institute for Media and Communication Policy and was considered "Germany's leading media expert" (Berliner Zeitung, 21 July 1997). The Institute is particularly known for its high-ranking media colloquia, which hosts international guests like Alan Rusbridger, Greg Dyke or Norman Pearlstine. Hachmeister was also the founder of the Cologne Conference, a "media Bauhaus" and festival for aesthetic and strategic trends in the audiovisual industry.

== Death ==
Hachmeister died in Cologne on 26 August 2024, at the age of 64.

== Selected films ==
- 2017 "Wallraff war hier" (biographical documentary about German undercover journalist Günter Wallraff)
- 2015 "Der Hannover-Komplex" (documentary about the rise of the city of Hanover as a political powerhouse in Germany)
- 2011 The Real American – Joe McCarthy (docudrama, starring John Sessions, Justine Waddell and Trystan Gravelle)
- 2010 Three Stars ("Die Köche und die Sterne", TV documentary)
- 2008 Revolution! Das Jahr 1968 (Revolution! The Year 1968, documentary with Stefan Aust)
- 2008 Freundschaft! – Die Freie Deutsche Jugend (Friendship, documentary about the Free German Youth organization in the former German Democratic Republic)
- 2007 Baie des Milliardaires (Bay of Billionaires, documentary about the Cap d'Antibes)
- 2005 The Goebbels Experiment (documentary, narrated by Kenneth Branagh)
- 2004 Schleyer. Eine deutsche Geschichte. (Schleyer – The Business of Terror, documentary)
- 2000 Hotel Provençal. Aufstieg und Fall der Riviera. (Documentary about the rise and fall of the hotel at the French Riviera)
- 1997/98 mondän! (TV series about the posh places of the 1960s like Deauville, Portofino, Saint Tropez)

== Selected bibliography ==
- Hitlers Interviews: Der Diktator und die Journalisten. Köln, Kiepenheuer & Witsch 2024
- Hôtel Provençal. Eine Geschichte der Côte d‘Azur. Munich, C. Bertelsmann 2021
- Hannover. Ein deutsches Machtzentrum, Munich, DVA 2016
- Heideggers Testament. Der Philosoph, der Spiegel und die SS, Berlin, Propyläen 2014
- Grundlagen der Medienpolitik: Ein Handbuch. Munich, DVA 2008
- Nervöse Zone: Politik und Journalismus in der Berliner Republik. Munich, DVA 2007
- Wer beherrscht die Medien? Die 50 größten Medienkonzerne der Welt.4th ed., Munich, Beck 2005 (edited with Günther Rager)
- Schleyer. Eine deutsche Geschichte. Beck, Munich 2004
- Der Gegnerforscher. Die Karriere des SS-Führers Franz Alfred Six. Munich, Beck 1998
- Theoretische Publizistik. Studien zur Geschichte der Kommunikationswissenschaft in Deutschland. Berlin, Wissenschaftsverlag Spiess 1987
