= Sitges Film Festival =

Annual Spanish film festival

Coordinates: 41°51′N 1°34′E

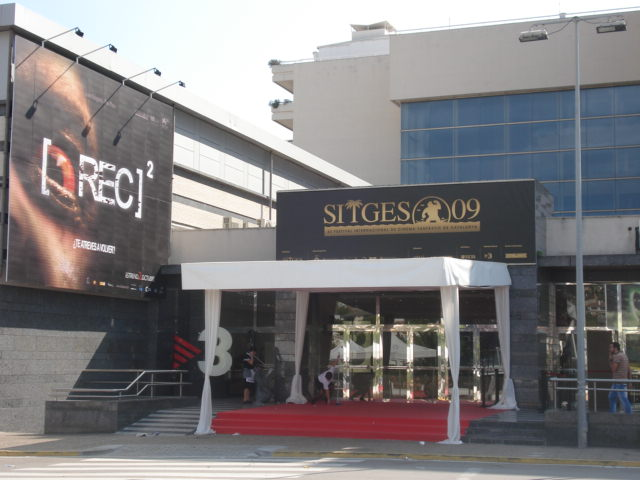
- Sitges Film Festival in 2009
- Location: Sitges, Catalonia, Spain
- Founded: 1968
- Most recent: 2025
- Awards: Best Film; Best Director; Best Actor; Best Actress
- Festival date: Annually, October
- Language: Spanish
- Website: Sitges

Current: 59th Sitges Film Festival
- 59th 57th

SITGES - International Fantastic Film Festival of Catalonia (Catalan: Festival Internacional de Cinema Fantàstic de Catalunya) is an annual film festival held in Sitges, Catalonia, Spain. It specializes in fantasy, horror and cult films. Established in 1968, the festival takes place every year, usually in early October, and is considered to be one of the world's top three largest and most prestigious genre film festivals, alongside Fantasia and Fantastic Fest.

== History ==
The festival's origins lie in the International Week of Fantasy and Horror Movies, held in 1968.

The 58th edition of the festival was held from 9 to 19 October 2025. The winner of the Best Feature Film in SOFC was Emilie Blichfeldt for her film The Ugly Stepsister (Den stygge stesøsteren).

In July 2026, the Sitges Film Festival and the International Federation of Film Critics announced the establishment of a three-member FIPRESCI jury awarding a FIPRESCI Award among the 'Official Fantàstic In-Competition Selection' titles beginning with the 2026 festival edition.

== Venues ==
The main venue of the Sitges Film Festival is the Auditori (Auditorium), located in the Hotel Melià Sitges, which has a capacity of 1,380 seats. In the same building the Tramuntana Room provides space for journalists to gather each morning.

As of 2023, other venues are: Cine El Retiro, Cine Casino Prado, and various other venues in the "King Kong area" providing for exhibitions, gatherings, and other events.

== Directors ==
As of 2026, the director of the festival since 2001 is Àngel Sala Corbí. Previous directors have included:

- Roc Villas i Ventura (1999–2000)
- Àlex Gorina i Macià (1994–1998)

== Awards ==
Since 1971 the festival has given awards to the best films, actors, and filmmakers.

The festival is accredited by FIAPF as a "competitive film festival specialised in fantasy films".

The Gorilla (Official Fantastic Section) are the festival's main awards. Award-winners are selected by an international jury. These awards are:

- Best Feature-Length Film
- Best Director
- Best Actor
- Best Actress
- Best Screenplay
- Best Special Effects
- Best Cinematography
- Best Original Score
- Special Jury Prize
- Grand Audience Award for Best Motion Picture (Official Fantastic Selection)
- Best Fantastic Genre Short Film

The festival also presents:

- The José Luis Guarner Critics' Award
- Citizen Kane Award for the Best Debut Feature (Best New Director)
- The Noves Visions (New Visions) Award
- The Carnet Jove Jury Award (film selected by a youth jury)
- The Grand Honorary Award (for Lifetime Achievement in Cinema)
- The Anima't Awards for Best Animated Short and Feature Film
- The Màquina del Temps (Time Machine) Award, given to individuals from the fantasy world film genre
- The Midnight X-Treme Award, for the best motion picture from the special screenings (selected by the Carnet Jove Jury)
- Time Machine Award: In recognition of the lifetime achievement of film personalities and/or institutions that have had a special relationship with the festival and, above all, with the fantastic genre.

and a few others.

== Winners ==
Year	Best Film	Best Director	Best Actor	Best Actress
1971		Janusz Majewski (Lokis) and Michael Skaife (Necrophagus)	Vincent Price (The Abominable Dr. Phibes)	Youn Yuh-jung (Woman of Fire)
1972	The Cremator	Robert Mulligan (The Other)	Rudolf Hrusinsky (The Cremator)	Geraldine Chaplin (Zero Population Growth)
1973		Juan Luis Buñuel (Au rendez-vous de la mort joyeuse)	Eugene Levy (Cannibal Girls)	Andrea Martin (Cannibal Girls)
1974		Robert Fuest (Dr. Phibes Rises Again)	Mark Burns (House of the Living Dead)	Cristina Galbó (Let Sleeping Corpses Lie)
1975		David Cronenberg (Shivers)	Paul Naschy (La Maldicion de la Bestia)	Lana Turner (Persecution)
1976		Dario Argento (Profondo Rosso)	Peter Cushing (The Ghoul)	Brenda Vaccaro (Death Weekend)
1977		Dan Curtis (Burnt Offerings)	Burgess Meredith (Burnt Offerings)	Karen Black (Burnt Offerings)
1978	Long Weekend	Richard Franklin (Patrick)	John Hargreaves (Long Weekend)	Camille Keaton (Day of the Woman)
1979		Juraj Herz (Panna a netvor)	Gerhard Olschewski (Der Mörder)	Lisa Pelikan (Jennifer)
1980		Veljko Bulajic (The Man to Destroy)	Nicholas Worth (Don't Answer the Phone)	Cyd Hayman (The Godsend)
1981		Walerian Borowczyk (Docteur Jekyll et les femmes)	Mircea Bogdan (Povestea dragostei)	Linda Haynes (Human Experiments)
1982		Tony Williams (Next of Kin)	Richard Chamberlain (The Last Wave)	Annie McEnroe (Warlords of the 21st Century)
1983	Le Dernier Combat	Luc Besson (Le Dernier Combat)	Vincent Price, Christopher Lee, Peter Cushing, John Carradine (House of the Long Shadows)	Elizabeth Ward (Alone in the Dark)
1984	The Company of Wolves	Carl Schenkel (Abwärts)	Joe Morton (The Brother from Another Planet)	Amy Madigan (Streets of Fire)
1985	Re-Animator	Shuji Terayama (Farewell to the Ark)	John Walcutt (Return)	Lori Cardille (Day of the Dead)
1986	Blue Velvet	Sergei Parajanov, Dodo Abashidze (The Legend of the Suram Fortress)	Juanjo Puigcorbé (Més enllà de la passió)	Caroline Williams (The Texas Chainsaw Massacre Part 2)
1987	A Hungarian Fairy Tale	Paul Verhoeven (RoboCop)	Michael Nouri (The Hidden)	Jill Schoelen (The Stepfather)
1988	The Navigator: A Medieval Odyssey	George A. Romero (Monkey Shines)	Grigory Gladiy (Otstupnik)	Kate McNeil (Monkey Shines)
1989	Heart of Midnight	Peter Greenaway (The Cook, the Thief, His Wife & Her Lover)	Michael Gambon (The Cook, the Thief, His Wife & Her Lover), Nicolas Cage (Vampire's Kiss)	Rosanna Arquette (Black Rainbow)
1990	Henry: Portrait of a Serial Killer	ex-aequo: Sam Raimi (Darkman), John McNaughton (Henry: Portrait of a Serial Killer)	Jeff Goldblum (Mister Frost)	Lindsay Duncan (The Reflecting Skin)
1991	Europa	Jean-Pierre Jeunet, Marc Caro (Delicatessen)	Dominique Pinon (Delicatessen)	Juliet Stevenson (Truly, Madly, Deeply)
1992	Man Bites Dog	Quentin Tarantino (Reservoir Dogs)	Benoît Poelvoorde (Man Bites Dogs)	Joey Wang (A Chinese Ghost Story III)
1993	Orlando	Dave Borthwick (The Secret Adventures of Tom Thumb)	Federico Luppi (Cronos)	Jennifer Ward-Lealand (Desperate Remedies)
1994	71 Fragmente einer Chronologie des Zufalls & Justino, un asesino de la tercera edad	Scott McGehee, David Siegel (Suture)	Santiago Segura (Justino)	Jane Horrocks (Deadly Advice)
1995	Citizen X	Chris Gerolmo (Citizen X), Michael Almereyda (Nadja (film))	Stephen Rea (Citizen X)	Bridget Fonda (Rough Magic)
1996	The Pillow Book	Mohsen Makhmalbaf (Gabbeh)	James Woods (Killer: A Journal of Murder)	Melinda Clarke (Killer Tongue)
1997	Gattaca	Scott Reynolds (The Ugly)	Sam Rockwell (Lawn Dogs)	Reese Witherspoon (Freeway)
1998	Cube	Michael Di Jiacomo (Animals with the Tollkeeper)	Jared Harris (Trance)	Évelyne Dandry (Sitcom)
1999	Ringu	Ben Hopkins (Simon Magus)	Noah Taylor (Simon Magus)	Emma Vilarasau (The Nameless)
2000	In the Light of the Moon	Geoffrey Wright (Cherry Falls)	Steve Railsback (In the Light of the Moon)	
2001	Vidocq	Brad Anderson (Session 9)	Eduard Fernández (Fausto 5.0)	Yūki Amami (Inugami)
2002	Dracula: Pages From a Virgin's Diary	David Cronenberg (Spider)	Jeremy Northam (Cypher)	Angela Bettis (May)
2003	Zatōichi	Alexandre Aja (High Tension)	Robert Downey Jr. (The Singing Detective)	Cécile de France (High Tension)
2004	Oldboy	Johnnie To (Breaking News)	Christian Bale (The Machinist)	Mónica López (El Habitante Incierto)
2005	Hard Candy	Johnnie To (Election)	Lee Kang-sheng (The Wayward Cloud)	Lee Young-ae (Sympathy for Lady Vengeance)
2006	Requiem	Martin Weisz (Grimm Love)	Thomas Kretschmann, Thomas Huber (Grimm Love)	Sandra Hüller (Requiem)
2007	The Fall	Jaume Balagueró & Paco Plaza (REC)	Sam Rockwell (Joshua)	Manuela Velasco (REC)
2008	Surveillance	Kim Jee-woon (The Good, the Bad, the Weird)	Brian Cox (Red)	Semra Turan (Fighter)
2009	Moon	Brillante Mendoza (Kinatay)	Sam Rockwell (Moon)	Elena Anaya (Hierro), Kim Ok-vin (Thirst)
2010	Rare Exports: A Christmas Tale	Jalmari Helander (Rare Exports: A Christmas Tale)	Patrick Fabian (The Last Exorcism)	Josie Ho (Dream Home)
2011	Red State	Julia Leigh (Sleeping Beauty)	Michael Parks (Red State)	Brit Marling (Another Earth)
2012	Holy Motors	Léos Carax (Holy Motors)	Vincent D'Onofrio (Chained)	Alice Lowe (Sightseers)
2013	Borgman	Navot Papushado, Aharon Keshales (Big Bad Wolves)	Andy Lau (Blind Detective)	Juno Temple (Magic Magic)
2014	I Origins	Jonas Govaerts (Cub)	Nathan Phillips (These Final Hours), Kōji Yakusho (The World of Kanako)	Essie Davis (The Babadook), Julianne Moore (Maps to the Stars)
2015	The Invitation	S. Craig Zahler (Bone Tomahawk)	Joel Edgerton (The Gift)	Pili Groyne (The Brand New Testament)
2016	Swiss Army Man	Yeon Sang-ho (Train to Busan)	Daniel Radcliffe (Swiss Army Man)	Sennia Nanua (The Girl with All the Gifts)
2017	Jupiter's Moon	Coralie Fargeat (Revenge)	Rafe Spall (The Ritual)	Marsha Timothy (Marlina The Murderer In Four Acts)
2018	Climax	Panos Cosmatos (Mandy)	Hasan Majuni (Pig)	Andrea Riseborough (Nancy)
2019	The Platform	Kleber Mendonça Filho & Juliano Dornelles (Bacurau)	Miles Robbins (Daniel Isn't Real)	Imogen Poots (Vivarium)
2020	Possessor	Brandon Cronenberg (Possessor)	Grégoire Ludig, David Marsais (Mandibules)	Suliane Brahim (The Swarm)
2021	Lamb	Justin Kurzel (Nitram)	Franz Rogowski (Luzifer), Caleb Landry Jones (Nitram)	Susanne Jensen (Luzifer), Noomi Rapace (Lamb)
2022	Sisu	Ti West (Pearl)	Jorma Tommila (Sisu)	Mia Goth (Pearl)
2023	When Evil Lurks	Baloji (Omen)	Karim Leklou (Vincent Must Die)	Kate Lyn Sheil (The Seeding)
2024	The Devil's Bath	Soi Cheang (Twilight of the Warriors: Walled In)	John Lithgow & Geoffrey Rush (The Rule of Jenny Pen)	Kristine Froseth (Desert Road)
2025	The Ugly Stepsister	Park Chan-wook (No Other Choice)	Cast of The Plague	Rose Byrne (If I Had Legs I'd Kick You)

== See also ==
- List of fantastic and horror film festivals
- European Fantastic Film Festivals Federation
