= Irma Sztáray =

Hungarian countess (1863–1940)

- Countess Sztáray de Sztára et Nagymihály
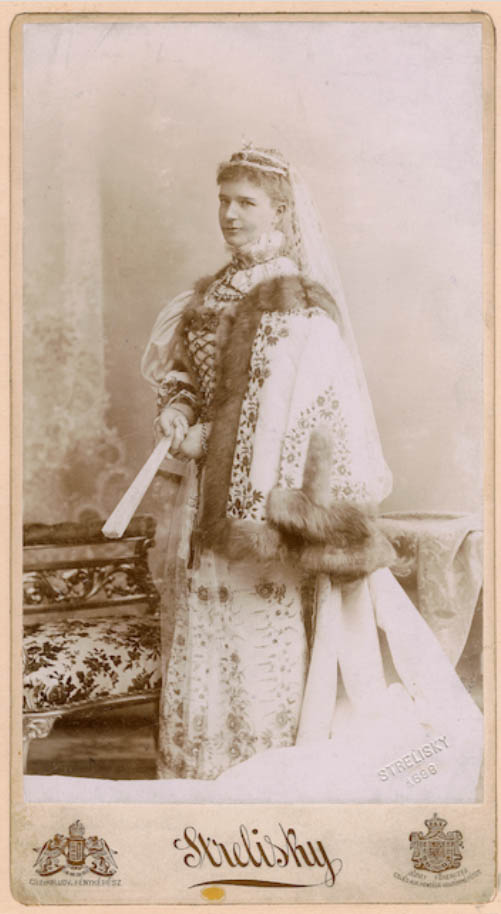
- Born: Irma Sztáray de Sztára et Nagymihály; 10 July 1863; Sztára, Kingdom of Hungary, Austrian Empire (today Staré, Slovakia)
- Died: 3 September 1940 (aged 77); Szobránc, Hungary (today Sobrance, Slovakia)
- Noble family: Sztáray
- Father: Count Viktor Sztáray de Sztára et Nagymihály
- Mother: Countess Mária Török de Szendrő

Countess Irma Sztáray de Sztára et Nagymihály (10 July 1863 – 3 September 1940) was a Hungarian noblewoman, courtier and memoirist. She was the last lady-in-waiting of Empress Elisabeth of Austria, and the sole companion traveling with the empress when she was assassinated.

== Early life ==
Irma was one of the children of Count Viktor Sztáray de Sztára et Nagymihály (1823–1879) and his wife, Countess Mária Török de Szendrõ (hu) (1835–1916), and had several elder siblings as well as one younger sister.

== Court lady ==
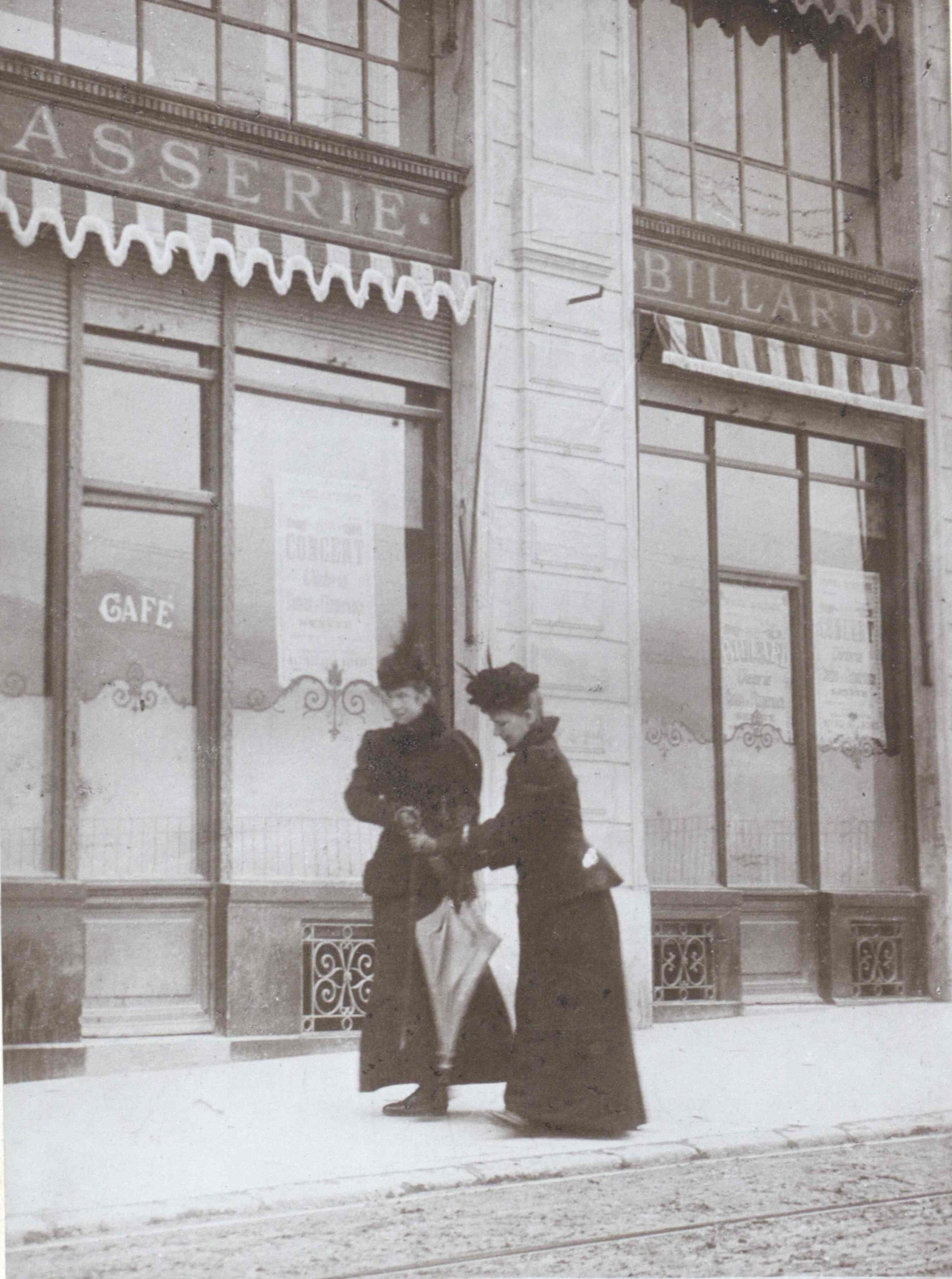
Last photograph taken of Empress Elisabeth of Austria-Hungary at Territet, Switzerland, with her lady in waiting Irma Sztáray (at right), on 3 September 1898, just one week before the Empress's death.

Sztáray got the position of lady in waiting at the Imperial court of Austria. She never married and had no children, as she dedicated her whole life to the Empress and the court. She accompanied Elisabeth during her last four years, from 1894 until 1898, on her journeys to Hungary, Italy, Switzerland, Algeria and Greece. Her memoirs Aus den letzten Jahren der Kaiserin Elisabeth, which she wrote many years after Empress Elisabeth's death, were published in German and are a valuable source which gives detailed insights into Sisi's final years.

For her services, Irma Sztáray received a medal of honour from Emperor Franz Joseph I right after Elisabeth's assassination.

== Later years ==
Following Empress Elisabeth's death, Sztáray traveled to Italy with her mother to recover from the tragedy. After returning home, she joined the Red Cross and helped care for the wounded in World War I as a nurse. In 1907, she donated the black silk jacket that Empress Elizabeth was wearing on the day of her death to the Queen Elizabeth Memorial Museum at the Buda Castle in Hungary.

Sztáray lived in seclusion in her family's castle in Szobránc, Hungary (today Sobrance, Slovakia) until her death. She died on 3 September 1940, at the age of 77.

== In popular culture ==
The 2023 German-Austrian-Swiss film Sisi & I, directed by Frauke Finsterwalder, tells the story of Empress Elisabeth of Austria from the point of view of Sztáray, who was portrayed by German actress Sandra Hüller.
