= Institute for Media and Communication Policy =

German research institution

- Institut für Medien- und Kommunikationspolitik
- Location: Cologne, Germany
- Website: www.medienpolitik.eu

The Institute for Media and Communication Policy (IfM) was founded in 2005 as an independent research institution that is exclusively dedicated to issues surrounding media and communication policies. It was established in February 2006 in Berlin-Charlottenburg, but in November 2014 it moved to Cologne. The institute is funded by leading German public and private media organizations.

== Benefactors ==
The institute is financially supported by various media organizations including ARD, ZDF, RTL, Sky Germany, Axel Springer AG, the publishing groups Verlagsgruppe Georg von Holtzbrinck, Der Spiegel and the Medienboard Berlin-Brandenburg (the regional Berlin Media and Film funding organization) among others. The Institute’s scientific advisory council consists of 25 reputable scholars, all of whom gained recognition in the field through media and communication policy-related publications. Lutz Hachmeister, a journalist and media scholar, is the founding director of the Institute. The institute has been established as a non-profit, limited liability company (gGmbH) operates independently, and has no political, party, or economic ties.

== Functions ==
According to its mission statement the IfM is “a forum for the media industry, research into communication and current politics”. It aims to offer “concrete models and options for the solution of mediapolitical challenges” as well as a framework for discussing these with representatives from the political sphere. Its aim is to gain recognition for the economic and public relevance as well as the strategic significance of media policies in modern politics. The principal task of the Institute is the continuous maintenance of an online media industry database (print-, radio-, TV- and online-media) compiling, amongst others, an annual ranking of the world’s most influential and successful media companies. Further research tasks include: - Establishing the theoretical and empirical foundation for a basic understanding of mediapolitical ideas and positions, as well as its specific terminologies - Research into the shifting correlation of print- and online media - Publication and editorial supervision of the “Jahrbuch Fernsehen” (German television yearbook).

The institute established its good reputation by hosting high ranking colloquiums on media policy. Among the speakers were guests such as: Greg Dyke (British Film Institute), Alan Rusbridger (Chief Editor of The Guardian), Norman Pearlstine (chief content officer of Bloomberg L.P.), Tyler Brûlé (founder of the Wallpaper* magazine), Mathias Müller von Blumencron and Georg Mascolo (Chief Editors of Der Spiegel), Ernst Uhrlau (President of the German Intelligence Service), Viviane Reding (EU-commissioner for information society and media), David Weinberger (fellow at the Berkman Center for Internet and Society at Harvard Law School), and technology scholars Evgeny Morozov and Geert Lovink. The IfM was elected one of the most important non-university institutes of media research within the framework of the programme “Germany thinks”, an initiative of the Goethe-Institut.

== Cologne Futures ==
Since 2012 the Institute annually organizes the Cologne Futures, until 2015 by the name Cologne Conference Futures. The conference discusses changes within the media-system - described as Media-evolution - and deals with Technology assessment in theory and practice. Richard Barbrook, Nick Bostrom, George Dyson, Kevin Kelly, Kathrin Passig and Tim Wu and other experts in the field gave talks on these topics. Since 2015 the conference is hosted in cooperation with the Academy of Media Arts Cologne. Main sponsor is the Deutsche Telekom. The talks are published and documented by the journal Medienkorrespondenz.

== See also ==
- List of universities, colleges, and research institutions in Berlin
