= In the Aisles =

2018 film

- Film poster
- Directed by: Thomas Stuber
- Written by: Thomas Stuber; Clemens Meyer
- Produced by: Jochen Laube; Fabian Maubach
- Starring: Franz Rogowski; Sandra Hüller
- Cinematography: Peter Matjasko
- Edited by: Kaya Inan
- Production companies: Sommerhaus Filmproduktionen; Departures Film; Arte; HR; MDR; SWR
- Distributed by: Zorro Film
- Release dates: 23 February 2018 (Berlin); 24 May 2018 (Germany)
- Running time: 125 minutes
- Country: Germany
- Language: German
- Box office: $671,495

In the Aisles (German: In den Gängen) is a 2018 German drama film, directed by Thomas Stuber, that looks at the lives of people filling shelves in an out-of-town supermarket. It was selected to compete for the Golden Bear in the main competition section at the 68th Berlin International Film Festival. At Berlin it won the Prize of the Ecumenical Jury award.

== Plot ==
In a huge new supermarket in the eastern provinces, a withdrawn young man called Christian is hired to help stock the drinks aisle. He works under the equally taciturn Bruno, who gruffly teaches him the job. He also catches the eye of the young blonde Marion, who looks after the confectionery aisle and considers herself a queen bee.

Christian falls for her, but lacks the skill to press his case. Other employees warn him that she is married unhappily to a husband who beats her. One morning he waits outside her house until her husband has gone to work and creeps in with a bunch of flowers. She is in her bath singing but, when she hears him coming up the stairs, he flees.

It emerges that his low self-esteem comes from teenage years in a gang, followed by prison. Bruno's unhappiness results from his loss of status at reunification, when all he could get was this low-grade job, and he hangs himself. Marion's malaise is not further explained, but she continues to flirt with Christian.

== Cast ==
- Franz Rogowski as Christian
- Sandra Hüller as Marion
- Peter Kurth as Bruno
- Henning Peker as Wolfgang
- Ramona Kunze-Libnow as Irina
- Andreas Leupold as Rudi
- Sascha Nathan as Johnny
- Michael Specht as Paletten-Klaus
- Matthias Brenner as Jürgen

== Reception ==
On review aggregator Rotten Tomatoes, the film holds an approval rating of 90% based on 39 reviews, with an average rating of 7.4/10. The site's critical consensus reads, "A gently beguiling workplace romance with real heart, In the Aisles elevates its relatable story with a pair of outstanding lead performances."
