= Frauke Finsterwalder =

German film director and screenwriter

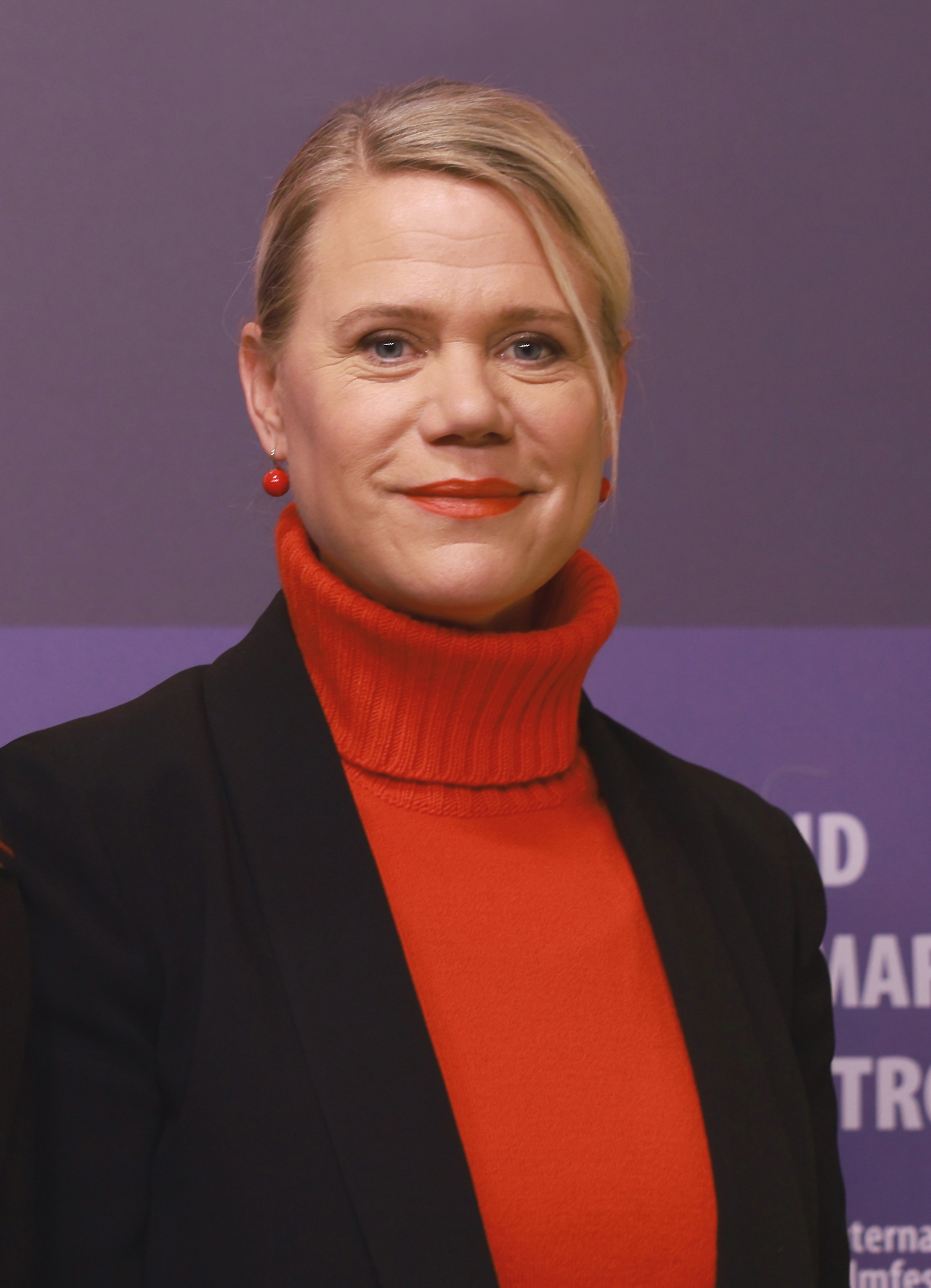
- Finsterwalder in 2023
- Born: 15 December 1975 (age 50); Hamburg, West Germany
- Occupations: Film director and screenwriter
- Years active: 2005–present
- Spouse: Christian Kracht (before 2010)
- Children: 1

Frauke Finsterwalder (German: [ˈfʁaʊkə ˈfɪnstɐvaldɐ]; born 15 December 1975) is a German film director and screenwriter. Finsterwalder has directed several shorts and documentaries. Her feature film directorial debut, Finsterworld, was released in 2013. For her second feature film, Sisi & I, released in 2023, she was awarded the Bavarian Film Award for Best Director.

== Early life ==
Finsterwalder spent part of her early life in the United States before studying literature and history at Humboldt University in Berlin.

== Career ==
Before beginning her career as a director, Finsterwalder worked as an assistant director at Berlin’s Volksbühne theatre and the Maxim Gorki Theatre. In addition to this, she worked as an editor for the German newspaper Süddeutsche Zeitung before returning to study documentary film direction at the Hochschule für Fernsehen und Film München in Munich. In 2005 Finsterwalder directed her first short film, 0.003 km.

Finsterwalder cites films by directors Wes Anderson, Terrence Malick and Paul Verhoeven amongst influences for her debut feature film. She frequently casts Sandra Hüller in her films and frequently works with editor Andreas Menn.

== Documentary films ==
=== Weil der Mensch ein Mensch ist ===
After directing her first short, Finsterwalder worked with Stephan Hilpert to direct Weil der Mensch ein Mensch ist ('Because a man is human'). This film, whose title is derived from the lyrics of the United Front Song (Das Einheitsfrontlied) by Bertolt Brecht and Hanns Eisler, deals with the inculcation of democracy in young people. It received very positive press upon its release in 2007.

=== Die große Pyramide ===
In 2010, Finsterwalder directed her second documentary film, Die große Pyramide ('The Great Pyramid'). This documentary follows the plans of a group of young men, including German writer Ingo Niermann, who set out to build the largest man-made structure in history: a gigantic Great Pyramid Monument that would be built in fields in eastern Germany and would serve as both a tourist attraction and as the final resting place of over a billion people.

== Finsterworld ==
Finsterwalder’s first feature-length film Finsterworld, which was co-written by the Swiss writer Christian Kracht, was premiered at the Munich Film Festival in July 2013. The film follows the interwoven stories of twelve central characters played, amongst others, by Sandra Hüller, Jakub Gierszał, Ronald Zehrfeld, Margit Carstensen, Carla Juri, Michael Maertens and Corinna Harfouch.

=== Reception and acclaim ===
Finsterworld has been shown in many countries across the world to critical acclaim. It received the Zenith Award for best debut picture at the Montréal World Film Festival and also received the award for Best Feature Film at the Cologne Conference. At the 2013 Zurich Film Festival, Finsterwalder received a Golden Eye award for Best German Language Film as well as the Swiss Film Critics’ Award. The film also received the award for Best Picture at the 2014 Vancouver International Women In Film Festival., as well as winning best female-directed narrative at the 2014 Edinburgh International Film Festival. The film received nominations in five categories for the 2014 Deutscher Filmpreis German Academy awards: Best Picture, Best Screenplay, Best Supporting Actress, Best Supporting Actor and Best Musical Score. Sandra Hüller received the Lola award for Best Supporting Actress for her role in the film.

== Sisi & I ==
Finsterwalder's next feature film, Sisi & I, is a retelling of the later years of Empress Elisabeth of Austria from the point of view of her lady-in-waiting, Irma Sztáray. The cast includes Sandra Hüller, who starred in Finsterwalder's previous film, Finsterworld, as well as Susanne Wolff, Tom Rhys Harries, Stefan Kurt, Georg Friedrich, Angela Winkler and Johanna Wokalek. The film premiered at the 73rd Berlin Film Festival on 19 February 2023, and was released in Germany on 30 March 2023.

In June 2023, Finsterwalder was awarded the Bavarian Film Award for Best Director for Sisi & I.

== Personal life ==
Finsterwalder is married to the Swiss writer Christian Kracht, with whom she has a daughter who was born in 2009. The family has been living in Zurich since 2020.

== Filmography ==
=== Feature films ===
- 2013: Finsterworld
- 2023: Sisi & I
- 2026: Eurotrash

=== Documentaries ===
- 2007: Because a Man is Human
- 2010: The Great Pyramid

=== Short film ===
- 2005: 0.003 km

=== Television ===
- 2007: Fremde Kinder (TV series, 1 episode)

== Awards and nominations ==
| Year | Award / Festival | Category | Nominated work | Result | Ref. |
|---|---|---|---|---|---|
| 2013 | Camerimage | Best Directoral Debut | Finsterworld | Nominated | |
| 2013 | Film Festival Cologne | TV Spielfilm-Prize | Finsterworld | Won | |
| 2013 | Montreal World Film Festival | Bronze Zenith | Finsterworld | Won | |
| 2013 | Montreal World Film Festival | Golden Zenith | Finsterworld | Nominated | |
| 2013 | Zurich Film Festival | Best German Language Feature Film | Finsterworld | Won | |
| 2013 | Zurich Film Festival | Critic's Choice Award | Finsterworld | Won | |
| 2014 | Edinburgh International Film Festival | Best Female-Directed Narrative | Finsterworld | Won | |
| 2014 | German Film Awards | Best Screenplay | Finsterworld | Nominated | |
| 2014 | German Film Critics Association Awards | Best Feature Film Debut | Finsterworld | Nominated | |
| 2014 | German Film Critics Association Awards | Best Film | Finsterworld | Nominated | |
| 2014 | Jerusalem Film Festival | International First Film | Finsterworld | Nominated | |
| 2014 | Jupiter Award | Best German Film | Finsterworld | Nominated | |
| 2014 | New Faces Awards, Germany | Director Award | Finsterworld | Nominated | |
| 2014 | Saas Fee Filmfest | Critic's Choice Award | Finsterworld | Won | |
| 2023 | 73rd Berlin Film Festival | Panorama Audience Award for Best Feature Film | Sisi & I | Nominated | |
| 2023 | 73rd Berlin Film Festival | Teddy Award – Best LGBT Feature Film | Sisi & I | Nominated | |
| 2023 | Bavarian Film Awards | Best Director | Sisi & I | Won | |
| 2023 | Camerimage | Director's Debuts Competition | Sisi & I | Nominated | |
