= Luzifer (film) =

2021 Austrian dramatic horror film

- Directed by: Peter Brunner
- Written by: Peter Brunner
- Produced by: Ulrich Seidl
- Starring: Susanne Jensen; Franz Rogowski; Monika Hinterhuber
- Cinematography: Peter Flinckenberg
- Music by: Tim Hecker
- Production company: Ulrich Seidl Filmproduktion
- Distributed by: Film Republic; Drop-Out Cinema; Stadtkino Filmverleih
- Release date: 11 August 2021 (Locarno Festival)
- Running time: 103 minutes
- Country: Austria
- Language: German

Luzifer is a 2021 Austrian supernatural horror drama film written and directed by Peter Brunner. Starring Susanne Jensen and Franz Rogowski, the film centers on a man who lives in a secluded alpine hut with his mother and his pet eagle, their relative peace and faith shattered as strange and increasingly sinister supernatural occurrences begin to unfold around them.

The film had its world premiere in August 2021 at the Locarno Filmfestival, before premiering in the United States at Fantastic Fest the following month. There Franz Rogowski received the award for the best actor for his role as "Johannes". In October 2021, Rogowski was awarded Best Actor for this role ex-aequo with Caleb Landrey Jones (Nitram) at the Sitges Filmfestival. Also Susanne Jensen was awarded Best Actress for her role as "Maria" ex-aequo with Noomi Rapace (Lamb) at the Sitges Filmfestival.

== Plot ==
Maria (Susanne Jensen) lives secluded in the mountains with her mentally handicapped adult son Johannes (Franz Rogowski). Her husband died. Their everyday life is determined by religious rituals and familiarity. Johannes' best friend is the eagle Arthur. When the area is to be converted into a ski resort, the devil awakens. Maria tries to protect her son. Faith, trust, powerlessness and childishness become an explosive mixture. Is an exorcism the solution? Where is the devil?

== Cast ==
- Susanne Jensen as Maria
- Franz Rogowski as Johannes
- Monika Hinterhuber as Vet
- Theo Blaickner as Theo
- Erwin Geisler as Landvermesser
- Clemens Göbl as Landvermesser
- Markus Eibl as Einsiedler

== Reception ==
Critical response for Luzifer has been mostly positive, with many critics praising the film for its performances, atmosphere, and mature themes. Noel Murray of Los Angeles Times praised Rogowski's performance and cinematograph, calling it "an unflinching, Werner Herzog-style portrait of people living on society’s fringes".

== Awards ==
- 2021: Boccalino d'Oro for director Peter Brunner in Locarno Filmfestival
- 2021: Best Actor for Franz Rogowski (Luzifer and Freaks Out) Fantastic Fest, Austin
- 2021: Best Actress for Susanne Jensen ex-aequo with Noomi Rapace (Lamb) at Sitges Film Festival
- 2021: Best Actor for Franz Rogowski ex-aequo with Caleb Landrey Jones (Nitram) at Sitges Film Festival
- 2022: Best Feature Film at Pendance Film Festival, Toronto, Canada
