= Above Us Only Sky =

2011 film

- Directed by: Jan Schomburg
- Written by: Jan Schomburg
- Produced by: Christoph Friedel; Claudia Steffen
- Starring: Sandra Hüller; Georg Friedrich
- Cinematography: Marc Comes
- Edited by: Bernd Euscher
- Music by: Steven Schwalbe; Tobias Wagner
- Distributed by: Real Fiction
- Release dates: 28 May 2011 (Seattle International Film Festival); 15 September 2011 (Germany)
- Running time: 88 minutes
- Country: Germany
- Language: German

Above Us Only Sky (German: Über uns das All) is a 2011 German drama film, directed by Jan Schomburg. It tells the story of a young woman who undergoes three major shocks at once: the husband she loves is found dead; it was suicide; and his whole life outside their marriage was a fraud.

== Plot ==
In Cologne, Martha and Paul live happily together. She teaches in a school and he is studying medicine at the university, having handed in his thesis to Professor Gellendorf and secured a job in Marseille. While she packs up to join him there, he drives on ahead.

Shortly after, the police call on Martha. Paul has been found dead in his car in Marseille, the verdict being suicide. Disbelieving them, she leaves increasingly frantic messages on his cellphone. Then they give her his personal effects, minus the phone, and she has to organise a funeral for the repatriated body.

At this point, she realises that she cannot ask his family or friends because she has never met any of them and that his whole life outside their relationship was a mystery. The only name she knows is Professor Gellendorf, so she calls on him. He says he has not seen Paul for at least four years and has not seen any thesis. Nobody else she asks at the university can recall seeing Paul.

She starts looking for contemporaries who might remember him and approaches a history lecturer called Alexander. Physically he reminds her of Paul and, persuading him back to her flat, she gets into bed and tells him to join her. He suggests another day might be better, so she asks him to dinner and the two become lovers.

He is completely unaware that she has just lost her husband and she never asks about his life (he has an affectionate girl friend who is badly hurt at losing him). One day when they are in her flat, her phone rings and the name on the screen is Paul. It is somebody in Marseille calling to say they have found his phone. Realising some of the truth, Alexander leaves her and she now begins grieving for Paul.

In a postscript, they have got together again, moved to Marseille, and Martha looks pregnant.

== Cast ==
- Sandra Hüller as Martha Sabel
- Georg Friedrich as Alexander Runge
- Felix Knopp as Paul Sabel
- Kathrin Wehlisch as Trixi
- Valery Tscheplanowa as Anja
- Stephan Grossmann as Bruno Heimann
- Aljoscha Stadelmann as Bernd
- Piet Fuchs as Undertaker Soltau
- Martin Reinke as Professor Gellendorf

== Awards ==
- Won 61st Berlin International Film Festival - Label Europa Cinemas (Jan Schomburg)
- Won German Film Critics Association Awards - Best Actress (Sandra Huller)
- Nominated German Film Awards - Best Performance by an Actress in a Leading Role (Sandra Huller)

Won *Best Soundtrack* Michael Bennett, ‘The Skies Above us’
