= Bavarian Film Awards (Best Director) =

This is a list of the winners of the Bavarian Film Awards for Best Director.

== Best Director ==
- 1981 Thomas Brasch, Wolfgang Petersen
- 1982 Percy Adlon
- 1983 Peter Schamoni
- 1984 Carl Schenkel
- 1985 Xaver Schwarzenberger
- 1987 Wim Wenders
- 1989 Uli Edel
- 1991 Percy Adlon, Michael Klier
- 1992 Helmut Dziuba, Juraj Herz
- 1993 Wim Wenders
- 1995 Rainer Kaufmann
- 1996 Helmut Dietl
- 1997 Joseph Vilsmaier, Sönke Wortmann
- 1998 Max Färberböck
- 1999 Rolf Schübel
- 2000 Oliver Hirschbiegel
- 2001 Peter Sehr
- 2002 Andreas Dresen
- 2003 Sönke Wortmann
- 2005 Andreas Dresen
- 2006 Tom Tykwer
- 2007 Fatih Akın
- 2008 Caroline Link
- 2009 Juraj Herz
- 2010 Tom Tykwer
- 2011 Doris Dörrie
- 2012 Michael Haneke
- 2013 Andreas Prochaska
- 2014 Baran bo Odar
- 2015 Kai Wessel
- 2016 Maren Ade, Nicolette Krebitz, Maria Schrader, Marie Noëlle, Franziska Meletzky
- 2017 Fatih Akin
- 2018 Caroline Link
- 2019 Sherry Hormann
- 2020 Tim Fehlbaum, Julia von Heinz
- 2021 Dominik Graf
- 2022 Frauke Finsterwalder
- 2023 Alireza Golafshan
- 2024 Ayşe Polat
- 2025 Mascha Schilinski

== Best Director (Low Budget) ==
- 1987 Hans Noever

== Best New Director ==
- 1979 Dominik Graf
- 1980 Peter F. Bringmann
- 1985 Wolfram Paulus
- 1986 Peter Timm
- 1988 Nico Hoffmann
- 1988 Robert Sigl
- 1988 Maria Theresia Wagner
- 1989 Uwe Janson
- 1989 Berthold Mittermayr
- 1991 Detlev Buck
- 1991 Sherry Hormann
- 1993 Katja von Garnier
- 1994 Tom Tykwer
- 1996 Caroline Link
- 1998 Fatih Akın
- 1998 Marc Rothemund
- 1999 Veit Helmer
- 2000 Esther Gronenborn
- 2001 Zoltan Spirandelli
- 2002 Chris Kraus
- 2006 Marcus H. Rosenmüller
- 2007 Ralf Westhoff
- 2008 Jan Fehse
- 2010 Benjamin Heisenberg
- 2011 Sebastian Stern
- 2012 David Wnendt
- 2013 Michaela Kezele
- 2014 Katrin Gebbe
- 2015 Tomasz Emil Rudzik
- 2016 Uisenma Borchu
- 2017 Jakob M. Erwa
- 2018 Adrian Goiginger
- 2019 Kerstin Polte
