= Marie von Kleist =

German courtier

Marie von Kleist (1761–1831) was a German courtier. She served as lady-in-waiting to Queen Louise of Mecklenburg-Strelitz the Queen of Prussia. She was the close confidante and favorite of the queen, and is also known as the benefactor of her cousin Heinrich von Kleist.
