= Finsterworld =

2013 German motion picture drama

- Film poster
- Directed by: Frauke Finsterwalder
- Written by: Frauke Finsterwalder; Christian Kracht
- Starring: Margit Carstensen; Sandra Hüller; Corinna Harfouch; Christoph Bach; Carla Juri; Jakub Gierszał
- Release date: August 30, 2013 (Montréal World Film Festival)
- Country: Germany
- Language: German

Finsterworld is a 2013 German cringe comedy drama directed by Frauke Finsterwalder, her debut feature film. Co-written by Finsterwalder and Christian Kracht, it follows interconnected, parallel stories over the course of one day in Germany.

The title Finsterworld is a play on Finsterwalder's surname, which can be translated to English as "from the dark forest (cf forest ~ wood)". It is not to be confused with the Dutch village of Finsterwolde, indeed meaning "dark forest", "dark wood". Finsterwalders ancestry might well be traced back to this village, given its proximity to the German border, the fact that Dutch 'Finsterwolder' also means "from Finsterwolde" and German "wald" has the same root as Dutch "wold(e), woud(e)", common parts of toponyms both in the Netherlands and in Germany.

== Premise ==
Finsterworld is an ensemble piece with twelve main characters who are gradually shown to interconnect with each other. These include a pedicurist, three generations of the Sandberg family, and a documentarist and her policeman boyfriend, who is secretly a furry.

== Cast ==
- Christoph Bach as Lehrer Nickel
- Margit Carstensen as Frau Sandberg
- Jakub Gierszał as Maximillian Sandberg
- Corinna Harfouch as Inga Sandberg
- Sandra Hüller as Franziska Feldenhoven
- Carla Juri as Natalie
- Johannes Krisch as Einsiedler
- Michael Maertens as Claude Petersdorf
- Dieter Meier as Furrier
- Max Pellney as Jonas
- Leonard Scheicher as Dominik
- Bernard Schütz as Georg Sandberg
- Ronald Zehrfeld as Tom

== Production and release ==
The film was shot at various locations in Bavaria and Tanzania.

Its world premiere was at the 2013 Montréal World Film Festival.

It opened in German cinemas in October 2013, in Austria in January 2014 and in Switzerland in March 2014.

== Soundtrack ==
The film features an original score by composer Michaela Melián, singer of the German new wave band FSK, and is bookended by the song "The Wind" by Cat Stevens.

== Critical response ==
The Hollywood Reporter praised its "sophisticated screenplay", "beautiful camerawork" and "very solid line-up of actors". Die Welt called it a "masterpiece".

== Awards ==
It won the Bronze Zenith at the 2013 Montréal World Film Festival, as well as the 2013 TV-Spielfilm-Award at Germany’s Cologne Conference. At the 2013 Zurich Film Festival, it won the Critics' Choice award, and prize for the best German-language feature film. The film was nominated for best fiction debut at Camerimage festival in Poland. It has also garnered nominations for best feature film debut at Munich’s 2013 Filmfest München and three nominations for the 2013 Preis der deutschen Filmkritik, winning best German screenplay, as well as five nominations for the Deutscher Filmpreis, with Sandra Hüller winning best supporting actress. In 2014, it won best female directed film at Edinburgh International Film Festival, as well as a nomination for the Fipresci Prize at the Jerusalem Film Festival.
