= Sandra Hüller =

German actress (born 1978)

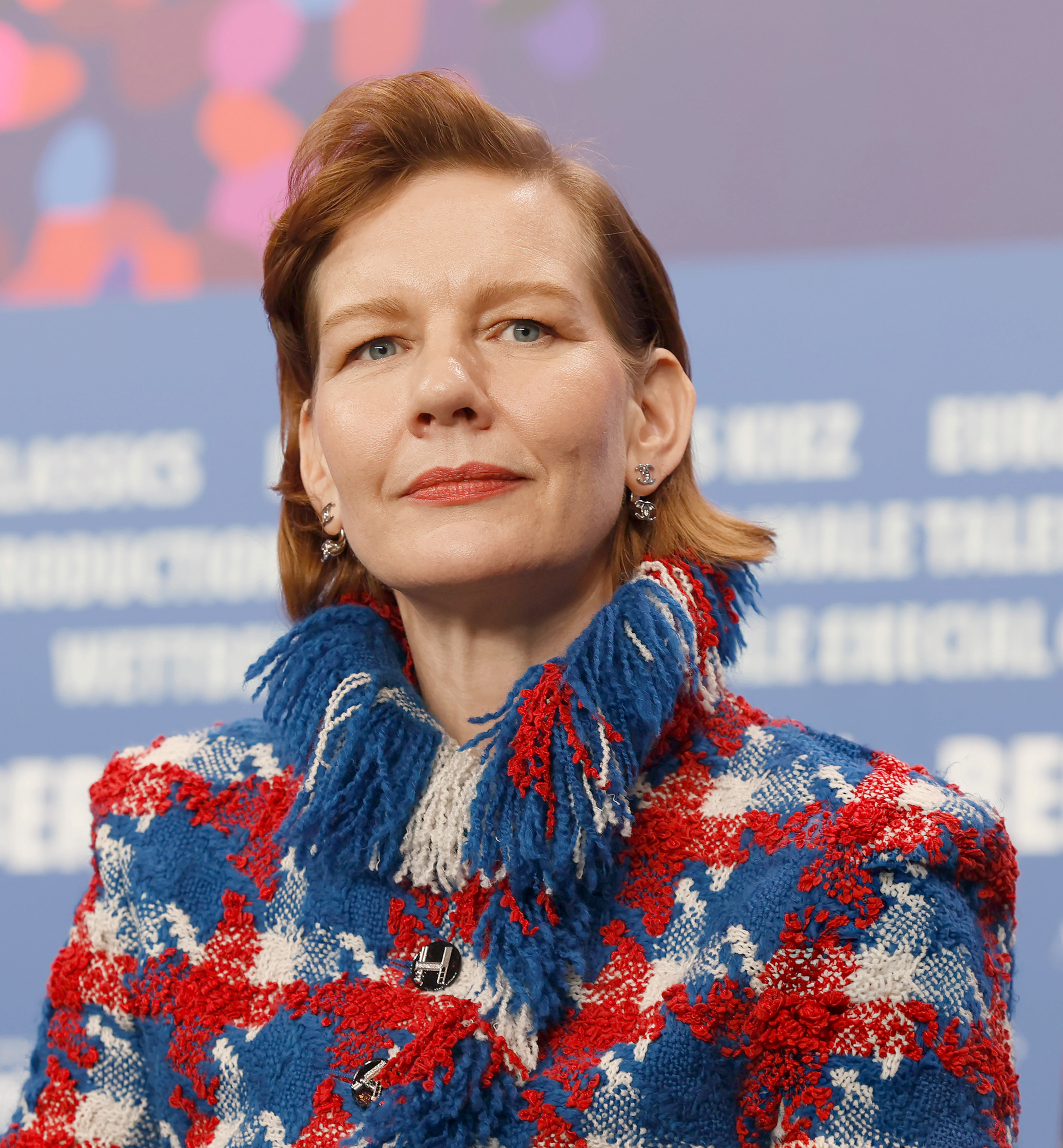
- Hüller at the 2026 Berlin Film Festival
- Born: 30 April 1978 (age 48); Suhl, East Germany (now Germany)
- Education: Ernst Busch Academy of Dramatic Arts
- Occupation: Actress
- Years active: 1998–present
- Children: 1
- Awards: Full list

Sandra Hüller (German: [ˈzandʁa ˈhʏlɐ]; born 30 April 1978) is a German actress. She has received various accolades, including two Silver Bears and a César Award along with nominations for an Academy Award, two BAFTAs, and a Golden Globe Award.

Hüller made her film debut in 1999. She won the Silver Bear for Best Actress for her performance as a woman based on the case of Anneliese Michel in Hans-Christian Schmid's drama Requiem (2006), later taking leading roles in the Maren Ade's comedy Toni Erdmann (2016) and Frauke Finsterwalder's historical black comedy Sisi & I (2023).

International recognition came in 2023 for her starring roles in Justine Triet's legal drama Anatomy of a Fall and Jonathan Glazer's Holocaust drama The Zone of Interest (both released in 2023). Her performance in the former won a César Award as well as nomination for the Academy Award for Best Actress. In 2026, she appears in the science-fiction comedy-drama Project Hail Mary, along with the Paweł Pawlikowski drama Fatherland, the Alejandro G. Iñárritu satire Digger, and several other films. She won the Silver Bear for Best Leading Performance for playing a female soldier disguised as a man in Markus Schleinzer's 2026 drama Rose.

She also sings and composes music, and in 2020 released an album entitled Be Your Own Prince.

== Early life and education ==
Sandra Hüller was born on 30 April 1978 in Suhl, Bezirk Suhl (in today's Thuringia), East Germany, and grew up in Oberhof and Friedrichroda, small villages in the heavily forested state of Thuringia. She is the elder of two children, with parents who were educators; her father taught at a centre for apprentices, and her mother gave after-school tutoring.

Hüller cut her hair, dyed it red, and joined a drama club as a teenager. She also participated in the theatre workshop at school, but did not consider becoming a professional actor at that time. In high school, Hüller had her stage debut with the 1996 production Wir Voodookinder directed by Robert Lehniger at the Theatertreffen der Jugend in Berlin.

From 1996, Hüller studied acting at the Ernst Busch Academy of Dramatic Arts in Berlin, graduating in 2003.

== Acting career ==
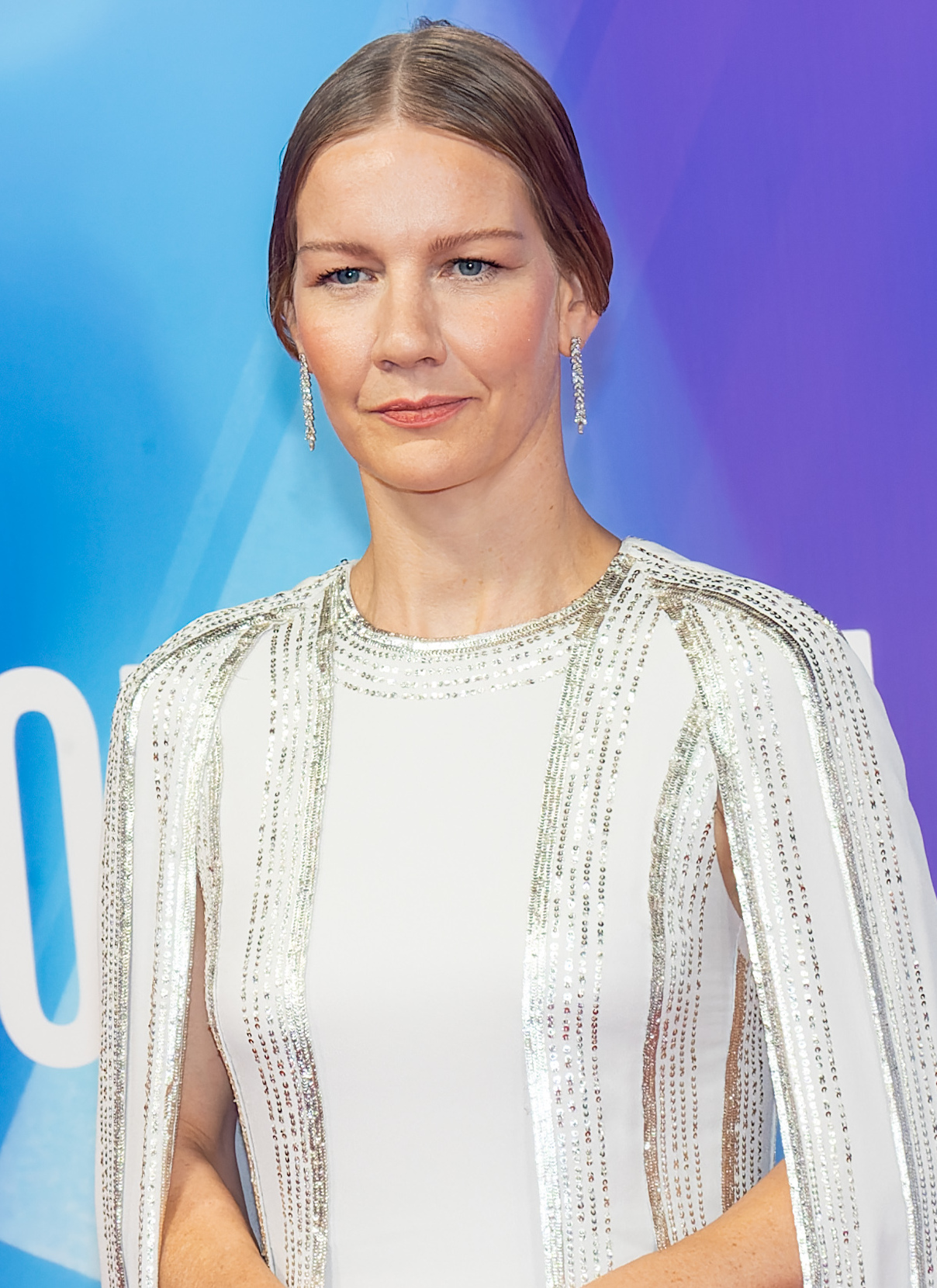
Hüller in 2023

=== Early career (1998–2016) ===
Hüller appeared from 1998 to 2001 at the Theaterhaus Jena in Jena, Thuringia, and then for one year at the Schauspiel Leipzig. It was Oliver Held, a playwright from Jena, who recommended her to the Theater Basel in Basel, Switzerland, where she appeared until 2006. In 2006, Hüller appeared as Michaela Klingler in Hans-Christian Schmid's film Requiem, for which she won the 56th Berlin International Film Festival's Award for Best Actress and her first German Film Award. In 2009, Hüller appeared as Elizabeth I in Virgin Queen at Prater Volksbühne theatre, and in the music theatre show For Love, directed by Tom Schneider, based on the works of Kurt Cobain and Courtney Love.

In 2012, at the 62nd Berlin International Film Festival, Hüller was – alongside Emily Jacir and David OReilly – part of the jury that chose Justine Triet's Vilaine Fille Mauvais Garçon as the festival's best short film. From 2012 to 2015, Hüller was a member of the company at the Munich Kammerspiele, where she worked with director Johan Simons on several plays, notably Elfriede Jelinek's Die Straße. Die Stadt. Der Überfall. in 2013. In 2016, Hüller co-founded the FARN.collective theatre group.

In 2018, Hüller became a member of the company at the Schauspiel Bochum, again working with Johan Simons, and played the lead role in Simons' adaptation of Penthesilea in Bochum and at the Salzburg Festival. In 2019, Hüller appeared in Johan Simons' award-winning, gender-switched version of Hamlet. In 2019, Hüller was part of the 69th Berlin International Film Festival's jury, chaired by Juliette Binoche. Later in 2019, she appeared in two French films, Justine Triet's Sibyl, where she played film director Mika, and in Alice Winocour's Proxima as the psychologist Wendy.

=== 2020s ===
In 2023, Hüller portrayed Countess Irma Sztáray in Frauke Finsterwalder's historical black comedy film Sisi & I, a retelling of the later years of Empress Elisabeth of Austria from the point of view of her lady-in-waiting. The film had its world premiere at the 73rd Berlin Film Festival on 19 February 2023, and was released in Germany on 30 March 2023. Hüller was nominated for the German Film Award for Best Actress for her performance in the film.

In 2023, Hüller starred in two films that premiered in main competition at the 2023 Cannes Film Festival; the French legal drama Anatomy of a Fall by Justine Triet, which won the Palme d'Or, and the American-British-Polish Holocaust drama The Zone of Interest by Jonathan Glazer, which won the Grand Prix. Both films brought her international recognition. She won her second European Film Award for Best Actress for Anatomy of a Fall, while also being nominated for The Zone of Interest. She also earned Academy Award and Golden Globe nominations for Anatomy of a Fall, as well as BAFTA Film Award nominations for both Anatomy of a Fall and The Zone of Interest. She also won the César Award for Best Actress for Anatomy of a Fall.

In May 2024, Variety reported that Hüller would begin filming Late Fame in New York City that fall, starring alongside Willem Dafoe; by October, Greta Lee replaced her due to scheduling conflicts.

In April 2025, Hüller made her stage directorial debut, co-directing Penthesile:a:s by Marie Dilasser with Tom Schneider at the Neues Theater Halle as part of their FARN.collective.

In 2026, Hüller starred in four films. In Markus Schleinzer's Rose she portrayed a middle-aged woman disguised as a man, who appears in a secluded Protestant village. For her performance, Hüller received critical acclaim, winning the Silver Bear for Best Leading Performance. She also played the role of Eva Stratt in Phil Lord and Christopher Miller's Project Hail Mary, an adaptation of Andy Weir's 2021 novel of the same name. She was the lead role as the daughter of German writer Thomas Mann in Fatherland, a drama by Pawel Pawlikowski which premiered at the 2026 Cannes Film Festival to critical acclaim, and co-starred in Digger as the half-sister of Tom Cruise's titular character.

== Music ==
Hüller wrote a lot of music as a young woman. She has sung live on stage, including covers of songs by Cyndi Lauper and Billie Eilish in a stage adaptation of Luis Buñuel's film The Exterminating Angel in 2024, and singing 26 PJ Harvey songs at the Ruhrtriennale arts festival in Germany.

In 2020, Hüller released her debut album, Be Your Own Prince, accompanied by at least one music video. The album was released on Akkerbouw Records on 24 July 2020, and features seven tracks written and sung by Hüller, who also plays guitar and kalimba on the recording.

In the 2026 film Project Hail Mary, she sings the Harry Styles song "Sign of the Times", which she chose herself after the directors, on the suggestion of lead actor Ryan Gosling, asked her to, in a karaoke scene.

== Other activities ==
In 2024, Hüller appeared in the first-ever advertising campaign of Phoebe Philo's eponymous fashion brand. During Paris Fashion Week in 2025, she opened the fashion show of Miu Miu. Since 2026, she has been a brand ambassador for Chanel.

In July 2024, Hüller christened the ship Sea-Eye 5 for the Sea-Eye NGO in Ancona and criticised the European migration policy in an interview.

== Personal life ==
Hüller speaks German, English, French, and Spanish.

She considers Thuringia as home, although has not continued to reside there. She has a daughter.

Hüller is a licensed forklift operator, after becoming certified for a role in Thomas Stuber's In the Aisles.

== Filmography ==
=== Film ===
Year	Title	Role	Notes	Ref.
1999	Nicht auf den Mund	Daisy	Short film	
1999	Midsommar Stories	Beatrice	Segment: "Sabotage"	
2006	Requiem	Michaela Klingler		
2006	Kühe lächeln mit den Augen	Julia		
2006	Madonnas	Rita		
2008	Where in This World		Short film	
2008	A Woman in Berlin	Steffi		
2008	The Architect	Reh Winter		
2009	Roentgen	Charlotte	Short film	
2009	Fly	Sarah	Short film	
2009	Germany 09	Ulrike Meinhof	Segment: "Die Unvollendete"	
2009	Miss Stinnes Motors Round the World	Clärenore Stinnes		
2009	Henri 4	Catherine of Bourbon		
2010	Brownian Movement	Charlotte		
2010	Aghet – Ein Völkermord	Tacy Atkinson	Documentary	
2011	Above Us Only Sky	Martha Sabel		
2012	Fluss	Mother	Short film	
2012	Strings	Mother		
2013	Finsterworld	Franziska Feldenhoven		
2014	Lose My Self	Frauke, Lena's friend		
2014	Amour Fou	Marie von Kleist		
2016	Toni Erdmann	Ines Conradi		
2017	Don't	Superhero	Short film	
2017	Fack ju Göhte 3	Biggi Enzberger		
2018	In the Aisles	Marion Koch		
2018	25 km/h	Tanja		
2019	Sibyl	Mikaela "Mika" Sanders		
2019	Proxima	Wendy Hauer		
2019	Exile	Nora		
2020	Sleep	Marlene		
2021	I'm Your Man	Employee		
2021	Munich – The Edge of War	Helen Winter		
2022	The Black Square	Martha		
2022	Talking About the Weather	Clara		
2023	Sisi & I	Irma Sztáray		
2023	Anatomy of a Fall	Sandra Voyter		
2023	The Zone of Interest	Hedwig Höss		
2024	Two to One	Maren		
2025	Underland	Narrator	Documentary	
2026	Rose	Rose		
2026	Project Hail Mary	Eva Stratt		
2026	Fatherland	Erika Mann		
2026	Ingeborg Bachmann	Ingeborg Bachmann	Documentary	
2026	Digger	Emma Rockwell		
2026	Avengers: Doomsday		Post-production	
2028	Work and Structure	Wolfgang Herrndorf	Pre-production	

=== Television ===
Year	Title	Role	Notes
2011	Der Kriminalist	Conny Lojewski	1 episode
2013	Pinocchio	Fox	Miniseries
2014	Polizeiruf 110	Karen Wagner	1 episode
2016	Crime Scene Cleaner	Silke Hansen	1 episode
2024	Zeit Verbrechen	Susanne Meierhof	1 episode

== Voice roles ==
=== Radio ===
- 2013: Paul Plamper: Der Kauf, produced by Westdeutscher Rundfunk, Bayerischer Rundfunk, Deutschlandfunk and Schauspiel Köln
- 2016: Franz Kafka, Das Schloss, produced by Bayerischer Rundfunk and Hörspiel und Medienkunst
- 2017: Paul Plamper: Dienstbare Geister, produced by Westdeutscher Rundfunk, Bayerischer Rundfunk, Deutschlandfunk, Mitteldeutscher Rundfunk, Ruhrtriennale and Maxim Gorki Theater
- 2021: Kirsten Becken: Ihre Geister sehen, produced by Deutschlandfunk

=== Audiobook ===
- 2013: Finn-Ole Heinrich: Die erstaunlichen Abenteuer der Maulina Schmitt – Mein kaputtes Königreich. (Hörcompany)
- 2014: Finn-Ole Heinrich: Die erstaunlichen Abenteuer der Maulina Schmitt – Warten auf Wunder. (Hörcompany)
- 2015: Finn-Ole Heinrich: Die erstaunlichen Abenteuer der Maulina Schmitt – Ende des Universums (Hörcompany)
- 2015: Karen Köhler: Wir haben Raketen geangelt (tacheles!/Roof Music)
- 2017: Mariana Leky: Was man von hier aus sehen kann (tacheles!/Roof Music)
- 2018: Wolfgang Herrndorf: Bilder deiner großen Liebe: Ein großer Monolog mit Musik (tacheles!/Roof Music)
- 2019: Mariana Leky: Die Herrenausstatterin (tacheles!/Roof Music)
- 2019: Mariana Leky: Erste Hilfe (tacheles!/Roof Music)

== Awards and nominations ==
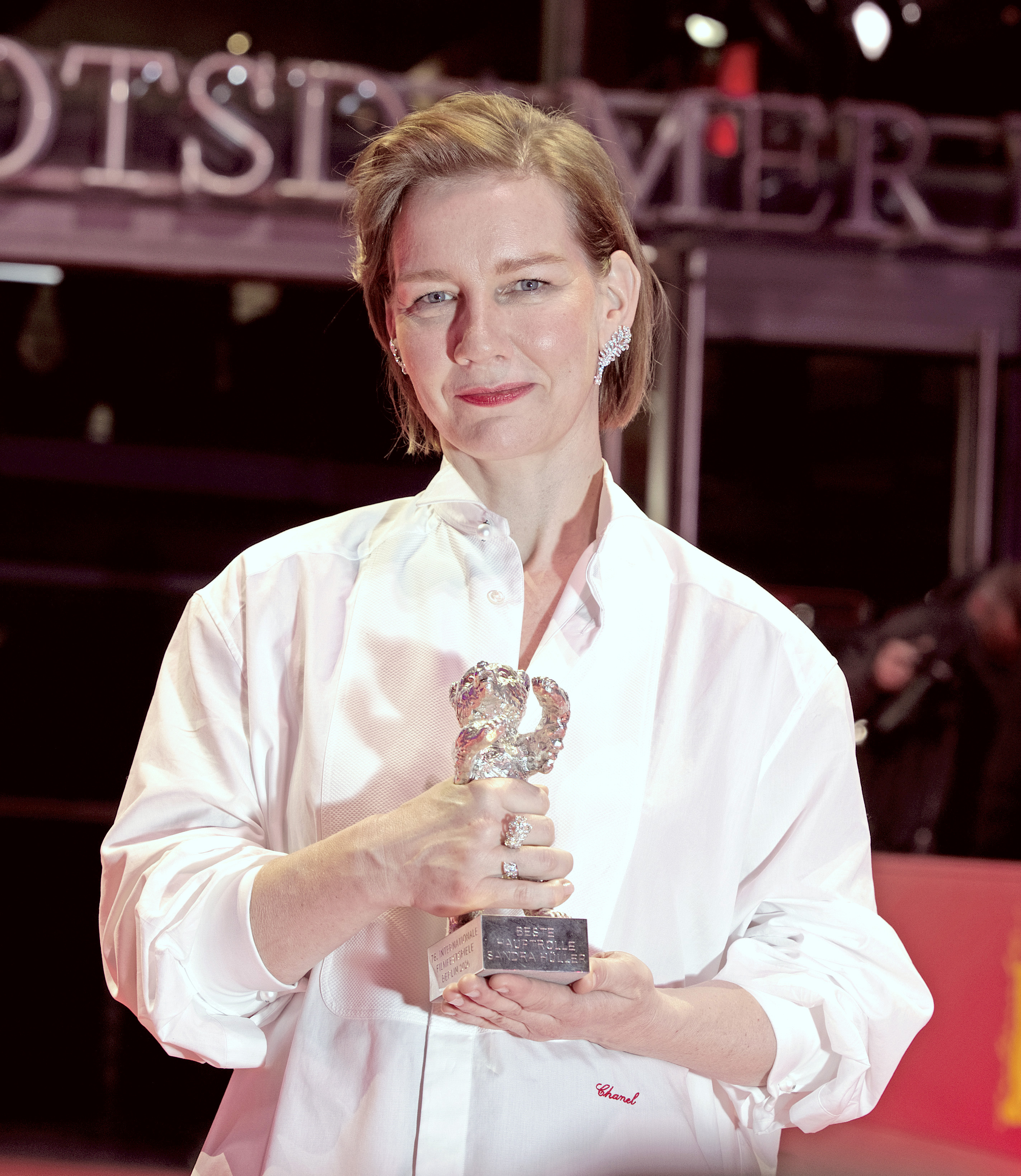
Hüller with the Silver Bear for her performance in Rose at the 2026 Berlinale

In 2014, Hüller won the German Film Award for Best Supporting Actress for her portrayal of Franziska Feldenhoven in Frauke Finsterwalder's film Finsterworld. Hüller accepted the invitation to become a member of Berlin's Academy of Arts in 2017. In October 2020, she was appointed to the Order of Merit of the Federal Republic of Germany. For Anatomy of a Fall (2023), Hüller became the third German actress to be nominated for the Academy Award for Best Actress, and the first German actress to be nominated since Luise Rainer in 1937. In June 2024, Hüller was invited to become a member of the Academy of Motion Picture Arts and Sciences. Besides Julia Jentsch and Paula Beer, Hüller is the only German actress to win both the European Film Award and the Silver Bear for Best Actress, top honours of the European Film Academy and Berlin Film Festival, in the 21st century.

Organizations	Year	Category	Work	Result	Ref.
Academy Awards	2023	Best Actress	Anatomy of a Fall	Nominated	
BAFTA Awards	2023	Best Actress	Anatomy of a Fall	Nominated	
BAFTA Awards	2023	Best Supporting Actress	The Zone of Interest	Nominated	
Berlin International Film Festival	2006	Silver Bear for Best Actress	Requiem	Won	
Berlin International Film Festival	2026	Silver Bear for Best Leading Performance	Rose	Won	
César Awards	2023	Best Actress	Anatomy of a Fall	Won	
Critics' Choice Movie Awards	2023	Best Actress	Anatomy of a Fall	Nominated	
Critics' Choice Super Award	2026	Best Actress in a Science Fiction/Fantasy Movie	Project Hail Mary	Nominated	
European Film Awards	2006	Best Actress	Requiem	Nominated	
European Film Awards	2016	Best Actress	Toni Erdmann	Won	
European Film Awards	2023	Best Actress	Anatomy of a Fall	Won	
European Film Awards	2023	Best Actress	The Zone of Interest	Nominated	
Golden Globe Awards	2023	Best Actress in a Motion Picture - Drama	Anatomy of a Fall	Nominated	

== See also ==
- List of Academy Award winners and nominees from Germany
- List of actors with Academy Award nominations
- List of actors nominated for Academy Awards for non-English performances
