= Franz Rogowski =

German actor & dancer (born 1986)

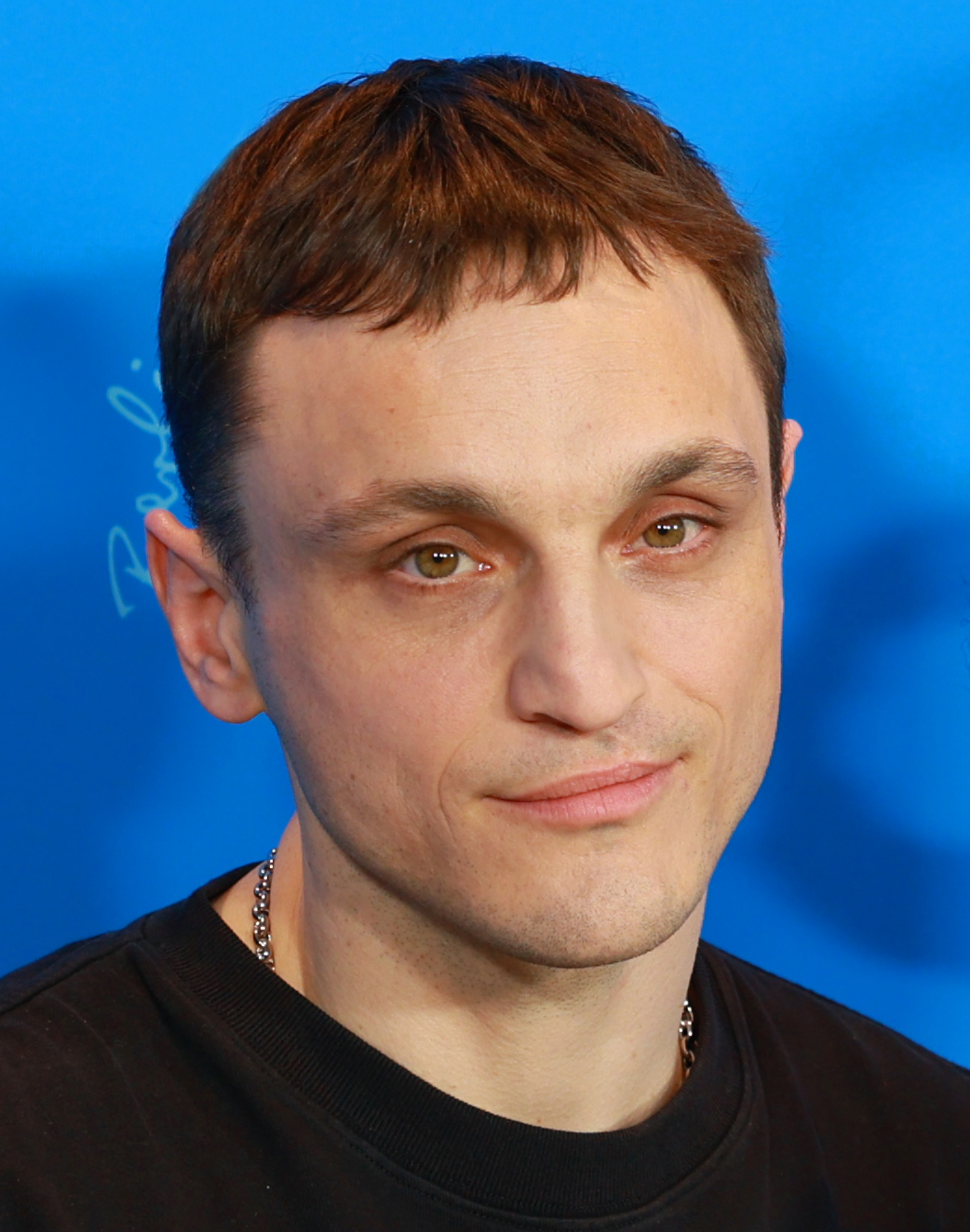
- Rogowski at Berlinale 2023
- Born: 2 February 1986 (age 40); Freiburg im Breisgau, West Germany
- Occupations: Film and stage actor; dancer
- Years active: 2011–present

Franz Rogowski (German: [ˈfʁants ʁoˈɡɔfski]; born 2 February 1986) is a German actor. He has appeared in films directed by Michael Haneke, Christian Petzold, Andrea Arnold, and Terrence Malick.

== Life and career ==
Franz Rogowski was born in 1986 in Freiburg im Breisgau, West Germany. The son of a pediatrician and a midwife, he grew up in a bourgeois environment in Tübingen. His maternal grandfather is former BDI President Michael Rogowski. Franz worked as a bike courier and bookstore assistant, attended a Swiss clown school, and trained in dance.

Since 2007, he has been active in the independent theater scene, appearing as a dancer, choreographer, and actor on various stages such as the Thalia Theater Hamburg, the Schauspielhaus Hannover, and the Schaubühne am Lehniner Platz.

Rogowski has a cleft lip that was surgically closed, resulting in a slight lisp. He was discovered as a film actor by Berlin director Jakob Lass, who cast him in Frontalwatte (2011) and the award-winning Love Steaks (2013).

The actor gained international attention with the film Victoria (2015), one of the few feature films shot in a single continuous take. The German thriller won the Silver Bear for Outstanding Artistic Contribution for Cinematography as well as six German Film Award categories. That same year, Rogowski became a permanent member of the Münchner Kammerspiele ensemble.

In 2017, he played the son of Isabelle Huppert's character in Michael Haneke's Happy End, which premiered at the Cannes Film Festival. He also starred in Transit by Christian Petzold and In den Gängen by Thomas Stuber, both of which were presented in the main competition at the Berlin International Film Festival. Rogowski was named a German "Shooting Star" in 2018 and won the German Film Award for Best Actor for In den Gängen. Rogowski gained further international recognition with Transit, which earned him a nomination for the Florida Film Critics Circle Award. Transit appeared on Barack Obama's list of favorite films of 2019.

In 2020, he collaborated again with Christian Petzold on Undine alongside Paula Beer. In 2021, Rogowski earned a European Film Award nomination for his performance in Great Freedom. The following year, he received a David di Donatello nomination for his role in the Italian film Freaks Out.

In 2023, his lead role in Lubo earned a spot in the competition at the Venice Film Festival. He also starred in Ira Sachs' drama Passages, winning the New York Film Critics Circle Award for Best Actor and earning an Independent Spirit Award nomination.

Films featuring Rogowski have been screened at the Berlin International Film Festival, Cannes Film Festival, and Venice Film Festival. He currently resides in Berlin.

== Filmography ==
=== Film ===
Year	Title	Role	Notes
2011	Frontalwatte	Franz	
2013	Love Steaks	Clemens Pollozek	
2015	Victoria	Boxer	
2015	We Are Fine Uns geht es gut	Tubbie	
2015	Wer nie sein Brot mit Tränen aß	—	Short film
2016	Simulant	—	Short film
2017	Tiger Girl	Malte	
2017	Happy End	Pierre Laurent	
2017	Bedbugs	Thorben / Thorsten / Son	
2017	Figaros Wolves	Gilbert	
2018	Lux: Warrior of Light	Lux / Thorsten Kachel	
2018	Transit	Georg	
2018	In the Aisles	Christian Gruvert	German Film Award for Best Actor in a Leading Role
2019	I Was at Home, But	Lars	
2019	A Hidden Life	Waldland	
2020	Black Milk	Franz	
2020	Undine	Christoph	
2021	Great Freedom	Hans Hoffmann	Nominated: Austrian Film Award for Best Actor; Nominated: Chlotrudis Award for Best Actor; Nominated: European Film Award for Best Actor; Nominated: German Film Actors Award for Best Actor in a Leading Role; Nominated: German Film Award for Best Actor in a Leading Role
2021	Heiko's World	Fränkie Fresh Finger	
2021	Luzifer	Johannes	
2021	Freaks Out	Franz	78th Venice Biennale Bisato d'Oro for Best Actor; Nominated: David di Donatello for Best Actor
2023	Passages	Tomas Freiburg	New York Film Critics Circle Award for Best Actor; Florida Film Critics Circle Award for Best Actor; Nominated: Gotham Award for Outstanding Lead Performance; Nominated: Independent Spirit Award for Best Lead Performance; Nominated: Satellite Award for Best Actor – Motion Picture, Drama
2023	Disco Boy	Alex	Nominated: Lumière Award for Best Actor
2023	Lubo	Lubo Moser	
2024	Bird	Bird	British Independent Film Award for Best Supporting Performance; Nominated: European Film Award for Best Actor
2027	Cliffhanger	TBA	Post-production
TBA	The Way of the Wind	TBA	Post-production
TBA	Wizards!	TBA	Post-production
TBA	Enemies	TBA	Post-production
TBA	The Masque of the Red Death	TBA	Post-production

=== Television ===
Year	Title	Role	Notes
2014	Polizeiruf 110	Aniel Radke	1 episode ("Hexenjagd")
2015	Besuch für Emma	Arne	TV Movie
2017	The Superhost	Joon 1	TV Movie

== Awards ==
- 2013: Förderpreis Neues Deutsches Kino (Advancement Award New German Cinema) for Love Steaks
- 2018: Shooting Stars Award at the Berlin Film Festival
- 2018: German Film Award: Best Actor in In the Aisles
- 2021: Austin Fantastic Fest: Best Actor in Luzifer
- 2021: Sitges Film Festival: Best Actor in Luzifer
- 2021: Hamptons International Film Festival: Special Jury Prize for Exceptional Performance in Great Freedom
- 2021: Seville European Film Festival: Best Actor in Great Freedom
- 2021: Torino Film Festival: Best Actor in Great Freedom
- 2022: German Screen Actors Award: Best Actor in Great Freedom
- 2023: New York Film Critics Circle Award for Best Actor in Passages
- 2023: Florida Film Critics Circle Award for Best Actor in Passages.
