= List of Dark characters =

The following is a list of fictional characters from Dark, a German science fiction thriller web television series, co-created by Baran bo Odar and Jantje Friese. The series stars a large ensemble cast led by Louis Hofmann in the role of Jonas Kahnwald.

== Overview ==
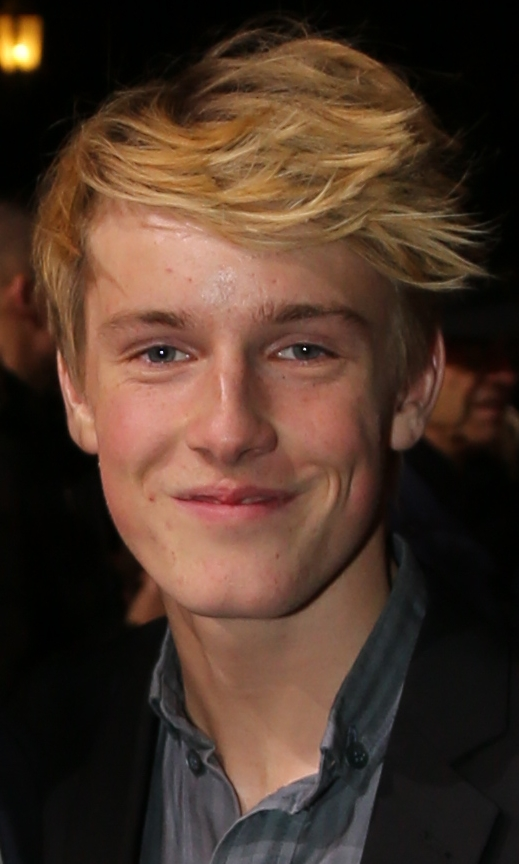
Louis Hofmann

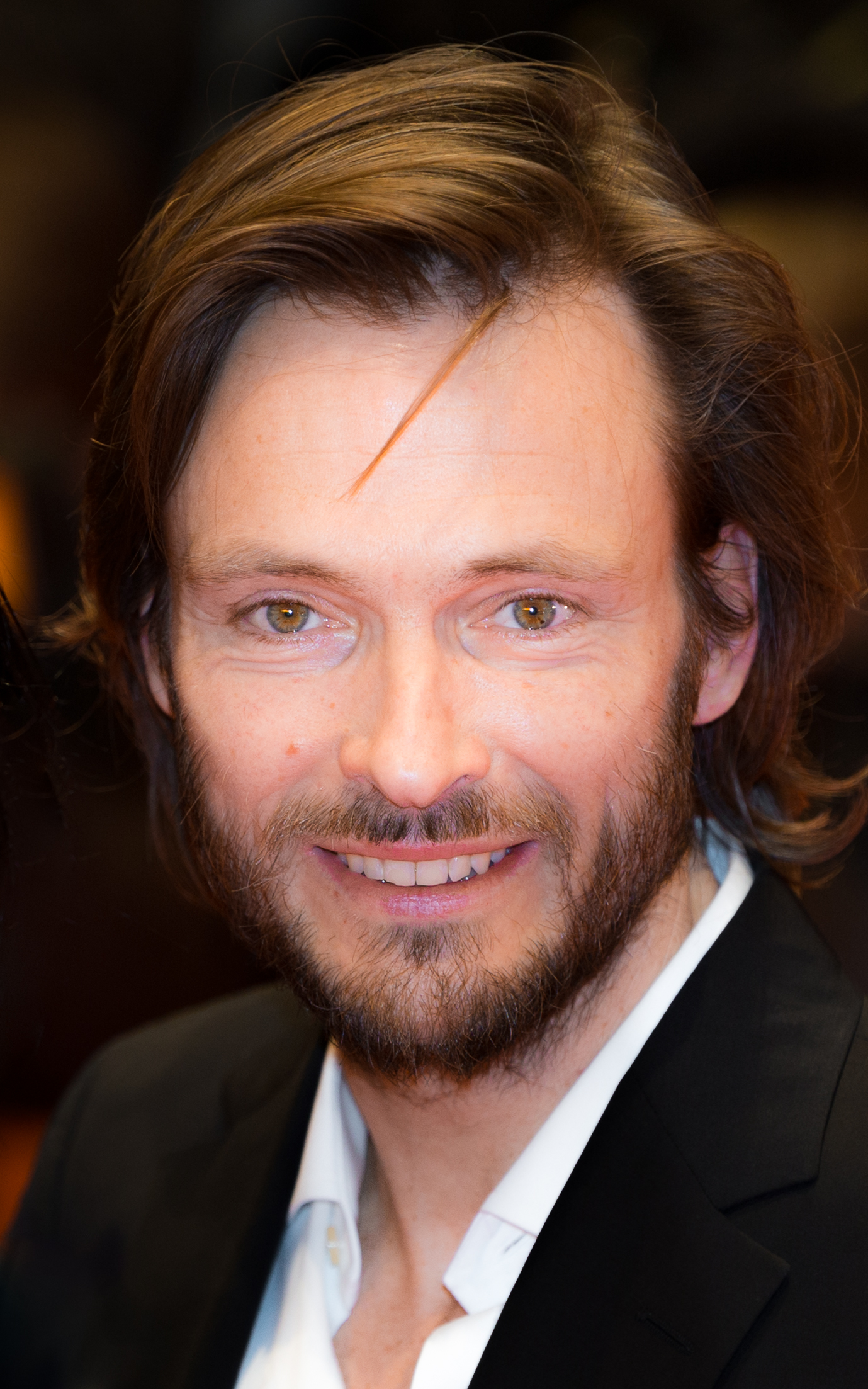
Andreas Pietschmann

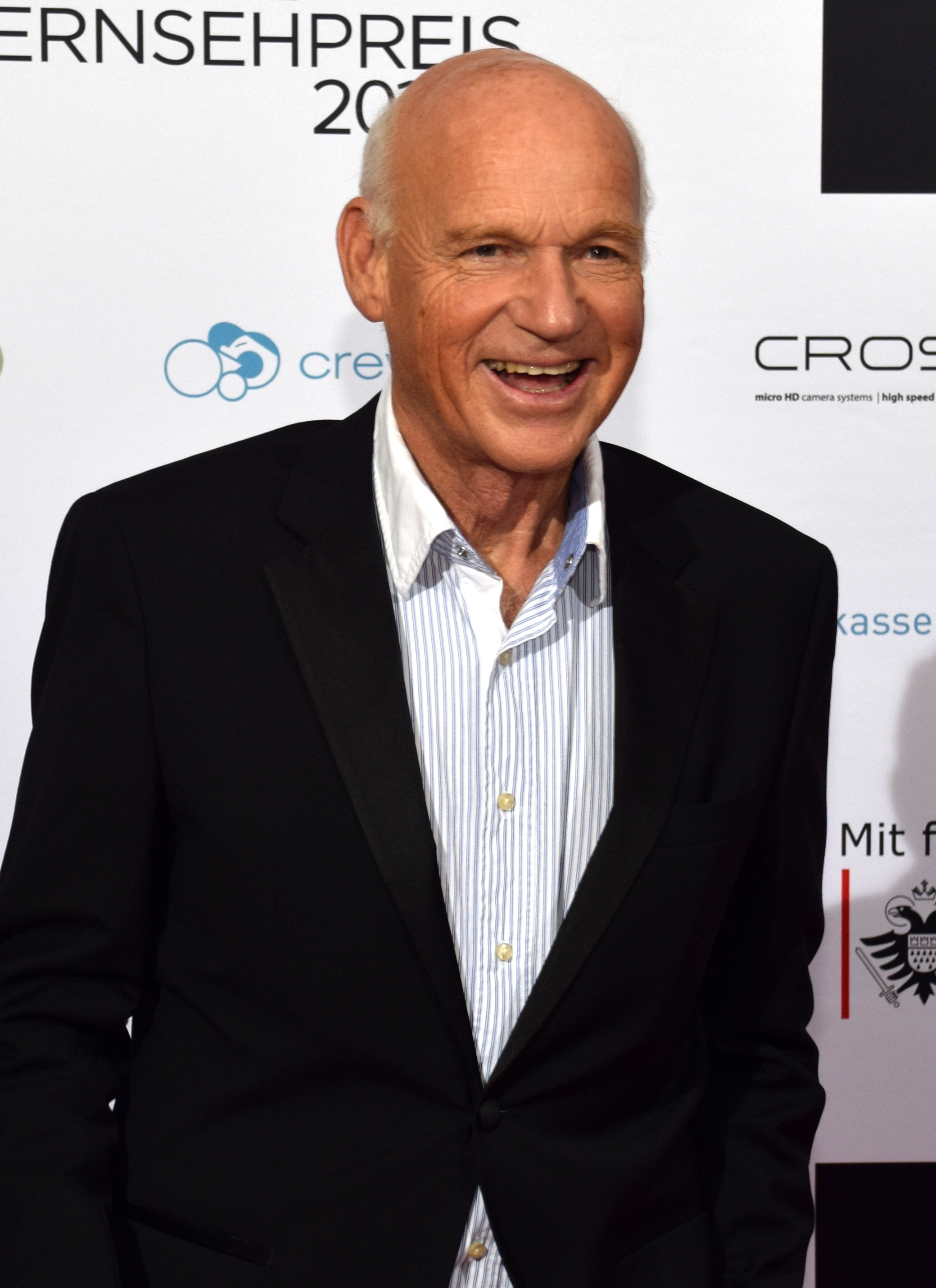
Dietrich Hollinderbäumer

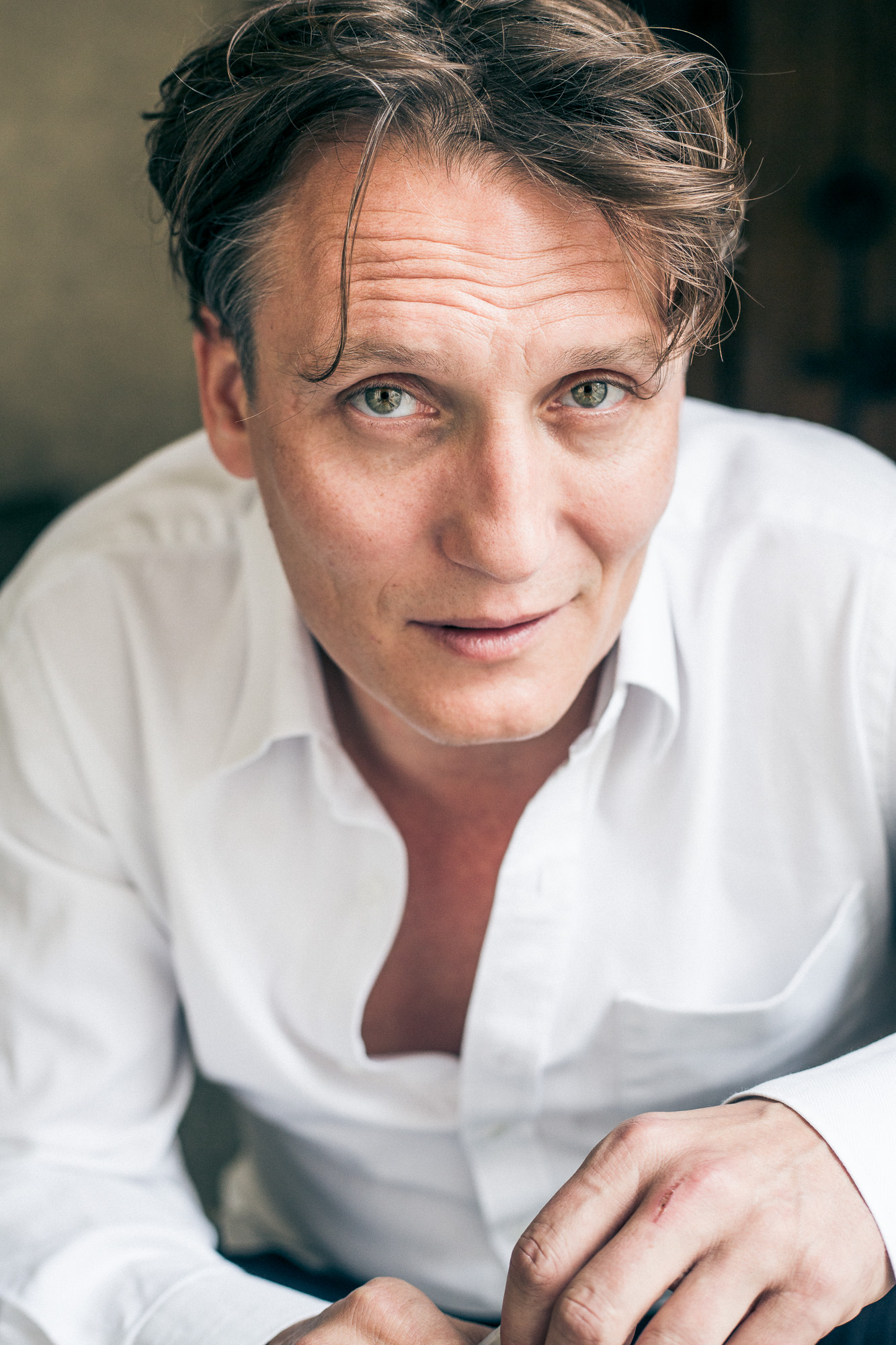
Oliver Masucci

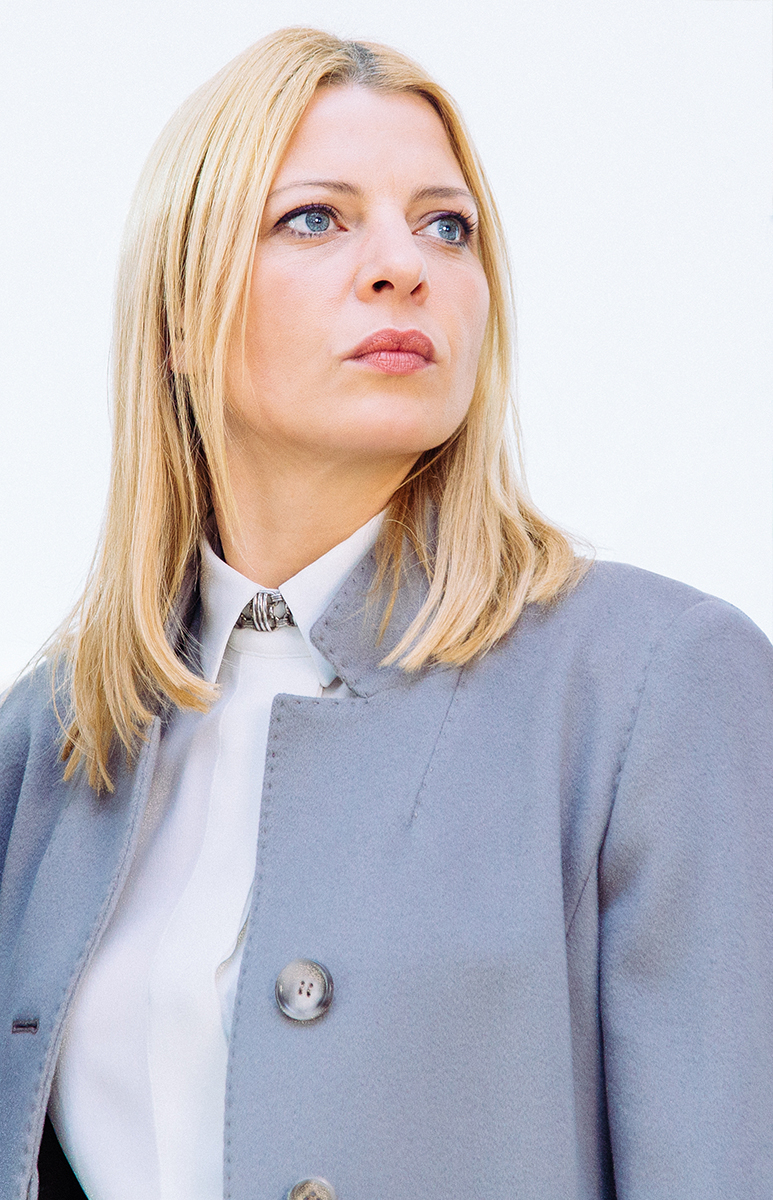
Jördis Triebel

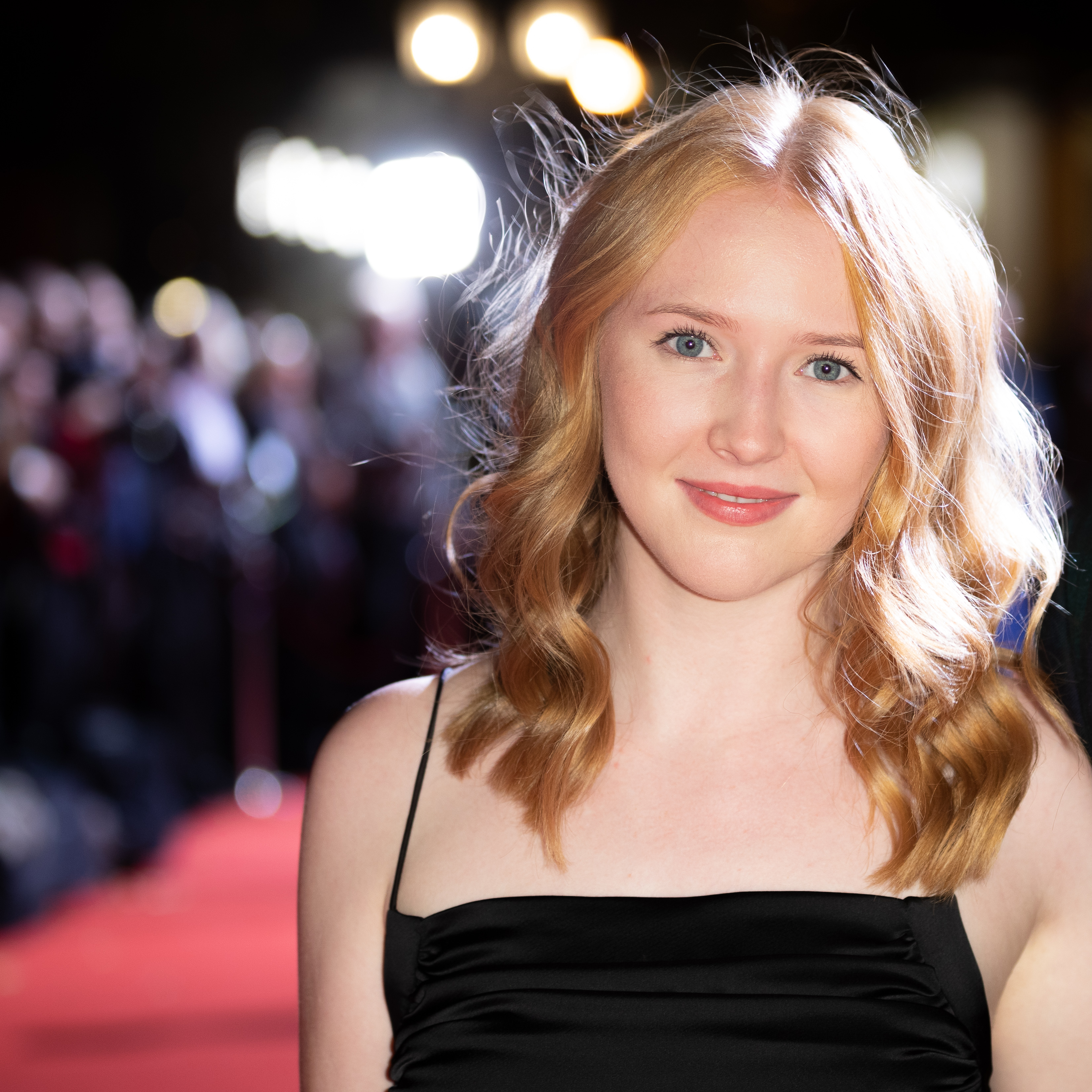
Gina Alice Stiebitz

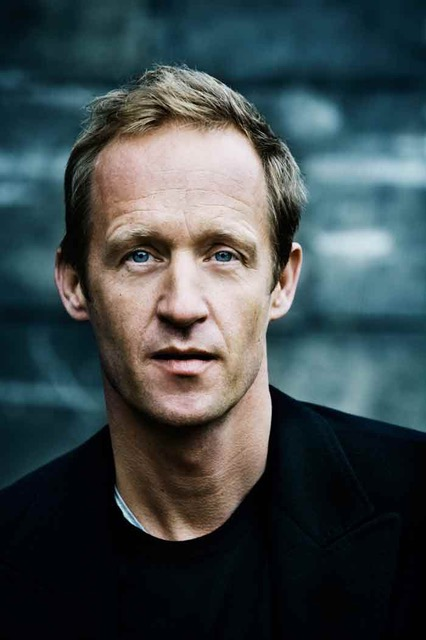
Stephan Kampwirth

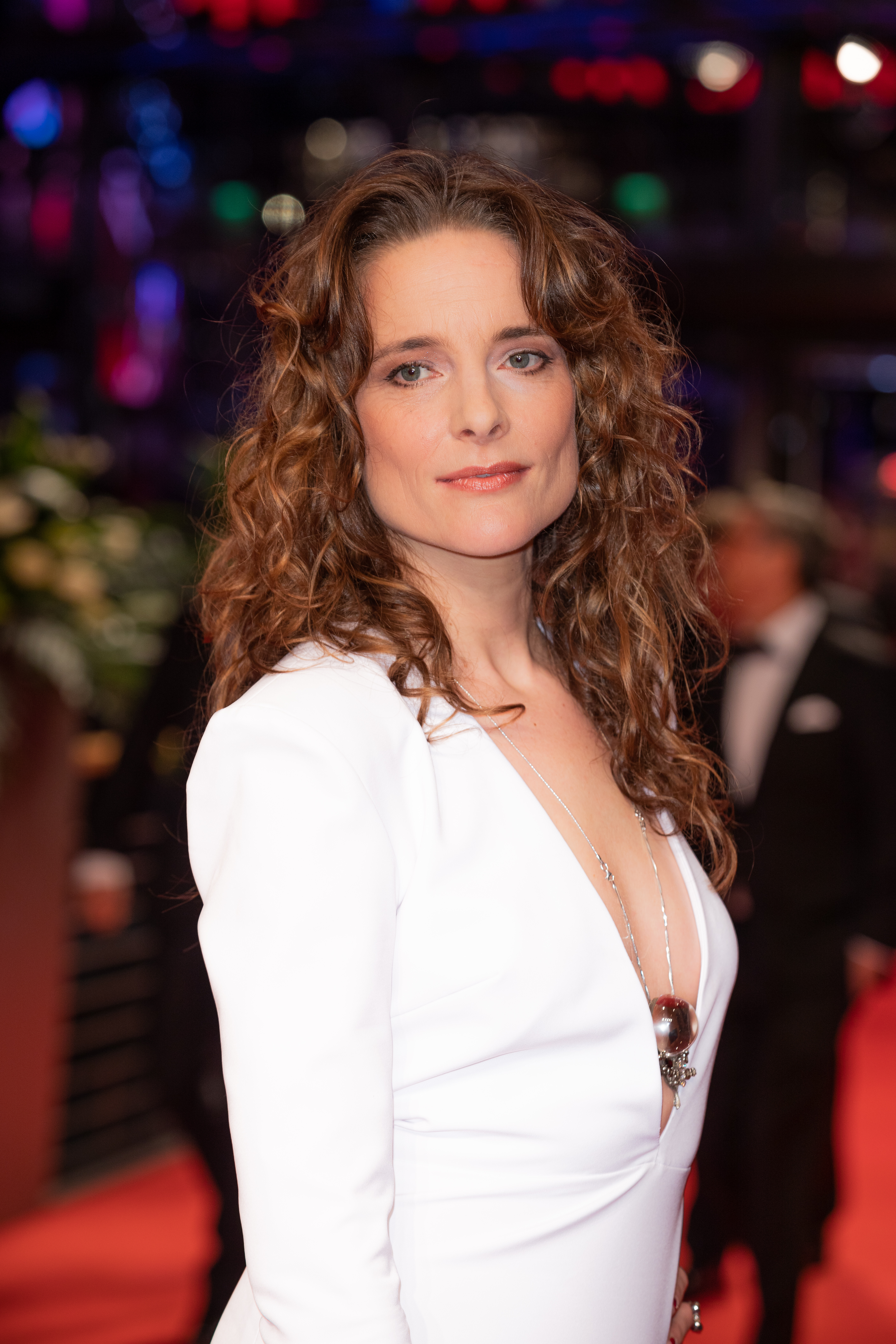
Anne Ratte-Polle

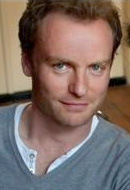
Mark Waschke

=== Cast Table ===
Character	Life stage	Actor	Season		
Character	Life stage	Actor	1	2	3
Jonas Kahnwald / The Stranger / Adam	Teen	Louis Hofmann	Main	Main	Main
Jonas Kahnwald / The Stranger / Adam	Adult	Andreas Pietschmann	Main	Main	Main
Jonas Kahnwald / The Stranger / Adam	Elder	Dietrich Hollinderbäumer		Main	Main
Mikkel Nielsen / Michael Kahnwald	Child	Daan Lennard Liebrenz (de)	Main	Main	Recurring
Ulrich Nielsen	Teen	Ludger Bökelmann	Main		Guest
Ulrich Nielsen	Adult	Oliver Masucci	Main	Main	Main
Katharina Nielsen	Teen	Nele Trebs (de)	Main	Guest	Recurring
Katharina Nielsen	Adult	Jördis Triebel	Main	Main	Main
Hannah Kahnwald	Teen	Ella Lee (de)	Main	Guest	Guest
Hannah Kahnwald	Adult	Maja Schöne	Main	Main	Main
Charlotte Doppler	Adult	Karoline Eichhorn	Main	Main	Main
Regina Tiedemann	Teen	Lydia Makrides	Main	Recurring	Guest
Regina Tiedemann	Adult	Deborah Kaufmann (de)	Main	Main	Recurring
Martha Nielsen / Female Stranger / Eva	Teen	Lisa Vicari	Main	Main	Main
Martha Nielsen / Female Stranger / Eva	Adult	Nina Kronjäger (de)			Main
Martha Nielsen / Female Stranger / Eva	Elder	Barbara Nüsse (de)			Main
Magnus Nielsen	Teen	Moritz Jahn	Main	Main	Main
Bartosz Tiedemann	Teen	Paul Lux (de)	Main	Main	Main
Franziska Doppler	Teen	Gina Alice Stiebitz	Main	Main	Main
Peter Doppler	Adult	Stephan Kampwirth	Main	Main	Main
Helge Doppler	Adult	Peter Schneider	Main	Recurring	Guest
Helge Doppler	Elder	Hermann Beyer (de)	Main		Recurring
Aleksander Tiedemann / Boris Niewald	Adult	Peter Benedict	Main	Main	Main
Jana Nielsen	Elder	Tatja Seibt (de)	Main	Guest	
Tronte Nielsen	Elder	Walter Kreye	Main	Guest	Recurring
Claudia Tiedemann	Adult	Julika Jenkins	Main	Main	Main
Claudia Tiedemann	Elder	Lisa Kreuzer	Recurring	Main	Recurring
Ines Kahnwald	Adult	Anne Ratte-Polle (de)	Main	Recurring	Guest
Ines Kahnwald	Elder	Angela Winkler	Main		
Elisabeth Doppler	Child	Carlotta von Falkenhayn (de)	Main	Main	Main
Egon Tiedemann	Elder	Christian Pätzold (de)	Main	Main	Recurring
H.G. Tannhaus	Elder	Christian Steyer (de)	Main	Guest	Recurring
Hanno Tauber / Noah	Adult	Mark Waschke	Main	Main	Main
The Unknown / The Origin	Child	Claude Heinrich			Main
The Unknown / The Origin	Adult	Jakob Diehl			Main
The Unknown / The Origin	Elder	Hans Diehl			Main

=== Main cast ===
==== Series 1 ====
- Louis Hofmann as Jonas Kahnwald
- Daan Lennard Liebrenz as Mikkel Nielsen
- Oliver Masucci as Ulrich Nielsen
- Jördis Triebel as Katharina Nielsen
- Maja Schöne as Hannah Kahnwald
- Karoline Eichhorn as Charlotte Doppler
- Deborah Kaufmann as Regina Tiedemann
- Lisa Vicari as Martha Nielsen
- Moritz Jahn as Magnus Nielsen
- Paul Lux as Bartosz Tiedemann
- Gina Alice Stiebitz as Franziska Doppler
- Stephan Kampwirth as Peter Doppler
- Hermann Beyer as Helge Doppler
- Ludger Bökelmann as Ulrich Nielsen (1986)
- Nele Trebs as Katharina Nielsen (1986)
- Ella Lee as Hannah Kahnwald (1986)
- Peter Benedict as Aleksander Tiedemann
- Tatja Seibt as Jana Nielsen
- Walter Kreye as Tronte Nielsen
- Julika Jenkins as Claudia Tiedemann (1986)
- Anne Ratte-Polle as Ines Kahnwald (1986)
- Lydia Makrides as Regina Tiedemann (1986)
- Peter Schneider as Helge Doppler (1986)
- Carlotta von Falkenhayn as Elisabeth Doppler
- Angela Winkler as Ines Kahnwald
- Christian Pätzold as Egon Tiedemann (1986)
- Andreas Pietschmann as The Stranger
- Christian Steyer as H.G. Tannhaus (1986)
- Mark Waschke as Noah

==== Series 2 ====
- Louis Hofmann as Jonas Kahnwald
- Maja Schöne as Hannah Kahnwald
- Jördis Triebel as Katharina Nielsen
- Karoline Eichhorn as Charlotte Doppler
- Deborah Kaufmann as Regina Tiedemann
- Lisa Vicari as Martha Nielsen
- Moritz Jahn as Magnus Nielsen
- Paul Lux as Bartosz Tiedemann
- Gina Alice Stiebitz as Franziska Doppler
- Carlotta von Falkenhayn as Elisabeth Doppler
- Julika Jenkins as Claudia Tiedemann (1987)
- Christian Pätzold as Egon Tiedemann (1987)
- Stephan Kampwirth as Peter Doppler
- Peter Benedict as Aleksander Tiedemann
- Oliver Masucci as Ulrich Nielsen
- Daan Lennard Liebrenz as Mikkel Nielsen
- Andreas Pietschmann as The Stranger
- Mark Waschke as Noah
- Dietrich Hollinderbäumer as Adam
- Lisa Kreuzer as Claudia Tiedemann

==== Series 3 ====
- Louis Hofmann as Jonas Kahnwald
- Lisa Vicari as Martha Nielsen
- Maja Schöne as Hannah Kahnwald
- Jördis Triebel as Katharina Nielsen
- Karoline Eichhorn as Charlotte Doppler
- Moritz Jahn as Magnus Nielsen
- Paul Lux as Bartosz Tiedemann
- Gina Alice Stiebitz as Franziska Doppler
- Julika Jenkins as Claudia Tiedemann
- Carlotta von Falkenhayn as Elisabeth Doppler
- Stephan Kampwirth as Peter Doppler
- Oliver Masucci as Ulrich Nielsen
- Peter Benedict as Aleksander Tiedemann
- Andreas Pietschmann as The Stranger
- Dietrich Hollinderbäumer as Adam
- Barbara Nüsse as Eva
- Nina Kronjäger as Female Stranger
- Mark Waschke as Noah
- Jakob Diehl as Adult Unknown
- Claude Heinrich as Child Unknown
- Hans Diehl as Elder Unknown

== Main characters ==
=== Kahnwald family ===
==== Jonas Kahnwald / The Stranger / Adam ====
Jonas Kahnwald (portrayed by Louis Hofmann) is the teenage son of Hannah and Michael Kahnwald. He has a crush on Martha Nielsen, but over the summer she starts dating Bartosz Tiedemann, Jonas' best friend.

The Stranger (portrayed by Andreas Pietschmann) is a hirsute adult time traveler working to undo many of the events that have taken place in Winden.

Adam (portrayed by Dietrich Hollinderbäumer) is the elderly, severely disfigured founder of Sic Mundus.

==== Mikkel Nielsen / Michael Kahnwald ====
Mikkel Nielsen (portrayed by Daan Lennard Liebrenz) is the youngest son of Ulrich and Katharina Nielsen. On November 4, 2019, at the age of 11, he travels back in time to 1986 where he is adopted by Ines Kahnwald and has his name changed to Michael Kahnwald. He later marries Hannah Krüger, with whom he fathers Jonas. On June 21, 2019, he commits suicide.

==== Hannah Kahnwald ====
Hannah Kahnwald (portrayed by Maja Schöne and Ella Lee) is the mother of Jonas Kahnwald and widow of Michael Kahnwald. In 1986, Hannah is shown to have an obsession with Ulrich Nielsen, even going as far as to accuse him of rape after discovering his relationship with Katharina. In 2019, Hannah is having an affair with Ulrich, one which comes to an abrupt end due to Mikkel's disappearance.

==== Ines Kahnwald ====
Ines Kahnwald (portrayed by Angela Winkler and Anne Ratte-Polle) is the adoptive mother of Michael Kahnwald and the adoptive grandmother of Jonas Kahnwald. In 1986, she works as a nurse at the Winden Hospital.

=== Nielsen family ===
==== Ulrich Nielsen ====
Ulrich Nielsen (portrayed by Oliver Masucci, Winfried Glatzeder and Ludger Bökelmann) is the husband of Katharina Nielsen, and the father of Martha, Magnus and Mikkel Nielsen. He is a police inspector in Winden. After Mikkel's disappearance, Ulrich suspects that Helge Doppler may have played a part in both the disappearance of his son and many other Winden children over the years, including his younger brother Mads. In an attempt to prevent this, Ulrich tries to travel back to 1986, but takes the wrong path and accidentally travels to 1953, meeting Helge as a 9-year old boy. Desperate to save his brother and his son, Ulrich tries to kill the child Helge with a rock, but is quickly arrested and imprisoned for the assault as well as allegedly murdering the two children whose corpses had just been discovered in the building site of the Winden Nuclear Power Plant.

==== Katharina Nielsen ====
Katharina Nielsen (portrayed by Jördis Triebel and Nele Trebs) is the wife of Ulrich Nielsen and the mother of Martha, Magnus and Mikkel Nielsen. In 2019, she is the principal at the local high school she used to attend.

==== Martha Nielsen / Female Stranger / Eva ====
Martha Nielsen (portrayed by Lisa Vicari) is the daughter of Ulrich and Katharina Nielsen and sister of Magnus and Mikkel. While Jonas is at a psychiatric facility due to his father's suicide, she starts dating his best friend Bartosz.

Female Stranger (portrayed by Nina Kronjäger) is the adult Martha who welcomes Jonas and young Martha to the future.

Eva (portrayed by Barbara Nüsse) is Adam's main opposition. She works tirelessly to ensure that the knot between the two worlds is never severed.

==== Magnus Nielsen ====
Magnus Nielsen (portrayed by Moritz Jahn) is the son of Ulrich and Katharina Nielsen. He is a rebellious stoner who is in a relationship with Franziska Doppler.

==== Jana Nielsen ====
Jana Nielsen (portrayed by Tatja Seibt) is the mother of Ulrich and Mads Nielsen and the wife of Tronte Nielsen. In 1986, Jana's son Mads goes missing, leaving Jana distraught; she still holds on to the belief that Mads may still be alive 33 years later.

==== Tronte Nielsen ====
Tronte Nielsen (portrayed by Walter Kreye) is the father of Ulrich and Mads Nielsen and the husband of Jana Nielsen. In 2020, he is visited by Claudia Tiedemann who takes him to Regina's grave in 2053, and tells him that he must kill Regina in order to keep everything in order. Tronte then, in 2020, smothers Regina with a pillow telling her that it is the only way to save her.

=== Doppler family ===
==== Charlotte Doppler ====
Charlotte Doppler (portrayed by Karoline Eichhorn) is the mother of Franziska and Elisabeth Doppler and the wife of Peter Doppler. She is also the chief of the Winden Police. Charlotte was born in 2041 and as a baby, she was kidnapped (by an older version of herself and Elisabeth) from her parents, Hanno and Elisabeth, and was taken back in time to 1971, where she was given to H.G. Tannhaus - who would go on to become Charlotte's legal guardian. Charlotte's daughter Elisabeth is also her biological mother.

==== Franziska Doppler ====
Franziska Doppler (portrayed by Gina Alice Stiebitz) is the oldest daughter of Charlotte and Peter Doppler. She is an opportunistic overachiever at school who is in a relationship with Magnus Nielsen.

==== Peter Doppler ====
Peter Doppler (portrayed by Stephan Kampwirth) is the husband of Charlotte Doppler, father of Elisabeth and Franziska Doppler and the son of Helge Doppler. A trained therapist, he consoles Jonas after his father commits suicide.

==== Helge Doppler ====
Helge Doppler (portrayed by Hermann Beyer and Peter Schneider) is the father of Peter Doppler. In 1953, at the age of 9, Helge is attacked by Ulrich Nielsen who tries to murder him after believing his older self to be responsible for the disappearance of Ulrich's son Mikkel. This attempted murder is unsuccessful, however, and Helge is just left with a scar on his face. After the attack, Helge awakes inside the bunker where he is transported through a wormhole to 1986. Here, Helge is taken under Noah's wing and manipulated into being his henchman, a role Helge would maintain over several decades. Over this time, Helge and Noah are responsible for the murder and disappearances of multiple children. In 2019, the elderly Helge is assumed to have gone senile, however he is still aware of his crimes and believes that he is able to travel back in time and change his acts. He attempts to do this by travelling back in time to 1986 and causing a car crash between himself and his middle-aged self, though this is unsuccessful as only the older version of Helge is killed in the crash.

==== Elisabeth Doppler ====
Elisabeth Doppler (portrayed by Carlotta von Falkenhayn) is the deaf daughter of Charlotte and Peter Doppler and the younger sister of Franziska Doppler. Following the apocalypse of 2020, Elisabeth marries Hanno Tauber, a.k.a. Noah, and unknowingly gives birth to her own mother, Charlotte, who is then abducted by an older version of herself and Charlotte, and taken back in time to 1971.

==== H.G. Tannhaus ====
H.G. Tannhaus (portrayed by Christian Steyer) is Charlotte's guardian, a clockmaker, lecturer in theoretical physics, and the author of the book A Journey Through Time. Tannhaus is responsible for the creation of both Adam's world and Eva's world in the Origin world, as after the death of his son, daughter-in-law and granddaughter, Tannhaus attempts to travel back in time to prevent their deaths, but in doing so, actually destroys the Origin world and creates Adam and Eva's.

=== Tiedemann family ===
==== Regina Tiedemann ====
Regina Tiedemann (portrayed by Deborah Kaufmann and Lydia Makrides) is the mother of Bartosz Tiedemann, wife of Aleksander Tiedemann and daughter of Claudia Tiedemann and Bernd Doppler. She is the owner of the Waldhotel Winden, struggling both with a lack of customers and a recent breast cancer diagnosis. Following the apocalypse of 2020, Regina is briefly cared for by her mother Claudia before being asphyxiated and murdered by Tronte Nielsen, at Claudia's orders, who tells Regina that it is the only way to save her.

==== Bartosz Tiedemann ====
Bartosz Tiedemann (portrayed by Paul Lux) is the son of Regina and Aleksander Tiedemann. He is Jonas' best friend and Martha's boyfriend. In 2019, Bartosz is visited by a priest who goes by the name of Noah and following many events that had transpired just as Noah had predicted, Bartosz agrees to do as he says. After travelling back to 1888, Bartosz fathers two children with a girl named Silja, Agnes and Hanno, the latter of which would grow up to become Noah.

==== Aleksander Tiedemann / Boris Niewald ====
Aleksander Tiedemann (portrayed by Peter Benedict) is the father of Bartosz Tiedemann and husband of Regina Tiedemann. He is the current director of the Winden Nuclear Power Plant. It is later revealed that his real name is Boris Niewald, and that he had assumed the identity of Aleksander Köhler, a victim of a bank robbery that he was involved in; after marrying Regina he adopted her surname in a further attempt to conceal his real identity. Hannah Kahnwald is aware of Aleksander's true identity and uses this to blackmail him into doing as she demands.

==== Claudia Tiedemann ====
Claudia Tiedemann (portrayed by Julika Jenkins and Lisa Kreuzer) is the daughter of Egon and Doris Tiedemann and the mother of Regina Tiedemann. In 1986, she became the first female director of the Winden Nuclear Power Plant. In 1987, she is visited by her future self and is made aware of the existence of time travel. Claudia goes on to become the main opposition to Adam and Sic Mundus, and earns the nickname 'The White Devil'.

==== Egon Tiedemann ====
Egon Tiedemann (portrayed by Christian Pätzold) is the father of Claudia and Silja Tiedemann, the (ex-)husband of Doris Tiedemann and a police chief investigator. In 1954, Egon has an affair with Hannah Kahnwald and impregnates her. Hannah initially intends on getting an abortion but backs out last minute; she travels to 1987 and in 1988 gives birth to Egon's daughter Silja. In 1987, during a physical altercation with Claudia, Egon falls backwards and hits his head on a table; Claudia tries to call an ambulance, but remembers a conversation she had with her older self in which she was told that she must make sacrifices so that Regina can live, and hangs up. Egon, therefore, bleeds to death.

==== Hanno Tauber / Noah ====
Hanno Tauber (portrayed by Mark Waschke) is a dedicated follower of Sic Mundus who, on Adam's instructions, poses as a priest in Winden and kidnaps young children to be used as guinea pigs in time travel experiments. He is, later, revealed to be the son of Bartosz and Silja Tiedemann. After the apocalypse, Noah marries Elisabeth Doppler and in 2041 she gives birth to their daughter, Charlotte. Shortly after this, Charlotte is kidnapped by an older version of herself as well as an older version of Elisabeth and taken back to 1971; Noah, however, believes that Claudia is to blame for the kidnapping of Charlotte. As Charlotte would go on to give birth to her own mother, Elisabeth, this means that Noah is married to his own granddaughter.

=== The Unknown ===
==== The Unknown ====
The Unknown (portrayed by Jakob Diehl, Claude Heinrich and Hans Diehl) is the son of Jonas Kahnwald and Martha Nielsen from Eva's world. He always appears alongside his older and younger self, all of whom are easily distinguished by their cleft lip.

== Recurring characters ==
=== Introduced in Series 1 ===
- Cordelia Wege as Greta Doppler, Bernd's wife and Helge's abusive mother
- Anatole Taubman and Michael Mendl as Bernd Doppler, Greta's husband, Helge's father and the founder of the Winden Nuclear Power Plant
- Antje Traue as Agnes Nielsen, The Unknown's ex-wife; Tronte's mother
- Luise Heyer as Doris Tiedemann, Claudia's mother and Egon's wife
- Florian Panzner as Daniel Kahnwald, Ines' father and the Winden chief of police in 1953
- Lea van Acken as Silja Tiedemann, Elisabeth's interpreter and the daughter of Hannah Kahnwald and Egon Tiedemann
- Leopold Hornung as Torben Wöller, a police officer in 2019 and 2020 with a bandage on his eye, Benni/Bernadette's brother
- Anton Rubtsov as Benni/Bernadette, a transgender prostitute and Torben's sister
- Lea Willkowsky as Jasmin Trewen, Claudia Tiedemann's secretary in 1986 and 1987
- Tom Jahn as Jürgen Obendorf, Erik Obendorf's father, the owner of a junkyard who used to deal drugs with his son before he disappeared
- Hermann Albers, Katharina's father and a sheep farmer

=== Introduced in Series 2 ===
- Sylvester Groth as Wilhelm Clausen, a police inspector called to Winden to investigate the missing people of 2019
- Katharina Spiering as Helene Albers, Katharina's abusive mother and a psychiatric nurse
