= Dietrich Hollinderbäumer =

German-Swedish actor (born 1942)

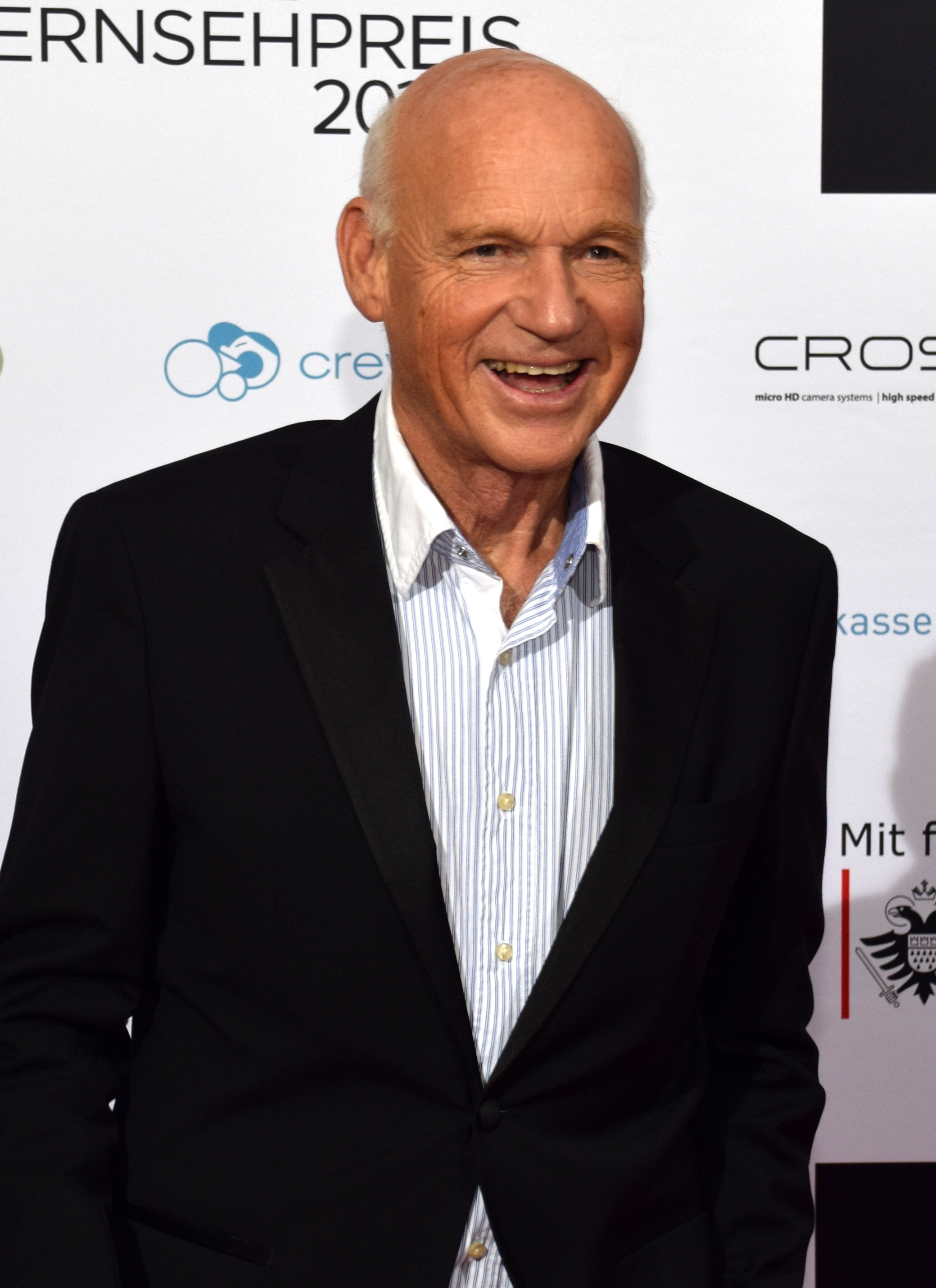
- Hollinderbäumer in 2015
- Born: 16 August 1942 (age 83); Essen, Nazi Germany
- Occupation: Actor
- Years active: 1972–present

Dietrich Hollinderbäumer (born 16 August 1942) is a German-Swedish actor. He is known for his role in Downfall as Robert Ritter von Greim and for playing Adam in the German Netflix series Dark.

== Early life ==
Hollinderbäumer was born to a Swedish mother and a German father. His mother immigrated to Germany and met her husband there. When Dietrich was 9 in 1951, his parents separated and he and his then two-year-old brother moved to Stockholm. Hollinderbäumer studied at Royal Dramatic Theatre in Stockholm. From 1968 to 1972 he worked for Westfälisches Landestheater. From 1978 to 1983 he worked at Theater & Orchester Heidelberg. From 1983 to 1988 he worked at Burgtheater in Wien. He worked as actor in German films and television programs.

== Personal life ==
Hollinderbäumer has two children, who are also actors. He speaks German and Swedish at a native level and is fluent in English.

== Filmography ==
- 1974: Graf Yoster gibt sich die Ehre: Der Papageienkäfig (TV series episode)
- 1989: Seven Minutes .... Seifert
- 1991: Die Männer vom K3 (TV Series, one episode) .... Wolfgang Lützow
- 1991: Eine erste Liebe
- 1991–2004: Ein Fall für Zwei (TV Series, twelve episodes) .... Prosecutor Sieber / Hartmann / Prosecutor Moebius / Kommissar Bigeler / Kommissar Schmiedek / Untersuchungsrichter / Tenberg / Prosecutor
- 1994: Wolffs Revier (TV Series, one episode) .... Walter Gersberg
- 1994: Die Kommissarin (TV Series, one episode) .... Haase
- 1997: Dr. Stefan Frank – Der Arzt, dem die Frauen vertrauen (TV Series, one episode)
- 1998: Tatort – Russisches Roulette (TV Series)
- 1998: Kommissar Rex (TV Series, one episode) .... Stefan Klein
- 1998: Ultimate Trespass (TV Movie) .... Wagner
- 1998: Tatort – Gefallene Engel (TV Series) .... Dekan
- 1999: SOKO 5113 (TV Series, one episode)
- 1999: Der Fahnder (TV Series, one episode) .... Baumann
- 1999: Long Hello and Short Goodbye .... Kahnitz
- 1999: Medicopter 117 (TV Series, one episode) .... Dr. Bach
- 2000: Das Phantom (TV Movie) .... Baré
- 2000: Tatort – Die kleine Zeugin (TV Series) .... Robert
- 2000: Når mørket er forbi .... Krebs
- 2001: Nur mein Sohn war Zeuge (TV Movie) .... Bodenburg
- 2001: Im Namen des Gesetzes (TV Series, one episode) .... Prof. Dr. Eberhard Brunner
- 2001: Tatort – Exil! (TV Series) .... Dr. Kevin Lohmann
- 2001: Tatort – Hasard! (TV Series) .... Dr. Kevin Lohmann
- 2001: Erkan & Stefan gegen die Mächte der Finsternis .... Prof. Johns
- 2002: Therapie und Praxis (TV Movie) .... Reinhard Arnsberg
- 2002: Shattered Glass .... Gebhard
- 2002: The Hunt for the Hidden Relic (TV Movie) .... John Kaun
- 2004: Alarm für Cobra 11 – Die Autobahnpolizei (TV Series, one episode) .... Roberto Leone
- 2004: Der Traum vom Süden (TV Movie) .... Erich
- 2004: Die Stunde der Offiziere (TV Movie) .... Generalfeldmarschall Erich von Manstein
- 2004: Einmal Bulle, immer Bulle (TV Series, six episodes) .... Bernd Reiff
- 2004: Der Untergang .... Generalfeldmarschall Robert Ritter von Greim
- 2004: Tatort – Abgezockt (TV Series) .... Max Hüllen
- 2004: Saint Rita (TV Movie) .... Ferdinando Mancini
- 2004–2009: In aller Freundschaft (TV Series, two episodes) .... Armin Wittgenstein / Johannes Paintner
- 2005–2018: Pastewka (TV Series) .... Volker Pastewka
- 2006: Die Rosenheim-Cops (TV Series, one episode) .... Walter Ammon
- 2006: Lulu (TV Movie) .... Dr. Goll
- 2006: Cologne P.D. (one episode) .... Hermann Lahnstein
- 2006: SOKO Kitzbühel (TV Series, one episode) .... Ralf Renner
- 2006: Zwei am großen See (TV Series, one episode) .... Dr. Eberhard Perny
- 2006: Vier Minuten .... Pater Vincens
- 2006: Joy Division .... Grandpa
- 2006: Ein starkes Team – Zahn um Zahn (TV Series) .... Henry von Haase
- 2007–2017: Der Kommissar und das Meer (TV Series) .... Jan Hagman
- 2007: Wilsberg – Unter Anklage (TV Series)
- 2007: Afrika, mon amour (TV Mini-Series)
- 2008: Bella Block – Reise nach China (TV Series) .... Dr. Scherwitz
- 2008: Ein Ferienhaus in Marrakesch (TV Movie) .... Norman Hopkins
- 2008: Putzfrau Undercover (TV Movie) .... Eckhard Windhorst
- 2008: The Visit (TV Movie) .... Matthias Büsing
- 2008: The Swimsuit Issue .... Volker
- 2009–2018: heute-show (TV Series) .... Ulrich von Heesen / Teufel
- 2009: Diamantenhochzeit .... Vater Dähnert
- 2009: Augustinus (TV Movie) .... Macrobius
- 2010: Countdown – Die Jagd beginnt (TV Series, one episode) .... Hans-Jörg Bennat
- 2010: Kreuzfahrt ins Glück (TV Series) .... Peter May
- 2011: The Cold Sky (TV Movie) .... Psychiatrist
- 2011: Der letzte Bulle (TV Series, Mord auf Seite 1) .... Berthold von Baranki
- 2011: Försvunnen .... Peter
- 2011: Men Are Wired One Way, Women Another (TV Movie) .... Felix Brugger
- 2011: Die Brücke – Transit in den Tod (TV Series) .... Göran
- 2011: Allein gegen die Zeit (TV Series) .... Dr. Crohn
- 2011–2015: Reiff für die Insel .... Helge Quedens
- 2012: Komm, schöner Tod (TV Movie) .... Sebastian von Werding
- 2012: Letzte Spur Berlin (TV Series, one episode) .... Rüdiger Herzog
- 2012: Drei Stunden .... Gott
- 2012: Alles bestens (TV Movie) .... Paul Rademacher
- 2012–2014: Add a Friend (TV Series) .... Gerd
- 2013: Küstenwache (TV Series, one episode) .... Dr. Werner Vosskamp
- 2013: Utta Danella – Sturm am Ehehimmel (TV Series) .... Paul Sommer
- 2014: Weiter als der Ozean (TV Movie)
- 2014: Real Buddy .... Nathan Hopkins
- 2015: Ein Sommer in Masuren (TV Movie) .... Jakub Wozniak
- 2015: SOKO 5113 (TV Series, one episode) .... Willibald Janker
- 2016: Hubert und Staller (Unter Wölfen) (TV Movie) .... Manfred Kröpf
- 2017: Der Kommissar und das Meer – In einem kalten Land (TV Series) .... Jan Hagman
- 2017: Rentnercops (TV Series, one episode)
- 2017: Das Pubertier (TV Series) .... Eberhard Maybacher
- 2017: Angst – Der Feind in meinem Haus (TV Movie) .... Hermann Tiefenthaler
- 2017: Schatz, nimm Du sie! .... Chefarzt
- 2019: Dark (TV Series, season 2, season 3) .... Adam / Jonas Kahnwald

== Awards ==
- 2009, 2010, 2011, 2012: Deutscher Comedypreis as member of television program heute-show on broadcaster ZDF
- 2010: Jury-Preis "Bester Kurzfilm über 15 Minuten" by Palm Springs International Short Film Festival for Hermann
- 2010: Adolf-Grimme-Preis as member of heute-show (ZDF)
- 2011: Deutscher Fernsehpreis as member of heute-show (ZDF)
- 2013: Deutscher Comedypreis as Best actor for Pastewka (Nominination)
- 2013: Adolf-Grimme-Preis for Add a friend
