= Carla Juri =

Swiss actress (born 1985)

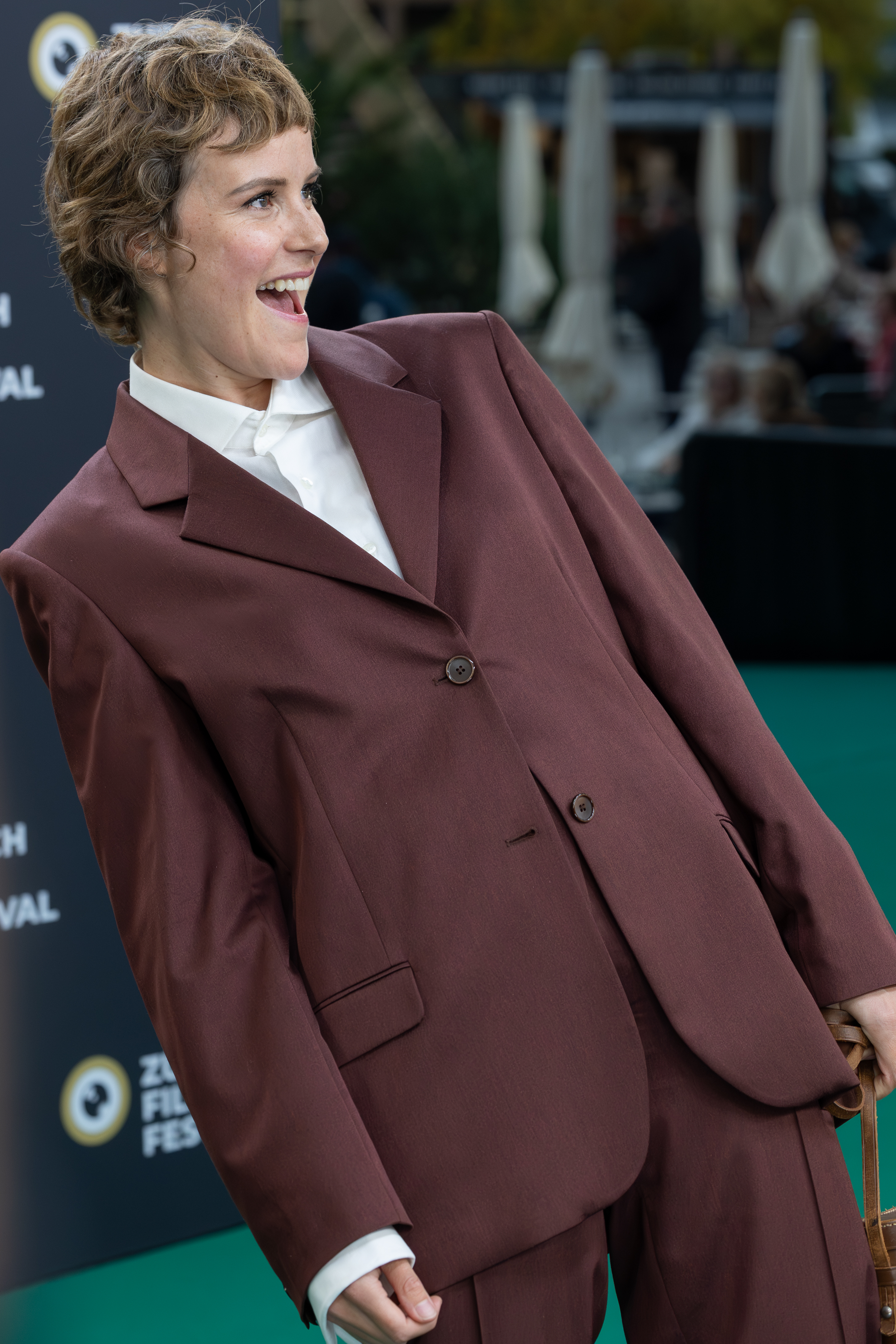
- Juri in 2025
- Born: 2 January 1985 (age 41); Locarno, Ticino, Switzerland
- Occupation: Actress
- Years active: 2006–present

Carla Juri (Italian pronunciation: [ˈkarla ˈjuːri]; born 2 January 1985) is a Swiss actress. Her acting credits include 180°, Wetlands, Finsterworld and Blade Runner 2049.

== Early life and education ==
Juri was raised in Ambrì, a village in the Italian-speaking Canton of Ticino in Switzerland. Her father is a lawyer, and her mother is a sculptor. Fluent in German, Italian and English, she learned the first two when she was young, and English at 15. In school, she played ice hockey for HC Ambrì-Piotta and went on to be a forward for the Swiss Schweizer Meister Class A team, SC Reinach. From 2005 until 2010, she studied theatre in Los Angeles and London.

Juri started her acting career by hopping between auditions in Berlin, London and Rome. She maintained a busy schedule trying to find work while making use of her trilingualism.

From 2005 to 2007, Juri was coached by Douglas Matranga in Los Angeles. Between 2007 and 2008, she took part in the ensemble of the Theatrical Arts Theatre Company in Los Angeles. From 2008 to 2010, Juri attended acting classes at The Actors Centre in London.

== Career ==
Juri's first film appearance was in the short film Midday Room. In 2011, she received the Swiss Film Award in the Best Performance in a Supporting Role category for 180° (2010) and won the award for Best Actress for her role in Someone Like Me the next year. In 2013, she was selected to receive the Shooting Star which is awarded annually to ten young European actors at the Berlin International Film Festival. She also played the leading role in the 2013 film adaptation of Wetlands, which is arguably the role she is best known for. The novel it is based on was a controversial bestseller in Germany. To prepare for this role, Juri wore the clothes of her character, Helen, for several weeks and spent a lot of this time in Berlin, where her character lives. She even went undercover as a student at a high school where only the principal knew she was an actress. She appeared in the Blade Runner sequel, Blade Runner 2049, as a designer of implanted memories for replicants.

== Selected filmography ==
=== Film ===
Year	Title	Role	Notes
2006	Midday Room	The Bride	Short film
2008	The Space You Leave	Lea	Short film
2010	180° – Wenn deine Welt plötzlich Kopf steht	Esther Grüter	
2010	Bold Heroes	Michis Cousine	
2012	Jump	Jane	
2012	Someone Like Me	Annemarie Geiser	aka Eine wen iig, dr Dällebach Kari
2012	Questo è mio	Maestra	Short film
2013	Finsterworld	Natalie	
2013	Wetlands	Helen Memel	
2013	Lovely Louise	Young Louise	
2014	Fossil	Julie	
2014	Spooky & Linda	Linda	Short film
2016	Morris from America	Inka	
2016	Paula	Paula Modersohn-Becker	
2016	Brimstone	Elizabeth Brundy	
2017	Blade Runner 2049	Ana Stelline	
2019	Intrigo: Dear Agnes	Agnes	
2019	When Hitler Stole Pink Rabbit	Dorothea	
2020	Six Minutes To Midnight	Ilse Keller	
2020	Amulet	Magda	
2023	Walking to Paris	Lucy	
2024	Torch Song	Liz Alexander	
2024	Breathing Underwater	Emma	
2025	Donkey Days	Ines	It premiered in main competition at the Locarno on 10 August.

=== Television ===
Year	Title	Role	Notes
2010	Married to a Cop	Ilaria Cantilli	Episode: "Una figlia"
2011	Un passo dal cielo	Nina	Episode: "Salvato dalle acque"
2012	Der Kriminalist	Marie	Episode: "Des Königs Schwert"

=== Music video ===
- Your Love Is Killing Me (2014) by Sharon Van Etten

== Awards ==
- 2011: Best Supporting Actress for 180° at the Swiss Film Awards
- 2012: Best Leading Actress at the Swiss Film Awards
- 2013: Shooting Stars Award - Europe's Best Young Actors
