= Susanne Wolff =

German actress

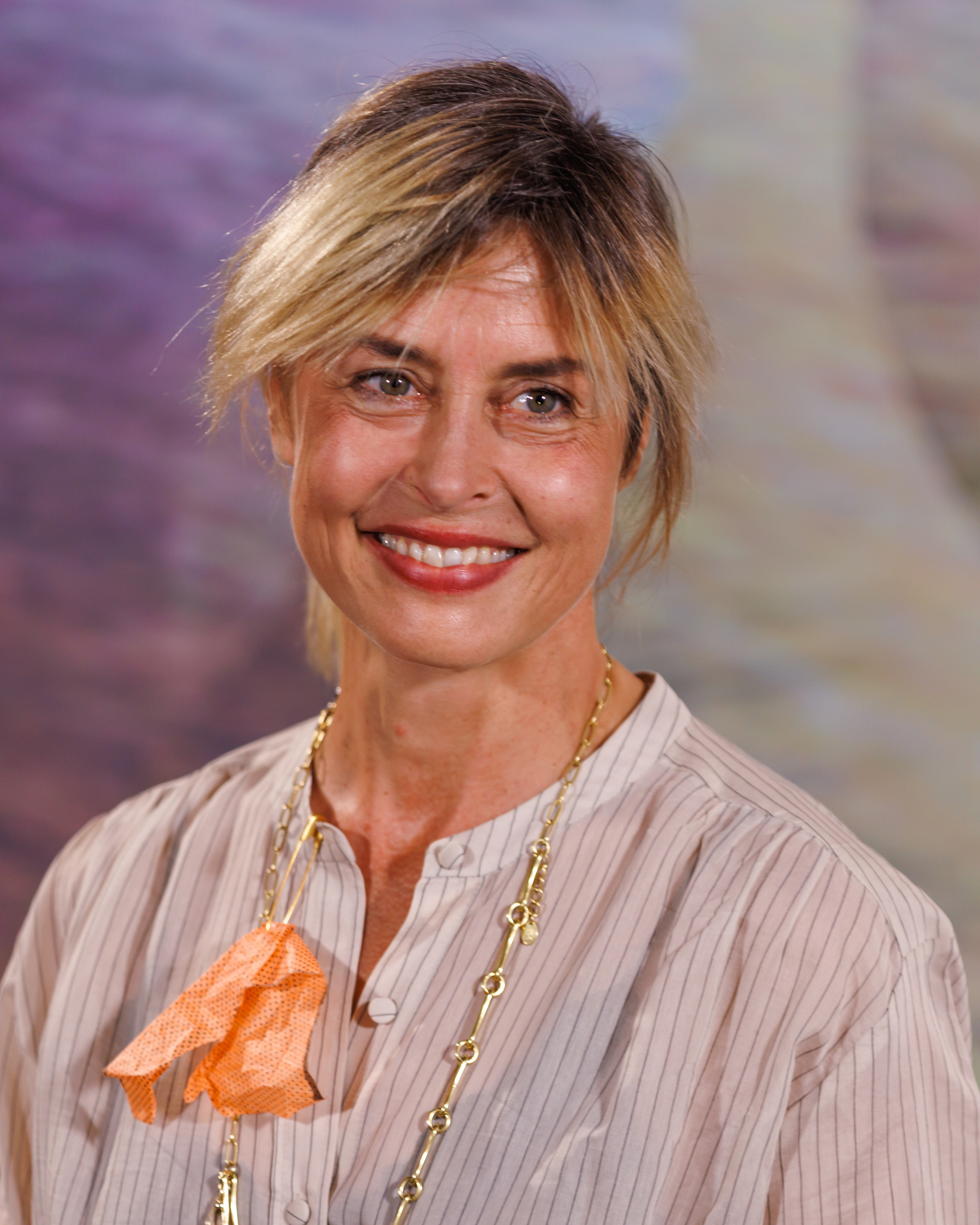
Wolff in 2025

Susanne Wolff is a German actress. She is known for her lead roles in the 2018 film Styx; as Empress Elisabeth of Austria in the 2023 film Sisi & I; and as a former BND spy in the 2026 Gaumont / Netflix spy drama series Unfamiliar.

== Early life and education ==
Susanne Wolff was born in Bielefeld.

She studied at the Hochschule für Musik, Theater und Medien Hannover.

== Partial filmography ==
- 2006 : Vineta
- 2007 : Bis zum Ellenbogen
- 2008 : The Stranger in Me''
- 2011 : The Three Musketeers
- 2012 : Mobbing (TV film)
- 2014 : Über-Ich und Du
- 2016 : Hedda
- 2016: Morgen hör ich auf
- 2017 : Return to Montauk
- 2018: Styx
- 2018: Nichts zu verlieren
- 2023: Sisi & I as Empress Elisabeth of Austria
- 2025: Köln 75
- 2025: Donkey Days, Premiered in main competition at the 78th Locarno Film Festival on 10 August.
- 2026: Unfamiliar
