= Walking to Paris =

Unreleased film by Peter Greenaway

- Directed by: Peter Greenaway
- Written by: Peter Greenaway
- Produced by: Andrea De Liberato; Kees Kasander; Emanuele Moretti
- Starring: Emun Elliott; Paolo Bernardini; Andrea Scarduzio; Jacopo Uccella; Carla Juri; Manuela Biedermann
- Cinematography: Paolo Carnera; Fabio Paolucci; Reinier van Brummelen
- Edited by: Elmer Leupen
- Music by: Marco Robino
- Production company: Motus Studios
- Release date: 12 November 2023 (IDFA); (work-in-progress)
- Countries: Italy; France; Switzerland
- Language: English

Walking to Paris is an unreleased biographical drama film directed and written by Peter Greenaway. It is devoted to an 18-month journey through Europe, by Constantin Brâncuși, at the beginning of the 20th century. The film is not a documentary, nor is it a biographical film, but rather a fiction imagined by the British director from a real fact about which hardly any details are known.

== Synopsis ==
The film is devoted to the journey of a young 26/27-year-old artist destined to become famous, Constantin Brâncuși, traveling through Europe. He leaves Romania, where he was born and began studying fine arts, to Paris, where he wishes to deepen his training. This journey is a historical fact, covering over 2,500 kilometers on foot across Europe at the beginning of the 20th century and lasting 18 months. However, the details of this adventure remain unknown. Peter Greenaway has crafted a cinematic fiction from this trip, imagining comic or violent adventures, sometimes sexual and sometimes romantic. The reconstituted peregrination is also marked by the construction of sculptures using materials found along the way.

== Cast ==
- Emun Elliott as Constantin Brâncuși
- Paolo Bernardini as Constantin Brâncuși
- Andrea Scarduzio as Constantin Brâncuși
- Jacopo Uccella as Constantin Brâncuși
- Carla Juri as Lucy
- Remo Girone as son of Brâncuși
- Marcello Mazzarella as Auguste Rodin
- Anthony Souter as Jonathan Art Historian
- Manuela Biedermann as Vittoria

== Production ==
=== Filming ===
The winter sequences were shot in Italy and Switzerland in late 2015. Further production, to capture the summer sequences, was reportedly planned for mid 2016, though Greenaway stated in early 2017 that the scenes had yet to be shot. In December 2022, Greenaway stated that his creative involvement with the film had been completed approximately two years earlier, but it is unclear when exactly the remaining period of principal photography took place.

=== Post-production ===
In December 2022, Greenaway stated that post-production on the film had still not been completed; that it was "languishing in a laboratory in Rome", and that he had moved on from the project, saying:

It got chewed up and regorged and reconsidered by a whole group of producers who are still arguing about finishing it. We still have to dub it, we still have to create it, etc. As far as my creativity on the film is concerned, it's completely finished now and has been for about two years, but it's very difficult to wrestle this wretched phenomenon out of the hands of warring producers. There is some talk about it maybe being ready for the Berlin Film Festival [in February 2023], but we're onto other things because I can't hang about waiting for these producers to make their minds up.

=== Music ===
The original soundtrack is by Marco Robino, Marco Gentile, and the Turin Architorti string quintet, picking up a collaboration already provided with the director (Rembrandt's J'accuse, Goltzius and the Pelican Company).

== Release ==
The first trailer for the film was released on 3 March 2022, alongside an announcement of a November 2022 release date, which did not come to pass. A work-in-progress cut was screened at the International Documentary Film Festival Amsterdam on 12 November 2023, presented as "a special treat" during a talk given by Peter Greenaway, but distribution remained uncertain due to unresolved rights issues.
