= Womb (2010 film) =

- Release poster
- Directed by: Benedek Fliegauf
- Written by: Benedek Fliegauf; Elizabeth Szasz
- Produced by: Gerhard Meixner; András Muhi; Roman Paul
- Starring: Eva Green; Matt Smith
- Cinematography: Peter Szatmari
- Edited by: Xavier Box
- Music by: Max Richter
- Distributed by: Olive Films
- Release date: 15 July 2010 (German Film Week)
- Running time: 107 minutes
- Countries: Germany; Hungary; France
- Language: English
- Budget: €3.66 million

Womb (retitled Clone for its UK DVD release) is a 2010 science fiction drama film written and directed by Benedek Fliegauf, and starring Eva Green and Matt Smith.

== Plot ==
The film begins on a beach during a foggy day. A woman (Eva Green) is thinking while she is having tea on the porch of her house. She is in an advanced state of pregnancy. She knows that the father of her child will not return, but she thinks that perhaps her unborn child was the only thing she needed from him. She smiles sinisterly and begins to reminisce about the events leading up to that moment.

A love story is then told between two children, Rebecca and Tommy, who swear each other eternal love. When Rebecca departs suddenly for Japan with her mother, the two are separated. Twelve years later, Rebecca returns as a young woman to find that Tommy (Matt Smith) not only remembers her, but still cares deeply for her. The two begin a new relationship.

Tommy is a political activist fighting against the biotech corporations, who plan to open a new natural park populated by animals artificially created by cloning. Tommy plans to spoil the inauguration ceremony by letting loose rucksacks filled with cockroaches. Rebecca, herself a computer programmer of leak detection sonar software for underground storage containers, insists on accompanying Tommy.

Driving to the site of the new natural park through a lonely wilderness, Rebecca asks Tommy to stop the car so that she can relieve herself at the side of the road. Meanwhile, Tommy leaves the car and is struck and killed suddenly by a passing vehicle.

Rebecca and Tommy's parents are stricken with grief. Rebecca wants to use new scientific advancements to have Tommy cloned because she can’t live without him, and wants to have his child. She offers to be impregnated using Tommy's DNA. Though Tommy's mother objects, his father agrees to give Rebecca Tommy's cell material, but urges her to think through her decision carefully before proceeding. Rebecca continues and conceives Tommy's clone in her womb. She visits original Tommy's grave while pregnant with his clone before giving birth by Caesarean section.

Tommy is now raised by Rebecca as a son, and the two are close. Tommy and his playmates observe a neighbourhood girl, described as a clone, and the children try to determine if she has a "copy smell." The neighbourhood mothers display prejudice against "copies," expecting Rebecca to forbid Tommy from associating with them. Rebecca, though upset, agrees in order not to isolate her son. Eventually rumours about Tommy spread, and Tommy is forced to celebrate his birthday alone with his mother, his playmates all being barred from attending by their mothers.

Rebecca moves to a more remote location with Tommy. Rebecca presents to him a pleo. Tommy begins to ask questions about his father, wanting to know how his father died. He buries the pleo his mother gave him for his birthday while out playing with a friend. His mother finds out and gives him back the pleo, which no longer works.

Years later, Tommy is a young adult, still living with Rebecca. Tommy has become more and more similar to the original Tommy. When Tommy brings his girlfriend Monica home, Rebecca shows happiness to see him in love, Tommy and his girlfriend proceed to have sex within earshot of Rebecca, but she doesn’t say anything about it. Original Tommy's mother, now an older woman, arrives unexpectedly and stares silently at Tommy, who feels like he recognises the stranger. Frightened and frustrated by Rebecca's lack of explanation, Tommy lashes out at Rebecca, ignoring Monica, who quickly departs.

An angry Tommy demands answers from his mother, Rebecca, who gives him the original Tommy's old laptop with photos of him and his original mother and father. Tommy throws his mother on the bed, and asks her who he is and why she did what she did. He then proceeds to rape her. She tries to fight him off at first, but gives in, living in the fantasy that he is the original Tommy before remembering again that this is her son. She goes limp. From the blood on Rebecca's bed, it is revealed that Tommy took her virginity in the process.

The next day, Tommy packs his things, then addresses Rebecca by her first name (and not "Mom") and thanks her for the life he's had. Then he leaves, without Rebecca doing anything to stop it.

== Cast ==
- Eva Green as Rebecca
  - Ruby O. Fee as Rebecca (9 years)
- Matt Smith as Thomas
  - Tristan Christopher as Thomas (10 years)
  - Jesse Hoffmann as Thomas (5 years)
- Lesley Manville as Judith, Thomas's mother
- Peter Wight as Ralph, Thomas's father
- István Lénárt as Henry, Rebecca's grandfather
- Hannah Murray as Monica, clone Thomas's girlfriend
- Natalia Tena as Rose, Thomas's one-time girlfriend
- Ella Smith as Molly
- Wunmi Mosaku as Erica
- Gina Alice Stiebitz as Dima
- Amanda Lawrence as Teacher

== Production ==
The film was shot in Germany on the islands of Langeneß and Sylt and in Sankt Peter-Ording, Hamburg and Berlin.

== Release ==
=== Critical reception ===
On Rotten Tomatoes, the film has received a rating of 35%, based on 20 reviews, with an average rating of 4.9/10.

On Metacritic, the film has a score of 48 out of 100, based on 8 critics, indicating "mixed or average reviews".
