= Jonas Kahnwald =

Fictional character from the TV show Dark

- Dark character
- Louis Hofmann as Jonas Kahnwald
- First appearance: "Secrets" (2017)
- Last appearance: "Paradise" (2020)
- Created by: Baran bo Odar; Jantje Friese
- Portrayed by: Jonas Gerzabek (child); Louis Hofmann (teenager); Andreas Pietschmann (adult); Dietrich Hollinderbäumer (old)

In-universe information
- Aliases: The Stranger; Adam
- Occupation: Student (formerly); Time traveller; Scientist
- Family: Michael Kahnwald (father); Hannah Kahnwald (mother); Silja Tiedemann (half-sister); Magnus Nielsen (uncle); Martha Nielsen (aunt); Ulrich Nielsen (grandfather); Katharina Nielsen (grandmother)
- Significant other: Martha Nielsen
- Children: The Unknown
- Nationality: German

Jonas Kahnwald is a fictional character and one of the protagonists in the German science fiction thriller show Dark (created by Baran bo Odar and Jantje Friese), portrayed by Jonas Gerzabek as a child, Louis Hofmann as a teenager, Andreas Pietschmann as an adult, and Dietrich Hollinderbäumer as an elderly man. He appears in 25 out of 26 episodes, making him the character with the most appearances in the show.

Jonas is the son of Hannah and Michael Kahnwald and starts off the show as a quiet somber teenager. After his father's suicide, Jonas unravels a rift in time in the Winden caves and begins his time travel journey. He returns as an adult to mentor his younger self and is referred to as The Stranger. After being trapped in 1888, Jonas tries to create a time travel machine so he can find the origin point of the time loop. He becomes physically scarred from this and begins going under the name of Adam.

The character is considered one of the show's best and both the character and Hofmann's performance have received positive reviews.

== Plot overview ==
Jonas is born in 2003 to Hannah and Michael Kahnwald.

On 20 June 2019, a teenage Jonas goes to the lake with his friends Bartosz Tiedemann and Martha and Magnus Nielsen. At the lake, Jonas and Martha find a pendant with Saint Christopher, the patron saint of travelers, on it. Jonas gifts the pendant to Martha before having to run off to help Ines Kahnwald, who he believes to be his paternal grandmother, with technology. That night, Jonas goes to Martha's house to celebrate her parents' 25th anniversary, where Martha returns the pendant to him and the two make love. The next day, Jonas's father Michael commits suicide by hanging himself.

After Michael's death, Jonas leaves the town of Winden to stay in a psychiatric ward. He returns in November 2019 and starts therapy with Peter Doppler. When he returns to school, he finds out that Martha has now started dating Bartosz and that his classmate Erik Obendorf is missing. That night, Jonas goes with Bartosz, Martha, Magnus and Martha's younger brother Mikkel to find Erik's missing drug stash near the Winden Caves. After hearing a strange sound coming from the caves, the group runs away from the caves. When they all regroup they find that Mikkel has gone missing.

Over the next few days, Jonas finds a map of the caves that belonged to his father which reads "Where is the Crossing?" The next day, the map is marked with a line revealing a passageway through the caves, and a day later Jonas receives a letter from an unknown person. The letter is his father suicide's note which reveals that the day Mikkel went missing, he travelled back in time to 1986 and became Michael Kahnwald. The next night, Jonas goes to the caves and travels through the passageway and arrives in 1986 where he runs into his mother who at this time is 14-years-old. In the morning, Jonas goes to the hospital where he sees Mikkel talking to a young Hannah. His plan to take Mikkel back to 2019 is stopped when a stranger appears and tells him that if he takes Mikkel back, Mikkel would never become his father and he would never exist.

Jonas returns to 2019 and blows off Martha after she kisses him in the rain as he now realizes Martha is his aunt. He visits Ines Kahnwald, who took Mikkel in when he arrived in 1986, and she gives him Michael's suicide letter, which Jonas thought he had burned. Jonas once more travels to 1986 with the intention of taking Mikkel back to 2019. When Jonas arrives at the hospital, he is kidnapped by Noah and an adult Helge Doppler, who locks him in the Doppler bunker. The Stranger meets him again on the other side of the bunker door and reveals that he is Jonas from 33 years in the future. He keeps Jonas locked in the bunker. As Jonas struggles to get out, a wormhole opens connecting a child Helge from 1953 to him. When the two touch, Jonas is sucked into the wormhole and ends up in the year 2052 where Winden has been partially destroyed by an apocalypse.

Jonas lives in the future for the next 7 months and stays away from a cult in the woods led by an adult Elisabeth Doppler and teenage soldier Silja. The cult has sanctioned the area surrounding the now-destroyed Winden Nuclear Power Plant as a dead zone which no one is allowed to enter. Jonas enters anyway and finds a time portal. With a lack of fuel to power the portal, Jonas steals some from the cult but is caught returning to the dead zone. Elisabeth hangs him in the woods but shoots the rope before Jonas is killed, leaving a scar around his neck. Silja frees Jonas from imprisonment, and Jonas enters the time portal and escapes 2053.

Jonas wakes up in June 1921 where he is mistaken for a post-World War I soldier. He is nursed by the inhabitants, which includes his great-great-grandmother Agnes Nielsen, who bandage up his neck scar. Jonas tries using the caves to get back to 2020, but the passage in the caves are yet to be built. When he comes out of the caves, a teenager takes him to meet Adam, the leader of the Sic Mundus group. When they arrive at the Winden church, the teenager is revealed to be a younger Noah, the man who kidnapped him in 1986. Jonas meets with Adam, who reveals he is an elder version of Jonas by showing him his neck scar. Adam tells Jonas there is a way to finally break the loop and he shows Jonas an improved version of the time portal Jonas saw in 2053, which he refers to as the "God Particle." This God Particle can break the 33-year-cycle and can take him to any point in time. On Adam's orders, he uses the God Particle to travel back to 20 June 2019, with a mission to stop his father Michael from committing suicide.

When in 2019, Jonas meets Martha and confesses his love for her by kissing her passionately. That night, Jonas goes to his house to confront his father while his past self and his mother are at the Nielsen's anniversary party. There, he begs his father not to commit suicide and shows him his own goodbye letter that he got from Ines. Michael confesses that he hasn't had any suicidal thoughts and that it was Jonas who sent him to 1986 in the first place. At that moment, an elder Claudia Tiedemann enters and tells Jonas that Adam manipulated him into convincing Michael to commit suicide in the first place. Claudia takes Jonas under her wing and teaches him everything he needs to know about time travel.

Jonas trains with Claudia for a year. On 26 June 1987, Jonas meets Claudia as an adult as she is grieving the death of her father. He tells her to come with him and that if things work, her father can be saved. Jonas takes Claudia into the caves where they collect a vial of Caesium-137 from a collection of yellow barrels that Bernd Doppler had hid in the caves in 1986. Using this vial, Jonas reopens the wormhole in the caves that his adult self had closed. (Note: As depicted in "Alpha and Omega") Jonas and Claudia exit the caves in 2020. Jonas gives Claudia a time machine and goes off to rescue his mother and Martha from the apocalypse. Jonas arrives at his house and finds Martha there. The two share a passionate kiss before Adam appears and shoots Martha, who soon dies in Jonas's arms.

As the apocalypse hits, the usage of quantum entanglement splits Jonas into three different realities which all exist simultaneously.

=== First Reality ===
When the apocalypse hits, Jonas saves himself by jumping into the basement of his house. He then spends the next three months trying to create the God Particle, and on 26 September 2020 is joined by adult Claudia, who has been living in 2020 ever since Jonas bought her to the year in June. Jonas and Claudia work fruitlessly to reactivate the God Particle. In 2023, Jonas goes to his old house and tries committing suicide by hanging himself but a young Noah arrives and stops him from doing so. He explains that Jonas cannot die because his older self already exists. Jonas begins to live with Noah and Elisabeth. In 2041, Noah's daughter Charlotte is kidnapped and Noah blames both Jonas and Claudia. He leaves to look for her throughout time.

==== As The Stranger ====
In 2052, the God Particle is finally ready to use. Claudia sends Jonas back to guide his younger self and to close the wormhole. He travels back to 2019 on the day after Mikkel's disappearance. He books a hotel room at Waldhotel Winden and meets his younger self at Michael's grave. He tells his younger self that Michael once saved his life, (Note: Jonas is referring to when Michael sacrificed himself to ensure Jonas is born, as seen in both "Secrets" and "An Endless Cycle") and later asks Regina Tiedemann to send his younger self Michael's goodbye letter, which he has been carrying around for 33 years.

Jonas uses the caves to travel to 1986 where he meets with clockmaker H.G. Tannhaus and the two have a talk about concepts such as Einstein-Rosen bridges, and the number 33 which has a lot of significance such as the amount of years it takes for the lunar-earth cycle to be complete, the amount of miracles Jesus performed, and the year the Antichrist began his reign. During this time, Jonas gives his broken time machine to Tannhaus for him to fix, and Jonas reveals to Tannhaus he plans to use the time machine to destroy the wormhole. While in 1986, Jonas also stops his younger self from taking Mikkel back to 2019.

After taking a small amount of caesium-137 from 2019, Tannhaus gives Jonas the brand-new time machine, which he only learnt how to create due to having seen the future version Jonas bought him. With this time machine in hand, Jonas goes to close the wormhole. There he comes into contact with his younger self once more and reveals his identity to him, leaving him in the bunker so he can be taken to 2052. Jonas closes the wormhole and waits 7 months before revealing himself and his identity to Hannah on 21 June 2020. The next day, he uses the time machine to take Hannah to 1987 and shows her Mikkel living with Ines, proving to her that Mikkel is Michael Kahnwald. Hannah introduces Charlotte to Jonas, and Charlotte, who has been investigating the possibility of time travel herself, believes that Jonas is from the future. Jonas tells Charlotte and Hannah about Noah and Sic Mundus, and later tells Katharina that Mikkel is his father and she is his grandmother, which she initially laughs at in disbelief.

Jonas breaks into the empty Nielsen house and places the Saint Christopher pendant, which Martha gave to him as a teenager, on Martha's bed. Jonas speaks to Charlotte and tells her that Noah was responsible for the deaths of Erik Obendorf, Mads Nielsen and Yasin Friese. He also tells Charlotte that Claudia used him, just how she used Peter and Tronte Nielsen. That night, Jonas tells Hannah he knew about her affair with Ulrich Nielsen, Martha's father, and asks if he would choose between Ulrich or Michael. The next day, Hannah is missing and has taken Jonas's time machine. Martha arrives looking for Hannah and instead meets Jonas, who reveals himself to her by recounting a previous encounter the two had when he was 35 years younger. (Note: As depicted in "Secrets") On the day of the apocalypse, wishing to prevent Martha's death he holds her at gunpoint and forces her into the Doppler bunker, telling her not to leave otherwise she will die. He then returns to the Kahnwald house prepared to shoot Adam before he can shoot Martha, but a teenage Noah from 1921 arrives instead. Noah gives him a letter supposedly written by Martha, in which Martha explains that Jonas has to let him die in order for her to live. On Noah's command, he saves Magnus, Franziska and Bartosz using the time machine before the apocalypse hits, taking them to 1888.

In September 1888, the teenage Martha from another world arrives, someone Jonas is shocked to see. Jonas asks alternate Martha if she wrote the letter Noah gave him, but she denies writing it just as Jonas denies ever being in the alternate world. Alternate Martha reveals she is here to help Jonas find the origin point of the two worlds. Due to the lack of nuclear energy in the 19th century and the time machine having run out of fuel, Jonas and his childhood friends are trapped in the past. Alternate Martha gives Jonas a fuel cell as a sign of trust, claiming it is her last one. That night, the alternate Martha disappears. Jonas uses the fuel she gave him to try and create the God Particle he previously saw in 1921. By 1890, Jonas has become consumed with his quest to create the God Particle and find the origin point. In his attempts to create the God Particle, he receives various scars and becomes disfigured.

==== As Adam ====
In 1911, Jonas's mother Hannah arrives with her daughter Silja. Jonas, now going by Adam, kills his mother and uses the God Particle to take Silja to the year 2041 where his younger self will eventually meet her. In 1920, an adult Noah arrives looking for his daughter Charlotte. Adam lies to Noah and tells him Claudia was to blame for Charlotte's disappearance. He recruits Noah back into Sic Mundus and gives him the task of creating the first time machine using Helge's help.

In June 1921, Adam gives Noah the task of finding the missing pages of Claudia's notebook ahead of the apocalypse. He also tells teenage Noah to kill Bartosz, as he can sense his childhood friend is losing faith in Sic Mundus. When the teenage Jonas arrives in 1921, Adam sends teenage Noah to collect him and bring him to the Sic Mundus headquarters. Adam reveals he is the elder Jonas to his younger self and sends Jonas on a mission to stop Michael's suicide, knowing full well it won't work. On the day of the apocalypse, Adam sends teenage Noah to 2020 so that he can conceive Charlotte with Elisabeth. After his teenage self leaves, the adult Noah reveals he found the missing pages days ago with the pages revealing Adam has been manipulating him the whole time. An angry Noah tries to kill him, but the gun jams. Instead, Adam gets Agnes, Noah's sister, to kill Noah. He gets the adult Magnus and Franziska to send him to 2020 where Adam kills Martha.

Adam and Sic Mundus set up their headquarters in 2053 where he meets with the alternate Martha Nielsen, cutting a deal with her that if she manipulates his past self, he will tell her the origin which he found from the final pages. Adam reveals that Martha is pregnant with Jonas's child, and that that child born of two worlds is the origin and must be destroyed. Adam sends his followers: Agnes, Silja, Charlotte, Elisabeth, Magnus, and Franziska, to travel through the God Particle to maintain the Knot and make sure the timeline is preserved, so that Adam can use the power of both of the apocalypses to destroy Martha and her child. However, he finds that after he kills Martha, nothing happens. An elder Claudia appears and tells Adam that alternate Martha's elder self, self-named "Eva", used quantum entanglement during the apocalypse, when there was a large amount of caesium in the air, to split alternate Martha into two realities, one where she becomes Eva and one where Adam kills her. Claudia also reveals there was an origin world where Tannhaus created time travel in an effort to prevent the death of his son and daughter-in-law.

Adam travels back to the day of the apocalypse and saves his younger self from the blast, creating a third reality. He brings Jonas to Eva's world and instructs Jonas to save the alternate Martha and destroy the two worlds by stopping Tannhaus. Adam then uses the caves to meet with Eva in 2052. Eva reveals she knows what happens because she saw Adam kill her when she was younger, but instead Adam spares her and Eva realises the Knot has been broken. The two embrace and hold hands as they are erased from existence.

=== Second Reality ===
Jonas is saved from the apocalypse by the alternate version of teenage Martha. She brings him to her world before disappearing. In this world, Jonas finds many things are different such as Franziska being deaf instead of her sister Elisabeth, or Martha is dating Killian Obendorf instead of Bartosz. Jonas also finds out that he doesn't exist in this world due to Mikkel not travelling back in time. After many attempts to talk with Martha from the alternate world, who doesn't recognize him due to her not having met him yet, Jonas is confronted by Eva and he finds out in this universe the apocalypse will occur on 8 November 2019 instead of 27 July 2020 which is when it happens in his world.

Jonas meets the alternate Martha once more and convinces her to come into the caves with him. The two go from 2019 to 2052 where they are approached by Martha's adult self, who tell them they have a chance to save one of the two worlds by stopping the apocalypse in Eva's World. However, Jonas will be forced to choose between Mikkel living in his world or Martha living in Eva's world. Jonas and Martha return to 2019 and make love. The next day, Jonas and Martha go to the nuclear power plant to try and hide the yellow barrels. When Martha gets a small cut on her cheek, identical to the one that she had when she saved him from the apocalypse, Jonas realizes he's been lied to. He confronts Eva and adult Martha before a future version of teenage Martha appears and shoots him dead. He dies in Martha's arms.

=== Third Reality ===
On the day of the apocalypse, Jonas is saved by Adam from the First Reality. Adam takes him to Eva's world and explains that Tannhaus created time travel and that Jonas and the alternate Martha have to stop him. Adam gives Jonas a time travel machine, and Jonas rescues the alternate Martha before she joins Sic Mundus. Jonas and Martha travel into the caves of Adam's world on 21 June 1986, the day Tannhaus destroyed his world and created Adam's and Eva's. They are brought to a place between the three worlds, where Jonas sees a child version of alternate Martha after being separated from her teenage self. Jonas and Martha eventually reunite and use the machine to travel to the origin world, where they appear in front of Tannhaus’ son Marek and his wife Sonja. They tell them the bridge is closed leading them to go back to Tannhaus’ house and not be involved in the accident that killed them. As Jonas and Martha disappear from existence, he holds Martha's hands telling her that they're a perfect match and to never think otherwise.

== Production ==
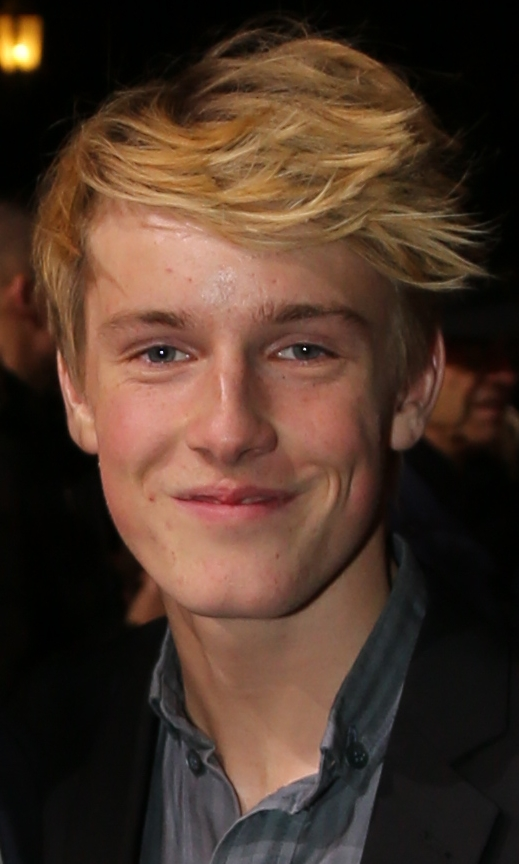
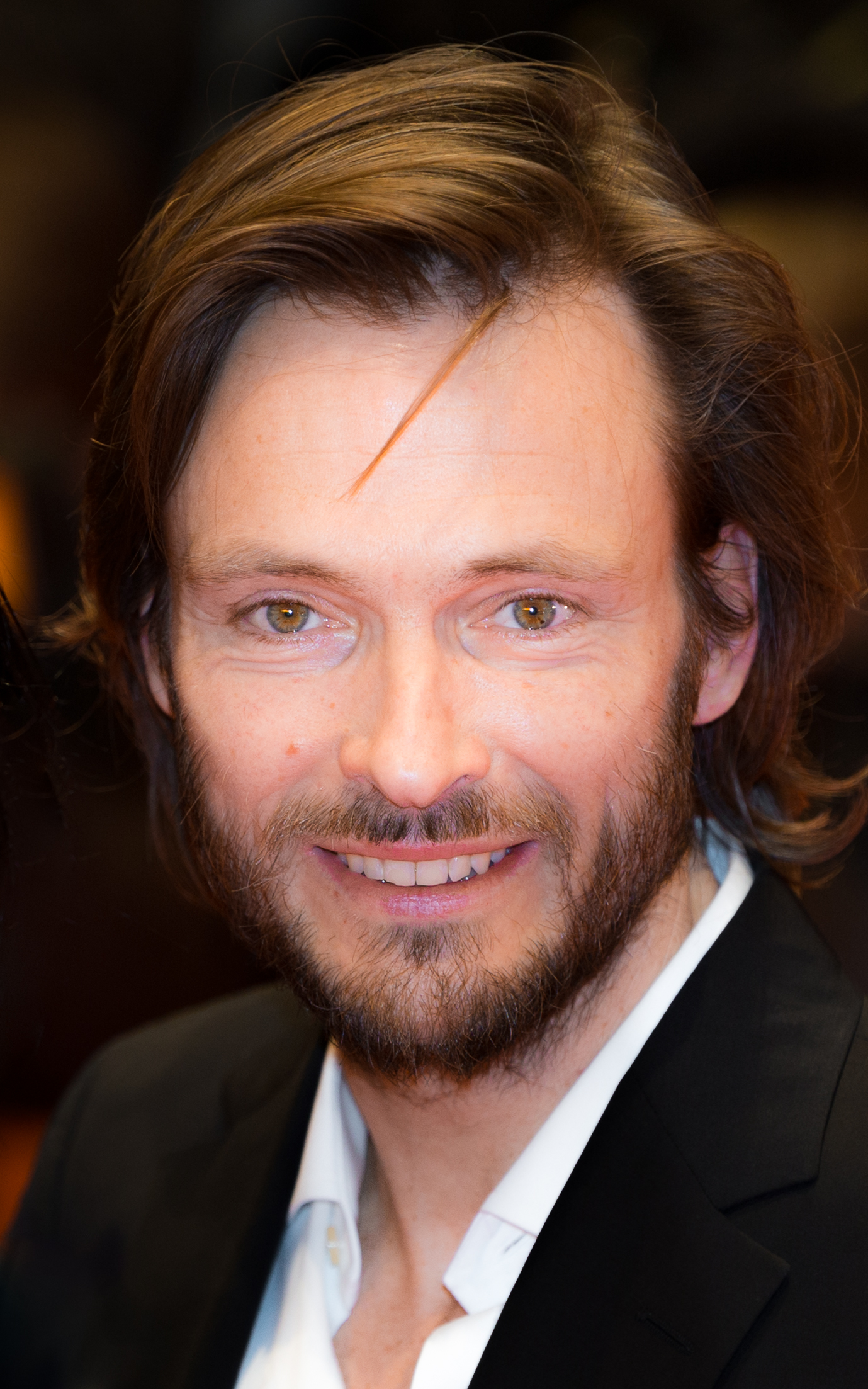
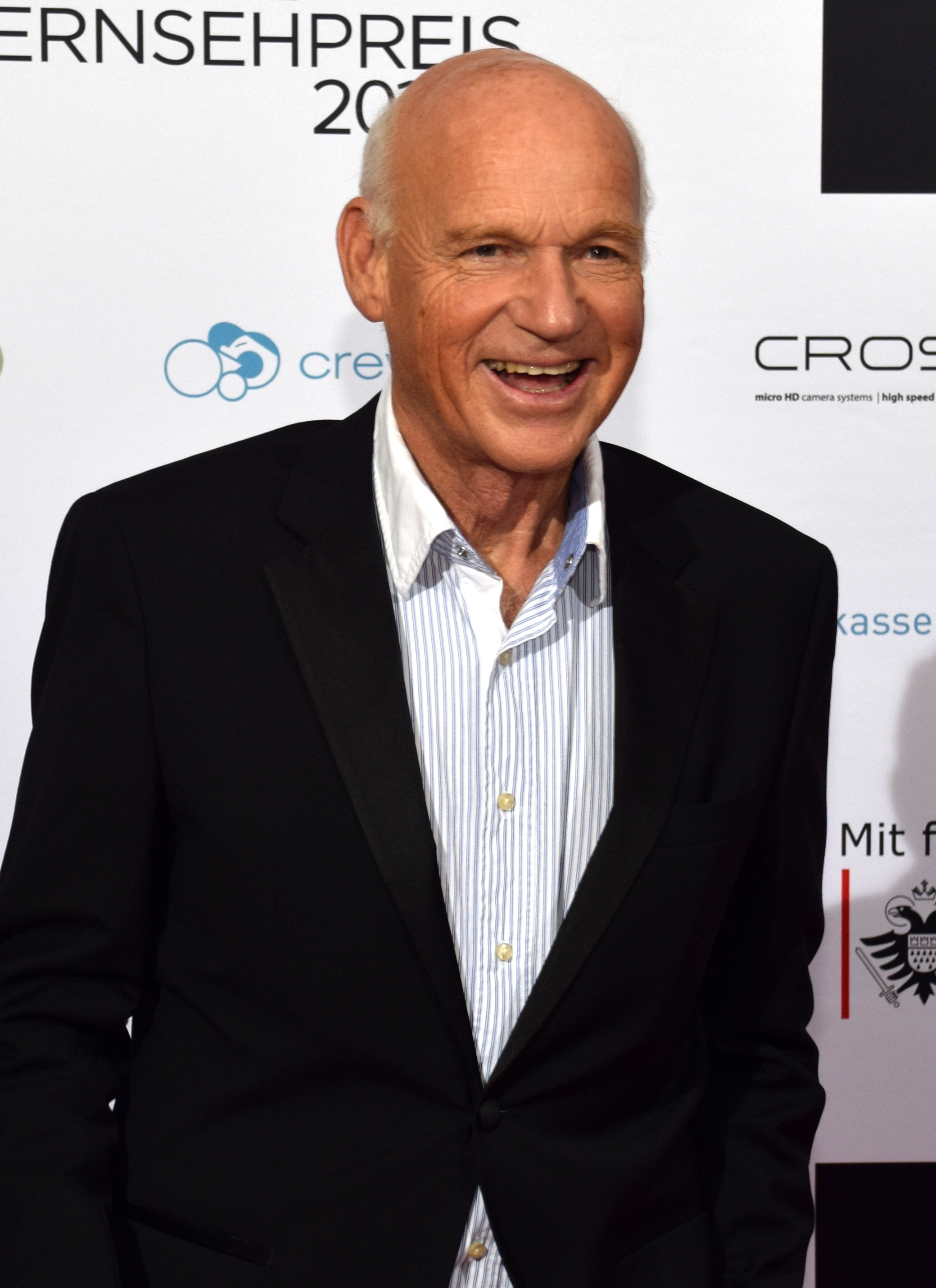
Louis Hofmann, Andreas Pietschmann and Dietrich Hollinderbäumer, who play Jonas's teenage, adult, and elder selves.

The character of Jonas was mainly played by three different actors: In the first season, Louis Hofmann plays teenage Jonas and Andreas Pietschmann plays the adult Jonas, credited as "The Stranger". Pietschmann's character was only revealed to be the adult Jonas in the first season's finale. The second season introduces Dietrich Hollinderbäumer as Adam, the leader of the Sic Mundus group, who is later revealed to be Jonas's elder self in the fourth episode of the season. On the character, Hofmann stated Jonas is "very reserved and a very broken character, but then he strives so much for the truth and has so much drive and will and strength." Pietschmann stated that the three actors never talked to each other about the role and that "[it] wouldn’t be helpful to try to imitate each other: how do you lift that cup? How do you say this word? The richness of the character comes from it being played by three actors." Jonas Gerzabek also plays the character as a child in the series finale.

The character was created by series creators Baran bo Odar and Jantje Friese. He appears in all 26 episodes except the third episode of the first season. On writing the character's fate, series director Odar chose to view Jonas's sacrifice as a happy ending stating that "I always liked the idea that there are two components who are opponents, fighting each other all of the time, actually having to realize that they are not important. They have to realize that, yes, we suffer and we have pain and desires, but we two are not so important that we must exist so someone else can’t be happy."

== Reception ==
Jonas Kahnwald is considered one of the best characters in the show. Nishid Motwani of Screen Rant listed Jonas as the best character saying "Jonas is the one who binds the mysteries surrounding Winden; consequently, he is the most important (and best) character in Dark." Brian Sheridan from Comic Book Resources stated that Hofmann gives the second best performance in the show behind Julika Jenkins writing that "[he] could not have been better as the most prominent version of Jonas' character. Jonas often spirals through uncertainty, confusion, and fear, with Hofmann's voice and expressions perfectly embodying every word and feeling Jonas has to sort through," while also writing that Jonas's raw determination comes "as naturally as breathing to Hofmann."

For his performance in the first season of Dark, Hofmann won the Junior Actor Prize at the Goldene Kamera in 2018.
