= Torch Song (2024 film) =

2024 film

- Directed by: Jeroen Houben
- Written by: Jeroen Houben
- Produced by: Noortje Wilschut; Floor Onrust
- Starring: Carla Juri; Markoesa Hamer; Al Weaver
- Cinematography: Aziz Al-Dilaimi
- Edited by: Lot Rossmark
- Music by: Jeroen Houben
- Production company: Family Affairs Films
- Distributed by: Gusto Entertainment
- Release dates: October 17, 2024 (Woodstock Film Festival); January 23, 2025 (Netherlands)
- Running time: 90 minutes
- Country: Netherlands
- Languages: English; Dutch

Torch Song is a 2024 drama film directed and written by Jeroen Houben in his English-language feature debut. Shot on location in Amsterdam, the film stars Carla Juri, Al Weaver and Markoesa Hamer. Noortje Wilschut and Floor Onrust serve as producers for Family Affair Films.

== Synopsis ==
After the death of her mother, singer Liz Alexander decides to pay a visit to her half-brother Gabe in Amsterdam. Gabe, an aspiring writer, fears being outshone by his eccentric sibling. Adding insult to injury, Liz sets her sights on Gabe's girlfriend Joey, an art model who ignites Liz's creative fervor.

== Cast ==
- Carla Juri as Liz Alexander
- Markoesa Hamer as Joey
- Al Weaver as Gabe Alexander
- Ariane Schluter as Art teacher
- Boris van Severen as Milan

== Release ==
The film premiered at the Netherlands Film Festival on September 21, 2024, where it won the Dutch film Critics Award. The international premiere took place at the Woodstock Film Festival on October 17, 2024. The film will have its theatrical release in The Netherlands on January 23, 2025 by Gusto Entertainment.

== Soundtrack ==
Actress Carla Juri performs several songs in the film, which were recorded live on set. The music for the film was composed by director Jeroen Houben. A soundtrack album was released on 20 september, 2024, on Snowstar Records.
