= Play Dead (upcoming film) =

American psychological thriller film

- Directed by: Jaume Collet-Serra
- Written by: Peter Stanley-Ward; Natalie Conway
- Produced by: Akiva Nemetsky; Keaton Heinrichs; Sam Raimi; Rob Tapert; J. D. Lifshitz; Raphael Margules; Dane Eckerle
- Starring: Noah Jupe; Matthias Schweighöfer; Patrick Gibson; Andreas Pietschmann; Sean Keenan; Joel Jackson
- Cinematography: Stephen F. Windon
- Edited by: Sean Lahiff; Krisztian Majdik
- Production companies: Nocturnal Entertainment; Ghost House Pictures; Renaissance Pictures; BoulderLight Pictures; Bad Grey
- Distributed by: Netflix
- Country: United States
- Language: English

Play Dead is an upcoming American psychological thriller film directed by Jaume Collet-Serra and written by Peter Stanley-Ward and Natalie Conway. It stars Noah Jupe, Matthias Schweighöfer, Patrick Gibson, Andreas Pietschmann, Sean Keenan and Joel Jackson.

== Cast ==
- Noah Jupe
- Matthias Schweighöfer
- Patrick Gibson
- Andreas Pietschmann
- Sean Keenan
- Joel Jackson
- Fraser Anderson
- Harrison Quast

== Production ==
In February 2025, it was announced that Jaume Collet-Serra would be directing a psychological thriller film, from a script by Peter Stanley-Ward and Natalie Conway. Principal photography began in May 2025 in Melbourne, with Stephen F. Windon serving as the cinematographer. Concurrently, Noah Jupe, Matthias Schweighöfer, Patrick Gibson, Andreas Pietschmann, Sean Keenan, Joel Jackson, Fraser Anderson, and Harrison Quast were announced as part of the cast.

== Release ==
In April 2026, Netflix acquired distribution rights to the film.
