= Morgen hör ich auf =

- Starring: Bastian Pastewka; Susanne Wolff; Moritz Jahn; Janina Fautz; Katharina Kron; Margarita Broich; Georg Friedrich; André Jung; Uwe Preuss; Wolfgang Rüter
- Country of origin: Germany
- Original language: German
- No. of seasons: 1
- No. of episodes: 5

Production
- Producer: Network Movie Film-und Fernsehproduktion
- Running time: 60 min

Original release
- Network: ZDF
- Release: 2 January – 30 January 2016

Morgen hör ich auf (transl. Tomorrow I Quit) is a German television series that premiered on 2 January 2016 on ZDF. It stars Bastian Pastewka, Susanne Wolff, Moritz Jahn, Georg Friedrich, and André Jung.

== Plot ==
The Lehmanns are a German average family - three children, houses, car - and live in the small town of Bad Nauheim in Hesse, near Frankfurt. What looks like a showpiece family from the outside shows strong internal cracks, just like the broken house roof and the water damage in the bedroom. The family printing is deep in the crisis, the credit on the house has long been at the stop, and father Jochen threatens to collapse under the financial pressure. Mother Julia is having fun with a lover, son Vincent is a nerd, teenage daughter Laura only has her "crush" in her head, and baby nestling Nadine (Katharina Kron) is rather a small one devil than the cute sunshine for which they hold their parents. But Jochen gets almost nothing from it, desperately he tries to keep the bill and get a new loan from the bank. But no matter how much he humbles himself, the bankers turn the tap, and house and company are constantly slipping toward the abyss. In an act of blind desperation, Jochen throws his printing presses one night and begins to print fifty "fifties": If everyone wants money from him, then he does it himself. He quickly comes to his senses, but then it is already too late: one phony is making its way into the economic cycle. When nothing happens, Jochen continues and begins to bring the counterfeit money in Frankfurt under the people. He draws attention to the Frankfurt underworld, and suddenly he gets deeper and deeper into a vortex of criminal machinations from which he can not get out.

== Cast ==
- Bastian Pastewka
- Susanne Wolff
- Moritz Jahn
- Janina Fautz
- Katharina Kron
- Margarita Broich
- Georg Friedrich
- André Jung
- Uwe Preuss
- Wolfgang Rüter

== Episodes ==
No. overall	No. in season	Title	Directed by	Written by	German air date	Prod. code	German viewers (millions)
1	1	"Schöner Schein"	Martin Eigler	Sönke Lars Neuwöhner	2 January 2016	TBA	4.49
The bankrupt vulture circling over the neat family home of the Lehmanns in Bad Nauheim. Jochen Lehmann's printing house has no more orders and the family gets out of hand. There is an urgent need for money.
2	1	"Wechselgeschäfte"	Martin Eigler	Sven Poser	9 January 2016	TBA	4.19
Jochen gets a visit from gangster Damir Decker. He demands the pressure of another million. Jochen has no choice. While he is literally printing for his life, Damir nestles with Jochen.
3	1	"Talfahrt"	Martin Eigler	Unknown	16 January 2016	TBA	3.22
That's what Jochen thought up: A deal with banker Tauchert and he would be off the hook. But he falls off after a stroke and Jochen now has to save his own skin. The Lehmanns are getting deeper into chaos. In an attempt to pull their own head out of the noose, Jochen and Julia take no account of anyone.
4	1	"Zahltag"	Martin Eigler	Sven Poser, Sönke Lars Neuwöhner	23 January 2016	TBA	3.17
Julia and Jochen have the upper hand in the negotiations with Blaschko. Then Jochen learns of Julia's affair with Rolf. Jochen wants to confront him, but Rolf is dead in his bar.
5	1	"Heute hör ich auf"	Martin Eigler	Sven Poser, Sönke Lars Neuwöhner	30 January 2016	TBA	2.78
When Jochen sees that Commissioner Schnabelbach has Julia in his power, it is clear to him that the policeman plays a double game and is with the criminal Blaschko under a blanket.

== See also ==
- List of German television series
