= André Jung (actor) =

Luxembourgish actor

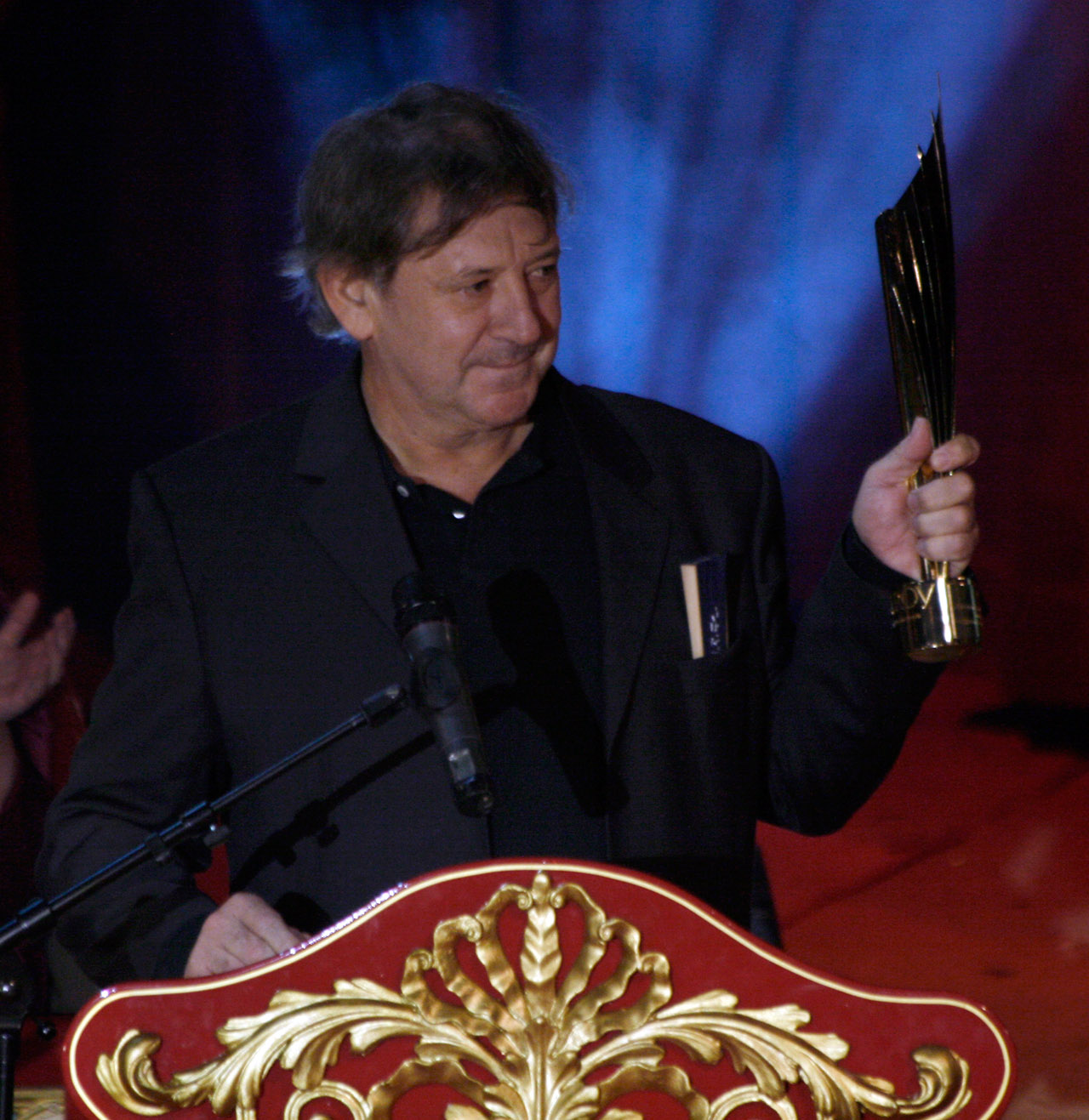
- Jung in 2009
- Born: 13 December 1953 (age 72); Luxembourg
- Occupation: Actor
- Years active: 1985–present

André Jung (born 13 December 1953) is a Luxembourgish theatre and film actor. He studied performing arts at the State University of Music and Performing Arts Stuttgart and subsequently worked at various theatres, including the Theater Basel, the Deutsches Schauspielhaus in Hamburg, and the Schauspielhaus Zürich.

== Selected filmography ==
Film
Year	Title	Role	Notes
2001	Das Experiment		
2012	Blind Spot	Inspector Hastert	
2014	Coming In		
2016	Das Tagebuch der Anne Frank		
2016	Egon Schiele: Death and the Maiden		
2019	Lara		

TV
Year	Title	Role	Notes
2016	Morgen hör ich auf	Andreas Gerlach	
2022	Capitani	Gilbert ‘Gibbes’ König	

== Awards ==
- Nestroy Prize (2009)
- Gertrud-Eysoldt-Ring (2018)
