= GSG 9 – Ihr Einsatz ist ihr Leben =

2007 German TV series

- GSG 9 Title Card
- Created by: Florian Kern
- Starring: Marc Benjamin Puch; Bülent Sharif; Andreas Pietschmann
- Country of origin: Germany
- No. of seasons: 2
- No. of episodes: 25

Original release
- Network: Sat.1
- Release: March 7, 2007 – May 29, 2008

GSG 9 (Grenzschutzgruppe 9, literally Border Guard Group 9) is a German TV series about the special unit GSG 9 der Bundespolizei of the German Federal Police. It premiered in the spring of 2007.

Its original title, GSG 9 - Ihr Einsatz ist ihr Leben, is a pun on the word Einsatz. Einsatz can be translated as "mission, stake, bet, dedication", depending on the context. Thus, it can be translated as, GSG 9 - Their Mission Is Their Life or GSG 9 - They Put Their Lives at Stake.

== Plot summary ==
The series revolves about the members of a fictional GSG 9 unit summoned by the Federal Police to conduct operations where the regular police cannot handle such as terrorism, hijacking and kidnapping. The unit is also deployed abroad to countries like Belarus to assist state security forces in rescuing German nationals/retake German diplomatic buildings.

== Main cast ==
- Geb Schurlau (Marc Ben Puch)
- Demir Azlan (Bülent Sharif)
- Konny von Brendorp (Andreas Pietschmann)
- Caspar Reindl (Bert Böhlitz)
- Frank Wernitz (Jorres Risse)
- Thomas Anhoff (André Hennicke)
- Petra Helmholtz (Florentine Lahme)

== Broadcasting ==
The series's first season aired from March 8, 2007, to May 30, 2007, on Sat.1, on Wednesdays at 8:15 PM. The second season premiered in the Spring of 2008 and comprised twelve episodes.

It premièred in Italy on March 24, 2008, and was aired from Monday to Friday at 18.40 on Steel and airs in Spain as GSG 9: Cuerpo de Élite by Calle 13. The show is also aired in Japan on WOWOW; in Brazil, as Equipe Especial 9 (Special Team 9), on A&E Mundo; and in Latin America, as Unidad Especial 9 (Special Unit 9), on A&E.

== Ratings ==
Seasonal Ratings of GSG 9.

Season	Timeslot (EDT)	Season Premiere	Season Finale	TV Season	Viewers (in millions)
1	Wednesday 8:15PM	March 8, 2007	May 30, 2007	2006/2007	2,41
2	Thursday 8:15PM	February 14, 2008	May 29, 2008	2007/2008	1,74
