= Styx (film) =

2018 film

- Film poster
- Directed by: Wolfgang Fischer
- Written by: Wolfgang Fischer; Ika Künzel
- Produced by: Marcos Kantis; Martin Lehwald; Michal Pokorny; Alexander Dumreicher-Ivanceanu; Bady Minck
- Starring: Susanne Wolff; Gedion Oduor Wekesa
- Cinematography: Benedict Neuenfels
- Edited by: Monika Willi
- Music by: Dirk von Lowtzow
- Production company: Schiwago Film
- Distributed by: Beta Cinema
- Release date: 16 February 2018 (Berlin)
- Running time: 95 minutes
- Countries: Germany; Austria
- Languages: English; German

Styx is a 2018 German-Austrian drama film directed by Wolfgang Fischer. The film features Susanne Wolff as Rike, an emergency doctor who is sailing her yacht solo off North Africa when she comes across a boat full of asylum seekers in distress after a storm has damaged their vessel. Styx was screened in the Panorama section at the 68th Berlin International Film Festival. It was highly praised by critics and won many awards, including at the German Directors Guild Awards, the German Film Awards, Boulder International Film Festival, and the FIPRESCI Prize at the Ljubljana International Film Festival, and was nominated for many others.

== Plot ==
Rike is a German emergency doctor. For her holiday she decided to sail alone on her twelve-metre long yacht "Asa Gray", on a trip in the footsteps of Charles Darwin from Gibraltar to Ascension Island in the South Atlantic. During her journey off North Africa, she is informed by a container ship passing nearby that she must prepare for a severe storm on her way.

After the violent storm that night, she discovers a damaged and overloaded trawler near her boat. Containing over a hundred people, threatened with death by drowning, they wave and shout towards her yacht. Rike tries to contact the boat by radio. When she does not receive an answer, she tries to contact rescue teams and organise the rescue. However, the requests for help remain largely unanswered at first, although several vessels can be seen nearby on the onboard radar. Coastguards are warned and promise help, but this will take many hours. The captain of the transport ship, who had promised support before the storm, informs her that his shipping company has prohibited any involvement in the rescue at sea of refugees.

Through her binoculars, Rike notices passengers falling or jumping into the water. A 14-year-old boy swims and reaches the yacht. With the help of a lifebuoy, she rescues the exhausted boy from the water and hoists him onto her ship. The boy's name is Kingsley, which is written on his wristband. Rike moves away from the trawler, so as not to provoke further attempts, as her boat is too small to accommodate all the passengers. She gives first aid to Kingsley, bandages his wounds, and puts him on an IV drip. She calls the coastguard again by radio, who promise her that help is on its way and that she must stay away from the refugee boat.

Kingsley, who speaks some English, regains consciousness and tries to pressure Rike to come to the rescue of the trawler where, among others, his sister is on. He struggles with Rike to get the ignition key of the yacht, even pushing her overboard. After starting the engine and moving somewhat away, Kingsley stops the engine again, and Rike climbs back on deck with difficulty. Shocked by this act, she is furious with Kingsley, but notices his despair and calls the coastguard again, claiming that the "Asa Gray" will sink now. After the SOS, she cuts the ship's electrical system and activates her distress beacon.

The following night, she approaches the trawler, climbs aboard and finds a number of dead and dying people on the ship. At dawn, the tenders of a Coast Guard frigate shuttle with the abandoned trawler to rescue the survivors and recover the dead, while radio messages about other ships in distress arrive, each with hundreds of refugees on board. Rike is recovered by the frigate. Traumatized and unable to answer the questions of the coastguards, she is informed that proceedings are being brought against her.

== Cast ==
- Susanne Wolff as Rike
- Gedion Wekesa Oduor as Kingsley
- Alexander Beyer as Paul
- Inga Birkenfeld as Marie

== Production ==
Styx is a German-Austrian production. It is a drama film directed by Wolfgang Fischer.

The film was produced by Schiwago Film in co-production with Amour Fou Vienna, and international distribution is handled by Beta Cinema.

== Release ==
Styx had its world premiere in the Panorama section at the 68th Berlin International Film Festival on 16 February 2018.

== Reception ==
=== Critical response ===
On review aggregator website Rotten Tomatoes, the film holds an approval rating of 93% based on 44 reviews, with an average rating of 7.7/10. The site's critical consensus reads, "Anchored by powerful work from Susanne Wolff, Styx provocatively depicts mankind at war with itself and the natural world – and argues our best weapon is compassion." Metacritic, which uses a weighted average, assigned the film a score of 78 out of 100, based on 10 critics, indicating "generally favorable" reviews.

== Awards and nominations ==
=== 2018 ===
Styx won or was nominated for the following awards in 2018:

- AFI Fest – Nominee, Audience Award, New Authors (Wolfgang Fischer)
- Batumi International ArtHouse Film Festival – Winner, Special Prize of the Jury
- Berlin International Film Festival – Nominee, Panorama Audience Award, Fiction Film
- Winner, Prize of the Ecumenical Jury, Panorama Label Europa Cinemas
- Heiner Carow Prize, Emden International Film Festival – Winner, Creative Energy Award, Best Creative Performance
- European Film Awards – Nominee, European University Film Award
- German Directors Award Metropolis – Winner, Best Director Feature Film (Wolfgang Fischer); Winner, Best Actress (Susanne Wolff)
- Guenter Rohrbach Filmpreis – Nominee, Best Film; Winner Best Female Actor (Susanne Wolff)
- Hong Kong International Film Festival – Nominee, Golden Firebird Award, Young Cinema
- International Istanbul Film Festival – Nominee Human Rights Competition
- Jerusalem Film Festival – Nominee In Spirit for Freedom Award, Best Feature
- Ljubljana International Film Festival – Winner FIPRESCI Prize, Best Film
- LUX Prize – Nominee Lux Prize, Best Film
- Odessa International Film Festival – Nominee Golden Duke, International Competition
- Philadelphia Film Festival – Nominee Jury Award, Best Narrative Feature
- Reykjavik International Film Festival – Nominee Golden Puffin, Best Film; Winner Golden Puffin, Special Mention
- Schwerin Art of Film Festival – Winner, Flying Ox; Best Feature (Wolfgang Fischer); Best Sound Mixing (Tobias Fleig, Uwe Dresch, Adrian Baumeister); Winner, Audience Award, Best Film
- Stockholm Film Festival – Nominee, Bronze Horse, Best Film
- Valletta Film Festival – Winner, Triton Award; Best Actress (Susanne Wolff); Best Cinematographer (Benedict Neuenfels)
- Viennale – Winner, ExtraVALUE Film Award, Best Feature Film

Styx also won the European Cinema Label honour for best European film running in the Panorama section of the Berlinale, awarded by Europa Cinemas, the association of European art house cinemas. This includes distribution support across Europe.

=== 2019 ===
Styx won or was nominated for the following awards in 2019:

- Austrian Film Award – Winner, Best Director (Wolfgang Fischer); Best Screenplay (Wolfgang Fischer, Ika Künzel); Best Film Editing (Monika Willi)
- Bavarian Film Awards – Winner, Best Cinematography (Benedict Neuenfels)
- Boulder International Film Festival – Winner, BIFF Award, Best Feature Film; Call to Action Award
- German Film Awards – Nominee, Film Award in Gold; Best Director (Wolfgang Fisher); Best Editing (Monika Willi); Winner, Film Award in Silver, Outstanding Feature Film; Best Performance by an Actress in a Leading Role (Susanne Wolff); Best Cinematography (Benedict Neuenfels); Best Sound (Andreas Turnwald, Uwe Dresch, André Zimmerman, Tobias Fleig)
- German Film Critics Association Awards – Nominee, Best Cinematography (Benedict Neuenfels); Best Editing (Monika Willi)
- Luxembourg City Film Festival – Winner, Youth Jury Award
- Palm Springs International Film Festival – Nominee, New Voices/New Visions Grand Jury Prize
- Portland International Film Festival – Nominee, Audience Award Best Narrative Feature

=== 2020 ===
In 2020, Styx' won Best Feature Film and Best Cinematography (Benedict Neuenfels) at the Zsigmond Vilmos Film Festival.
