= Donkey Days =

2025 German-Dutch drama film

- Festival poster
- Directed by: Rosanne Pel
- Screenplay by: Rosanne Pel
- Produced by: Floor Onrust
- Starring: Jil Krammer; Susanne Wolff; Carla Juri
- Cinematography: Aafke Beernink
- Edited by: Xander Nijsten
- Music by: Ella van der Woude
- Production companies: Family Affair Films; VPRO [nl]; Junafilm
- Distributed by: Gusto Entertainment (NL); Saltzgeber (DE)
- Release date: 10 August 2025 (Locarno)
- Running time: 108 minutes
- Countries: Germany; Netherlands
- Languages: German; Dutch

Donkey Days is a 2025 German-Dutch drama film written and directed by Rosanne Pel and starring Jil Krammer and Susanne Wolff, it follows two sisters Anna and Charlotte, who have always fought for their mother’s attention. After a family vacation, Anna confronts her mother and sister, for autonomy as she seeks to reclaim her independence.

The film had its world premiere in the main competition of the 78th Locarno Film Festival on 10 August 2025, where it was nominated for the Golden Leopard.

== Synopsis ==
Anna returns from a vacation with her mother and sister visibly distressed, though initially unable to articulate the cause. Over time, she discloses that her family pressured her into dieting, revealing an underlying pattern of control and dependency. This dynamic begins to impact her relationship with her girlfriend, who feels increasingly alienated. Struggling between familial loyalty and the desire for personal autonomy, Anna confronts the influence her family holds over her, leading to a critical decision about her future.

== Cast ==
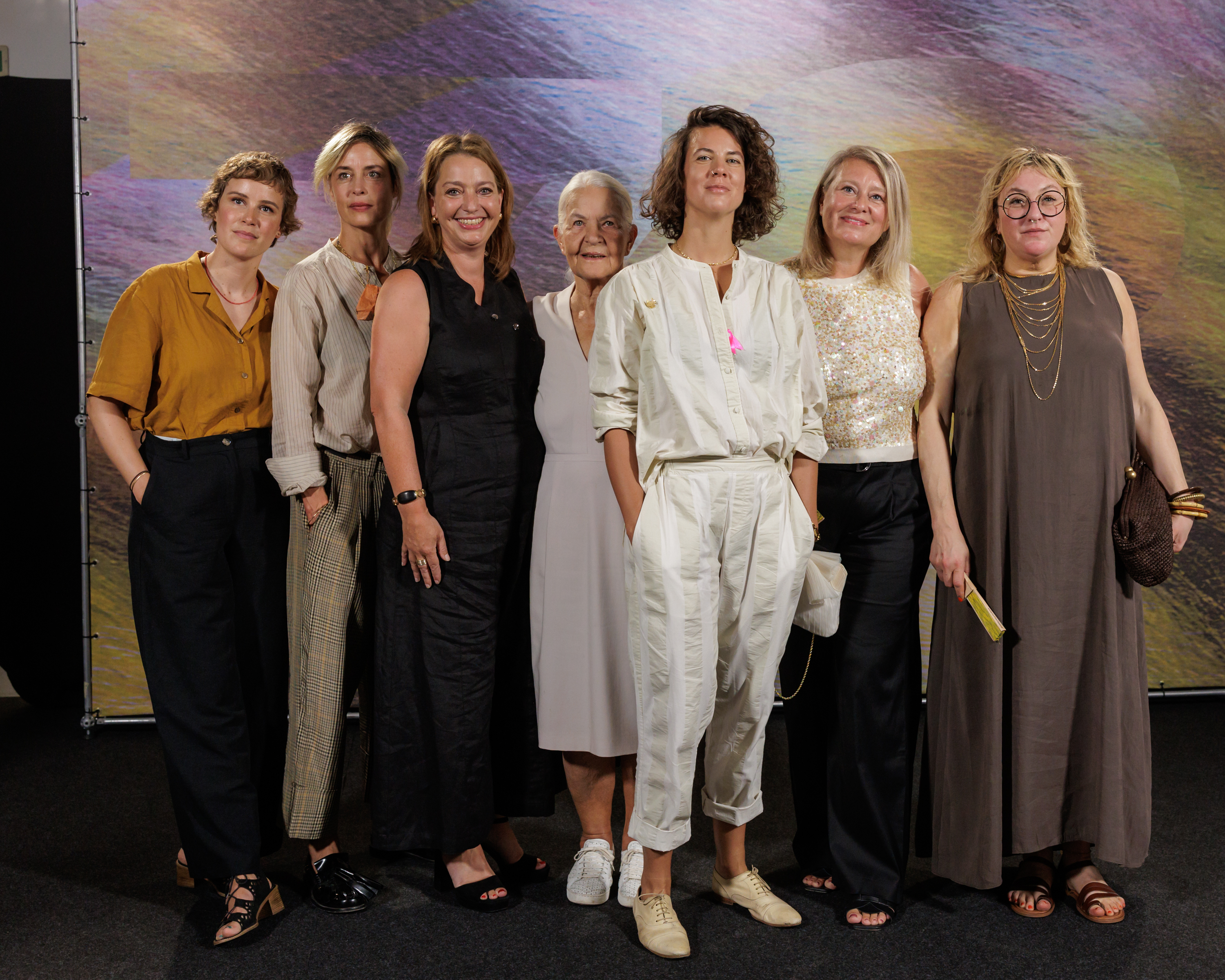
Cast and crew during Locarno 2025 premiere

- Jil Krammer as Anna
- Susanne Wolff as Charlotte
- Hildegard Schmahl as Ines
- Carla Juri as Ines (38 years)
- Amke Wegner

== Production ==
In February 2020, Rosanne Pel presented her film tentatively titled as Calf’s Head at the TorinoFilmLab, a Script Lab workshop to develop the script. In March 2022, the project was selected tentatively titled as Anna Ist in the Cannes’ Cinéfondation Atelier for encouraging creative filmmaking.

The film is produced by Floor Onrust for Family Affair Films and co-produced by Junafilm. It was funded by the German Federal Film Board, MOIN Film Fund Hamburg Schleswig-Holstein, and Netherlands Film Fund among others.

The film was shot for 40 days at the locations in Schleswig-Holstein, Germany and the Netherlands.

== Release ==
Donkey Days had its World Premiere at the 78th Locarno Film Festival on 10 August 2025, and compete for Golden Leopard. It also competed in New Directors Competition at the São Paulo International Film Festival and had screening on 16 October 2025.

In July 2025, Paris-based Totem Films acquired the international sales rights of the film.

== Accolades ==
Award	Date of ceremony	Category	Recipient	Result	Ref.
Locarno Film Festival	16 August 2025	Golden Leopard	Donkey Days	Nominated	
