= Moritz Jahn (actor) =

German actor and musician (born 1995)

- Born: Moritz Glaser; 17 April 1995 (age 30); Hamburg, Germany
- Occupations: Actor; musician
- Years active: 2007–present
- Known for: Die Pfefferkörner; Dark
- Musical career
- Genres: Pop rock
- Instrument(s): Vocals, guitar
- Years active: 2018–present
- Labels: Frische Luft Music
- Member of: Moritz Jahn & Frische Luft

Moritz Jahn (born Moritz Glaser, 17 April 1995) is a German actor and musician. He is best known to international audiences for his role in the Netflix show Dark.

== Career ==
=== Acting ===
Moritz Jahn became known as "Karol" in the children's show Die Pfefferkörner, in which he was the main actor from 2007 to 2009. His first lead role came in 2010 in the two-part ZDF television movie Prinz and Bottel. Jahn played the double role of Calvin and Kevin. In 2011, Jahn starred in Der Himmel hat vier Ecken, in which he played his first theatrical role. He was nominated for the Max-Ophüls Prize for his performance in 2016's Offline: Are You Ready for the Next Level?. In 2017, he was seen in Bettys Diagnose in a supporting role, playing a 17-year-old with health problems. The same year, he appeared in the mystery series Dark as Magnus Nielsen, the rebellious son of Ulrich Nielsen (played by Oliver Masucci).

In 2019, Jahn sat on the jury of the Bundesfestival Junger Film youth festival in Sankt Ingbert alongside director Andreas Dresen and actress Lucie Hollmann.

=== Music ===
Jahn has been performing as a musician since 2018. His band, known as Moritz Jahn & Frische Luft, consists of Moritz on vocals and guitar, Robert Koehler (bass, accordion, and vocals), Sebastian Scheipers (guitar, vocals), Jannis Heron (drums), and Henning von Hertel (guitar, mandolin). They released their debut EP, Love, Hate & the Mistakes of a Lifetime, in 2019. This was followed by another EP, Rascals, in 2020. Their recent singles include "Emerald Beauty", which was released in December 2020. More recent releases include "More Than You Can Chew" (26 November 2021), "Kanoa" (5 December 2021), and "Hamborger Veermaster" (22 December 2021). Moritz Jahn and Frische Luft released their debut album, Soliloquy, on 1 April 2022.

== Filmography ==
TV
Year	Title	Role	Notes
2007–2008	Die Pfefferkörner	Karol Adamek	
2016	Morgen hör ich auf	Vincent Lehmann	
2017	Bettys Diagnose	Florian	1 episode
2017	Tatort	Jonas Holdt	1 episode
2017–2020	Dark	Magnus Nielsen	
2020	Tatort	Lennart Billstein	1 episode
2022	SAS: Rogue Heroes	Corporal Herbert Brückner	

Film
Year	Title	Role	Notes
2010	Prinz und Bottel		TV movie
2011	Der Himmel hat vier Ecken		
2011	Inga Lindström – Die Hochzeit meines Mannes		TV movie
2013	Stiller Abschied		TV movie
2014	Die Schneekönigin	Prince	
2016	Offline: Are You Ready for the Next Level?	Jan	
2017	Boarding-School Intrigue	Paul	
2018	Kommissarin Heller: Vorsehung	Bastian Krämer	
2019	Get Lucky – Sex verändert alles	Mats	

== Discography ==
Albums

- Soliloquy (2022)

EPs

- Love, Hate & the Mistakes of a Lifetime (2019)
- Rascals (2020)

Singles

- "Ghost" (2020)
- "Back to the Roots" (2019)
- "Love, Hate & the Mistakes of a Lifetime" (2019)
- "Part of the World" (2019)
- "Time" (2019)
- "Goliath – Live Session" (2019)
- "Emerald Beauty" (2020)
