= Andreas Pietschmann =

German actor (born 1969)

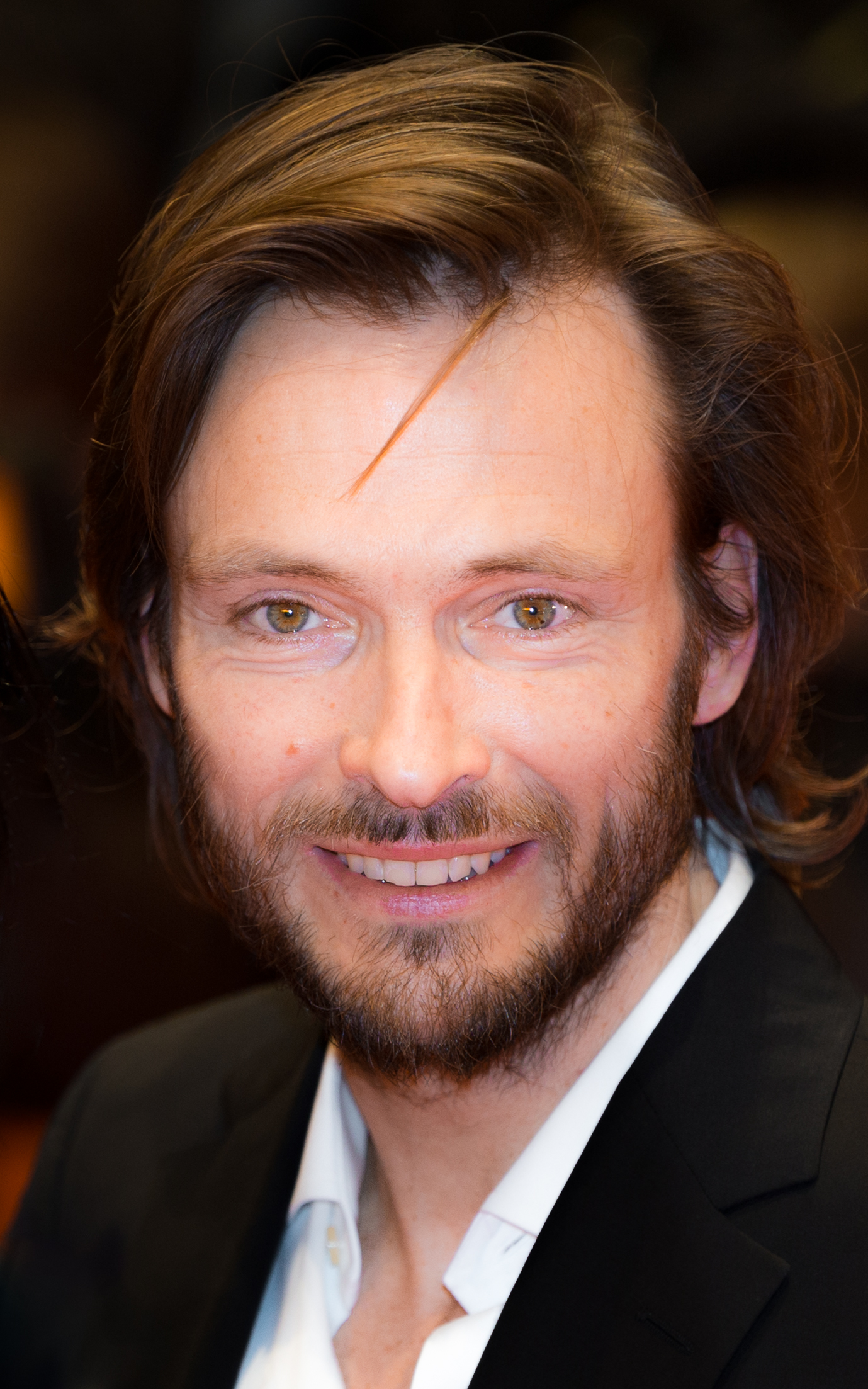
- Pietschmann in 2017
- Born: Würzburg, West Germany
- Occupation: Actor
- Years active: 1996–present

Andreas Pietschmann is a German stage, film, and television actor. He is known for playing Rudolf Hess in the 2025 film Nuremberg and for starring in two TV series released on Netflix: the science fiction drama Dark (2017–2020) and the 2026 spy drama series Unfamiliar.

== Career ==
Pietschmann attended drama school in the city of Bochum from 1993 to 1996, followed by a four-year engagement at the Schauspielhaus Bochum drama theater. He then transferred to the Thalia Theater in Hamburg for the 2000/2001 season, and he left in 2007 to focus on film and television.

Pietschmann gained fame due to his role in the 2007 television series GSG 9 – Ihr Einsatz ist ihr Leben. From 2017 to 2020, he had a starring role in the Netflix series Dark. He plays a leading role in the 2026 Netflix spy drama series Unfamiliar.

== Personal life ==
As of 2007, Pietschmann was living in Berlin with his partner, the actress Jasmin Tabatabai. He has two children with her.

== Selected filmography ==
=== Film ===
List of film appearances, with year, title, and role shown
Year	Title	Role	Notes
1996	Regular Guys	Marco	
1999	Sonnenallee	Sheikh of Berlin	
2009	Altiplano	Paul	
2012	Mary of Nazareth	Jesus	TV movie
2013	Belle and Sebastian	Lieutenant Peter Braun	
2014	Beloved Sisters	Friedrich von Beulwitz	
2025	Nuremberg	Rudolf Hess	
2027	The Last Druid †	TBA	Post-production
TBA	Play Dead †	TBA	Post-production

Key
†	Denotes films that have not yet been released

=== Television ===
List of television appearances, with year, title, and role shown
Year	Title	Role	Notes
2000	Anke		1 episode
2001	SK Kölsch		1 episode
2003	Die Pfefferkörner		1 episode
2004	Edel & Starck		1 episode
2005	Adelheid und ihre Mörder		1 episode
2005–2007	Vier gegen Z	Matreus	41 episodes
2007	Rosa Roth		1 episode
2007–2008	GSG 9 – Ihr Einsatz ist ihr Leben	Konny von Brendorp	16 episodes
2010	Großstadtrevier		1 episode
2010	Löwenzahn		1 episode
2011	Der letzte Bulle		1 episode
2011	Ein Fall für zwei		1 episode
2011–2014	Polizeiruf 110		5 episodes
2012	Der Kriminalist		1 episode
2013, 2016	SOKO München		2 episodes
2015	The Team	Elias Müller	8 episodes
2016	Cologne P.D.		1 episode
2016	Die Chefin		1 episode
2017–2020	Dark	The Stranger / Jonas Kahnwald	15 episodes
2022	1899	Eyk Larsen	8 episodes
2026	Unfamiliar	Jonas Auken	6 episodes

== Audiobooks ==
- 2010: Alicia Bessette: Weiß der Himmel von Dir (together with Jessica Schwarz), publisher: der Hörverlag, ISBN 978-3-8445-0283-1
- 2014: Frauke Scheunemann: Hochzeitsküsse, publisher: der Hörverlag, ISBN 978-3-8445-1564-0
- 2017: Gil Ribeiro: Lost in Fuseta, publisher: Argon Hörbuch, ISBN 978-3-462-05162-9
- 2020: Gil Ribeiro: Schwarzer August: Lost in Fuseta. Ein Portugal-Krimi, publisher: Argon Verlag, ISBN 978-3-7324-1788-9
- 2020: Michael Ende: Jim Knopf und Lukas der Lokomotivführer - Kinderoper, publisher: Hörbuch Hamburg, ISBN 978-3-7456-0140-4
