= Gina Alice Stiebitz =

German actress (born 1997)

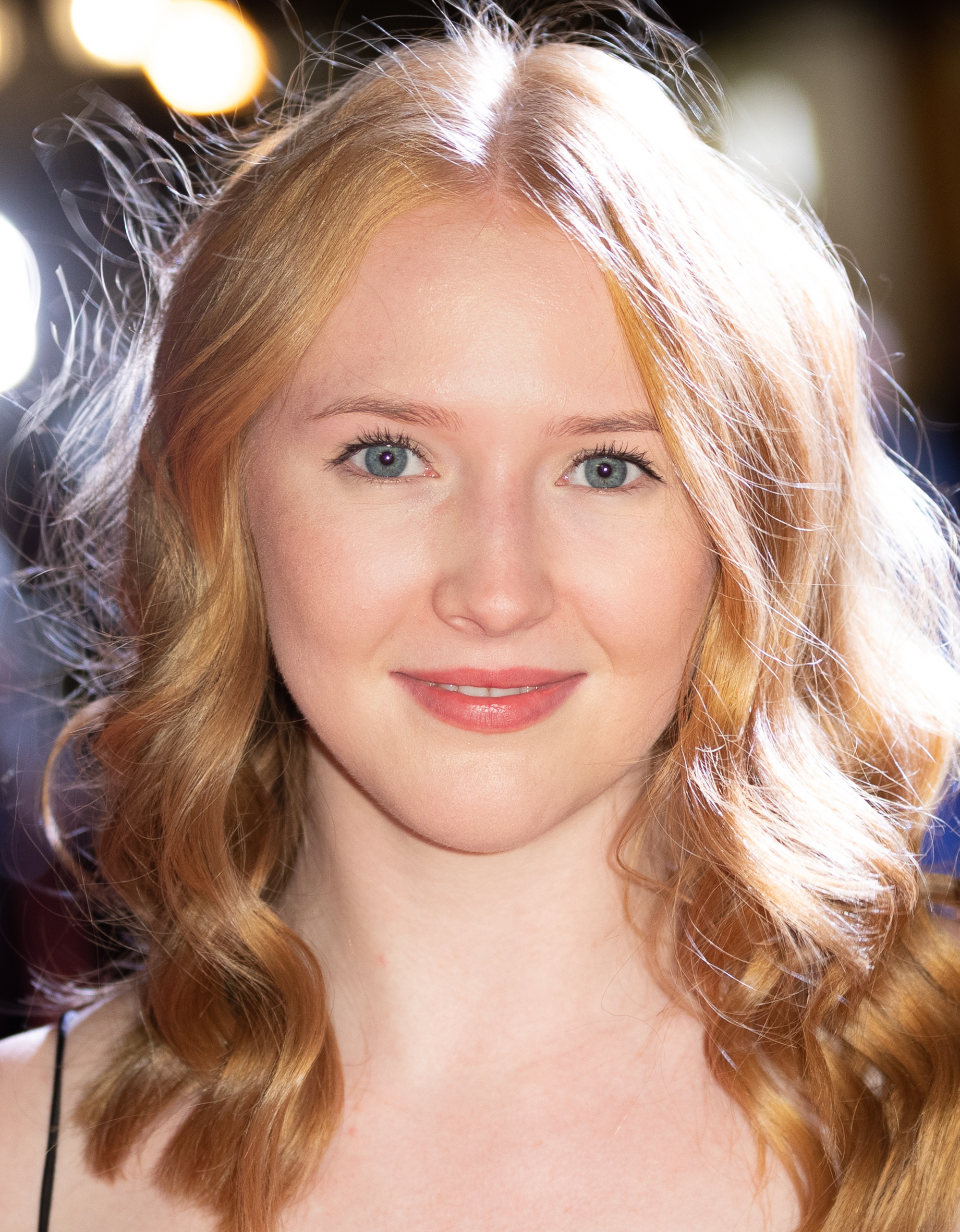
- Stiebitz in 2019
- Born: 17 October 1997 (age 28); Berlin, Germany
- Occupation: Actress
- Years active: 2010–present
- Known for: Dark

Gina Alice Stiebitz (born 17 October 1997) is a German actress. She is best known for portraying Franziska Doppler in the Netflix show Dark. She has also appeared in a number of stage productions, primarily at the Friedrichstadt-Palast theatre in Berlin.

== Biography ==
Stiebitz began her acting career in 2010 with a part in the Benedek Fliegauf movie Womb and in the television series Wie erziehe ich meine Eltern? A year later, she played Juliane Noak in the series In aller Freundschaft. In 2016, Stiebitz appeared in the television shows Familie Dr. Kleist and Großstadtrevier. She achieved international recognition in 2017 for her portrayal of Franziska Doppler, a young rebel who has a strained relationship with her parents and wants to escape from the town where she lives, in the Netflix series Dark. She reprised the role in the second and third seasons of Dark.

== Filmography ==
=== Film ===
List of film appearances, with year, title, and role shown
Year	Title	Role	Notes
2010–2011	Wie erziehe ich meine Eltern?	Konstanze "Konny" Mittenzwey	
2011	In aller Freundschaft	Juliane Noak	
2016	Familie Dr. Kleist		
2016	Alles Klara		
2017	Großstadtrevier		
2017	In aller Freundschaft – Die jungen Ärzte	Juliane Noak	
2018	Neben der Spur	Leonie Mommsen	
2019	Wir sind jetzt	Julia	
2019	The Old Fox		

=== Television ===
List of television appearances, with year, title, and role shown
Year	Title	Role	Notes
2011	Womb	Dima	
2014	Unexpected	Lilly	TV movie
2017	Wir schaffen das schon		
2017	Ich Ich Ich		
2017–2020	Dark	Franziska Doppler	
2021	The Mire	Elza Koepke	Season 2
