= Westfälisches Landestheater =

Theatre in North Rhine-Westphalia, Germany

Coordinates: 51°33′53″N 7°18′46.5″E

Westfälisches Landestheater (WLT) is a theatre in Castrop-Rauxel, North Rhine-Westphalia, Germany. There are four theaters in Nordrhein-Westfalen: the Westfälische Landestheater, the Landestheater Detmold, the Landestheater Burghofbühne in Dinslaken, and the Rheinische Landestheater in Neuss.

All of the WLT's premieres happen in the city Castrop-Rauxel. During the 2017-18 show season, there were over 360 shows and about 85,000 audience members. Each show season, the WLT premieres up to 15 shows. It is located in the Europaplatz in Castrop-Rauxel.
