= List of feature films with bisexual characters =

Symbol for bisexuality

The following is a list of feature films with fictional and factual bisexual characters. The films were released theatrically, direct-to-video, or on a streaming platform (OTT network).

Films are in alphabetical order by year of release. Titles beginning with determiners "A", "An", and "The" are alphabetized by the first significant word.

== 20th century ==
=== 1900–1959 ===
Year	Title	Character(s)	Actor	Notes	Country	Ref(s)
1916	The Wings	Mikaël	Lars Hanson	Love triangle drama between a countess, a gay sculptor, and his bisexual model and lover.	Sweden	
1924	Michael	Michael	Walter Slezak	Michael falls in love with a painter named Claude. He later leaves Claude for a woman.	Germany	
1928	Sex in Chains	Franz Sommer	William Dieterle	Franz Sommer is married to Helene, but after he is imprisoned he begins an affair with another inmate.	Germany	

=== 1960–1969 ===
Year	Title	Character(s)	Actor	Notes	Country	Ref(s)
1965	My Hustler	Paul	Paul America	Paul is a young male hustler.	United States	
1968	Lonesome Cowboys	Little Joe	Joe Dallesandro	The film is directed by gay artist Andy Warhol.	United States	
1968	Lonesome Cowboys	Eric	Eric Emerson	The film is directed by gay artist Andy Warhol.	United States	
1968	Teorema	The Visitor	Terence Stamp	This film, a parable, uses bisexuality as a symbol, with a beautiful man, unnamed and referred to as the "Visitor," appearing in the lives of a typical bourgeois Italian family, making love to the father (Paolo), the mother (Lucia), the son (Pietro), the daughter (Odetta), and the maid (Emilia). After a telegram arrives and the Visitor has to leave, all the family members change, having to confront what was previously concealed by the trappings of bourgeois life.	Italy	
1969	Midnight Cowboy	Joe Buck	Jon Voight	Joe is a gigolo who has sex with men and women in an attempt to make money. The film is based on the 1965 novel of the same name. The character was later parodied in the "Brannigan, Begin Again" episode of Futurama, which also used the film's theme, "Everybody's Talkin'" by Harry Nilsson.	United States	
1969	Women in Love	Rupert Birkin	Alan Bates	Birkin is Gerald's best friend.	United Kingdom	

=== 1970–1979 ===
List
Year	Title	Character(s)	Actor	Notes	Country	Ref(s)
1970	Bloody Mama	Fred	Robert Walden	Fred is one of the sons of 'Ma' Barker.	United States	
1970	Where's Poppa?	Sidney Hocheiser	Ron Leibman	Sidney is Gordon's brother.	United States	
1971	Doctors' Wives	Della Randolph	Rachel Roberts	Della has an affair with a woman while married to a doctor.	United States	
1971	Sunday Bloody Sunday	Bob Elkin	Murray Head	Daniel and a divorced woman Alex are both involved in an open love triangle with sculptor Bob Elkin.	United Kingdom	
1972	Cabaret	Baron Maximilian Von Heune	Helmut Griem	Maximilian is a wealthy playboy who befriends Sally and takes her and Brian to his country estate where he courts both of them. Based on the musical Cabaret.	United States	
1972	Cabaret	Brian Roberts	Michael York	Maximilian is a wealthy playboy who befriends Sally and takes her and Brian to his country estate where he courts both of them. Based on the musical Cabaret.	United States	
1972	Zee and Co.	Zee Blakeley	Elizabeth Taylor	Zee and Robert have an open marriage and they both end up sleeping with Stella.	United Kingdom	
1972	Zee and Co.	Stella	Susannah York	Zee and Robert have an open marriage and they both end up sleeping with Stella.	United Kingdom	
1974	Lenny	Honey Bruce	Valerie Perrine	Honey is married to Lenny Bruce.	United States	
1974	Score	Eddie	Casey Donovan	The story involves a happily married bisexual swinging couple who make a bet that they can seduce a couple of naive young newlyweds during a weekend get-together at their luxury Riviera villa. This was based on the on 1971 off-Broadway stage play of the same name.	United States	
1974	Score	Betsy	Lynn Lowry	The story involves a happily married bisexual swinging couple who make a bet that they can seduce a couple of naive young newlyweds during a weekend get-together at their luxury Riviera villa. This was based on the on 1971 off-Broadway stage play of the same name.	United States	
1975	Dog Day Afternoon	Sonny Wortzik	Al Pacino	Leon is Sonny's partner. Sonny is a first-time crook who tries rob a bank to pay for Leon's sex reassignment surgery, but his plan goes awry. It is also mentioned that Sonny has children with his estranged wife, Angie (this led critic Tim Robey to call Sonny a "bisexual desperado").	United States	
1975	The Rocky Horror Picture Show	Brad Majors	Barry Bostwick	Brad cheats on his fiancée, Janet Weiss, with an alien transvestite man named Dr. Frank N Furter.	United Kingdom, United States	
1975	The Rocky Horror Picture Show	Rocky	Peter Hinwood	Brad cheats on his fiancée, Janet Weiss, with an alien transvestite man named Dr. Frank N Furter.	United Kingdom, United States	
1975	Saturday Night at the Baths	Michael	Robert Aberdeen	Michael is a piano player at a bathhouse and falls in love with the manager, Scotti.	United States	
1976	Fellini's Casanova	Giacomo Casanova	Donald Sutherland	Casanova is 18th-century Venetian adventurer and writer.	Italy	
1977	Desperate Living	Peggy Gravel	Mink Stole	Gravel is Neurotic and delusional suburban housewife.	United States	
1977	Valentino	Rudolph Valentino	Rudolf Nureyev	The film is loosely based on the life of silent film actor Rudolph Valentino.	United States	
1978	Midnight Express	Billy	Brad Davis	Billy is a young American student, who is sent to a Turkish prison for trying to smuggle hashish out of the country.	United States	
1979	Manhattan	Jill Davis	Meryl Streep	Jill is Isaac's ex-wife who left him for Connie.	United States	
1979	The Rose	Mary Rose "The Rose" Foster	Bette Midler	Sarah is a former lover of Mary's.	United States	
1979	The Tempest	Prospero	Heathcote Williams	Prospero is a magician.	United Kingdom	
1979	The Tempest	Stephano	Christopher Biggins	Prospero is a magician.	United Kingdom	

=== 1980–1989 ===
List
Year	Title	Character(s)	Actor	Notes	Country	Ref(s)
1980	Richard's Things	Kate Morris	Liv Ullmann	After the death of Richard, Kate discovers that he had been having an affair with Josie. They meet and eventually fall in love.	United Kingdom	
1980	Richard's Things	Josie	Amanda Redman	After the death of Richard, Kate discovers that he had been having an affair with Josie. They meet and eventually fall in love.	United Kingdom	
1981	Chanel Solitaire	Coco Chanel	Marie-France Pisier	Chanel was a French fashion designer and businesswoman.	United States, United Kingdom, France	
1982	48 Hrs.	Sally	Denise Crosby	Sally sleeps with Billy and Ganz, and is also implied to be sleeping with Casey, a fellow woman.	United States	
1982	Querelle	Georges Querelle	Brad Davis	George is a thief and murderer who frequents a bar and brothel for sailors run by Madame Lysiane, who is in love with his brother. He becomes Lysiane's lover after he wins a game of dice against her husband. He also has sex with Mario and lets himself be sodomized by Lysiane's husband.	France, West Germany	
1982	Victor/Victoria	Richard DiNardo	Malcolm Jamieson	Richard is a hustler with whom Toddy is romantically involved.	United Kingdom, United States	
1983	The Fourth Man	Gerard Revé	Jeroen Krabbé	Gerard Revé is an alcoholic novelist.	Netherlands	
1983	The Hunger	Miriam Blaylock	Catherine Deneuve	The film concerns a love triangle between a doctor who specializes in sleep and aging research (Sarandon) and a vampire couple (Deneuve and Bowie).	United States, United Kingdom	
1983	The Hunger	Sarah Roberts	Susan Sarandon	The film concerns a love triangle between a doctor who specializes in sleep and aging research (Sarandon) and a vampire couple (Deneuve and Bowie).	United States, United Kingdom	
1983	The Lonely Lady	Jerilee Randall	Pia Zadora	Jerilee Randall is a high school student, living in the San Fernando Valley, dreams of becoming a famous writer.	United States	
1985	The Color Purple	Celie Harris-Johnson	Whoopi Goldberg	Avery is a showgirl and Mister's long-time mistress who's in love with Celie.	United States	
1985	The Color Purple	Shug Avery	Margaret Avery	Avery is a showgirl and Mister's long-time mistress who's in love with Celie.	United States	
1986	Blue Velvet	Frank Booth	Dennis Hopper	Booth is an aggressively psychopathic gangster and drug lord.	United States	
1986	Tenue de soirée	Bob	Gérard Depardieu	Bob is an ebullient ex-convict.	France	
1987	Beyond Therapy	Bruce	Jeff Goldblum	Bruce has a male live-in lover and female spouse.	United States	
1987	Less than Zero	Julian Wells	Robert Downey Jr.	Wells is Clay's high school best friend.	United States	
1988	Torch Song Trilogy	Ed	Brian Kerwin	Ed is a schoolteacher.	United States	
1988	We Think the World of You	Johnny	Gary Oldman	Johnny is an aimless young married man living in post-war London.	United Kingdom	
1989	The Rainbow	Ursula Brangwen	Sammi Davis	Ursula is the eldest child of a wealthy Derbyshire farmer.	United Kingdom, United States	
1989	The Rainbow	Winifred Inger	Amanda Donohoe	Ursula is the eldest child of a wealthy Derbyshire farmer.	United Kingdom, United States	

=== 1990–1999 ===
List
Year	Title	Character(s)	Actor	Notes	Country	Ref(s)
1990	Henry & June	June Miller	Uma Thurman	Henry's wife June has an affair with Anaïs Nin.	United States	
1991	Fried Green Tomatoes	Ruth Jamison	Mary-Louise Parker	Idgie has always loved Ruth. Ruth had a previous relationship with Buddy Threadgoode, Idgie's brother, before she married and had a child with another man. After Idgie rescues Ruth from her abusive husband, the romantic relationship between the two women begins. Based on the novel Fried Green Tomatoes at the Whistle Stop Cafe, where the relationship between Idgie and Ruth is not explicitly identified as a lesbian relationship, but every resident knows about them and accepts their relationship.	United States	
1991	JFK	David Ferrie	Joe Pesci	Ferrie was depicted as a drug-addicted, paranoid bisexual who allegedly had ties to Lee Harvey Oswald in the movie.	United States	
1991	Madonna: Truth or Dare	Herself	Sandra Bernhard	Bernhard is an actress.	United States	
1992	Basic Instinct	Catherine Tramell	Sharon Stone	(Critics noted that Catherine had been straightwashed in the 2006 sequel, Basic Instinct 2.)	France, United States, United Kingdom	
1992	Basic Instinct	Dr. Beth Garner	Jeanne Tripplehorn	(Critics noted that Catherine had been straightwashed in the 2006 sequel, Basic Instinct 2.)	France, United States, United Kingdom	
1993	Fight Back to School III	Judy Tong Wong	Anita Mui	Judy is the dead man's wife. She has a girlfriend on the side, Ching Man Ching.	Hong Kong	
1993	Six Degrees of Separation	Rick	Eric Thal	Rick has a live-in girlfriend named Elizabeth, and has sex with Paul.	United States	
1993	Three of Hearts	Ellen Armstrong	Sherilyn Fenn	Armstrong is Connie's former lover.	United States	
1994	Interview with the Vampire	Louis de Pointe du Lac	Brad Pitt	Pointe du Lac and Lioncourt are vampires.	United States	
1994	Interview with the Vampire	Lestat de Lioncourt	Tom Cruise	Pointe du Lac and Lioncourt are vampires.	United States	
1995	Bugis Street	Meng	Michael Lam	Lola is one of the prostitutes inhabiting the Sin Sin Hotel on Bugis Street. Meng, the boyfriend of Lola, seduces Lin (a young female chambermaid and desk clerk at the hotel).	British Hong Kong	
1995	Bugis Street	Meng	Michael Lam	Lola is one of the prostitutes inhabiting the Sin Sin Hotel on Bugis Street. Meng, the boyfriend of Lola, seduces Lin (a young female chambermaid and desk clerk at the hotel).	Singapore	
1995	Carrington	Roger Senhouse	Sebastian Harcombe	Roger becomes Lytton's sadomasochistic lover. Lytton was a founding member of the Bloomsbury Group. His homosexuality, as depicted in the film, was well known.	France	
1995	Carrington	Roger Senhouse	Sebastian Harcombe	Roger becomes Lytton's sadomasochistic lover. Lytton was a founding member of the Bloomsbury Group. His homosexuality, as depicted in the film, was well known.	United Kingdom	
1995	The Doom Generation	Xavier "X" Red	Johnathon Schaech	Xavier, a handsome drifter, is picked-up by teen lovers Jordan and Amy on their way back from a club. After Xavier accidentally kills a store owner, he has sex with Amy, while Jordan becomes sexually attracted to him as well.	United States	
1995	The Doom Generation	Jordan White	James Duval	Xavier, a handsome drifter, is picked-up by teen lovers Jordan and Amy on their way back from a club. After Xavier accidentally kills a store owner, he has sex with Amy, while Jordan becomes sexually attracted to him as well.	United States	
1995	Showgirls	Cristal Connors	Gina Gershon	Cristal, who has a boyfriend, wants a relationship with Nomi so she can destroy her. (One reviewer wrote that bisexuality is "a weapon, a plot device and an arena for titillating spectacle" like in Basic Instinct.)	France	
1995	Showgirls	Nomi Malone	Elizabeth Berkley	Cristal, who has a boyfriend, wants a relationship with Nomi so she can destroy her. (One reviewer wrote that bisexuality is "a weapon, a plot device and an arena for titillating spectacle" like in Basic Instinct.)	United States	
1995	Total Eclipse	Paul Verlaine	David Thewlis	The film presents a historical account of the passionate and violent relationship between 19th-century French poets Arthur Rimbaud and Paul Verlaine, at a time of soaring creativity for both men.	United Kingdom	
1995	Total Eclipse	Paul Verlaine	David Thewlis	The film presents a historical account of the passionate and violent relationship between 19th-century French poets Arthur Rimbaud and Paul Verlaine, at a time of soaring creativity for both men.	France	
1995	Total Eclipse	Paul Verlaine	David Thewlis	The film presents a historical account of the passionate and violent relationship between 19th-century French poets Arthur Rimbaud and Paul Verlaine, at a time of soaring creativity for both men.	Belgium	
1995	Total Eclipse	Paul Verlaine	David Thewlis	The film presents a historical account of the passionate and violent relationship between 19th-century French poets Arthur Rimbaud and Paul Verlaine, at a time of soaring creativity for both men.	Italy	
1995	Total Eclipse	Paul Verlaine	David Thewlis	The film presents a historical account of the passionate and violent relationship between 19th-century French poets Arthur Rimbaud and Paul Verlaine, at a time of soaring creativity for both men.	United States	
1995	Wild Side	Virginia	Joan Chen	Virginia is Bruno's wife.	United Kingdom, United States	
1996	Bound	Violet	Jennifer Tilly	Violet, who longs to escape her relationship with her mafioso boyfriend Caesar, enters into a clandestine affair with alluring ex-con Corky, and the two women hatch a scheme to steal $2 million of Mafia money.	United States	
1996	Female Perversions	Eve Stephens	Tilda Swinton	Stephens is a Los Angeles trial attorney.	United States, Germany	
1996	Mongkok Story	Lui Lone	Anthony Wong	Lone forces Leung to perform oral sex on him as penance.	Hong Kong	
1996	The Pillow Book	Jerome	Ewan McGregor	Jerome is a British translator.	Netherlands, United Kingdom, France, Luxembourg	
1997	L.A. Confidential	Matt Reynolds	Simon Baker Denny	Matt Reynolds is a struggling actor.	United States	
1997	Midnight in the Garden of Good and Evil	Billy Hansford	Jude Law	Billy is an American shooting victim who was killed by his employer.	United States	
1997	Nowhere	Mel	Rachel True	Dark and Mel are a couple in an open relationship.	United States	
1997	Nowhere	Dark	James Duval	Dark and Mel are a couple in an open relationship.	United States	
1998	Bedrooms and Hallways	Leo	Kevin McKidd	Throughout the movie, it's revealed that Leo has a complicated personal history with some of the guests and hides in his bedroom	United Kingdom	
1998	Dark Harbor	David Weinberg	Alan Rickman	David and the young man are lovers.	United States	
1998	High Art	Sydney "Syd"	Radha Mitchell	Syd, living with longtime boyfriend James, has desires and frustrations that seem typical and manageable but new events unfold, with Lucy Berliner opening the door to an uncharted world for Syd. Lucy, who lives with her heroin-addicted German girlfriend Greta, and becomes closer to Syd as the film moves forward.	United States	
1998	Hold You Tight	Fung Wai	Sunny Chan	The story of a man living in Hong Kong who is initially drawn to a young woman, but soon finds he is more attracted to her boyfriend.	Hong Kong	
1998	Velvet Goldmine	Brian Slade	Jonathan Rhys Meyers	At the beginning of his career, Slade is married to Mandy. But when he comes to the United States, he seeks out American rock star Curt Wild, and they become involved in each other's lives on a personal and creative level.	United Kingdom, United States	
1998	Velvet Goldmine	Arthur Stuart	Christian Bale	At the beginning of his career, Slade is married to Mandy. But when he comes to the United States, he seeks out American rock star Curt Wild, and they become involved in each other's lives on a personal and creative level.	United Kingdom, United States	
1998	Velvet Goldmine	Curt Wild	Ewan McGregor	At the beginning of his career, Slade is married to Mandy. But when he comes to the United States, he seeks out American rock star Curt Wild, and they become involved in each other's lives on a personal and creative level.	United Kingdom, United States	
1998	Velvet Goldmine	Mandy Slade	Toni Collette	At the beginning of his career, Slade is married to Mandy. But when he comes to the United States, he seeks out American rock star Curt Wild, and they become involved in each other's lives on a personal and creative level.	United Kingdom, United States	
1998	Wild Things	Suzie Toller	Neve Campbell	Toller is an outcast classmate of Kelly, who comes from a poor family in the Everglades and makes accusation that her high school guidance counselor rapes her.	United States	
1999	Being John Malkovich	Maxine Lund	Catherine Keener	At first Maxine is specifically attracted to Lotte in John's body, and becomes pregnant when she and Lotte (in John's body) have sex.	United States	
1999	Girl, Interrupted	Lisa Rowe	Angelina Jolie	Lisa share a kiss with Susanna while high on drugs.	United States	
1999	The Haunting	Theodora	Catherine Zeta-Jones	Theodora mentions having both a boyfriend and a girlfriend.	United States	
1999	Summer of Sam	Ritchie	Adrien Brody	Ritchie is volatile. He is Vinny's childhood friend who has embraced punk fashion and music, and begins a relationship with Ruby.	United States	
1999	The Talented Mr. Ripley	Tom Ripley	Matt Damon	Ripley is a career criminal, con artist, and serial killer.	United States	

== 21st century ==
=== 2000–2004 ===
List
Year	Title	Character(s)	Actor	Notes	Country	Ref(s)
2000	Beat	William S. Burroughs	Kiefer Sutherland	To his wife's chagrin, William carries on an affair with a male lover.	United States	
2000	Before Night Falls	Pepe Malas	Andrea Di Stefano	Pepe is in a relationship with Reinaldo before leaving him to pursue a woman.	United States	
2000	Confusion of Genders	Alain Bauman	Pascal Greggory	Alain is a 40-year-old lawyer who has many one-night stands with women and falls in love with his male client.	France	
2000	Wonder Boys	Terry "Crabs" Crabtree	Robert Downey Jr.	Crabs is Grady's editor.	United States	
2000	Wonder Boys	Terry "Crabs" Crabtree	Robert Downey Jr.	Crabs is Grady's editor.	United Kingdom	
2000	Wonder Boys	Terry "Crabs" Crabtree	Robert Downey Jr.	Crabs is Grady's editor.	Germany	
2000	Wonder Boys	Terry "Crabs" Crabtree	Robert Downey Jr.	Crabs is Grady's editor.	Japan	
2001	Blow Dry	Shelley Allen	Natasha Richardson	Shelley Allen operates a hairdressing shop in Keighley with her lesbian domestic partner Sandra.	United States	
2001	Blow Dry	Shelley Allen	Natasha Richardson	Shelley Allen operates a hairdressing shop in Keighley with her lesbian domestic partner Sandra.	United Kingdom	
2001	Blow Dry	Shelley Allen	Natasha Richardson	Shelley Allen operates a hairdressing shop in Keighley with her lesbian domestic partner Sandra.	Germany	
2001	Bungee Jumping of Their Own	Seo In-woo	Lee Byung-hun	Seo falls passionately in love with Tae-hee within moments of first meeting her. They begin dating but she is suddenly killed in a car crash. Almost 20 years later he is a high school teacher, married and with a daughter. One day he spots a male student, Im Hyun-bin, who looks almost identical to Tae-hee. He falls in love with Im, even though he feels uncomfortable doing so, and they are soon bullied and taunted by the school's students. Seo realises that Im is the reincarnation of Tae-hee.	South Korea	
2001	Ichi the Killer	Kakihara	Tadanobu Asano	Kakihara is a sadomasochist with an unnatural passion. He prefers mostly males over females for engaging in S&M. He inflicts pain on himself for pleasure and has no interest in sexuality, but is willing to become lovers with anyone who satisfies his pleasure. (Based on Hideo Yamamoto's manga of the same name.)	Japan	
2001	The Ignorant Fairies	Massimo	Andrea Renzi	Massimo was the husband of Antonia while having an affair with the homosexual man Michele.	Italy	
2001	Iris	Iris Murdoch	Judi Dench (adult Iris); Kate Winslet (young Iris)	Iris has love affairs with men and women.	United Kingdom, United States	
2001	Julie Johnson	Julie Johnson	Lili Taylor	Julie is a housewife who leaves her abusive husband and meets Claire. They live together and begin a romantic relationship.	United States	
2001	Julie Johnson	Claire	Courtney Love	Julie is a housewife who leaves her abusive husband and meets Claire. They live together and begin a romantic relationship.	United States	
2001	Kissing Jessica Stein	Helen Cooper	Heather Juergensen	Cooper works at an art gallery.	United States	
2001	Mulholland Drive	Camilla Rhodes	Laura Harring	Rhodes is a "bisexual vixen" and a driving force of the film.	United States	
2001	Piñero	Miguel Piñero	Benjamin Bratt	In the film, Piñero's love life is displayed, ranging from his interactions with men and women.	United States	
2001	The Royal Tenenbaums	Margot Tennenbaum	Gwyneth Paltrow	The film follows three siblings who were talented when they were children but "grow up into disappointments." Margot, who had a previous relationship with a woman, is married to Raleigh St. Clair, a neurologist.	United States	
2001	Shake It All About	Jacob	Mads Mikkelsen	Jacob asks Jørgen to marry him, and he happily accepts. However, Jacob falls in love with another woman.	Denmark	
2001	Y tu mamá también	Tenoch Iturbide	Diego Luna	Iturbide and Zapata are "two teenage best friends".	Mexico	
2001	Y tu mamá también	Julio Zapata	Gael García Bernal	Iturbide and Zapata are "two teenage best friends".	Mexico	
2002	The Hours	Clarissa Vaughan	Meryl Streep	Clarissa is in a long-term relationship with her lesbian partner Sally, which is seemingly threatened when she pines for "a long-lost romance with Richard."	United Kingdom	
2002	The Hours	Virginia Woolf	Nicole Kidman	Clarissa is in a long-term relationship with her lesbian partner Sally, which is seemingly threatened when she pines for "a long-lost romance with Richard."	United States	
2002	May	May Dove Canady	Angela Bettis	May is a veterinary assistant.	United States	
2002	The Rules of Attraction	Paul Denton	Ian Somerhalder	Paul is the boyfriend of Laura and he's attracted to Sean. He tries to go out with him, but fails.	Germany	
2002	The Rules of Attraction	Paul Denton	Ian Somerhalder	Paul is the boyfriend of Laura and he's attracted to Sean. He tries to go out with him, but fails.	United States	
2003	Party Monster	Keoki	Wilmer Valderrama	Keoki is an electronic musician and DJ.	United States	
2003	SpiderBabe	Patricia Porker	Erin Brown	Patricia is bitten by a spider, develops superhuman powers, and nymphomaniac urges. She has sex with several males and females.	United States	
2004	The 24th Day	Tom	Scott Speedman	Tom has been diagnosed with HIV and believes he infected his late wife with the AIDS virus. He had only one sexual encounter with a man, Dan, and thinks that it was he who transmitted the disease to him. Tom kidnaps Dan with the intent to kill him.	United States	
2004	Alexander	Alexander	Colin Farrell	Alexander has relationships with childhood friends Hephaistion and Bagoas; and later with his wife Roxana. Alexander has an ambiguous sexuality, with director Oliver Stone saying Alexander had "a polymorphous sensuality and was an explorer in the deepest sense of the world."	Germany	
2004	Alexander	Alexander	Colin Farrell	Alexander has relationships with childhood friends Hephaistion and Bagoas; and later with his wife Roxana. Alexander has an ambiguous sexuality, with director Oliver Stone saying Alexander had "a polymorphous sensuality and was an explorer in the deepest sense of the world."	France	
2004	Alexander	Alexander	Colin Farrell	Alexander has relationships with childhood friends Hephaistion and Bagoas; and later with his wife Roxana. Alexander has an ambiguous sexuality, with director Oliver Stone saying Alexander had "a polymorphous sensuality and was an explorer in the deepest sense of the world."	Italy	
2004	Alexander	Alexander	Colin Farrell	Alexander has relationships with childhood friends Hephaistion and Bagoas; and later with his wife Roxana. Alexander has an ambiguous sexuality, with director Oliver Stone saying Alexander had "a polymorphous sensuality and was an explorer in the deepest sense of the world."	Netherlands	
2004	Alexander	Alexander	Colin Farrell	Alexander has relationships with childhood friends Hephaistion and Bagoas; and later with his wife Roxana. Alexander has an ambiguous sexuality, with director Oliver Stone saying Alexander had "a polymorphous sensuality and was an explorer in the deepest sense of the world."	United Kingdom	
2004	Alexander	Alexander	Colin Farrell	Alexander has relationships with childhood friends Hephaistion and Bagoas; and later with his wife Roxana. Alexander has an ambiguous sexuality, with director Oliver Stone saying Alexander had "a polymorphous sensuality and was an explorer in the deepest sense of the world."	United States	
2004	D.E.B.S	Amy Bradshaw	Sara Foster	Bradshaw dreams of attending art school despite being the academy's top recruit.	United States	
2004	De-Lovely	Cole Porter	Kevin Kline	The film is about the life and career of Cole Porter.	United States	
2004	Dodgeball: A True Underdog Story	Kate Veatch	Christine Taylor	It is not until the film is ending that Kate mentions she has a girlfriend named Joyce, who has come to watch her play (Kate has not previously been shown as being attracted to women). One teammate then says to the other: "I told you she was a lesbian", to which Kate replies "Hey! I'm not a lesbian! No. I'm bisexual." Then she kisses one of the men.	United States	
2004	Grande École	Paul	Gregori Baquet	Paul has a girlfriend but sleeps with one of his new male roommates. Mécir, a young Arab manual worker, becomes attracted to Paul.	France	
2004	Grande École	Mécir	Salim Kechiouche	Paul has a girlfriend but sleeps with one of his new male roommates. Mécir, a young Arab manual worker, becomes attracted to Paul.	France	
2004	Kinsey	Alfred Kinsey	Liam Neeson	Kinsey is a pioneer in the area of sexology, including sexual orientation.	United States	
2004	The Life Aquatic with Steve Zissou	Alistair Hennessey	Jeff Goldblum	Hennessey is Eleanor's ex-husband and Zissou's nemesis.	United States	
2004	My Summer of Love	Mona	Natalie Press	The film explores the romantic relationship between two young women from different classes and backgrounds.	United Kingdom	
2004	Stage Beauty	Ned Kynaston	Billy Crudup	Kynaston is one of the leading actors of his day, particularly famous for his portrayal of female characters. Having gone through a long and strenuous training to play female roles, he finds himself without a guise by which to keep the attention of his lover Villiers, the Duke of Buckingham	Germany	
2004	Stage Beauty	Ned Kynaston	Billy Crudup	Kynaston is one of the leading actors of his day, particularly famous for his portrayal of female characters. Having gone through a long and strenuous training to play female roles, he finds himself without a guise by which to keep the attention of his lover Villiers, the Duke of Buckingham	United Kingdom	
2004	Stage Beauty	Ned Kynaston	Billy Crudup	Kynaston is one of the leading actors of his day, particularly famous for his portrayal of female characters. Having gone through a long and strenuous training to play female roles, he finds himself without a guise by which to keep the attention of his lover Villiers, the Duke of Buckingham	United States	
2004	Star Appeal	E.T.	Guifeng Wang	E.T., a young man from the planet Mars, arrives on Earth totally naked. He befriends Xiao Bo, who removes his own clothes to make E.T. feel more comfortable, and teaches him languages, science and a range of other subjects. The two become close and eventually fall in love. E.T. later falls in love with Xiao Bo's girlfriend, and they attempt to have a baby.	China	
2004	Star Appeal	Xiao Bo	Yu Bo	E.T., a young man from the planet Mars, arrives on Earth totally naked. He befriends Xiao Bo, who removes his own clothes to make E.T. feel more comfortable, and teaches him languages, science and a range of other subjects. The two become close and eventually fall in love. E.T. later falls in love with Xiao Bo's girlfriend, and they attempt to have a baby.	China	

=== 2005–2009 ===
List
Year	Title	Character(s)	Actor	Notes	Country	Ref(s)
2005	Brokeback Mountain	Ennis Del Mar	Heath Ledger	Ennis and Jack are in love with each other, but they also have loving and sexual relations with their wives.	United States	
2005	Brokeback Mountain	Jack Twist	Jake Gyllenhaal	Ennis and Jack are in love with each other, but they also have loving and sexual relations with their wives.	United States	
2005	Cold Showers	Mickael	Johan Libéreau	Teenagers Mickael and Clément are fellow students and teammates. They engage in a ménage à trois with Vanessa, Mickael's girlfriend, resulting in the boys becoming attracted to each other.	France	
2005	Cold Showers	Clément	Pierre Perrier	Teenagers Mickael and Clément are fellow students and teammates. They engage in a ménage à trois with Vanessa, Mickael's girlfriend, resulting in the boys becoming attracted to each other.	France	
2005	The Dying Gaul	Jeffrey Tishop	Campbell Scott	Tishop is a studio executive.	United States	
2005	Imagine Me & You	Rachel	Piper Perabo	Rachel is Hector's fiancée who falls in love with flower shop owner Luce.	Germany	
2005	Imagine Me & You	Rachel	Piper Perabo	Rachel is Hector's fiancée who falls in love with flower shop owner Luce.	United Kingdom	
2005	Little Fish	Brad 'The Jockey' Thompson	Sam Neill	'The Jockey', a local gangster on the point of retirement, is the former lover of rugby star Lionel.	Australia	
2005	My Fair Son	Xiao Bo	Yu Bo	Bo is one of Ray's father's employees.	China	
2005	Rent	Maureen Johnson	Idina Menzel	Johnson is Mark's ex-girlfriend.	United States	
2005	Transamerica	Toby	Kevin Zegers	Toby is a 17-year-old jailed in New York City.	United States	
2005	Where the Truth Lies	Vince Collins	Colin Firth	Collins, Morris and Maureen had engaged in a ménage à trois fueled by drugs and alcohol. At some point Collins tried to have sex with Morris, who resisted violently.	Canada	
2005	Where the Truth Lies	Vince Collins	Colin Firth	Collins, Morris and Maureen had engaged in a ménage à trois fueled by drugs and alcohol. At some point Collins tried to have sex with Morris, who resisted violently.	United Kingdom	
2006	The Black Dahlia	Madeleine Linscott	Hilary Swank	Madeleine is a coolly elegant heiress.	United States, France, Germany	
2006	The History Boys	Stuart Dakin	Dominic Cooper	Based on the play of the same name.	United Kingdom	
2007	After Sex	Nikki	Mila Kunis	Nikki has oral sex with Kat because it feels better than when males do it.	United States	
2007	Love Songs	Ismaël Benoliel	Louis Garrel	Ismaël, Julie, and Alice are in a ménage-à-trois. After a tragedy strikes and breaks them apart, the characters learn to deal with loss and mourning. Ismaël unexpectedly finds love again with a young man named Erwann.	France	
2007	Love Songs	Julie Pommeraye	Ludivigne Sagnier	Ismaël, Julie, and Alice are in a ménage-à-trois. After a tragedy strikes and breaks them apart, the characters learn to deal with loss and mourning. Ismaël unexpectedly finds love again with a young man named Erwann.	France	
2007	Love Songs	Alice	Clotilde Hesme	Ismaël, Julie, and Alice are in a ménage-à-trois. After a tragedy strikes and breaks them apart, the characters learn to deal with loss and mourning. Ismaël unexpectedly finds love again with a young man named Erwann.	France	
2007	Planet Terror	Dakota Block	Marley Shelton	Dakota is William's anesthesiologist wife.	United States	
2007	Pleasure Factory	Jonathan	Loo Zihan	The film is set in Singapore's red-light district. Jonathan has sexual relationships with both men and women.	Hong Kong, Singapore, Thailand	
2007	Shelter	Zach	Trevor Wright	Zach is an aspiring young artist living in San Pedro, California.	United States	
2007	Steam	Niala	Reshma Shetty	Niala spends a night with her classmate Elizabeth.	United States	
2008	City Without Baseball	Ronnie	Ron Heung	In a story set in the 1990s, Ronnie, a pitcher with Hong Kong's National Baseball Team, has a steady girlfriend and appears well settled-in. But over time, he becomes increasingly attracted to one of his colleagues, and summons up the courage to kiss him in the men's changing rooms. The actors, including the protagonist, were real-life members of the National Baseball Team at the time of filming. Based on a real story, the film is the first feature produced by the award-winning Chinese LGBT filmmaker known as 'Scud'.	Hong Kong	
2008	The Mysteries of Pittsburgh	Cleveland Arning	Peter Sarsgaard	In the novel, Cleveland is entirely heterosexual, but in adapting the film, he became merged with the homosexual character Arthur Lecomte, one of the novel's key love interests.	United States	
2008	Vicky Cristina Barcelona	María Elena	Penélope Cruz	María is Juan's mentally and emotionally unstable ex-wife.	Spain	
2008	Vicky Cristina Barcelona	María Elena	Penélope Cruz	María is Juan's mentally and emotionally unstable ex-wife.	United States	
2009	Chloe	Chloe Sweeney	Amanda Seyfried	Sweeney is a call girl.	Canada, France, United States	
2009	Everybody's Fine	Rosie Goode	Drew Barrymore	Rosie hides her sexuality from her father.	United States	
2009	I Love You, Beth Cooper	Rich Munsch	Jack Carpenter	Munsch is Rich's best friend.	United States	
2009	Jennifer's Body	Jennifer Check	Megan Fox	Since childhood, Needy has been best friends with Jennifer Check, a popular and beautiful high school color guard flag spinner, despite the two having little in common. Jennifer often mistreats and dominates Needy, who is too in awe of her to stand up for herself.	United States	
2009	Jennifer's Body	Anita "Needy" Lesnicki	Amanda Seyfried	Since childhood, Needy has been best friends with Jennifer Check, a popular and beautiful high school color guard flag spinner, despite the two having little in common. Jennifer often mistreats and dominates Needy, who is too in awe of her to stand up for herself.	United States	
2009	Permanent Residence	Windson	Osman Hung	Ivan seeks a long-term relationship with a straight friend. Befriending another young man, Windson, at a public sports club, the two build up a friendly rapport. However, Windson becomes aware of his inclination, and while happy to remain his friend, is initially very reluctant to become emotionally involved with him. This is the first feature film directed by award-winning Chinese LGBT filmmaker known as 'Scud'.	Hong Kong	
2009	Undertow	Miguel	Cristian Mercado	Miguel is married to Mariela, who is pregnant with their first son, but he also has a secret affair with a male painter called Santiago.	Peru	
2009	Undertow	Miguel	Cristian Mercado	Miguel is married to Mariela, who is pregnant with their first son, but he also has a secret affair with a male painter called Santiago.	Colombia	
2009	Undertow	Miguel	Cristian Mercado	Miguel is married to Mariela, who is pregnant with their first son, but he also has a secret affair with a male painter called Santiago.	France	
2009	Undertow	Miguel	Cristian Mercado	Miguel is married to Mariela, who is pregnant with their first son, but he also has a secret affair with a male painter called Santiago.	Germany	

=== 2010–2014 ===
List
Year	Title	Character(s)	Actor	Notes	Country	Ref(s)
2010	All About Love	Anita	Vivian Chow	Anita and Macy had been lovers in the past and meet again years later in a counseling session for expectant mothers.	Hong Kong	
2010	All About Love	Macy	Sandra Ng	Anita and Macy had been lovers in the past and meet again years later in a counseling session for expectant mothers.	Hong Kong	
2010	Amphetamine	Kafka	Byron Pang	Daniel, an openly-gay wealthy Chinese-Australian investment banker working in Hong Kong meets and befriends Kafka, a young swimming instructor from a poor local family, who has strong religious beliefs. Kafka was sexually assaulted as a teenager by a male gang after successfully defending a young woman from being raped, and as a result, he has become impotent and a habitual user of recreational drugs. Although initially uncomfortable with Daniel's obvious sexual attraction to him, he soon sees Daniel as offering him new hope in life, and he falls deeply in love with him. But Kafka's life begins to fall apart again when his mother dies suddenly, and he attempts to end his life.	Hong Kong	
2010	Black Swan	Nina Sayers / White Swan / Odette	Natalie Portman	Nina is a young committed dancer.	United States	
2010	Howl	Neal Cassady	Jon Prescott	Cassady is a major figure of the Beat Generation of the 1950s.	United States	
2010	Kaboom	Hunter	Jason Olive	Smith visits a nude beach and meets a man named Hunter. They start having sex, but Smith is disappointed to hear Hunter is married.	United States	
2010	Kaboom	Rex	Andy Fischer-Price	Smith visits a nude beach and meets a man named Hunter. They start having sex, but Smith is disappointed to hear Hunter is married.	United States	
2010	Kaboom	Smith	Thomas Dekker	Smith visits a nude beach and meets a man named Hunter. They start having sex, but Smith is disappointed to hear Hunter is married.	United States	
2010	The Kids Are All Right	Jules Allgood	Julianne Moore	Jules used the same sperm donor used by her lesbian spouse Nicole to conceive a child. Their teenage son wants to find out about his biological father and his older sister helps him find the contact information, which leads to an unexpected upheaval in their marriage when Jules meets the father.	United States	
2010	Scott Pilgrim vs. the World	Ramona Flowers	Mary Elizabeth Winstead	Ramona describes her relationship with Richter as her being "bi-curious". Besides her lesbian ex-girlfriend, Ramona has six ex-boyfriends. Wallace hooked up with Stacey's boyfriend Jimmy.	United Kingdom	
2010	Scott Pilgrim vs. the World	Jimmy	Kjartan Hewitt	Ramona describes her relationship with Richter as her being "bi-curious". Besides her lesbian ex-girlfriend, Ramona has six ex-boyfriends. Wallace hooked up with Stacey's boyfriend Jimmy.	United States	
2010	Scott Pilgrim vs. the World	Jimmy	Kjartan Hewitt	Ramona describes her relationship with Richter as her being "bi-curious". Besides her lesbian ex-girlfriend, Ramona has six ex-boyfriends. Wallace hooked up with Stacey's boyfriend Jimmy.	Japan	
2011	Butter	Brooke	Olivia Wilde	Brooke is a stripper.	United States	
2011	Love Actually... Sucks!	Bridegroom	Jackie Chow	Inspired by real-life events, the film tells a series of interconnected stories, several with LGBT relationships. The opening wedding banquet reveals a sex affair between the bridegroom and a bridesman. Other stories include a married painter who falls in love with his young male life model, a dance school teacher who becomes involved with his senior student, and a role-playing lesbian couple.	Hong Kong	
2011	North Sea Texas	Gino	Mathias Vergels	Pim falls in love with his best friend, Gino.	Belgium	
2011	Our Idiot Brother	Natalie "Nat" Rochlin	Zooey Deschanel	Natalie is a hipster living with her girlfriend Cindy.	United States	
2011	Tinker Tailor Soldier Spy	Bill Haydon	Colin Firth	Bill is a senior officer in the British Secret Intelligence Service.	United Kingdom	
2011	Unforgivable	Judith	Carole Bouquet	Judith is in a relationship Francis. Her former female lover is beset by a disease.	France	
2012	Cloud Atlas	Robert Frobisher	Ben Whishaw	Robert, living in 1930s Britain, is a budding composer, and apprentice of musical genius Vyvyan Ayrs. Rufus is Robert's lover.	Germany	
2012	Cloud Atlas	Robert Frobisher	Ben Whishaw	Robert, living in 1930s Britain, is a budding composer, and apprentice of musical genius Vyvyan Ayrs. Rufus is Robert's lover.	United States	
2012	Love Is Not Perfect	Elena	Anna Foglietta	Elena has her first romantic relationship with a woman.	Italy	
2012	Speechless	Han Dong	Jian Jiang	Luke had previously had a romantic affair with a young male university student Han Dong.	Hong Kong	
2012	Speechless	Han Dong	Jian Jiang	Luke had previously had a romantic affair with a young male university student Han Dong.	China	
2013	Blue Is the Warmest Colour	Adèle	Adèle Exarchopoulos	Adèle meets Emma in a lesbian bar. They begin a romantic relationship and live together. After she cheats with Antoine, a male colleague, the relationship with Emma ends. Some reviewers said that bisexual erasure is "central to understanding Adele's particular sense that she does not belong as she comes of age."	France	
2013	Free Fall	Marc Borgmann	Hanno Koffler	Borgmann is a young police officer, who's on a training course for the riot control unit.	Germany	
2013	Kill Your Darlings	Allen Ginsberg	Daniel Radcliffe	Ginsberg is a poet.	United Kingdom	
2013	The Mortal Instruments: City of Bones	Magnus Bane	Godfrey Gao	Magnus, a bisexual warlock, first appears in "heavy guyliner, piercings and a disturbing blazer-and-boxers combo."	United States	
2013	Side Effects	Emily Taylor	Rooney Mara	Taylor is a New York socialite who drives into a wall in an apparent suicide attempt.	United States	
2013	Snowpiercer	Wilford	Ed Harris	Wilford is the creator and caretaker of the engine.	South Korea, Czech Republic	
2013	Snowpiercer	Wilford	Tyler John Williams	Wilford is the creator and caretaker of the engine.	South Korea, Czech Republic	
2013	Tom at the Farm	Francis Longchamp	Pierre-Yves Cardinal	Tom travels to an isolated farm for his lover's funeral where he's quickly drawn into a twisted, sexually charged game by his lover's aggressive brother, Francis.	Canada	
2014	Appropriate Behavior	Shirin	Desiree Akhavan	Shirin is the daughter of well-off Persian immigrants.	United Kingdom	
2014	Coming In	Tom Herzner	Kostja Ullmann	Tom Herzner is a gay hairdresser who has a boyfriend named Robert, but falls in love with a beauty parlor owner named Heidi.	Germany	
2014	The Grand Budapest Hotel	Monsieur Gustave H.	Ralph Fiennes	Gustave admitted sleeping with all his friends and being straight up called bisexual by Dmitri.	United States	
2014	The Grand Budapest Hotel	Monsieur Gustave H.	Ralph Fiennes	Gustave admitted sleeping with all his friends and being straight up called bisexual by Dmitri.	Germany	
2014	The Skeleton Twins	Rich Levitt	Ty Burrell	Milo reconnects with his high school English teacher Rich, with whom he had a sexual relationship when he was 15. Rich now has a sixteen-year-old son and is dating a woman.	United States	

=== 2015–2019 ===
List
Year	Title	Character(s)	Actor	Notes	Country	Ref(s)
2015	Legend	Lord Boothby	John Sessions	Boothby is a British politician.	France	
2015	Legend	Lord Boothby	John Sessions	Boothby is a British politician.	United Kingdom	
2015	Utopians	Hins Gao	Adonis He Fei	Hins Gao is in a relationship with his female classmate Joy, but gradually becomes attracted to his professor, Ming.	Hong Kong	
2016	Moonlight	Kevin Jones	André Holland	Kevin is Chiron's childhood friend. During their teenage years, they kiss and Kevin masturbates Chiron. After he breaks up with his girlfriend, he is visited by Chiron, who admits he has not been intimate with anybody since their encounter years ago.	United States	
2016	Moonlight	Kevin Jones	Jharrel Jerome	Kevin is Chiron's childhood friend. During their teenage years, they kiss and Kevin masturbates Chiron. After he breaks up with his girlfriend, he is visited by Chiron, who admits he has not been intimate with anybody since their encounter years ago.	United States	
2016	Moonlight	Kevin Jones	Jaden Piner	Kevin is Chiron's childhood friend. During their teenage years, they kiss and Kevin masturbates Chiron. After he breaks up with his girlfriend, he is visited by Chiron, who admits he has not been intimate with anybody since their encounter years ago.	United States	
2016	Lovesong	Mindy	Jena Malone	Sarah is a stay-at-home mom married to a man who's always away on business. She then begins a relationship with her best friend Mindy.	United States	
2016	Lovesong	Sarah	Riley Keough	Sarah is a stay-at-home mom married to a man who's always away on business. She then begins a relationship with her best friend Mindy.	United States	
2017	Atomic Blonde	Lorraine Broughton	Charlize Theron	Lorraine, an MI6 secret agent, meets undercover French agent Delphine in a bar. They kiss passionately. Later they have sex, which evolves into a romantic relationship. The emotionally intimate post-sex scene between Lorraine and Delphine was deleted in the final cut but included in the DVD/Blu-ray bonus features under the title "Not Afraid of Love".	United States	
2017	Call Me by Your Name	Oliver	Armie Hammer	The film chronicles the romantic relationship between 17-year-old Elio and 24-year-old Oliver, a graduate-student assistant to Elio's father. Elio had a girlfriend with whom he broke up later. In the end of the film, Oliver married a woman back in America.	Brazil	
2017	Call Me by Your Name	Elio Perlman	Timothée Chalamet	The film chronicles the romantic relationship between 17-year-old Elio and 24-year-old Oliver, a graduate-student assistant to Elio's father. Elio had a girlfriend with whom he broke up later. In the end of the film, Oliver married a woman back in America.	France	
2017	Call Me by Your Name	Elio Perlman	Timothée Chalamet	The film chronicles the romantic relationship between 17-year-old Elio and 24-year-old Oliver, a graduate-student assistant to Elio's father. Elio had a girlfriend with whom he broke up later. In the end of the film, Oliver married a woman back in America.	Italy	
2017	Call Me by Your Name	Elio Perlman	Timothée Chalamet	The film chronicles the romantic relationship between 17-year-old Elio and 24-year-old Oliver, a graduate-student assistant to Elio's father. Elio had a girlfriend with whom he broke up later. In the end of the film, Oliver married a woman back in America.	United States	
2017	Disobedience	Ronit Krushka	Rachel Weisz	Ronit is the daughter of a rabbi and community authority; she had a forbidden romance with Esti when they were teenagers and was sent away by her father after he discovered their relationship. When she returns to London after the death of her father, the sexual attraction between her and Esti is reignited.	United States, Ireland, United Kingdom	
2017	Princess Cyd	Cyd	Jessie Pinnick	Cyd visits her aunt in Chicago for a few weeks. While there, she develops a crush on another girl, Katie, and pursues a relationship with her. She also has a one-night stand with her aunt's friends' son.	United States	
2017	Rough Night	Blair	Zoë Kravitz	Blair is a real estate agent and Frankie's ex-lover.	United States	
2017	Song to Song	Faye	Rooney Mara	Faye has a relationship with Zoey, a lesbian French artist living in the US.	United States	
2018	Bohemian Rhapsody	Freddie Mercury	Rami Malek	The film tells the story of the life of Freddie Mercury, the lead singer of British rock band Queen, from the formation of the band in 1970 up to their 1985 Live Aid performance at the original Wembley Stadium.	United Kingdom	
2018	Bohemian Rhapsody	Freddie Mercury	Rami Malek	The film tells the story of the life of Freddie Mercury, the lead singer of British rock band Queen, from the formation of the band in 1970 up to their 1985 Live Aid performance at the original Wembley Stadium.	United States	
2018	Colette	Gabrielle Colette	Keira Knightley	Biopic about the French novelist. Colette lived openly as a bisexual and had relationships with many prominent women.	United States	
2018	Colette	Gabrielle Colette	Keira Knightley	Biopic about the French novelist. Colette lived openly as a bisexual and had relationships with many prominent women.	United Kingdom	
2018	Colette	Gabrielle Colette	Keira Knightley	Biopic about the French novelist. Colette lived openly as a bisexual and had relationships with many prominent women.	Hungary	
2018	Diamantino	Aisha Brito	Cleo Tavares	Aisha is a Secret Service agent working undercover as a refugee orphan teenage boy. She has a lesbian girlfriend, Aisha.	Portugal	
2018	Diamantino	Aisha Brito	Cleo Tavares	Aisha is a Secret Service agent working undercover as a refugee orphan teenage boy. She has a lesbian girlfriend, Aisha.	France	
2018	Diamantino	Aisha Brito	Cleo Tavares	Aisha is a Secret Service agent working undercover as a refugee orphan teenage boy. She has a lesbian girlfriend, Aisha.	Brazil	
2018	The Favourite	Sarah Churchill	Rachel Weisz	The plot examines the relationship between Queen Anne and cousins Sarah Churchill and Abigail Masham, who are both vying to be the court favourite.	United Kingdom, Ireland, United States	
2018	In a Relationship	Hallie	Emma Roberts	Hallie reveals her relationship with Lindsay via text message to her boyfriend Owen.	United States	
2018	Love, Simon	Cal Price	Miles Heizer	Based on the novel Simon vs. the Homo Sapiens Agenda.	United States	
2018	Vita & Virginia	Vita Sackville-West	Gemma Arterton	The film tells the story of the love affair between Sackville-West and Woolf.	United Kingdom, Ireland	
2018	Vita & Virginia	Virginia Woolf	Elizabeth Debicki	The film tells the story of the love affair between Sackville-West and Woolf.	United Kingdom, Ireland	
2019	Anna	Anna Poliatova	Sasha Luss	A double agent assassin. She is in a relationship with fellow fashion model Maude as a cover. She has sex with Alexander Tchenkov, her KGB handler, and Leonard Miller, her CIA handler.	France	
2019	Anna	Anna Poliatova	Sasha Luss	A double agent assassin. She is in a relationship with fellow fashion model Maude as a cover. She has sex with Alexander Tchenkov, her KGB handler, and Leonard Miller, her CIA handler.	United States	
2019	Bombshell	Kayla Pospisil	Margot Robbie	Kayla has a sexual relationship with Jess Carr, but says she's not a lesbian. Later in the movie she goes on a date with a man.	United States	
2019	Bombshell	Kayla Pospisil	Margot Robbie	Kayla has a sexual relationship with Jess Carr, but says she's not a lesbian. Later in the movie she goes on a date with a man.	Canada	
2019	Matthias & Maxime	Maxime	Xavier Dolan	Matthias and Maxime are lifelong friends who discover they might have romantic feelings for each other.	Canada	
2019	Matthias & Maxime	Matthias	Gabriel D'Almeida	Matthias and Maxime are lifelong friends who discover they might have romantic feelings for each other.	Canada	
2019	Velvet Buzzsaw	Morf Vandewalt	Jake Gyllenhaal	Morf is an art critic who has his hands full juggling relationships with both male and female lovers.	United States	

=== 2020–2024 ===
List
Year	Title	Character(s)	Actor	Notes	Country	Ref(s)
2020	Ammonite	Charlotte Murchison	Saoirse Ronan	Charlotte is married to a geologist who hires paleontologist Mary Anning to care for her and keep her company while he's away on an expedition. While sharing time and days with Mary, Charlotte becomes romantically attracted to her.	United Kingdom	
2020	Ammonite	Charlotte Murchison	Saoirse Ronan	Charlotte is married to a geologist who hires paleontologist Mary Anning to care for her and keep her company while he's away on an expedition. While sharing time and days with Mary, Charlotte becomes romantically attracted to her.	Australia	
2020	Bruised	Jackie "Pretty Bull" Justice	Halle Berry	Jackie moves out with her son Manny from her abusive boyfriend Desi. She then begins an intimate relationship with trainer Bobbi Berroa.	United States	
2020	Bruised	Jackie "Pretty Bull" Justice	Halle Berry	Jackie moves out with her son Manny from her abusive boyfriend Desi. She then begins an intimate relationship with trainer Bobbi Berroa.	United Kingdom	
2020	The Craft: Legacy	Timmy Andrews	Nicholas Galitzine	Andrews has sex with Isaiah, Jacob's elder brother.	United States	
2020	Holly Slept Over	Audra	Britt Lower	Noel's wife Audra had a fling with her old college roomrate Holly.	United States	
2020	Ma Rainey's Black Bottom	Ma Rainey	Viola Davis	Rainey has a young girlfriend named Dussie Mae that all her bandmates know about. The story is based on the life of the famous blues singer.	United States	
2020	Summer of 85	David Gorman	Benjamin Voisin	The intense friendship and romance of teenagers Alexis and David during a summer in Normandy in 1985.	France	
2020	Summer of Mesa	Molly Miles	Lily Peony	Molly reconciles her feelings for Mesa and a boy named John.	United States	
2020	Tove	Tove Jansson	Alma Pöysti	During her lifetime, Tove Jansson had relationships with men named Sam Vanni, Tapio Tapiovaara & Atos Wirtanen and a woman named Vivica Bandler before meeting her life partner, Tuulikki Pietilä.	Finland	
2021	After Blue	Roxy	Paula Luna	Roxy is a teenage girl who lives in a community with her mother on the planet After Blue, a planet inhabited only by women in an undetermined future. Roxy's mother Zora finds romance with an artist Sternberg, an artist whose wealth cultural status have kept her above the fray.	France	
2021	After Blue	Sternberg	Vimala Pons	Roxy is a teenage girl who lives in a community with her mother on the planet After Blue, a planet inhabited only by women in an undetermined future. Roxy's mother Zora finds romance with an artist Sternberg, an artist whose wealth cultural status have kept her above the fray.	France	
2021	Anaïs in Love	Anaïs	Anaïs Demoustier	Anaïs is a spirited young woman who falls in love with Emilie, the novelist wife of the man with whom she's having an affair.	France	
2021	Anaïs in Love	Emilie	Valeria Bruni Tedeschi	Anaïs is a spirited young woman who falls in love with Emilie, the novelist wife of the man with whom she's having an affair.	France	
2021	The Fallout	Vada Cavell	Jenna Ortega	Vada, who has a boyfriend, kisses and has sex with Mia during a night of drinking.	United States	
2021	The First Girl I Loved	Sylvia	Renci Yeung	At the beginning of the film, Lee has a crush on her male teacher. She then starts a love affair with her best friend Sylvia. Years later, when Sylvia is preparing to marry her fiancé, she asks Lee to be her bridesmaid.	Hong Kong	
2021	The First Girl I Loved	Wing	Hedwig Tam	At the beginning of the film, Lee has a crush on her male teacher. She then starts a love affair with her best friend Sylvia. Years later, when Sylvia is preparing to marry her fiancé, she asks Lee to be her bridesmaid.	Hong Kong	
2021	The Green Knight	Lord	Joel Edgerton	Gawain encounters Lord in the forest, who gives him a kiss and has a lady.	United States	
2021	The Green Knight	Lord	Joel Edgerton	Gawain encounters Lord in the forest, who gives him a kiss and has a lady.	Canada	
2021	One Four Three	Genevieve	Ella McCready	Genevieve leaves her fiancé Paul to be in a relationship with Rebecca. On her way to meet with him, she is brutally attacked, leaving her with amnesia.	United Kingdom	
2021	Parallel Mothers	Janis Martínez Moreno	Penélope Cruz	Janis has sexual relationships with renowned forensic archaeologist Arturo and Ana, a teen single mother.	Spain	
2021	Ride or Die	Nanae Shinoda	Honami Sato	Nanae and her former classmate Rei turn to each other for love.	Japan	
2021	Twist	Nancy "Red" Lee	Sophie Simnett	Nancy is the girlfriend of Sikes, a female friend of Fagin.	United Kingdom	
2021	The United States vs. Billie Holiday	Billie Holiday	Andra Day	Billie is first married to Jimmy Monroe. She later begins a relationship with Joe Guy, and FBI agent Jimmy Fletcher. Later in her life, she enters into an abusive marriage with Louis McKay. Tallulah and Billie were involved romantically. Tallulah and Billie kiss in the film's trailer, but not in the film.	United States	
2021	The United States vs. Billie Holiday	Tallulah Bankhead	Natasha Lyonne	Billie is first married to Jimmy Monroe. She later begins a relationship with Joe Guy, and FBI agent Jimmy Fletcher. Later in her life, she enters into an abusive marriage with Louis McKay. Tallulah and Billie were involved romantically. Tallulah and Billie kiss in the film's trailer, but not in the film.	United States	
2021	Walk with Me	Amber Evans	Devin Dunne Cannon	Evans is a mother who leaves her husband, then unexpectedly falls in love with another woman.	United States	
2022	The Batman	Selina Kyle / Catwoman	Zoë Kravitz	This role is based on the character of the same name from the comics, who is bisexual. (Kravitz confirmed Selina's sexuality in an interview.)	United States	
2022	Bones and All	Lee	Timothée Chalamet	Lee is a cannibalistic teenager.	Italy	
2022	Bones and All	Lee	Timothée Chalamet	Lee is a cannibalistic teenager.	United States	
2022	Bones and All	Lee	Timothée Chalamet	Lee is a cannibalistic teenager.	United Kingdom	
2022	Crush	AJ	Auli'i Cravalho	Openly bi throughout the whole movie, with Paige's friends saying that she's bi, and later in the movie AJ talks about her coming out as bisexual.	United States	
2022	Everything Everywhere All at Once	Evelyn Quan Wang	Michelle Yeoh	In an alternate universe, Evelyn is in a romantic relationship with Deirdre.	United States	
2022	Everything Everywhere All at Once	Deirdre Beaubeirdra	Jamie Lee Curtis	In an alternate universe, Evelyn is in a romantic relationship with Deirdre.	United States	
2022	Jurassic World Dominion	Kayla Watts	DeWanda Wise	Watts is a former US Air Force pilot who aids Owen and Claire on their mission. (Wise confirmed the character's bisexuality in an interview.)	United States	
2022	My Policeman	Tom Burgess	Harry Styles	Set in 1950s Brighton, Tom is married to Marion while also being involved with Patrick.	United States	
2022	My Policeman	Tom Burgess	Linus Roache	Set in 1950s Brighton, Tom is married to Marion while also being involved with Patrick.	United States	
2022	They/Them	Veronica	Monique Kim	Veronica is a frustrated bisexual sent to the Whistler Camp, a conversion camp.	United States	
2022	Whitney Houston: I Wanna Dance with Somebody	Whitney Houston	Naomi Ackie	This version of Houston has a girlfriend.	United States	
2023	Anatomy of a Fall	Sandra Voyter	Sandra Hüller	Voyter is a writer trying to prove her innocence in her husband's death	France	
2023	Chestnut	Annie	Natalia Dyer	Annie was attracted to both her new friends Tyler and Danny.	United States	
2023	The Color Purple	Shug Avery	Taraji P. Henson	Avery is Mister's longtime lover, who has a husband and sleeps with Celie.	United States	
2023	Cora Bora	Cora	Megan Stalter	Cora is a musician who decided to pack up and leave Portland to move to Los Angeles to further her career, leaving behind her dog and her girlfriend.	United States	
2023	Maestro	Leonard Bernstein	Bradley Cooper	Bernstein was a world-famous composer, who was married to Felicia Montealegre, yet he also has affairs with men over the years.	United States	
2023	Passages	Tomas	Franz Rogowski	Tomas is married to Martin, but has an affair with Agathe.	France	
2023	Poor Things	Bella Baxter	Emma Stone	Baxter is a young woman in Victorian London who has been brought back to life via brain transplant.	Ireland, United Kingdom, United States	
2023	Red, White & Royal Blue	Alex Claremont-Diaz	Taylor Zakhar Perez	Alex is in a relationship with Prince Henry. He comes out to him as bisexual after their first hook up and later, he also comes out to his mother.	United States	
2023	Shortcomings	Sasha	Debby Ryan	Ben goes on a date with Sasha, who openly speaks about her bisexuality.	United States	
2023	Unicorns	Luke Tilson	Ben Hardy	Luke makes out with drag queen Aysha, aka Ashiq (Jason Patel), a self-identified "gaysian", unaware he's a man; he later begins to question his sexual orientation when he develops mutual feelings.	Sweden, United Kingdom, United States	
2024	The Astronaut Lovers	Maxi	Lautaro Bettoni	After he broke up with his girlfriend, Maxi begins a relationship with his childhood friend Pedro.	Argentina, Spain	
2024	Challengers	Patrick Zweig	Josh O'Connor	Patrick is romantically involved with Tashi and attracted to Art. He's also seen interacting with men and women in a dating app.	United States	
2024	Gladiator II	Macrinus	Denzel Washington	Macrinus is a former slave who plans to control Rome. He keeps a stable of gladiators and mentors Lucius.	United Kingdom, United States	
2024	Love Lies Bleeding	Jackie	Katy O'Brian	Jackie is an aspiring bodybuilder.	United States	
2024	My Old Ass	Elliott LaBrant	Maisy Stella	Maisy is a student who is about to go off to university.	United States	
2024	On Swift Horses	Muriel Edwards Walker	Daisy Edgar-Jones	Lee's wife Muriel meets and begins a relationship with Sandra.	United States	
2024	Stress Positions	Karla	Theda Hammel	Karla is Terry's best friend.	United States	
2024	What a Feeling	Marie Therese	Caroline Peters	When her husband separates from her on their wedding anniversary, the middle-aged doctor Marie Therese falls in love with the sex-positive lesbian Fa after meeting her in a lesbian bar.	Austria	

=== 2025 ===
Year	Title	Character(s)	Actor	Notes	Country	Ref(s)
2025	The Chronology of Water	Lidia Yuknavitch	Imogen Poots	Yuknavitch enrolls at the University of Oregon and is one of a few students selected to work with Ken Kesey on his collaborative novel Caverns. During this time, Lidia continues to experiment with drugs and explore her bisexual identity through BDSM.	France, Latvia, United Kingdom, United States	
2025	Hedda	Hedda Gabler	Tessa Thompson	Hedda, newly married and bored with both her marriage and life, seeks to influence a human fate for the first time. Her former lover, Eileen is an author competing for the same professorship sought by Hedda's husband. The film is a reimagining of the 1891 play Hedda Gabler by Henrik Ibsen.	United States	
2025	Hot Milk	Ingrid	Vicky Krieps	Ingrid is a German tourist Sofia met while horse-riding along the beach.	United Kingdom, Greece	
2025	I Know What You Did Last Summer	Ava Brucks	Chase Sui Wonders	In one scene, Brucks hooks up with Trevino, a true crime podcaster, at the airport bathroom.	United States	
2025	I Know What You Did Last Summer	Tyler Trevino	Gabbriette Bechtel	In one scene, Brucks hooks up with Trevino, a true crime podcaster, at the airport bathroom.	United States	
2025	100 Nights of Hero	Cherry	Maika Monroe	Cherry is caught in a love triangle between Hero, her maid, and Manfred, a visiting houseguest.	United Kingdom, United States	
2025	Satisfaction	Lola	Emma Laird	Lola is a British composer who becomes distant with her partner Philip, before meeting Elena and forcing her to confront her dark past.	United States, Italy, Greece, Ukraine	

=== 2026 ===
Year	Title	Character(s)	Actor	Notes	Country	Ref(s)
2026	Teenage Sex and Death at Camp Miasma	Thor	Aren Buchholz	Mari's male sexual partner who is described as bisexual.	United States	

== See also ==
- List of bisexual characters in television
- List of fictional bisexual characters
- List of LGBT-related films
- List of LGBT-related films by year
