= Julika Jenkins =

German actress (born 1971)

- Born: 20 October 1971 (age 54); Heidelberg, Baden-Württemberg, West Germany
- Occupation: Actress
- Years active: 1993–present
- Known for: Dark

Julika Jenkins (born 20 October 1971) is a German actress. She lives in Berlin with her partner, actor Arnd Klawitter. She has appeared in stage, television, and film productions in Switzerland and Germany. She is best known for her role as Claudia Tiedemann in the German Netflix original series Dark.

== Biography ==
Jenkins grew up in Heidelberg, the daughter of a Welsh and German couple. She completed her acting training at the Otto Falckenberg School of the Performing Arts in Munich. She made her theatre debut in 1993 in a production of The Moon in the Grass by Robert Wilson at the Munich Kammerspiele theatre. From 1994 to 1999, Jenkins belonged to the ensemble at the Theater am Neumarkt in Zurich, Switzerland. From 1999 until 2003, she performed at the Schaubühne theatre on Lehniner Platz in Berlin. Guest performances followed at a number of theatres in Switzerland and Germany.

In 2006, Jenkins got a role in the Fredi M. Murer film Vitus, where she starred alongside real-life piano prodigy Teo Gheorghiu, as well as Bruno Ganz and Urs Jucker. In 2009, Jenkins appeared again on the big screen next to Jean-Paul Belmondo in A Man and His Dog, a remake of the Vittorio De Sica classic Umberto D. Since 2017, she has appeared in the Netflix original series Dark as Claudia Tiedemann.

== Selected filmography ==
=== Television ===
List of television appearances, with year, title, and role shown
Year	Title	Role	Notes
2003	Tatort	Roswitha Baermann	1 episode
2004	SK Kölsch		1 episode
2007	KDD – Kriminaldauerdienst		4 episodes
2009, 2015	Notruf Hafenkante	different roles	2 episodes
2010	Allein gegen die Zeit		4 episodes
2010, 2011	Tatort	Staatsanwältin Johannson / Dr. Antje Berger	2 episodes
2010	SOKO Wismar		1 episode
2011	Tatort	Nadine Joswig	1 episode
2014–2020	Letzte Spur Berlin		3 episodes
2015	Der Kriminalist		1 episode
2015, 2018	Stuttgart Homicide	different roles	2 episodes
2016	Berlin Station	Ruth Iosava	6 episodes
2016	Tatort	Carmen Hartmann / Cornelia Mai	2 episodes
2017–2020	Dark	Claudia Tiedemann	14 episodes
2019	Tatort	Birte Knopp	1 episode
2020	Polizeiruf 110	Dr. Regine Arnim	1 episode
2023	Dear Child	Karin Beck	6 episodes

=== Film ===
List of film appearances, with year, title, and role shown
Year	Title	Role	Notes
2006	Vitus	Helen Von Holzen	
2008	A Man and His Dog	Jeanne	
2015	The Nightmare	Tina's mother	
