= Dora: A Headcase =

2012 novel by Lidia Yuknavitch

- Author: Lidia Yuknavitch
- Language: English
- Genre: Contemporary fiction
- Publisher: Hawthorne Books
- Publication date: August 7, 2012
- Publication place: United States
- Pages: 237
- ISBN: 978-0983477570 Paperback original edition

Dora: A Headcase is a 2012 novel by Lidia Yuknavitch. It is a modern, feminist retelling of Sigmund Freud's famous case study, Dora. The introduction of the novel is by Chuck Palahniuk.

== Summary ==
Ida is a savvy Seattle teen with a problem: Every time she gets emotional, especially romantically, she loses her voice or faints. Ida's mother is consumed by alcoholism, and her father by his affair with Mrs. K., the wife of a man who propositioned Ida when she was 14. It is her father's idea that Ida go to therapy, where she enters a confrontational relationship with her psychologist, Siggy. Ida keeps track of their conversations with a recorder she hides in her rebelliously tricked-out Dora the Explorer purse. She especially objects to Siggy's seeming obsession with sex. Ida has no experience in this area, though she is deeply in love with Obsidian. However, any time the two seem to be going beyond kissing, Ida faints or loses her voice. Ida isn't really sure what Obsidian's intentions are, but the two, along with their group of friends ("the posse"), take drugs and stage "art attacks" around the city. The most daring of these attacks involves a secret recording of a conversation between Siggy and a mysterious man, intended to be made into an art film. But when Ida finds her father having a heart attack at a nearby hospital, some raw footage of her film goes viral with unexpected consequences, as things quickly get out of control.

== Characters ==
- Ida – The protagonist, a 17-year-old who loves radical art and music; is disappointed with and alienated from her parents; hangs out with her "posse"; and seems determined to get her therapist "Siggy", whom she resents, into trouble.
- Siggy – Ida's therapist. Ida doesn't want to be in therapy and challenges Siggy at every turn. By the time she is done with him, he has been arrested and hospitalized.
- Obsidian – Ida's Native American love interest, part of the posse.
- The posse – Ida's friends, whom she describes: "The posse is not 'my peers.' We are more like a microorganism... In the world of the posse, it doesn't matter if you are male or female. Or anything in between. We share drugs. We share bodies. We make art attacks." The group includes a bulimic girl,
  a teen using a wheelchair, a Native American rape victim, and a gay boy named Little Teena.
- Marlene – A Black transgender woman who is a refugee from Rwanda. Marlene is a sort of stand-in for Ida's drug- and alcohol-abusing mother; she lends Ida wigs and books of erotic art.

== Background: Ida Bauer ==
Dora: a Headcase is based on one of Sigmund Freud's seminal case studies, that of Ida Bauer, whom he called "Dora" in his notes. Bauer was 18 years old when she came to Freud for treatment in 1900, and he diagnosed her as an "hysteric". Bauer lost her voice and had coughing fits, perhaps the result of trauma, resulting from ongoing sexual abuse or attempted sexual abuse, which she reported to her parents who didn't believe her. The man she accused, Herr K, was a close friend of the Bauer family, and according to Ida, her father was carrying on an affair with his wife. She felt her father was surreptitiously palming her off on this man in return. Freud initially gained Bauer's confidence by apparently accepting her story, but when he insisted she accept her own implication in the complex interfamily drama, and admit to an attraction to the man who assaulted her, he alienated his patient, who abruptly finished the treatment after 11 weeks, producing, Freud reported bitterly, a therapeutic failure.

== Critical reception ==
Publishers Weekly called Yuknavitch's debut "audacious", stating that she "nails the whip-smart angst of a teenage girl trapped in a world both familiar and unique, and her ease with language makes her a prose stylist to envy."

Boston Globe reviewer Eugenia Williamson warns against seeing Ida as a representative of : "Ida is more than just an avatar of generational conflict; she's also a lover of music and art. She writes impassioned letters to Francis Bacon in purple marker on her bedroom walls. She listens to Black Flag, Elliott Smith, and the Velvet Underground. She has passionate opinions about avant garde filmmaker Maya Deren. These advanced tastes age Ida out of her demographic, but they also reveal the true purpose of her character: Ida is less a teenager than a radical everywoman whose outrageous antics expose the fault lines in the dominant culture. The novel isn't an anthropological exploration of the tech-fueled peculiarities of Gen Z. Instead, it's a fantasy, one that allows Yuknavitch to exact revenge on Freud."

In Mother Jones, Hannah Levintova reports that "It’s not just alt-girlhood that Yuknavitch is defending: Ida’s dearest friends are ... a marginalized crew intended to critique how society deals with difference." She quotes Yunavitch, who said: "We point at someone and say ‘sick’ and point at another person and say ‘healthy’ in ways that are hypocritical and disgusting to me, I am trying to attack that."
