= Reading the Waves =

2025 memoir by Lidia Yuknavitch

- First edition cover
- Author: Lidia Yuknavitch
- Publisher: Riverhead Books
- Publication date: February 4, 2025
- Pages: 224
- Award: Lambda Literary Award for Bisexual Nonfiction (2026)
- ISBN: 978-0-593-71305-1

Reading the Waves: A Memoir is a 2025 memoir by American writer Lidia Yuknavitch. The book won the 2026 Lambda Literary Award for Bisexual Nonfiction.

== Summary ==
Reading the Waves consists of several vignettes about Yuknavitch's life written in non-chronological order, beginning with the sentiment that " memory is iterative and remembering is an act of storytelling". Yuknavitch explores the following questions: "When we revisit memories and retell our stories, how does it change us and the stories of our identities? How can memory be unreliable, particularly in the face of trauma, and how does revisiting, rediscovering, affect us?"

Vignettes discuss various subjects, including her complicated relationships with her parents, including her abusive father, both of whom are now dead; her daughter's stillbirth; sexual relationships; her ex-husband's death by suicide; two separate murders of women she knew; and more.

== Style ==
Reading the Waves consists of "lyrical, short story–like chapters", with a style compared to the works of Virginia Woolf and Toni Morrison. The memoir includes wordplay, which Booklist's Leah von Essen noted "can feel indulgent". Alternatively, Publishers Weekly stated that the "moody, evocative prose [...] never tilts into preciousness".

== Themes ==
Reading the Waves explores themes related to memory, trauma, healing, feminism, self-discovery, homophobia, and ableism.

== Reception ==
Reading the Waves received starred reviews from Booklist, Library Journal, Publishers Weekly. Booklist's Leah von Essen described Reading the Waves as "remarkable", "twisting", and "at turns emotional and darkly hilarious", while Publishers Weekly referred to it as a "stunning, genre-bending self-portrait".

Reviewers generally appreciated how the work serves as a meditation on memory, particularly given that some of the memories shared in Reading the Waves were also featured in Yuknavitch's 2011 memoir, The Chronology of Water, though Yuknavitch's perspective on the events as changed with time. According to Anita Felicelli, writing for Alta Online, "Sometimes the observations can be New Age aphoristic, coming off a bit teacherly [...] as Yuknavitch tells us how to understand her viewpoint without allowing for the ambiguity and engagement of dramatic scenes"; despite this, Felicelli generally reviewed the memoir positively.

Reading the Waves won the 2026 Lambda Literary Award for Bisexual Nonfiction.
