= The Chronology of Water (book) =

2011 memoir by Lidia Yuknavitch

- Author: Lidia Yuknavitch
- Publisher: Hawthorne Books
- Publication date: April 12, 2011
- ISBN: 978-0-9790188-3-1

The Chronology of Water is a 2011 memoir by American writer Lidia Yuknavitch.

== Synopsis ==
Hoping to escape an abusive household, Lidia Yuknavitch enrolls in a Texas college on a swimming scholarship with an eye towards the Olympics. Her hopes of a swimming career are dashed when she loses her scholarship due to alcohol and drug use. She later enrolls at the University of Oregon and is one of a few students selected to work with Ken Kesey on his collaborative novel Caverns. During this time, Lidia continues to experiment with drugs and explore her bisexual identity through BDSM. As she advances in her career, she becomes secure in her identity, meets her husband, and starts a family.

== Reception ==
The Oregonian named The Chronology of Water one of the best books of 2011. It was recognized as one of that year's best memoirs by Flavorwire. The book was a finalist for the 2012 PEN Center Creative Nonfiction Award.

== Film adaptation ==
At the 2018 Cannes Film Festival, actress Kristen Stewart announced her intention to adapt of The Chronology of Water as her feature directorial debut. In 2021, Imogen Poots was cast in the starring role. Principal photography for the film was planned for summer 2024 in Latvia. The Chronology of Water had its premiere in the Un Certain Regard section of the 2025 Cannes Film Festival on May 16, 2025. The film received positive reviews from critics.
