= Vitus (film) =

2006 film by Fredi M. Murer

- U.S. theatrical poster
- Directed by: Fredi M. Murer
- Written by: Peter Luisi; Fredi M. Murer; Lukas B. Suter
- Produced by: Christian Davi; Christof Neracher
- Starring: Teo Gheorghiu; Bruno Ganz; Julika Jenkins; Urs Jucker
- Cinematography: Pio Corradi
- Edited by: Myriam Flury
- Music by: Mario Beretta
- Distributed by: Sony Pictures Classics
- Release date: 2 February 2006 (Switzerland)
- Running time: 100 minutes 123 minutes (US)
- Country: Switzerland
- Languages: Swiss German, occasional English

Vitus is a 2006 Swiss drama film written and directed by Fredi M. Murer and starring Teo Gheorghiu and Bruno Ganz. It follows a gifted child who longs for an ordinary childhood. It was selected as the Swiss entry for the Academy Award for Best Foreign Language Film at the 79th Academy Awards and was later shortlisted for the award. It won Best Fiction Film at the Swiss Film Prize in 2007.

== Synopsis ==
Vitus is a gifted child whose musical talent leads his parents to push him toward a career as a pianist. Instead, he prefers spending time in his eccentric grandfather’s workshop and longs for a more ordinary childhood. After falling from a balcony, he is regarded as an ordinary boy.

== Cast ==
The cast includes:

- Teo Gheorghiu as Vitus
- Bruno Ganz as Grandfather
- Julika Jenkins as Mother
- Urs Jucker as Father
- Eleni Haupt as Luisa

== Release ==
Vitus premiered in February 2006. It had its international premiere at the Berlin Film Festival. By late 2006, it had been sold to more than 30 countries, including the United States.

== Reception ==
=== Awards ===
Vitus was selected as the Swiss entry for the Academy Award for Best Foreign Language Film at the 79th Academy Awards in 2006, and in January 2007 it was shortlisted among the final nine films for the award.

In 2006, the film won audience awards at festivals in Rome, Chicago, and Los Angeles. In 2007, it won the Best Fiction Film award at the Swiss Film Prize in Solothurn. It later received additional festival prizes, including the Augenblick Prize at the Strasbourg Augenblick Festival in 2007, the Special Screening Prize at the Pyongyang International Film Festival in 2008, and a shared first audience award at the Festival Internacional de Cine Arte & Cultura in Asunción in 2008.

=== Critical response ===
On Rotten Tomatoes, Vitus has an approval rating of 80%, based on 60 reviews. On Metacritic, the film has a score of 63 out of 100, based on 19 critic reviews.

== Festival screenings ==
After its initial release, Vitus continued to screen at international film festivals, including the Seattle International Film Festival and San Francisco International Film Festival in 2007, the Shanghai International Film Festival in 2007, and the Zlín International Film Festival for Children and Youth in 2017.

== See also ==
- List of submissions to the 79th Academy Awards for Best Foreign Language Film
- List of Swiss submissions for the Academy Award for Best Foreign Language Film
