= Lidia Yuknavitch =

American writer, teacher and editor

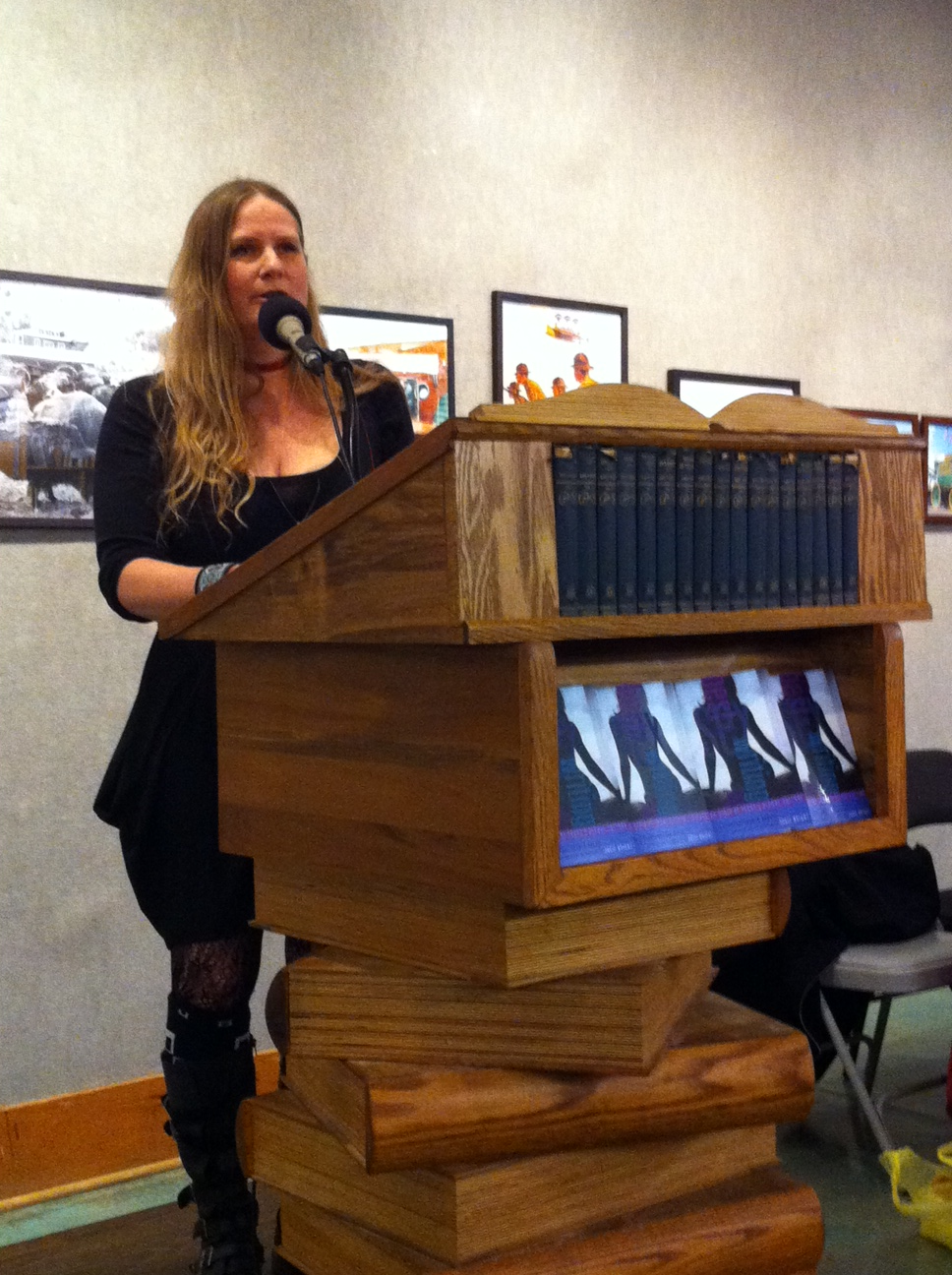
- Yuknavitch in 2012
- Born: Lidia Yukman; June 18, 1963 (age 63); San Francisco, California, U.S.
- Education: University of Oregon
- Occupations: Writer, educator
- Spouses: Philip (divorced); Devin Eugene Crowe (divorced); Andy Mingo (separated)
- Children: 1
- Writing career
- Language: English
- Notable works: The Chronology of Water (2011); Reading the Waves (2025)

Lidia Yuknavitch (/ˈjuːknəvɪtʃ/ YOOK-nə-vitch; born June 18, 1963) is an American writer, teacher and editor based in Oregon. She is the author of the memoir The Chronology of Water, and the novels The Small Backs of Children, Dora: A Headcase, and The Book of Joan. She is also known for her TED talk, "The Beauty of Being a Misfit", and its associated book, The Misfit's Manifesto.

== Early life ==
Lidia Yukman was born on June 18, 1963, in San Francisco, California, and raised in a Catholic family. Her father verbally, physically, and sexually abused her and her older sister, and her alcoholic mother did not intervene. As a teen, she was noticed by a "caring and methodical coach," who helped her move toward her dream of becoming a competitive swimmer. The family moved to Florida for additional training, and Yuknavitch began abusing alcohol.

Yuknavitch relocated to Texas after high school, where she attended Austin Community College on a swimming scholarship. While attending college, she worked as a receptionist at the University of Texas at Austin. Yuknavitch had hopes of qualifying for the United States Olympic swimming team, but her own drug and alcohol abuse ended her competitive swimming career.

After losing her scholarship, Yuknavitch moved to Eugene, Oregon, and enrolled in the University of Oregon. There, she was one of the editors of Two Girls Review, which later became 2 Gyrlz Performative Arts. She studied under Ken Kesey at the University of Oregon and earned her Ph.D. in English literature there.

== Career ==
In 1987–1988, Yuknavitch, then known as Lidia Yukman, collaborated with a novel-writing class at the University of Oregon taught by Ken Kesey that produced the book Caverns. Although the group of authors, collectively named "O. U. Levon", are often described as graduate students, Yuknavitch was not in graduate school at the time.

Her work has been published in Guernica, Ms., The Iowa Review, Zyzzyva, Another Chicago Magazine, PLAZM, The Sun, Exquisite Corpse, and TANK.

Yuknavitch is associated with fellow Oregon writers Chuck Palahniuk, who wrote the introduction to her novel Dora: A Headcase; Chelsea Cain, who wrote the introduction to The Chronology of Water; Monica Drake; Cheryl Strayed; and Tom Spanbauer. Yuknavitch introduced Spanbauer at the launch for his book I Loved You More at Powell's Books in Portland.

Yuknavitch's 2011 memoir, The Chronology of Water, has developed a strong following. A Huffington Post book review noted that two years after being published, the book "keeps popping up on blogs and social media feeds." Yuknavitch said she started writing the book as a kind of dare after talking to Chuck Palahniuk about memoir at the end of a meeting of their writers' group. The title comes from a short story Yuknavitch wrote in a writing workshop with Diana Abu-Jaber.

The photograph on the book jacket depicts a naked woman in the water. Yuknavitch and her publisher opted to wrap the book in a "belly band" in order to cover the woman's breast. Yuknavitch wrote about this decision in The Rumpus.

The film adaptation of The Chronology of Water, written and directed by Kristen Stewart, premiered in the Un Certain Regard section of the 2025 Cannes Film Festival on May 16, 2025. At Cannes and upon its theatrical release in late 2025, the film received largely positive reviews from critics, with Sheila O'Malley at RogerEbert.com writing,"Stewart boldly evokes the source material."

Dora: A Headcase, is Yuknavitch's novel about "Dora", the subject of a famous case study by Sigmund Freud. Yuknavitch wrote that she wanted to "give Dora back her voice and 'talk back' to Freud." In 2014, the book was optioned for a movie by Katherine Brooks.

The Small Backs of Children, published in 2015, was praised by Kirkus Reviews as a "brave and affecting novel."

Random House published Yuknavitch's first short story collection, Verge, on February 4, 2020.

Reading the Waves, published in 2025, won the 2026 Lambda Literary Award for Bisexual Literature.

== Personal life ==
Yuknavitch has had romantic relationships with both men and women, including Kathy Acker. She has been married three times. She lives in Eugene, Oregon. She and her ex-husband, the filmmaker Andy Mingo, have one son together, Miles.

Yuknavitch has taught writing, literature, film, and women's studies at Eastern Oregon University and at Mt. Hood Community College.

== Bibliography ==
- Caverns. Penguin Books. 1990. ISBN 9780140122084.
- Her Other Mouths. House of Bones Press. 1997. ISBN 9780965666503.
- Liberty's Excess: Fictions. Fiction Collective 2. 2000. ISBN 978-1-57366-084-6.
- Allegories of Violence. Routledge. 2000. ISBN 978-1-136-70713-1.
- Real to Reel. Fiction Collective 2. 2003. ISBN 978-1-57366-107-2.
- The Chronology of Water. Hawthorne Books. 2011. ISBN 978-0-9833049-0-6.
- Dora: A Headcase. Hawthorne Books. 2012. ISBN 978-0-9838504-7-2.
- The Small Backs of Children. Harper. 2015. ISBN 9780062383242.
- The Book of Joan. Harper. 2017. ISBN 9780062383273.
- The Misfit's Manifesto. TED Books. 2017. ISBN 978-1-5011-2006-0.
- Verge: Stories. Riverhead Books. 2020. ISBN 9780525534877.
- Thrust. Riverhead Books. 2022. ISBN 9780525534907.
- Reading the Waves: A Memoir. Riverhead Books. 2025. ISBN 9780593713051.
- The Big M: 13 Writers Take Back the Story of Menopause. Grand Central Publishing. 2026. ISBN 9781538765548.

== Awards ==
The Small Backs of Children

- 2016, Ken Kesey Award for Fiction Oregon Book Award
- 2016, Readers' Choice Oregon Book Award

The Chronology of Water

- 2012, Readers' Choice Oregon Book Award
- 2012, Finalist, PEN Center USA Creative Nonfiction Award
- 2012, Pacific Northwest Booksellers Association Award
- 2011, Best Books of the Year, The Oregonian
- 1997, Writers Exchange Award, Poets & Writers

== See also ==
- List of LGBT people from Portland, Oregon
