= Arnd Klawitter =

German stage, movie and television actor (born 1968)

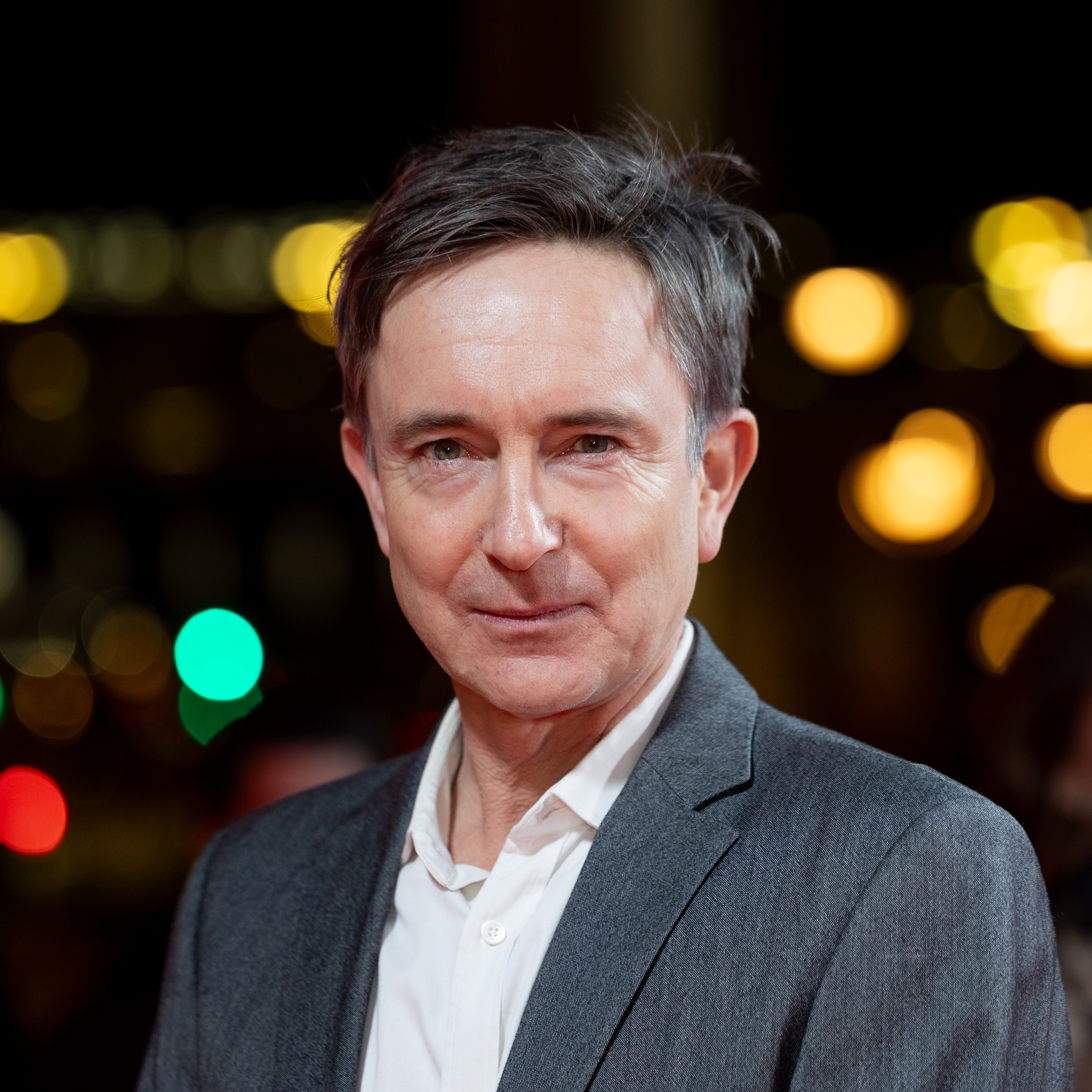
- Klawitter in 2026
- Born: 26 July 1968 (age 57); Hamburg, West Germany
- Occupation: Actor

Arnd Klawitter (born 26 July 1968) is a German stage, movie and television actor.

== Career ==
After his studies at Otto Falckenberg School of the Performing Arts in Munich, Arnd Klawitter joined the ensemble of the Munich Kammerspiele in 1994 for a year. From 1995 until 2001 he was engaged at Staatstheater Stuttgart, where he mostly played the leading man, e. g. Andri in Max Frisch's Andorra. Since 2001 he has worked as a freelance artist. As guest he has worked at important theatres like the Schauspielhaus Zürich and Bavarian Staatsschauspiel in Munich. During the RuhrTriennale 2007 he appeared in the first night of Juli Zeh's Corpus delicti. Since leaving acting school he has also worked for both TV and cinema frequently.

He appeared next to Franka Potente in After Five in the Forest Primeval (1995), and in the 1997 remake of Es geschah am hellichten Tag (It Happened in Broad Daylight). In 2000 he played with Matthew McConaughey and Jon Bon Jovi in the movie U-571 as the German Hydrophone Operator. He also appeared in the German movie Hitler Cantata in 2005. While in international productions he has only been cast in supporting roles, in his German films he has played leading characters, too. Klawitter is often chosen to play in historical films because of his slightly old fashioned appearance that can be compared to that of Ralph Fiennes.

On television he is frequently cast in crime series like the famous Tatort-series (Scene of the Crime) where he has appeared in three episodes so far, or - recently - Der Bulle von Tölz. His most successful production so far was the leading role in the acclaimed German TV miniseries Der Laden (The Shop), where he played next to Adolf-Grimme-Preis-winner Martin Benrath. In 2007 he appeared in GG 19 – Eine Reise durch Deutschland in 19 Artikeln, a film inspired by and called after the German constitution (Grundgesetz).

He lives in Berlin with his partner, actress Julika Jenkins.

== Selected filmography ==
Year	Title	Role	Notes
2012	A Coffee in Berlin		
2015	The Nightmare		
