= The Chronology of Water =

2025 film by Kristen Stewart

- Theatrical release poster
- Directed by: Kristen Stewart
- Screenplay by: Kristen Stewart
- Based on: The Chronology of Water by Lidia Yuknavitch
- Produced by: Michael Pruss; Rebecca Feuer; Charles Gillibert; Yulia Zayceva; Max Pavlov; Svetlana Punte; Maggie McLean; Kristen Stewart; Dylan Meyer
- Starring: Imogen Poots; Thora Birch; Susannah Flood; Tom Sturridge; Kim Gordon; Michael Epp; Earl Cave; Esmé Creed-Miles; Jim Belushi
- Cinematography: Corey C. Waters
- Edited by: Olivia Neergaard-Holm
- Music by: Paris Hurley
- Production companies: Scott Free Productions; CG Cinéma; Nevermind Pictures; Forma Pro Films; Curious Gremlin; Fremantle; Whiz Movies; Lorem Ipsum Entertainment; Scala Films
- Distributed by: Les Films du Losange (France); The Forge (United States); British Film Institute (United Kingdom)
- Release dates: May 16, 2025 (Cannes); October 15, 2025 (France); December 5, 2025 (United States); February 6, 2026 (United Kingdom)
- Running time: 128 minutes
- Countries: France; Latvia; United Kingdom; United States
- Language: English
- Box office: $497,384

The Chronology of Water is a 2025 psychological drama film co-produced, written and directed by Kristen Stewart, in her feature film directorial debut, and based on the 2011 memoir of the same name by Lidia Yuknavitch. It stars Imogen Poots as Yuknavitch, along with Thora Birch, Susannah Flood, Tom Sturridge, Kim Gordon, Michael Epp, Earl Cave, Esmé Creed-Miles, and Jim Belushi in supporting roles.

The Chronology of Water premiered in the Un Certain Regard section of the 2025 Cannes Film Festival on May 16, 2025. The film received generally positive reviews from critics.

== Plot ==
Lidia Yuknavitch develops a passion for both writing and swimming at a young age, seeing them as a reprieve from her home life, where her father Mike physically and sexually abuses her and her older sister Claudia, and her alcoholic mother Dorothy ignores the abuse. Claudia flees from the household as a teenager.

Mike attempts to keep Lidia from going to college as a means of control, but Lidia manages to fight back and leave for Texas to study, swim, and explore her sexuality. However, she is unable to escape the complicated memories of her father, and her excessive partying, drinking, and drug use quickly jeopardize her academic and sports career.

While on campus, Lidia meets Philip, who she quickly marries despite a problematic relationship: still traumatized from her father's abuse, she views Philip's sensitive and gentle nature as weak and passive, and begins to verbally and physically abuse him. After she becomes pregnant, she leaves him to move in with Claudia and Dorothy, hoping to raise her child together with them, but the baby is stillborn, devastating Lidia.

Lidia reconciles with Philip, spreads the baby's ashes at sea, and they amicably divorce; the memories of their marriage and the death of their daughter haunt Lidia throughout her life. Lidia loses her scholarship and is left rudderless, but a friend convinces her to join her at the University of Oregon to study under Ken Kesey, writing a collaborative novel with the other students in the class.

Lidia develops a strong bond with Kesey, who connects with her grief due to the loss of his own son. As her studies continue, she employs a BDSM therapist as a way to heal through her trauma. She weds her second husband, Devin, a relationship marked by passion and volatility she thought she was missing with Phillip, but the marriage quickly collapses.

After a live reading of her work, Lidia is extended an offer by a publishing company, but she continues to sink deeper into alcoholism, culminating in her getting into a car accident while driving drunk, leading to her arrest and community service sentence. Afterwards, Lidia begins teaching creative writing at Eastern Oregon University, where she meets her third husband, Andy, who has been following her career.

Though Lidia is initially resistant to the idea of having another child, Andy convinces her that she deserves to be a mother, and she eventually gives birth to their son, Miles. Lidia still maintains a relationship with her ageing father, who finally acknowledges the abuse he inflicted. The film concludes with the young family swimming at a lake, with Lidia reflecting on the power of water to heal.

== Cast ==
- Imogen Poots as Lidia Yuknavitch
  - Anna Wittowsky and Kid Lidia
  - Angelika Mihailova as Lidia Toddler
- Thora Birch as Claudia, Lidia's older sister
- Susannah Flood as Dorothy, Lidia's alcoholic mother
- Michael Epp as Mike, Lidia's abusive father
- Jim Belushi as Ken Kesey
- Earl Cave as Phillip, Lidia's first husband
- Esmé Creed-Miles as Claire, Lidia's friend
- Tom Sturridge as Devin, Lidia's second husband
- Charlie Carrick as Andy Mingo, Lidia's third husband
- Kim Gordon as Photographer, a BDSM therapist
- Julienne Restall as Junkie Woman
- Eleanor Hahn as Carol Houck Smith
- Esmé Allen as Hannah

== Production ==
It was announced in November 2022 that Kristen Stewart was set to make her feature directorial debut with an adaptation of Lidia Yuknavitch's memoir The Chronology of Water, directing from a screenplay she co-wrote with Andy Mingo, while Imogen Poots was attached to star. Scott Free Productions financed the project, Ridley Scott, Michael Pruss and Mingo served as producers, and Scott Aharoni, Sinan Eczacibasi, Metin Alihan Yalcindag and Rebecca Feuer were executive producers. In September 2024, Thora Birch, Earl Cave, Michael Epp, Susannah Flood, Kim Gordon and Jim Belushi joined the cast of the film.

Principal photography took place in Latvia and Malta over six weeks in June and July 2024. Cinematographer Corey C. Waters shot the film on 16mm, using a 1.66:1 ratio.

== Release ==
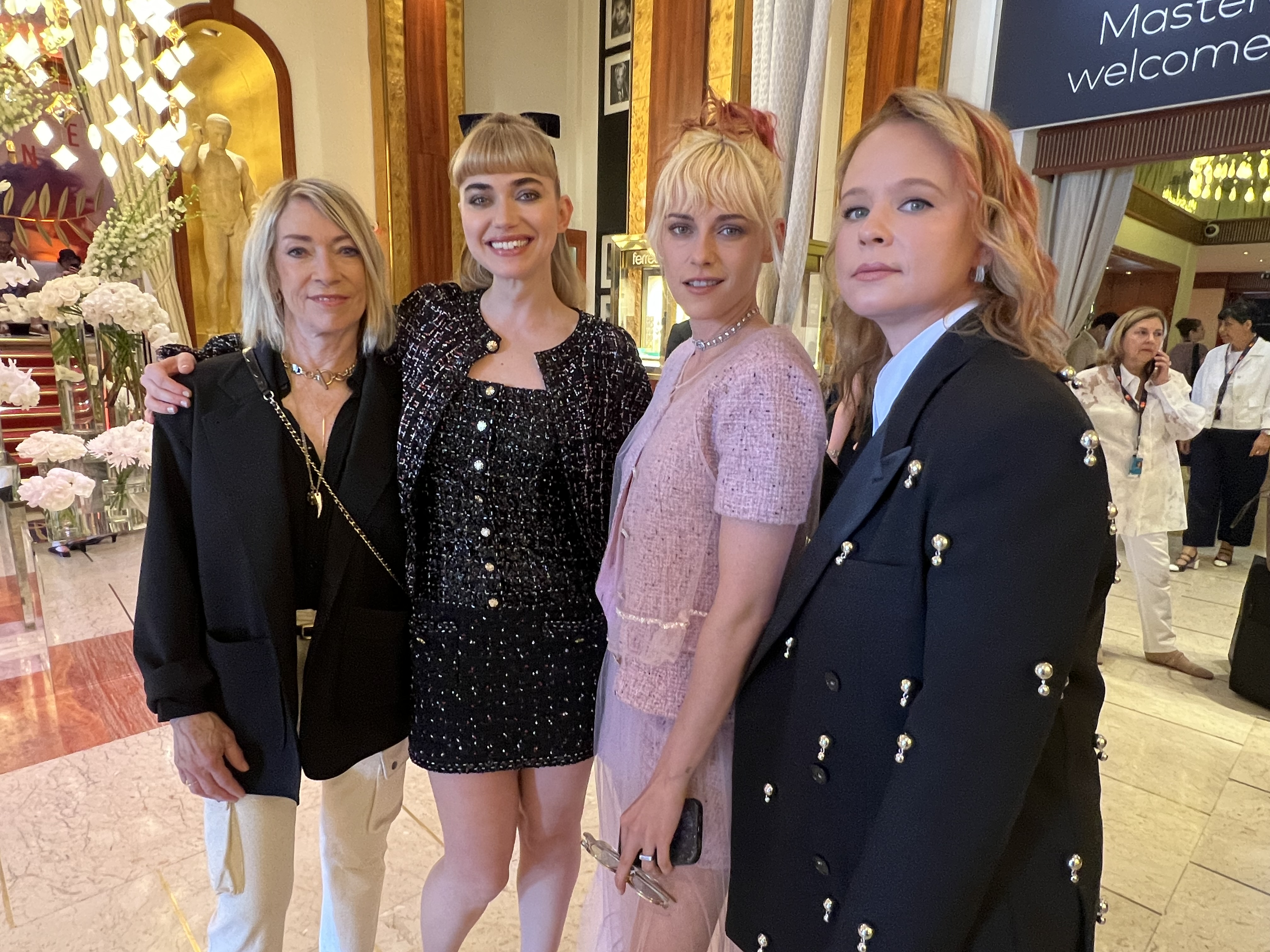
Kim Gordon, Imogen Poots, Kristen Stewart, and Thora Birch before the red carpet in Cannes

The Chronology of Water had its world premiere at the 2025 Cannes Film Festival on May 16, 2025, and received a six and a half minute standing ovation. In August 2025, The Forge acquired the distribution rights to the film in the United States, releasing in limited theaters on December 5, 2025, before expanding to a wider release on January 9, 2026. Les Films du Losange released the film earlier in France on October 15, 2025, and British Film Institute released the film later in the United Kingdom and Ireland on February 6, 2026.

== Reception ==
On the review aggregator website Rotten Tomatoes, 90% of 103 critics' reviews are positive, with an average rating of 7.1/10. The website's consensus reads: "Navigating a journey of emotional healing with impressive fluidity, Kristen Stewart's feature directorial debut is ably shouldered by Imogen Poots' bracingly naturalistic performance." Metacritic, which uses a weighted average, assigned the film a score of 78 out of 100, based on 28 critics, indicating "generally favorable" reviews.

Umnia El-Neil of Obscurae praised the film’s refusal to portray Lidia Yuknavitch as a “Perfect Victim,” noting its seamless navigation through fragmented memories and powerful performances from Imogen Poots and Jim Belushi. Tim Grierson of Screen Daily highlighted the film’s intimate 16mm aesthetics and Poots’ raw portrayal, while noting that its persistent tone of pain can at times feel repetitive, despite Stewart’s strong directorial instincts and a resonant, hopeful conclusion. Pavel Snapkou of Showbiz by PS offered a more mixed assessment, acknowledging the film’s emotional intensity and stylistic ambition while pointing out its uneven pacing.

=== Accolades ===
Award / Festival	Date of ceremony	Category	Recipient(s)	Result	Ref.
Cannes Film Festival	24 May 2025	Un Certain Regard	Kristen Stewart	Nominated	
Cannes Film Festival	24 May 2025	Camera d'Or	Kristen Stewart	Nominated	
Miskolc International Film Festival	13 September 2025	Emeric Pressburger Prize	The Chronology of Water	Nominated	
Miskolc International Film Festival	13 September 2025	Adolf Zukor Award	The Chronology of Water	Won	
Deauville American Film Festival	13 September 2025	Revelation Prize	The Chronology of Water	Won	
Deauville American Film Festival	13 September 2025	Grand Prize	Kristen Stewart	Nominated	
Savannah Film Festival	31 October 2025	Rising Star Director Award	Kristen Stewart	Won	
Valladolid International Film Festival	1 November 2025	Golden Spike	The Chronology of Water	Nominated	
IndieWire Honors	1 December 2025	Maverick Award	Kristen Stewart	Won	
Astra Film Awards	January 9, 2026	Best Indie Feature	The Chronology of Water	Nominated	
Astra Film Awards	January 9, 2026	Best First Feature	The Chronology of Water	Nominated	
