= A Man and His Dog =

- Directed by: Francis Huster
- Written by: Francis Huster; Murielle Magellan; Cesare Zavattini
- Based on: Umberto D. by: Cesare Zavattini; Vittorio De Sica
- Produced by: Jean-Louis Livi
- Starring: Jean-Paul Belmondo; Jean Dujardin; Hafsia Herzi; Daniel Prévost; Francis Huster; Pierre Mondy
- Cinematography: Vincent Jeannot
- Edited by: Luciana Reali
- Music by: Philippe Rombi
- Distributed by: Océan Films
- Release dates: 13 November 2008 (Sarlat Film Festival); 14 July 2009 (France)
- Running time: 109 minutes
- Country: France
- Language: French
- Budget: $7.4 million
- Box office: $3.1 million

A Man and His Dog (Un Homme et Son Chien) is a 2008 French film directed by French filmmaker Francis Huster, starring Jean-Paul Belmondo, based on the 1952 film Umberto D. directed by Vittorio De Sica, and written by Cesare Zavattini.

This was Jean-Paul Belmondo's first film in seven years following his recovery from a stroke and his final movie role before his death in 2021.

== Plot ==
Charles is a retiree who lives in a maid's room in the house of his lover, a rich widow. He is forced out onto the street with his dog after the widow decides to marry again and breaks off their relationship. With no home and no way to make money, they wander the streets of Paris.

== Cast ==
- Jean-Paul Belmondo as Charles
- Hafsia Herzi as Leila
- Julika Jenkins as Jeanne
- Francis Huster as Robert
- Max von Sydow as The Commander
- Jean Dujardin
- José Garcia
- Michèle Bernier
- Daniel Prévost
- Françoise Fabian
- Pierre Cassignard
- Cristiana Reali
- Tchéky Karyo
- Pierre Mondy
- Antoine Duléry
- Charles Gérard
- Patrick Bosso
- Jean-Luc Lemoine
- Barbara Schulz
- Sarah Biasini
- Bruno Lochet as Jean-Pierre
- Rachida Brakni
- Daniel Olbrychski
- Aurélien Wiik
- François Perrot
- Nicole Calfan
- Steve Suissa
- Robert Hossein
- Jean-Pierre Bernard
- Micheline Presle
- Emmanuelle Riva
- Jacques Spiesser
- Linda Hardy
- Caroline Silhol
