= Unlocked (2017 film) =

Action thriller film by Michael Apted

- Theatrical release poster
- Directed by: Michael Apted
- Written by: Peter O'Brien
- Produced by: Lorenzo di Bonaventura; Georgina Townsley; Erik Howsam; Claudia Bluemhuber
- Starring: Noomi Rapace; Orlando Bloom; Toni Collette; John Malkovich; Michael Douglas
- Cinematography: George Richmond
- Edited by: Andrew MacRitchie
- Music by: Stephen Barton
- Production companies: Di Bonaventura Pictures; SRA Productions; Silver Reel; Bloom; Lipsync Productions
- Distributed by: Lionsgate (Note: Released under Lionsgate Premiere and Grindstone Entertainment Group in the U.S.)
- Release dates: May 5, 2017 (United Kingdom); September 1, 2017 (United States)
- Running time: 98 minutes
- Countries: United States; United Kingdom
- Language: English
- Box office: $4.7 million

Unlocked is a 2017 action thriller film directed by Michael Apted, written by Peter O'Brien, and starring Noomi Rapace, Orlando Bloom, Michael Douglas, John Malkovich and Toni Collette. It was Apted's final film before his death in 2021. It was released in the United Kingdom on May 5, 2017, by Lionsgate.

== Plot ==
After a Paris operation fails on her watch, Central Intelligence Agency interrogation officer Alice Racine works undercover at a community centre in London. The area is known for Islamic extremism, and she passes on intel to the security services, including MI5 Intelligence Chief Emily Knowles. Racine's former station chief and mentor Eric Lasch tells her she should not feel guilty for the Paris deaths and needs to get back into the field. The CIA and MI5 learn that radical imam Yazid Khaleel plans a biological attack using Marburg virus on an American target on British soil in collaboration with American-born Islamic convert David Mercer. Frank Sutter, an officer from the CIA's London Station, tells Racine she has from Europe Division Chief Bob Hunter to help them interrogate and break Khaleel's captured courier, Lateef.

In a hotel, Racine interrogates Lateef and coaxes the message he is to deliver to Mercer's representative. Before divulging the details of the message to Sutter, she receives a call from her handler, Ed Romley, who confusingly gives her the same mission brief as Sutter. Realising she has been tricked, Racine attempts to remove Lateef from their custody, but he dies during a gunfight. She retreats to Lasch's apartment, but operatives attack, and Racine witnesses Lasch's death. She escapes to a safe house owned by Lasch and apprehends burglar Jack Alcott, who is in the process of robbing the apartment. Restraining him in the bedroom, she contacts Hunter and Romley, who, despite claiming to believe her, per protocol, send SCO19 officers to apprehend her. After fighting two of the officers and being tasered, she is saved by Alcott and the two escape. When Alcott reveals he is a former Royal Marine who served in the Iraq War, Racine reluctantly allows him to accompany her. Racine seeks the help of Amjad, a friend and client from the community centre.

She and Alcott confront Khaleel in a Moroccan restaurant, where he confesses he no longer believes in the radical extremism he promotes. Though he has given the courier a stand down order, Khaleel anticipates that Mercer will still proceed with the attack. While following an associate of Lateef, Racine discovers Alcott is working with Sutter, and the two fight; Racine escapes after Alcott is killed by an aggrieved third party. Racine approaches Knowles, who agrees to help Amjad stand in as the courier to meet with Mercer's representative. Knowles reveals to Racine that intelligence from the French DGSI suggests senior parties in the CIA allowed the Paris attack to take place, as one of the victims killed in the bombings was a CIA whistle blower. Romley's team track the bullets used in the killing of their men who apprehended Lateef to an AT308C sniper rifle, which is revealed to have been checked out of a Metropolitan Police armoury by corrupt MI5 operative John Wilson. Wilson, a part of the team providing cover for Knowles operation, guns down his fellow operatives, injures Knowles but fails to kill Racine. Amjad is killed in the crossfire.

Racine heads to a meeting point organized by Sutter, where Lasch is not only alive but conspires with him. Racine kills Sutter, and, after a brief struggle, Lasch escapes. Racine tracks him to a warehouse outside of Wembley Stadium, where a sold-out game of American football is due to be played. Lasch reveals he wants the biological attack to occur; the visiting Americans will transport the virus back home and force the US Government to take the threat of biological warfare seriously. After shooting Wilson, Racine and Lasch engage in a brief fight, after which he falls to his death and Racine disarms the virus canisters. Knowing that Mercer will flee to Syria, Hunter instructs her to intercept him en route. As Mercer is about to meet with a contact in Prague, Racine cuts a deep incision into his groin, opening his femoral artery, killing him. Hunter meets with Racine and welcomes her back to active duty.

== Cast ==
- Noomi Rapace as Alice Racine, a CIA interrogation officer
- Orlando Bloom as Jack Alcott, a small-time criminal and former soldier
- Toni Collette as Emily Knowles, an MI5 Intelligence Chief
- John Malkovich as Bob Hunter, CIA Europe Division Chief
- Michael Douglas as Eric Lasch, the former CIA Paris Station Chief and Racine's mentor
- Brian Caspe as Ed Romley, Racine's CIA handler
- Matthew Marsh as Frank Sutter
- Makram Khoury as Yazid Khaleel, a radical Islamic Imam and terrorist leader
- Michael Epp as David Mercer, a UK born Islamic convert and terrorist

In addition, Philip Brodie plays Wilson, a corrupt MI5 officer, while Tosin Cole plays Amjad, a young taxi driver and Racine's friend.

== Production ==
On September 23, 2010, Warner Bros. optioned the film, with Lorenzo di Bonaventura set to produce. On April 7, 2014, Noomi Rapace joined the cast, with Mikael Håfström set to direct. On September 7, 2014, Michael Douglas and Orlando Bloom joined the cast. On November 6, 2014, John Malkovich and Toni Collette joined the cast. During the production, Bloom accidentally broke Rapace's nose. Principal photography began on November 3, 2014, and ended on January 17, 2015.

== Release ==
The film was released in the United Kingdom on May 5, 2017, by Lionsgate. The film was released in the United States on September 1, 2017.

== Reception ==
On Rotten Tomatoes the film has an approval rating of 26% based on 57 reviews and an average rating of 4.3/10. The site's critical consensus states, "Unlocked strands an all-star cast in a spy thriller whose embrace of old-school formula might be refreshing if it weren't bogged down in genre clichés and a predictable plot." On Metacritic, the film has a score of 46 out of 100, based on 15 critics, indicating "mixed or average reviews".

Guy Lodge of Variety was not impressed with the film and wrote, "Years on from The Girl With the Dragon Tattoo, Noomi Rapace is still ready for action, though this middling thriller lags behind her." Stephen Dalton of The Hollywood Reporter called it a "functional contemporary spy yarn" that is "played way too straight" and "brings nothing fresh to the formula besides the minor innovation of dropping an action heroine into a male-dominated field". Simran Hans of The Guardian gave the film one out of five stars and wrote, "A cast of stars proves unable to lift this derivative, turgid terrorism thriller."
