= Dear Child =

- Liebes Kind
- Created by: Isabel Kleefeld; Julian Pörksen
- Based on: Liebes Kind, by Romy Hausmann
- Written by: Stefan Kolditz
- Directed by: Julian Pörksen
- Starring: Kim Riedle; Naila Schuberth; Sammy Schrein; Haley Louise Jones; Hans Löw; Seraphina Maria Schweiger; Justus von Dohnányi; Julika Jenkins
- Country of origin: Germany
- Original language: German
- No. of episodes: 6

Production
- Running time: 45–50 minutes
- Production companies: Constantin Film AG; Netflix

Original release
- Network: Netflix
- Release: 7 September 2023

Dear Child (original title: Liebes Kind) is a German crime drama miniseries directed by Isabel Kleefeld and Julian Pörksen, who also wrote the show. Based on Romy Hausmann's book, which was translated into English by Jamie Bulloch, the season premiered on September 7, 2023, on Netflix. The show won Best TV Movie or Miniseries at the 52nd International Emmy Awards.

== Synopsis ==
The series follows a woman who was imprisoned with two children for a long period. After managing to escape, the police begin an investigation into a disappearance case that occurred 13 years ago.

== Cast ==
- Kim Riedle as Jasmin “Jassy” Grass / Fake Lena Beck
- Naila Schuberth as Hannah, Lena's daughter
- Sammy Schrein as Jonathan, Lena's son
- Haley Louise Jones as Officer Aida Kurt
- Hans Löw as CID Officer Gerd Bühling
- Justus von Dohnányi as Matthias Beck, Lena's father
- Birge Schade as Nurse Ruth
- Seraphina Maria Schweiger as Officer Ines Reisig
- Julika Jenkins as Karin Beck, Lena's mother
- Özgür Karadeniz as Dr. Benedikt Hamstedt
- Juri Senft as Sven
- Christian Beermann as Lars Rogner
- Jeanne Goursaud as Real Lena Beck
- Christian Kerepeszki as Ulrich Grass, Jasmin's father

== Release ==
All six episodes of Dear Child were made available on Netflix on September 7, 2023. In the first two weeks after its release, the series stood out as the most-watched non-English language show on the platform, appearing in the top 10 in over 90 countries.

== Critical reception ==
The series received very positive reviews. Oliver Gaebel from Der Spiegel describes it as a "dark and thrilling series" that tackles uncomfortable questions, calling it a "police thriller of its own class". Julian Weinberger from Prisma highlights the intense first episode and the performance of Justus von Dohnányi but notes that the series becomes increasingly conventional, which may overshadow the overall strong impression.
