= The Nightmare (2015 German film) =

2015 German psychological horror drama film by Achim Bornhak

- Directed by: Achim Bornhak (as Akiz)
- Written by: Achim Bornhak (as Akiz)
- Produced by: Achim Bornhak (as Akiz); Amir Hamz; Simon Rühlemann; Christian Springer
- Starring: Carolyn Genzkow; Sina Tkotsch
- Cinematography: Clemens Baumeister
- Edited by: Achim Bornhak (as Akiz); Anna Nekarda; Philipp Virus
- Music by: Christoph Blaser; Steffen Kahles
- Release date: 10 August 2015 (LFF)
- Running time: 92 minutes
- Country: Germany
- Language: German

The Nightmare (German: Der Nachtmahr) is a 2015 German psychological horror- drama film directed by Achim Bornhak. The title and themes are inspired by the otherwise unrelated painting The Nightmare by Swiss painter Henry Fuseli. Rock musician Kim Gordon (Sonic Youth) has a cameo as an English poetry teacher.

== Plot ==
During a hot summer in Berlin, 17-year old Tina and her friends attend a late party at a public swimming pool. One of the girls tells Tina about a misshapen embryo shown to students during biology class. She takes a photograph of Tina with her smartphone to morph her into the picture. Later someone else also shows her someone getting run over by a car in a video on his smartphone. During the party, Tina is frightened by a bizarre creature in the forest and wants to go home. Once back at the car, Tina realizes she dropped her necklace which shattered on the street. As she gathers the fragments, a car runs her over.

A few moments later, Tina wakes up, apparently unhurt. A feeling of déjà-vu strikes her, and scenes similar to what happened before take place again, including getting in the car with her friends to leave and encountering Adam. However, her necklace is intact.

At home, Tina notices the strange creature from before raiding the kitchen fridge. She warns her parents and later security personnel to check whether there was an intruder in the home, but none of them find anything suspicious. Tina talks with her therapist, who advises her to approach and touch the creature. She follows his advice and discovers it seems to be real. Not only that, but they seem to have a strange physical sensory connection: whenever it hurts itself - or is hurt by others - Tina also experiences pain.

Tina starts to like the creature and feed it. One day, her parents discover to their horror that it sleeps next to her on her bed. They take her away and try to catch it with help from police officers and animal control specialists. As the creature is tranquilized, Tina also collapses in a coma. The creature is brought to a hospital for further investigation.

Tina wakes up and confronts her parents about the creature, but they have no idea what she is talking about. Back in school Tina is mocked and alienated by her former friends who all heard what happened and assume she is losing her mind. Despite the fact that they planned to throw a birthday party for her, she is not invited by them and her parents want to keep her at home, since her mental condition is so bad. She celebrates her 18th birthday at home with her parents but discovers they plan to send her to a mental hospital. Angry, she sneaks out that night, steals her parents' car, saves the creature from the hospital, and goes to the party.

At the party, she meets her friends and the boy she had an eye on the entire time. They kiss for the first time, but then other people notice the creature. As others try to harm it she goes over and defends him, but her parents - who also arrived at the scene - throw a stone sculpture at it.

The final scene shows Tina waking up in the back of the moving car, with the creature behind the wheel. She feels comforted and together they drive away.

== Cast ==
- Carolyn Genzkow - Tina
- Sina Tkotsch - Barbara
- Wilson Gonzalez Ochsenknecht - Adam
- Arnd Klawitter - Tina's father
- Julika Jenkins - Tina's mother
- Aram Arami - Rashid
- Michael Epp - police officer Schonrath
- Kim Gordon - English teacher

== Awards ==
The picture won the Youth Jury Prize and Oecumenical Jury Prize at the Max Ophüls Prize Film Festival (2016) and the award for Best Foreign Picture at the 12th Fantaspoa Festival in Brazil, in 2016.
