= Michael Epp =

German-British actor

- Born: September 19, 1983 (age 42); Konstanz, Baden-Württemberg, Germany
- Occupation: Actor
- Years active: 2005-present

Michael Epp (born 1983 in Konstanz) is a German born-British actor.

== Biography ==
Michael Epp grew up in Allensbach, Baden-Württemberg. He is the son of a German father and a British mother and was raised bilingually (German/English). In addition to his German nationality, he also holds British citizenship. After graduating from a business school in Konstanz in 2003, he initially completed a journalistic internship in the sports department of the Südkurier newspaper. Afterwards, he decided to pursue a career as an actor.

Between 2005 and 2007, Michael completed a three-year acting course at the HB Studio of Acting in New York's Greenwich Village. Upon completion of his training, he stayed in New York, where he lived and worked for a total of seven years. He mainly acted in theater at various smaller New York theaters, appeared in some short films, and also had minor television roles.

Since 2012, Epp has regularly appeared in German-language films and television shows, while also appearing in English-language productions and other international projects. His first television roles in Germany included the television film "Die Holzbaronin". In the second season of the television series "Weissensee", Michael won the 2014 German SAG Award in the category for "Best Ensemble," in which he played the young pianist Malte Ulbricht, alongside Katrin Saß, among others.

Michael's previous work included the horror thriller "Gefällt mir", the YouTube comedy "Kartoffelsalat – Nicht fragen!", the AKIZ film "The Nightmare", which won several awards at the Max Ophüls Prize film festival, the science fiction film "Wir sind die Flut", as well as the English-language and international productions "The Childhood of a Leader", with Bérénice Bejo and Robert Pattinson, "Collide", "Beyond Valkyrie: Dawn of the Fourth Reich", "Denial", "Another Mother's Son" with Jenny Seagrove as the leading actress, and Unlocked, alongside Michael Douglas, Orlando Bloom, and John Malkovich.

Epp also had episode roles in the German television series "Morden im Norden", "SOKO Wismar" and "SOKO Stuttgart". In the ARD series "In aller Freundschaft – Die jungen Ärzte" he appeared in three episodes in 2015. He has also appeared in several British television series and mini-series including "Crossing Lines", "War and Peace", "SS-GB". In the British-German crime series "The Mallorca Files", which aired in November 2019, Epp took on one of the lead roles. Epp also appeared in "Dunkelstadt" and "In Der Zürich-Krimi: Borchert und der fatale Irrtum". He was later featured in the 2024 action film "The Beekeeper" which starred Jason Statham and the 2025 Holocaust drama "The World Will Tremble" starring Oliver Jackson-Cohen and Jeremy Neumark Jones.

Michael has been married since 2015 and currently lives with his wife in Berlin.

== Discography ==
=== Television ===
- Springfield Story (2009)
- Weissensee (2013)
- Crossing Lines (2013)
- Binny und der Geist (2013–2014)
- Morden im Norden (2014)
- Stralsund: Kreuzfeuer (2015)
- SOKO Wismar (2015)
- SOKO Stuttgart (2015)
- In aller Freundschaft – Die jungen Ärzte (2015)
- War and Peace (2016)
- SS-GB (2017)
- SOKO Munich (2018)
- The Mallorca Files (2019)
- Ransom (2019)
- Dunkelstadt (2020)
- Der Zürich-Krimi: Borchert und der fatale Irrtum (2020)
- Souls (2022)
- Tom Clancy's Jack Ryan (2022)
- Ein Sommer auf Malta (2023)
- SOKO Donau (2025)

=== Film ===
- Die Holzbaronin (2013)
- Gefällt mir (2014)
- Kartoffelsalat – Nicht fragen! (2015)
- The Nightmare (2015)
- The Childhood of a Leader (2015)
- Wir sind die Flut (2016)
- Collide (2016)
- Beyond Valkyrie: Dawn of the 4th Reich (2016)
- Wann endlich küsst Du mich? (2016)
- Verleugnung (2016)
- Another Mother's Son (2017)
- Unlocked (2017)
- Spencer (2021)
- The Beekeeper (2024)
- The Brutalist (2024)
- The World Will Tremble (2025)
- The Chronology of Water (2025)
- The Dead Woman from the Way of St. James (2025)
