= Dora (case study) =

Patient of Sigmund Freud

Ida Bauer
- Born: 1 November 1882
- Died: 21 December 1945 (aged 63)
- Other name: Dora
- Known for: Freud's case study on hysteria

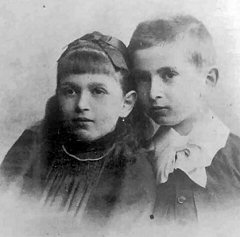
Ida Bauer (Dora) and her brother Otto

Dora is the pseudonym given by Sigmund Freud to a patient whom he diagnosed with hysteria, whom treated for about eleven weeks in 1900. Her most manifest hysterical symptom was aphonia, or loss of voice. Dora's real name was Ida Bauer (1882–1945); her brother Otto Bauer was a leading member of the Austro-Marxist movement.

Freud published a case study about Dora, Fragments of an Analysis of a Case of Hysteria (1905 [1901], Standard Edition Vol. 7, pp. 1–122; German: Bruchstücke einer Hysterie-Analyse).

== Case history ==
=== Family background ===
Dora lived with her parents, who had a loveless marriage, but one which took place in close concert with another couple, Herr and Frau K, who were friends of Dora's parents. The crisis that led her father to bring Dora to Freud was her accusation that Herr K had made a sexual advance to her, at which she slapped his face—an accusation which Herr K denied and which her own father disbelieved.

Freud himself reserved initial judgment on the matter, and was swiftly told by Dora that her father had a relationship with Frau K, and that she felt he was surreptitiously palming her off on Herr K in return. By initially accepting her reading of events, Freud was able to remove her cough symptom; but by pressing her to accept his theory of her own implication in the complex interfamily drama, and an attraction to Herr K, he alienated his patient, who abruptly finished the treatment after 11 weeks, producing, Freud reported bitterly, a therapeutic failure.

=== Dreams ===
Freud initially thought of calling the case "Dreams and Hysteria", and it was as a contribution to dream analysis, a pendent to his Interpretation of Dreams, that Freud saw the rationale for publishing the fragmentary analysis.

Ida (Dora) recounted two dreams to Freud. In the first:

[a] house was on fire. My father was standing beside my bed and woke me up. I dressed quickly. Mother wanted to stop and save her jewel-case; but Father said: 'I refuse to let myself and my two children be burnt for the sake of your jewel-case.' We hurried downstairs, and as soon as I was outside I woke up.

The second dream is substantially longer:

I was walking about in a town which I did not know. I saw streets and squares which were strange to me. Then I came into a house where I lived, went to my room, and found a letter from Mother lying there. She wrote saying that as I had left home without my parents' knowledge she had not wished to write to me to say Father was ill. "Now he is dead, and if you like you can come." I then went to the station and asked about a hundred times: "Where is the station?" I always got the answer: "Five minutes." I then saw a thick wood before me which I went into, and there I asked a man whom I met. He said to me: "Two and a half hours more." He offered to accompany me. But I refused and went alone. I saw the station in front of me and could not reach it. At the same time, I had the unusual feeling of anxiety that one has in dreams when one cannot move forward. Then I was at home. I must have been travelling in the meantime, but I knew nothing about that. I walked into the porter's lodge, and enquired for our flat. The maidservant opened the door to me and replied that Mother and the others were already at the cemetery.

Freud reads both dreams as referring to Ida Bauer's sexual life—the jewel case that was in danger being a symbol of the virginity which her father was failing to protect from Herr K. He interpreted the railway station in the second dream as a comparable symbol. His insistence that Ida had responded to Herr K's advances to her with desire—"you are afraid of Herr K; you are even more afraid of yourself, of the temptation to yield to him", increasingly alienated her. According to Ida, and believed by Freud, Herr K himself had repeatedly propositioned Ida, as early as when she was 14 years old.

Ultimately, Freud sees Ida as repressing a desire for her father, a desire for Herr K, and a desire for Frau K as well. When she abruptly broke off her therapy—symbolically just on 1.1.1901, only 1 and 9 as Berggasse 19, Freud's address—to Freud's disappointment, Freud saw this as his failure as an analyst, predicated on his having ignored the transference.

One year later (April 1902), Ida returned to see Freud for the last time, and explained that her symptoms had mostly cleared up; that she had confronted the Ks, who confessed that she had been right all along; but that she had recently developed pains in her face. Freud added the details of this to his report, but still viewed his work as an overall failure; and (much later) added a footnote blaming himself for not stressing Ida's attachment to Frau K, rather than to Herr K, her husband.

=== Freud's interpretation ===
Through the analysis, Freud interprets Ida's hysteria as a manifestation of her jealousy toward the relationship between Frau K and her father, combined with the mixed feelings of Herr K's sexual approach to her. Although Freud was disappointed with the initial results of the case, he considered it important, as it raised his awareness of the phenomenon of transference, on which he blamed his seeming failures in the case.

Freud gave her the name 'Dora', and he describes in detail in The Psychopathology of Everyday Life what his unconscious motivations for choosing such a name might have been. His sister's nursemaid had to give up her real name, Rosa, when she accepted the job because Freud's sister was also named Rosa—she took the name Dora instead. Thus, when Freud needed a name for someone who could not keep her real name (this time, in order to preserve his patient's anonymity), Dora was the name that occurred to him.

== Critical responses ==
=== Early polarisation ===
Freud's case study was condemned in its first review as a form of mental masturbation, an immoral misuse of his medical position. A British physician, Ernest Jones, was led by the study to become a psychoanalyst, gaining "a deep impression of there being a man in Vienna who actually listened to every word his patients said to him...a true psychologist". Carl Jung also took up the study enthusiastically.

=== Middle years ===
By mid-century, Freud's study had gained general psychoanalytic acceptance. Otto Fenichel, for example, cited her cough as evidence of identification with Frau K and her mutism as a reaction to the loss of Herr K. Jacques Lacan singled out for technical praise Freud's stressing of Dora's implication in "the great disorder of her father's world ... she was in fact the mainspring of it".

Erik Erikson, however, took issue with Freud's claim that Dora must necessarily have responded positively at some level to Herr K's advances: "I wonder how many of us can follow without protest today Freud's assertion that a healthy young girl would, under such circumstances, have considered Herr K's advances 'neither tactless nor offensive'."

=== Feminist and later criticisms ===
Second-wave feminism would develop Erikson's point, as part of a wider critique of Freud and psychoanalysis. Freud's comment that "This was surely just the situation to call up distinct feelings of sexual excitement in a girl of fourteen", in reference to Dora's being kissed by a "young man of prepossessing appearance", was seen as revealing a crass insensitivity to the realities of adolescent female sexuality.

Toril Moi was speaking for many when she accused Freud of phallocentrism, and his study of being a "Representation of Patriarchy"; while Hélène Cixous would see Dora as a symbol of "silent revolt against male power over women's bodies and women's language... a resistant heroine". (Catherine Clément, however, would argue that as a mute hysteric, in flight from therapy, Dora was surely far less of a feminist role model than the independent career woman Anna O.)

Even those sympathetic to Freud took issue with his inquisitorial approach, Janet Malcolm describing him as "more like a police inspector interrogating a suspect than like a doctor helping a patient". Peter Gay, too, would question Freud's "insistent tone... The rage to cure was upon him" and conclude that not only the transference but also his own countertransference needed more attention from Freud at this early stage of development of psychoanalytic technique.

== Literature and popular culture ==
=== Literature ===
- Dominik Zechner, 2020. "The Phantom Erection: Freud's Dora and Hysteria's Unreadabilities." In: Johanna Braun (ed.), Performing Hysteria. Leuven University Press, 2020. https://dx.doi.org/10.1353/book.78723.
- Lidia Yuknavitc, 2012. Dora: a Headcase. A novel based on the case, from a contemporary perspective sympathetic to Dora.
- Katz, Maya Balakirsky (2011). "A Rabbi, A Priest, and a Psychoanalyst: Religion in the Early Psychoanalytic Case History". Contemporary Jewry 31 (1): 3–24. doi:10.1007/s12397-010-9059-y
- Hélène Cixous, Portrait de Dora, des femmes 1976, Translated into English as Portrait of Dora Routledge 2004, ISBN 0-415-23667-3
- Charles Bernheimer, Claire Kahane, In Dora's Case: Freud-Hysteria-Feminism: Freud, Hysteria, Feminism, Second Edition, Columbia University Press, 1990
- Hannah S. Decker, Freud, Dora, and Vienna 1900, The Free Press, 1991
- Robin Tolmach Lakoff, James C. Coyne, Father Knows Best: The Use and Abuse of Power in Freud's Case of Dora, Teachers' College Press, 1993
- Jeffrey Moussaieff Masson: Against Therapy (Chapter 2: Dora and Freud),
- Patrick Mahoney, Freud's Dora: A Psychoanalytic, Historical, and Textual Study, Yale University Press 1996, ISBN 0-300-06622-8
- Gina Frangello, My Sister's Continent, Chiasmus Press, 2005
- Dan Chapman, "Adorable White Bodies", a short story based on Freud's case, interpreting it from the perspective of Ida Bauer.
- Dror Green, "Freud versus Dora and the transparent model of the case study", Modan Publishers, 1998.
- Jody Shields, The Fig Eater: A Novel, centered around the murder of Dora, with a character based on Ida Bauer.

=== Film ===
- Freud: The Secret Passion, director John Huston, 1962. Drama film with a heroine drawing from the Dora case.
- Sigmund Freud’s Dora, directors Anthony McCall, Andrew Tyndall, Jane Weinstock, and Claire Pajaczkowska, 1979. Experimental essayistic film putting the Dora case into debates about psychoanalysis and feminism.
- Nineteen Nineteen, director Hugh Brody, 1985. Dramatic fiction about a reunion of two patients of Freud, largely based on the Dora and Wolf-Man cases.
- Hysterical Girl, 2020, director Kate Novack. A contemporary feminist interpretation of the study.

=== Stage ===
- Portrait of Dora by Hélène Cixous, 1976
- The Dark Sonnets of the Lady: A Drama in Two Acts, by Don Nigro, 1992.
- Dora: A Case of Hysteria by Kim Morrissey, 1995

== See also ==
- Emma Eckstein
- Little Hans
- Rat man
- Steven Marcus
- Wolf man
