= Teo Gheorghiu =

Swiss-Canadian pianist and actor (born 1992)

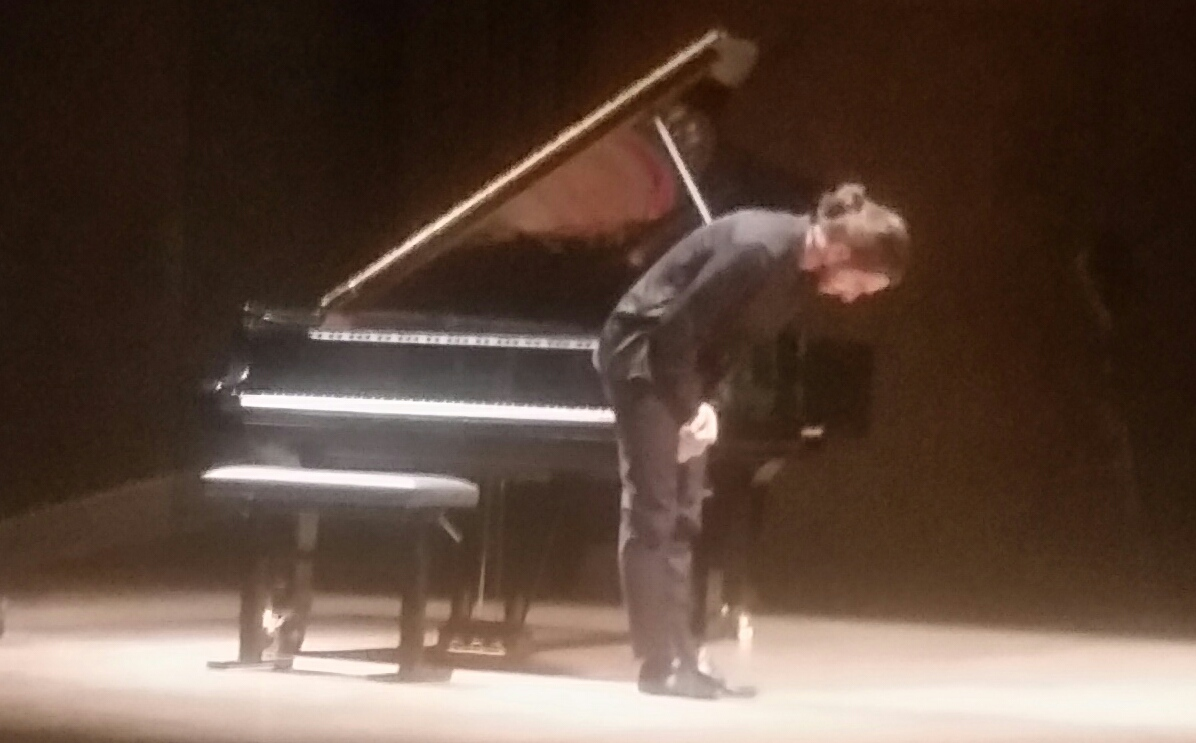

Background information
- Born: 12 August 1992 (age 34)
- Origin: Männedorf, Canton of Zurich, Switzerland
- Occupation: Classical pianist
- Instrument: Piano
- Website: teogheorghiu.net

Teo Gheorghiu (born 12 August 1992) is a Swiss-Canadian pianist.

== Life and career ==
Gheorghiu was born in Männedorf, Switzerland to a Romanian father and Canadian mother.

He started playing the piano at the age of 5 with Daniel Höxter. He studied with William Fong at the Purcell School, a music boarding school in London, from 2001 to 2010. He studied with Gary Graffman at the Curtis Institute of Music in Philadelphia, and at the Royal Academy of Music.

He won the ex-aequo joint first prize in the 12-years old and under section of the San Marino Piano Competition in 2004. In 2005 he was awarded first prize in the 10- to 13-year-old category of the International Franz Liszt Piano Competition in Weimar.

He made his first public concert performance in 2004 in Tonhalle, Zürich with Robert Schumann's Piano Concerto (where the footage for the final scene of the film was recorded live). In May 2007 his interpretation of Sergei Rachmaninoff's Piano Concerto No. 2 with the Orchester Musikkollegium Winterthur was acclaimed. The same year he gave concerts with the Tokyo New City Orchestra, the Zürich Chamber Orchestra (dir. Muhai Tang) and the Bern Symphony Orchestra. In 2008 he played concerts in Tokyo, Istanbul, London, Saint Petersburg and Potsdam. In 2009 he toured in Zürich, Gstaad, and also in Harrogate, Bad Saarow, Bucharest, Bonn, China and Taiwan.

In 2019, he participated in a Jeunesses Musicales Canada tour in Quebec, Canada, with the concert Body and Soul.

== Filmography ==
In 2004 he played the protagonist in 2006 film Vitus, released in 2006. For this role he was presented with an Undine Award in Baden, Austria for the best male debut in 2007.
