= Hawthorne Books =

American publishing company

- Founded: 2001
- Country of origin: United States
- Headquarters location: Portland, Oregon
- Publication types: books
- Official website: www.hawthornebooks.com

Hawthorne Books is an independent publisher founded in 2001 in Portland, Oregon, U.S., specializing in literary fiction and creative nonfiction original trade paperbacks.

== Authors ==
- Kristen Wiig has optioned the film rights for Monica Drake's Clown Girl.
- Lidia Yuknavitch, author of The Chronology of Water, won the 2012 PNBA Award and is shortlisted for the 2012 Oregon Book Award.
- Frank Meeink of Autobiography of a Recovering Skinhead was featured on WHYY's Fresh Air.
- Hawthorne's title The Well and The Mine by Gin Phillips won her the 2008 Barnes & Noble Discover Award. Penguin Press bought the rights to The Well and The Mine shortly after.
- Scott Nadelson won the Oregon Book Award and the Great Lakes Colleges Association Award for Saving Stanley in 2004.
- Hawthorne's rediscovery series celebrates American writers by bringing back to print titles by authors such as Richard Wiley, Lynne Sharon Schwartz, Tom Spanbauer and Toby Olson.
- Introductions to Hawthorne Books' writers are often written by esteemed authors including Wole Soyinka, Ursula Hegi, Chuck Palahniuk, A. M. Homes, Robert Coover, Fannie Flagg and Robin Givens.

== See also ==
- List of companies based in Oregon
