= Caverns (novel) =

Collaborative novel by Ken Kesey and creative writing class

- First edition
- Author: Ken Kesey
- Language: English
- Genre: Collaborative fiction
- Publisher: Penguin Books
- Publication date: 1989
- Publication place: United States
- ISBN: 0-14-012208-7
- OCLC: 20131987
- Dewey Decimal: 813/.54 20
- LC Class: PS3562.E924 C38 1990

Caverns is a 1989 novel written collaboratively as an experiment by Ken Kesey and a creative writing class that he taught at the University of Oregon. The cover of the book says it was written by O.U. Levon. The name of this supposed author, spelled backwards, is "novel U.O." (University of Oregon). The full list of authors is: Robert Blucher, Ben Bochner, James Finley, Jeff Forester, Bennett Huffman, Lynn Jeffress, Ken Kesey, Neil Lidstrom, H. Highwater Powers, Jane Sather, Charles Varani, Meredith Wadley, Lidia Yukman and Ken Zimmerman.

== Background ==
Though still a counterculture icon, by the 1980s Kesey had slowed his writing significantly. In 1988–89 he agreed to spend a year teaching a creative writing class at the University of Oregon. Kesey decided the best way to teach the course would be for the class of 13 graduate students to produce a novel as they assembled, twice a week, at Kesey's home.

Kesey set out two rules: first, the students could not discuss the plot of the novel with anyone outside of the class; second, for voting purposes Kesey comprised 50 percent of the class, a controlling majority, to prevent the class getting "drawn into a lot of democratic discussion", as he told an interviewer. The class soon developed a third rule: there could be no writing outside of class. All work was to be done collaboratively, to help prevent the novel from developing 13 different prose styles. Kesey described his role in the process as quarterback of a football team. The class successfully completed the book, which was published in December 1989.

== Plot ==
According to Kesey's "Introduction," the novel was inspired by a news clipping, an Associated Press story on October 31, 1964, entitled "Charles Oswald Loach, Doctor of Theosophy and discoverer of so-called 'SECRET CAVE OF AMERICAN ANCIENTS,' which stirred archaeological controversy in 1928."

The novel features Loach as its central character. Set in the 1930s, Loach is imagined as a convicted murderer (he killed a photographer to protect the secret of the cave) who is released from San Quentin Prison, in the custody of a priest, to lead an expedition to rediscover the cave.

The novel—described by The New York Times as Indiana Jones meets The Canterbury Tales—features a motley crew of characters: Father Paul, an unbalanced priest; Dr. Jocelyn Crane, an archaeologist; Loach's brother, a museum curator; publisher Rodney Makai and the "Blavatskian Makai sisters"; their African-American driver, Ned; and Juke and Boyle, World War I veterans still suffering the ill effects of mustard gas.

Most of the novel concerns the characters traveling together in a military vehicle to Utah where Loach says the cave is located. On their quest, they encounter frequent and various comic misadventures along the way.

== Composite novel ==
The idea of the composite novel or collaborative fiction was not new. In 1872 Harriet Beecher Stowe wrote a book Six of One by Half a Dozen of the Other with five other authors about three mismatched couples searching for their proper mates. At the turn of the century, a dozen authors, led by William Dean Howells, and including Henry James and Mary Eleanor Wilkins Freeman, collaborated to write The Whole Family (1908). Each author wrote a different chapter, taking the perspective of a different family member. Another famous composite novel was Naked Came the Stranger (1969), a book written by 24 journalists as a literary hoax; it was deliberately incoherent but full of sex to prove that any novel with sex sells.

The work of Kesey and his class departed from previous composite novels by having the thirteen class members and Kesey collaboratively write each sentence. Of the methodology, Alfred Bendixen wrote in The New York Times that "The book shows that a group of apprentice writers can collaborate and produce a highly readable tale in a relatively short period of time. But Caverns also reminds us - sometimes painfully - that the novel requires an individual voice, fully realized characters and a clear sense of time and place."

== Critical reception ==
Because of Kesey's attachment to the project, the book was widely reviewed in newspapers and magazines. Critics were generally intrigued by the book but ultimately critical of its shortcomings: noting in particular the lack of a coherent voice and a too-large cast of characters. Writing in the Los Angeles Times, Bob Sipchen noted, "Caverns is an amusing lark, full of weird characters and goofy plot twists. It was a sufficiently intriguing project to make The Mainstream Media swarm around Kesey again. But no one is calling Caverns literature."
