= Liane Hielscher =

German actress

- Born: 9 November 1935; Schweidnitz, Silesia, Germany
- Died: 26 January 2000 (aged 64); Bad Aibling, Bavaria, Germany
- Occupations: Stage actress Television actress Film actress
- Years active: 1961–1997

Liane Hielscher (German: [li.ˈaː.nə ˈhiːl.ʃɐ]; born Juliane Hielscher; 9 November 1935 - 26 January 2000) is a German actress.

== Life ==
Hielscher attended a business school and worked as an interpreter for three years. She took Joseph Offenbach's acting courses at the Deutsches Schauspielhaus, making her first appearance on stage at Theater Hof.

She played at Theater Münster from 1962 to 1964, and at theater 53 and Theater im Zimmer from 1964 to 1965. Then she played at the regional stage of Hannover and from 1966 to 1967 at Thalia Theater, from 1967 to 1968 at the Bayerisches Staatsschauspiel in Munich, from 1968 to 1970 at the Hebbel-Theater in Berlin. In the 1970 she started working freelance, appearing as a guest on several stages and playing in numerous tours.

In the 1970s and 80s, Hielscher mainly appeared on television. She started in Gestatten, mein Name ist Cox, then continued with Die seltsamen Methoden des Franz Josef Wanninger and SOKO 5113 and eventually appeared in Derrick and in Solange es die Liebe gibt. Moreover, she played supporting roles in films such as Edgar Reitz's Cardillac (1969), as well as main roles in Ula Stöckl's film Neun Leben hat die Katze (1968) and in Niklaus Schilling's The Woman Without a Body and the Projectionist. In 1988, she took a role in the American independent film Shuttlecock directed by Jerry R. Barrish. She also dubbed Majel Barrett's voice in the science-fiction series Star Trek (Raumschiff Enterprise in German).

Hielscher died in 2000 at the age of 64. She was buried at Stephanskirchen near Rosenheim in southern Bavaria.

== Autobiography ==
Hielscher wrote a book about her life and her illness which was published shortly before her death: Ein Star wollte ich werden, ich wurde ein Mensch. Leben mit Krebs (in German). Verlag Nymphenburger. 2000. ISBN 3485008400.

== Filmography ==
- 1961: Gestatten, mein Name ist Cox (television series, 1 episode)
- 1967: Dreizehn Briefe (television series, 1 episode)
- 1967: Großer Mann was nun? (television series, 1 episode)
- 1967: Midsummer Night
- 1967: Det største spillet
- 1968: Das Kriminalmuseum: Der Scheck (television series)
- 1968: Till the Happy End
- 1968: The Cat Has Nine Lives
- 1969: Cardillac
- 1970: Die seltsamen Methoden des Franz Josef Wanninger (television series, 1 episode)
- 1970: Angels with Burnt Wings
- 1971: Das Geld liegt auf der Bank
- 1971: Sie liebten sich einen Sommer
- 1972–1973: Sonderdezernat K1 (several episodes)
- 1974: Hamburg Transit (television series)
- 1974: Okay S.I.R.: Einspielungen (television series)
- 1975: Derrick: Ein Koffer aus Salzburg
- 1975–1979: PS (television series)
- 1976: Notarztwagen 7 (television series)
- 1977: Derrick: Yellow He
- 1977: MS Franziska (television series)
- 1979: Tatort: Schweigegeld
- 1979: Fallstudien (television film)
- 1980: Nirgendwo ist Poenichen (television series)
- 1980: The Weavers (television film)
- 1981: Polizeiinspektion 1 (television series, 1 episode)
- 1981: Ein Fall für zwei, episode 4: Todfreunde
- 1983: Die Supernasen
- 1983: The Woman Without a Body and the Projectionist
- 1984: Ein irres Feeling
- 1987: Derrick: Koldaus letzte Reise
- 1987: Moselbrück (television series)
- 1987: Weiberwirtschaft (television series)
- 1989: The Spirit
- 1989: Shuttlecock
- 1990: Derrick: Höllensturz
- 1991: Hausmänner
- 1992: Sylter Geschichten (television series)
- 1994: Derrick: Gib dem Mörder nicht die Hand
- 1996: Immer Ärger mit Arno (television series)
- 1996: Solange es die Liebe gibt (television series)
- 1997: Dr. Stefan Frank – Der Arzt, dem die Frauen vertrauen (television series)
