= Tonio Arango =

German actor

- Born: 31 January 1963 (age 63); East Berlin, East Germany
- Occupation: Actor
- Years active: 1993-present

Tonio Arango (born 31 January 1963) is a German actor.

Born in East Berlin, Arango is the son of a German mother and a Colombian father and grew up in Wilmersdorf, then part of West Berlin, surrounded by East Germany, with his brother Sascha Arango, now a screenwriter. He went on to train for an acting career at the Max Reinhardt Seminar, a drama school in Vienna, from 1986 to 1990, and left without graduating. He then became a successful stage actor, appearing in Hamburg, Bochum, Düsseldorf, Cologne, Zürich, and Vienna.

In the Oskar Roehler film No Place to Go (2000) Arango played Ronald alongside Hannelore Elsner. In 2007, he had his first notable television role as a Nazi lawyer, Heinrich von Gernstorff, in March of Millions, with Maria Furtwängler.

== Selected appearances ==
- Back to Square One (1994) as Banker
- No Place to Go (2000) as Ronald
- March of Millions (2007) as Count Gernstorff
- Der Kriminalist (2007) "Totgeschwiegen"
- Alarm für Cobra 11 – Die Autobahnpolizei: Highway Maniac (2000) as Jochen 'Joe' Fischer
- Buddenbrooks (2008) as Kistenmaker
- SOKO Wismar: Spieglein, Spieglein (2010) as Tom Dahlmann
- Cologne P.D.: Waschen, schneiden, töten (2011) as Jesco Brandt
- Shakespeares letzte Runde (2016) as Othello
- Cologne P.D.: Der Mann mit der Geige (2017) as Dr Felix Dambrosy
- SOKO Wismar: Die Freuden des Alters (2017) as Dr Alexander Immel
- Großstadtrevier: Der Master (2018) as Sky Masterssohn
- Spy City (2020) as August Froben
- The Phoenician Scheme (2025) as Assassin #1 (Desert)
