= Hannelore Elsner =

German actress (1942–2019)

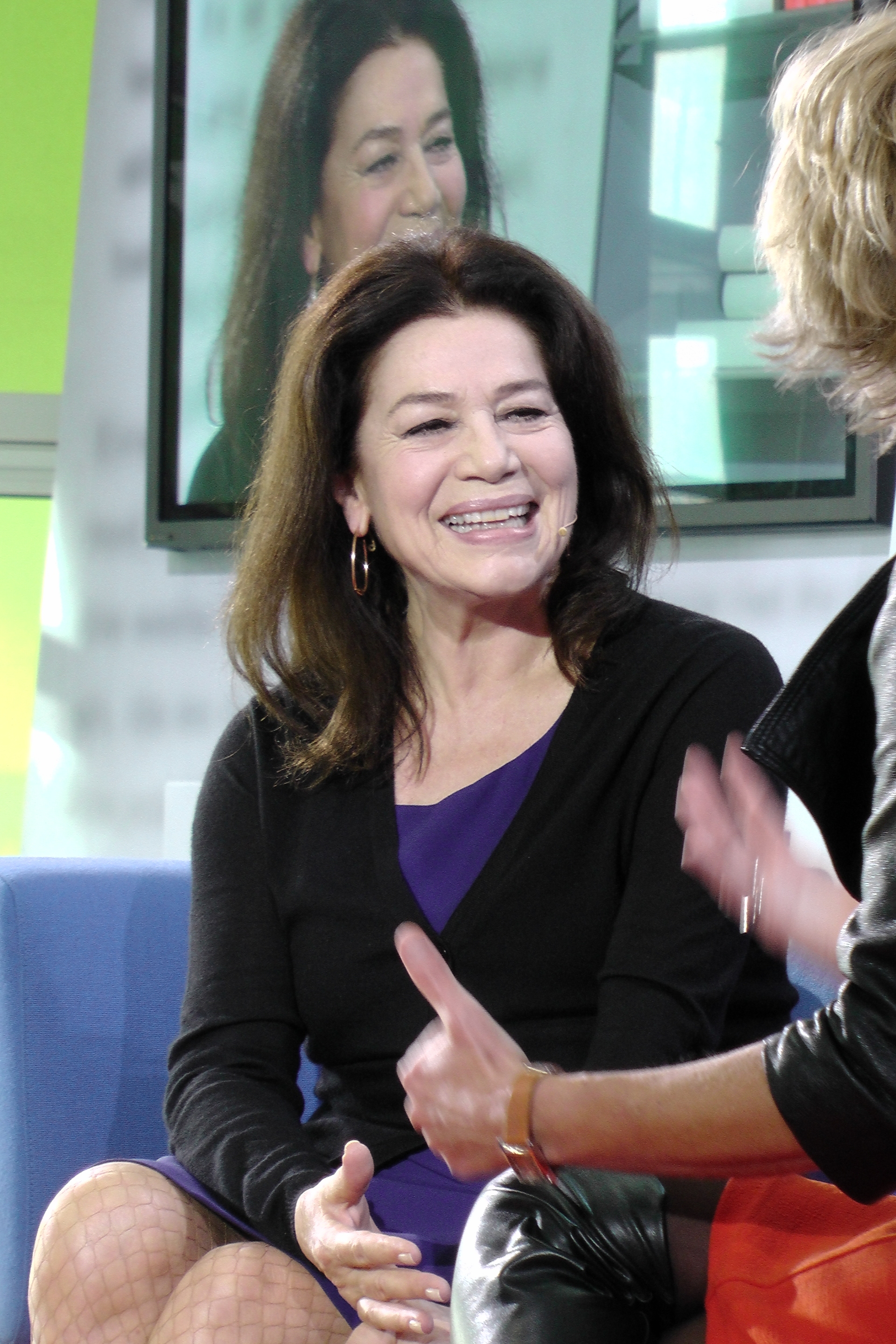
- Elsner in 2011
- Born: Hannelore Elstner; 26 July 1942; Burghausen, Bavaria, Germany
- Died: 21 April 2019 (aged 76); Munich, Germany
- Occupation: Actress
- Years active: 1959–2019
- Spouses: Gerd Vespermann (1964–1966); Alf Brustellin (1970s–1981); Uwe B. Carstensen (1993–2000)
- Awards: Bavarian Film Awards; Deutscher Filmpreis

Hannelore Elsner (German: [ˈhanəloːʁə ˈɛlsnɐ]; born Hannelore Elstner; 26 July 1942 – 21 April 2019) was a German actress with a long career in television and film. She first performed on stage in Munich, and later starred in popular films and television series such as Die Schwarzwaldklinik (The Black Forest Clinic), and as the lead character, Inspector Lea Sommer, in the series Die Kommissarin. She was recognized internationally for her lead role in the 2000 film Die Unberührbare (No Place to Go), shown at the Cannes Film Festival.

== Career ==
She was born Hannelore Elstner in Burghausen on 26 July 1942. Her five-year-old brother was killed in an air raid at the end of the Second World War. Her father died from tuberculosis when she was eight.

After finishing drama school in Munich, she was engaged at the Munich theatres Münchner Kammerspiele and Kleine Komödie am Max II. She was the first to appear nude on stage at the Kammerspiele.

Elsner appeared in her first film, Alt Heidelberg (Old Heidelberg), in 1959 at age 17. She was discovered for more serious acting by Edgar Reitz, who cast her alongside Elke Sommer for a lead role in the 1973 film Die Reise nach Wien (Trip to Vienna), her first role outside Germany. Later she starred in films and TV series such as Die Schwarzwaldklinik (The Black Forest Clinic). Elsner is remembered for the title role, Inspector Lea Sommer, in the German detective series Die Kommissarin which aired on public television in 66 episodes from 1994 to 2006. She was the first woman to play an inspector in a television series.

Elsner achieved international recognition for her lead role in the 2000 film Die Unberührbare (No Place to Go), which recounts the last days in the life of a writer, based closely on the life of Gisela Elsner, who died by suicide in 1992. The black-and-white film was written and filmed by Gisela Elsner's son, Oskar Roehler. It was a German entry for the Cannes Film Festival, and received three film awards. Elsner's last completed film was Cherry Blossoms and Demons by Doris Dörrie; Dörrie said that Elsner was a great adventurer who threw herself into every role and her life with curiosity, dedication and bravery ("Für mich war Hannelore Elsner eine große Abenteuerin, die sich mit Neugier, Hingabe und Tapferkeit in jede Rolle und in ihr Leben gestürzt hat".)

Elsner also participated in audio plays and read audio books. She worked in an association exhorting people not to forget the Holocaust. She wrote her memoirs in 2011, titled Im Überschwang: Aus meinem Leben (In Exuberance: From My Life), which describe in detail how she grew up in Bavarian provincial surroundings and recount tragic episodes from her childhood.

== Awards ==
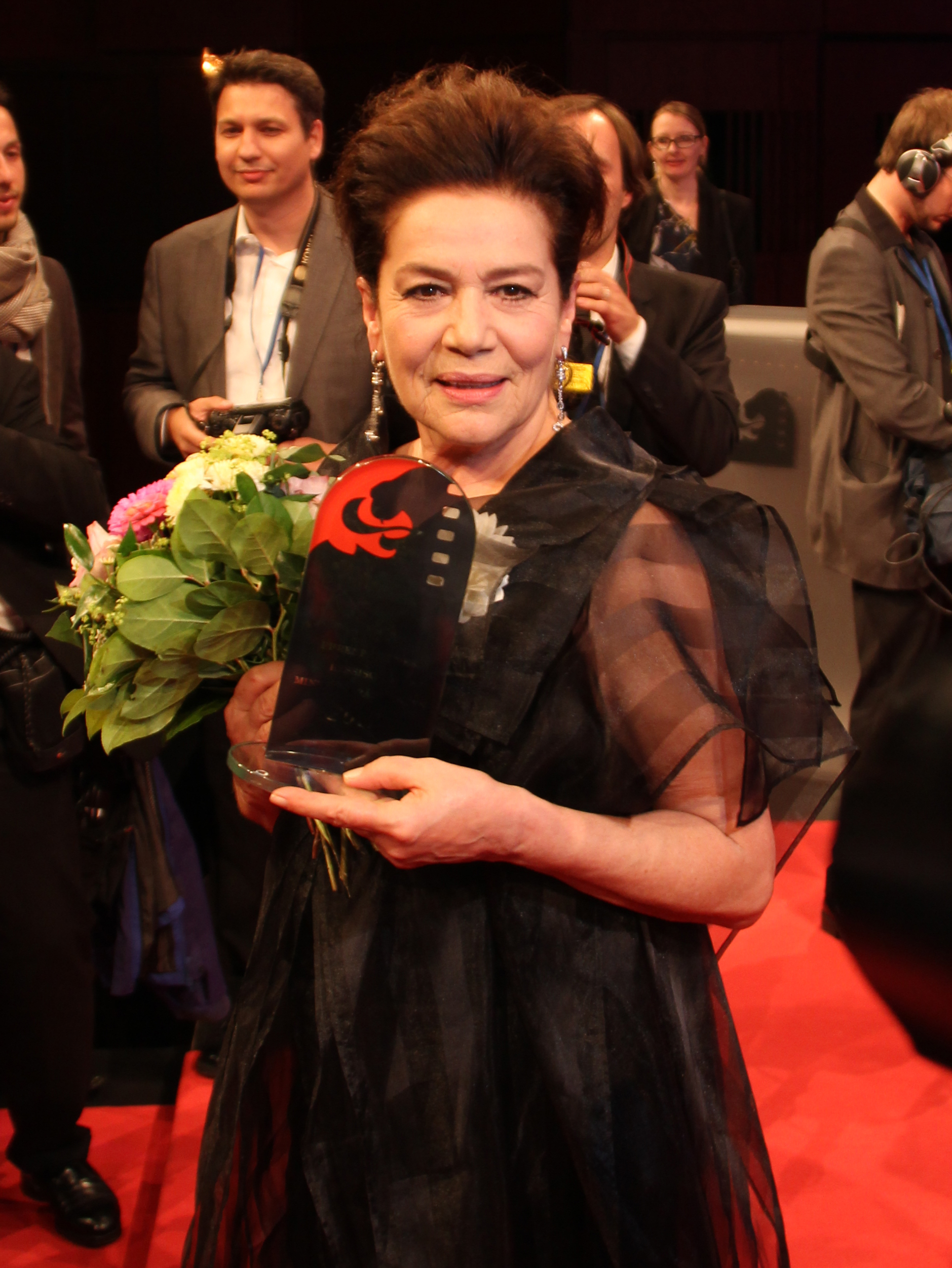
Elsner in 2012

For her title role in Die Unberührbare (No Place to Go), Elsner was awarded the Deutscher Filmpreis (German Film Award) in the category Best Actress, the Deutscher Kritikerpreis (German Critics' Prize) and the 2000 Bayrischer Filmpreis (Bavarian Film Award). In 2003, she won the Best Actress category for My Last Film, directed by Oliver Hirschbiegel, at the German Film Awards. In 2005, she received the German Order of Merit for her campaign against AIDS. In 2006, she was awarded the Bavarian Film Award for her life's work.

== Personal life and death ==
Elsner was married three times: to the actor Gerd Vespermann from 1964 to 1966, to the director Alf Brustellin from the 1970s until his death in 1981, and to Uwe B. Carstensen from 1993 until their divorce in 2000. In 1981, she had a son with the director Dieter Wedel.

She died of cancer in a clinic in Munich on 21 April 2019. Hanns-Georg Rodek, in an obituary for Die Welt, described her as "a national institution ... wild, seductive and independent" ("eine nationale Institution ... wild, verführerisch und unabhängig"). The broadcaster BR changed their programming in her honour, to show films that she had appeared in as well as an interview.

== Filmography ==
Films in which Elsner appeared include:

- Old Heidelberg (1959), as Helene
- Und sowas nennt sich Leben (1961), as Ulla
- The Girl with the Narrow Hips (1961), as Yusha
- Stahlnetz: Spur 211 (1962, TV series episode), as Edith Tirfelder
- The Endless Night (1963), as Sylvia Stössi
- Tomfoolery in Zell am See (1963), as Sylvia Brückner
- An Alibi for Death (1963), as Hanne Wasneck
- Glorious Times at the Spessart Inn (1967), as Johanna
- Zur Hölle mit den Paukern (1968), as Geneviève Ponelle
- Christoph Kolumbus oder Die Entdeckung Amerikas (1969, TV film), as Anacoana
- Student of the Bedroom (1970), as Brigitte
- Gentlemen in White Vests (1970), as Susan
- Willi Manages the Whole Thing (1971), as Constanze
- The Stuff That Dreams Are Made Of (1972), as Irina
- ...aber Jonny! (1973), as Monika Winkler
- Excerpts from the Life of a Good-For-Nothing (1973), as The Countess
- Trip to Vienna (1973), as Marga Kroeber
- Challenge to White Fang (1974), as Jane LeClerq
- Die schöne Marianne (1975, TV series, 13 episodes), as Marianne Ruaux
- Berlinger (1975), as Maria / Marlit
- Grete Minde (1977), as Trude Minde
- The Tailor from Ulm (1978), as Anna Berblinger
- Der Sturz (1979), as Alissa Kristlein
- The Green Bird (1980), as Dr. Renate Winter
- Who's Crazy, Doc? (1982), as Dorothea von Schög
- Solo Run (1983, TV film), as Zimra Steffin
- Man Without Memory (1984), as Dr. Essner
- A Kind of Anger (1984, TV film), as Adele Sanger
- Mary Ward (1985), as Mary Ward
- Parker (1985), as Jillian Schelm
- Kaminsky (1985), as Nicole Kaminsky
- Operation Dead End (1985), as Dr. Hoppe
- Please, Let the Flowers Live (1986), as Yvonne Duhamel
- Lorentz & Söhne (1988, TV series, 12 episodes), as Katharina Haltermann
- The Black Forest Clinic (1987–1988, TV series, 6 episodes), as Maria Rotenburg
- Noch ein Wunsch (1989, TV film), as Brigitte
- The Eighth Day (1990), as Mrs. De Vries
- Death Came As a Friend (1991, TV film), as Judith
- Long Conversation with a Bird (1992, TV film), as Polly
- Cliffs of the Death (1993, TV film), as Rita Freymuth
- Die Kommissarin (1994–2006, TV series, 66 episodes), as Lea Sommer
- Blutige Spur (1995, TV film), as Maria Dennert
- Butterfly Feelings (1996, TV film), as Marie-Luise Wendt
- A Girl Called Rosemary (1996, TV film), as Marga Hartog
- Andrea and Marie (1998, TV film), as Andrea
- Kai Rabe gegen die Vatikankiller (1998), as Hilde Strassburger
- The Cry of the Butterfly (1999), as Susanne Thiess
- No Place to Go (2000), as Hanna Flanders
- Ende der Saison (2001, TV film), as Waltraud
- Beloved Sister (2002, TV film), as Rita
- My Last Film (2002), as Marie
- Eine Liebe in Afrika (2003, TV film), as Denise
- Der Seerosenteich (2003, TV film), as Puppe Mandel
- Red and Blue (2003), as Barbara Bärenklau
- Woman Driving, Man Sleeping (2004), as Dr. Sue Süssmilch
- Alles auf Zucker! (2004), as Marlene Zuckermann
- The Rose Gardener (2004, TV film), as Beatrice Shaye
- Die Spielerin (2005, TV film), as Polina Sieveking
- You Told Me, You Love Me (2006), as Johanna Perl
- Not All Were Murderers (2006, TV film), as Ludmilla Dimitrieff
- Smoke Signs (2006), as Annabella Silberstein
- Vivere (2007), as Gerlinde von Habermann
- The Visible and the Invisible (2007), as Maria Döbereiner
- War and Peace (2008, TV miniseries), as Countess Rostova
- Cherry Blossoms (2008), as Trudi Angermeier
- My Heart in Chile (2008, TV film), as Laura Hansen
- Zeiten ändern dich (2010), as Mother
- Hanni & Nanni (2010), as Mrs. Theobald
- The Last Patriarch (2010, TV film), as Ruth Buchleitner
- Keep Lying, Darling (2010, TV film), as Martha Ebinghaus
- Alles Liebe (2010, TV film), as Irma Bergner
- Promising the Moon (2011), as Marga Baumanis
- Don't You Believe It! (2012), as Daisy
- Jesus Loves Me (2012), as Silvia
- The Whole Shebang (2014), as Ingrid
- Tour de Force (2014), as Irene
- Better Than Nothing (2014), as Wally
- To Life! (2014), as Ruth Weintraub
- Besondere Schwere der Schuld (2014, TV film), as Agnes Barner
- A Grand Farewell (2015, TV film), as Ella
- Family Party (2015), as Renate
- Hanna's Sleeping Dogs (2016), as Ruth Eberth
- Wunderlich's World (2016), as Liliane Wunderlich
- 100 Things (2018), as Renate Konaske
- Cherry Blossoms and Demons (2019), as Trudi Angermeier
- Club der einsamen Herzen (2019, TV film), as Kiki
- Lang lebe die Königin (2020, TV film), as Rose Just (final film role)
