= Eight Hundred Times Lonely =

2019 film directed by Anna Hepp

- Directed by: Anna Hepp
- Written by: Anna Hepp
- Produced by: Anna Hepp
- Starring: Edgar Reitz, Anna Hepp
- Cinematography: Oliver Freuwörth, Elí Roland Sachs, Christian Scholz
- Edited by: Julia Suermondt
- Distributed by: déjà-vu film
- Release dates: 6 September 2019 (2019 Venice Film Festival); 23 October 2019 (Hof International Film Festival, Germany); 5 March 2020 (GER)
- Running time: 84 minutes
- Country: Germany
- Language: German

Eight Hundred Times Lonely or 800 Times Lonely - One Day with German Filmmaker Edgar Reitz (German: 800 Mal Einsam - Ein Tag mit dem Filmemacher Edgar Reitz) is a 2019 German documentary film directed by Anna Hepp about the German film director Edgar Reitz, who is known for his series of films called Heimat and was also a representative of the New German Cinema movement. Anna Hepp's film celebrated its world premiere at the 2019 Venice Film Festival in the Venice Classics section.

== Synopsis ==
The up-and-coming director Anna Hepp meets the old and renowned German director Edgar Reitz in Eight Hundred Times Lonely. Discussions between the two filmmakers take place at a historic cinema called Lichtburg, located in the Ruhr-city Essen, and at the nearby Lake Baldeney (Baldeneysee). Or Edgar Reitz talks about his life, his view of art and his sometimes philosophical viewpoint.

Edgar Reitz reflects soberly, precisely and also critically on his life, in which not himself but always his art is at the centre of attention, his path in life, the difficulty of breaking away from his conservative and catholic parents' house and embarking on an artistic career, the creation of the Oberhausen Manifesto, the risk of using the memories of his family and himself as material for films, the criticism of German television and the problems with television editors, who, despite his many years of professional experience, impose 11 script versions on him for his six-part film Heimat 3: A Chronicle of Endings and Beginnings (Heimat 3). With the remark: "This program is too good for the people." (translated from German)

Edgar Reitz also reports on his professional and private failure after the film The Tailor from Ulm (Der Schneider von Ulm), which did not run successfully in German theaters in 1978 after a negative review in the news magazine Der Spiegel. After this failure and the separation from his wife at the same time, the demoralized Reitz thought about making a new start in his career at the age of 46. In this difficult phase he remembered his home, the Hunsrück. And as a result, the first part of the international well known and multiple award-winning film series Heimat was created in 1984.

In addition to Edgar Reitz, filmmaker Anna Hepp herself stands in front of the camera and in the centre of the film, as a connoisseur and admirer of Reitz and his life's work. At the beginning of the film she says, that she cannot separate the director and his films. Every feature film character that Reitz developed would be projected onto him by Hepp. In the course of the film plot the title of the film is also explained. The two filmmakers Reitz and Hepp look from the stage into the empty cinema hall of the Lichtburg in Essen and ponder together on the cinema culture and the situation of the audience during a film screening. Reitz feels that in a cinema—by this he means the Essen Lichtburg cinema—eight hundred lonely people would become a community through the discussed screening. So, "Eight hundred times lonely".

== Style ==
In between the black and white- and colour-filmed conversations between Anna Hepp and Edgar Reitz at various locations, their stories and moments without dialogue, excerpts from Reitz's film works Lust for Love (Mahlzeiten), Heimat and Susanne tanzt (short film) are interspersed every now and then. In addition, detail, slow- and fast motion shots and pictures accompanied by instrumental music are added. Some members of the film team also occasionally appear in staged and documentary sequences in front of the camera or take part in the conversation between Anna Hepp and Edgar Reitz.

Filmmaker Hepp explains the style of her film in an interview with the cultural newspaper Müchner Feuilleton: "Making precisely this filmmaking visible was [...] important from the very beginning for my portrait of Edgar Reitz, who stands for filmmaking. That's where his passion lies, all his work is concentrated on making, less on his person. That's what I wanted to show, of course, as a proxy. That brings us together: the love and passion for filming. That's an important aspect for me when you make a film about a filmmaker as a filmmaker. In addition, I wanted to 'play', experiment, try something out, in order to create contrasts and variety, the unexpected, over a length of 84 minutes." (translated from German)

== Production ==
The film portrait of Edgar Reitz was produced by Anna Hepp's Startup company Portrait Me with financial support from the German film fundings Film- und Medienstiftung NRW, Filmförderungsanstalt (FFA) and the Kuratorium junger deutscher Film. The shooting took place from 29 September to 1 October 2017 in the cinema Lichtburg, located in Essen and near Lake Baldeney.

== Release ==
The world premiere of Eight Hundred Times Lonely was screened at the 2019 Venice Film Festival on 6 September 2019. The German premiere followed on 23 October 2019 at the Hof International Film Festival. The film will have a theatrical limited release in Germany on 5 March 2020.

== Accolades ==
2019: Nomination for the Venezia Classici Award in the category Best Documentaries on cinema at the 76th Venice International Film Festival for Anna Hepp
