= Thor Kunkel =

German writer

Thor Kunkel, a German author, was born in Frankfurt am Main on 2 September 1963. Kunkel claims to have spent his youth associating with drug friends and American soldiers stationed in the then West Germany. In 1981, on a scholarship to the United States, he enrolled in the creative writing programme of the San Francisco Art Institute.

Following his return to West Germany, Kunkel joined the staff of advertising agency Young & Rubicam, then in 1988 joined the Swiss GGK in London, England. After marrying Dutch artist Gerda Bakker, he moved to Amsterdam in 1992 and re-joined Young & Rubicam as creative director, quitting in 1996 to take up directing and writing. He now lives in Switzerland and the Netherlands. His first novel, The Blacklight-Terrarium (1999), won him a major German literary prize. His 2011 novel Subs has been adapted for film with the title Herrliche Zeiten by the director Oskar Roehler.

== Biography ==
Thor Kunkel's debut novel Das Schwarzlicht-Terrarium (lit. 'The Black Light Terrarium') - awarded with the Ernst Willner Prize in 1999 - layers a variety of tragic-comical stories around synthetic drugs, disco and the American dream imported by G.I.s on the historical reality of the 1970s. In his dialogues, Kunkel mixes the jargon of "Hessian" hicks with G.I. slang to create a highly literary gutter language. Referring to Kunkels first novel, Martin Walser wrote appreciatively: "The author seems to be a naming obsessive, a virtuoso of disgust, a master show-off, a sexual fundamentalist."

Kunkel's second novel, A Letter to Hanny Porter (original title: Ein Brief an Hanny Porter), set on Hawaii, is a dialogue-driven show down between four characters on the down side of the "American dream." The German TV station NDR compared the novel to a "Brechtian didactic play." After a play version by the Leipzig Schauspielhaus in 2002, the novel, set in Hawaii, was produced by MDR as a radio play starring Andrea Sawatzki in a lead role.

Kunkel's third novel Final Stage (original title: Endstufe), funded by a grant from the Stiftung Preußische Seehandlung, was controversially discussed in the international press even before its official publication date. In preparing the novel, Kunkel researched deep into a secret collection of Nazi erotic films known as Sachsenwald films. Its publication led to a fierce scandal and a lasting rift between the author and the German feuilleton. On April 15, 2004, in Die Zeit, Iris Radisch called the novel "the avant-garde of the biotechnical age. (...)The Berlin Banana Republic in NS Design." The FAZ journalist Dirk Schümer, on the other hand, found on May 12, 2004, in SWR'S program Büchertalk: "Kunkel's provocation consists in the fact that the Third Reich is portrayed from an internal perspective. That means that the people who describe it to us are Nazis. [...] I read this book with great pleasure in a very quick time and found it a monstrous, horror-movie-like inside perspective of a system that is otherwise only ever portrayed from the perspective of the victims." Nevertheless, Kunkel never found Final Stage's reception justified. The Guardian journalist Luke Harding noted that Final Stage's portrayal of pornography viewing among senior Nazi officials was accurate, in spite of the fact that Nazi Germany officially banned pornography.

Kunkel's fourth novel Kuhl's cosm (original title: Kuhls Kosmos), was published in 2007. The well-known critic Volker Weidermann called the novel "sensationally funny" in the FAS. The Ärzte singer Bela B. also publicly commented on Kunkel's novel: "Rarely felt so good bad." Kuhl's Cosm as sequel of his first novel describes the dark side of disco culture and locates its beginnings in the criminal red-light milieu. Frankfurt DJ Sven Väth – father of German techno – also commented on these beginnings in the Süddeutsche, April 14, 2002: "You have to imagine it something like in Thor Kunkel's Frankfurt novel 'The Black Light Terrarium,' very semi-sexy and proletarian."

In 2010, Kunkel followed up with the utopian grotesque Schaumschwester, in which Kunkel describes the conspiracy of cybernetic organisms. The taz praised the novel, calling it "compressed and restrained."

From a 2009 radio play Subs written for WDR, Kunkel developed the novel of the same name, which was published in 2011. In his novel, Kunkel depicts the return of slavery in a private setting. A progressive-minded couple decides to settle "Balkan people" (meaning refugees) on their property in Berlin. The Austrian Standard wrote on June 3, 2011: "Thor Kunkel is and remains the German grand master of trash." The philosopher Peter Sloterdijk also commented on this novel: "Resist the beginnings!", Ovid once said. Thor Kunkel sets against it: Investigate the beginnings!" Spiegel magazine of December 12, 2011, considered this statement both a "knighthood and a declaration of honor."

In his memoir Wanderful - My New Life in the Mountains, published in 2014, Kunkel describes his two-year-lasting sabathical in the Valais Alps. The text is a mixture of autobiographical vignettes and essays on natural philosophy, that unfold within the framework of a high-alpine hiking guide. Cicero magazine, No. 4 of April 2014 subsequently called Kunkel "the last outlaw of German literature."

In addition to his literary work, Thor Kunkel is increasingly active as a director. Kunkel spent the spring of 2015 as writer in residence at Monte Verità in Ticino, where his philosophical treatise Mir blüht ein stiller Garten was written. The book was published in 2016.

== Controversy ==
Shortly before going to press in spring of 2004, the publishing house Rowohlt discontinued its collaboration with Kunkel. The publisher Alexander Fest succinctly justified this by citing differences over content and aesthetic issues. As a result, Final Stage was published a few months later in an abridged version by Eichborn Berlin. The central thread of the fictional plot is built around the production and trade of blue flicks (pornographic films) conducted by employees of the "SS-Hygiene Institute Berlin" in North Africa. Although the so-called Sachsenwald movies are part of the collection of the renowned media expert Werner Nekes (*1944 - †2017), the authenticity of these films has been questioned, but later clearly confirmed.

Rowohlt's rejection resulted in a discussion in many German newspapers and magazines. While opinions differed widely on whether Rowohlt's move was justified, the novel itself was criticized in most media for different reasons. Opinions differed widely on the quality of the text. The Frankfurter Allgemeine Sonntagszeitung, on the other hand, called the novel a "brilliantly written, tremendously interesting manuscript by one of the best German authors of the younger generation." A "profoundly cynical attempt" to exorcise the horrors of German history "with a wild round of disgust and at the same time to whitewash them by painting a broad picture of Allied crimes," was of another critic's verdict of the same the Frankfurter Allgemeine Zeitung. In August 2020, Kunkel published an unabridged version of his scandalized novel Final Stage, which contains the so-called discarded passages cited by Der Spiegel in their entirety. The difference from the 2004 first edition is exactly 132 pages. The media diary Open for Shooting (original title:Zum Abschuss freigegeben) was published at the same time. Kunkel describes here how his work was censored by his former publisher and how he was disavowed by the German media over a considerable period of time.

Thor Kunkel emigrated to Switzerland in 2009. Since then he regards himself as an exiled author. His website bears the title: Displaced person like.

== Personal creed ==
"I am the drop of cold air in the global warming of German literature." Thor Kunkel, 2021

== Bibliography ==
Novels

- Das Schwarzlicht-Terrarium (2000) ISBN 3-499-22646-4
- Ein Brief an Hanny Porter (2000) ISBN 3-499-22678-2
- Endstufe (2004) ISBN 3-8218-0753-9
- Kuhls Kosmos (2008) ISBN 3-927734-41-1
- Schaumschwester (2010) ISBN 3-88221-690-5
- Subs (2011) ISBN 3453266927
- Wanderful - Mein neues Leben in den Bergen, Eichborn-Verlag, Köln, 2014 ISBN 978-3-8479-0568-4
- Das Wörterbuch der Lügenpresse: Deutsch – Lügenpresse, Lügenpresse – Deutsch. Kopp Verlag, Rottenburg 2020, ISBN 978-3-8644-5733-3.
- Endstufe. Die unzensierte Originalfassung. Edition Kunkelversum, Berlin 2020, ISBN 978-3982078939.
- Zum Abschuss freigegeben. Kopp Verlag, Rottenburg 2020, ISBN 978-3864457715.

Foreign licenses were sold to the following countries: Italy, Czech Republic and Turkey.

Radio dramas

- Ein Brief an Hanny Porter (MDR, 2001) (Bearbeitung: Steffen Moratz)
- Verfallsobjekt Nr. 1 (Deutschlandradio Kultur, 2005)
- Subs (WDR, 2009)
- Eine abenteuerliche Geschichte (Exkl. Mercedes-Hörbuch, 2014)

Short Stories

- Restlicht. In: A. Enderlein (Hrsg.): Weihnachten und andere Katastrophen. Ullstein Tb, 1998, ISBN 3-548-24493-9.
- Das Doppelleben der Amöbe. In: Robert Schindel (Hrsg.): Klagenfurter Texte, Ingeborg-Bachmann-Wettbewerb 1999. Piper, München 1999, ISBN 3-492-04161-2.
- Das Maß aller Dinge. In: Schicke neue Welt. Ullstein Taschenbuch Verlag, 1999, ISBN 3-548-24625-7.
- Die Ampel-Theorie. Rowohlt Taschenbuch Verlag, Reinbek 2000, ISBN 3-499-22669-3.
- Gefrierpunkte. In: Eiszeit – 25 Autoren schlottern vor Kälte. Aufbau Verlag, 2000, ISBN 3-7466-1631-X.
- Botschaften an den Stoffwechsel. In: Annika – 33 Erzählungen von deutschen Autoren. Schneekluth, 2002, ISBN 3-7951-1814-X.
- Das entomologische Gastmahl. In: Bloß keinen Grießbrei an Heiligabend. 2010, ISBN 978-3-550-08831-5.
- Skrupulanten und Posaunisten. In: Bunter Staub – Ernst Jünger im Gegenlicht. Matthes & Seitz, Berlin 2008, ISBN 978-3-88221-725-4.
- Biologiestunde. In: Letzte Worte – Die besten Einsendungen zum Agatha Christie-Preis. Scherz Verlag, 2003, ISBN 3-502-51957-9.

Essays

- Vorwort. In: Angelo Petrella: Nazi Paradise. PulpMaster Verlag, 2009, ISBN 978-3-927734-43-2.
- Quo vadis, deutscher Sackabski? In: Akif Pirinçci, Andreas Lombard (Hrsg.): Attacke auf den Mainstream. Manuscriptum Verlag, 2014, ISBN 978-3-944872-09-4.
- Occupy the Feuilletons! In: Titel-Magazin. 2011.
- Schicksalsmächtige Klubmoral. In: Titel-Magazin. 2013.
- Helden fürs Geld. In: Titel-Magazin. 2012,

== Secondary literature ==
- Julia Garraio: Porn, rape and the fall of the Third Reich: Thor Kunkel's Endstufe. In: Isabella Capeloa Gil, Adriana Martins (Hrsg.): Plots of war: Modern Narratives of Conflict (= Culture & Conflict. 2). Walter de Gruyter, Berlin/ Boston 2012, ISBN 978-3-11-028304-4.
- Ingo Irsigler: "In Porno veritas. Amen". Zu Formen und Funktionen des Pornographischen bei Charlotte Roche und Thor Kunkel. In: Hans-Edwin Friedrich, Sven Hanuschek, Christoph Rauen (Hrsg.): Pornographie in der deutschen Literatur: Texte, Themen, Institutionen. Belleville, München 2016, ISBN 978-3-946875-01-7, S. 167–183.
- Peter McIssac: Dystopian Visions in Thor Kunkel's Endstufe. In: Visions of Tomorrow: Science and Utopia in German Culture. ISSEI, Helsinki 2008, ISBN 978-3-89487-613-5, S. 34–43.
- Ingo Irsigler: "In Porno veritas. Amen". Zu Formen und Funktionen des Pornographischen bei Charlotte Roche und Thor Kunkel. In: Hans-Edwin Friedrich, Sven Hanuschek, Christoph Rauen (Hrsg.): Pornographie in der deutschen Literatur: Texte, Themen, Institutionen. Belleville, München 2016, ISBN 978-3-946875-01-7, S. 167–183.
- Dagmar Herzog: Sex after Fascism: Memory and Morality in Twentieth-Century-Germany. Princeton University, Princeton/ Oxford 2005, ISBN 0-691-11702-0.
- Stuart Taebner (Hrsg.): Contemporary German Fiction: Writing in the German Republic. Cambridge University Press, Cambridge/ New York u. a. 2007, ISBN 978-0-521-86078-9.
- Katrien Jacobs: Netporn: DIY web culture and sexual politics. Kapitel 4: "Eros in Times of war". Rowman & Littlefield, Lanham 2007, ISBN 978-0-7425-5431-3, bzw. ISBN 978-0-7425-5432-0.
- Franz Trautmann: Nazikiffer: Eine mitteleuropäische Vergangenheitsbewältigung. Books on Demand, Norderstedt 2008, ISBN 978-3-8370-7325-6.
- Frank Bösch, Constantin Goschler (Hrsg.): Public History: Öffentliche Darstellungen des Nationalsozialismus jenseits der Geschichtswissenschaft. Campus Verlag, Frankfurt am Main 2009, ISBN 978-3-593-38863-2.
- Christian Schertz, Thomas Schuler (Hrsg.): Rufmord und Medienopfer: Die Verletzung der persönlichen Ehre. Ch. Links Verlag, Belin 2007, ISBN 978-3-86153-424-2.

== Awards (selection) ==
as a writer

- Ernst-Willner-Preis / Ingeborg-Bachmann-Wettlesen 2. Platz(1999)
- Nomination Bestes Hörspiel, Kategorie: Beste Unterhaltung (2002)
- Stipendium Preußische Seehandlung (2003)
- Aufenthaltsstipendium der Sylt-Quelle (2004)
- Autorenstipendium der Senatsverwaltung Berlin(2005)
- Nominationen Kurt-Lasswitz-Preis + Deutscher Science-Fiction-Preis(2006)

as creative director
During his "industry work" as a "TV art director" and advertising film director, Kunkel received the following awards, among others:

- N.Y. Film Festival
- ADCN-Award (Silver Lamp)
- Cannes Lion (Poster Award) 1994
- Clio
- Creative Circle
- Creston
- Cyber Lion
- D&AD, DMSA
- Art Directors Club New York
- Graphis Poster
- Epica
- Eurobest (viermal)
- London International Advertising Festival
