= Anna Hepp =

German filmmaker, artist and photographer

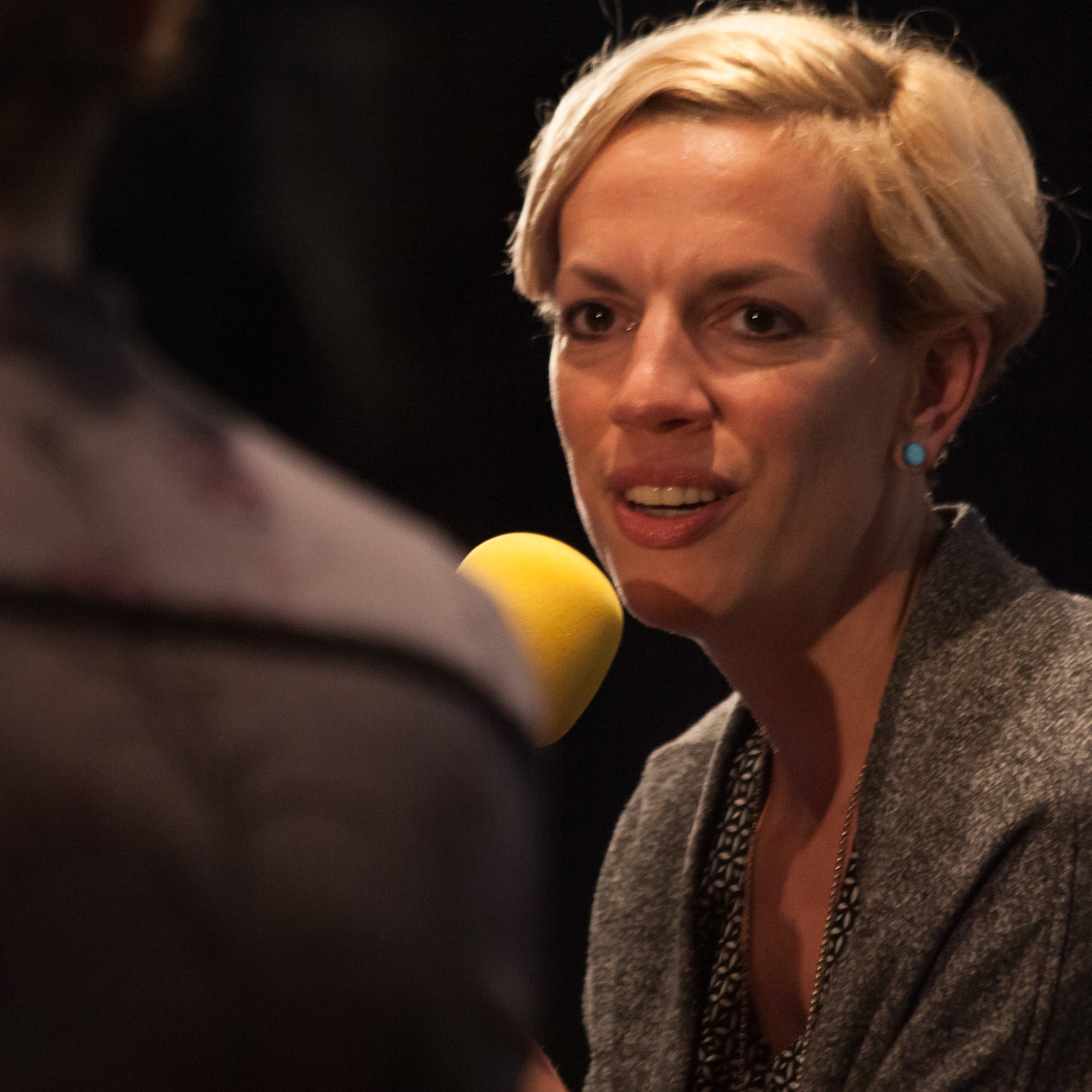
- Hepp during an interview in 2015
- Born: 1977 (age 48–49); Marl, Germany
- Occupations: Filmmaker, artist, photographer
- Years active: 2007–present

Anna Hepp (born 1977 in Marl, North Rhine-Westphalia) is a German filmmaker, artist and photographer.

== Life and work ==
From 1996 to 1998 Hepp studied education and philosophy at the University of Essen. In 1998 she started an apprenticeship as a photographer, which she completed with a certificate in 2001.

Since 2001 Hepp has been working as a freelance and employed photographer. In 2003 she began her studies of audiovisual media at the Academy of Media Arts Cologne, which she finished with distinction in 2009. Her diploma film A Day and an Eternity (Ein Tag und eine Ewigkeit) received numerous festival awards, among others in China.

Hepp's second film, the documentary Turkish Kraut (Rotkohl und Blaukraut) celebrated its world premiere at the 61st Berlin International Film Festival in 2011. In 2012, her short film portrait I would prefer not to (Ich möchte lieber nicht) about Hilmar Hoffmann, the former Head of the Frankfurt Department of Culture, was released. In the same year, Anna Hepp also received a scholarship from the Goethe Institute in Porto Alegre, Brazil, as Artist in Residence.

Since 2015 Hepp has been working on the realisation of an artistic film portrait about the famous German film director Edgar Reitz. The completed project, the documentary film entitled Eight Hundred Times Lonely (800 Mal Einsam – ein Tag mit dem Filemaker Edgar Reitz), celebrated its world premiere on 6 September 2019 at the 76th Venice International Film Festival and was nominated for the Venezia Classici Award in the category Documentary on Cinema.

In 2016, Hepp founded the production company Portrait Me with a grant. In recent years, this has developed into a team of artists from various artistic disciplines, with whom workshop-based, intergenerational and sometimes inclusive projects have been devised for senior citizens and children to learn digital skills through joint artistic work. Portrait Me was nominated for the 2021 German Demography Award (Deutschen Demografie Preis) in the Diversity category, among others.

From 2021, Hepp worked on the realization of a documentary feature film about single parents, which was funded by the German Film- und Medienstiftung NRW and is entitled The Soloists (Die Solisten).

In 2023, Hepp was a member of the festival jury for the documentary film competition at the Austrian film festival Der Neue Heimatfilm.

Anna Hepp lives in Cologne.

== Filmography (selection) ==
- 2009: A Day and an Eternity (Ein Tag und eine Ewigkeit) (documentary short film), (director, cinematographer, screenwriter, editor and producer)
- 2011: Turkish Kraut (Rotkohl und Blaukraut) (documentary film), (director, concept)
- 2012: I would prefer not to (Ich möchte lieber nicht) (documentary short film), (director, screenwriter, editor and producer)
- 2015: To the old People of Porto Alegre (short documentary), (director, cinematographer and screenwriter)
- 2019: Eight Hundred Times Lonely (800 Mal Einsam – ein Tag mit dem Filmemacher Edgar Reitz) (documentary film), (director, screenwriter and producer)
- 2026: The Soloists (Die Solisten) (documentary film), (director, screenwriter and producer)

== Awards and nominations (Selection) ==
- 2009: Beijing Student Film Festival - Jury Award for A Day and an Eternity
- 2010: FIKE – Festival Internacional de Curtas Metragens de Évora (Portugal) - Prize Best international documentary film for A Day and an Eternity
- 2010: International Shortfilm Festival Hamburg (Germany) - Audience award in the category German Competition for A Day and an Eternity
- 2010: Landshuter Kurzfilmfestival (Germany) - Jury Award for the best documentary film for A Day and an Eternity
- 2011: Internationales Frauen* Film Fest Dortmund+Köln - Nomination for the award for female picture designers for A Day and an Eternity
- 2011: Internationales Frauen* Film Fest Dortmund+Köln Nomination for the award for female picture designers for Turkish Kraut
- 2013: International Shortfilm Festival Hamburg - Nomination for the Jury award in the category German Competition for I would prefer not to
- 2019: 76th Venice International Film Festival - Nomination for the Venezia Classici Award in the category Best Documentary on Cinema for Eight Hundred Times Lonely
