= Mademoiselle de Scuderi =

1819 novella by E. T. A. Hoffmann

Mademoiselle de Scudéri
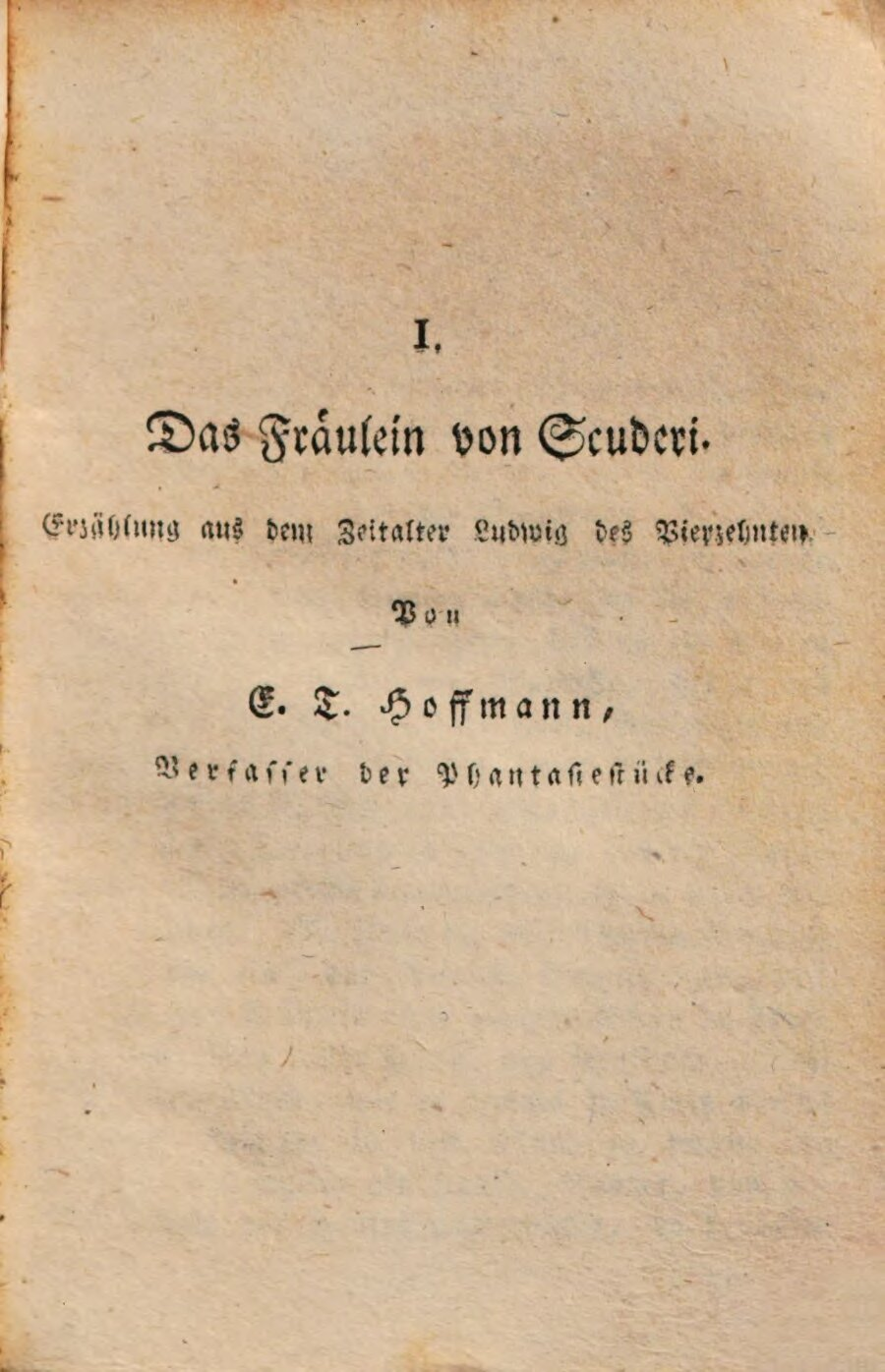
- Title page in the Taschenbuch der Liebe und Freundschaft gewidmet
- Author: E. T. A. Hoffmann
- Original title: Das Fräulein von Scuderi
- Language: German
- Publisher: Wilmans
- Publication date: 1819
- Publication place: Frankfurt
- Pages: 120

Mademoiselle de Scuderi. A Tale from the Times of Louis XIV (German: Das Fräulein von Scuderi. Erzählung aus dem Zeitalter Ludwig des Vierzehnten) is an 1819 novella by E. T. A. Hoffmann which was first published in the Yearbook for 1820. Dedicated to Love and Friendship (German: Taschenbuch für das Jahr 1820. Der Liebe und Freundschaft gewidmet). It was later included in the third volume of Hoffmann's collection The Serapion Brethren.

The 1819 edition was a commercial and critical success and led to Hoffmann's becoming a popular and well-paid author. Mademoiselle de Scuderi is regarded as one of the first examples of crime fiction and one of Hoffmann's best works, not only because of its plot and descriptions of life, places, and people in late 17th-century Paris but also because of the different levels of interpretation that it allows.

== Plot ==
The action takes place in Paris during the reign of King Louis XIV. The city is under siege by what is presumed to be an organised band of thieves whose members rob citizens of costly jewellery in their homes or on the street. Some of the street victims are simply rendered unconscious by a blow to the head, but most are killed instantly by a deliberate dagger thrust to the heart. The murder victims are mostly wealthy lovers who are on their way to meet their mistresses with gifts of fine jewellery.

These are not the only terrible crimes plaguing Paris (a series of bizarre poisonings is described in detail), and to combat them the King establishes a special court, the Chambre Ardente, whose sole purpose is to investigate them and punish their perpetrators. The president of the Chambre, La Régnie (probably based on Gabriel Nicolas de la Reynie), however, is consistently thwarted in his attempts to stop the evildoing, and in his blind zeal and frustration he is seduced to commit acts of terror and brutality. Because of his failures and cruelty, he quickly earns the hatred of those he was appointed to protect.

In a poem exalting the King, the lovers of Paris exhort him to do something for their safety. Mademoiselle de Scudéri (the historical Madeleine de Scudéry), who is present when this appeal is presented, counters jokingly with the following verse:

Un amant, qui craint les voleurs,
N'est point digne d'amour.

A lover who is afraid of thieves
Is not worthy of love.

The elderly de Scudéri is a well-known poetess who lives in a modest house in Paris on the rue Saint Honoré by the grace of King Louis and his lover, the Marquise de Maintenon (the historical Françoise d'Aubigné, Marquise de Maintenon). One night, a young man bangs on the door of de Scudéri's house and pleads urgently with her maid to be granted entrance. The maid finally lets him in but denies him access to her mistress, whose life she fears is in danger. The young man eventually flees at the sound of the approach of the mounted police, but leaves behind a small jewellery box he begs the maid to deliver to the Mademoiselle. The next morning, de Scudéri opens the box and finds exquisite jewellery and a note in which the band of jewel thieves thanks her for her support in the form of the verse quoted above.

Mademoiselle de Scudéri is distraught by the contents of the jewellery box and seeks the advice of her friend de Maintenon. The Marquise immediately recognises the jewellery as the work of the goldsmith René Cardillac. Cardillac is known not only in Paris but around the world as the best artist in his field. He is also famous, however, for a strange attribute: he creates the most beautiful pieces of jewellery but then does not want to part with them. Only after much delay does he finally deliver a piece to the customer who commissioned it, and then only under (sometimes violent) protest.

Several months later, Mademoiselle de Scudéri is riding in a glass coach over the Pont Neuf when a young man forces his way through the crowd and throws a letter into the coach. The letter adjures the Mademoiselle to find whatever pretence necessary but to return the jewellery to Cardillac at once. If she does not, the letter warns, her life is in danger. She is overcome by feelings that she is surrounded by "strange events and dark mysteries" but decides to heed the letter writer's appeal.

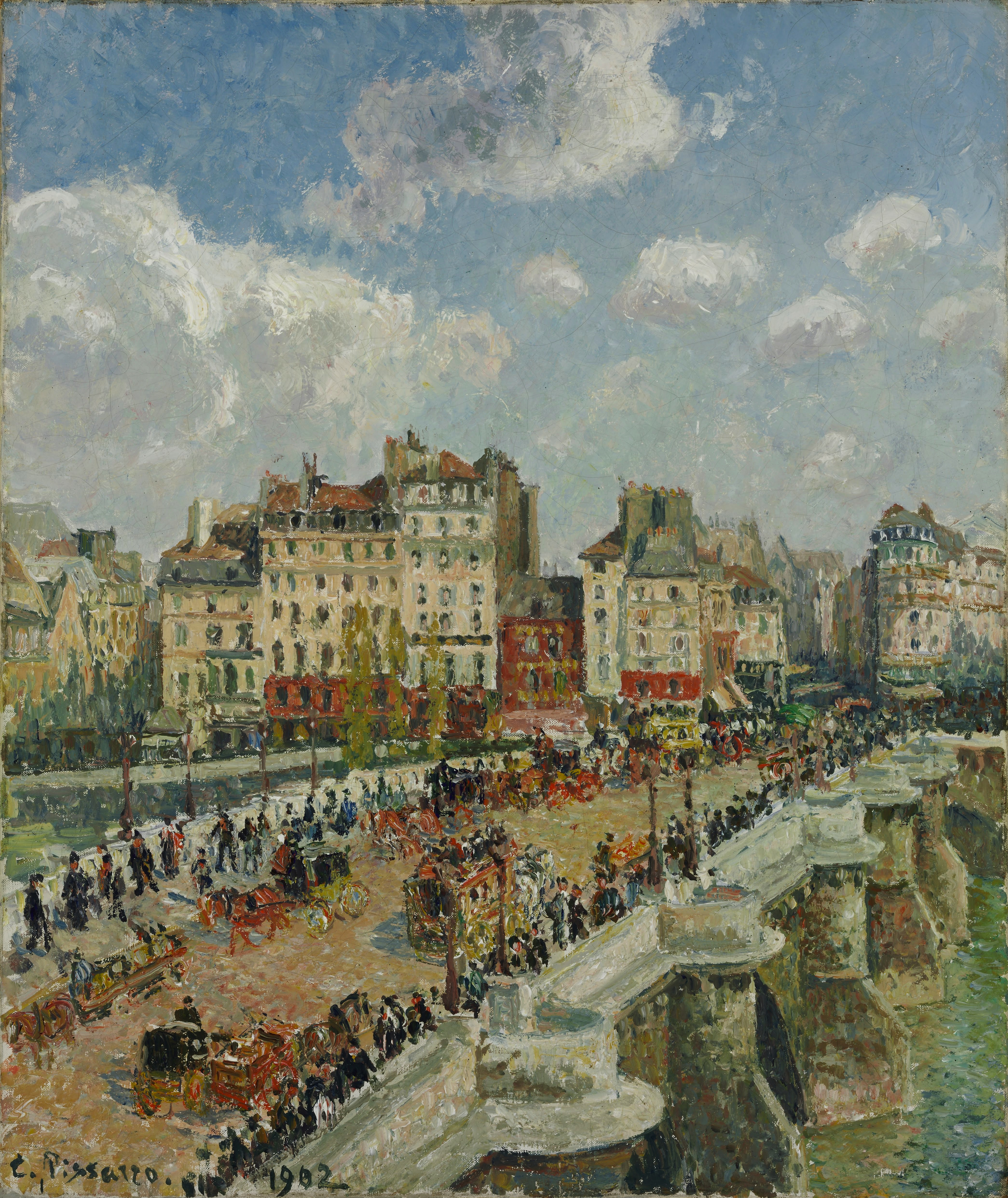
Pont Neuf

Two days later, she travels to the goldsmith's house, only to arrive just as his corpse is being carried away. Cardillac has been murdered, and Olivier Brusson, Cardillac's assistant, has been arrested for the crime. Cardillac's daughter Madelon, who is betrothed to Olivier, protests his innocence. Because of Madelon's suffering and utter despair, Mademoiselle de Scudéri takes pity on her and takes her to her house to look after her.

Touched by and believing Madelon's avowals of Olivier's innocence, the Mademoiselle tries to intercede on his behalf with La Régnie. He receives her graciously but is unmoved and presents her with circumstantial evidence that, in his view, proves that Olivier is the murderer. The Mademoiselle hears the evidence but cannot convince herself of the young man's guilt. La Régnie grants her permission to speak with Olivier, but when she meets him in prison she recognises the young man who had thrown the warning letter into her coach and falls to the ground unconscious. She now is uncertain of Olivier's innocence and is torn inwardly. She curses the destiny that had made her believe in truth and virtue but now has destroyed the beautiful image she had made for her life.

In the hope that Olivier will confess, Desgrais, de Scudéri's friend and an officer in the mounted police, offers to arrange for a meeting with Olivier in her house. The mademoiselle is filled with foreboding but nevertheless decides to obey the higher powers that had marked her for the solution of some terrible mystery. Olivier is brought to her house, and while guards wait outside, he falls on his knees and tells her his story:

Olivier tells the mademoiselle that he is the son of the impoverished young woman, Anne, whom de Scudéri had lovingly raised as her own daughter and from whom she has not heard since she married an industrious and skilled young watchmaker who took her and Olivier to Geneva to seek their fortune. Because of the jealousy of others in his profession, Olivier relates, his father was not able to establish himself in Geneva, and both he and his wife later died there in poverty. Olivier, who had apprenticed himself to a goldsmith, eventually became so skilled in his profession that he was hired as an assistant by René Cardillac in Paris.

All went well, Olivier tells the Mademoiselle, until Cardillac threw him out of the house because he and Cardillac's daughter, Madelon, had fallen in love. In his desperation and longing, Olivier went one night to Cardillac's house in the hope of catching a glimpse of his beloved. Instead, he saw Cardillac slip out of the house through a secret entrance and, not far away, attack and kill a man by thrusting a dagger into his heart. Cardillac, who knows that Olivier has seen the murder, invites him to return to his workshop and offers him his daughter in marriage. Olivier's silence had been bought, he confesses to de Scudéri, but he relates how from then on he lived with intense pangs of guilt.

One evening, Olivier tells de Scudéri that Cardillac told Olivier his own story. (The plot here becomes a story within a story within a story.) Cardillac tells Olivier how an experience involving a sumptuous diamond necklace (the necklace was worn by a Spanish actor with whom she later had an adulterous affair) that his mother had while she was pregnant with him had marked him for life with a love of fine jewellery. This love caused him to steal jewellery as a child and later led him to become a goldsmith. An "inborn drive," Cardillac told Olivier, forced him to create his renowned works but led him also again and again to take them back from his customers in thefts that often involved murder. Olivier tells de Scudéri that Cardillac stored the retrieved pieces, which were labelled with the names of their rightful owners, in a secret, locked chamber in his house.

Eventually, Olivier informs the mademoiselle that Cardillac decided to give Mademoiselle de Scudéri some of his best work in thanks for the verse that she had quoted to the King in response to the appeal from the threatened lovers. He asked Olivier to present the gift, and Olivier saw in the request a chance to re-establish contact with the woman who had loved and cared for him when he was a child and to reveal to her his unfortunate situation. He was able to deliver the jewel box but was not able to meet with the Mademoiselle.

Some time later, Cardillac again was overcome by his evil star, and it is clear to Olivier that he wanted to retrieve by force the jewellery that he had given to the Mademoiselle. To prevent this, Olivier relates, he threw the letter into de Scudéri's coach, imploring her to return the jewellery as soon as possible. Two days later, because he was afraid that his master was about to attack Mademoiselle de Scudéri, Olivier secretly followed him when he left the house under cover of darkness. Instead of the mademoiselle, Cardillac attacked an officer, who stabbed Cardillac with his dagger and then fled. Olivier brought Cardillac and the murder weapon back to his house, where the master died of his injuries. Olivier was arrested and charged with the murder. His intention, he states, is to die for the murder if he must in order to spare his beloved Madelon the sorrow of learning the truth about her father. With this, Olivier ends his story and is returned to prison. Because he continues to refuse to confess, an order for his torture is issued.

Mademoiselle de Scudéri makes a number of attempts to save Olivier, including writing a letter to La Régnie, but she is unsuccessful. She even wants to plead his case before the King himself, but a famous lawyer by the name of d'Andilly, whom she has consulted, convinces her that at this stage in his case this would not be in the young man's best interest.

Unexpectedly, an officer in the King's Guard by the name of Miossens visits her and reveals that he is the person who, in self-defence, stabbed and killed Cardillac. The astonished Mademoiselle says to him, "And you have said nothing? You have not made a statement to the authorities regarding what happened?" Miossens defends himself by stating, "Allow me to remark that such a statement, even if it did not cause my ruin, would at least involve me in a most loathsome trial. Would La Régnie, who scents crime everywhere, immediately believe me if I accused the honest Cardillac, the very embodiment of complete piety and virtue, of attempted murder?" Miossens refuses to consider Olivier innocent, accusing him instead of being Cardillac's accomplice.

Under a pledge of secrecy, Miossens repeats his testimony to d'Andilly, and with this information the lawyer is able to have Olivier's torture postponed. Subsequently, de Scudéri is successful in getting the King to review the case once again. After a month of uncertainty, he reveals to the Mademoiselle that Olivier has been freed, that he will be allowed to marry his beloved Madelon, and that he will receive 1,000 louis d'or as a dowry under the condition that they leave Paris. Olivier and Madelon move to Geneva, where they live happily. The jewellery stolen by Cardillac is returned to the rightful owners, who are still living. The rest becomes the property of the Church of St. Eustace.

== Origins ==
Hoffmann got the idea for his tale from the seventh chapter of Johann Christoph Wagenseil's chronicle of the city of Nuremberg titled Johann Christof Wagenseil's Book on the Gracious Art of the Meistersingers [Johann Christof Wagenseils Buch von der Meister-Singer Holdseligen Kunst]. This report attributes to Mademoiselle de Scudéri the two-line stanza quoted above:

A lover who is afraid of thieves
Is not worthy of love.

Using Wagenseil's brief account as a starting point, Hoffmann did extensive research to ensure that his depictions of Paris at the time of Louis XIV would be accurate in the minutest detail. A short letter from the author dated March 28, 1818, to a lending librarian in Berlin requests works that likely provided him with historical material for his novella: Friedrich Lorenz Meyers's Letters from the Capital and from within France under the Consular Government [Briefe aus der Hauptstadt und dem Innern Frankreichs unter der Consular-Regierung] (Tübingen, 1802), Eberhard August Wilhelm von Zimmermann's Paris as It Was and as It Is [Paris wie es war und wie es ist] (Leipzig, 1805), and a translation of Voltaire's Times of Louis XIV [Siècle de Louis XIV] (Dresden, 1778). It seems certain that Hoffmann also referred to Friedrich Schulzen's Of Paris and the Parisians [Über Paris und die Pariser] (Berlin, 1791).

The realism created by Hoffmann's thorough descriptions of historical events, persons, and places helps ensure the believability of the plot and the characters of the story. With the exception of the Mademoiselle, the King, and the Marquise de Maintenon, however, the characters of the novella appear to be Hoffmann's inventions. It is possible that the Cardillac character was inspired by an autobiographical account by the Italian goldsmith and sculptor Benvenuto Cellini, where he writes of the cold-hearted way in which he contemplated and carried out murders during his time in Paris:

When certain decisions of the court were sent me by those lawyers, and I perceived that my cause had been unjustly lost, I had recourse to a great dagger I carried. ... The first man I attacked was a plaintiff who had sued me; one evening I wounded him ... so severely that I deprived him of the use of both his legs.

Hoffmann knew of this account from Goethe's translation of Cellini's Vita (1558).

It is likely Hoffmann drew on Chapter 1 of Wagenseil's chronicle for the characteristics he ascribes to the heroine of the title. Wagenseil reports he "had the honour of visiting Mademoiselle Magdalena de Scudery, a woman from a most distinguished noble family and world famous for her virtue, great intelligence, and multilingualism." Kent and Knight write that

Madeleine de Scudéri (1607–1701) came to Paris in 1630 and became connected with the salon of Mme. de Rambouillet (Catherine de Vivonne, marquise de Rambouillet). Later she formed a literary circle of her own. ... Highly artificial, poorly constructed, flawed by pointless dialogue, her works were popular at the court, primarily because of their anecdotes about public personages. They served the parvenu well.

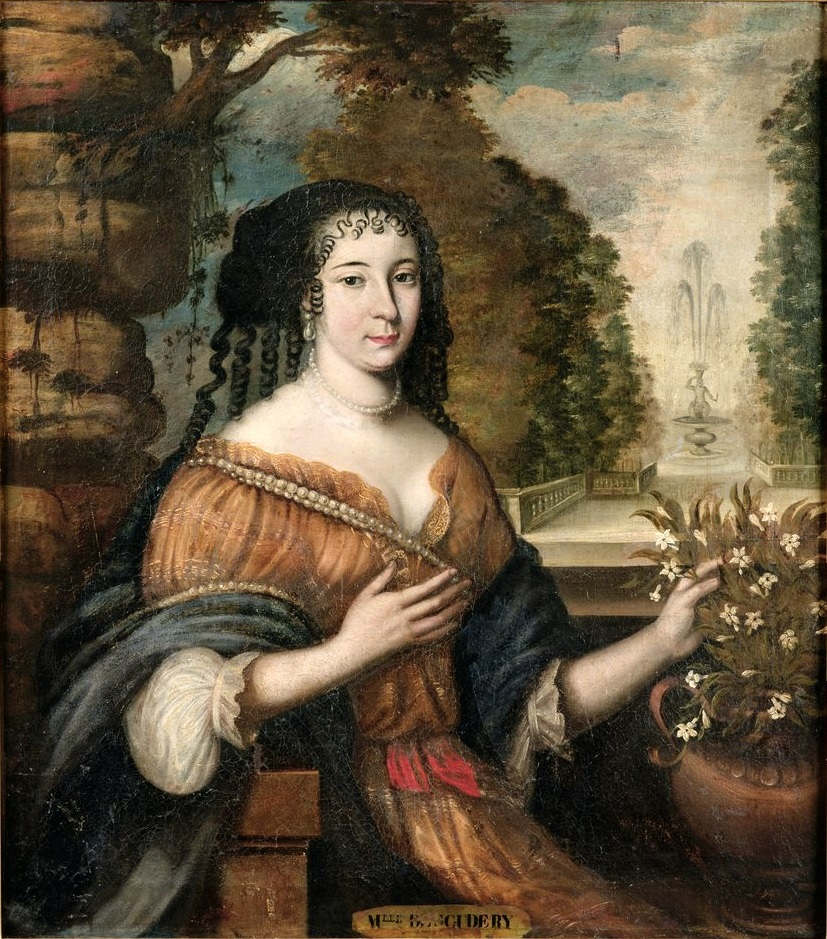
The historical Madeleine de Scudéry

For his description of Olivier's legal proceedings, the jurist Hoffmann drew on his extensive knowledge of and experience with the law. A colleague wrote that Hoffmann's professional activities were without fault, but also commented

Only in a few areas of his criminal work could it ever be said that he allowed himself to be led down a false path, e.g., in cases in which proof of guilt rested on artificially intertwined pieces of evidence or on the assessment of dubious frames of mind. In these areas he occasionally fell into constellations that reflected more his ingenuity and fantasy than a process of calm deliberation. ... His presentations of the facts, however, were always impeccable and of a precision that cannot be praised enough.

Perhaps it was Hoffmann's tendency to lean towards the ingenious and fantastic, even in his professional life, that allowed him to write the intriguing psychological tale of crime that is Mademoiselle de Scudéri.

== Plot analysis ==
In his introduction to one of the earliest complete editions of Hoffmann's works, Ellinger presents a cogent analysis of the plot of Mademoiselle de Scudéri:

[Hoffmann's first goal was to remove] Wagenseil's report from the realm of the anecdotal. The unusual step taken by the lovers of Paris to appeal directly to the King for protection had to be motivated by an ominous supernatural force, i.e., something that lay completely outside the sphere of ordinary events. While Hoffmann was engaged in this train of thought, the personage of René Cardillac appeared to him. The powerful impression that this character creates can be attributed, in part, to qualities that reflect basic elements of the author's soul: firstly, Cardillac is the artist who can never satisfy himself; secondly, he is both guilty and innocent, his fate having been sealed even before he was born by the unholy demon that drives him from one crime to another.

Equal to the powerful impression made by the character René Cardillac is that created by the compelling structure of Hoffmann's story. He has Cardillac appear only once in living form; most of the novella takes place after his death. The plot is carried forth by completely different characters, primarily the betrothed couple Olivier and Madelon. The reader's involvement turns around the question of whether Olivier will be successful in proving his innocence in Cardillac's murder. Even though the author uses his story-telling ability to awaken the reader's interest in these characters and that of Mademoiselle de Scudéri, which now stand in the forefront, the overall impression retained by the reader is determined for the most part by ... the shadow cast by the terrible personage and the cruel fate of René Cardillac. It is precisely before this dark background that the purely human, endearing qualities represented by Mademoiselle de Scudéri and the young couple are made to stand out.

Mademoiselle de Scudéri is less dreamlike and surreal in its construction than most of Hoffmann's other stories. The plot generally is carried forward by sharp, realistic descriptions of people and events rather than by the seemingly irrational occurrences generally associated with Hoffmann's writing in particular and Romanticism in general. Against this realism, however, the relationship between Olivier and Madelon seems stylised and idealistic. This aspect of the plot of the story is certainly its most romantic in the sense of the 19th-century literary movement. For Hoffmann (perhaps the arch-romantic of German literature), it may have been impossible to write about love in any other way.

== Interpretations ==
As Kaiser has pointed out,

In its apparent simplicity, [Mademoiselle de Scudéri] contradistinguishes itself from those works in which Hoffmann himself was able to view the pinnacle of his aesthetic achievement (The Golden Pot [Der goldne Topf] and Tomcat Murr [Kater Murr], for example). Nevertheless, the various interpretations that the story has inspired—as deserving of criticism as each may be in and of itself—have shown that, beneath the surface of a tightly organized text, the novella is truly a multilayered work.

Some of these interpretations are reviewed below.

=== Mademoiselle de Scudéri as crime fiction ===
The most frequently encountered interpretation of Hoffmann's novella holds that it is an early example of crime fiction, perhaps the earliest in German literature. Crime fiction generally is divided into two main categories: the detective story and the crime story. In the detective story, as defined by The Oxford Companion to English Literature, "a crime (generally, though not necessarily, a murder) is committed [...]; the puzzle of the criminal's identity is finally solved through a process of investigation, observation, and deduction by an expert detective. In a crime story, the criminal's identity is known from the start, and the interest lies in observing his psychology and his attempts to escape justice ..."

Alewyn argues that with Mademoiselle de Scudéri Hoffmann created not only the first German detective story, but the first detective story in any language (it appeared before Poe's The Murders in the Rue Morgue (1841). He writes that

In this story we find, in addition to several subordinate motifs, the three elements that constitute a detective novel: first, the murder, actually, a series of murders, takes place at the beginning and is resolved at the end; second, there is the innocent suspect and the unsuspected guilty party; and third, the detection, not by the police but by an outsider, an elderly poetess.

If on first reading Alwyn's thesis seems plausible, Conrad argues it is weak. If Mademoiselle de Scudéri is a detective, she is an inept one. Her attempts at solving the mystery by deduction fail. It is not expert detective work but the confession of Miossens that eventually reveals to the authorities that it was Cardillac who committed the many murders and jewellery thefts in Paris. De Scudéri is helpful in freeing the innocent Olivier because of her humanity, nobility of character, sympathy, and access to the king, not because of her ability to investigate, reason, and draw conclusions from evidence.

A case can be made that Mademoiselle de Scudéri is an example of crime fiction as defined above, but this thesis is also weak. The story does briefly deal with the psychology of the criminal (revealed in Olivier's back-story), but Cardillac's pathology plays only a minor role in the plot. Furthermore, the criminal is not known from the beginning. In fact, at least a third of the novella takes place after his death. The reader's interest centres on whether Olivier will be exonerated and reunited with his fiancée, not whether the murderer or murderers of so many Parisians will be discovered and brought to justice.

=== Sociopolitical interpretations ===
As Miossens's behaviour clearly indicates, the Chambre ardente hinders more than facilitates the solving of the mysterious series of crimes plaguing Paris. Indeed, La Régnie and his henchmen spread as much terror as the criminal who strikes under the cover of night and leaves no trace of himself. At first, the seemingly airtight case the Chambre builds against Olivier, including a suspicion of Madelon's complicity, convinces even Mademoiselle de Scudéri and the sceptical lawyer d'Andilly of his guilt in Cardillac's murder. As the reader knows, the case is completely groundless. It is only de Scudéri's sensitivity and inner voice that lead her to believe in Olivier's innocence again. The positive outcome results almost solely from her friendship with the King.

This aspect of Hoffmann's novella has been interpreted as a sharp critique of the legal institutions of France during the reign of Louis XIV and, by extension, of the reforms to the Prussian legal system of his own time. These reforms (and their accompanying police practices) had as their goal the abolition of the absolute right of the monarch to rule as he saw fit in all legal matters. Before the reforms, the king stood completely above and outside the law. This interpretation sees Hoffmann as legitimising, to some extent (using the Ancien Régime as an allegory), a system of absolute rather than constitutional monarchy. Hoffmann appears to favour a legal system based not on pure rationality, but instead on a humanism based on intuition and empathy.

=== Psychological interpretations ===
From a psychological standpoint, Cardillac seems much more interesting than de Scudéri. Perhaps this is why Hindemith named his opera (1926) and Reitz his film (1968) Cardillac rather than Mademoiselle de Scudéri.

Dissociation Tölle contends that Mademoiselle de Scudéri contains the earliest description of a double life in the sense of the abnormal psychological phenomenon known as dissociation (segregation of a group of mental processes from the rest of a person's usually integrated functions of consciousness, memory, perception, and motor behaviour). This, the researcher points out, is by no means the same thing as the disorder commonly known as a "split personality." Goldsmith Cardillac is one of the most respected citizens of Paris but at the same time a serial killer. Tölle finds it remarkable that Hoffmann had no model for this dissociative behaviour and concludes that it must have been of his own invention. As he notes, what the author described can often be observed in ordinary life: for example, lady during the day, prostitute at night; husband during the day, criminal at night; loving father on the one hand and despotic boss on the other (or the reverse).

The artist as prostitute Safranski points out that the artist Cardillac finds it impossible to see his works, in which he has invested everything that he loves and everything that he is capable of, in the hands of strangers who have no other use for them than to indulge their vanity, satisfy their love of glitter, and further their amorous adventures. Ritter Gluck, in Hoffmann's work by the same name, states that "... art prostitutes itself when it sells itself." Through Gluck and Cardillac, Hoffmann seems to be saying that there is a dramatic gap between what art means to the artist and what it means to the general public. In the biblical sense, the artist who sells his art "casts pearls before swine".

=== Religious interpretation ===
Himmel sees de Scudéri as the person who Cardillac hopes will counteract the evil star that rules his life. He has chosen her rather than the Virgin Mary to be his saviour. He points out that one of the items Cardillac offers the mademoiselle in his first attempt to give her jewellery is a beautiful diamond crown that he had intended for the Holy Virgin in the Church of Saint Eustace. Himmel notes that Eustace (Placidus) is said to have been an avid hunter until he was ordered by a stag bearing a cross between its horns to give up hunting. In this interpretation, Cardillac hopes that the virtuous de Scudéri could free him from his drive to hunt humans. The mademoiselle, however, is incapable of replacing either Mary or the Saint as the rescuer of the sacrilegious goldsmith.

== Adaptations ==
- 1847 – Otto Ludwig, author: Das Fräulein von Scuderi, play in five acts
- 1911 – Mario Caserini, director: Madmoiselle de Scudery, movie
- 1926 – Paul Hindemith, composer: Cardillac, opera in three acts and four scenes (libretto by Ferdinand Lion)
- 1951 – Paul Martin, director: The Deadly Dreams, movie
- 1955 – Eugen York, director: Das Fräulein von Scuderi, movie
- 1969 – Edgar Reitz, director: Cardillac, movie
- 1976 – Lutz Büscher, director: Das Fräulein von Scuderi, TV movie
- 2011 – Alexandra Kardinar and Volker Schlecht, writers and artists: Das Fräulein von Scuderi, comic book
