= Subs (novel) =

2011 novel by Thor Kunkel

- Author: Thor Kunkel
- Language: German
- Publisher: Heyne Verlag
- Publication date: 2011
- Publication place: Germany
- Pages: 448
- ISBN: 3-453-26692-7

Subs is a 2011 satirical novel by the German writer Thor Kunkel. The main characters are a wealthy Berlin couple, the cosmetic surgeon Claus Gordian Müller-Dodt and his lawyer wife Evelyn, who advertise for "slaves" to do household chores for them, and acquire a young woman and an older man. The subs of the title comes from BDSM and is short for submissives.

Deutschlandfunk Kultur compared the portrayal of slaves to real-life illegal immigrants and called the book "a disturbing and at times very funny critique of culture and civilization".

The novel was the basis for the 2018 film Herrliche Zeiten directed by Oskar Roehler.
