= Lust for Love =

Lust for Love may refer to:

- Lust for Love (1967 film), a 1967 West German drama film
- Lust for Love (2014 film), a 2014 independent romantic comedy film
