= Ula Stöckl =

German filmmaker, writer, director and actress

- Born: Ulm
- Education: Ulm School of Design
- Occupations: Actress; film director; filmmaker; screenwriter

Ula Stöckl is a German feminist film maker and director, screenwriter and occasional actress.

She believes passionately that there should be more women exerting their influence in the film business. She was born in Ulm and attended the Ulm School of Design.

== Life ==
=== Provenance and early years ===
Ula Stöckl was born in Ulm a few weeks before the (largely uncontested) incorporation of Austria into an enlarged Germany. Alfons Stöckl, her father, was a professional orchestral clarinettist. He was sent away to fight in the war, but survived. After the war the wages of the players in her father's orchestra were halved, and to support the family budget Ula's mother, born Katharina Kreis, took factory work in the textiles sector. Katharina Stöckl-Kreis had grown up in an orphanage, looked after by nuns who had solicitously educated her in a formidable range of house-wifely skills, and brought a steely practicality to the challenges of raising a family on her own during the war years. But as her daughter later recalled, during the first four decades of her life she had not been well prepared for factory work: her fingers were almost always bandaged. Many of Ula's most vivid childhood memories relate to her family's experiences of the wartime bombing of Ulm, clutching one of her mother's hands while her younger sister clutched the other and night after night they watched the city burn. Their home and the surrounding area were destroyed on 17 December 1944: collateral damage included three dead siblings, but both her parents had survived. She never thought to ask whether they were paying any rent for the succession of little rooms in which they were accommodated over the next few months. Subsequent memories included the flu epidemic and starvation winter in 1946. The birth of another sister in 1948 meant that she was no longer her parents' only surviving child and represented some kind of a new beginning for the family. Stöckl quit school in 1954 and trained for secretarial work, which would remain her principal source of paid employment till 1963. In February 1958 she embarked on languages courses in Paris and London. Between 1961 and 1963 she worked as a trilingual executive secretary. Between May and August 1963 she worked as an editorial assistant with the publishers DM-Verlag at Sandweier (at that time still just outside Baden-Baden, into which the little town has subsequently been subsumed).

=== Student ===
In 1963 Stöckl enrolled as a student at the "Institut für Filmgestaltung" (loosely, "Institute for Making Films"), a department of the School of Design ("Hochschule für Gestaltung") which had been set up ten years earlier in Ulm, and which had built a reputation for its innovative approach to teaching. She was the first female student to be admitted to the course, which she completed in 1968.

She produced her first film, "Antigone", in 1964 as part of her course, using a silent 35-mm Arri camera. Just seven minutes long, it is of necessity episodic, relating just a few of the key moments in the Greek myth on which it is based. Her graduation feature film, "Neun Leben hat die Katze" (1968: "The cat has nine lives"), subsequently acquired a cult status among supporters, seen by some as "West Germany’s first feminist film". These two productions identified the themes and set the direction for much of Stöckl's later work. It failed to go on general release when first produced due to the insolvency of the selected distributor, but subsequent critics and film scholars have nevertheless born witness to its enduring significance.

=== Film career ===
In 1968 Ula Stöckl set up her own production company, "‚Ula Stöckl Filmproduktion". The next year she teamed up with Edgar Reitz to produce "die Geschichten vom Kübelkind" (loosely, "Tales of the Dumpster Kid"), a film of 22 episodes from the life of a girl who does not conform to the norms of civil society. The shortest episode lasts just 66 seconds: the longest 25 minutes. Reitz described it as the story of a "perverse polymorph, an infantile monstrous person", (Note: "...polymorph-perversen, infantilen, monströsen Person...") but it also gave an insight into how such a combination of characteristics might be instilled by a deeply challenging succession of childhood experiences. Originally intended for showing in experimental cinemas and, according to at least one source, in pubs, starting in 1971 sections of it began to find their way onto television, thereby garnering a larger more mainstream audience and establishing more broadly the public reputations of its two co-producers. "Kübelkind" was part of a new wave of films from a younger generation of producers, often categorised as the New German Cinema genre.

Through the 1970s Ula Stöckl worked almost exclusively on television films, and much of her professional focus continued to focus on the "small screen" through the 1980s and 1990s. Her theme was frequently that of human conflict, viewed from the – in her hands very distinctive – perspective of women or children. She took care to avoid one-sidedness and confronted her characters with almost unbearable problems, often based on dreams.

In 1984 she returned to the cinema with one of her most acclaimed productions, "Der Schlaf der Vernunft" ("Sleep of Reason"). The themes were familiar, but by now she was working with a level of assurance and self-confidence which meant that critics were a little less inclined to challenge the various quirkinesses in the approach taken. Another important milestone in Stöckl's film career was "Das alte Lied" ("The old song"), one of the first so-called "Spielfilme" (loosely, "narrative films"), and appeared in 1992. While again revisiting her theme of conflict in human relationships, it also dealt with some of the themes arising out of reunification, and thereby touched on matters which at the time were preoccupying very many Germans. "Das alte Lied" was, and seems likely to remain, the last of Ula Stöckl's films for cinema.

=== Stage ===
Ula Stöckl has only briefly involved herself with theatre. In 1974 she co-produced with Rainer Werner Fassbinder Strindberg's stage drama Fräulein Julie at the Theater am Turm in Frankfurt am Main. For one reason and another, the experience was not an entirely happy one.

=== Teaching ===
Stöckl has undertaken teaching contracts for the German Film and Television Academy in Berlin and, in North America, at the venerable Hollins University in Roanoke VA. Since 2004 she has also held a professorship at the University of Central Florida on the edge of Orlando FL where she focuses on film direction and production and, inevitably, on the place of women in film.

=== Film festivals ===
She has shown particular dedication to film festivals, through which she is also able to progress her feminist ambitions for society. For fifteen years following its foundation in 1978 she was closely engaged with the International Women's Film Festival in Créteil (Paris). Since 1982 she has worked for the "Berlinale" film festival in connection with "competition and panorama", also finding a niche as a moderator and presenter of the festival's press conferences and public discussions. For a couple of years between 2002 and 2004 she was also employed as a programme adviser in the selection committee for the Venice International Film Festival.

== Filmography ==
- 1964: Antigone (Short film: Screenplay, Direction, Editing)
- 1965: Miniaturen (Short film: Direction)
- 1965: Do You Have a Dregree? (Short film: Screenplay, Direction, Co-production, Editing)
- 1966: Saturday at 5 P.M. (Short film: Screenplay, Direction)
- 1967: Lust for Love (Screenplay, Co-direction)
- 1968: The Cat Has Nine Lives (Screenplay, Direction, Co-Production)
- 1969: Das schwache Geschlecht muß stärker werden / Weibergeschichten (TV-documentary film: Co-directoion)
- 1970: Stories of the Dumpster Kid (with Edgar Reitz – Screenplay, Direction)
- 1971: The Golden Thing (with Edgar Reitz, Alf Brustellin and Nikos Perakis – TV film: Screenplay, Direction)
- 1971: Brainworks (TV film: Screenplay, Direction, Production)
- 1973: The Little Lion and the Big Ones (TV film: Screenplay, Direction, Production)
- 1973: A Very Perfect Couple (TV film: Screenplay, Direction, Production)
- 1974: Die Schildkröte (TV film: Screenplay)
- 1974: Rabbit and Porcupine (TV film: Screenplay, Direction, Production)
- 1975: Popp and Mingel (TV film: Screenplay, Direction)
- 1976: Erika's Passions (TV film: Screenplay, Direction, Production)
- 1978: A Woman With Responsibility (TV film: Co-author screenplay, Direction)
- 1980: Palermo or Wolfsburg (Production)
- 1981: Freak Orlando (Production)
- 1981: Day of the Idiots (Production)
- 1982: The Heiresses; Episode 4: Den Vätern vertrauen, gegen alle Erfahrung (TV film: Screenplay, Direction, Production)
- 1984: Sleep of Reason (Screenplay, Direction, Production)
- 1984: Jakob's Pigeons or Quarrel in Tomorrow Already (TV film: Screenplay, Direction, Production)
- 1985: Oranisches Tor (TV film: Production)
- 1987: Equal Opportunity in Principle (TV documentary film: Screenplay, Direction, Production), Part of the television series Unerhört – Die Geschichte der deutschen Frauenbewegung von 1830 bis heute
- 1987: Is Nobody Listening? (TV documentary film: Screenplay, Direction), Part of the television series Unerhört – Die Geschichte der deutschen Frauenbewegung von 1830 bis heute
- 1991: Don't Talk About Fate (Direction)
- 1991: The Old Song (Screenplay, Direction)
- 1993: Turn of the Heart (TV-documentary series Lebenslinien: Screenplay, Direction)
- 1993: The Wild Stage (TV: Screenplay, Direction)

== Awards and honours (selection) ==
- 1968: Screenplay prize from the Kuratorium junger deutscher Film
- 1985: Film critics' prize for "The Sleep of Reason"
- 1985: Movie Silver Ribbon for "The Sleep of Reason"
- 1999: Konrad Wolf Prize for her life's work
