= In Danger and Deep Distress, the Middleway Spells Certain Death =

- Directed by: Alexander Kluge; Edgar Reitz
- Written by: Alexander Kluge; Edgar Reitz
- Produced by: Edgar Reitz; Alexander Kluge
- Cinematography: Edgar Reitz; Alfred Hürmer
- Edited by: Beate Mainka-Jellinghaus
- Release date: 18 December 1974
- Running time: 86 minutes
- Country: West Germany
- Language: German

In Danger and Deep Distress, the Middleway Spells Certain Death (German: In Gefahr und größter Not bringt der Mittelweg den Tod, a quote from Friedrich von Logau (1605–1655)) is a 1974 drama film directed by Alexander Kluge and Edgar Reitz. It is set in Frankfurt and tells the story of two women, one who sleeps with many men and steals their wallets, and one who is a spy for East Germany. The film mimics the style of documentaries, with actual documentary footage from the city (like the quote, found on a cellar wall and used as title) as well as essayistic aspects.

It was released in Germany on 18 December 1974. It received the Deutscher Filmpreis for Best Editing and Best Musical Dramaturgy.

== Cast ==
- Dagmar Bödderich as Inge Maier
- Jutta Winkelmann as Rita Müller-Eisert
- Alfred Edel as Bieringer
- Norbert Kentrup as Max Endrich
- Jutta Thomasius as J. Thomasius
- Hans Drawe as Dietzlaff
