= Herrliche Zeiten =

- Directed by: Oskar Roehler
- Screenplay by: Jan Berger
- Based on: Subs by Thor Kunkel
- Produced by: Jutta Müller
- Starring: Katja Riemann; Oliver Masucci
- Cinematography: Carl-Friedrich Koschnick
- Edited by: Peter R. Adam
- Music by: Martin Todsharow
- Production company: Molina Film
- Distributed by: Concorde Filmverleih
- Release date: 3 May 2018
- Running time: 110 minutes
- Country: Germany
- Language: German

Herrliche Zeiten is a 2018 German comedy-drama film directed by Oskar Roehler, starring Katja Riemann and Oliver Masucci. It tells the story of an affluent couple looking for a new housekeeper. As a joke, they write in the ad that they are looking for "slaves", which has unexpected consequences. The film is based on the novel Subs by Thor Kunkel.

== Cast ==
- Katja Riemann as Evi Müller-Todt
- Oliver Masucci as Claus Müller-Todt
- Samuel Finzi as Bartos
- Lize Feryn as Svetlana
- Yasin El Harrouk
- Andrea Sawatzki
- Lena Schmidke
- Ilgar Khanikov
- Sara Fazilat
- Gottfried Vollmer
- Katy Karrenbauer
- Aslan Aslan as Tarek
- Ivan Jurcevic as Bodyguard

== Production ==
The film is based on the 2011 novel Subs written by Thor Kunkel. It is produced by Molina Film and co-produced by Tele München Gruppe. It received support from the Film- und Medienstiftung NRW, DFFF, BKM and Medienboard Berlin Brandenburg. Filming took place from 8 May to 20 June 2017 in and around Cologne.

== Release ==
The film was released in German cinemas on 3 May 2018.
