= Margit Geissler =

German actress (1958–2016)

- Born: 24 October 1958; West Berlin, West Germany
- Died: 22 February 2016 (aged 57); Munich, Bavaria, Germany
- Other name: Margit Geissler-Rothemund
- Occupation: Actress
- Years active: 1979–2011 (film & TV)

Margit Geissler (24 October 1958 – 22 February 2016) was a German model, film and television actress. She co-hosted the 1985 competition to select the German entry for the Eurovision Song Contest. She was married to the film director Sigi Rothemund.

== Selected filmography ==
- Nackt und heiß auf Mykonos (1979)
- Graf Dracula in Oberbayern (1979)
- Zum Gasthof der spritzigen Mädchen (1979)
- Beautiful and Wild on Ibiza (1980)
- Heiße Kartoffeln (1980)
- Ich bin dein Killer (1982)
- Das kann ja heiter werden (1982, TV series)
- Spring Symphony (1983)
- Beautiful Wilhelmine (1984, TV series)
- Starke Zeiten (1988)
- Marienhof (1995, TV series)

== Bibliography ==
- Mitchell, Charles P. The Great Composers Portrayed on Film, 1913 through 2002. McFarland, 2004.
