= Trip to Vienna =

1973 film

- Directed by: Edgar Reitz
- Written by: Alexander Kluge; Edgar Reitz
- Produced by: Edgar Reitz; Joachim von Mengershausen
- Starring: Elke Sommer; Hannelore Elsner; Mario Aldorf
- Cinematography: Robby Müller
- Edited by: Claudia Travnecek
- Music by: Hans Hammerschmid
- Production company: Edgar Reitz Film
- Distributed by: Gloria Film
- Release date: 26 September 1973
- Running time: 103 minutes
- Country: West Germany
- Language: German

Trip to Vienna (German: Die Reise nach Wien) is a 1973 German drama film directed by Edgar Reitz and starring Elke Sommer, Hannelore Elsner and Mario Adorf. During the Second World War, two small-town German women discover some money in an attic and decide to spend it on a trip to Vienna.

== Plot ==
Toni and Marga are two friends who live in a small German town in 1943, during World War II. Both women's husbands, like most men of the town, are away fighting in the war and Toni and Marga are bored, dreaming of an affair with a bearer of a Knight's Cross.

Toni has a joyless affair with Fred Scheuermann, a Nazi Party official and one of the few men in town. Marga lives with her aunt and both women help Marga's aunt perform an illegal slaughter of a pig, an act which is punishable by the death penalty.

When a young soldier comes home for a celebration of his recently achieved Knight's Cross, both women unsuccessfully flirt with him during the party. But then Toni discovers more than 15.000 Reichsmark which had been hidden by her husband and which was probably extorted from one of the Jewish residents of the town. Toni and Marga fear that the money will be worthless soon and both plan to go to Vienna, to buy some valuables with the money on the one hand and to see the city and meet attractive soldiers on the other hand.

During the train ride, they meet Mariu Moltenau, a suave gentleman who claims to be a Romanian officer on a secret mission in Vienna and who offers both women to help them obtain the needed valuables.

In Vienna, Toni meets Mariu in his apartment, gives him most of the money and is asked to return some days later to collect the valuables. Both women spend some days in Vienna sightseeing and unsuccessfully trying to meet decorated attractive soldiers. When Toni and Marga return to Mariu's apartment, no one opens the door. They return to his apartment several times, never getting in.

One night both women finally meet soldiers, Hauptmann Sperlinger who is on home leave and must return to the battle lines the next day, and Major Kopp, who has a limp and is stationed in Vienna. Toni sleeps with Sperlinger and Marga has sex with Kopp. A short time later, Kopp helps Marga and Toni get revenge on Mariu: He, along with another soldier, accompanies both women to Mariu's apartment and forces entry. Once inside the apartment, the soldiers and the women carry away valuables approximately worth the money they had given to Mariu. This includes porcelain, rugs and clocks. Mariu watches resignedly, not offering much protest.

Outside the house, Kopp tells the women that he has arranged passage for them to their home town with the valuables but that they will have to pay some intermediates to proceed along the way. During their journey, they have to exchange most of their valuables for the passage and for a small car that they travel with.

When they arrive home, they hide the car immediately but are then informed that the illegal slaughter has been exposed, their aunt has been jailed and Marga will probably soon also be indicted. Toni asks her lover Fred to help them but he refuses and then tells her that Marga's aunt has been killed during an aerial bombing of her prison. Both women now hatch a plan to deflect the blame and implicate Fred: they secretly hide meat products in Fred's office and his garden. Then Toni arranges a tryst with Fred, Marga arrives, and both make it look as if Fred had raped Toni and Marga caught him in the act.

When a party official is sent to investigate the accusations against Fred, he is skeptical of the much too neat evidence against Fred and wants to keep the scandal under wraps. So he makes Fred an offer: if Fred does not officially contest the charges, they will be silently dropped and he will be sent to the Eastern Front instead. After a short protest, Fred accepts and is sent to the front, where he is killed a short time later in battle.

The time skips ahead one year, to 1944, where it is shown that Marga and Toni had a falling out and have a violent argument when Toni wants to take the hidden car for a ride. In her rage, Marga destroys the windshield and more of the car.

The time skips ahead another year, to V-E Day. Marga and Toni are shown greeting each other on the street while watching allied troops enter the town.

== Cast ==
- Elke Sommer as Toni
- Hannelore Elsner as Marga
- Mario Adorf as Fred Scheuermann
- Nicolas Brieger as Rudi Schuster
- Heinz Reincke as Hauptmann Sperlinger
- Michael Janisch as Major Kopp
- Peter Moland as Erster Soldat
- Helmut Pick as Zweiter Soldat
- Ferdy Mayne as Mariu Moltenau
