= Cardillac (film) =

1969 film

- Theatrical release poster
- Directed by: Edgar Reitz
- Screenplay by: Edgar Reitz
- Based on: Mademoiselle de Scuderi by E. T. A. Hoffmann
- Produced by: Edgar Reitz
- Cinematography: Dietrich Lohmann
- Edited by: Maximiliane Mainka; Hannelore von Sternberg
- Production company: Edgar Reitz Filmproduktion
- Release dates: 28 August 1969 (Venice); 1 March 1970
- Running time: 97 minutes
- Country: West Germany
- Language: German

Cardillac is a 1969 West German drama film directed by Edgar Reitz, starring Hans-Christian Blech and Catana Cayetano. It tells the story of a goldsmith who is so obsessed with his own craft that he murders his customers. The film is a modern adaptation of E. T. A. Hoffmann's novella Mademoiselle de Scuderi.

(Composer Paul Hindemith also used the novella as the basis of his 1926 opera Cardillac.)

== Cast ==
- Hans Christian Blech as Cardillac
- Catana Cayetano as Madelon
- Rolf Becker as Olivier
- Liane Hielscher as Liane S.
- Werner Leschhorn as Albert von Boysen
- Gunter Sachs as Kunstsammler

== Release ==
The film premiered on 28 August 1969 at the 30th Venice International Film Festival. It was released in West Germany on 1 March 1970.
