= Das Schwarzlicht-Terrarium =

2000 novel by Thor Kunkel

- Author: Thor Kunkel
- Language: German
- Publisher: Rowohlt Verlag
- Publication date: 2000
- Publication place: Germany
- Pages: 640
- ISBN: 9783499226465

Das Schwarzlicht-Terrarium (lit. 'The Black Light Terrarium') is a 2000 novel by the German writer Thor Kunkel. Set in the late 1970s in the run-down Frankfurt district of Gallus, nicknamed Kamerun, it follows a number of eccentrics and petty criminals, to a backdrop of drug research and American influence. It was Kunkel's debut novel and published by Rowohlt Verlag.

A chapter from the book was awarded the Ernst-Willner-Preis in 1999. Critics described the book as a German answer to the film Pulp Fiction.
