= Das kann ja heiter werden =

- Country of origin: Germany
- No. of seasons: 1
- No. of episodes: 13

Production
- Running time: 25 minutes

Original release
- Network: ZDF
- Release: 10 February 1982

Das kann ja heiter werden is a 13-part German television series which was produced on ZDF in 1982. It stars Peer Augustinski, Margit Geissler, and Elke Aberle. It was first broadcast on 10 February 1982.

== Plot ==
Peer Augustinski plays the head of a residence for musicians, which is suffering from a shortage of staff. He has to dress up to assume various roles including pageboy, hotel doctor, cook and kitchen apprentice. He is assisted by the remaining permanent members of staff: Senta (Margit Geissler) and Miss Kauzig (Herta Worell). Guest appearances include Horst Jankowski, Paul Kuhn, Günter Noris, Peter Schiff, Hubert Suschka and Elisabeth Volkmann. Each episode leads to entertaining entanglements.

== Cast ==
- Peer Augustinski as Peer
- Margit Geissler as Senta
- Elke Aberle as Kathi
- Gunther Philipp as director
- Kurt Pratsch-Kaufmann as manager
- Heidi Kabel as director
- Max Grießer as Huber
- Uwe Dallmeier as humorist
- Helga Feddersen as Helga
- Erich Florin as Chorleiter Siegtaler Musikanten
- Benno Hoffmann as Polizeipräsident
- Die Berliner Hymnentafel as themselves
- Die Siegtaler Musikanten as themselves
