= The Cat Has Nine Lives =

1968 film

- Directed by: Ula Stöckl
- Written by: Ula Stöckl
- Starring: Liane Hielscher
- Release date: 1968
- Running time: 92 minutes
- Country: West Germany
- Language: German

The Cat Has Nine Lives (German: Neun Leben hat die Katze) is a 1968 West German drama film written and directed by Ula Stöckl. It was screened in the Berlinale Classics section of the 65th Berlin International Film Festival.

== Cast ==
- Liane Hielscher as Katharina
- Kristine De Loup as Anne
- Jürgen Arndt as Stefan
- Elke Kummer as Ehefrau von Stefan
- Alexander Kaempfe as Sascha
- Antje Ellermann
- Hartmut Kirste as Manfred
- Heidi Stroh as Gabriele
