= Endstufe (novel) =

2004 novel by Thor Kunkel

- Author: Thor Kunkel
- Language: German
- Publisher: Eichborn Verlag
- Publication date: 2004
- Publication place: Germany
- Pages: 587
- ISBN: 3-8218-0753-9

Endstufe ("final stage) is a 2004 novel by the German writer Thor Kunkel. Set in a hedonistic version of the Third Reich, it follows a biologist who works for the SS where he oversees the secret production of pornographic films.

== Themes ==
According to Kunkel, his intention with the novel was to "penetrate the private" and "use pornography as a poetic metaphor to fully grasp the phenomenon of the Third Reich".

== Reception ==
The novel immediately became controversial in Germany, when the publisher Rowohlt Verlag cancelled its contract with Kunkel two months before the scheduled release. The editor Alexander Fest motivated this by accusing Kunkel of "self-indulgent amoralism". After the book had been published by Eichborn Verlag, it created a debate in German newspapers. Der Spiegel called the novel "pure revisionism" for its portrayal of NS Germany as a "leisure society", while the end of the novel gives a detailed portrayal of Allied rapes and brutality. Der Spiegel also criticised Kunkel for the fact that the novel is not about the Holocaust and noted that the title, Endstufe, also is the name of a far-right German rock band. Further, Der Spiegel published private e-mails from Kunkel's former publisher Ulrike Schieder who complained about the novel's portrayal of Allied soldiers as "bloodthirsty animals" and of Germans as victims.

Kunkel dismissed the accusations as ridiculous, and accused his accusers of being upset only because the novel is "about the moral dimensions of everybody", in that it does not portray the sexual perversions of the Soviet and American armies as more righteous than those of the German side. He also argued that his critics did not understand his black humour, and that the book would have been uncontroversial in Britain or the United States, describing himself as an "Anglophile German".

An additional controversy surrounded Kunkel's claim that the novel was based on intense research about actual German pornography from the NS era. When this was questioned, Kunkel said that he had used what he called "intuitive research".

== See also ==
- German collective guilt
