= Cadavere a spasso =

- Directed by: Marco Masi
- Release date: 1965
- Country: Italy
- Language: Italian

Cadavere a spasso is a 1965 Italian comedy film directed by Marco Masi.

== Plot ==
The editor of a newspaper assigns Nicolino to do a story on an international thief named Fantasma. Nicolino, a young aspiring journalist eager for fame, rushes to a motel with his colleague Patrizia. Upon arrival, Patrizia discovers a man in her closet, who is actually just asleep. He's there because Serena, the lover of Floriano, accidentally gave Floriano a potent sleeping pill intended for her husband Ottavio. Believing Floriano to be dead, Serena hides him in the closet. Nicolino and Patrizia try to dispose of the body to avoid being accused of murder, but Floriano suddenly wakes up.

== Cast ==
- Pietro De Vico ... Nicolino
- Heidi Stroh ... Patrizia (as Heidy Stroh)
- Marisa Sally ... Serena
- Tiberio Murgia
- Enrico Pozzi
- Giuseppe Ricagno
- Fabio Battistini
- Luigi Batzella
- Conny Caracciolo
