= Zero Hour (1977 film) =

1977 film

- Directed by: Edgar Reitz
- Written by: Peter F. Steinbach; Edgar Reitz
- Produced by: Edgar Reitz
- Cinematography: Gernot Roll
- Edited by: Ingrid Broszat
- Music by: Nikos Mamangakis
- Release date: 6 February 1977
- Running time: 110 minutes
- Country: West Germany
- Language: German

Zero Hour (German: Stunde Null) is a 1977 West German drama film directed by Edgar Reitz, starring Kai Taschner and Anette Jünger. The narrative is set in the summer of 1945 in a small village outside Leipzig, where the Americans have just pulled back and been replaced by Soviet troops. The film follows the inhabitants as they adjust to the new situation, in particular Joschi, a teenage Hitler Youth member who is fascinated by the Americans.

The film was produced through Edgar Reitz Filmproduktions in collaboration with Bernd Eichinger's Solaris Film- und Fernsehproduktion and Westdeutscher Rundfunk. It was released in theatres on 6 February 1977 and broadcast on West 3 on 8 March the same year.

== Cast ==
- Kai Taschner as Joschi
- Anette Jünger as Isa
- Herbert Weißbach as Mattiske
- Klaus Dierig as Paul
- Günter Schiemann as Franke
- Erika Wackernagel as Mrs. Unterstab
- Torsten Henties as boy with a bike
- Erich Kleiber as Motek
- Bernd Linzel as Karl-Heinz
- Edith Kunze as Joschi's mother
