= Moselbrück =

- Starring: Liane Hielscher
- Country of origin: Germany

Moselbrück is a German television series.

== See also ==
- List of German television series
