= Beautiful and Wild on Ibiza =

- Directed by: Sigi Rothemund
- Written by: Erich Tomek
- Produced by: Wolfgang von Schiber; Karl Spiehs
- Starring: Régis Porte; Margit Geissler; Michael Gspandl
- Cinematography: Heinz Hölscher
- Edited by: Eva Zeyn
- Music by: Gerhard Heinz
- Production companies: Lisa Film; Geiselgasteig Film
- Distributed by: Residenz Film
- Release date: 17 October 1980
- Running time: 85 minutes
- Country: West Germany
- Language: German

Beautiful and Wild on Ibiza (German: Die schönen Wilden von Ibiza) is a 1980 West German comedy film directed by Sigi Rothemund and starring Régis Porte, Margit Geissler and Michael Gspandl.

== Cast ==
- Régis Porte as Mike
- Tanja Spiess as Susi
- Michael Gspandl as Poldi
- Beate Gränitz as Gilda
- Margit Geissler as Nadja
- Gesa Thoma as Ajita
- Heidi Stroh as Muschi
- Jan Hopmann as Juppy
- Karl Heinz Maslo as Bob
- Rafael Molina as Bosso
- Michael Spiess
- Manel Aragones
- Jean Henké
- Carlos "Carla" Delgardo

== Bibliography ==
- Roman Schliesser & Leo Moser. Die Supernase: Karl Spiehs und seine Filme. Ueberreuter, 2006.
