= No Place to Go (2000 film) =

2000 film

Die Unberührbare No Place to Go
- Directed by: Oskar Roehler
- Screenplay by: Oskar Roehler
- Based on: Life of Gisela Elsner
- Produced by: Käte Ehrmann; Ulrich Caspar
- Starring: Hannelore Elsner
- Cinematography: Hagen Bogdanski
- Edited by: Isabel Meier
- Music by: Martin Todsharow
- Production company: Distant Dreams
- Distributed by: Advanced
- Release date: 20 April 2000 (Germany)
- Running time: 110 minutes
- Country: Germany
- Language: German

No Place to Go (German: Die Unberührbare) is a German black-and-white film released in April 2000, directed by Oskar Roehler, starring Hannelore Elsner, about a suicidal middle-aged writer travelling around Germany at a time of personal crisis.

The movie won the Best Film Award at the 50th Deutscher Filmpreis "Lola Awards" in June 2000, while Elsner also won the Best Actress Award for her performance. It was also nominated for three national film Awards outside Germany and was entered for the Cannes Film Festival. In April 2001, it won the Golden Tulip Award at the International Istanbul Film Festival.

== Background ==
The film echoed the life of Gisela Elsner, the mother of the film's director, Oskar Roehler. A strong believer in Lenin, and for many years a member of the German Communist Party, Elsner was one of the most radical satirical writers in West Germany and had won the Prix Formentor in 1964. She was traumatized by German reunification, and on 13 May 1992 killed herself by jumping to her death from a window at a hospital in Munich. She was largely forgotten until interest in her life was revived in 2000 by No Place to Go.

In real life, Gisela Elsner did not kill herself until nearly three years had passed after the fall of the Berlin Wall. For dramatic effect, Roehler condensed his mother's decline and suicide into a few days.

== Outline ==
In the autumn of 1989, in her Munich bungalow, the writer Hanna Flanders (Hannelore Elsner) watches the Berlin Wall coming down on television. She telephones her friend Ronald (Tonio Arango), a playwright, and tells him she plans to kill herself with arsenic. They both smoke another cigarette, and Ronald talks Hanna into putting the arsenic bottle away. She was already in a bad way, addicted to nicotine and pills, and unable to sleep. Now, she is badly shaken by the news from Berlin, mainly for ideological reasons: the chance of Lenin's utopian ideas taking root in West Germany is now much less likely. It does not help that East Germany was the only country where her books were still being printed. Hanna, who has financial problems, decides to move to Berlin to observe the events there at first hand, and arranges the removal of her belongings, which costs most of her remaining money. Before setting off she blows some more of it on an expensive new coat by Christian Dior, in a boutique where she is a well-known customer. She does not know where she will live in Berlin, but believes her friends there will help her.

In Berlin, Hanna visits her son, Viktor (Lars Rudolph) who receives her coldly, and becomes aggressive when Hanna smokes in his apartment, as he decided to give up smoking when the Wall came down. She lacks his enthusiasm for the city and asks him about narcotics. He is annoyed by her barely-concealed contempt for his writing, and she leaves. Hanna then takes a room at the Hotel Excelsior, wears her new coat for the first time, and spends the night with a gigolo she meets in the hotel bar. The next day, she goes to see her publisher, Joachim Rau (Michael Gwisdek), at his East German "Volk und Welt" publishing house in East Berlin, and finds him half-drunk with friends, all of them struggling to come to terms with the new reality. One employee tells Hanna she is "a spoilt cow from the West" who never understood East Germany and only believed in it because it published her books. Not long ago, Joachim, her once-lover and mentor, told her that if she wanted to move to East Germany he would get her a place to live, but when Hanna reminds him of this he says "times have changed dramatically".

In East Berlin Hanna talks to strangers, but they cannot understand why she does not share their high spirits about what has just happened. One of them recognizes her and says "You're that Flanders woman who didn't understand the first thing about our political reality aside from some champagne receptions in Moscow!"

Hanna's furniture has not arrived from Munich, and she has hardly any money left. Joachim's assistant Grete (Nina Petri) puts her up in an apartment which Joachim keeps for his authors. This is outside the city, in an area of East German Plattenbau high-rise buildings, and is so shabby that Hanna runs away and spends the night in a bar, where East Germans are partying. Despite her heavily painted eyes and Cleopatra-style black wig, Hanna is recognized by a drunken schoolteacher, Dieter (Bernd Stempel), who approaches her and says he has read and taught all her books. When he begins to make physical advances she turns him away. He then shouts at her that for 20 years she has been writing "nothing but crap", and people in the bar have to stop him from hitting her. She runs away back to her temporary apartment, where she says to herself "This is a nightmare".

The next morning, Hanna goes to a fast food van, still tearful. Carmen (Claudia Geisler), a young woman who was in the bar the night before, takes her home. For the first time, Hanna can sleep, and she takes off her black wig. When she wakes up, she joins the family, but they are celebrating the turn of events. She realizes they do not understand her grief over the fall of the Berlin Wall, briefly calls Ronald, and leaves Berlin.

Hanna travels to Nuremberg to visit her bourgeois parents, who have a large house there, and asks them for money. Her mother (Helga Göring) is hostile, but her father (Charles Régnier) is more understanding and gives her five hundred Deutsche Mark. Coming away, she goes to the Nuremberg Central Station, where she runs into her first husband, Bruno (Vadim Glowna), who had to bring up their son on his own. He talks her into going with him to Darmstadt, and she stays overnight attempting a drunken reconciliation. In his apartment, they dance to a cover version of "Devil in Disguise". Bruno too has had to face a deep psychological trauma, the death of a beloved wife, becoming an alcoholic in response. Hanna goes on to Munich on her own and gets into her bungalow, but it is empty, as her furniture is on its way to Berlin, so she has to sleep on the floor on top of the belongings in her luggage. It was rented out to others, and she cannot move back in as she is unable to afford it. The next morning, now penniless, she tries to return her new Dior coat and get her money back, but the shop will not agree to this. She stays for one night with an old friend, who drinks too much even for her. She takes a sleeping pill, not knowing how soon it will take effect, and as a result collapses in a public square. On waking up in a hospital, she is told that she has extreme hardening of the arteries in one leg and must give up smoking, or her leg will have to be amputated, but even stopping smoking now might not save it. She must also undergo detoxification, thanks to all the tablets she has taken. She becomes very depressed, as smoking cigarettes is now her only pleasure in life.

In a withdrawal clinic, Hanna gets a visit from Ronald, who is about to leave for Vienna, but he can give her no comfort. She smokes one last cigarette in the lavatory and drops out of a top-floor window to her death.

== Reception ==
Kino said in its review

"This is a hymn of praise. For only every now and then do we encounter a film that's true, that's honest, that's valid to the core. Everything is right in Oskar Roehler's Die Unberührbare. Nothing is false or flimsy, is embarrassing, is out of time or place. One can say that this film – ten years after the fall of the wall – was truly necessary. Not everyone back then was cheering. Some were skeptical, others were reflective, for many a world had come crashing down. The utopia of a genuine socialist life had melted away to nothing. For Hanna Flanders, that's just the way it was."

The film was shown at the Museum of Modern Art, New York in April 2015 during a film festival. The New York Times critic A. O. Scott found it "a fascinating document of filial ambivalence - raw, merciless and yet ultimately tender, clearly driven by the need to make sense of an enigmatic and overpowering figure".

Johannes von Moltke noted that Hannelore Elsner had depicted Hanna Flanders as constantly ill at ease with her surroundings, unable to sit still, a chain smoker with no other way to calm her hands, and "a peripatetic protagonist on an errant journey across Germany", engaged in "a fruitless attempt to regain her footing in a world out of joint".

Lexikon des internationalen Films (International Film Lexicon) says of the movie

"The last months of Gisela Elsner, who, robbed by the fall of the Wall of her delusional and uncritical love for 'real socialism', departs this life. In black-and-white that expresses the psychological state of the central character, an author, her biography is exfoliated. Without using flashbacks, director Oskar Roehler, the son of Gisela Elsner, makes the interior and exterior political circumstances of this Life understandable. The film, a balancing act of critical-tender distance, proves in all respects artistically impressive and exciting. The outstanding Hannelore Elsner gives an important performance in the title role."

== Awards ==
On 16 June 2000, at the 50th Deutscher Filmpreis "Lola Awards", the film won the Best Film Award, while Hannelore Elsner won Best Actress. She then gained the Best Actress Award at the Bavarian Film Awards of 2000. The film was nominated for three national film Awards and was a German entry for the Cannes Film Festival Directors' Fortnight.

In April 2001, the film won the Golden Tulip Award in the Cinema and Art competition at the International Istanbul Film Festival. At the Miami Film Festival of 2001, it won the Critics' Choice Award.

The film was Germany's submission to the 73rd Academy Awards for Best Foreign Language Film, but was not accepted as a nominee. In the event the award was won by Taiwan's Crouching Tiger, Hidden Dragon.

== Cast ==
- Hannelore Elsner – Hanna Flanders
- Tonio Arango – Ronald
- Lars Rudolph – Viktor
- Michael Gwisdek – Joachim Rau
- Nina Petri – Grete
- Claudia Geisler – Carmen
- Charles Régnier – Hanna's father
- Helga Göring – Hanna's mother
- Vadim Glowna – Bruno
- Marie Zielcke – Nurse
- Jasmin Tabatabai – Meret
- Catherine Flemming – Isabelle
- Martin Wuttke – Fast food seller
- Birgit Stein – Owner of Boutique
- Christine Harbort – Irene
- Reinhard Scheunemann – Dietmar
- Gunda Ebert – Claudi
- Thomas Bading – Alfons
- Norman Schenk – Horst
- Faroque Khan – Egyptian
- Bernd Stempel – Dieter
- Harry Hass – Receptionist

== See also ==
- List of submissions to the 73rd Academy Awards for Best Foreign Language Film
