= Das Fräulein von Scuderi (comic book) =

2011 comic book by Alexandra Kardinar and Volker Schlecht

- Page count: 157 pages
- Publisher: Edition Büchergilde

Creative team
- Writer: Alexandra Kardinar; Volker Schlecht
- Artist: Alexandra Kardinar; Volker Schlecht

Original publication
- Date of publication: 1 September 2011
- Language: German
- ISBN: 978-3940111838

Das Fräulein von Scuderi is a 2011 comic book by the German duo Alexandra Kardinar and Volker Schlecht. It is based on the 1819 novella Mademoiselle de Scuderi by E. T. A. Hoffmann, which is retold through tableaux and pictograms. Hoffmann's original text is included at the end of the book. Set in 17th-century Paris, it follows the 73-year-old poet Madeleine de Scudéry as she becomes entangled in a wave of robbery-murders connected to a famous jeweler.

Katharina Granzin of Die Tageszeitung advised readers to read the original text before looking at the graphics. She called the book "a very individual artwork" which is not quite a graphic novel, but recalls a series of still images from a film, portraying the story's most important scenes. Pieke Biermann of Deutschlandfunk Kultur called the adaptation a bold and intelligent "sampled remake" of Hoffmann's story. She stressed the use of different graphic styles from different time periods, with many modern cultural references and subtle jokes, and collages that recall Monty Python's cutout animation.
