= Heidi Stroh =

German actress

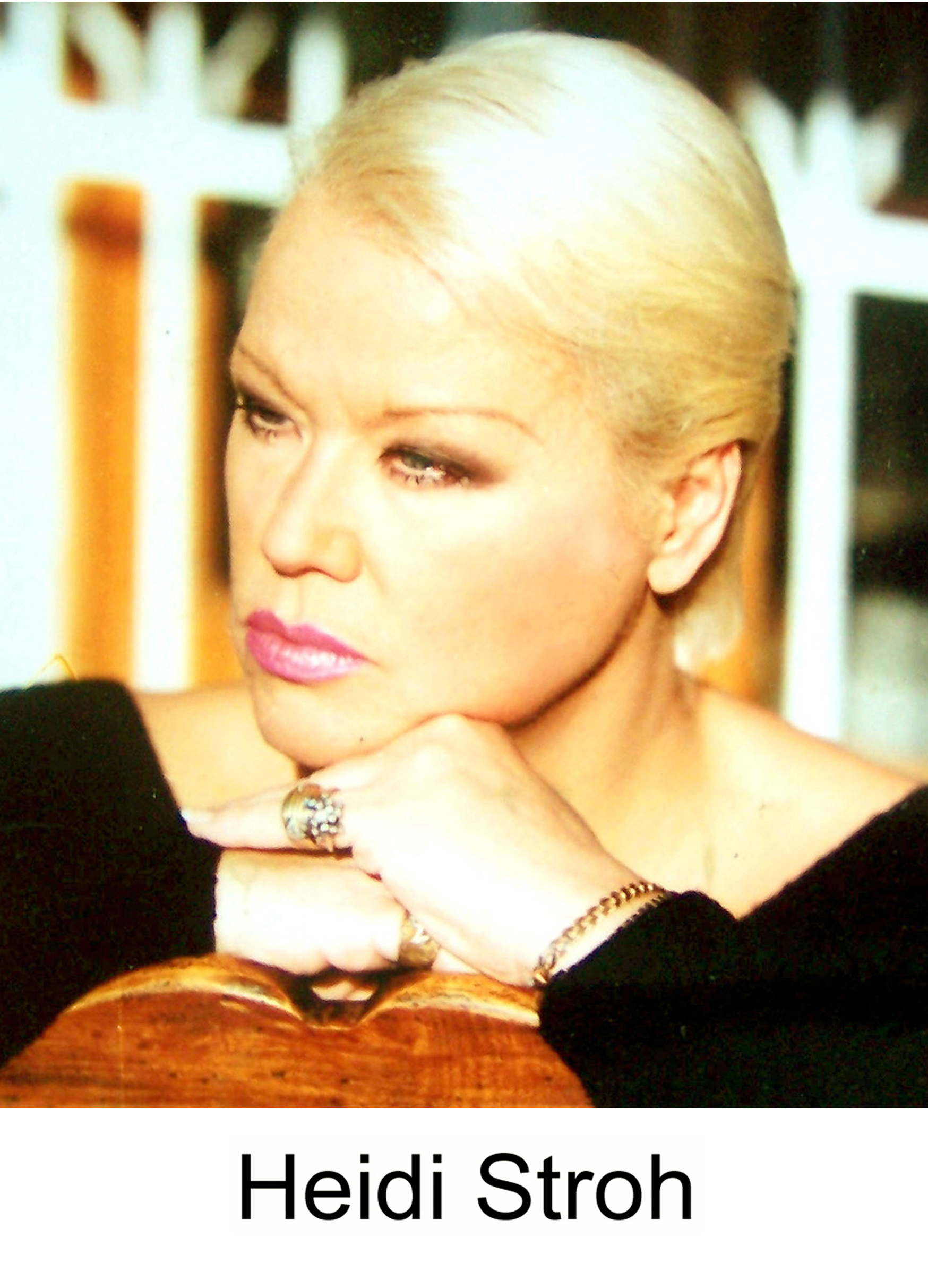
- Born: February 10, 1941; Jena, Thuringia, Germany
- Died: April 18, 2026 (aged 85); Liguria, Italy
- Occupation: Actress
- Years active: 1960-1992 (film & TV)

Heidi Stroh (10 February 1941 – 18 April 2026) was a German stage, film and television actress.

== Selected filmography ==
- Das Dorf ohne Moral (1960)
- Blood and Black Lace (1964)
- Cadavere a spasso (1965)
- Lust for Love (1967)
- A Matrimony (1968)
- The Cat Has Nine Lives (1968)
- Helgalein (1969)
- The Case of Lena Christ (1969, TV film)
- F.M.D. – Psychogramm eines Spielers (1971, TV film)
- Ohne Nachsicht (1972)
- The Stuff That Dreams Are Made Of (1972)
- MitGift (1976)
- Beautiful and Wild on Ibiza (1980)

== Bibliography ==
- Peter Cowie & Derek Elley. World Filmography: 1967. Fairleigh Dickinson University Press, 1977.
