= Die seltsamen Methoden des Franz Josef Wanninger =

- Starring: Beppo Brem
- Country of origin: Germany

Die seltsamen Methoden des Franz Josef Wanninger is a German television series that ran from 1965 to 1970, and then from 1978 to 1982.

== See also ==
- List of German television series
