= Albrecht Berblinger =

German aviation pioneer

- Born: Albrecht Ludwig Berblinger; 24 June 1770; Ulm, Württemberg
- Died: 28 January 1829 (aged 58); Ulm, Württemberg, German Confederation

Albrecht Ludwig Berblinger (24 June 1770 – 28 January 1829), also known as the Tailor of Ulm, was a German inventor and craftsman. He is famous for having constructed a working heavier-than-air flying machine, presumably a hang glider.

== Early life ==
Berblinger was the seventh child of a poor family. When he was 13, his father died and he was sent to an orphanage. There he was forced to become a tailor; although he wanted to become a watchmaker. He became a master craftsman at 21, but he still was interested in mechanics. In his spare time in 1808, he invented an artificial limb with a moveable joint for a soldier who had lost a leg.

== Flight attempts ==
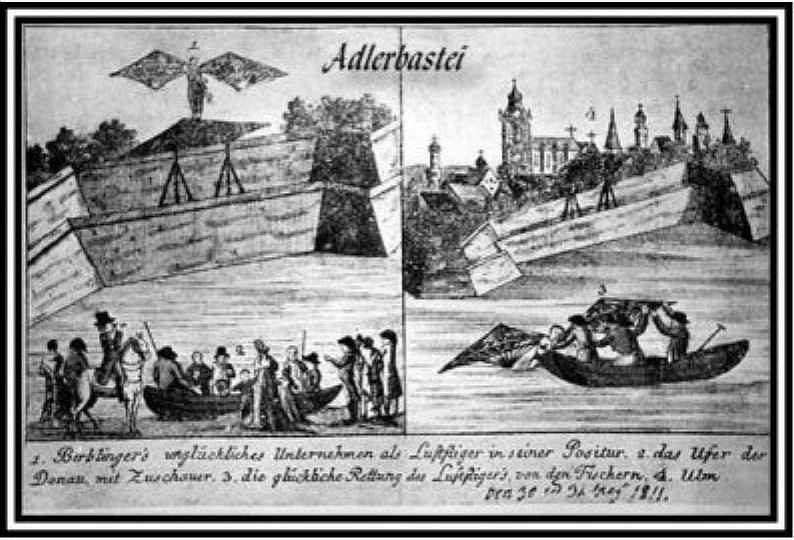
Contemporary drawing of the flight attempt

One of Berblinger's inventions was considered to be an early hang glider. He worked on it for years, improving it by watching the flight of owls. He was derided by many, and he was threatened with exclusion from the guild. He was ordered to pay a large fine for working outside of the guild, and the project cost him a considerable sum of money. King Frederick I of Württemberg became interested in his work and sponsored him with 20 Louis.

On the 30th May 1811, he tried to demonstrate the glider in the presence of the king, his three sons, and the crown prince of Bavaria. The king and a large number of citizens waited for the flight, but Berblinger cancelled it, claiming that a wing was damaged. The next day he made a second attempt from a higher location – the Adlerbastei (Eagles Bastion). The King had left, but his brother Duke Heinrich and the princes stayed to watch. Berblinger waited for a long time for a gust of wind. Eventually, a policeman gave him a push, and Berblinger fell into the Donau (Danube). Other accounts of this incident omit the policeman and contend that the cold Donau (Danube) and the temperature differential over it prevented the glider from lifting. He survived and was rescued by fishermen, but his reputation was ruined as a result, and his work suffered. He was 58 years old when he died in a hospital.

The story of the tailor who tried to fly subsequently resulted in some fleer and allusions in publications of the 19th century. Wilhelm Busch drew a man falling into a stream in his picture story "Max and Moritz", a reference to Berblinger's failed flight.

It was not until the end of the century that Otto Lilienthal proved the feasibility of heavier-than-air flight.

== Reception ==
- A reconstruction of Berblinger's flying device (in the form of a pair of wings) can be seen in the Ulm Rathaus (City Hall) suspended above the stairwell near the Standesamt (Registrary) where civil weddings are held. There is also another reconstruction of the glider at the ground level of building B in the Fachhochschule (University of Applied Science) Ulm.
- In 1986 it was proven that Berblinger's glider was capable of sustained flight, but it was almost impossible to cross the Danube, even with most modern gliders.
- Bertolt Brecht wrote a ballad about Berblinger in 1934.
- A commemorative medal was issued in 1928 depicting the event.
- The German Academy of Aviation Medicine (now the European School of Aviation Medicine) named an annual award for young scientists in his honor.

== See also ==
- The Tailor from Ulm, a 1979 German film relating the story of Berblinger's early flights.

== Notes ==
- (in German) berblinger.ulm.de
