= Gisela Elsner =

German writer (1937–1992)

- Born: 2 May 1937; Nuremberg, Germany
- Died: 13 May 1992 (aged 55); Munich, Germany
- Occupation: Writer
- Known for: dramatized in No Place to Go
- Political party: German Communist Party
- Movement: Group 47
- Children: Oskar Roehler
- Awards: Prix Formentor; 1964 Die Riesenzwerge

Gisela Elsner (2 May 1937 – 13 May 1992) was a German writer. She won the Prix Formentor in 1964 for her novel Die Riesenzwerge (The Giant Dwarfs).

== Early life ==
Elsner was born in Nuremberg, Middle Franconia. She was born to a well-to-do family, and grew up with her sister, Heidi, and brother, Richard. Her father was a Director at Siemens. She graduated from a gymnasium in Nuremberg in 1957. In 1959, she went to Vienna to study philosophy, Germanic letters and drama.

== Career ==
Elsner then lived as a freelance writer in various places: Lake Starnberg, Frankfurt, in Rome from 1963 to 1964, in London from 1964 to 1970, then in Paris, Hamburg, New York, and finally in Munich.

She was among the members of Group 47, which also included Günter Grass and Heinrich Böll.

In her 1970 novel Berührungsverbot (The Touch Ban or The Prohibition of Contact), several couples try to transcend the limits of the bourgeois sexual mores of their middle-class background by engaging in group sex orgies. In Switzerland, a journal that published excerpts from the novel was banned, and in Austria it was attacked as harmful to children.

Elsner described herself as a Leninist. She was a long lasting member of the German Communist Party. She was an ardent supporter of the government of East Germany, and left the German Communist Party in June 1989 due to their pro-Gorbachev tendencies. She returned to the party in October 1989 as a highly critical and "uncomfortable" member, as a display of her strong communist convictions.

Her political position was in lifelong conflict with her bourgeois upbringing.

== Personal life ==
Elsner married author Klaus Roehler in Planegg in 1958. They had a son together, Oskar Roehler, who was born in Starnberg in 1959. They later divorced, after Elsner left her husband and lost custody of her son.

She then remarried with Hans Platchek in 1976, who worked as a painter, art critic and author.

== Death and legacy ==
Elsner's mental health began to decline due to a mix of economic problems, lack of literary success, and loss of political perspective after the fall of the Berlin Wall. She became increasingly isolated. In 1992, Elsner was taken to a private medical clinic in Munich after collapsing on a public street. Elsner killed herself there on May 13, 1992.

A dramatized film about her life, No Place to Go, was made by her son Oskar Roehler.

Elsner's literary work is stored in the literary archives of the Monacensia, the literary archives of the city of Munich.

A literary prize, the "Gisela-Elsner-Literaturpreis" was established in her honor in 2021.

== Bibliography ==
- Triboll. Olten [u. a.] 1956 (zusammen mit Klaus Roehler)
- Die Riesenzwerge. Reinbek bei Hamburg 1964
- Der Nachwuchs. Reinbek bei Hamburg 1968
- Das Berührungsverbot. Reinbek bei Hamburg 1970, Neuauflage Verbrecher Verlag, Berlin, 2006, ISBN 978-3-935843-67-6
- Herr Leiselheimer und weitere Versuche, die Wirklichkeit zu bewältigen. München [u. a.] 1973
- Der Punktsieg. Reinbek bei Hamburg 1977
- Die Zerreißprobe. Reinbek bei Hamburg 1980
- Abseits. Reinbek bei Hamburg 1982
- Die Zähmung. Reinbek bei Hamburg 1984, Neuauflage Verbrecher Verlag, Berlin 2002, ISBN 978-3-935843-09-6
- Das Windei. Reinbek bei Hamburg 1987
- Friedenssaison. Hannover 1988 (Libretto; Musik: Christof Herzog)
- Gefahrensphären. Wien [u. a.] 1988
- Fliegeralarm. Wien [u. a.] 1989, in 2009 a corrected version, based upon the manuscript, was published as part of the collected works edition of the Verbrecher Verlag Berlin, ISBN 978-3-940426-23-9
- Wespen im Schnee. Berlin 2001 (zusammen mit Klaus Roehler)
- Heilig Blut. Verbrecher Verlag, Berlin 2007 (first German edition on the occasion of her 70th birthday. Geburtstag). ISBN 978-3-935843-82-9. First publication in Russian in the USSR (Raduga Verlag, Moskau 1987).
- Otto, der Grossaktionär. Verbrecher Verlag, Berlin 2008 (from a previously unpublished manuscript) ISBN 978-3-940426-09-3
- Flüche einer Verfluchten – Kritische Schriften I. Verbrecher Verlag, Berlin 2011, ISBN 978-3-940426-62-8
- Im literarischen Ghetto – Kritische Schriften II. Verbrecher Verlag, Berlin 2011, ISBN 978-3-940426-63-5
- Versuche, die Wirklichkeit zu bewältigen. Gesammelte Erzählungen Band 1. Verbrecher Verlag, Berlin 2012, ISBN 978-3-943167-04-7
- Zerreißproben. Gesammelte Erzählungen Band 2. Verbrecher Verlag, Berlin 2012, ISBN 978-3-943167-05-4
- Die teuflische Komödie. Verbrecher Verlag, Berlin 2016 (previously unpublished from an unfinished manuscrip ISBN 978-3-95732-118-3
