= The Tailor from Ulm =

1978 film

- Film poster
- Directed by: Edgar Reitz
- Written by: Petra Kiener; Edgar Reitz
- Starring: Tilo Prückner; Hannelore Elsner
- Cinematography: Dietrich Lohmann
- Production company: Edgar Reitz Film
- Distributed by: Filmverlag der Autoren
- Release date: 19 December 1978
- Running time: 120 minutes
- Country: West Germany
- Language: German

The Tailor from Ulm (German: Der Schneider von Ulm) is a 1978 West German drama film directed by Edgar Reitz, of Heimat fame. It is the true story of a German pioneer aviator, Albrecht Berblinger, in the late 18th century. It was entered into the 11th Moscow International Film Festival.

== Plot ==
The story begins in the countryside near Vienna in 1791. The protagonist sees a runaway hot-air balloon carrying a distressed lady who is crying for help. He pursues it, never having seen such a thing before. The lady's family look after him for a while in return for his part in the rescue and he reads a book concerning flight. He already has a fascination with birds and how they fly. Through the family, the Morettis from Italy, he meets an experimenter in human flight, Irma Moretti's fiancé, Jakob von Degen, and is invited to a public demonstration of his flying machine.

The story jumps two years forward and moves to Ulm where Albrecht works as a tailor. He and his new wife, appropriately plain for his station in life, are visited by the dashing Herr Degen, now married to the beautiful Irma whom Albrecht clearly likes. Their visit is brief as he is en route to the Champs de Mars in Paris to demonstrate his flying machine, which is pulled behind his coach on a specially designed cart.

Albrecht is in a tavern one evening when a man, Kaspar Fesslen, is thrown out for causing a disturbance by leafleting in the room. The leaflets say he has returned from Paris where he demonstrated a flying machine. Gossip describes him as a Jacobin sent to incite rebellion.

We now see Albrecht's own flying machine for the first time: a large wing-shaped glider. He falls off as he tries to fly it down the slope of a hill. His wife finds him injured and the glider damaged. Fesslen comes to visit him and finds him destroying his glider. He invites him back to his printshop and they discuss flight. He is invited to attend a meeting of the Jacobins. Involving himself with this rebel group he gets into trouble and has his house and goods confiscated. Fesslen is imprisoned. Albrecht breaks into his old workshop and rebuilds his flying machine. His tests are more successful but each ends in a crash.

The story jumps forward to the Napoleonic Wars and the siege of Ulm. Revolutionary sympathisers offer to financially support Albrecht in his research. He has his first fully successful flight from a local hill and manages to perform a safe landing. Fesslen is released and stays with Albrecht, dying soon after. Irma also appears one day as he practices. They announce a public performance of his machine on Pentecost. The local authorities ask him not to show the machine publicly, preferring to stage a display for the King of Wurrtemberg. Albrecht writes to invite Herr Degen to attend, which he does. He is determined to fly on the promised day despite pressure from many sides.

On the day though, in front of the king and a huge crowd, he is having to launch his flight not from the top of a hill as in all his previous attempts, but from a comparatively low platform on the town wall, and the wind is wrong. He is required to fly over the river. The crowd jeer at his delays. He jumps and lands in the river. He clambers out and the crowd chase him.

He evades them but collapses. He is found by soldiers and placed unconscious in a covered cart full of gilded but broken furniture. He wakes and crafts a makeshift periscope. He sees himself flying above.

== Cast ==
- Tilo Prückner as Albrecht Ludwig Berblinger
- Hannelore Elsner as Anna Berblinger, his wife
- Vadim Glowna as Kaspar Fesslen
- Harald Kuhlmann as Jakob von Degen
- Dieter Schidor as Schlumberger
- Rudolf Wessely as Monsieur Pointet
- Marie Colbin as Irma Moretti
- Herbert Prikopa as Kratzky
- Dana Medřická as Annas Mutter
- Otto Lackovič as Irma's father, Herr Moretti
- Michal Hofbauer as Fritz, a young boy helping Albrecht
- Ivan Vyskočil as Herr von Besserer
