= Der Neue Heimatfilm =

Austrian film festival

Der Neue Heimatfilm is an international 5-day film festival which takes place every year at the end of August in the town of Freistadt, Austria.

The festival, celebrating the genre of the "new Heimatfilm" (German pronunciation: [ˈhaɪmatˌfɪlm]), was held for the first time in 1988. Every year around 60 feature films, short films and documentaries from around the world are shown. In recent years the theme of identity, closely related to the term heimat – German for home or motherland – and often explored through the perspective of films about migration, has developed into a key focal point of the festival, but films telling stories of life and structural change in rural areas also feature heavily. The festival's director and founder is Wolfgang Steininger, who also founded the Linz Crossing Europe Film Festival in 2004.

Since 1998 a jury has presented the Freistadt Film Prize of 2500 euros to the best fiction film at the festival. In addition, since 2007 the Freistadt Documentary Film Prize of 1500 Euros has been awarded to the makers of the best documentary. The Freistadt Honorary Prize is also awarded for special services to the genre. Since 2025, the three awards – the Feature Film Award, the Documentary Film Award and the Youth Jury Award – each carry a cash prize of 3,000 euros, funded mainly by regional sponsors.

Concerts and exhibitions also feature as part of the festival programme. At the 2026 festival 56 films were shown, and a total of 4500 visitors attended.
