= Lust for Love (1967 film) =

1967 film

- Directed by: Edgar Reitz
- Written by: Edgar Reitz
- Produced by: Edgar Reitz
- Starring: Heidi Stroh; Georg Hauke; Ruth von Zerboni
- Cinematography: Thomas Mauch
- Edited by: Beate Mainka-Jellinghaus
- Music by: Edgar Reitz
- Production companies: Edgar Reitz Film; Kuratorium Junger Deutscher Film
- Distributed by: Constantin Film
- Release date: 21 March 1967
- Running time: 94 minutes
- Country: West Germany
- Language: German

Lust for Love (German: Mahlzeiten, lit. 'Meals') is a 1967 West German drama film directed by Edgar Reitz, starring Heidi Stroh and Georg Hauke. It tells the story of the marriage and subsequent crisis of a young female photographer and a medical student. It was the director's first fiction film and is part of the New German Cinema movement.

The film premiered in West Germany on 21 March 1967. It was shown in competition at the 28th Venice International Film Festival, where it won the award for Best First Work.

== Cast ==
- Heidi Stroh as Elisabeth
- Georg Hauke as Rolf
- Nina Frank as Irina
- Ruth von Zerboni as Rolfs Mutter
- Ilona Schütze as Ilona
- Dirk Borchert as friend
- Klaus Lackschewitz as friend
- Peter Hohberger as Brian Leak

== Bibliography ==
- Rother, Rainer (ed.) German Film: From the Archives of the Deutsche Kinemathek. Hatje Cantz Verlag, 2024.
