= Edgar Reitz =

German film director and producer

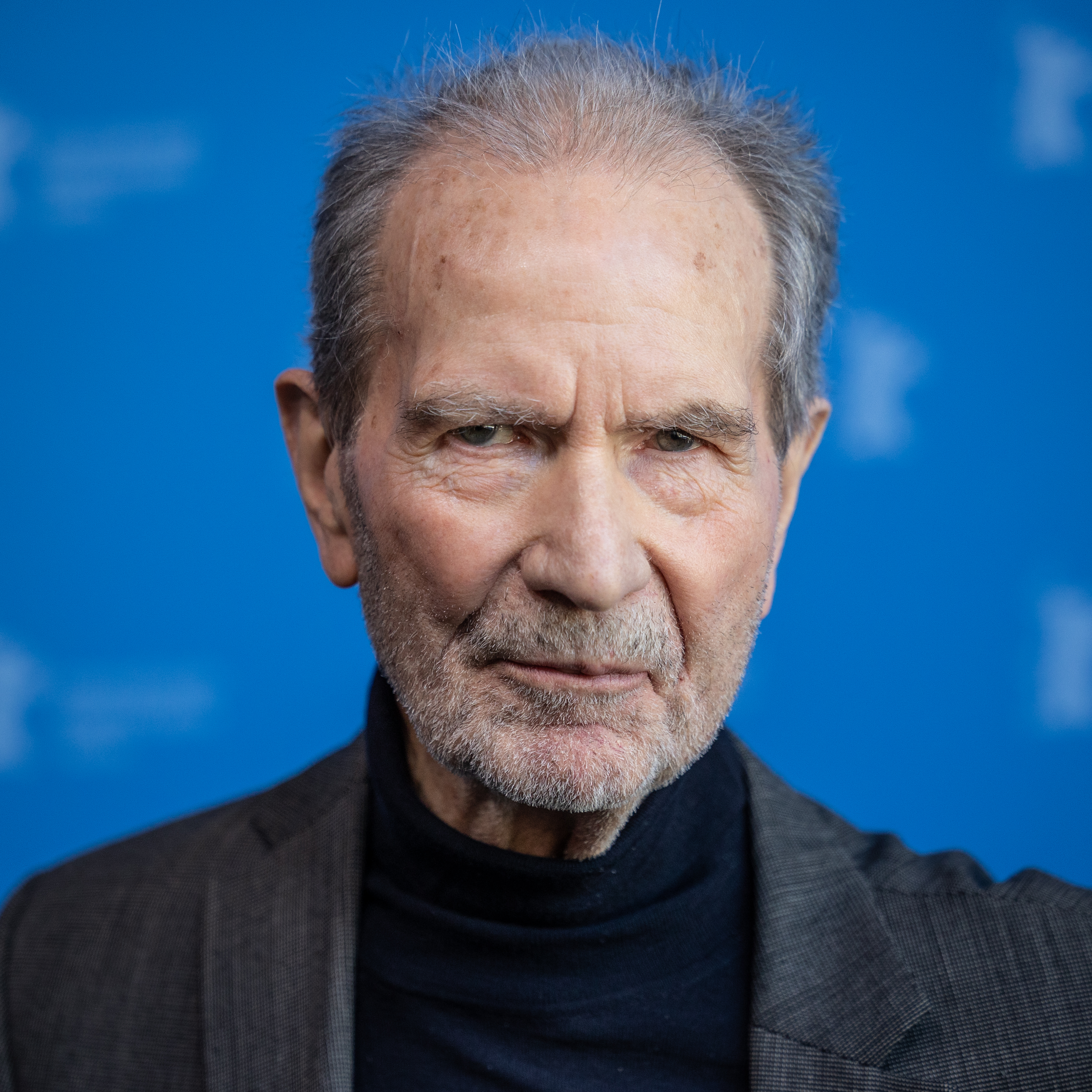
- Reitz in 2025
- Born: 1 November 1932 (age 93); Morbach, Prussia, Germany
- Occupations: Film director, producer, writer
- Years active: 1953–present
- Website: edgar-reitz.com

Signature
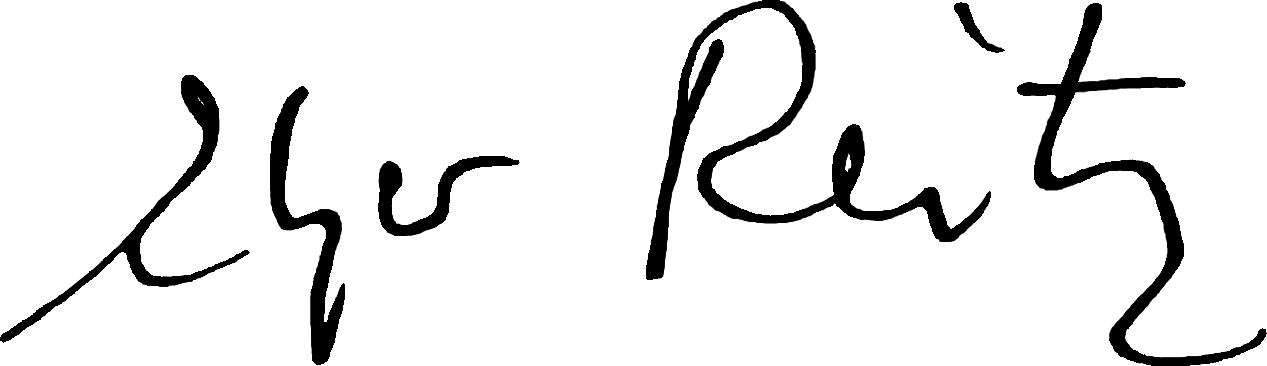

Edgar Reitz (born 1 November 1932) is a German filmmaker and Professor of Film at the Staatliche Hochschule für Gestaltung (State University of Design) in Karlsruhe. He is best-known for his internationally acclaimed Heimat film series (1984–2013).

== Early life and education ==
Reitz was born in Morbach, Hunsrück. His father Robert was a watchmaker and his business in Morbach was later taken over by Reitz's brother Guido. Reitz's interest in acting and producing plays began in his school years in Simmern, where he was encouraged by his German teacher Karl Windhäuser. After taking his Abitur, he studied German studies, journalism, art history and theatre studies at the Ludwig-Maximilians-Universität München from 1952. His first experiences in film-making however were not theoretical; he worked as a camera, editing, and production assistant from 1953.

His interests in the advancement of new developments in film went as far as he cooperated with Wolfgang Georgsdorf and his Osmodrama in 2016 which led to a complete scent synchronisation of his movie “home from home” which premiered as an allegedly well functioned cinema on 17 July 2016.

== Institut für Filmgestaltung ==
In 1963 along with Alexander Kluge he founded the Institut für Filmgestaltung (Institute for Film Design) which was affiliated to the Ulm School of Design, where he taught film directing and camera theory until the School of Design closed in 1968. As part of the group around Kluge, Reitz was a participant in the Oberhausen Manifesto which was announced at the Oberhausen Short Film Festival of 1962. With this manifesto young German filmmakers demanded nothing less than a new form of cinema: "Der alte Film ist tot. Wir glauben an den neuen." ("The old film is dead. We believe in the new film"). The manifesto is associated with the motto "Papas Kino ist tot" ("Papa's cinema is dead"). Subsequently, the concept of the auteur gained in popularity in Germany, and Reitz played a significant role in shaping this concept in the following years.

== Awards ==
Reitz received one of his first awards for his film Mahlzeiten which was awarded the prize for best debut work at the Venice Film Festival in 1967. In 1971, he founded Edgar Reitz Filmproduktion (ERF) in Munich. He now began to collaborate on films with his former academic colleague Alexander Kluge amongst them the 1974 fictitious documentary In Gefahr und größter Not bringt der Mittelweg den Tod. The lavish production costs of the 1979 film The Tailor of Ulm, which portrays the downfall of the aviation pioneer Albrecht Berblinger, caused Reitz's own financial circumstances to suffer. The film was entered into the 11th Moscow International Film Festival. It was during this crisis that the idea for a film project about his homeland, the Hunsrück, first came to Reitz. What began as an attempt at self-discovery, ultimately broadened out into the Heimat trilogy (from 1984), which met with critical acclaim, an enthusiastic international audience, and numerous prizes. With this epic and monumental production, Reitz achieved a quite new perspective, an approach, both poetical and realistic, to the past of Germany as it might have played out in the provinces.

In 2004 Reitz was awarded the Carl Zuckmayer Medal by the state of Rhineland-Palatinate for his life's work. In the same year, he received the Master of Cinema Award of the International Filmfestival Mannheim-Heidelberg. Reitz is married to the singer and actress Salome Kammer (who appeared in Heimats 2 and 3) and lives in Munich.

In 2025, Reitz was honoured at the 20th Rome Film Festival with the Master of Film Award.

He is an atheist.

== Selected filmography ==
- Lust for Love (Mahlzeiten) (1967)
- Cardillac (1970)
- Trip to Vienna (Die Reise nach Wien) (1973)
- In Danger and Deep Distress, the Middleway Spells Certain Death (In Gefahr und größter Not bringt der Mittelweg den Tod) (1974) (co-director: Alexander Kluge)
- Zero Hour (Stunde Null) (1977)
- "Grenzstation" in Germany in Autumn (Deutschland im Herbst) (1978)
- The Tailor from Ulm (Der Schneider von Ulm) (1978)
- Heimat (1984, TV series)
- Home from Home (Die andere Heimat) (2013)
- Leibniz- Chronicle of a Lost Painting (2025)

=== Miscellaneous ===
- Eight Hundred Times Lonely (800 Mal Einsam – Ein Tag mit dem Filmemacher Edgar Reitz) (2019), film portrait of Edgar Reitz by the German filmmaker Anna Hepp
- Filmstunde 23 Subject: Filmmaking

== Sources ==
This article is derived principally from the German Wikipedia article of the same name and the sources listed there.
