= Oskar Roehler =

German film director

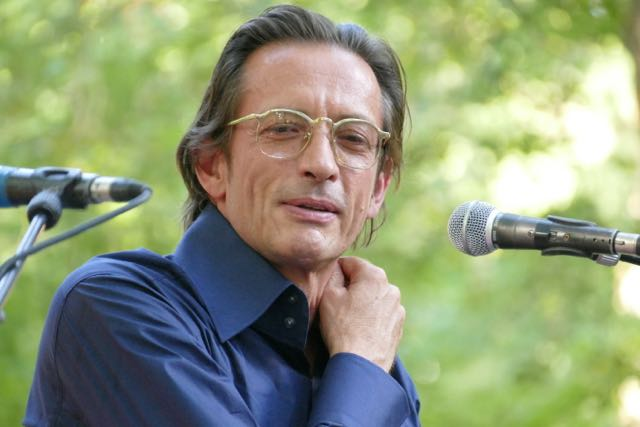
- Roehler in 2015
- Born: 21 January 1959 (age 66); Starnberg, West Germany
- Occupation(s): Film director, screenwriter, journalist
- Years active: 1980s–present

Oskar Roehler (born 21 January 1959) is a German film director, screenwriter and journalist. He was born in Starnberg, the son of writers Gisela Elsner and Klaus Roehler. Since the mid-1980s, he has been working as a screenwriter, for, among others, Niklaus Schilling, Christoph Schlingensief and Mark Schlichter. Since the early 1990s, he has also been working as a film director. For his film No Place to Go he won the Deutscher Filmpreis. His 2010 film Jew Suss: Rise and Fall was nominated for the Golden Bear at the 60th Berlin International Film Festival.

== Partial filmography ==
- Gentleman (1995)
- Silvester Countdown (1997)
- Gierig (1999)
- Latin Lover (1999, TV film)
- No Place to Go (2000)
- Suck My Dick (2001)
- Beloved Sister (2002, TV film)
- Angst (2003)
- Agnes and His Brothers (2004)
- The Elementary Particles (2006)
- Lulu and Jimi (2009)
- Jew Suss: Rise and Fall (2010)
- Sources of Life (2013)
- Punk Berlin 1982 (2015)
- Subs (2017)
- Enfant Terrible (2020)
- Bad Director (2024)
