= German Film Award for Best Director =

- Awarded for: Excellence in Cinematic Direction
- Country: Germany
- Presented by: Deutsche Filmakademie
- First award: Josef von Báky; Two Times Lotte (1951)
- Currently held by: Mascha Schilinski; Sound of Falling (2026)
- Website: deutscher-filmpreis.de

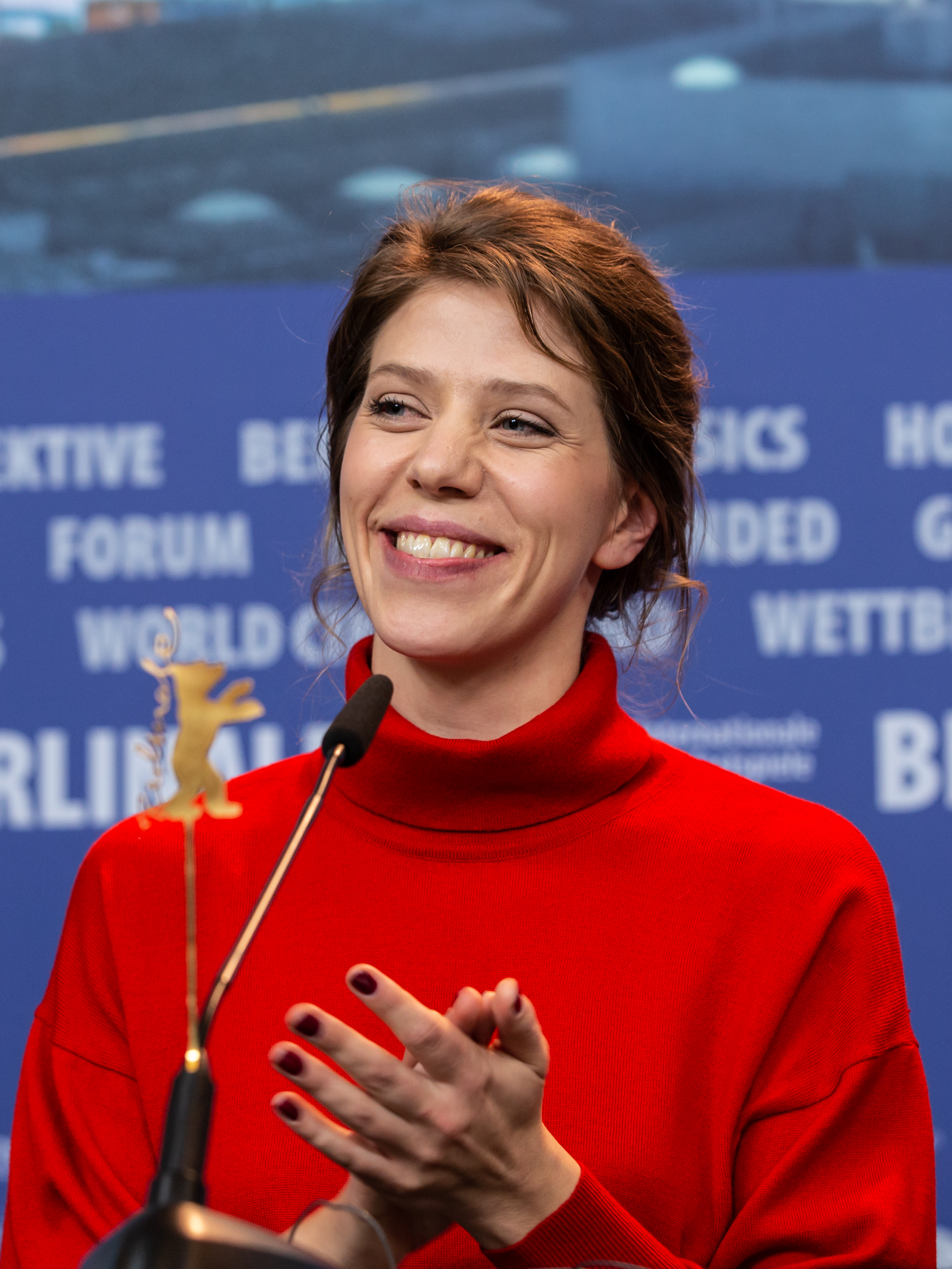
Film director Nora Fingscheidt at the Berlinale 2019

The German Film Award for Best Director recognizes a film director who has exhibited outstanding directing while working in the German film industry.

== Multiple wins and nominations ==
The following individuals received two or more Best Director awards:

Wins	Director
4	Bernhard Wicki
3	Andreas Dresen
3	Volker Schlöndorff
3	Werner Schroeter
3	Wim Wenders
2	Fatih Akin
2	Helmut Dietl
2	Rainer Werner Fassbinder
2	Helmut Käutner
2	Peter Lilienthal
2	Johannes Schaaf
2	Tom Tykwer

The following individuals received three or more Best Director nominations:

Nominations	Director
7	Andreas Dresen
6	Tom Tykwer
5	Dominik Graf
5	Christian Petzold
5	Wim Wenders
4	Fatih Akin
4	Volker Schlöndorff
4	Bernhard Wicki

== All winners and nominees ==
=== 1956-1996 ===
Year	Winner	English title	Original title
1951	Josef von Báky	Two Times Lotte	Das doppelte Lottchen
1952	Award not given		
1953	Rudolf Jugert	Nights on the Road (aka The Mistress)	Nachts auf den Straßen
1954	Helmut Käutner	The Last Bridge	Die letzte Brücke
1955	Alfred Weidenmann	Canaris	
1956	Award not given		
1957	Helmut Käutner	The Captain from Köpenick	Der Hauptmann von Köpenick
1958	Robert Siodmak	The Devil Strikes at Night	Nachts, wenn der Teufel kam
1959	Frank Wisbar	Stalingrad: Dogs, Do You Want to Live Forever? (aka Battle Inferno)	Hunde, wollt ihr ewig leben
1960	Bernhard Wicki	The Bridge	Die Brücke
1961– 1964	Award not given		
1965	Kurt Hoffmann	The House in Karp Lane	Das Haus in der Karpfengasse
1966	Ulrich Schamoni	It	Es
1966	Volker Schlöndorff	Young Törless	Der junge Törless
1967	Alexander Kluge	Yesterday Girl	Abschied von gestern (Anita G.)
1968	Johannes Schaaf	Tattoo	Tätowierung
1969	Peter Zadek	I'm an Elephant, Madame	Ich bin ein Elefant, Madame
1970	Award not given		
1971	Michael Fengler, Rainer Werner Fassbinder	Why Does Herr R. Run Amok?	Warum läuft Herr R. Amok?
1971	Volker Schlöndorff	The Sudden Wealth of the Poor People of Kombach	Der plötzliche Reichtum der armen Leute von Kombach
1972	Johannes Schaaf	Trotta	
1972	Bernhard Wicki	Weights and Measures	Das falsche Gewicht
1973	Award not given		
1974	Roland Klick	Supermarket	Supermarkt
1975	Wim Wenders	The Wrong Move	Falsche Bewegung
1976	Award not given		
1977	Volker Schlöndorff	Coup de Grâce	Der Fangschuß
1978	Rainer Werner Fassbinder	Despair	Despair – Eine Reise ins Licht
1978	Wim Wenders	The American Friend	Der amerikanische Freund
1979	Rainer Werner Fassbinder	The Marriage of Maria Braun	Die Ehe der Maria Braun
1979	Werner Schroeter	The Reign of Naples	Neapolitanische Geschwister
1980	Heidi Genée	1+1=3 [de]	
1981	Walter Bockmayer; Rolf Bührmann	Looping	
1982	Werner Schroeter	Day of the Idiots	Tag der Idioten
1983	Peter Lilienthal	Dear Mr. Wonderful	
1983	Lutz Konermann	Aufdermauer	
1984	Josef Rusnak	Cold Fever	Kaltes Fieber
1984	Uwe Schrader	White Trash	Kanakerbraut
1985	Maria Knilli	Dear Karl	Lieber Karl
1985	Bernhard Wicki	Grünstein's Clever Move	Die Grünstein-Variante
1986	Hans-Jürgen Syberberg	Die Nacht	
1987	Peter Lilienthal	The Silence of the Poet	
1988	Dominik Graf	The Cat	Die Katze
1989	Maria Theresia Wagner	Die Nacht des Marders	
1990	Uli Edel	Last Exit to Brooklyn	Letzte Ausfahrt Brooklyn
1990	Bernhard Wicki	Spider's Web	Das Spinnennetz
1991	Werner Schroeter	Malina	
1992	Helmut Dietl	Schtonk!	
1993	Adolf Winkelmann	North Curve	Nordkurve
1994	Peter Sehr	Kaspar Hauser	

=== 1990s ===
Year	Winners and nominees	English title	Original title
1995	Sönke Wortmann	Maybe… Maybe Not	Der bewegte Mann
1995	Doris Dörrie	Nobody Loves Me	Keiner liebt mich
1995	Dominik Graf	The Invincibles	Die Sieger
1996	Romuald Karmakar	Deathmaker	Der Totmacher
1996	Rainer Kaufmann	Talk of the Town	Stadtgespräch
1996	Dani Levy	Silent Night	Stille Nacht
1997	Helmut Dietl	Rossini	Rossini – oder die mörderische Frage, wer mit wem schlief
1997	Caroline Link	Beyond Silence	Jenseits der Stille
1997	Roland Suso Richter	14 Days to Life	14 Tage lebenslänglich
1998	Wim Wenders	The End of Violence	Am Ende der Gewalt
1998	Tom Tykwer	Winter Sleepers	Winterschläfer
1998	Joseph Vilsmaier	The Harmonists	Comedian Harmonists
1999	Tom Tykwer	Run Lola Run	Lola rennt
1999	Fatih Akın	Short Sharp Shock	Kurz und schmerzlos
1999	Andreas Dresen	Nightshapes	Nachtgestalten

=== 2000s ===
Year	Winners and nominees	English title	Original title
2000	Pepe Danquart	Heimspiel	
2000	Veit Helmer	Tuvalu	
2000	Wim Wenders	The Million Dollar Hotel	
2001	Esther Gronenborn	Alaska.de	
2001	Christian Petzold	The State I Am In	Die innere Sicherheit
2001	Tom Tykwer	The Princess and the Warrior	Der Krieger und die Kaiserin
2002	Caroline Link	Nowhere in Africa	Jenseits von Afrika
2002	Andreas Dresen	Grill Point	Halbe Treppe
2002	Dominik Graf	A Map of the Heart	Der Felsen
2003	Wolfgang Becker	Good Bye, Lenin!	
2003	Hans-Christian Schmid	Distant Lights	Lichter
2003	Tony Wigand	The Flying Classroom	Das fliegende Klassenzimmer
2004	Fatih Akın	Head-On	Gegen die Wand
2004	Christian Petzold	Wolfsburg	
2004	Sönke Wortmann	The Miracle of Bern	Das Wunder von Bern
2005	Dani Levy	Go for Zucker	Alles auf Zucker!
2005	Hans Weingartner	The Edukators	Die fetten Jahre sind vorbei
2005	Volker Schlöndorff	The Ninth Day	Der neunte Tag
2006	Florian Henckel von Donnersmarck	The Lives of Others	Das Leben der Anderen
2006	Andreas Dresen	Summer in Berlin	Sommer vorm Balkon
2006	Hans-Christian Schmid	Requiem	
2007	Marcus H. Rosenmüller	Grave Decisions	Wer früher stirbt, ist länger tot
2007	Matthias Glasner	The Free Will	Der freie Wille
2007	Chris Kraus	Four Minutes	Vier Minuten
2007	Tom Tykwer	Perfume: The Story of a Murderer	Das Parfum - Die Geschichte eines Mörders
2008	Fatih Akın	The Edge of Heaven	Auf der anderen Seite
2008	Doris Dörrie	Cherry Blossoms	Hanami - Kirschblüten
2008	Christian Petzold	Yella	
2009	Andreas Dresen	Cloud Nine	Wolke Neun
2009	Uli Edel	The Baader Meinhof Complex	Der Baader Meinhof Komplex
2009	Florian Gallenberger	John Rabe	
2009	Christian Petzold	Jerichow	

=== 2010s ===
Year	Winners and nominees	English title
2010	Michael Haneke	The White Ribbon
2010	Maren Ade	Everyone Else
2010	Feo Aladag	When We Leave
2010	Hans-Christian Schmid	Storm
2011	Tom Tykwer	Three
2011	Florian Cossen	The Day I Was Not Born
2011	Wim Wenders	Pina
2012	Andreas Dresen	Stopped on Track
2012	Christian Petzold	Barbara
2012	Hans Weingartner	Hut in the Woods
2013	Jan-Ole Gerster	A Coffee in Berlin
2013	Margarethe von Trotta	Hannah Arendt
2013	Lana Wachowski, Tom Tykwer, Andy Wachowski	Cloud Atlas
2014	Edgar Reitz	Home from Home
2014	Andreas Prochaska	The Dark Valley
2014	Katrin Gebbe	Nothing Bad Can Happen
2015	Sebastian Schipper	Victoria
2015	Edward Berger	Jack
2015	Dominik Graf	Beloved Sisters
2015	Johannes Naber	Age of Cannibals
2016	Lars Kraume	The People vs. Fritz Bauer
2016	Maria Schrader	Stefan Zweig: Farewell to Europe
2016	David Wnendt	Look Who's Back
2017	Maren Ade	Toni Erdmann
2017	Anne Zohra Berrached	24 Weeks
2017	Chris Kraus	The Bloom of Yesterday
2017	Nicolette Krebitz	Wild
2018	Emily Atef	3 Days in Quiberon
2018	Fatih Akin	In the Fade
2018	Valeska Grisebach	Western
2019	Andreas Dresen	Gundermann
2019	Wolfgang Fischer	Styx
2019	Caroline Link	All About Me

=== 2020s ===
Year	Winners and nominees	English title
2020	Nora Fingscheidt	System Crasher
2020	İlker Çatak	I Was, I Am, I Will Be
2020	Burhan Qurbani	Berlin Alexanderplatz
2021	Maria Schrader	I'm Your Man
2021	Dominik Graf	Fabian: Going to the Dogs
2021	Maria Speth	Herr Bachmann und seine Klasse
2022	Andreas Kleinert	Dear Thomas
2022	Andreas Dresen	Rabiye Kurnaz vs. George W. Bush
2022	Sebastian Meise	Great Freedom
2023	İlker Çatak	The Teachers' Lounge
2023	Ali Abbasi	Holy Spider
2023	Edward Berger	All Quiet on the Western Front
2023	Sonja Heiss	Wann wird es endlich wieder so, wie es nie war
2024	Ayşe Polat	In the Blind Spot
2024	Matthias Glasner	Dying
2024	Timm Kröger	The Universal Theory
