= German Film Award for Best Fiction Film =

German film award

The German Film Award for Best Fiction Film (German: Bester Spielfilm) is the main award given for best German film at the annual Deutscher Filmpreis awards, the German national film awards. It has been held annually since 1951 in varying formats. As the constitution said the prize was only awarded, if outstanding achievement was given, not every year a film was declared the winner of the prize. For the first three years, the Golden Candlestick was the highest honour for this category. It was then replaced by the Golden Bowl as a Challenge Prize, that would be passed to the winner of the next occasion, however as it was not given out for 17 years, the prize was abandoned for good in 1996. Regular prize winners receive a Film Award in Gold whereas the runners-up receive a silver award. A bronze award for the second runner-up was introduced in 2008. On some occasions, no film received the gold prize and a winner of the Silver Award was declared the best film of the year.

== List of winning films ==
=== 1951–1986 ===
From 1951 to 1986 the prize was awarded by a commission which selected the best German feature film released in the previous 12 months.

Year	English title	Original title	Director(s)	Trophy received
1951	Two Times Lotte	Das doppelte Lottchen	Josef von Báky	Golden Candlestick
1952	No award given.			
1953	Nights on the Road aka The Mistress	Nachts auf den Straßen	Rudolf Jugert	Golden Candlestick
1954	No Way Back	Weg ohne Umkehr	Victor Vicas	Golden Bowl
1955	Canaris: Master Spy	Canaris	Alfred Weidenmann	Golden Bowl
1956	No award given.			
1957	The Captain from Köpenick	Der Hauptmann von Köpenick	Helmut Käutner	Golden Bowl
1958	The Devil Strikes at Night	Nachts, wenn der Teufel kam	Robert Siodmak	Golden Bowl
1959	Arms and the Man	Helden	Franz Peter Wirth	Golden Bowl
1960	The Bridge	Die Brücke	Bernhard Wicki	Golden Bowl
1961	No award given.			
1962	The Bread of Those Early Years	Das Brot der frühen Jahre	Herbert Vesely	Film Award in Silver
1963	The Endless Night	Die endlose Nacht	Will Tremper	Film Award in Silver
1963	The Lightship	Das Feuerschiff	Ladislao Vajda	Film Award in Silver
1964	The River Line	Kennwort... Reiher	Rudolf Jugert	Film Award in Gold
1965	The House in Karp Lane	Das Haus in der Karpfengasse	Kurt Hoffmann	Film Award in Gold
1966	Young Törless	Der junge Törless	Volker Schlöndorff	Film Award in Gold
1967	Yesterday Girl	Abschied von gestern	Alexander Kluge	Film Award in Gold
1968	Tattoo	Tätowierung	Johannes Schaaf	Film Award in Gold
1969	Artists Under the Big Top: Perplexed	Die Artisten in der Zirkuskuppel: Ratlos	Alexander Kluge	Film Award in Gold
1970	Katzelmacher		Rainer Werner Fassbinder	Film Award in Gold
1970	Malatesta		Peter Lilienthal	Film Award in Gold
1971	First Love		Maximilian Schell	Film Award in Gold
1971	Lenz		George Moorse	Film Award in Gold
1972	Trotta		Johannes Schaaf	Film Award in Gold
1972	Ludwig: Requiem for a Virgin King		Hans-Jürgen Syberberg	Film Award in Gold
1973	The Experts	Die Sachverständigen	Norbert Kückelmann	Golden Bowl
1974	The Pedestrian	Der Fußgänger	Maximilian Schell	Golden Bowl
1975	Lina Braake		Bernhard Sinkel	Film Award in Silver
1976	Calm Prevails Over the Country	Es herrscht Ruhe im Land	Peter Lilienthal	Golden Bowl
1977	Heinrich		Helma Sanders-Brahms	Golden Bowl
1978	The Glass Cell	Die gläserne Zelle	Hans W. Geißendörfer	Film Award in Gold
1979	The Tin Drum	Die Blechtrommel	Volker Schlöndorff	Golden Bowl
1980	The Last Years of Childhood	Die letzten Jahre der Kindheit	Norbert Kückelmann	Film Award in Silver
1981	A Lot of Bills to Pay	Jede Menge Kohle	Adolf Winkelmann	Film Award in Gold
1982	Marianne and Juliane	Die bleierne Zeit	Margarethe von Trotta	Film Award in Gold
1983	The State of Things	Der Stand der Dinge	Wim Wenders	Film Award in Gold
1984	Where the Green Ants Dream	Wo die grünen Ameisen träumen	Werner Herzog	Film Award in Gold
1985	Colonel Redl	Oberst Redl	István Szabó	Film Award in Gold

=== 1986–present ===
Year	English title	Original title	Director(s)
1986	Rosa Luxemburg		Margarethe von Trotta
1987	No Golden Award was given.		
1988	Wings of Desire	Der Himmel über Berlin	Wim Wenders
1989	Yasemin		Hark Bohm
1990	Last Exit to Brooklyn	Letzte Ausfahrt Brooklyn	Uli Edel
1991	Malina		Werner Schroeter
1992	Schtonk!		Helmut Dietl
1993	No Golden Award was given.		
1994	Kaspar Hauser		Peter Sehr
1995	Maybe... Maybe Not	Der bewegte Mann	Sönke Wortmann
1996	Deathmaker	Der Totmacher	Romuald Karmakar
1997	Rossini	Rossini – oder die mörderische Frage, wer mit wem schlief	Helmut Dietl
1998	The Harmonists	Comedian Harmonists	Joseph Vilsmaier
1999	Run Lola Run	Lola rennt	Tom Tykwer
2000	No Place to Go	Die Unberührbare	Oskar Roehler
2001	The State I Am In	Die innere Sicherheit	Christian Petzold
2002	Nowhere in Africa	Nirgendwo in Afrika	Caroline Link
2003	Good Bye, Lenin!		Wolfgang Becker
2004	Head-On	Gegen die Wand	Fatih Akın
2005	Go for Zucker	Alles auf Zucker!	Dani Levy
2006	The Lives of Others	Das Leben der Anderen	Florian Henckel von Donnersmarck
2007	Four Minutes	Vier Minuten	Chris Kraus
2008	The Edge of Heaven	Auf der anderen Seite	Fatih Akın
2009	John Rabe		Florian Gallenberger
2010	The White Ribbon	Das weiße Band	Michael Haneke
2011	Vincent Wants to Sea	Vincent will Meer	Ralf Huettner
2012	Stopped on Track	Halt auf freier Strecke	Andreas Dresen
2013	A Coffee in Berlin	Oh Boy	Jan-Ole Gerster
2014	Home from Home	Die andere Heimat - Chronik einer Sehnsucht	Edgar Reitz
2015	Victoria	Victoria	Sebastian Schipper
2016	The People vs. Fritz Bauer	Der Staat gegen Fritz Bauer	Lars Kraume
2017	Toni Erdmann	Toni Erdmann	Maren Ade
2018	3 Days in Quiberon	3 Tage in Quiberon	Emily Atef
2019	Gundermann	Gundermann	Andreas Dresen
2020	System Crasher	Systemsprenger	Nora Fingscheidt
2021	I'm Your Man	Ich bin dein Mensch	Maria Schrader
2022	Dear Thomas	Lieber Thomas	Andreas Kleinert
2023	The Teachers' Lounge	Das Lehrerzimmer	İlker Çatak
2024	Dying	Sterben	Matthias Glasner
2025	September 5	September 5	Tim Fehlbaum
2026	Ach, diese Lücke, diese entsetzliche Lücke		Simon Verhoeven
