= List of German submissions for the Academy Award for Best International Feature Film =

Best International Feature Film submissions from Germany
- Formerly called: West Germany (1956–1990)

Highlights
- Debut: 1956 (as West Germany); 1990 (as Germany)
- Submissions: 36 (as Germany); 31 (as West Germany); 67 (overall)
- Nominations: 14 (as Germany); 8 (as West Germany); 22 (overall)
- Oscar winners: 3 (as Germany); 1 (as West Germany); 4 (overall)^{[f]}

Germany has submitted films for the Academy Award for Best International Feature Film (Note: The category was previously named the Academy Award for Best Foreign Language Film, but this was changed to the Academy Award for Best International Feature Film in April 2019, after the Academy deemed the word "Foreign" to be outdated.) since the creation of the award in 1956, initially as a divided country, and since 1992 as a reunified federation. The award is handed out annually by the U.S.-based Academy of Motion Picture Arts and Sciences to a feature-length motion picture produced outside the United States that contains primarily non-English dialogue.

As of 2026, Germany received twenty-two nominations, winning four awards for: The Tin Drum (1979) by Volker Schlöndorff, Nowhere in Africa (2001) by Caroline Link, The Lives of Others (2006) by Florian Henckel von Donnersmarck and All Quiet on the Western Front (2022) by Edward Berger.

== Submissions ==
Each year, the Academy invites countries to submit their best films for competition according to strict rules, with only one film being accepted from each country. However, because of Germany's status as a divided country throughout much of the second half of the 20th century, West Germany and East Germany competed separately in the Best Foreign Language Film category until 1990. With eight nominations and one win, West Germany was far more successful than East Germany, whose only nomination was received in 1976 for Jacob the Liar, a film which the Moscow International Film Festival had refused to screen. West Germany received four consecutive nominations during the first years of the award's existence. It fared less well in the 1960s, as all of its submissions failed to garner a nomination. The advent of New German Cinema led to an improvement of German cinema's reputation abroad. As a result of this, West Germany received several nominations during the 1970s, culminating with The Tin Drum's victory in 1979.

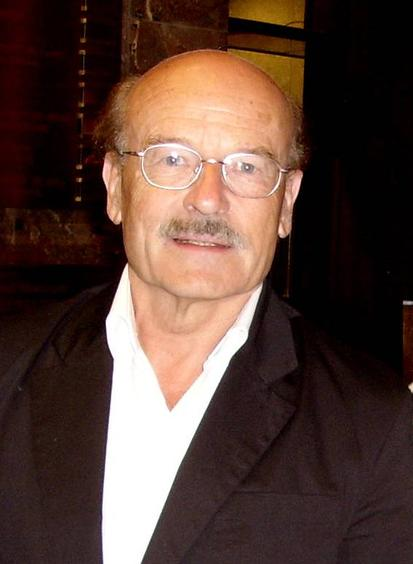
Volker Schlöndorff was the first German filmmaker to win the category, for The Tin Drum (1979).

According to Academy rules, the selection of each country's official submission has to be made by "one organization, jury or committee that should include artists and/or craftspeople from the field of motion pictures". In Germany's case, the selection committee and procedure are organized by the Munich-based German Films Service + Marketing GmbH, known as Export-Union of German Cinema until 2004. Film producers and distributors can submit a film for consideration to German Films, which verifies the completeness of the application and the compliance with Academy rules. A committee composed of representatives of nine different German film institutions and film industry trade groups selects a film for submission to the Academy.^{[b]} German Films is not represented in the committee and concentrates solely on the organizational aspects.

Although East Germany used to submit films sparingly, West Germany and later reunified Germany have been regular participants, and have sent a film to the Academy in every year except from 1962 to 1964 and in 1991. West Germany and East Germany were formally reunited on 3 October 1990. The 63rd Academy Awards, held on 25 March 1991, were thus the first at which Germany was able to participate as a single country. The refusal of the selection committee to submit a film in 1991 was highly controversial.^{[c]}

Reunified Germany has been successful in the Best International Feature Film category, securing three wins and ten nominations in three decades. The three German films that received the award since reunification are All Quiet on the Western Front (2022) by Edward Berger, The Lives of Others (2006) by Florian Henckel von Donnersmarck and Nowhere in Africa (2001) by Caroline Link. Donnersmarck and Link are the only two German directors to have had more than one film selected and nominated in this category. Several other German films have received Academy Awards in categories other than Best International Feature Film.

The selection of The White Ribbon (2009) caused a minor controversy, since Michael Haneke is an Austrian filmmaker.^{[d]}

Pina (2011), Two Lives (2013), Labyrinth of Lies (2015), In the Fade (2017), I'm Your Man (2021), and Sound of Falling (2025), advanced to the December shortlists, but were not nominated.

All submissions were primarily in German, with the notable exception of The Seed of the Sacred Fig (2024) by Mohammad Rasoulof, a co-production with Iran shot in Persian, and nominated at the 97th Academy Awards.

=== Federal Republic of Germany (since 1949) ===
Year^{[e]} (Ceremony)	Film title used in nomination	Original title	Director	Result
As West Germany (1949–1990)
1956 (29th)	The Captain of Köpenick	Der Hauptmann von Köpenick	Helmut Käutner	Nominated
1957 (30th)	The Devil Strikes at Night	Nachts, wenn der Teufel kam	Robert Siodmak	Nominated
1958 (31st)	Arms and the Man	Helden	Franz Peter Wirth	Nominated
1959 (32nd)	The Bridge	Die Brücke	Bernhard Wicki	Nominated
1960 (33rd)	Faust		Peter Gorski	Not nominated
1961 (34th)	The Miracle of Father Malachia	Das Wunder des Malachias	Bernhard Wicki	Not nominated
1965 (38th)	It	Es	Ulrich Schamoni	Not nominated
1966 (39th)	Young Törless	Der junge Törless	Volker Schlöndorff	Not nominated
1967 (40th)	Tattoo	Tätowierung	Johannes Schaaf	Not nominated
1968 (41st)	Artists Under the Big Top: Perplexed	Die Artisten in der Zirkuskuppel: ratlos	Alexander Kluge	Not nominated
1969 (42nd)	Hunting Scenes from Bavaria	Jagdszenen aus Niederbayern	Peter Fleischmann	Not nominated
1970 (43rd)	o.k.		Michael Verhoeven	Not nominated
1971 (44th)	The Castle	Das Schloß	Rudolf Noelte	Not nominated
1972 (45th)	Trotta		Johannes Schaaf	Not nominated
1973 (46th)	The Pedestrian	Der Fußgänger	Maximilian Schell	Nominated
1974 (47th)	One or the Other of Us	Einer von uns beiden	Wolfgang Petersen	Not nominated
1975 (48th)	The Enigma of Kaspar Hauser	Jeder für sich und Gott gegen alle	Werner Herzog	Not nominated
1976 (49th)	The Clown	Ansichten eines Clowns	Vojtěch Jasný	Not nominated
1977 (50th)	The American Friend	Der amerikanische Freund	Wim Wenders	Not nominated
1978 (51st)	The Glass Cell	Die gläserne Zelle	Hans W. Geißendörfer	Nominated
1979 (52nd)	The Tin Drum	Die Blechtrommel	Volker Schlöndorff	Won Academy Award
1980 (53rd)	Fabian		Wolf Gremm	Not nominated
1981 (54th)	Lili Marleen		Rainer Werner Fassbinder	Not nominated
1982 (55th)	Fitzcarraldo		Werner Herzog	Not nominated
1983 (56th)	A Woman in Flames	Die flambierte Frau	Robert van Ackeren	Not nominated
1984 (57th)	Man Under Suspicion	Morgen in Alabama	Norbert Kückelmann	Not nominated
1985 (58th)	Angry Harvest	Bittere Ernte	Agnieszka Holland	Nominated
1986 (59th)	Men...	Männer…	Doris Dörrie	Not nominated
1987 (60th)	Wings of Desire	Der Himmel über Berlin	Wim Wenders	Not nominated
1988 (61st)	Yasemin		Hark Bohm	Not nominated
1989 (62nd)	Spider's Web	Das Spinnennetz	Bernhard Wicki	Not nominated
As Germany (since 1990)
1990 (63rd)	The Nasty Girl	Das schreckliche Mädchen	Michael Verhoeven	Nominated
1992 (65th)	Schtonk!		Helmut Dietl	Nominated
1993 (66th)	Justice	Justiz	Hans W. Geißendörfer	Not nominated
1994 (67th)	The Promise	Das Versprechen	Margarethe von Trotta	Not nominated
1995 (68th)	Brother of Sleep	Schlafes Bruder	Joseph Vilsmaier	Not nominated
1996 (69th)	Deathmaker	Der Totmacher	Romuald Karmakar	Not nominated
1997 (70th)	Beyond Silence	Jenseits der Stille	Caroline Link	Nominated
1998 (71st)	Run Lola Run	Lola rennt	Tom Tykwer	Not nominated
1999 (72nd)	Aimée & Jaguar	Aimée und Jaguar	Max Färberböck	Not nominated
2000 (73rd)	No Place to Go	Die Unberührbare	Oskar Roehler	Not nominated
2001 (74th)	The Experiment	Das Experiment	Oliver Hirschbiegel	Not nominated
2002 (75th)	Nowhere in Africa	Nirgendwo in Afrika	Caroline Link	Won Academy Award
2003 (76th)	Good Bye, Lenin!		Wolfgang Becker	Not nominated
2004 (77th)	Downfall	Der Untergang	Oliver Hirschbiegel	Nominated
2005 (78th)	Sophie Scholl – The Final Days	Sophie Scholl – Die letzten Tage	Marc Rothemund	Nominated
2006 (79th)	The Lives of Others	Das Leben der Anderen	Florian Henckel von Donnersmarck	Won Academy Award
2007 (80th)	The Edge of Heaven	Auf der anderen Seite	Fatih Akın	Not nominated
2008 (81st)	The Baader Meinhof Complex	Der Baader Meinhof Komplex	Uli Edel	Nominated
2009 (82nd)	The White Ribbon	Das weiße Band	Michael Haneke	Nominated
2010 (83rd)	When We Leave	Die Fremde	Feo Aladag	Not nominated
2011 (84th)	Pina	Pina – Tanzt, tanzt sonst sind wir verloren	Wim Wenders	Made shortlist
2012 (85th)	Barbara	Barbara	Christian Petzold	Not nominated
2013 (86th)	Two Lives	Zwei Leben	Georg Maas	Made shortlist
2014 (87th)	Beloved Sisters	Die geliebten Schwestern	Dominik Graf	Not nominated
2015 (88th)	Labyrinth of Lies	Im Labyrinth des Schweigens	Giulio Ricciarelli	Made shortlist
2016 (89th)	Toni Erdmann		Maren Ade	Nominated
2017 (90th)	In the Fade	Aus dem Nichts	Fatih Akin	Made shortlist
2018 (91st)	Never Look Away	Werk ohne Autor	Florian Henckel von Donnersmarck	Nominated
2019 (92nd)	System Crasher	Systemsprenger	Nora Fingscheidt	Not nominated
2020 (93rd)	And Tomorrow the Entire World	Und morgen die ganze Welt	Julia von Heinz	Not nominated
2021 (94th)	I'm Your Man	Ich bin dein Mensch	Maria Schrader	Made shortlist
2022 (95th)	All Quiet on the Western Front	Im Westen Nichts Neues	Edward Berger	Won Academy Award
2023 (96th)	The Teachers' Lounge	Das Lehrerzimmer	İlker Çatak	Nominated
2024 (97th)	The Seed of the Sacred Fig	دانه‌ی انجیر معابد	Mohammad Rasoulof	Nominated
2025 (98th)	Sound of Falling	In die Sonne schauen	Mascha Schilinski	Made shortlist
2026 (99th)	Everytime		Sandra Wollner	Pending

=== German Democratic Republic (1949–1990) ===
Best International Feature Film submissions from East Germany

Highlights
- Debut: 1973
- Submissions: 5
- Nominations: 1
- Oscar winners: none

Year^{[e]} (Ceremony)	Film title used in nomination	Original title	Director	Result
1973 (46th)	Her Third	Der Dritte	Egon Günther	Not nominated
1976 (49th)	Jacob the Liar	Jakob der Lügner	Frank Beyer	Nominated
1977 (50th)	Mama, I'm Alive	Mama, ich lebe	Konrad Wolf	Not nominated
1980 (53rd)	The Fiancee	Die Verlobte	Günter Reisch and Günther Rücker	Not nominated
1983 (56th)	The Turning Point	Der Aufenthalt	Frank Beyer	Not nominated

== Shortlisted Films ==
Every year since 2006, Germany has announced a list of finalists that varied in number over the years (from 4 to 17 films) before announcing its official Oscar nominee, except in the years 2008, 2009 and 2017 where an official list was not announced. The following films have been shortlisted by the Germany's selection committee:

2006	The Cloud · Requiem · Wild Chicks
2007	And Along Come Tourists · Four Minutes · House of the Sleeping Beauties · My Führer – The Really Truest Truth about Adolf Hitler · Strike · Winter Journey
2010	Boxhagener Platz · The Coming Days · Habermann · Henri 4 · Jew Suss: Rise and Fall· Mahler on the Couch · Same Same but Different · Saviors in the Night
2011	The Albanian · Almanya: Welcome to Germany · The Day I Was Not Born · The Poll Diaries · Promising the Moon · Stopped on Track · Three · Wunderkinder
2012	Combat Girls · Farewell to the Frogs · Guardians · Hannah Arendt · Hotel Lux · Remembrance · This Ain't California
2013	A Coffee in Berlin · Free Fall · The German Friend · The Girl with Nine Wigs · Knight Rusty · My Beautiful Country · Nothing Bad Can Happen · Shifting the Blame
2014	Age of Cannibals · Finsterworld · Hanna's Journey · Home from Home: Chronicle of a Vision · Inbetween Worlds · The Last Mentsch · Phoenix · The Police Officer's Wife · Run Boy Run · Stations of the Cross · Stereo · West · The White Horse Inn · Who Am I · Wir sind die Neuen · Wolf Children
2015	13 Minutes · Head Full of Honey · Jack · Sanctuary · Schmidt's Nine Lives · Victoria · We Are Young. We Are Strong
2016	At Eye Level · The Diary of Anne Frank · Fog in August · Look Who's Back · The People vs. Fritz Bauer · Power to Change: The Energy Revolution · Stefan Zweig: Farewell to Europe
2018	3 Days in Quiberon · Ballon · The Captain · In the Aisles · The Invisibles · Mack the Knife: Brecht's Threepenny Film · The Silent Revolution · Simpel · Tehran Taboo · Transit
2019	All About Me · The Collini Case · The German Lesson · Heimat Is a Space in Time · Lara · Sealed Lips
2020	Berlin Alexanderplatz · Crescendo · Curveball · Enfant Terrible · Fritzi: A Revolutionary Tale · I've Never Been to New York · Undine · Wet Dog · When Hitler Stole Pink Rabbit
2021	Copilot · Dear Thomas · Die Rettung der uns bekannten Welt · Fabian: Going to the Dogs · Femocracy · Je suis Karl · Mr. Bachmann and His Class · The Last Execution · The Royal Game
2022	The Forger · Lieber Kurt · Mostly Minimalistic · Nico · No One's with the Calves · Rabiye Kurnaz vs. George W. Bush · Talking About the Weather · We Might as Well Be Dead
2023	Afire · Anselm · Elaha · The Ordinaries · Orphea in Love · Sisi & I · The Universal Theory · Weekend Rebels · What You Can See from Here · A Whole Life · A Woman
2024	Dying · The Femocracy 2: Good Morning, You Beautiful! · From Hilde, with Love · The Glory of Life · Goebbels and the Führer · Hollywoodgate · In the Blind Spot · The Investigation · Sad Jokes · Silence · Stella. A Life. · Two to One
2025	Amrum · John Cranko · Riefenstahl · The Tiger
2026	23,000 Lives · Oh - This Unspeakable Void · Babystar · The Dreamed Adventure · Trial of Hein · Visitation · Minotaur · No Good Men · You Belive In Angels, Mr. Drowak? · Prosecution

== See also ==
- List of Academy Award winners and nominees for Best International Feature Film

== Notes ==
a: Several German films were nominated for or won Academy Awards in categories other than Best Foreign Language Film. Although it was never submitted by West Germany for competition in the Best Foreign Language Film category, the submarine film Das Boot by Wolfgang Petersen was nominated for six other Academy Awards, as it had been commercially released in Los Angeles County. Nine German films were nominated in the documentary categories, but only Serengeti Shall Not Die (1959) by Bernhard Grzimek managed to win the Academy Award for Documentary Feature. The eight other nominated documentaries were: Kahl (1961) by Haro Senft, Chariots of the Gods (1970) by Harald Reinl, The Silent Revolution (1972) by Edouard de Laurot, Battle of Berlin (1973) by Franz Baake, The Yellow Star – The Persecution of the Jews in Europe 1933–45 (1980) by Dieter Hildebrandt, Marlene (1984) by Maximilian Schell, Buena Vista Social Club (1999) by Wim Wenders and The Story of the Weeping Camel (2004) by Byambasuren Davaa and Luigi Falorni.
Five non-documentary German short films won Academy Awards as well. The Academy Award for Animated Short Film was won by Christoph Lauenstein and Wolfgang Lauenstein for Balance in 1989, and by Tyron Montgomery and Thomas Stellmach for Quest in 1996. Two other German films were nominated for but did not win the Academy Award for Animated Short Film: The Periwig-Maker (2000) by Steffen Schäffler and Das Rad (2002) by Chris Stenner, Arvid Uibel and Heidi Wittlinger. The Academy Award for Live Action Short Film was won by Pepe Danquart for Black Rider (Schwarzfahrer) in 1993, by Florian Gallenberger for Quiero ser (I want to be...) in 2000 and by Jochen Alexander Freydank for Spielzeugland (Toyland) in 2008. Gregor's Greatest Invention by Johannes Kiefer was nominated for the Academy Award for Live Action Short Film in 2001 but lost.
b: The committee which selects the German submission to the Academy is composed of the following nine associations:
- Verband der Filmproduzenten Archived 4 December 2008 at the Wayback Machine (Association of German Feature Film Producers);
- Verband Deutscher Filmexporteure Archived 21 June 2007 at the Wayback Machine (Association of German Film Exporters);
- AG Neuer Deutscher Spielfilmproduzenten (Association of New Feature Film Producers);
- Verband der Filmverleiher Archived 11 May 2020 at the Wayback Machine (Association of Film Distributors);
- Hauptverband Deutscher Filmtheater (Association of German Film Theaters);
- Bundesverband Kamera Archived 16 September 2008 at the Wayback Machine (Association of Cinematographers);
- German Film Critics Association (Verband der deutschen Filmkritik) (Association of German Film Critics);
- German Directors Guild (Bundesverband Regie);
- Filmförderungsanstalt Archived 13 September 2008 at the Wayback Machine (German Federal Film Board).
c: In 1991, the selection committee issued an official statement according to which no German film possessed the high quality to become a nominee. Although Agnieszka Holland's film Europa Europa was critically acclaimed (winning prizes from the New York and Boston film critics, the National Board of Review, as well as a Golden Globe) and was at the time the second highest-grossing German film ever in the United States (after Das Boot), it was not chosen. This was widely criticized and prompted several prominent German filmmakers to write an open letter denouncing the selection panel's refusal to submit Europa Europa. It was claimed that the committee did not choose the film due to its delicate subject matter (the story of a Jew who escaped persecution by the Nazis by masquerading as an Aryan). Members of the selection committee were reported to have unofficially said that the film was "junk" and "an embarrassment". It was also doubted whether the film would comply with Academy rules, as it was largely filmed in Poland and only partially produced with German financing. Although Europa Europa was not submitted, it was commercially released in Los Angeles County and thus qualified for Academy Awards in other categories. It was nominated for Best Adapted Screenplay but did not win.
d: In 2009 the selection committee chose The White Ribbon as the official German submission. This has caused some controversy as well as confusion about the rules of the Academy, which would have accepted a submission from either Germany or Austria. Martin Schweighofer, head of the Austrian Film Commission, has expressed that he isn't happy with the decision: "The discomfort arises because of the vague rules of the Academy. In essential regards the film is Austrian." It has been reported that the American distributor, Sony Pictures Classics, pressured Germany to submit it rather than Austria for tactical reasons, since Austrian films have been nominated two years in a row with 2007's The Counterfeiters and 2008's Revanche.
e^{1} ^{2} ^{3} : Each year is linked to an article about that particular year in film history.
f : West Germany and reunified Germany are listed separately by the Academy of Motion Picture Arts and Sciences. In the Academy’s official records, awards and nominations prior to reunification are explicitly credited to West Germany. Only from 1990 onward is Germany recognized as a unified nation. In Germany itself, however, all awards – both from the era of West Germany and after reunification – are viewed as part of a shared national film history. Regardless of the former political division, the Oscars and nominations are counted together and considered part of a single German achievement.

== General references ==
- "Best Features". German Films. Archived from the original on 30 November 2007.
- "Best International Feature Film". German Films.
