= German Film Award =

German national film award

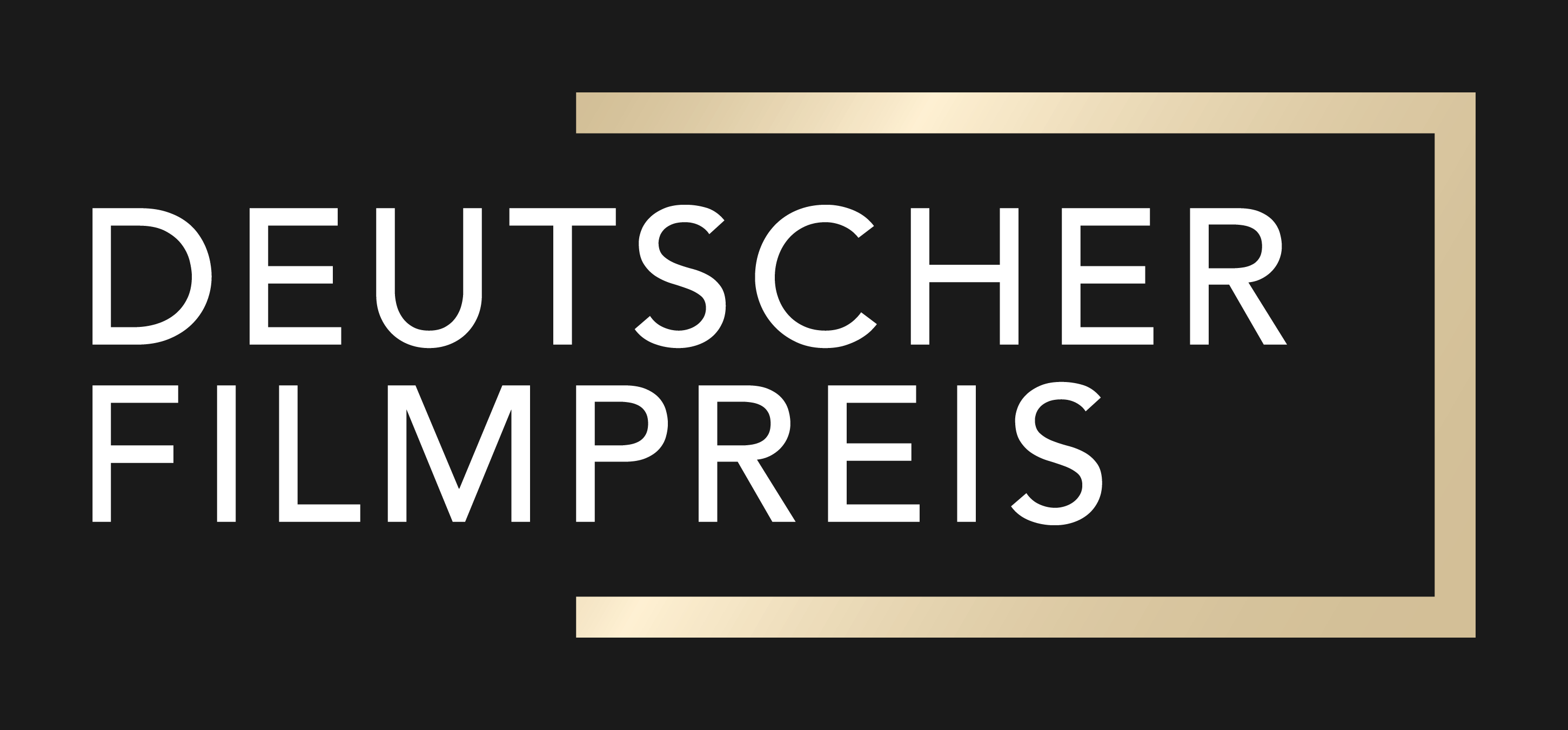
- Awarded for: Best in cinema
- Country: Germany
- Presented by: Deutsche Filmakademie
- First award: 1951
- Website: deutscher-filmpreis.de

The German Film Award (German: Deutscher Filmpreis), also known as Lola after its prize statuette, is the national film award of Germany. It is presented at an annual ceremony honouring cinematic achievements in the German film industry. Besides being the most important film award in Germany, it is also the most highly endowed German cultural award, with cash prizes in its current 20 categories totalling nearly three million euros.

From 1951 to 2004 it was awarded by a commission, but since 2005 the award has been organized by the German Film Academy (Deutsche Filmakademie). The Federal Commissioner for Cultural and Media Affairs has been responsible for the administration of the prize since 1999. The awards ceremony is traditionally held in Berlin.

== History ==
The award was created in 1951 by the Federal Ministry of the Interior and was first given out during the Berlin Film Festival. A practice that was kept for the upcoming decades. Since 1999 it is commissioned by the Federal Government Commissioner for Culture and the Media.

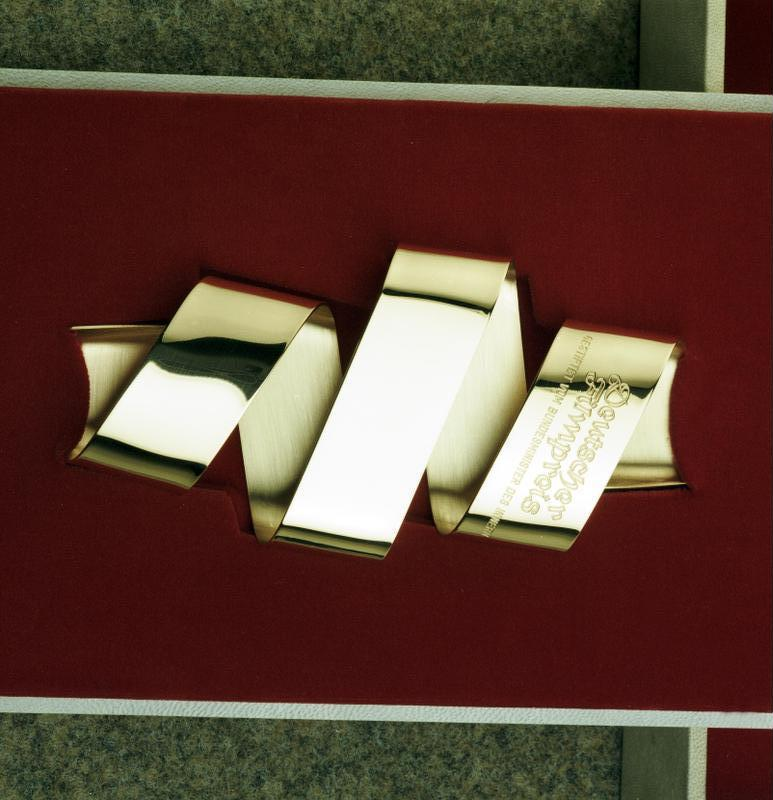
The trophy from 1951 until 1998

In the first years the awards had numerous trophies that were handed out for different categories. Aside from the main categories for Best Picture, Director and Screenplay most others from the inaugural edition have been short lived such as Film that promote democratic values due to the constant change of the awards constitution in the early years. As a rule stated that awards would only be awarded for outstanding achievements, not every category had a winner each year. Over time, the award in the shape of a film tape became the most common trophy, either in gold or silver. The Golden Bowl became the highest honour for Best Picture, however due to not being handed out for more than 17 years, the award was abolished in 1996.

Due to the confusing mechanism as well as changing categories, the award lost its relevance. With only a press conference and no televised broadcast, it did not attract the public's interest in West Germany. Since the reunification of Germany in 1990, constants efforts have been made to underline the award's significance as a national correlation to similar awards honours such as the Academy Awards or the Césars. In 1995 for the first time, winners were announced during a glamorous telecast in Friedrichstadt-Palast, one of the most prestigious venues of former East-Berlin. In the following years, other locations were chosen that were symbolic for the once divided city such as the Berlin Tempelhof Airport or the Brandenburg Gate.

Since 1999, the various category winners are awarded a statuette, the LOLA. The name refers to Marlene Dietrich's role in Der blaue Engel, Rainer Werner Fassbinder's film Lola and Tom Tykwer's very successful movie Lola rennt.

Mechthild Schmidt, Partner of HouseWorks digital media, New York about her 1999 design: "I wanted to symbolize motion. Film IS movement. I wanted the statue to express confidence without being stern, strength without being static. It was important to me to give the "Deutschen Filmpreis" its own identity, not trying to borrow what other awards already successfully symbolize. While the Oscar is the strong, firm standing fighter and winner, I wanted the Filmprize statue to symbolize the dynamics of movement, the muse, the inspiration necessary to make a work of art, to become a winner. The movement is carried through to the asymmetrical conical base. Stylistically, I was looking for a timeless modern design as well as a historical reference to the first golden era of German film, the Art Deco in the 1920s."

From 1999 to 2002 the show was televised by a private broadcaster ProSieben. Since 2003 it has rotated each year between the two major German public broadcasters ARD and ZDF.

Before the founding of the German Film Academy (Deutsche Filmakademie) in 2005 a single prize was awarded for the technical categories of cinematography, film editing, production design, art direction and musical score in the category "Outstanding Singular Achievement".

== Selection process ==
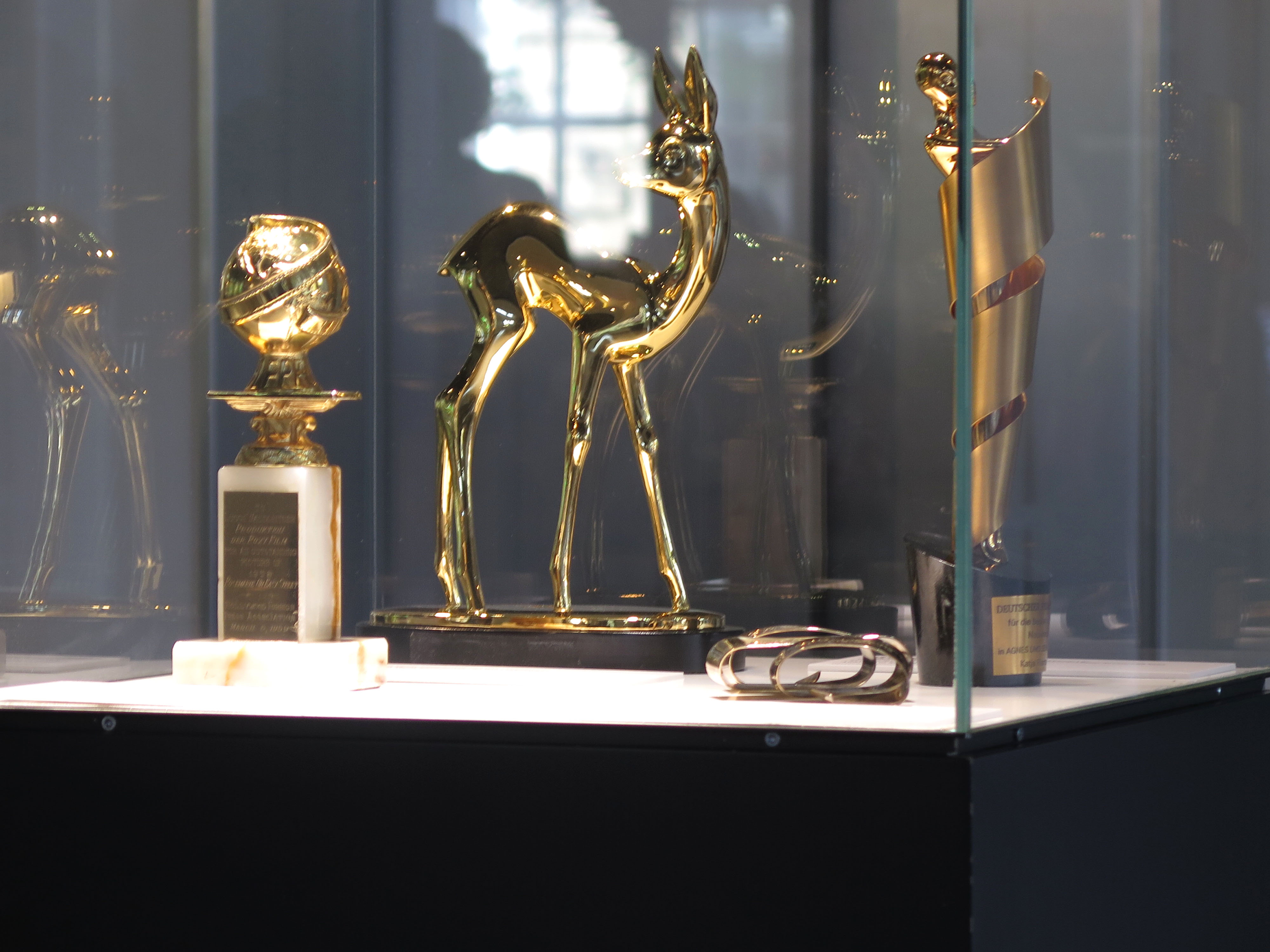
The Lola Award on the right as it is given out since 1999

Borrowing from the American model, the awards have been made by an academy, the Deutsche Filmakademie, since 2005. The academy replaces a much-criticised jury which was constituted according to the principle of political proportionality, and on which politicians and clergymen also sat. Now the jury consists of specialised members from the German Film Academy.

The selection process has three main steps:

1. Registration and pre-selection
2. Nomination
3. Election of the award winners

Nominations are decided by a pre-determined jury from each branch. Except for the film categories, usually three nominees are announced. More nominees are allowed in case of a tie. The nominations for the film categories are endowed with 100.000 Euro (Documentary), 125.000 Euro (Best Children's Film) and 250.000 Euro (Feature Film). Winners in each individual categories get 10.000 Euro, whereas the main winner in the Film category gets 500.000 Euro (including the nomination reward). The Best Film category features six nominees with the three most voted winning a bronze, silver and gold award respectively.

== Categories ==
=== Merit awards ===
- Best Fiction Film
- Best Documentary Film
- Best Children's Film
- Best Director
- Best Screenplay
- Best Actress
- Best Actor
- Best Supporting Actress
- Best Supporting Actor
- Best Cinematography
- Best Editing
- Best Costume Design
- Best Production Design
- Best Sound Editing
- Best Score
- Best Make-Up
- Best Visual Effects and Animation

=== Special awards ===
- Honorary Award for Outstanding Contributions to German Cinema
- Bernd Eichinger Memorial Award
- Audience Award for the highest grossing Film of the Year

=== Retired awards ===
- Best Foreign Film
- Audience Award for Best Picture and Actor/Actress

== Ceremonies ==
Edition	Date	Host(s)	Venue	Best Film
1st	6 June 1951	Alfred Bauer	Titania Palast	Two Times Lotte
2nd	23 April 1952		unknown	The Guilt of Doctor Homma
3rd	1953		Ufa Palast	Nights on the Road
4th	17 June 1954		Ufa Palast	No Way Back
5th	24 June 1955		Ufa Palast	Canaris: Master Spy
6th	22 June 1956		Ufa Palast	—N/a
7th	23 June 1957		Ufa Palast	The Captain from Köpenick
8th	29 June 1958		Ufa Palast	The Devil Strikes at Night
9th	28 June 1959		Ufa Palast	Arms and the Man
10th	22 June 1960		Ufa Palast	The Bridge
11th	25 June 1961		Kongresshalle Berlin	—N/a
12th	24 June 1962		Kongresshalle Berlin	The Bread of Those Early Years
13th	23 June 1963		Kongresshalle Berlin	The Endless Night and The Lightship
14th	28 June 1964		Kongresshalle Berlin	The River Line
15th	27 June 1965		Kongresshalle Berlin	The House in Karp Lane
16th	26 June 1966		Kongresshalle Berlin	Young Törless
17th	25 June 1967	Walther Schmieding	Kongresshalle Berlin	Yesterday Girl
18th	23 June 1968		Kongresshalle Berlin	Tattoo
19th	29 June 1969		Kongresshalle Berlin	Artists Under the Big Top: Perplexed
20th	28 June 1970	Hans Christoph Knebusch and Walther Schmieding	Kongresshalle Berlin	Katzelmacher and Malatesta
21st	27 June 1971		Kongresshalle Berlin	First Love and Lenz
22nd	24 June 1972		Kongresshalle Berlin	Trotta and Ludwig: Requiem for a Virgin King
23rd	24 June 1973		Kongresshalle Berlin	The Experts
24th	22 June 1974		Kongresshalle Berlin	The Pedestrian
25th	27 June 1975		Kongresshalle Berlin	Lina Braake
26th	25 June 1976		Kongresshalle Berlin	Calm Prevails Over the Country
27th	24 June 1977		Kongresshalle Berlin	Heinrich
28th	30 June 1978		unknown	The Glass Cell
29th	8 June 1979		unknown	The Tin Drum
30th	13 June 1980		unknown	The Last Years of Childhood
31st	26 June 1981		unknown	A Lot of Bills to Pay
32nd	26 June 1982		unknown	Marianne and Juliane
33rd	25 June 1983		unknown	The State of Things
34th	23 June 1984		unknown	Where the Green Ants Dream
35th	15 June 1985		unknown	Colonel Redl
36th	7 June 1986		Theater des Westens	Rosa Luxemburg
37th	13 June 1987		Theater des Westens	—N/a
38th	10 June 1988		Theater des Westens	Wings of Desire
39th	2 June 1989		Theater des Westens	Yasemin
40th	7 June 1990		Theater des Westens	Last Exit to Brooklyn
41st	6 June 1991	Leo Koschnik	Theater des Westens	Malina
42nd	4 June 1992		Theater des Westens	Schtonk!
43rd	3 June 1993	Ilja Richter	Theater des Westens	—N/a
44th	9 June 1994	Ilja Richter	Theater des Westens	Kaspar Hauser
45th	9 June 1995	Iris Berben	Friedrichstadt-Palast	Maybe... Maybe Not
46th	31 May 1996	Joachim Król and Veronica Ferres	Deutsche Oper Berlin	Deathmaker
47th	6 June 1997	Sabine Christiansen	Berlin Tempelhof Airport	Rossini
48th	6 June 1998	Joachim Fuchsberger	Brandenburg Gate	The Harmonists
49th	17 June 1999	Piet Klocke and Katarina Witt	Deutsche Oper Berlin	Run Lola Run
50th	16 June 2000	Götz Alsmann and Susann Atwell	Deutsche Oper Berlin	No Place to Go
51st	22 June 2001	Götz Alsmann and Susann Atwell	Deutsche Oper Berlin	The State I Am In
52nd	14 June 2002	Caroline Beil and Dirk Bach	Tempodrom	Nowhere in Africa
53rd	6 June 2003	Jörg Pilawa	Tempodrom	Good Bye, Lenin!
54th	18 June 2004	Jessica Schwarz and Ulrich Wickert	Tempodrom	Head-On
55th	5 June 2005	Michael "Bully" Herbig	Berliner Philharmonie	Go for Zucker!
56th	12 May 2006	Michael "Bully" Herbig	Palais am Funkturm	The Lives of Others
57th	4 May 2007	Michael "Bully" Herbig	Palais am Funkturm	Four Minutes
58th	25 April 2008	Barbara Schöneberger	Palais am Funkturm	The Edge of Heaven
59th	24 April 2009	Barbara Schöneberger	Palais am Funkturm	John Rabe
60th	23 April 2010	Barbara Schöneberger	Friedrichstadt-Palast	The White Ribbon
61st	8 April 2011	Barbara Schöneberger	Friedrichstadt-Palast	Vincent Wants to Sea
62nd	27 April 2012	Elyas M'Barek and Jessica Schwarz	Friedrichstadt-Palast	Stopped on Track
63rd	26 April 2013	Mirjam Weichselbraun	Tempodrom	A Coffee in Berlin
64th	9 May 2014	Jan Josef Liefers	Palais am Funkturm	Home from Home
65th	19 June 2015	Jan Josef Liefers	Palais am Funkturm	Victoria
66th	27 May 2016	Jan Josef Liefers	Palais am Funkturm	The People vs. Fritz Bauer
67th	28 April 2017	Jasmin Tabatabai	Palais am Funkturm	Toni Erdmann
68th	27 April 2018	Edin Hasanović and Iris Berben	Palais am Funkturm	3 Days in Quiberon
69th	3 May 2019	Désirée Nosbusch and Teddy Teclebrhan	Palais am Funkturm	Gundermann
70th	24 April 2020	Edin Hasanović	Palais am Funkturm	System Crasher
71th	1 October 2021	Daniel Donskoy	Palais am Funkturm	I'm Your Man
72nd	24 June 2022	Katrin Bauerfeind	Palais am Funkturm	Dear Thomas
73rd	12 May 2023	Jasmin Shakeri	Theater am Potsdamer Platz	The Teachers' Lounge
74th	3 May 2024		Theater am Potsdamer Platz	Dying
75th	9 May 2025	Christian Friedel	Theater am Potsdamer Platz	September 5

== Trivia ==
=== Films that received six or more German Film Awards ===
Film	Year	Noms.	Wins
All Quiet on the Western Front	2023	12	8
The White Ribbon	2010	13	10
The Devil Strikes at Night	1958	—N/a	10
Good Bye Lenin!	2003 (Note: the award for best unproduced screenplay was given out in 2002)	10	9 (Note: including one Audience Award and an award for unproduced screenplay)
System Crasher	2020	10	8
The Dark Valley	2015	9	8
The Lives of Others	2006	11	7
3 Days in Quiberon	2018	10	7
Run Lola Run	1999	6	7 (Note: including an audience award)
Go for Zucker!	2005	10	6
Gundermann	2019	10	6
The People vs. Fritz Bauer	2016	9	6
A Coffee in Berlin	2013	8	6
Perfume: The Story of a Murderer	2007	8	6
Victoria	2015	7	6
Anonymous	2012	7	6
Toni Erdmann	2017	6	6
The Wrong Move	1975	—N/a	6
The Bread of Those Early Years	1962	—N/a	6
The Captain from Köpenick	1957	—N/a	6

=== "Big Five" winners and nominees ===
==== Winners ====
- Toni Erdmann (2016)
1. Best Film: Toni Erdmann
2. Best Director: Maren Ade
3. Best Actor: Peter Simonischek
4. Best Actress: Sandra Hüller
5. Best Writing: Maren Ade
- System Crasher (2020)
1. Best Film: System Crasher
2. Best Director: Nora Fingscheidt
3. Best Actor: Albrecht Schuch
4. Best Actress: Helena Zengel
5. Best Writing: Nora Fingscheidt

==== Nominees (Note: only after the inclusion of nominations in screenplay in 2005 are considered) ====
Four awards won

- Good Bye Lenin (2002) (Note: the screenplay award was won year before): Best Actress (Katrin Saß)
- Go for Zucker! (2004): Best Actress (Hannelore Elsner)
- The White Ribbon (2009): Best Actress (Susanne Lothar)

Three awards won

- Stopped on Track (2011): Best Actress (Steffi Kühnert) and Writing (Andreas Dresen and Cooky Ziesche)

=== Actors with two or more competitive awards ===
Actor	Awards won	Leading	Supporting	Others
Götz George	4	3	0	1 (Note: Best Young Actor 1960)
Albrecht Schuch	4	2	2	
Irm Hermann	3	1	1	1 (Note: Best Ensemble 1970)
Sandra Hüller	3	2	1	
Eva Mattes	3	0	2	1 (Note: Best Young Actress 1971)
Katja Riemann	3	2	1	
Hanna Schygulla	3	2	0	1 (Note: Best Ensemble 1970)
Barbara Sukowa	3	3	0	
Mario Adorf	2	1	0	1 (Note: Best Young Actor 1958)
Moritz Bleibtreu	2	1	1	
Klaus Maria Brandauer	2	2	0	
Daniel Brühl	2	2	0	
Edith Clever	2	2	0	
Justus von Dohnányi	2	0	2	
Hannelore Elsner	2	2	0	
O.W. Fischer	2	2	0	
Martina Gedeck	2	1	1	
Walter Giller	2	1	1	
Michael Gwisdek	2	1	1	
Fritzi Haberlandt	2	0	2	
Sibel Kekilli	2	2	0	
Peter Kern	2	1	0	1 (Note: Best Ensemble 1975)
Nastassja Kinski	2	1	0	1 (Note: Best Ensemble 1975)
Burghart Klaußner	2	1	1	
Joachim Król	2	2	0	
Frederick Lau	2	1	1	
Hanns Lothar	2	0	2	
Hannes Messemer	2	1	1	
Uwe Ochsenknecht	2	2	0	
Gerhard Olschewski	2	2	0	
Lena Stolze	2	2	0	
Lilli Palmer	2	2	0	
Sophie Rois	2	1	1	
Heinz Rühmann	2	2	0	
Christine Schorn	2	0	2	
Maria Schrader	2	2	0	
Sigfrit Steiner	2	1	1	
Laura Tonke	2	1	1	
Ulrich Tukur	2	1	1	

== See also ==
- Bayerischer Filmpreis
- Berlin International Film Festival
- Cinema of Germany
