= German Film Award for Best Actress in a Leading Role =

The German Film Award for Best Actress in a Leading Role (German: Deutscher Filmpreis Beste weibliche Hauptrolle) honours the best performance by an actress in a leading role in a German produced film.

== Winners ==
Year	Winner	Filmtitle
1954	Ruth Leuwerik	Geliebtes Leben
1955	Therese Giehse	Kinder, Mütter und ein General
1956	Lilli Palmer	Teufel in Seide
1957	Lilli Palmer	Anastasia, die letzte Zarentochter
1958	Liselotte Pulver	Das Wirtshaus im Spessart
1959	No Prize Awarded	
1960	Nadja Tiller	Labyrinth
1961	Hilde Krahl	Das Glas Wasser
1962	Vera Tschechowa	Das Brot der frühen Jahre
1963	Elisabeth Bergner	Die glücklichen Jahre der Thorwalds
1964	Mira Stupica	Herrenpartie
1965	Jana Brejchová	Das Haus in der Karpfengasse
1966	Sabine Sinjen	Es
1967	Alexandra Kluge	Abschied von gestern
1968	Thekla Carola Wied	Spur eines Mädchens
2013	Barbara Sukowa	Hannah Arendt
2014	Jördis Triebel	West
2015	Laia Costa	Victoria
2016	Laura Tonke	Hedi Schneider Is Stuck
2017	Sandra Hüller	Toni Erdmann
2018	Marie Bäumer	3 Days in Quiberon
2019	Susanne Wolff	Styx
2020	Helena Zengel	System Crasher
2021	Maren Eggert	I'm Your Man
2022	Meltem Kaptan	Rabiye Kurnaz vs. George W. Bush
2023	Leonie Benesch	The Teachers' Lounge
2024	Corinna Harfouch	Dying
2025	Liv Lisa Fries	From Hilde, with Love

== See also ==
- César Award for Best Actress
- Goya Award for Best Actress

== Weblinks ==
- Official List of all winners since 2005
- All winners
