= European University Film Award =

European film award

European Film Award University Award
- Awarded for: University Award
- Country: Europe
- Presented by: European Film Academy, Filmfest Hamburg
- First award: 2016
- Currently held by: Flee (2021)
- Website: europeanfilmawards.eu eufa.org

The European University Film Award is one of the awards presented by the European Film Academy, it was first awarded at the 29th European Film Awards in 2016 and is presented and voted by European university students.

== Background ==
The award was inspired by a model in Québec, the Prix collégial du cinéma québécois (PCCQ) and was launched by Filmfest Hamburg and the European Film Academy (EFA) in 2016 as the European University Film Award (EUFA). The creation of this initiative was to "involve a younger audience, to spread the "European idea" and to transport the spirit of European cinema to an audience of university students. It shall also support film dissemination, film education and the culture of debating".

For the first edition of the award 13 universities from 13 different European countries participated, the number has increased throughout the years with 20 participants in 2017, 22 in 2018 and 24 in 2019. For the 33rd European Film Awards, the participants were from 25 universities from 25 countries: Austria, Belgium, Czech Republic, Finland, France, Germany, Greece, Hungary, Iceland, Ireland, Israel, Italy, Kosovo, Latvia, Lithuania, Netherlands, Poland, Portugal, Romania, Russia, Serbia, Spain, Sweden, Switzerland, Turkey and United Kingdom. The 2023 edition included participants from 24 universities, and the 2024 edition saw that number drop to 23 in the absence of Israel's Tel Aviv University.

=== Universities ===
The following universities participated in the 5th EUFA edition:

- Kosovo – AAB College in Pristina
- Denmark – Aarhus University in Aarhus
- Czech Republic – Charles University in Prague
- Germany – Film University Babelsberg KONRAD WOLF in Potsdam
- Turkey – Kadir Has University in Istanbul
- Latvia – Latvian Academy of Culture in Riga
- Sweden – Linnaeus University in Växjö
- United Kingdom – Liverpool John Moores University in Liverpool
- Hungary – Pázmány Péter Catholic University in Budapest
- Romania – Sapientia – Hungarian University of Transylvania in Cluj-Napoca
- Israel – Tel Aviv University in Tel Aviv
- Ireland – University College Cork in Cork
- Belgium – University of Antwerp in Antwerp
- Serbia – University of Arts Belgrade in Belgrade
- Greece – University of the Aegean in Lesbos
- Spain – University of the Basque Country in Bilbao
- Portugal – University of Beira Interior in Covilhã
- Iceland – University of Iceland in Reykjavík
- Switzerland – University of Lausanne in Lausanne
- Poland – University of Łódź in Łódź
- Finland – University of Oulu in Oulu
- France – University of Paris III: Sorbonne Nouvelle in Paris
- Italy – University of Udine in Udine
- Netherlands – Utrecht University in Utrecht
- Lithuania – Vilnius University in Vilnius

== Winners and nominees ==
=== 2010s ===
Year	English title	Original title	Director(s)	Country of production
2016 (29th)
2016 (29th)	I, Daniel Blake		Ken Loach	United Kingdom, France
2016 (29th)	Graduation	Bacalaureat	Cristian Mungiu	Romania, France, Belgium
2016 (29th)	The Happiest Day in the Life of Olli Mäki	Hymyilevä mies	Juho Kuosmanen	Finland, Germany, Sweden
2016 (29th)	Fire at Sea	Fuocoammare	Gianfranco Rosi	Italy, France
2016 (29th)	Toni Erdmann		Maren Ade	Germany, Austria
2017 (30th)
2017 (30th)	Heartstone	Hjartasteinn	Guðmundur Arnar Guðmundsson	Iceland, Denmark
2017 (30th)	Home		Fien Troch	Belgium
2017 (30th)	Loveless	Нелюбовь / Nelyubov	Andrey Zvyagintsev	Russia, Belgium, Germany, France
2017 (30th)	The Other Side of Hope	Toivon tuolla puolen	Aki Kaurismäki	Finland, Germany
2017 (30th)	The War Show		Andreas Dalsgaard, Obaidah Zytoon	Denmark, Syria, Finland
2018 (31st)
2018 (31st)	Happy as Lazzaro	Lazzaro felice	Alice Rohrwacher	Italy, Germany, France, Switzerland
2018 (31st)	Foxtrot	פוֹקְסטְרוֹט	Samuel Maoz	Israel, Germany, France, Switzerland
2018 (31st)	Styx		Wolfgang Fischer	Germany, Austria
2018 (31st)	Tarzan's Testicles	Ouăle lui Tarzan	Alexandru Solomon	Romania, France
2018 (31st)	Utøya: July 22	Utøya 22. juli	Erik Poppe	Norway
2019 (32nd)
2019 (32nd)	Portrait of a Lady on Fire	Portrait de la jeune fille en feu	Céline Sciamma	France
2019 (32nd)	And Then We Danced	და ჩვენ ვიცეკვეთ / Da chven vitsek'vet	Levan Akin	Sweden, Georgia
2019 (32nd)	God Exists, Her Name Is Petrunija	Господ постои, името ѝ е Петрунија / Gospod postoi, imeto ì e Petrunija	Teona Stugar Mitevska	North Macedonia, Belgium, Slovenia, France, Croatia
2019 (32nd)	Piranhas	La paranza dei bambini	Claudio Giovannesi	Italy
2019 (32nd)	System Crasher	Systemsprenger	Nora Fingscheidt	Germany

=== 2020s ===
Year	English title	Original title	Director(s)	Country of production
2020 (33rd)
2020 (33rd)	Saudi Runaway		Susanne Regina Meures	Switzerland
2020 (33rd)	Another Round	Druk	Thomas Vinterberg	Denmark
2020 (33rd)	Berlin Alexanderplatz		Burhan Qurbani	Germany
2020 (33rd)	Corpus Christi	Boże Ciało	Jan Komasa	Poland
2020 (33rd)	Slalom		Charlène Favier	France
2021 (34th)
2021 (34th)	Flee	Flugt	Jonas Poher Rasmussen	Denmark, France, Sweden, Norway
2021 (34th)	Apples	Mila / Μήλα	Christos Nikou	Greece, Poland, Slovenia
2021 (34th)	Great Freedom	Große Freiheit	Sebastian Meise	Austria, Germany
2021 (34th)	Happening	L'événement	Audrey Diwan	France
2021 (34th)	Quo Vadis, Aida?		Jasmila Žbanić	Bosnia and Herzegovina, Austria, the Netherlands, France, Poland, Norway, Germany, Romania, Turkey
2022 (35th)
2022 (35th)	Alcarràs		Carla Simón	Spain, Italy
2022 (35th)	Close		Lukas Dhont	Belgium, France, Netherlands
2022 (35th)	The Eclipse	Formørkelsen	Nataša Urban	Norway
2022 (35th)	Eo		Jerzy Skolimowski	Poland, (Italy)
2022 (35th)	Triangle of Sadness		Ruben Östlund	Sweden, Germany, France, United Kingdom
