= Albrecht Schuch =

German actor (born 1985)

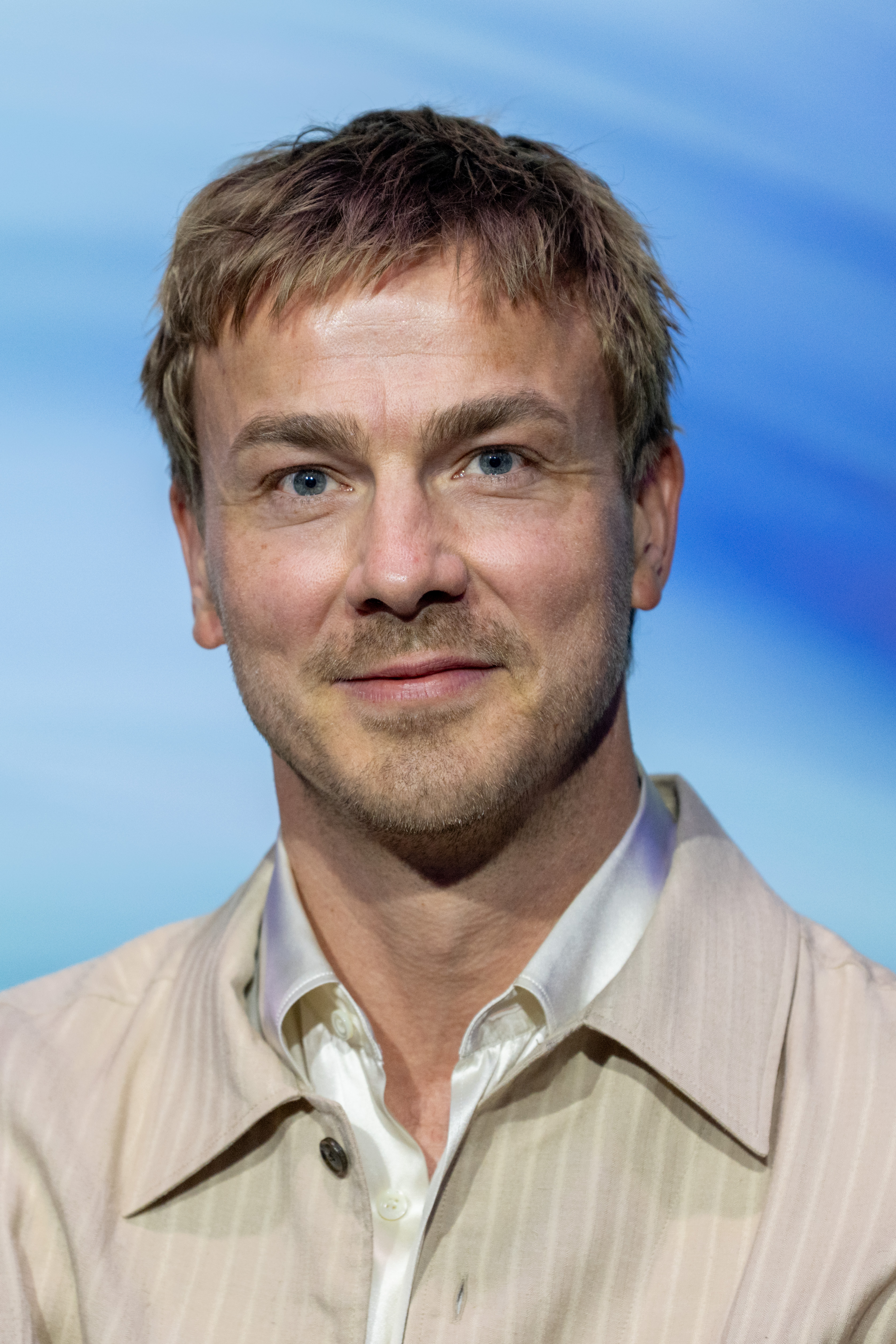
- Schuch in 2025
- Born: Albrecht Abraham Schuch; 21 August 1985 (age 40); Jena, East Germany
- Education: University of Music and Theatre Leipzig
- Occupation: Actor
- Years active: 2001–present
- Notable work: All Quiet on the Western Front; System Crasher
- Relatives: Karoline Schuch (sister)

Albrecht Abraham Schuch (born 21 August 1985) is a German actor. He is the recipient of several accolades, including four German Film Awards, a Bavarian Film Award, and a German Television Award. He was nominated for a BAFTA Award for Best Actor in a Supporting Role for his performance in All Quiet on the Western Front (2022).

== Early life ==
Schuch was born in 1985 in Jena, East Germany. He is the younger brother of actress Karoline Schuch. He studied acting at the University of Music and Theatre Leipzig from 2006 to 2010.

== Career ==
Schuch made his film debut in Robert Thalheim's Westwind. In 2012, he played his first film starring role as Alexander von Humboldt in Detlev Buck's Measuring the World based on Daniel Kehlmann's novel of the same name.

He is the only male actor to win the German Film Award in two categories as lead and supporting actor at the same award ceremony. In 2020, he won both awards for the films System Crasher and Berlin Alexanderplatz. Two years later, he won again as Best Actor for the Film Dear Thomas. In 2023 he won the German Film Award as Best Supporting Actor for his performance in All Quiet on the Western Front.

== Filmography ==
Film
Year	Title	Role	Notes
2011	Westwind	Ronny	
2012	Measuring the World	Alexander von Humboldt	Credited as Albrecht Abraham Schuch
2016	Paula	Otto Modersohn	
2018	Atlas	Jan Haller	
2019	System Crasher	Michael Heller	German Film Award for Best Actor
2020	Berlin Alexanderplatz	Reinhold	German Film Award for Best Supporting Actor
2021	Fabian: Going to the Dogs	Stephan Labude	
2021	Dear Thomas	Thomas Brasch	German Film Award for Best Actor; Bavarian Film Award for Best Actor
	Schachnovelle	Philip Stölzl	
2022	All Quiet on the Western Front	Stanislaus Katczinsky	Nominated for BAFTA for Best Supporting Actor German Film Award for Best Supporting Actor
2022	Dark Satellites		
2024	Peacock	Matthias	Austrian Film Award for Best Actor

TV
Year	Title	Role	Notes
2009	Bei uns und um die Ecke		TV movie
2010	Polizeiruf 110	Jacob	Episode: Schatten
2010	The Old Fox	Adrian Humbold	Episode: Ende der Schonzeit
2010	Neue Vahr Süd	Harry	
2012	NeoParadise	Himself	Episodes: Money Boy schlägt Klaas nieder/Der Pickup Artist/The Voice
2013	Tatort	Pater Rufus	Episode: Allmächtig
2014	Die Fahnderin	Florian Hofmann	TV movie
2016	NSU German History X	Uwe Mundlos	TV mini-series
2018	54 Hours	Peter Meyer	TV film German Screen Actors Award for Best Supporting Actor
2018	Bad Banks	Adam Pohl	TV series (2 seasons); German Television Award for Best Supporting Actor
