= Bei uns und um die Ecke =

- Country of origin: Germany
- Original language: German

Bei uns und um die Ecke (With Us and Around the Corner) is a German children's television series, broadcast in 6 episodes between 2008 and 2009.

== See also ==
- List of German television series
