= I'm Your Man (2021 film) =

2021 drama film by Maria Schrader

- Theatrical release poster
- German: Ich bin dein Mensch
- Directed by: Maria Schrader
- Written by: Emma Braslavsky
- Screenplay by: Jan Schomburg; Maria Schrader
- Produced by: Lisa Blumenberg
- Starring: Maren Eggert; Dan Stevens; Sandra Hüller; Hans Löw; Wolfgang Hübsch; Annika Meier; Falilou Seck; Jürgen Tarrach; Henriette Richter-Röhl; Monika Oschek
- Cinematography: Benedict Neuenfels
- Edited by: Hansjörg Weißbrich
- Music by: Tobias Wagner
- Production companies: Letterbox Filmproduktion; SWR
- Distributed by: Majestic Filmverleih
- Release dates: March 1, 2021 (Berlinale); July 1, 2021 (Germany)
- Running time: 105 minutes
- Country: Germany
- Language: German
- Box office: $501,700

I'm Your Man (German: Ich bin dein Mensch, lit. 'I'm Your Human') is a 2021 German science fiction romance film inspired by a story of the same name by Emma Braslavsky and directed by Maria Schrader and starring Maren Eggert, Dan Stevens and Sandra Hüller. It premiered at the 71st Berlin International Film Festival in March 2021. It was selected as the German entry for the Best International Feature Film at the 94th Academy Awards and made the shortlist in December 2021.

== Plot ==
Alma arrives at a dance club where an employee introduces her to Tom. Alma quizzes Tom on a complex math problem and trivial details about his favorite poem, and he readily answers. Tom then invites Alma to dance but suddenly begins repeating himself; he is quickly carried away, revealing him to be a robot.

The employee apologizes, noting that Alma is one of only ten experts asked to evaluate their robots, reassuring her that they will fix the glitch and she can proceed with the three-week project the next day.

Alma then visits Roger, her department head at the Pergamon Museum, ridiculing the many tests she went through to be presented with her "ideal man", mocking Tom and saying she's ready to write her evaluation. Roger reminds Alma that she agreed to the 3-week assessment and that he needs her expert input, as he is on an ethics committee that will decide if the robots will be given some human rights. Roger tells Alma that if she goes through with the experiment, he will allocate funds for her and her team to visit Chicago to see certain cuneiform tablets in person.

Afterward, fellow museum worker Julian invites Alma to his housewarming party, to meet his new girlfriend Steffi.

Alma visits her father, an elderly man showing signs of memory loss. She later takes Tom home and, over the next few days, resists his romantic gestures. Julian arrives at the apartment one morning to collect a picture, indicating that he and Alma were once in a relationship.

Alma then brings Tom with her to the museum. Tom is introduced to her team's work and suddenly alerts Alma of another researcher who has already written a paper about the subject they're researching. Alma reacts angrily and later gets drunk. At her apartment, Alma confronts Tom about whether or not he can feel anger, and questions how he is programmed to respond sexually. Rather than getting sexual, Tom puts Alma in her bed and leaves her there, saying she needs sleep.

The next day, the employee arrives for an evaluation. Alma says Tom's programming is "good" but gets irritated when the employee challenges her for treating Tom like a machine. Alma then realizes that the employee is also a robot and orders her out of her apartment. She apologizes to Tom for her behavior the night before.

Alma takes Tom to visit her father. She and her sister, Cora, review old photos and remember a childhood friend named Tom whom they met in Denmark, and with whom they were both in love. Tom and Alma then go to Julian's housewarming party. Steffi faints and Tom prevents her from hitting the ground. Alma talks to Julian privately, asking if Steffi is pregnant, which he confirms.

Back at her apartment, Alma reveals that she had previously suffered a miscarriage. Tom realizes Alma's fears of growing old alone like her father and Alma leaves the apartment, upset. She spies Tom coming out of the building, calling her name and looking for her. Alma follows him to the museum where they both sneak in, and they have sex in the shadows.

The next morning, Alma says she cannot continue interacting with a machine and that she is going to stop the experiment early. When Tom asks what will become of him, Alma says she cannot send him away and that she needs him to do it for her. Tom then leaves.

Alma records her evaluation for Roger, stating that having your every need fulfilled is not healthy for humans. She is then again visited by the employee for another evaluation and learns that Tom did not go back to the factory as she assumed, and has gone missing. Alma takes the ferry to Denmark and finds Tom sitting in the spot where she had met her childhood friend, having waited three days for her. Alma tells the story of how she used to sit in that same spot with her eyes closed, imagining her childhood friend Tom next to her, but whenever she opened her eyes he was never there. She closes her eyes.

== Cast ==
- Maren Eggert as Alma Felser
- Dan Stevens as Tom
- Sandra Hüller as Employee
- Hans Löw as Julian
- Wolfgang Hübsch as Father Felser
- Annika Meier as Cora
- Falilou Seck as Dekan Roger
- Jürgen Tarrach as Dr. Stuber
- Karolin Oesterling as Chloé
- Henriette Richter-Röhl as Steffi
- Monika Oschek as Woman in Coffee Shop

== Release ==
On February 11, 2021, Berlinale announced that the film would premiere at the 71st Berlin International Film Festival, in the Berlinale Competition section, in March 2021. Shortly after, Bleecker Street acquired U.S. distribution rights. It was released in the U.S. on September 17, 2021.

== Reception ==
=== Critical response ===
Review aggregator Rotten Tomatoes gives the film a 96% approval rating based on 122 reviews, with an average rating of 7.60/10. The site's critical consensus reads: "With a thought-provoking concept brought to humorous life by a pair of well-matched leads, I'm Your Man is an AI rom-com whose intelligence is anything but artificial." On Metacritic, the film has a score of 78 out of 100, based on 26 critics, indicating "Generally favorable reviews".

=== Accolades ===
Year	Award	Category	Nominee(s)	Result
2022	Alliance of Women Film Journalists	Best Non-English-language Film		Nominated
2022	Alliance of Women Film Journalists	Best Woman Screenwriter	Maria Schrader	Nominated
2021	Berlin International Film Festival	Best Leading Performance	Maren Eggert	Won
2021	Berlin International Film Festival	Competition Audience Award	Maria Schrader	Nominated
2021	Berlin International Film Festival	Golden Bear	Maria Schrader	Nominated
2021	Festival of German Film	Best Script	Jan Schomburg and Maria Schrader	Won
2021	Festival of German Film	Best Acting Performance	Dan Stevens	Won
2021	German Film Award	Best Actress	Maren Eggert	Won
2021	German Film Award	Best Director	Maria Schrader	Won
2021	German Film Award	Best Fiction Film	Lisa Blumenberg	Won
2021	German Film Award	Best Screenplay	Jan Schomburg and Maria Schrader	Won
2021	German Film Award	Best Actor	Dan Stevens	Nominated
2022	Goya Awards	Best European Film		Nominated
2021	Guenter Rohrbach Filmpreis	Best Cinematography	Benedict Neuenfels	Won
2021	Miskolc International Film Festival	CICAE Jury Prize	Maria Schrader	Won
2021	Miskolc International Film Festival	Best Feature Film	Maria Schrader	Nominated
2021	Online Association of Female Film Critics	Rosie Award		Nominated
2022	Palm Springs International Film Festival	Best Foreign Language Film		Nominated
2022	San Diego Film Critics Society Awards	Best Foreign Language Film		Runner-up
2022	Saturn Awards	Best International Film		Nominated
2021	Valladolid International Film Festival	Golden Spike	Maria Schrader	Nominated
2021	Women Film Critics Circle	Best Foreign Film By or About Women		Nominated

== See also ==
- List of submissions to the 94th Academy Awards for Best International Feature Film
- List of German submissions for the Academy Award for Best International Feature Film
- Satisfaction Guaranteed (short story)
- Making Mr. Right
