= The Teachers' Lounge =

2023 film by İlker Çatak

- Theatrical release poster
- German: Das Lehrerzimmer
- Directed by: İlker Çatak
- Written by: Johannes Duncker; İlker Çatak
- Produced by: Ingo Fliess
- Starring: Leonie Benesch; Leonard Stettnisch; Eva Löbau; Michael Klammer; Rafael Stachowiak; Sarah Bauerett; Kathrin Wehlisch; Anne-Kathrin Gummich
- Cinematography: Judith Kaufmann
- Edited by: Gesa Jäger
- Music by: Marvin Miller
- Production companies: if... Productions; ZDF; Arte
- Distributed by: Alamode Film
- Release dates: 18 February 2023 (Berlin); 4 May 2023 (Germany)
- Running time: 99 minutes
- Country: Germany
- Languages: German; Turkish; Polish; English
- Box office: $5.4 million

The Teachers' Lounge (German: Das Lehrerzimmer) is a 2023 German drama film directed by İlker Çatak, who co-wrote the screenplay with Johannes Duncker. Leonie Benesch stars as a teacher tasked with finding out which of her students is responsible for a series of thefts.

It was nominated to compete for the Panorama Audience Award at the 73rd Berlin International Film Festival, where it had its world premiere on 18 February 2023. Released to critical acclaim, the National Board of Review named The Teachers' Lounge one of the top five international films of 2023. It was nominated for Best International Feature Film at the 96th Academy Awards.

== Plot ==
Students from the 7th-grade class of the idealistic teacher Carla Nowak, a new transfer to the school, are pressured by other teachers to identify which of their classmates could be the most likely suspect for a series of thefts from the teachers' lounge. Carla encourages them to stay silent if they wish, but the other teachers pursue the issue and later force the male students in Carla's class to turn in their wallets for inspection. Upon discovering that a student of Turkish heritage, Ali, is carrying a lot of money, the teachers accuse him of theft; however, at a meeting with Ali's parents, the parents inform the teachers that the money was Ali's allowance, and they accuse the teachers of racially profiling Ali. Later, after witnessing a colleague steal money from the lounge's piggy bank, Carla decides to investigate the theft herself. Using her laptop, she secretly records her jacket and gets footage of an unknown person in a distinctive blouse taking money from her wallet.

Carla searches around the school and discovers an administrative colleague, Friederike Kuhn, is wearing the same blouse as on the video. Kuhn is also the single mother of Oskar, a bright but quiet student in Carla's class whom Carla admires. Carla privately attempts to get Kuhn to confess and return the money, but Kuhn is flustered and outraged at Carla's accusation and throws her out. Carla escalates to the principal, who is also unable to get Kuhn to admit to the theft. Kuhn becomes deeply upset during the interrogation and storms out after being put on leave, while Carla is discomfited by the principal's suggestion to get the police involved, preferring to keep the matter private. However, she is shocked when the principal notes that Carla will also have to be put under investigation, as her secret recording of the teachers' lounge violated the privacy of her colleagues.

At a parent–teacher meeting, the parents are displeased to hear of the teachers' interrogation of the students, particularly when their wallets were taken. As Carla struggles to take control of the situation, Kuhn crashes the meeting and informs the parents that Carla is being charged with making secret recordings and that she is not to be trusted. A shaken Carla flees to the bathroom, where she struggles to control a panic attack. The students begin to gossip as well, with Oskar insisting that his mother is not the thief, and becoming upset that his mother has been fired. The students rally on behalf of Oskar and refuse to do homework or participate in class. Oskar later attacks a student who failed to participate in this solidarity and then steals Carla's laptop, striking her with it and then escaping to the nearby river, where he disposes of the laptop.

Carla, understanding that Oskar was trying to protect his mother, covers for him and is against pursuing disciplinary action, but the other teachers are wary of keeping Oskar in class due to his violent tendencies. The meeting is interrupted by Carla's students, who run the school newspaper and had scheduled an interview with her. After a regular and innocent set of questions, the students abruptly begin interrogating Carla about the secret recording, the thefts, accusations against Ali, and Kuhn's dismissal. Carla, caught off-guard, gives vague and broad responses and is refused the opportunity to review the interview ahead of the printing of the newspaper. When it is published, Carla is dismayed to find her statements twisted and taken out of context. The paper quickly spreads and angers the other teachers, who blame Carla for not being more cooperative and forthcoming. The principal decides to ban the distribution of the newspaper and suspends Oskar.

Oskar returns to class regardless, and the principal threatens to have him removed, which could get him expelled. After failing to get Kuhn to collect her son, Carla has the class leave with another teacher and sits quietly with Oskar. He quickly solves the Rubik's cube that she had gifted him earlier. He is then carried out of school by police officers, calm and dignified.

== Cast ==
- Leonie Benesch as Carla Nowak
- Michael Klammer as Thomas Liebenwerda
- Rafael Stachowiak as Milosz Dudek
- Anne-Kathrin Gummich as Dr. Bettina Böhm
- Eva Löbau as Friederike Kuhn

Michael O'Sullivan of the Washington Post praised Benesch's "subtly expressive" performance.

== Production ==
The inspiration for the story came from a school visit in Istanbul where İlker Çatak and Johannes Duncker witnessed "these two boys in class that were actually stealing. And we all knew it, but nobody wanted to be the snitch. But at some point, the school found out and they came into the class, and it was kind of a trap for them, where they said, 'Girls — out. Boys — put your wallets on the table, and come to the front of the room.' And they found all that money in their pockets. When we talked about it later, Johannes and I thought it could be a good kickoff for a story. And then Johannes told me a story about his sister, who's a maths teacher in Cologne in Germany, who had a similar kind of thing going on with thefts. There was a secretary involved and all. What we thought was interesting is when a society, such as a school community, is being poisoned with all this speculation and these prejudices and stuff like that. We quickly realized that this could also be a film about our times, about the societies that we live in."

The film was created in three years, from conception to completion. The film was shot in 27 days at a disused school in Hamburg that was scheduled to be razed.

Çatak stated that Carla was made younger so she would possess idealism. The creation of the character was inspired by "two or three very good teachers" though they were older than Carla. The director did not want to make Carla as an older teacher with burnout. For the student characters, the director chose actors who had no previous experience in professional film as a way of accurately portraying students.

== Release ==
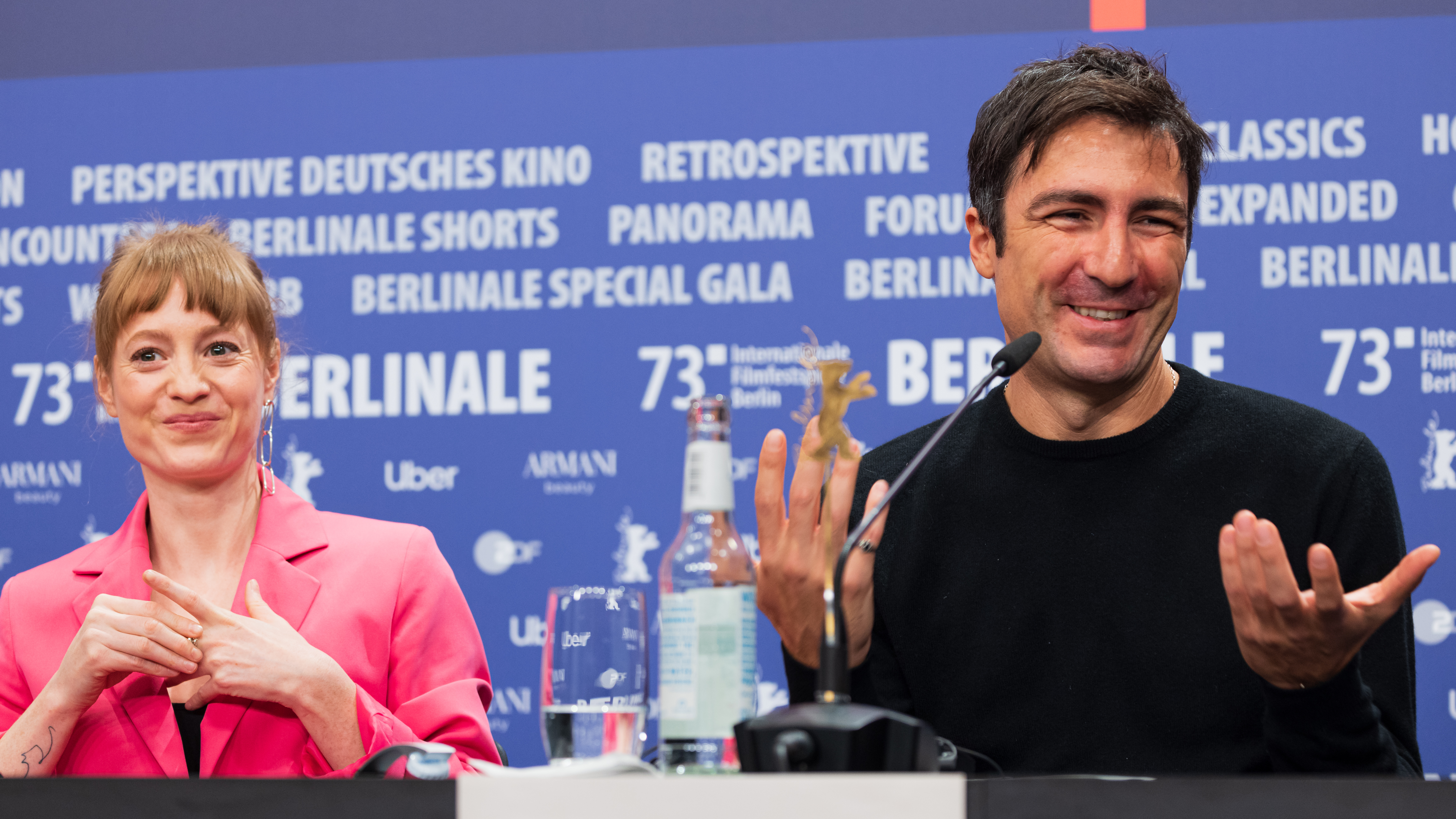
Benesch and Çatak promoting The Teachers' Lounge premiered at the 73rd Berlin Film Festival.

The Teachers' Lounge premiered at the 73rd Berlin Film Festival. It was an official selection at the 48th Toronto International Film Festival and 28th Busan International Film Festival in 2023.

== Reception ==
=== Critical response ===
On the review aggregator website Rotten Tomatoes, 96% of 133 critics' reviews are positive, with an average rating of 8.2/10. The website's consensus reads: "A smart and provocative modern parable with the heart of a thriller, The Teachers' Lounge brilliantly uses its setting as the backdrop for a look at how quickly even tight-knit communities can be destabilized." Metacritic, which uses a weighted average, assigned the film a score of 82 out of 100, based on 21 critics, indicating "universal acclaim".

The Frankfurter Allgemeine Zeitung found that in the film, "Much of what concerns society at large – the difficulty of dealing with diversity, multidimensional identities, cultural stereotypes - is made concrete in school, as if under a magnifying glass". while NDR wrote, "The Teachers' Lounge is a bitter lesson in self-righteousness. There is something both comical and tragic about the fact that the person with the best intentions sets off the worst chain reaction. This drama eludes a clear reading – which makes the cinema experience all the more interesting!"

A positive review for Filmdienst wonders, "Despite all the enthusiasm that the film, which was tense from start to finish, generated at the premiere at the Berlinale, it was rightly noted that it was not entirely clear what The Teachers' Lounge was actually trying to achieve. The director İlker Çatak says that it's not about making a statement, 'but about asking a question'."

Der Tagespiegel, considering the film in a broader context, wrote that it "shows very pointedly how little can be enough to make dialogue impossible in our highly sensitive times. School is the exemplary place where our “culture wars” are fought because this is where the next generation is already being prepared for the demands of the future."

Alissa Wilkinson of The New York Times wrote that the work "is strongest on the allegorical level."

=== Accolades ===
Award	Date	Category	Recipient	Result	Ref.
Academy Awards	10 March 2024	Best International Feature Film	The Teachers' Lounge	Nominated	
Alliance of Women Film Journalists	4 January 2024	Best Non-English-Language Film	The Teachers' Lounge	Nominated	
Astra Film Awards	6 January 2024	Best International Feature	The Teachers' Lounge	Nominated	
Astra Film Awards	6 January 2024	Best International Actress	Leonie Benesch	Nominated	
Belgian Film Critics Association	4 January 2025	Grand Prix	The Teachers' Lounge	Nominated	
Berlin International Film Festival	25 February 2023	Panorama Audience Award for Best Feature Film	The Teachers' Lounge	Nominated	
Berlin International Film Festival	25 February 2023	Cicae Art Cinema Prizes	The Teachers' Lounge	Won	
Chicago Film Critics Association Awards	12 December 2023	Best Foreign Language Film	The Teachers' Lounge	Nominated	
European Film Academy	16 March 2024	Lux Award	The Teachers' Lounge	Won	
European Film Awards	9 December 2023	Best European Screenwriter	İlker Çatak, Johannes Duncker	Nominated	
European Film Awards	9 December 2023	Best European Actress	Leonie Benesch	Nominated	
European Film Awards	9 December 2023	European University Film Award	The Teachers' Lounge	Nominated	
German Film Awards	12 May 2023	Best Fiction Film	The Teachers' Lounge	Won	
German Film Awards	12 May 2023	Best Director	Ilker Çatak	Won	
German Film Awards	12 May 2023	Best Performance by an Actress in a Leading Role	Leonie Benesch	Won	
German Film Awards	12 May 2023	Best Screenplay	İlker Çatak, Johannes Duncker	Won	
German Film Awards	12 May 2023	Best Cinematography	Judith Kaufmann	Nominated	
German Film Awards	12 May 2023	Best Editing	Gesa Jäger	Won	
German Film Awards	12 May 2023	Best Film Score	Marvin Miller	Nominated	
Goya Awards	10 February 2024	Best European Film	The Teachers' Lounge	Nominated	
Haifa International Film Festival	6 October 2023	Best International Film	The Teachers' Lounge	Nominated	
Les Arcs Film Festival	23 December 2023	Cineuropa Award	The Teachers' Lounge	Pending	
National Board of Review	6 December 2023	Top Five International Films	The Teachers' Lounge	Won (Note: This award does not have a single winner, but recognizes multiple films.)	
Palm Springs International Film Festival	15 January 2024	Best International Feature Film	The Teachers' Lounge	Pending	
St. Louis Film Critics Association	17 December 2023	Best International Film	The Teachers' Lounge	Nominated	
Satellite Awards	17 February 2024	Best Motion Picture – International	The Teachers' Lounge	Nominated	
Valladolid International Film Festival	28 October 2023	Best Editing	Gesa Jäger	Won	
Washington D.C. Area Film Critics Association Awards	10 December 2023	Best Foreign Language Film	The Teachers' Lounge	Nominated	
Women Film Critics Circle	18 December 2023	Best Foreign Film by or about Women	The Teachers' Lounge	Nominated	

== See also ==
- List of submissions to the 96th Academy Awards for Best International Feature Film
- List of German submissions for the Academy Award for Best International Feature Film
