= Esther Gronenborn =

German film director and screenwriter (born 1968)

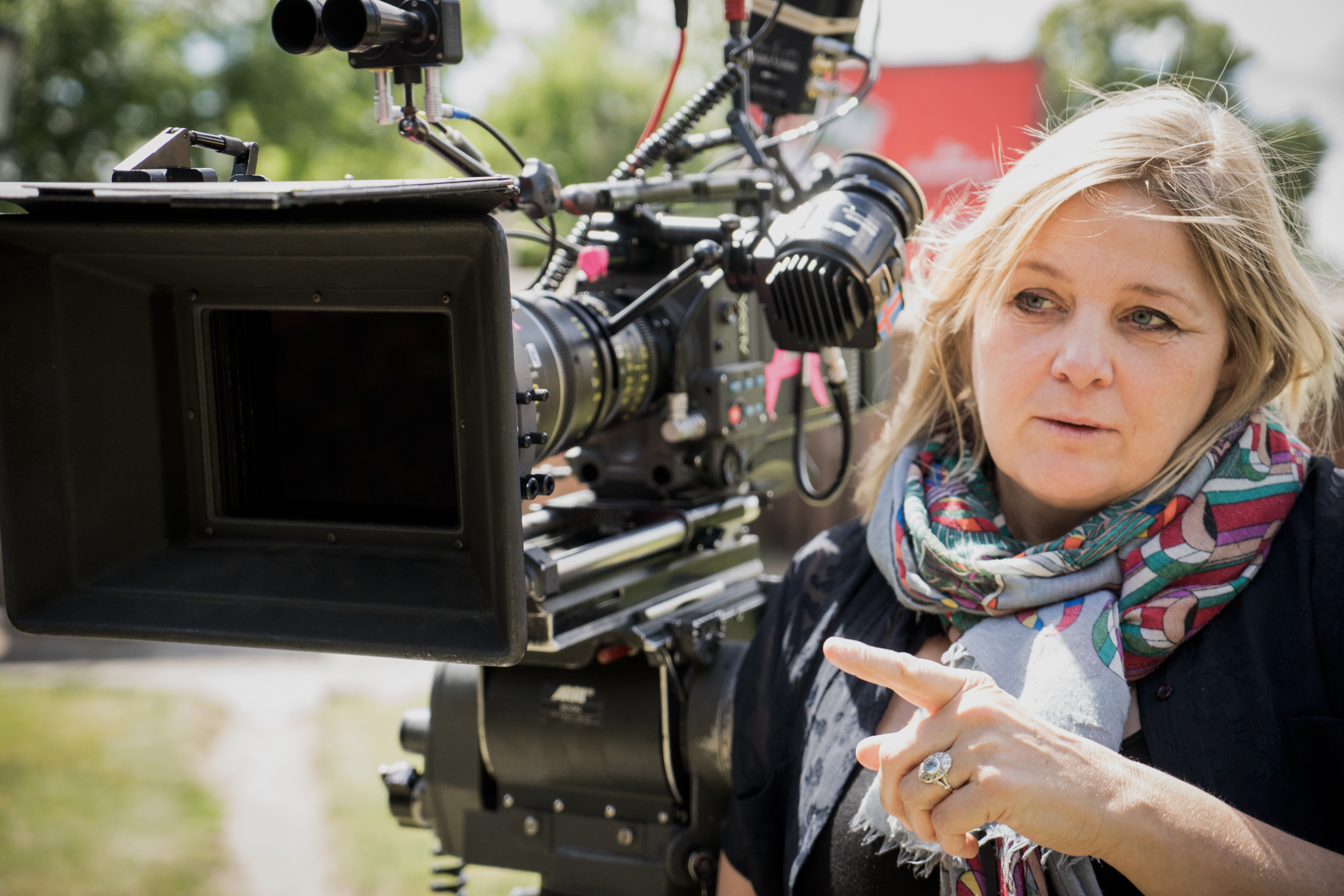
Esther Gronenborn (2016)

Esther Gronenborn (born 1968 in Oldenburg) is a German film director and screenwriter. Films she wrote and directed include Alaska.de (2000), Adil geht (2005), Berlin Stories (2005), and a segment of 99euro-films (2001). She has also been a director of the TV series Galileo Mystery.
