= Alaska.de =

2000 film

- Directed by: Esther Gronenborn
- Starring: Jana Pallaske; Frank Droese
- Release date: 15 September 2000 (TIFF)
- Running time: 89 min
- Country: Germany
- Language: German

Alaska.de is a 2000 German drama film directed by Esther Gronenborn.
