= The Pedestrian (film) =

1973 film by Maximilian Schell

- Directed by: Maximilian Schell
- Produced by: Zev Braun; Maximilian Schell; Franz Seitz Jr.
- Music by: Manos Hatzidakis
- Production companies: Alfa Film; Braun; Braun Entertainment Group; Franz Seitz Filmproduktion; MFG-Film
- Distributed by: Cinerama Releasing Corporation
- Release date: 6 September 1973
- Running time: 97 minutes
- Countries: Germany; Switzerland; Israel
- Language: German

The Pedestrian (German: Der Fußgänger) is a 1973 film directed by Maximilian Schell. It is about the trial of an elderly war criminal. The film was a co-production between companies in Germany, Switzerland and Israel; the movie was distributed in the United States by Cinerama Releasing Corporation.

== Plot ==
A tabloid newspaper is investigating the life of industrialist and state parliament member Heinz Alfred Giese, following a car accident that resulted in the death of his son Andreas. Although a case for negligent homicide was dropped due to evidence that Andreas had interfered with the steering wheel, Giese's driver's license was revoked, and he was sentenced to traffic lessons. Sensing a scandal, the tabloid delves into Giese's past.

The newspaper surveils Giese, documenting his activities such as a visit to the Natural History Museum with his grandson, rendezvous with his lover, and attendance at a class. They covertly follow him, photographing his movements, waiting outside his house, and even breaking in to steal a picture from his youth. Suspicions arise regarding Giese's involvement in the wartime liquidation of a Greek village. However, incriminating photos are inconclusive, leaving doubts about Giese's direct participation.

Despite lacking concrete evidence, the newspaper publishes an article insinuating Giese's connection to the massacre, sparking public outrage. Riots erupt outside Giese's company, with him being labeled a "murderer." Giese obtains a defamation injunction, but faces further scrutiny on a televised discussion where his silence is interpreted as guilt. The newspaper also suggests a link between Andreas' death and a potential dispute over Giese's past.

Returning home, Giese confides in his son Hubert, urging to leave the past behind and avoid being tainted by his family's history.

== Cast ==
- Gustav Rudolf Sellner - Heinz Alfred Giese

In alphabetical order:

- Peggy Ashcroft - Lady Gray
- Gertrud Bald - Henriette Markowitz
- Elisabeth Bergner - Frau Lilienthal
- Lil Dagover - Frau Eschenlohr
- Käthe Haack - Frau von Rautenfeld
- Peter Hall - Rudolf Hartmann
- Ruth Hausmeister - Inge Marie Giese
- Dagmar Hirtz - Elke Giese
- Johanna Hofer - Frau Bergedorf
- Silvia Hürlimann - Hilde
- Christian Kohlund - Erwin Gotz
- Walter Kohut - Dr. Rolf Meineke
- Alexander May - Alexander Markowitz
- Herbert Mensching - Reporter
- Peter Moland - Reporter
- Françoise Rosay - Madame Dechamps
- Maximilian Schell - Andreas Giese
- Margarete Schell Noé - Frau Buchmann
- Norbert Schiller - Himself
- Walter Schmidinger - Policeman
- Franz Seitz - Dr. Karl Peters
- Manuel Sellner - Hubert Giese
- Sigfrit Steiner - Auditor
- Walter Varndal - Dr. Kratxer
- Gila von Weitershausen - Karin
- Elsa Wagner - Elsa Giese

== Awards ==
The Pedestrian won the 1974 Golden Globe for Best Motion Picture – Non-English Language.

The film was nominated for the Academy Award for Best Foreign Language Film at the 46th Academy Awards. It was also nominated for Best Foreign Language Film by the U.S. National Board of Review.

== See also ==
- List of submissions to the 46th Academy Awards for Best Foreign Language Film
- List of German submissions for the Academy Award for Best Foreign Language Film
