= Fabian: Going to the Dogs =

2021 film by Dominik Graf

- Theatrical release poster
- German: Fabian oder Der Gang vor die Hunde
- Directed by: Dominik Graf
- Screenplay by: Constantin Lieb; Dominik Graf
- Based on: Fabian. Die Geschichte eines Moralisten by Erich Kästner
- Produced by: Felix von Boehm
- Starring: Tom Schilling; Saskia Rosendahl; Albrecht Schuch; Aljoscha Stadelmann; Petra Kalkutschke; Oliver Reinhard; Michael Hanemann; Anne Bennent; Meret Becker
- Cinematography: Hanno Lentz
- Edited by: Claudia Wolscht
- Music by: Sven Rossenbach; Florian van Volxem
- Production companies: Lupa Film; DCM Pictures; ZDF; Arte; Amilux Film; Studio Babelsberg
- Distributed by: DCM Film Distribution
- Release dates: 2 March 2021 (Berlinale); 5 August 2021 (Germany)
- Running time: 176 minutes
- Country: Germany
- Language: German
- Box office: $27,305

Fabian: Going to the Dogs (German: Fabian oder Der Gang vor die Hunde, lit. 'Fabian or The Walk to the Dogs') is a 2021 German drama film directed by Dominik Graf from a screenplay he co-wrote with Constantin Lieb, based on Erich Kästner's 1931 novel Fabian. Die Geschichte eines Moralisten.

The film had its worldwide premiere at the 71st Berlin International Film Festival in March 2021.

== Plot ==
In 1931, Jakob Fabian works as a copywriter for a cigarette company in Berlin. He aspires to become an author, while his hedonistic best friend, Stephan Labude, wishes to work in academia. The two often spend their evenings visiting brothels and clubs. Fabian holds a nihilistic view on love and life, having been traumatized by his experience as a soldier in World War I.

During one of his outings at an underground club, Fabian meets Cornelia, an aspiring film actress. He falls in love with her and they begin a romantic relationship; although she cares for Fabian, Cornelia shows some ambivalence about whether the relationship will last. Fabian, Cornelia and Labude begin to spend time together. At one point, they swim in a lake despite Fabian's weak swimming skills. They also stay at Labude's father's countryside home, where Cornelia makes Fabian sign a contract stating that he will not impede her career no matter what.

In the midst of soaring unemployment and poverty in Germany, Fabian is laid off from his job. In contrast, Cornelia's career begins to take off as she acquiesces to sexual advances from Makart, an older film producer. Fabian argues with Cornelia about her actions, though she promises that it will help "to make things work" for them. They express their love for one another, though she abruptly moves out of her lodging the next morning.

While his relationship with his fiancée crumbles, Labude submits a thesis to Berlin University, hoping that it will be accepted. He has an antagonistic relationship with Weckherlin, the chancellor's assistant. With the Nazi Party on the rise and beginning to impede on German life, Labude is arrested for his support of communism and holding rallies for dockworkers. He is soon bailed out by his father.

Fabian visits a film studio where Cornelia is auditioning for a film role. She performs a heartfelt monologue, which impresses Makart and the other producers, and they give her the leading role. The monologue is in fact a letter to Fabian, imploring for them to meet again at a nearby café. When they meet, Fabian is cold towards her, arguing that the contract she had coerced him into signing was for her to commit infidelity without guilt. This upsets her, though Fabian soon apologizes and the two renew their continued support for one another.

Labude is declared missing, with his father and Fabian searching for him in Berlin together. Some time later, Fabian finds Labude on a binge at a nude art studio. The latter has received a letter from his university, but has not yet opened it.

Shortly after, Fabian is contacted by the police, who drive him to Labude's fathers' residence. There, he is shocked to discover Labude dead from a self-inflicted gunshot wound. After confirming Labude's identity, Fabian reads his suicide note; Labude laments his failed relationship and his rejection by the university, declaring that he is not good at anything else and implores Fabian to "live a better life" than his. An upset Fabian confronts the university chancellor about the rejection letter, who is confused as he had actually accepted the thesis. Realizing that Weckherlin had forged the letter as a prank, Fabian lunges at him and beats him almost to death before being restrained by witnesses.

With no ties left to Berlin, Fabian returns to his hometown in Dresden. As he slowly recovers from his grief, he sees Cornelia in a magazine, having become a film star. He reaches out to her and she calls back, confiding in him that although she has become successful, she is not happy. The conversation becomes light-hearted and they make plans to meet at a café in Berlin.

Excited to see Cornelia again, Fabian packs a suitcase and walks to the train station. On his way there, he sees three boys playing in a lake, reminding him of his time with Labude and Cornelia. He spots a boy standing on a bridge, appearing to attempt suicide. Fabian calls for the boy not to jump, but the boy does not hear him and falls into the water. Instinctively, Fabian jumps into the lake to save the boy. He is unable to pull himself out of a current and he drowns. The boy survives and emerges onto the shore, seeing Fabian's belongings strewn everywhere but remaining unaware of what had just occurred. In Berlin, Cornelia waits for Fabian.

== Cast ==
- Tom Schilling as Dr. Jakob Fabian
- Saskia Rosendahl as Cornelia Battenberg
- Albrecht Schuch as Stephan Labude
- Meret Becker as Irene Moll
- Michael Wittenborn as Judicial Council Labude
- Petra Kalkutschke as Mrs. Fabian
- Elmar Gutman as Mr. Fabian
- Aljoscha Stadelmann as Makart
- Eva Medusa Gühne as Mrs. Hohfeld
- Lena Baader as Selow
- Luise Aschenbrenner as Kulp
- Oliver Reinhard as Breitkopf
- Michael Hanemann as Labudes professor
- Lukas Rüppel as Weckherlin
- Jörg-Uwe Schröder as Dr. Moll

== Release ==
On February 11, 2021, Berlinale announced that the film would have its worldwide premiere at the 71st Berlin International Film Festival in the Berlinale Competition section, in March 2021. The film was released theatrically in Germany on 5 August 2021.

== Reception ==
At its premiere, the film received mostly positive reviews. On review aggregator Metacritic, the film holds an approval rating of 68 based on 6 reviews.
