= The Devil Strikes at Night =

1957 film by Robert Siodmak

- Original German poster
- Directed by: Robert Siodmak
- Written by: Will Berthold (book); Werner Jörg Lüddecke
- Produced by: Robert Siodmak; Walter Traut; Claus Hardt
- Starring: Mario Adorf; Claus Holm; Hannes Messemer; Werner Peters
- Cinematography: Georg Krause
- Edited by: Walter Boos
- Music by: Siegfried Franz
- Production company: Divina Film
- Distributed by: Gloria Film
- Release date: 19 September 1957
- Running time: 105 minutes
- Country: West Germany
- Language: German

The Devil Strikes at Night (German: Nachts, wenn der Teufel kam) is a 1957 West German crime thriller film directed by Robert Siodmak and starring Claus Holm, Mario Adorf and Hannes Messemer. The film noir is based on the true story of Bruno Lüdke. It was shot at the Baldham Studios. The film's sets were designed by the art directors Gottfried Will and Rolf Zehetbauer. Location shooting took place in Berlin and Munich. It was nominated for the Academy Award for Best Foreign Language Film, as well as winning German Film Award for Best Fiction Film in its native country.

== Synopsis ==
The film is a highly fictionalized account of the hunt for a serial killer, as he murders women during the last year or two of World War II. In one of the crimes, a man is arrested who is obviously innocent. An investigator begins to unravel a thread leading to the real killer, but becomes frustrated by Nazi authorities who believe that revealing the truth will undermine people's faith in their supposedly infallible system. The detective story gradually evolves into a narrative about the evils of political propaganda and corruption.

== Cast ==
- Claus Holm as Kriminalkommissar Axel Kersten
- Annemarie Düringer as Helga Hornung
- Mario Adorf as Bruno Lüdke
- Hannes Messemer as SS-Gruppenführer Rossdorf
- Carl Lange as Major Thomas Wollenberg
- Werner Peters as Willi Keun
- Walter Janssen as Kriminalrat Boehm
- Peter Carsten as SS-Standartenführer Mollwitz
- Wilmut Borell as SS-Sturmbannfuhrer Heinrich, Rossdorf's aide
- Ernst Fritz Fürbringer as Dr. Schleffien
- Monika John as Lucy Hansen, Kellnerin
- Rosl Schäfer as Anna Hohmann
- Lukas Ammann as Pflichtverteidiger von Keun
- Karl-Heinz Peters as Hauswart
- Helmut Brasch as SS-Truppenführer Scharf
- Georg Lehn as Kriminalassistent Brühl
- Margaret Jahnen as Frau Weinberger
- Käthe Itter as Portiersfrau
- Else Quecke as Frau Lehmann
- Christa Nielsen as Schlampilein
- Alois Maria Giani as Gefängniswärter

== Controversy ==
It has since been concluded that Lüdke, who was mentally disabled, was almost certainly innocent of all of the murders to which he had confessed. Today, most historians believe he was the victim of a frame-up by the police. Due to his intellectual disabilities, he was a convenient scapegoat for the Nazi government, which saw such people as inferior.

In 2021, a Stolperstein was erected at Lüdke's former home in memory of him as a victim of the Nazi regime. The campaign was initiated by the actor Mario Adorf, who had played Lüdke and later regretted the role after his near-certain innocence was established.

== See also ==
- List of submissions to the 30th Academy Awards for Best Foreign Language Film
- List of German submissions for the Academy Award for Best Foreign Language Film

== Bibliography ==
- Fisher, Jaimey (ed.). Generic Histories of German Cinema: Genre and Its Deviations. Boydell & Brewer, 2013.
- Noack, Frank. Veit Harlan: The Life and Work of a Nazi Filmmaker. University Press of Kentucky, 2016.
- Spicer, Andrew. Historical Dictionary of Film Noir. Scarecrow Press, 2010.
