= Artists Under the Big Top: Perplexed =

1968 film

- Film poster
- Directed by: Alexander Kluge
- Written by: Alexander Kluge
- Starring: Hannelore Hoger
- Release dates: September 1968 (Venice); 29 October 1968
- Running time: 104 minutes
- Country: West Germany
- Language: German

Artists in the Big Top: Perplexed (German: Die Artisten in der Zirkuskuppel: ratlos) is a 1968 West German film written and directed by Alexander Kluge. The film is made in a collage style, featuring newsreels and quotations from philosophers alongside the story of a failing circus whose owner, Leni (Hannelore Hoger), must decide whether her dream of a new kind of circus is too optimistic. The film is a symbolic representation of Kluge's own frustrations in trying to help stimulate the New German Cinema movement.

== Cast ==
- Hannelore Hoger as Leni Peickert
- Sigi Graue as Manfred Peickert (as Siegfried Graue)
- Alfred Edel as Dr. Busch
- Bernd Höltz as Herr von Lueptow
- Eva Oertel as Gitti Bornemann
- Kurt Jürgens as Mackensen, Dompteur
- Gilbert Houcke as Houke, Dompteur
- Wanda Bronska-Pampuch as Frau Saizewa
- Herr Jobst as Impresario
- Hans-Ludger Schneider as Assessor Korti
- Klaus Schwarzkopf as Gerloff, Philologe

== Awards ==
The film won the Golden Lion at the Venice Film Festival. The film was also selected as the West German entry for the Best Foreign Language Film at the 41st Academy Awards, but was not accepted as a nominee.

== See also ==
- List of submissions to the 41st Academy Awards for Best Foreign Language Film
- List of German submissions for the Academy Award for Best Foreign Language Film
