= Dying (2024 film) =

- Theatrical poster
- Directed by: Matthias Glasner
- Written by: Matthias Glasner
- Produced by: Jan Krüger; Matthias Glasner; Ulf Israel
- Starring: Lars Eidinger; Corinna Harfouch; Lilith Stangenberg
- Cinematography: Jakub Bejnarowicz
- Edited by: Heike Gnida
- Music by: Lorenz Dangel
- Production companies: Port au Prince; Schwarzweiss Filmproduktion; Senator Film; ZDF; Arte
- Distributed by: Wild Bunch
- Release dates: 16 February 2024 (Berlin); 25 April 2024 (Germany); 9 June 2024 (Sydney)
- Running time: 182 minutes
- Country: Germany
- Language: German English Latvian

Dying (German: Sterben) is a 2024 German comedy drama film. It is about an elderly couple on the brink of death and their two children who are too concerned with their own troubles to get involved. The film premiered at the 74th Berlin International Film Festival on 16 February 2024, and won Best Picture at the 2024 German Film Awards.

== Synopsis ==
Dying follows the lives of an estranged family of four: Tom Lunies, a conductor in Berlin; his sister Ellen Lunies, an alcoholic dental assistant; and their elderly parents Lissy and Gerd. Lissy has many ailments and is only semi-mobile, while Gerd has dementia and tends to wander into other people's homes. Tom, an emotionally cold character, is preparing to conduct an orchestral project called Dying (Sterben), composed by Bernard, his chronically depressed friend of twenty years.

== Cast ==
- Lars Eidinger as Tom Lunies
- Lilith Stangenberg as Ellen Lunies
- Corinna Harfouch as Lissy Lunies
- Hans-Uwe Bauer as Gerd Lunies
- Robert Gwisdek as Bernard
- Ronald Zehrfeld as Sebastian Vogel
- Saskia Rosendahl as Ronja
- Anna Bederke as Liv
- Saerom Park as Mi-Do

== Production ==
The film was written and directed by Matthias Glasner, and co-produced by Glasner, Jan Krueger, and Ulf Israel. Cinematography was by Jakub Bejnarowicz, and the musical score was composed by Lorenz Dnagel. Heike Gnida edited the film.

Dying has been described as black comedy. It is divided into five different chapters over its three-hour length.

Actor Lars Eidinger had to learn how to conduct an orchestra (as did Cate Blanchett for Tár), and he said that he modelled his performance on Greek conductor Teodor Currentzis.

== Release ==
The film had its world premiere on 16 February 2024 at the 74th Berlin International Film Festival.

It played at the Sydney Film Festival on 9 June 2024, and also screened at the Adelaide Film Festival in October 2024.

== Reception ==
=== Critical response ===
On review aggregator Rotten Tomatoes, the film holds an approval rating of 100% based on 21 reviews, with an average rating of 8.6/10. Metacritic, which uses a weighted average, assigned the film a score of 80 out of 100, based on 6 critics, indicating "generally favorable reviews".

Peter Bradshaw of The Guardian gave it 4 out of 5 stars, calling it "a black comedy of Franzenesque family dysfunction; maybe not profound exactly but terrifically watchable and entertaining". The Hollywood Reporter called it "to die for", writing "Out of all the film’s many achievements, perhaps the most impressive is the ability to keep the tone balanced just on this biting point between tragedy and comedy in scene after scene".

=== Awards and nominations ===
- 74th Berlin International Film Festival 2024
  - Silver Bear for Best Screenplay
  - Guild Film Prize
  - Golden Bear (nominated)
- German Film Award 2024
  - Best Fiction Film
  - Best Actress – Corinna Harfouch
  - Best Supporting Actor – Hans-Uwe Bauer
  - Best Original Score
  - Best Director (nominated)
  - Best Screenplay (nominated)
  - Best Actor – Lars Eidinger (nominated)
  - Best Supporting Actor – Robert Gwisdek (nominated)
  - Best Editing (nominated)
- Sydney Film Festival 2024
  - Best Picture (nominated)
