= Stopped on Track =

2011 film

- Film poster
- German: Halt auf Freier Strecke
- Directed by: Andreas Dresen
- Written by: Andreas Dresen, Cooky Ziesche
- Produced by: Peter Rommel
- Starring: Steffi Kühnert; Milan Peschel
- Cinematography: Michael Hammon
- Edited by: Jörg Hauschild
- Music by: Jens Quandt
- Production companies: RBB Fernsehen; Arte
- Distributed by: Pandora Film
- Release dates: 15 May 2011 (Cannes); 17 November 2011 (Germany)
- Running time: 110 minutes
- Country: Germany
- Language: German

Stopped on Track (German: Halt auf Freier Strecke) is a 2011 German drama film directed by Andreas Dresen. It premiered in the Un Certain Regard section at the 2011 Cannes Film Festival. The film won the Prize Un Certain Regard, the top award for best film in the section. The win was shared with the South Korean film Arirang, directed by Kim Ki-duk.

== Plot ==
The 44-year-old family man Frank Lange has a proper job and lives with his wife Simone and their children Lilly and Mika in a modern serial house when he learns he suffers with an inoperable brain tumour and has only but a short time left. Supported by his family he uses an iPod to keep daily records of his decline. Radiation therapy and chemical treatment take their toll on him. Eventually he grows too weak to leave the house and has hallucinations during which his tumour seems to appear as a vain actor in a late-night talk show hosted by Germany's established TV presenter Harald Schmidt. His children are increasingly overstrained and so is his wife Simone. The tumour deprives Frank from memory, orientational ability and even control of basic body functions. Fighting the pain with always stronger doses of morphium he loses his true personality and finally his speech. Having become a nursing case of the highest degree he dies at last in his home amidst his family. When actually everybody is lost for words, his daughter Lilly, an ambitious diver, utters: "I have to attend training".

== Cast ==
- Milan Peschel as Frank
- Steffi Kühnert as Simone
- Mika Seidel as Mika
- Talisa Lilli Lemke as Lilly
- Otto Mellies as Frank's father Ernst
- Christine Schorn as Frank's mother
- Ursula Werner as Simone's mother
- Marie Rosa Tietjen as Simone's sister
- Harald Schmidt as himself

== Reception ==
Authenticity is key to the success of Dresen's film

— Daniel Green – CineVue

== Accolades ==
- Rated as Besonders wertvoll (English: "Especially valuable") by Deutsche Film- und Medienbewertung
- 2012 Deutscher Filmpreis
