= Berlin Alexanderplatz (2020 film) =

German 2020 film

- Film poster
- Directed by: Burhan Qurbani
- Screenplay by: Burhan Qurbani; Martin Behnke
- Based on: Berlin Alexanderplatz by Alfred Döblin
- Produced by: Leif Alexis; Jochen Laube; Fabian Maubach
- Starring: Welket Bunguê; Jella Haase; Albrecht Schuch; Joachim Król
- Narrated by: Jella Haase
- Cinematography: Yoshi Heimrath
- Edited by: Philipp Thomas
- Music by: Dascha Dauenhauer
- Production companies: Entertainment One Germany; Sommerhaus Filmproduktion; Wild at Art; ZDF
- Distributed by: Paramount Pictures
- Release dates: 26 February 2020 (Berlinale); 16 July 2020 (Germany)
- Running time: 183 minutes
- Countries: Germany; Netherlands; Canada
- Language: German

Berlin Alexanderplatz is a 2020 drama film directed by Burhan Qurbani. The third adaptation of Alfred Döblin's influential 1929 novel of the same name, following one in 1931 and a 1980 fourteen-part miniseries, this iteration transposes the story to the modern day with an undocumented immigrant from West Africa in the central role. It was selected to compete for the Golden Bear in the main competition section at the 70th Berlin International Film Festival.

== Cast ==
- Welket Bungué as Francis/Franz, an illegal immigrant from Guinea-Bissau, who wants to start a better life in Germany.
- Jella Haase as Mieze, a prostitute and love-interest of Francis, who is also the narrator of the film
- Albrecht Schuch as Reinhold, a criminal drug dealer
- Joachim Król as Pums
- Annabelle Mandeng as Eva
- Nils Verkooijen as Berta
- Richard Fouofié Djimeli as Ottu
- Thelma Buabeng as Amira
- Faris Saleh as Masud
- Lena Schmidtke as Elli

== Reception ==
Jessica Kiang for Variety detects some flaws in this update of Alfred Döblin's classic novel of masculine criminal crisis: ″Although promising a deep-cut dash of contemporary topicality by reimagining the main character as an undocumented African immigrant, there is the sense that the unimpeachable craft and performances — especially from rivetingly charismatic lead Welket Bungué — ultimately add up to just too slick a package. (...) For a film that is supposed to be a contemporary update, it can feel — especially in its ill-fated female characters, who are almost all either sex workers or one-night stands of Reinhold's — weirdly out of date. “Men like me have gone out of fashion,” says Pums at one point, and it will take more than a snazzy new set of clothes to complete the overhaul that Qurbani bravely, handsomely, but a little foolhardily attempts."

On review aggregator website Rotten Tomatoes, the film holds an approval rating of 47% based on 19 reviews, with an average rating of 7.1/10. The website's critical consensus states: "Berlin Alexanderplatz is ambitious and well-intentioned, but once the potent atmosphere settles and the contemporalities of the adaptation wear off, the movie disillusions". Metacritic, which uses a weighted average, assigned the film a score of 43 out of 100, based on 5 critics, indicating "mixed or average reviews".
