= System Crasher =

- Film poster
- Directed by: Nora Fingscheidt
- Written by: Nora Fingscheidt
- Produced by: Peter Hartwig; Jonas Weydemann; Jakob D. Weydemann
- Starring: Helena Zengel; Albrecht Schuch; Gabriela Maria Schmeide; Lisa Hagmeister
- Cinematography: Yunus Roy Imer
- Edited by: Stephan Bechinger; Julia Kovalenko
- Music by: John Gürtler
- Distributed by: Port au Prince Pictures
- Release dates: 8 February 2019 (Berlin); 19 September 2019 (Germany)
- Running time: 120 minutes
- Country: Germany
- Language: German
- Box office: $492,056

System Crasher (German: Systemsprenger) is a 2019 German drama film directed by Nora Fingscheidt.

== Plot ==
The nine-year-old Bernadette, known as “Benni”, is considered aggressive and wayward. If anyone but her mother touches her face, she lashes out – a consequence of a childhood trauma in which, according to the social worker, nappies were pressed into her face; this prompts other children to provoke her and set off an outburst of rage. She has been repeatedly suspended from her special school and no foster family or residential group can tolerate her for long. As a so-called “system crasher” she seems likely to fall through the framework of the German support system for children and youths. Benni just yearns to live with her mother again. However, it is also too much for Bianca, who is afraid of her own daughter. She is also mother to two more young children and is living with the abusive Jens, from whom she is unable to part. In one scene Benni runs away and hitch-hikes home to find her small siblings alone, unsupervised and watching horror films. Showing she can be caring, she switches over to a children’s channel against the wishes of her brother and prepares some food. When her mother returns with her current partner, whom she has for some time wanted to leave, Benni is at first overjoyed to see her but then explodes and with a vase attacks first Jens and then her mother who calls the police. Jens strikes Benni and shuts her in a wardrobe until the officers arrive.

In another effort, the dedicated Frau Bafané from youth services hires an anger-management trainer for Benni. Michael Heller, a boxing fan who has worked with male delinquents, is engaged to accompany her to school. After further violent outbursts, at his own suggestion, he takes her away to a lodge in the woods where he has previously taken the young offenders. This may be stretching “outdoor education”, but Benni goes along with him and he is able to engage with her. Benni sees him as a father figure, at one point even calling him “Papa”, which Micha will not allow, lest he lose his professional distance.

At the end of the visit, Benni clings to Micha and wants to stay with him. Micha, however, has his own family and would like to give up the case, but Frau Bafané persuades him to continue, as there are so few people on Benni’s side.

Benni’s mother tells her and the social workers that she has left her belligerent partner for good and will take Benni back home, but when she arrives at one of the few case meetings she actually attends, she tells Frau Bafané that she is scared of Benni and doesn't want her at home influencing her other two children. She then runs away from the meeting without saying goodbye to Benni. Frau Bafané breaks down in tears as she has to tell Benni of yet another disappointment, and Benni, oblivious to this, comforts her. Placement with a previous foster mother also fails when Benni seriously injures a foster child already there after the child unwittingly touches her face.

As a short-term measure, Benni is returned to the emergency accommodation where she had previously been. There are no specialist boarding schools for children as young as Benni and a stay abroad in Kenya is suggested as a last resort. Benni flees to Micha and his family, who are prepared to let her stay for one night. In the morning, while the parents are still sleeping, Benni goes into their bedroom and lifts the baby from his cot, takes him downstairs and carefully gives him breakfast. When the baby unwittingly touches Benni’s face, she makes no objection. On waking and coming to the kitchen, Elli, the baby’s mother, tries to take him back and Benni becomes aggressive. She refuses to let the baby go and locks herself in the bathroom. Micha breaks the door open, but Benni has fled through the window, leaving the baby unharmed. She runs in her socks and nightclothes into the nearby wood, where she collapses into confused dreams. Hours later she is found hypothermic and taken to hospital.

She is to be sent to Kenya, but at the airport she runs out of security. The last shot of the film is of Benni as she leaps into the air, smiling. The frame freezes and then cracks like broken glass.

== Cast ==
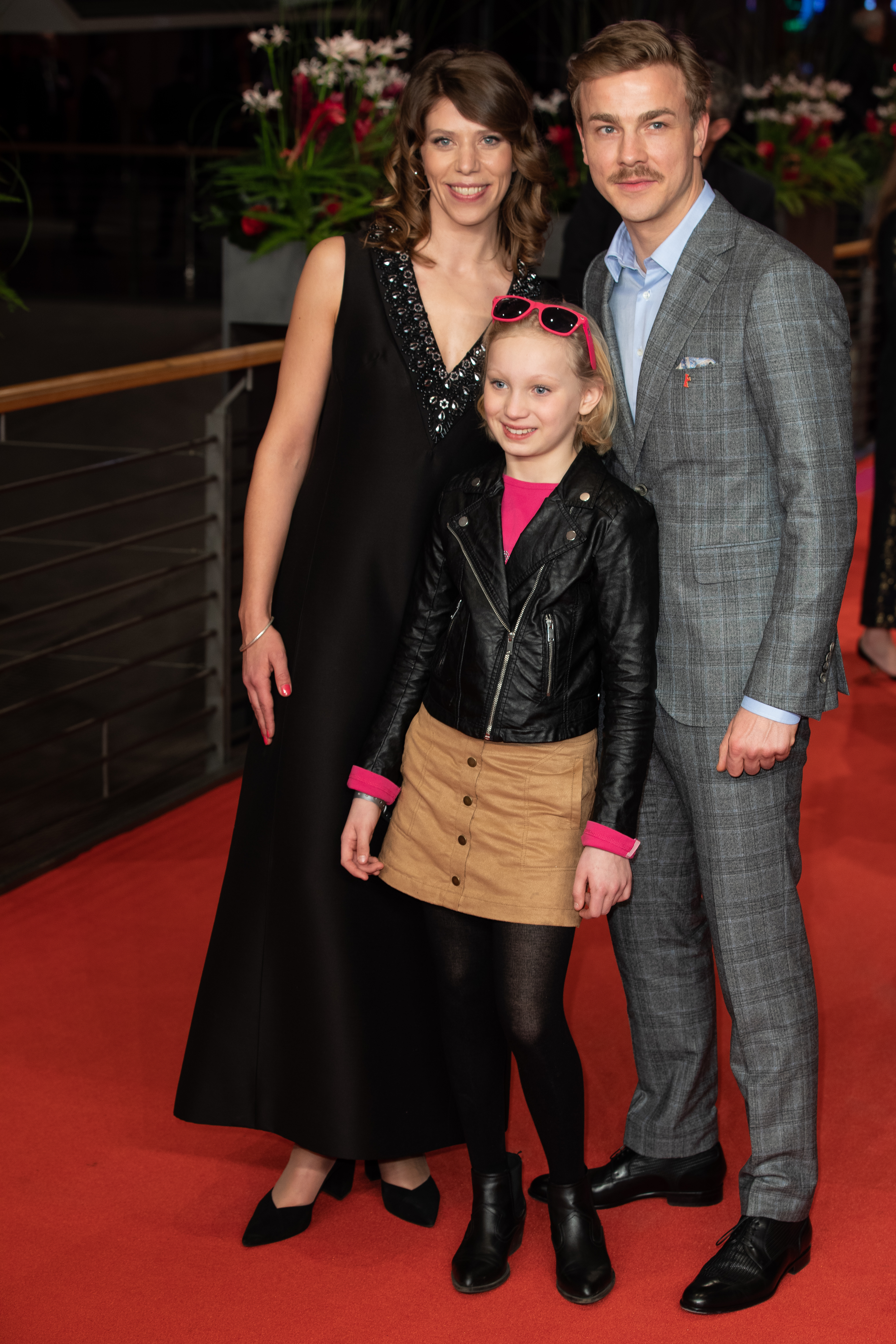
Director Nora Fingscheidt with actors Helena Zengel and Albrecht Schuch at the Berlinale 2019

- Helena Zengel as Bernadette (Benni)
- Albrecht Schuch as Michael Heller
- Gabriela Maria Schmeide as Frau Bafané
- Lisa Hagmeister as Bianca Klaaß
- Melanie Straub as Dr. Schönemann
- Victoria Trauttmansdorff as foster mother Silvia

== Development ==
System Crasher is Nora Fingscheidt’s first fiction feature film as director. Her attention was first drawn to the theme while filming the documentary Das Haus neben den Gleisen (2014) with Simone Gaul, which depicts life in a refuge for homeless women in Stuttgart. Among the women Fingscheidt met there was a fourteen-year-old girl, who as a system crasher was no longer accepted by any institution in the youth welfare service.

Fingscheidt wrote the screenplay after five years of research during which she lived or worked in residential groups, in a school for educational support, an emergency accommodation centre and a child psychiatry unit. She talked to staff at institutions and agencies as well as child and youth psychologists. Fingscheidt says she made System Crasher to raise awareness of severely traumatised children like Benni. It was a conscious decision to choose a nine-year-old girl with no background of migration and before the onset of puberty as the central figure, even though the majority of system crashers are boys. It was so that she “could keep away from clichés and rash categorisations” like the pubescent rebellion of a fourteen-year-old and similar imputations of gender or ethnicity. Making a documentary about system crashers was never an option for Fingscheidt: “I wanted to create a wild, high-energy audio-visual cinema experience that made no claim to be a record of reality. The reality is much worse.”

The Berlin child actor Helena Zengel was chosen for the lead role. Of the 150 or so girls Fingscheidt considered, Zengel made the shortlist of ten right from the start: the filmmaker kept coming back to her. According to Fingscheidt she was the only child who could portray the aggression together with the distress: “There was never anything merely spoilt or cheeky; it was always combined with fragility and vulnerability.”

In preparation for System Crasher Zengel’s mother read the screenplay with her daughter and six months before starting filming, Fingscheidt began working with the girl to ensure compatibility in the casting of even the smallest supporting roles. During the filming itself, lines and scenes were rehearsed with Zengel a day in advance.

Filming took place in coproduction with Kleinen Fernsehspiel from ZDF in Hamburg, Lüneburger Heide and Berlin. The Weydemann Bros. GmbH, Kineo Filmproduktion and Oma Inge Film production was shot from 7 November 2017 to 27 March 2018.

== Reception ==
Fingscheidt's yet to be filmed screenplay was awarded the Kompagnon-Förder Prize in the Berlinale Talents programme at the 2017 Berlin International Film Festival. The jury, led by Feo Aladag, Sigrid Hoerner and Johannes Naber, praised the script as a “nightmarish, sensitive and meticulously researched commentary on [the German] pedagogic system and a moving, humanist plea for the ‘difficult’, the non-conformist, the presumed dysfunctional”

At its premiere, System Crasher received two stars out of a possible four in the international critical barometer Screen International, thereby achieving 11th place among the 16 Berlinale competition entries while Emin Alper's A Tale of Three Sisters and Nadav Lapid's Synonymes (3 stars each) headed the list.

Oliver Kaever (Spiegel Online) described System Crasher in a brief review as “the opposite of a family-film” and praised the actors’ performances as “magnificent”, especially the female lead Helena Zengel. According to Kaever, “System Crasher is a typical debut film: profuse in the choice of cinematic devices, dramaturgically meandering and too long, but its raw, unpolished energy enlivened the pretty dull opening phase of the Berlinale competition.”

Verena Lueken (Frankfurter Allgemeine Zeitung) likewise praised Zengel and described the film as “a surprise”: Fingscheidt hadn't made a social drama but “body cinema”, and also noted the effective soundtrack. In his review of the ending Berlinale, Wenke Husmann (Zeit Online) rated the film alongside Angela Schanelec's Ich war zuhause, aber… as “outstanding”.

== Awards ==
System Crasher was selected to compete for the Golden Bear at the 69th Berlin International Film Festival. It won the Alfred Bauer Prize at the festival. It was selected as the German entry for the Best International Feature Film at the 92nd Academy Awards, but it was not nominated. The film received 3 nominations to the 32nd European Film Awards, including Best Film, Best Actress, University Award.

System Crasher won eight German Film Awards in 2020: Best Fiction Feature Film (Peter Hartwig, Jonas Weydemann, Jakob D. Weydemann), Best Director and Best Screenplay (Nora Fingscheidt), Best Actress (Helena Zengel), Best actor (Albrecht Schuch), Best Supporting Actress (Gabriela Maria Schmeide), Best Editing (Stephan Bechinger & Julia Kovalenko), Best Sound Design (Corinna Zink, Jonathan Schorr, Dominik Leube, Oscar Stiebitz, Gregor Bonse).

== Remake ==
In February 2022, Metro-Goldwyn-Mayer acquired remake rights to the film, with Channing Tatum attached to star and produce.

== See also ==
- List of submissions to the 92nd Academy Awards for Best International Feature Film
- List of German submissions for the Academy Award for Best International Feature Film
