= Dear Thomas =

2021 film

- Directed by: Andreas Kleinert
- Starring: Albrecht Schuch
- Release date: 2 July 2021 (MIFF)
- Running time: 150 minutes
- Country: Germany
- Language: German

Dear Thomas (German: Lieber Thomas) is a 2021 German biographical film directed by Andreas Kleinert. It is based on the life of German author, poet and film director Thomas Brasch.

== Cast ==
- Albrecht Schuch - Thomas Brasch
- Peter Kremer - Thomas Brasch (age 56)
- Anja Schneider - Gerda Brasch
- Jella Haase - Katharina Thalbach
- Ioana Iacob - Sanda Weigl
- Jörg Schüttauf - Horst Brasch
