= Lea van Acken =

German actress (born 1999)

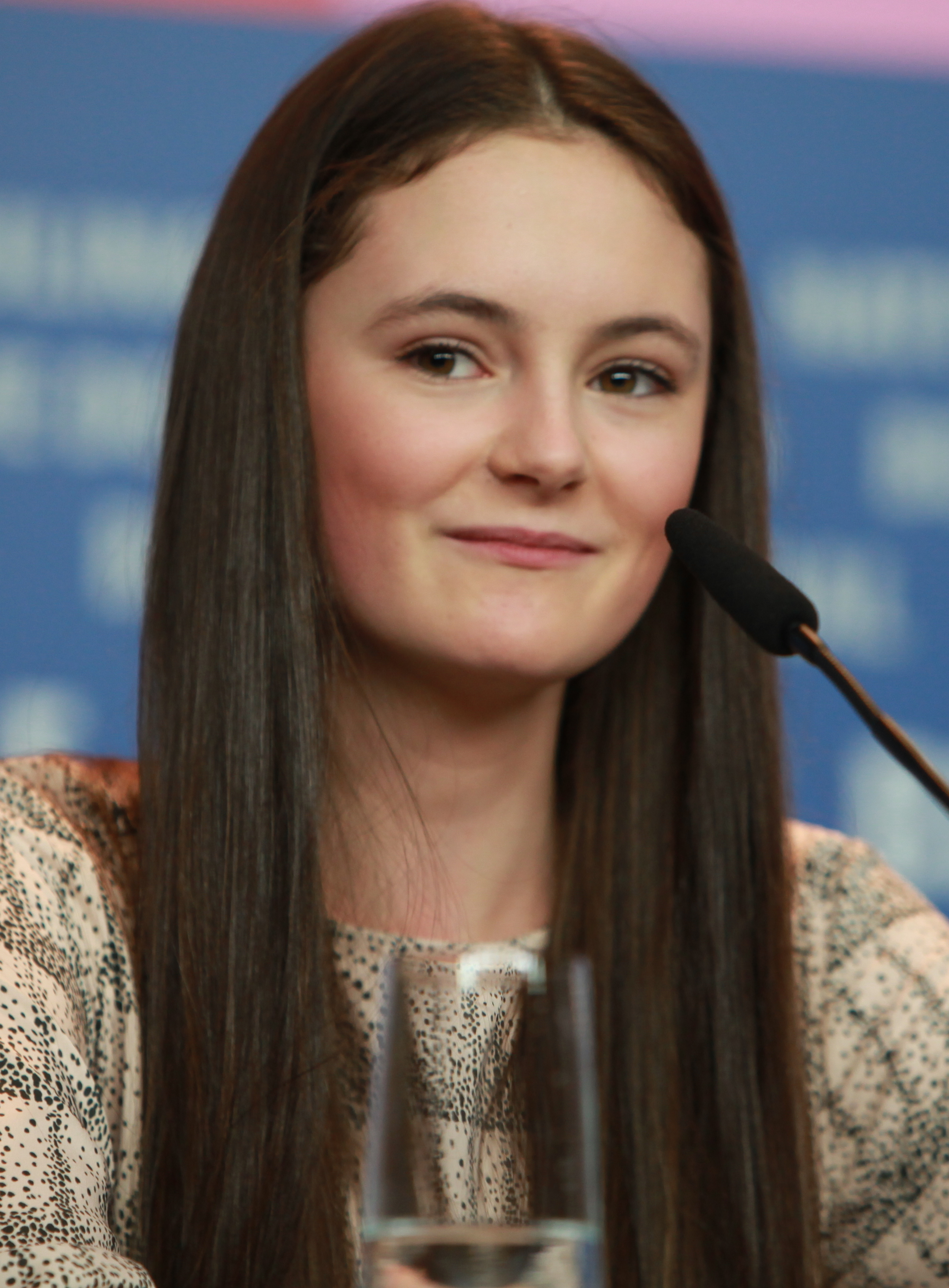
- Lea van Acken at the Berlin Film Festival in February 2014
- Born: 20 February 1999 (age 27); Lübeck, Schleswig-Holstein, Germany
- Occupation: Actress
- Years active: 2011–present

Lea van Acken (born 20 February 1999) is a German actress.

== Career ==
Lea van Acken had her first appearance on stage at the Karl May Festival in Bad Segeberg in 2011. She was the leading actress in the 2014 drama film Stations of the Cross directed by Dietrich Brüggemann. In this film, which was awarded with a Silver Bear at the 64th Berlin International Film Festival, she played a Catholic girl in a religiously fanatic family. One year later, she played a minor role in the fifth season of the series Homeland, which was set in Germany. She played Holocaust victim Anne Frank in the 2016 German production Das Tagebuch der Anne Frank. Van Acken also appears in the German Netflix series Dark as Silja Tiedemann.

== Filmography ==
Film
Year	Title	Role	Notes	Ref.
2014	Stations of the Cross	Maria		
2015	Heil	Teenager		
2016	Das Tagebuch der Anne Frank	Anne Frank		
2016	Sag mir nichts	Susanna	TV movie	
2016	Spreewaldkrimi - Spiel mit dem Tod	Svenja Heinze	TV movie	
2017	Bibi & Tina: Perfect Pandemonium	Adea/Alladin		
2017	Stormwind 3	Sam		
2017	Fack ju Göhte 3	Amrei		
2018	Slender Man	Michelle		
2019	Abikalypse	Hannah		
2022	Das Privileg	Lena		

Television
Year	Title	Role	Notes	Ref.
2015	Homeland	Ayla	Episode: "The Tradition of Hospitality"	
2017–2019	Dark	Silja Tiedemann	8 episodes	
2020	Sløborn	Ella	7 episodes	
