= Anna Letenská =

Czech actress (1904–1942)

Anna Čalounová-Letenská
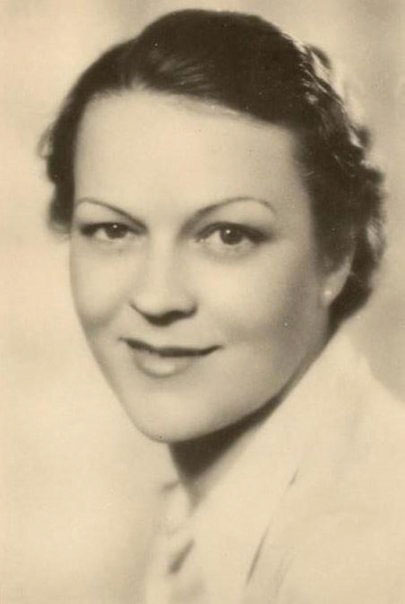
- Born: Anna Svobodová; 29 August 1904; Nýřany, Austria-Hungary
- Died: 24 October 1942 (aged 38); Mauthausen, Nazi Germany
- Occupation: Actress
- Years active: 1937–1942

Anna Čalounová-Letenská (née Anna Svobodová) (29 August 1904 – 24 October 1942) was a Czech theatre and film actress. During the 1930s and 40s, she appeared in twenty-five films. She was murdered in the Nazi concentration camp of Mauthausen.

== Biography ==
=== Early career ===
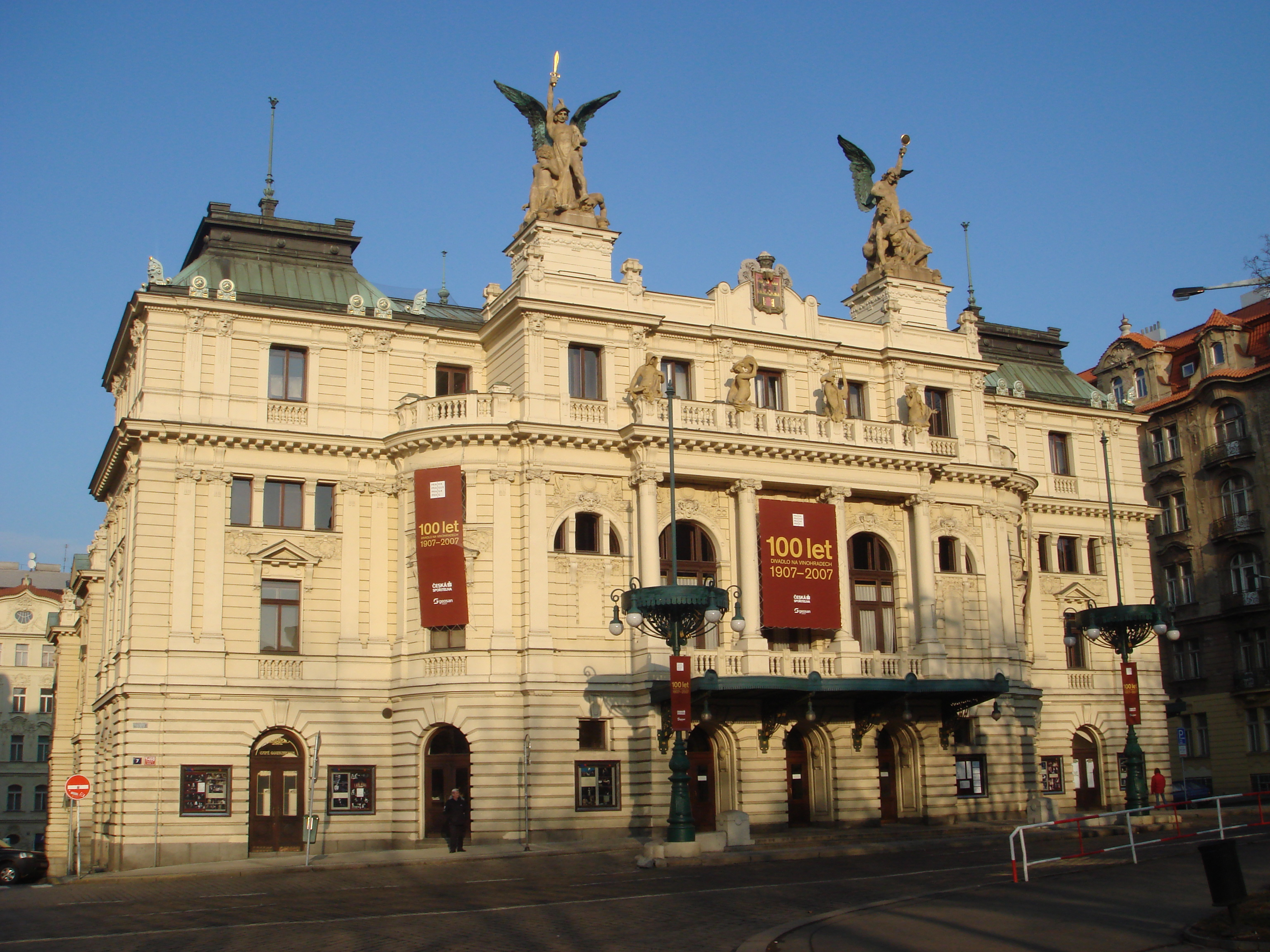
From 1939 to 1942, Letenská worked at the Vinohrady Theatre, Prague.

Anna Letenská was born in Nýřany, Plzeň Region, Austro-Hungarian Monarchy. She was brought up in a theatrical environment - both of her parents, Marie Svobodová (1871–1960) and Oldřich Svoboda (died 1939), and her sister, Růžena Nováková (1899–1984), were actors. She made her first appearance on stage at an early age.

Letenská began her professional stage career in 1919 as a member of the Suková-Kramulová theatre company and went on to work with theatre companies in České Budějovice (1920–29), Olomouc (1930–31), Bratislava (1931–35), and Kladno (1935–36). While working with the theatre company of Otto Alfredi she met and befriended the operetta actor Ludvík Hrdlička, who performed under the stage name "Letenský". They wed in January 1925 and the following year had a son, Jiří (who later himself worked as an actor and radio speaker). However, the marriage was not a happy one and they divorced in 1940. They had previously moved to Prague in 1936 where after a series of short-term engagements Letenská found employment with the Vinohrady Theatre (1939–42). She performed in Czech and world theatre repertoire and was known for her comic performances in the role of down-to-earth, energetic women characters.

Letenská's film debut was in Kříž u potoka (1937). In her next film, Manželka něco tuší (1938), she appeared alongside her husband. She was able to exploit her talent for comedy in the film Milování zakázáno, which is regarded as the starting-point of her successful film career. Her career in the cinema was more varied than her theatre career, with appearances in minor and major roles as maidservants, concierges, aunties, wives and mothers. However it was a short one, lasting only from 1937 to 1942. This was the period of the German occupation of Czechoslovakia and the start of World War II in Europe.

== World War II ==
On 27 May 1942, in an action known as Operation Anthropoid, two Czechoslovak parachutists, Jozef Gabčík and Jan Kubiš, ambushed and fatally wounded Reinhard Heydrich, Deputy Reich-Protector of the Protectorate of Bohemia and Moravia, while he was being driven through the Prague suburb of Libeň. The Nazis embarked on a large-scale operation to find and capture the assassins. They searched the whole of Bohemia and Moravia, investigating over 4,750,000 inhabitants and combing 60 large forest areas. One of the assassins, Kubiš, had been wounded in the face by a fragment of the bomb thrown at Heydrich's car. He escaped and was helped by MUDr. Břetislav Lyčka, who lived in the Karlín district of Prague. After Karel Čurda's betrayal of his Resistance colleagues and friends, Lyčka and his wife Františka Lyčková were forced to split up and find separate places to hide.

At the time Letenská was working on the film Přijdu hned, directed by Otakar Vávra. In 1941, she had married the architect Vladislav Čaloun. Prior to the German occupation of Czechoslovakia, Čaloun had been involved in helping people persecuted by Hlinka's Slovak People's Party. His activities came to the notice of the party's extremist supporters and he was expelled from Slovakia in 1939. In Prague, Čaloun continued working to help people threatened by the Nazi régime leave the country. He and his new wife became friends with the Lyčkas. Both Čaloun and Dr. Lyčka were members of the illegal organisation called Jindra and were closely connected with the group helping Heydrich's assassins. According to the original version of events, Letenská gave shelter to Františka Lyčková. However, according to the subsequent account given by the Czech actor Svatopluk Beneš, Letenská told him a different version of the story. She had gone to a wine bar with her second husband where they met a man who introduced himself as a friend of Čaloun's brother and asked if they could give him a bed for one night. According to Beneš, the man was apparently Doctor Lyčka.

Despite being helped by Letenská and her husband, Lyčková was soon arrested by the Gestapo. After being tortured, she revealed the secret identity and whereabouts of her husband. Lyčka committed suicide in a cellar in Ouběnice, shortly before his arrest. Letenská came under suspicion of helping the assassins. Surprisingly, only her husband was arrested and Letenská was allowed to remain at large, purportedly because she was one of the stars of the still unfinished movie Přijdu hned. Miloš Havel (uncle of the former Czech President Václav Havel), an influential producer at the Barrandov Studios, is said to have intervened to prevent her arrest so that the film could be completed. Havel was the owner of Lucernafilm, producers of the film.

Letenská remained under Gestapo surveillance while filming continued. According to Otakar Vávra, the film's director, "throughout this time Anna Letenská would sit with her head held between her hands although she appeared as cheerful as could be in front of the camera. We understood that she was preparing herself to die."

== Imprisonment and death ==
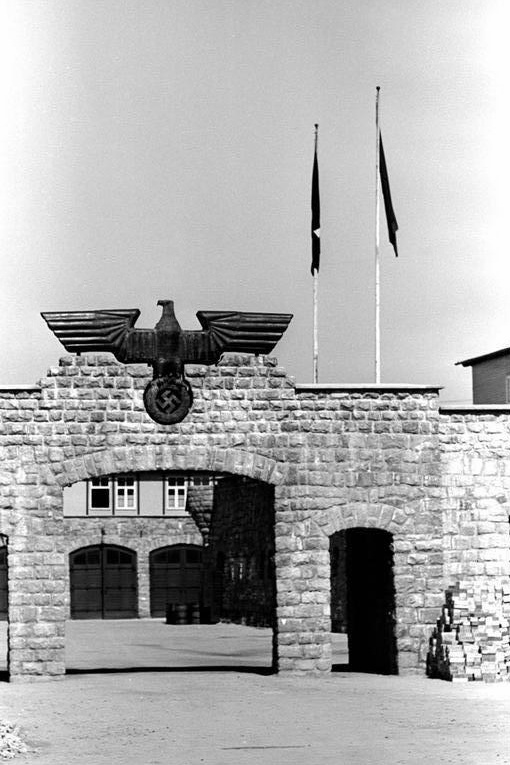
Mauthausen-Gusen concentration camp.

Once production of the film had been completed, Letenská was arrested and imprisoned. Accounts of her last days in Prague differ. Her colleague, the actor Antonín Strnad, said that Letenská was arrested and then shortly after that she was released very briefly, only so that she could terminate her contract of employment at the Vinohrady Theatre. Strnad met her in the theatre, in tears. Another actor, František Filipovský, claimed that he was probably the last person who talked to her. He met her in a tram at Wenceslas Square and asked: "Where are you going, Anka?" She replied: "Ah, they summoned me to an interrogation at Gestapo, again. What could they ask me?" Then she got out of the tram and vanished into the crowd. "I never saw her again", Filipovský said. The final version tells how Letenská was arrested by the German interrogator Heinz Jantur on 3 September 1942. She dropped a little talisman as she was getting into a Gestapo car. It was a picture of a Czech landscape. The German officers allowed her to pick it up; Letenská kissed the picture, and got into the car. According to Strnad, she gave the talisman to her cellmates shortly before her execution. She asked them, if they survived, to give it to the actors at the theatre. One of the camp inmates is said to have brought the picture to the theatre after the war.

Letenská was briefly imprisoned in Pankrác Prison before being taken to Theresienstadt concentration camp on 5 October 1942. On 23 October, she was transported to Mauthausen along with a group of 135 women and girls referred to as "the parachutists" (they were relatives of Heydrich's assassins or otherwise linked to the assassination). On arrival in the camp they were taken to the camp bathrooms where they were turned over to the privileged criminal inmates for their amusement. The next day they were taken to a "consulting room" in the camp for a medical examination. The consulting room, located in a building referred to as "the bunker", was in fact an execution chamber (in German: Genickschuss) masquerading as a medical facility. The women were brought to the room one by one for their supposed examination and then shot there at two-minute intervals. Anna Letenská was shot in the head in the bunker at 10:56 on 24 October 1942. Her name and the date of her execution were carefully recorded by German officials. Letenská's husband Vladislav Čaloun was shot on 26 January 1943, at 16:45.

The film was premiered two months after her death.

The novel Kat nepočká (The Hangman Won't Wait, 1958) by Norbert Frýd was inspired by Anna Letenská's life story. A film adaptation of the novel was made in 1971 starring Jiřina Bohdalová. A street in the Vinohrady district of Prague is named after Anna Letenská.

== Selected theatre roles ==
- 1937 - Guest performance in the play Těžká Barbora, Osvobozené divadlo (V+W), directed by Jindřich Honzl
- 1939 - Heinrich von Kleist: The Broken Jug, Frau Marthe, Vinohrady Theatre, directed by František Salzer
- 1939 - William Shakespeare: The Merry Wives of Windsor, Vinohrady Theatre, directed by Bohuš Stejskal
- 1939 - A. Pacovská: Chudí lidé vaří z vody, Marie, Vinohrady Theatre, directed by Jiří Plachý
- 1940 - Josef Kajetán Tyl: Strakonický dudák, Kordula, Vinohrady Theatre, directed by Gabriel Hart
- 1940 - K. R. Krpata: Mistr ostrého meče, Katovka-Rosina, Vinohrady Theatre, directed by František Salzer
- 1940 - Gerhart Hauptmann: The Beaver Coat, Mother Wolff, Vinohrady Theatre, directed by František Salzer
- 1941 - Alexander Ostrovsky: The Storm, Varvara, Vinohrady Theatre, directed by František Salzer
- 1941 - A. Pacovská: Vdovin groš, Pelikánová, Vinohradské divadlo, Vinohrady Theatre, directed by Jiří Plachý
- 1941 - Lila Bubelová: Slečna Pusta, Marie Poustecká, Chamber Theater, directed by Antonín Kandert
- 1941 - Aristophanes: Ecclesiazusae, Praxagora, Theatre Na poříčí, directed by Jiří Plachý

== Films ==
- 2009 - Fred Breinersdorfer: Andula, Besuch in einem anderen Leben', documentary, movie, 2009, director: Fred Breinersdorfer, with Hannah Herzsprung, WDR, RBB, arte
- 2009 - Fred Breinersdorfer Spiel ums Leben, TV-documentary, 2009, WDR, RBB, arte

== Selected film roles ==
- 1937 - Kříž u potoka, housemaid, directed by Miloslav Jareš
- 1938 - Milování zakázáno, directed by Miroslav Cikán, Karel Lamač
- 1938 - Slávko nedej se!
- 1939 - Mořská panna, directed by Václav Kubásek
- 1939 - Ženy u benzinu
- 1940 - Babička, directed by František Čáp
- 1940 - Minulost Jany Kosinové, directed by Jan Alfréd Holman
- 1940 - Čekanky, directed by Vladimír Borský
- 1941 - Pražský flamendr, directed by Karel Špelina
- 1941 - Z českých mlýnů, directed by Miroslav Cikán
- 1942 - Valentin Dobrotivý, directed by Martin Frič
- 1942 - Ryba na suchu, directed by Vladimír Slavínský
- 1942 - Městečko na dlani, directed by Václav Binovec
- 1942 - Přijdu hned, directed by Otakar Vávra
