= Jacob Matschenz =

German actor

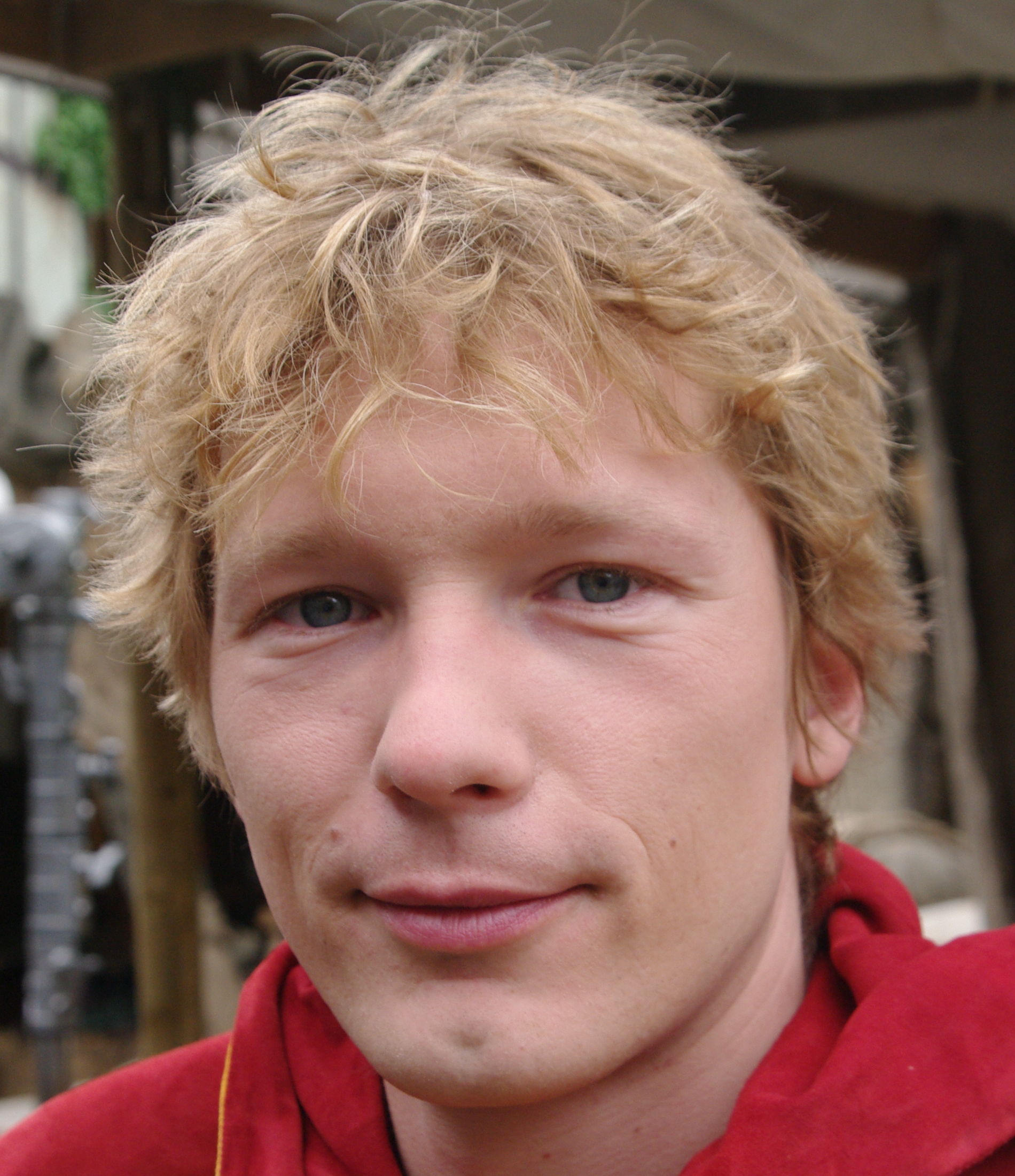
Jacob Matschenz (2014)

Jacob Matschenz (born 1984, East Berlin, East Germany) is a German actor. He is notable for film and television work including The Wave (2008), 12 Paces Without a Head (2009) and The Sinking of the Laconia (2010). He won the Adolf Grimme Award in 2008 for his appearance in An die Grenze.

== Filmography ==
=== Film ===
Year	Film	Role	Other notes
2001	Circling	Niki	
2002	Mutants	Jens	
2003	Liberated Zone	Benny Kubicek	
2004	Inside I'm Dancing	Declan	
2004	Fliehendes Land	Pierre	
2005	Rose	Stan	
2005	Smile of the Monsterfish	Malte	
2006	Ludgers Fall	Peter	director Wolf Wolff
2006	Neandertal	Guido	
2006	Wholetrain	Achim	
2007	42plus	Tamaz	
2008	A Year Ago in Winter	Tobias Hollander	
2008	Coxless Pair	Ludwig	
2008	Innocence	Matte	
2008	1st of May: All Belongs to You	Jacob	
2008	The Wave	Dennis	
2009	12 Paces Without a Head	Nolle	
2009	The Crocodiles	Dennis	
2009	Fly	Dima	(Short)
2010	Kalte Karibik	Peter	
2010	Run If You Can	Christian	aka Renn, wenn du kannst
2010	Stronger Than Blood	Tommy	aka Bis aufs Blut – Brüder auf Bewährung
2011	Vicky and the Treasure of the Gods	Kerkerwächter 1	
2011	Men in the City 2	Helge	aka Männerherzen… und die ganz ganz große Liebe
2011	Adam's End	Marcel	
2011	The Crocodiles: All for One	Dennis	
2011	The System	Mike Hiller	debut feature film by director Marc Bauder
2012	Move	Philipp	
2012	Guardians	Toni Santer	
2012	Mission: Sputnik	Onkel Mike	Director Markus Dietrich
2013	Grossstadtklein	Ole	
2013	Break Up Man	Steffen	
2014	Jack	Philipp	directed by Edward Berger
2015	Heil	Johnny	
2015	3 Türken & ein Baby	Kaspar	
2016	Rico, Oskar and the Mysterious Stone	Tom	
2016	Alone in Berlin	Dietrich Necker	
2017	Forwards Ever!	August	
2017	Magical Mystery or: The Return of Karl Schmidt	Holger	
2017	Tomorrow we'll be happy	Leon	(Short)
2017	My Blind Date with Life	Max	
2018	Never Look Away	Arendt Ivo	
2018	The Famous Five and the Valley of Dinosaurs	Marty Bach	
2019	Coke Champagne & Cigarettes	Martin	(in post-production)
Year	Television series	Role	Other notes
2002	Juls Freundin	Jul Rosenberg	(TV movie)
2002	Polizeiruf 110		TV series, 1 episode
2003	Sex Up	Adam 'Häschen' Hoppeczynski	(TV movie)
2004	Experiment Bootcamp	Jens	(TV movie)
2004-2018	Tatort	Michael Voss (2004)/Andi Schwab (2006)/Sascha (2014)/Bernd Hermann (2017)/Polizist (2018)	TV series, 5 episodes
2005	Sex Up Your Life!	Adam 'Häschen' Hoppeczynski	(TV movie)
2006	Zwei Engel für Amor	Dirk Krahn	TV series, 2 episodes
2006	F4: Vortex	Michael	(TV movie)
2006	Tollpension	ZDL Dominik Rösner	(TV movie)
2007	Stubbe – Von Fall zu Fall	Jacob Fahrenson	TV series, 1 episode
2007	Auf dem Vulkan	Joshi Jung	(TV movie)
2007	An die Grenze	Alexander Karow	(TV movie)
2008	Leipzig Homicide	David Balthus	TV series, 1 episode
2008	Death in the Eifel	Tim Wenning	(TV movie)
2009	Der gestiefelte Kater	Müller Hans	(TV movie)
2009	Cologne P.D.	Jakob Schmidt	TV series, 1 episode
2011	Dreileben	Johannes	TV mini-series, 3 episodes
2011	The Sinking of the Laconia	Oberleutnant zur See Gert Mannesmann, 1st watch officer, U-156	two-part television film
2011	Calm at Sea	Heinrich	(TV movie), aka La Mer à l'aube
2012	Finn und der Weg zum Himmel	Finn Mulzer	(TV movie)
2012	Bella Block	Lenny Gravert	TV series, 1 episode
2014	Till Eulenspiegel	Till Eulenspiegel	(TV movie)
2014	Die Pilgerin	Sebastian Laux	two-part television film
2015	High Society Murder	Oliver Kaspari	TV series, 1 episode
2015	Nachspielzeit	Marc	(TV movie)
2017	Babylon Berlin	Fritz	TV series, 7 episodes
2017	Abgestempelt	Max	TV series, 1 episode
2019	Toni, männlich, Hebamme	Flocke	TV series, 1 episode
2019	Charité	Martin Schelling	TV series, 6 episodes
2019	Der Koch ist tot	Pascal Kemper	(TV movie)
2020	Unterleuten: The Torn Village		TV mini-series
