= Move (2012 film) =

- Film poster
- German: Drei Zimmer/Küche/Bad
- Directed by: Dietrich Brüggemann
- Starring: Jacob Matschenz; Robert Gwisdek
- Release date: 1 July 2012 (MFF)
- Running time: 1h 58min
- Country: Germany
- Language: German

Move (German: Drei Zimmer / Küche / Bad; lit. 'Three Rooms / Kitchen / Bath') is a 2012 German comedy film directed by Dietrich Brüggemann.

The film revolves around eight friends in Berlin in their late twenties who try to find a perspective on their lives during constant moves between flat-shares and small part-time jobs. The focus is on siblings Philipp, Wiebke and Swantje. Philipp wants to be a photographer and has been in love with Dina for a long time, but she only sees him as a good friend. Dina shares a flat with Wiebke, who after endless internships finally lands a real job. Wiebke has her eye on Michael, who, however, only wants a "friendship-based" relationship. Philip's best friend Thomas does everything in his power to pursue a career as a graphic designer, and as a result he increasingly neglects his relationship with Jessica. Then there is Maria, who still lives in Freiburg, but is just waiting to finally move in with Philipp in Berlin. Meanwhile, Swantje lives in Stuttgart and maintains contact with the "metropolis" Berlin, mainly by phone.

== Cast ==
- Jacob Matschenz as Philipp
- Robert Gwisdek as Thomas
- Anna Brüggemann as Dina
- Alice Dwyer as Jessica
- Katharina Spiering as Wiebke
- Aylin Tezel as Maria
- Alexander Khuon as Michael
- Amelie Kiefer as Swantje
- Corinna Harfouch as Mutter
- Hans-Heinrich Hardt as Vater
- Leslie Malton as Mutter Dina
- Herbert Knaup as Vater Dina
