= Das Tagebuch der Anne Frank =

- Promotional poster
- Directed by: Hans Steinbichler
- Written by: Fred Breinersdorfer
- Based on: The Diary of a Young Girl by Anne Frank
- Produced by: Walid Nakschbandi; Michael Souvignier
- Starring: Lea van Acken; Martina Gedeck; Ulrich Noethen; Stella Kunkat
- Cinematography: Bella Halben
- Edited by: Wolfgang Weigl
- Music by: Sebastian Pille
- Production companies: Zeitsapung Pictures; AVE
- Distributed by: Universal Pictures International
- Release dates: February 16, 2016 (Berlinale); March 3, 2016 (Germany)
- Running time: 128 minutes
- Country: Germany
- Language: German
- Box office: $3.1 million

Das Tagebuch der Anne Frank (English: The Diary of Anne Frank) is a 2016 German drama film directed by German filmmaker Hans Steinbichler and written by Fred Breinersdorfer. It stars Lea van Acken as the titular character, Martina Gedeck, Ulrich Noethen, and Stella Kunkat. The film is based on Anne Frank's famous diary and tells the story of Anne Frank, the Jewish girl who went into hiding with her family in Amsterdam and became a victim of the Holocaust.

The world premiere was held at February 16, 2016 in a special presentation for young people during the 66th Berlin International Film Festival. It was listed as one of eight films that could be the German submission for the Best Foreign Language Film at the 89th Academy Awards, but it was not selected. The film was theatrically released in Germany on March 3, 2016, by Universal Pictures International. It received largely positive reviews from critics, with many praising van Acken's performance as Anne Frank, and grossed over $31 million.

== Plot ==
During the World War II, in the 1930s to 1940s, Anne Frank (Lea van Acken) gets a diary as a present for her 13th birthday. When the Nazis occupy the Netherlands, she goes into hiding with her family and other Jews in Amsterdam. During that time she writes down all her thoughts about the situation in her diary. Later the Jews are betrayed and brought to concentration camps.

== Cast ==
- Lea van Acken as Anne Frank
- Martina Gedeck as Edith Frank-Holländer
- Ulrich Noethen as Otto Heinrich Frank
- Stella Kunkat as Margot Frank
- Ella Frey as Anne Frank as Child
- Margarita Broich as Petronella van Daan
- André Jung as Hans van Daan
- Leonard Carow as Peter van Daan
- Arthur Klemt as Dr. Albert Dussel
- Gerti Drassl as Miep Gies
- Stefan Merki as Victor Kugler
- Marcus Widmann as Johannes Kleiman
- Konstanze Fischer as Bep Voskuijl
- Maximilian Löwenstein as Jan Gies
- Jamie Bick as Hanneli Goslar
- Stephan Schad as Hans Goslar
- Michael A. Grimm as Willem van Maaren
- Michael Kranz as Lammert Hartog
- Florian Teichtmeister as Karl Josef Silberbauer
- Dirk Ossig as Hendrik van Hoeve
- Mareile Blendl as Frau van Hoeve
- Patrick Joswig as Der Holländer
- Barbara Melzl as Olga Spitzer

== Production ==
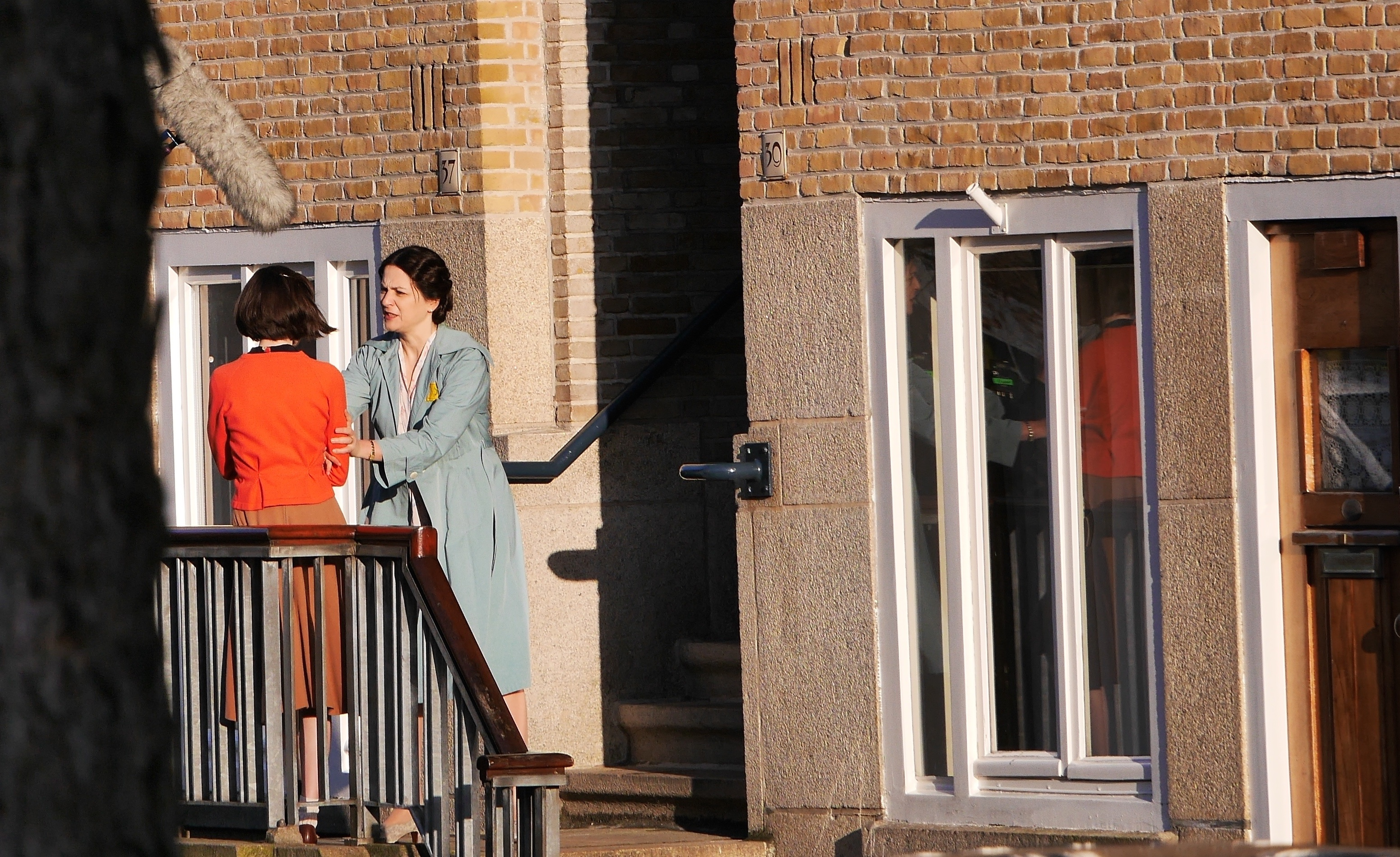
shooting with Lea van Acken and Martina Gedeck in Amsterdam

The filming began on January 26, 2015, in Cologne. Further work was done until March 2015 in Bavaria, Berlin and Brandenburg. Some scenes were shot on original locations in Amsterdam, for example the Merwedeplein, where the Frank family lived before they went into hiding. The exterior shots of the Prinsengracht 263 were produced in the nearby Leidsegracht. The original Anne Frank House could not be used for this purpose because its look has changed since the 1940s.

The producers Michael Souvignier and Walid Nakschbandi acquired the worldwide and exclusive rights for films about Anne Frank's diary. They produced the film in cooperation with Universal Pictures. The work was supported by the Anne Frank Foundation, so the producers could use the whole archive.

The director Hans Steinbichler regards this film as a production for the younger generation. He said he wanted to make the story completely subjective and to transform the written texts of the diary into speech.

It was listed as one of eight films that could be the German submission for the Best Foreign Language Film at the 89th Academy Awards.

== Release ==
The world premiere was held at February 16, 2016 in a special presentation for young people during the 66th Berlin International Film Festival.
