= Norbert Frýd =

Czech writer, journalist and diplomat

Norbert Frýd

Norbert Frýd (born Norbert Fried) (21 April 1913 – 18 March 1976) was a Czech writer, journalist and diplomat. He is known mainly for his autobiographical novel Krabice živých (A Box of Lives, 1956), in which he describes his experiences in Nazi concentration camps. During World War II, he was imprisoned in the Theresienstadt, Auschwitz and Dachau-Kaufering concentration camps.

== Biography ==
Norbert Fried was born in České Budějovice to a family of Jewish merchants. His father was a Czech Jew and his mother came from a German Jewish family. He studied at the German gymnasium in his home town, graduating in 1932. He went on to study the Faculty of Law of the Charles University in Prague. After graduating in 1937 he studied for a doctorate in modern literature at the Faculty of Arts and Philosophy. He submitted his thesis on "The Origins of Czech Surrealism" in 1939 but was not awarded his PhD until 1945. In the mid-1930s, he became involved with the "Leftist Front" cultural and political movement in Prague. He was a close collaborator with Emil František Burian, and became friends with various Jewish artists, such as Hanuš Bonn, Robert Guttmannn, Jindřich Heisler, Jiří Orten and Josef Taussig. It was while working at Burian's theatre that his collaborative partnership with the composer Karel Reiner began. Together, they created the farce Mistr Pleticha, based on the French original, Maître Patelin. Reiner composed the music and Frýd wrote the lyrics. In 1936 he began working as a lyricist, editor and script-writer for Metro–Goldwyn–Mayer and RKO Radiofilm. In 1939, when Jews were excluded from public employment, he was forced to work as a manual laborer not allowed to work for anyone outside Prague's Jewish community.

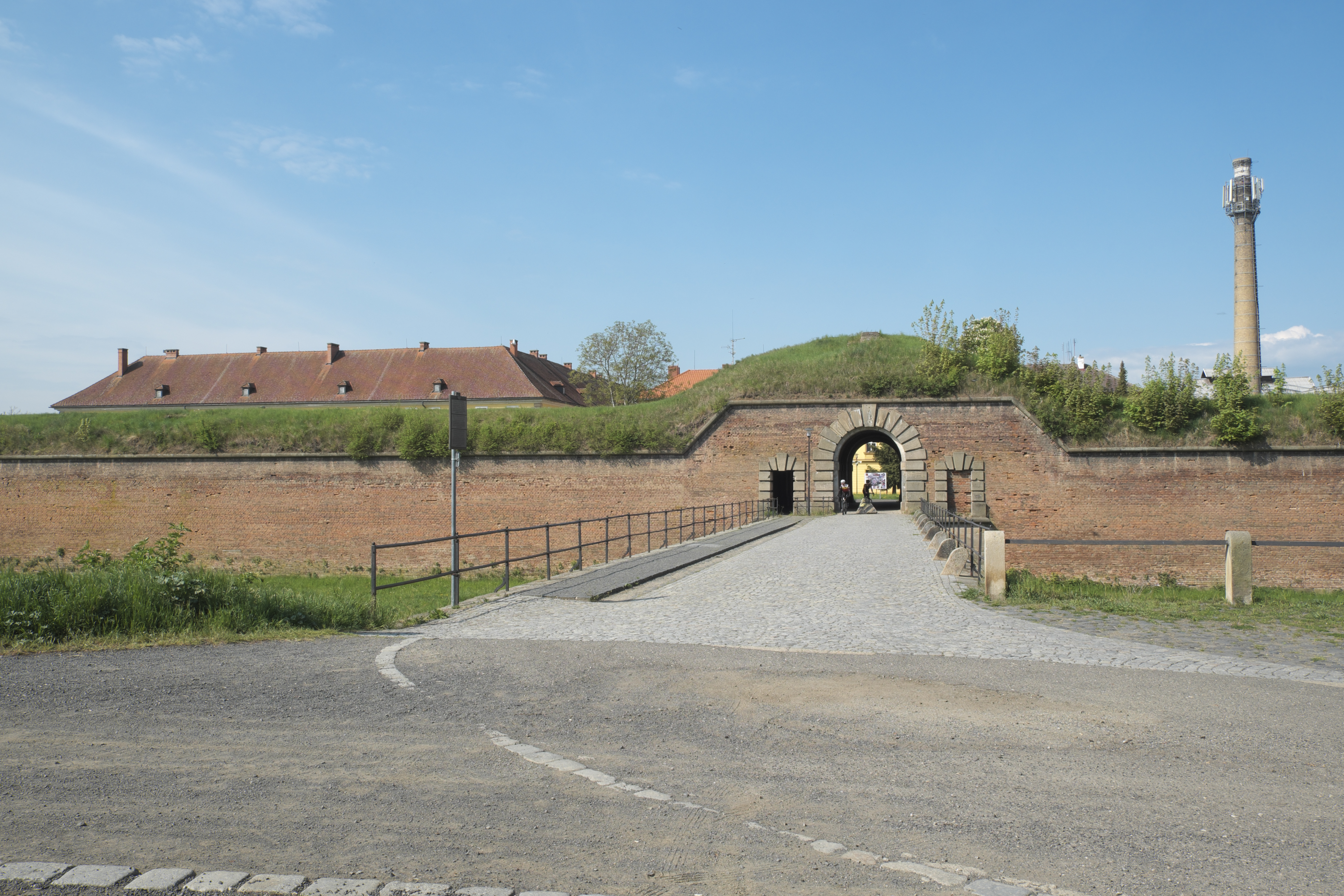
Theresienstadt ghetto, where Norbert Frýd spent almost two years.

In November 1942, Frýd was imprisoned in the ghetto at Theresienstadt, where he became involved in the clandestine cultural life of the community. He wrote a collection of nursery rhymes, Abeceda květovaného koně, which later he and Karel Reiner rearranged into a set of children's songs and choruses that were successfully performed in the ghetto. He also directed the play Esther (with music by Reiner). In Autumn 1944, he was transported to Auschwitz concentration camp, along with all the other artists imprisoned in Theresienstadt. (Note: In September/October 1944, the Nazis sent the inmates from Theresienstadt to Auschwitz in 11 transports. Of 18,402 prisoners, only 1574 survived and saw the end of the war. Norbert Frýd was deported to Auschwitz in the first transport, on 28 September 1944.) At Auschwitz, he spent several nights sitting (together with thousands of other people) on a concrete floor in block "E2", located on the site of the former Roma camp. Subsequently, he was transferred to Dachau-Kaufering. "I was in Dachau-Kaufering at the end of 1944", he later remembered, "when the boys from all over Europe – French, Dutch, Germans, Poles, Yugoslavs, Greeks, we Czechs and I don't know who else – began to sing The Internationale in their mother languages, all together. It was a sound like I'd never heard before." In April 1945, as the SS were starting to evacuate the camps, he managed to escape. Frýd's father, brother and wife died in the concentration camps and he appears to have been the only member of his family to survive the Holocaust. During the immediate postwar period, he helped the Americans as an interpreter during the interrogation of the Dachau SS guards. He returned to Prague on 22 May 1945, together with his friend Karel Reiner.

After the war, he worked as a journalist and an official of the Czechoslovak Communist Party. In 1946, he changed his name to Frýd. A year later, in 1947, he became a cultural diplomatic attaché in Mexico and subsequently served in various diplomatic posts in Latin America and the U.S. After a brief period of employment with Czechoslovak Radio from 1951–1953, he embarked on a career as a freelance writer. His childhood friend, the writer Lenka Reinerová, recalled in an interview how he had helped her when she was arrested in 1952. She remembered him as being "the only person who protested against my arrest by the communist authorities. (Note: After the war, Reinerová spent 15 months in a communist prison.) You know, I remembered him as a cheerful guy who was always playing the guitar and singing. Then he was taken in a transport to the camps. He came back from Dachau, but he was a different person. No guitar, no singing. When I gave him my hand, I realized the terrible change. He had cold moist hands, as if you were touching a corpse. He suffered from depression and anxiety. He had to cope with terrible fear. And yet he wasn't scared and went to the communist Department of the Interior on my behalf", she said.

From 1951 until the early 1970s, he served as a delegate to UNESCO.

Frýd died in Prague in 1976.

== Style ==
Frýd published his first literary efforts in 1929 in the magazine Tramp. He wrote in both Czech and German. The main theme of his works was the fate of Czech Jews. In the novel Krabice živých, he attempted to provide a detailed psychological picture of concentration camp prisoners and their SS guards. He also produced short stories, news reports and travel books. During his career, he worked for the theatre, radio and television. Children's literature was another important part of his work. As well as children's books he also wrote scripts for children's films. He illustrated his books with photographs taken during his extensive travels.

== Krabice živých (A Box of Lives) ==
Frýd completed his most successful novel in 1956. The plot is set in the last months of 1944, in the fictional concentration camp of Gigling. The main character, the young intellectual Zdeněk Roubík, is an assistant in the camp office. One of his jobs is to maintain the card index of the inmates, hence the title of the novel, "A Box of Lives". In the camp, Roubík gradually manages to overcome the apathy and depression caused by the death of his brother and he becomes more actively involved in camp life. The author attempts to depict everyday life, social interactions and relationships in the camp, and the work and hardships of the inmates. The description of the SS guards in the camp is a focus of particular attention.

The novel includes autobiographical elements (like Roubík's brother in the novel, the author's brother Jan died in a concentration camp) and attempts to document life in the inhumane environment of a concentration camp. It offers philosophical insights while attempting to provide an objective picture of the camp's everyday reality. The author reflects on how to maintain human dignity and cope with evil in the extraordinary circumstances of the camp.

The novel was acclaimed by contemporary critics, and republished in numerous editions and translations.

== Works ==
=== Books ===
- Prag spricht dich an (1933) in German, under the name Norbert Fried
- Pusťte basu do rozhlasu (1937) fairytales, under the pseudonym Nora Fried; in 1972 published under the title Basa tvrdí muziku
- Don Juan jde do divadla (1942) under the pseudonym Emil Junek
- Bratr Jan (1945) under the pseudonym Nora Fried, written in memory of the author's brother Jan, murdered in a concentration camp
- Divná píseň (1946, 1940) banned
- Mexiko je v Americe (1952); in 1958, published under the title Mexické obrázky
- Případ majora Hogana, Druhá smrt Dicka Garzy (1952)
- Studna supů (1953)
- Havíř Gavlas (1953)
- Meč archandělů (1954)
- Usměvavá Guatemala (1955)
- Krabice živých (1956)
- Ztracená stuha (1957)
- Kat nepočká (1958) based on the life story of the actress Anna Letenská
- S pimprlaty do Kalkaty (1960)
- Živá socha (1961)
- Tři malé ženy (1963) short stories
- Pan Lučavka (1963)
- Sloup vody (1964)
- Prales (1965)
- Posledních sto let – a trilogy describing the assimilation of Czech Jews and their fates during the Holocaust
  - Vzorek bez ceny a pan biskup aneb Začátek posledních sto let (1966), Part 1
  - Hedvábné starosti aneb Uprostřed posledních sto let (1968) Part 2
  - Lahvová pošta aneb Konec posledních sto let (1971) Part 3
- Císařovna (1972)
- Almara plná povídaček (1973)
- Rukama nevinnosti (1974)
- Květovaný kůň (1975, children's book)
- Oživení v sále (1976)
- Tři nepatrní muži (1978) short stories

=== Scenic ===
- Noc kotrmelců (1962)

=== Other ===
- Mexická grafika (1955)

== English translations ==
- Frýd, Norbert: A Box of Lives. Prague: Artia, 1962

== Bibliography ==
- Menclová, Věra (2005). Vaněk, Václav (ed.). Slovník českých spisovatelů [Dictionary of Czech Writers] (in Czech). Prague: Libri. pp. 179–180. ISBN 80-7277-179-5.
- Kuna, Milan (2008). Dvakrát zrozený. Život a dílo Karla Reinera (in Czech). Prague: H+H. ISBN 978-80-7319-078-1.
- Kuna, Milan (1990). Hudba na hranici života (in Czech). Prague: Naše vojsko; Český svaz protifašistických bojovníků. ISBN 80-206-0069-8.
