= The Third Side of the River =

2014 film

- Directed by: Celina Murga
- Written by: Celina Murga; Gabriel Medina
- Starring: Alian Devetac
- Release date: 12 February 2014 (Berlin)
- Running time: 92 minutes
- Country: Argentina
- Language: Spanish

The Third Side of the River (Spanish: La tercera orilla) is a 2014 Argentine drama film directed by Celina Murga, with Martin Scorsese as an executive producer. The film had its premiere in the competition section of the 64th Berlin International Film Festival.

== Cast ==
- Alian Devetac
- Daniel Veronese
