= Jungle Child (film) =

2011 film

- Theatrical release poster
- Directed by: Roland Suso Richter
- Written by: Roland Suso Richter; Sabine Kuegler
- Starring: Stella Kunkat; Thomas Kretschmann; Nadja Uhl
- Cinematography: Holly Fink
- Production companies: UFA Cinema; Degeto Film
- Distributed by: Universal Pictures International
- Release date: 17 February 2011
- Running time: 158 minutes
- Country: Germany
- Language: German

Jungle Child (German: Dschungelkind) is a 2011 German drama film directed by Roland Suso Richter. The film is the screen adaptation of the autobiographical bestseller books by Sabine Kuegler which tells her experience living with a native tribe of Western Papua, Indonesia from 1979 to 1989.

== Plot ==
Klaus Kuegler is a linguist and travels with his wife Doris and his three children into the tropical rainforest of Western New Guinea, Indonesia in 1979 to explore the language of a newly discovered native tribe, the Fayu. The eight-year-old daughter Sabine quickly settles down. What the family does not know: they have arrived in the midst of a tribal feud whose battles they do not directly affect, but in which they are increasingly drawn into. The family does not find it easy at first to understand the reason for the hostilities, and it must realize that love, hate, life and death have different values in the foreign culture than in their own. So begins a process of rapprochement in which both sides have to learn from each other.

One day, when Sabine and her brother find the severely injured Auri and the family feeds him at home, they endanger everyone, as this action can decide on war and peace between the two tribes. Sabine and Auri immediately develop a special bond and deep friendship.

After several years, when the family travels to Germany for a holiday, the sixteen-year-old Sabine is confronted with a completely "foreign" world that is no longer hers. Their search for belonging and security ultimately becomes a search for themselves. Only after returning to the jungle does she know where her true home is.

== Cast ==
- Stella Kunkat as Sabine Kuegler - child
- Sina Tkotsch as Sabine Kuegler - youth
- Thomas Kretschmann as Klaus Kuegler, Sabine's father
- Nadja Uhl as Doris Kuegler, Sabine's mother
- Tom Hoßbach as Christian Kuegler - child
- Sven Gielnik as Christian Kuegler - youth
- Milena Tscharntke as Judith Kuegler - child
- Emmanuel Simeon as Auri - child
- Felix Tokwepota as Auri - youth
- Range'e Pati as Faisa
- Francesca Passingan as Ältere Faisa
- Christian Jahl as Lehrer Danau Bira
- David Kaumara as Gohu

== Literature ==
- Sabine Kuegler: Jungle Child . Droemer Knaur, Munich 2005, ISBN 3-426-27361-6 (7 weeks in 2005 in the No. 1 Spiegel bestseller list ); as Knaur paperback 78149, Munich 2008, ISBN 978-3-426-78149-4 .
- Doris Kuegler: Jungle Years - My Life with the Native Americans of West Papua . Gerth Media, Asslar 2011, ISBN 978-3-86591-585-6
