= Stella Kunkat =

German actress (born 1998)

- Born: 29 December 1998 (age 27); Germany
- Occupation: Actress
- Years active: 2007–present
- Height: 170 cm (5 ft 7 in)

Stella Kunkat (29 December 1998) is a German actress.

== Biography ==
Kunkat attended a Montessori school in Berlin-Mitte. She sang in the children's choir of the Komische Oper Berlin where she was discovered in 2005 when she took part in the play Madame Butterfly. At the age of eight, she played her first role in the film March of Millions as the daughter of the protagonist who was played by Maria Furtwängler. In 2009, she had the role of the young Romy Schneider in the TV film Romy. Two years later, Kunkat played the young Sabine Kuegler in Jungle Child. For that role, she was nominated as Leading Young Performer in an international feature film at the 33rd Young Artist Awards. In the German production Das Tagebuch der Anne Frank, a film about the Holocaust victim Anne Frank, who wrote the famous diary, Kunkat plays Anne's older sister Margot Frank.

== Filmography ==
- March of Millions (Die Flucht, 2007)
- Tatort – Der glückliche Tod (2008)
- Romy (2009) as young Romy Schneider
- Kinder des Sturms (2009)
- Tatort – Altlasten (2009)
- Die Zeit der Kraniche (2010)
- Jungle Child (2011) as young Sabine Kuegler
- The Last Ride (2012)
- Keine Zeit für Träume (2014)
- SOKO Wismar – Der Fall Königsberg (2015)
- Das Tagebuch der Anne Frank (2016), as Margot Frank
