= Run If You Can =

2010 film

- Film poster
- German: Renn, wenn du kannst
- Directed by: Dietrich Brüggemann
- Starring: Robert Gwisdek; Jacob Matschenz
- Release date: 12 February 2010 (BIFF)
- Running time: 112 minutes
- Country: Germany
- Language: German

Run If You Can (German: Renn, wenn du kannst) is a 2010 German drama film directed by Dietrich Brüggemann.

== Plot ==
Benjamin, a comparative literature student, lives in a high-rise apartment in Duisburg. Christian, an aspiring medical student, is hired as Benjamin's new personal assistant and on his way to work is almost knocked down by Annika, a cellist, who cycles through a red light. The three begin to spend time with each other and a love triangle of sorts ensues.

== Cast ==
- Robert Gwisdek as Ben
- Jacob Matschenz as Christian
- Anna Brüggemann as Annika
- Daniel Drewes as Arzt
- Amelie Kiefer as Lisa
- Franziska Weisz as Mareike
