= Berlin by the Sea =

- Theatrical release poster
- Directed by: Wolfgang Eißler
- Written by: Wolfgang Eißler
- Produced by: Ali Saghri; Iris Sommerlatte
- Starring: Robert Stadlober; Anna Brüggemann; Axel Schreiber; Jana Pallaske; Claudius Franz
- Cinematography: Florian Schilling
- Edited by: Anna Kappelmann
- Music by: Eike Hosenfeld; Moritz Denis
- Production companies: AlinFilmproduktion; Red Cloud Filmproduction
- Distributed by: Warner Bros. Pictures
- Release date: 10 January 2008
- Running time: 98 minutes
- Country: Germany
- Language: German
- Box office: $206,965

Berlin by the Sea (German: Berlin am Meer) is a 2008 German romantic drama film written and directed by Wolfgang Eißler, starring Robert Stadlober and Anna Brüggemann in the lead roles.

== Plot ==
Tom and Malta who their whole life dream only to make it big in the electronic music industry. Together they rule Berlin's nightlife and imagine their future achieving their dream. Their lives are turned upside down by the arrival of a friend's little sister for who both develop feelings.

== Cast ==
- Robert Stadlober as Tom
- Anna Brüggemann as Mavie
- Axel Schreiber as Malte
- Jana Pallaske as Margrete
- Claudius Franz as Mitsch
- Emma Daubas as Angie
- Richard Kropf as Ralph
- Daniel Zillmann as Turbo
- Aaron Hildebrand as Peter
- Kida Khodr Ramadan as Cem
