= Macondo (film) =

2014 film

- Directed by: Sudabeh Mortezai
- Starring: Aslan Elbiev
- Release date: 14 February 2014 (Berlin)
- Country: Austria
- Language: German

Macondo is a 2014 Austrian drama film directed by Sudabeh Mortezai. The film had its premiere in the competition section of the 64th Berlin International Film Festival.

== Cast ==
- Aslan Elbiev
- Kheda Gazieva
- Ramasan Minkailov
