= Stations of the Cross (film) =

2014 film

- Film poster
- Directed by: Dietrich Brüggemann
- Written by: Dietrich Brüggemann; Anna Brüggemann
- Starring: Lea van Acken; Franziska Weisz
- Release dates: 9 February 2014 (Berlin); 20 March 2014 (Germany)
- Running time: 110 minutes
- Country: Germany
- Language: German
- Box office: $1,505 (USA only)

Stations of the Cross (German: Kreuzweg) is a 2014 German drama film directed by Dietrich Brüggemann. The film had its premiere in the competition section of the 64th Berlin International Film Festival, where it won the Silver Bear for Best Script.

== Plot ==
Maria is a 14-year-old girl in a family attached to a Traditionalist Catholic organization, (Note: The fictitious Society of St Paul is based on the Society of Saint Pius X. Co-writer Anna Brüggemann and director Dietrich Brüggemann had first-hand experience with that group.) who has dedicated her life to serving God. Over the course of 14 long takes, each echoing and named after the Stations of the Cross which Jesus endured on his path to Golgotha, Maria attempts a path of self-inflicted religious ascesis in the hope that God will cure her younger brother of autism.

== Cast ==
- Lea van Acken as Maria
- Franziska Weisz as Mother
- Florian Stetter as Pater Weber
- Lucie Aron as Bernadette
- Moritz Knapp as Christian
- Klaus Michael Kamp as Father
- Georg Wesch as Thomas
- Birge Schade as PE Teacher
- Ramin Yazdani as Doctor
- Hanns Zischler as Funeral Director

== Reception ==
Reception for the film was mostly positive. Rotten Tomatoes gave the film 91% out of 23 votes, with an average rating of 7.4/10. The critics consensus states that the film is "A drama of thought-provoking depth as well as a showcase for newcomer Lea van Acken, Stations of the Cross hits hard and leaves a lingering impact." On Metacritic, the film has a rating of 68 out of 100, from 11 critics, indicating "generally favorable reviews". Steven Greydanus of Decent Films gave the film an "A−" grade, saying "Stations of the Cross is among the most insightful and devastating cross-examinations of religious fundamentalism that I have ever seen, certainly in a Catholic context. The film is not so much an attack on faith or religion, but an examination of how faith goes wrong."
