= Ladies in Waiting =

Ladies in Waiting may refer to:

- Lady-in-waiting
- Ladies in Waiting (film), a 1940 Czech romantic comedy film
- Las Meninas (The Ladies-in-waiting), a 1656 painting by Diego Velázquez
- "Ladies in Waiting", a song by Kiss on their third album, Dressed to Kill
- The Ladies in Waiting, supporting characters in the musical Six
