= March of Millions =

2007 German television film

- Die Flucht
- Genre: World War II film
- Written by: Gabriela Sperl
- Directed by: Kai Wessel
- Starring: Maria Furtwängler; Jean-Yves Berteloot; Hanns Zischler; Frédéric Vonhof
- Theme music composer: Enjott Schneider
- Country of origin: Germany
- Original language: German
- No. of episodes: 2

Production
- Producers: Katrin Goetter, Nico Hofmann, Joachim Kosack, Sebastian Werninger
- Running time: 179 min (2 parts)
- Budget: €9 million

Original release
- Network: ARD
- Release: 4 March – 5 March 2007

March of Millions, also titled Die Flucht (The Escape), is a German television war drama film. The film stars Maria Furtwängler in the role of Lena Gräfin von Mahlenberg, the leader of a small convoy of refugees from East Prussia (including French and Russian prisoners of war and forced labourers) fleeing the advancing Red Army in the winter of 1944–1945, and trying to survive uprooted in Bavaria in the aftermath of World War II. When first broadcast by ARD in two parts, on 4 and 5 March 2007, it drew 13.5 million viewers.

The production was reported to have cost €9m and to have employed over 2,000 extras.

The film was controversial for portraying German war-time suffering during the evacuation of East Prussia (although a number of German atrocities were also shown or mentioned), and led to adverse comments from Marek Cichocki, the foreign policy advisor to Polish President Lech Kaczyński at the time, fearful of potential German claims to lands or property in East Prussia lost after the World War II. There have been multiple reactions from the Polish side on occasion of other films about the war.

== Awards ==
- 2007 Bambi award as "TV Event of the Year"
- 2007 Bavarian TV Award to Holly Fink (cinematographer)
- 2007 Romy award to Nico Hofmann (producer)
- 2007 Deutscher Fernsehpreis to Knut Loewe and Wiebke Kratz for Best Design
- 2007 Deutscher Fernsehpreis to Enjott Schneider for Best Music
- 2007 Deutscher Fernsehpreis to Gabriela Maria Schmeide as Best Supporting Actress

== Cast ==
- Maria Furtwängler as Magdalena von Mahlenberg
- Jürgen Hentsch as Berthold von Mahlenberg
- Jean-Yves Berteloot as François Beauvais
- Frédéric Vonhof as Louis
- Tonio Arango as Heinrich von Gernstorff
- Angela Winkler as Sophie von Gernstorff
- Hanns Zischler as Rüdiger von Gernstorff
- Max von Thun as Ferdinand von Gernstorff
- Adrian Wahlen as Benno Stuber
- Adrian Goessel as Wilhelm Stuber
- Gabriela Maria Schmeide as Babette
- Stella Kunkat as Viktoria von Mahlenberg
- Fritz Karl as Gauleiter Herrmann
- Winfried Glatzeder as Dietrich (servant)
- Ralf Dittrich as Major Metzger
