= Nýřany =

- Town
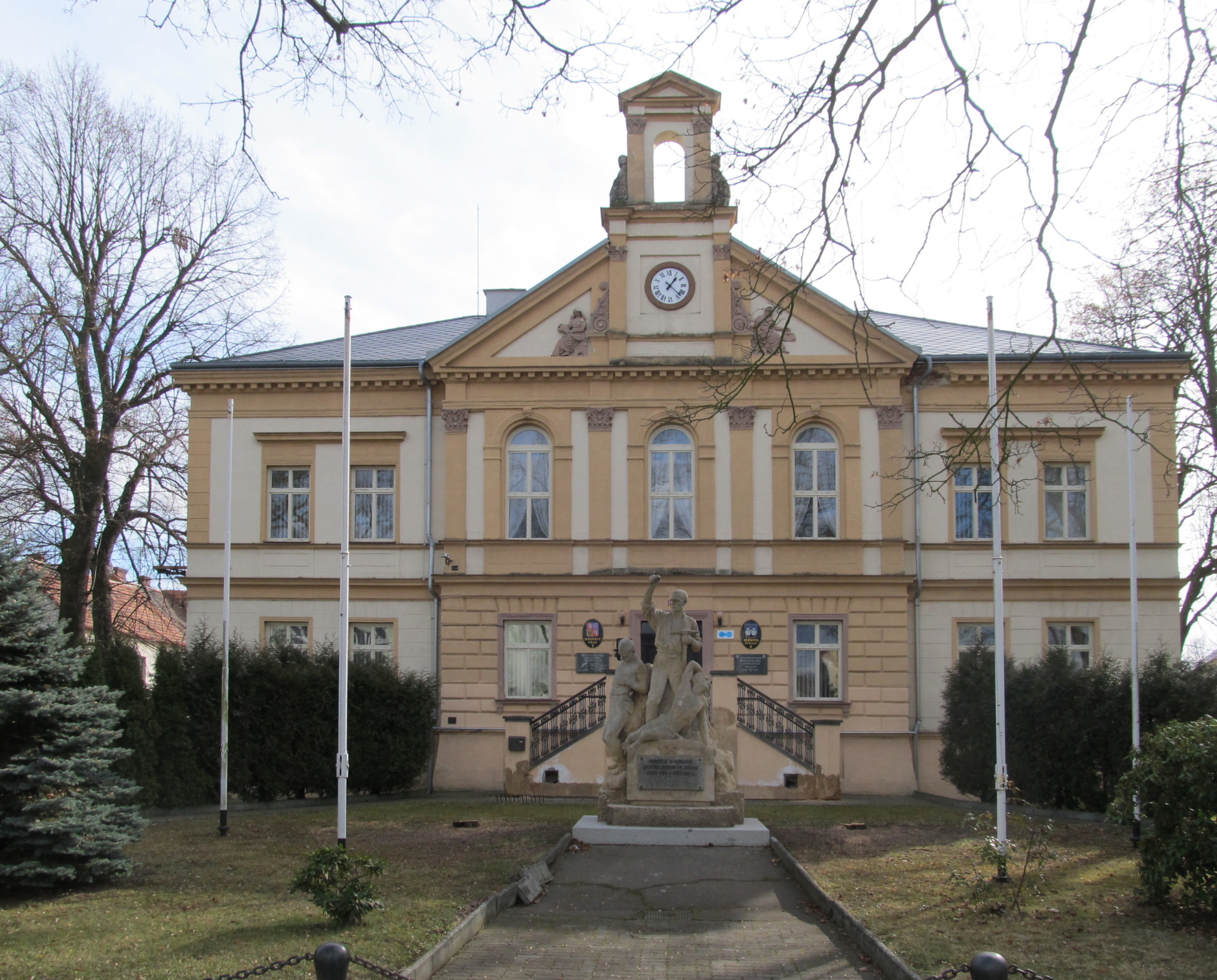
- Town hall

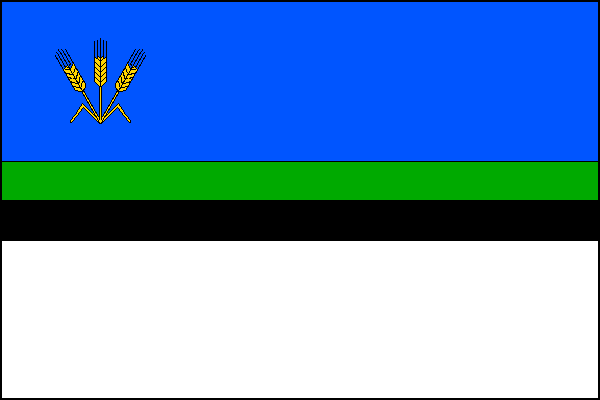
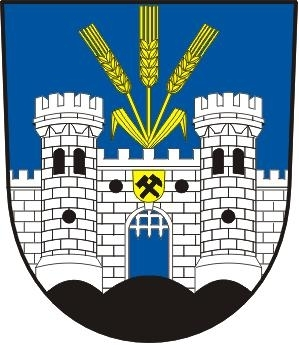
- Flag Coat of arms

- Location in the Czech Republic
- Coordinates: 49°42′42″N 13°12′43″E
- Country: Czech Republic
- Region: Plzeň
- District: Plzeň-North
- First mentioned: 1272

Government
  - Mayor: Pavlína Caisová

Area
  - Total: 21.72 km^{2} (8.39 sq mi)
- Elevation: 345 m (1,132 ft)

Population (2026-01-01)
  - Total: 6,994
  - Density: 322.0/km^{2} (834.0/sq mi)
- Time zone: UTC+1 (CET)
  - Summer (DST): UTC+2 (CEST)
- Postal code: 330 23
- Website: www.nyrany.cz

Nýřany (Czech pronunciation: [ˈniːr̝anɪ]; German: Nürschan) is a town in Plzeň-North District in the Plzeň Region of the Czech Republic. It has about 7,000 inhabitants. The town is located on the stream Vejprnický potok in the Plasy Uplands.

Nýřany was founded in the 13th century at the latest and became a town in 1892. The most important monument in the town is the Church of Saint Procopius.

== Administrative division ==
Nýřany consists of three municipal parts (in brackets population according to the 2021 census):

- Nýřany (5,797)
- Doubrava (263)
- Kamenný Újezd (581)

== Etymology ==
The name Nýřany referred to the settlement of nyrs. The word nyr denoted a person living in a burrow, lair or den of an animal.

== Geography ==
Nýřany is located about 10 kilometres (6 mi) west of Plzeň. It lies in the Plasy Uplands. The highest point is the flat hill Dobrák at 456 m (1,496 ft) above sea level. The stream Vejprnický potok flows through the town.

== History ==
The first written mention of Nýřany is from 1272. The village was promoted to a town by Emperor Franz Joseph I on 29 January 1892.

The village of Kamenný Újezd was first mentioned in 1215 and Doubrava in 1556.

Around 1830, bituminous coal deposits were discovered. The start of mining meant the rapid development of the village, and new people arrived. The peak of mining was in 1880, when 9,300 people was employed in about 40 mines. The mining ended in 1995. Those mines sometimes yielded valuable well-preserved fossils of early amphibians.

During World War II, Nýřany was annexed by Nazi Germany and administered as part of the Reichsgau Sudetenland. Near the end of the war one transport of death was surprised by an airstrike and about hundred of prisoners managed to escape. They were chased by SS-Guards and local Germans and either killed on the spot or executed at the place called Humboldtka.

== Demographics ==
Historical population

Year	Pop.	±%
1869	3,176	—
1880	5,631	+77.3%
1890	6,622	+17.6%
1900	7,219	+9.0%
1910	7,230	+0.2%

Year	Pop.	±%
1921	7,457	+3.1%
1930	7,600	+1.9%
1950	5,424	−28.6%
1961	5,871	+8.2%
1970	6,191	+5.5%

Year	Pop.	±%
1980	6,419	+3.7%
1991	7,158	+11.5%
2001	6,913	−3.4%
2011	6,965	+0.8%
2021	6,641	−4.7%

Source: Censuses

== Transport ==
The D5 motorway from Plzeň to the Czech–German border in Rozvadov runs through the southern part of the municipal territory.

Nýřany is located on the railway line Plzeň–Domažlice. In addition, a local railway line that leads to Heřmanova Huť starts here.

== Sights ==
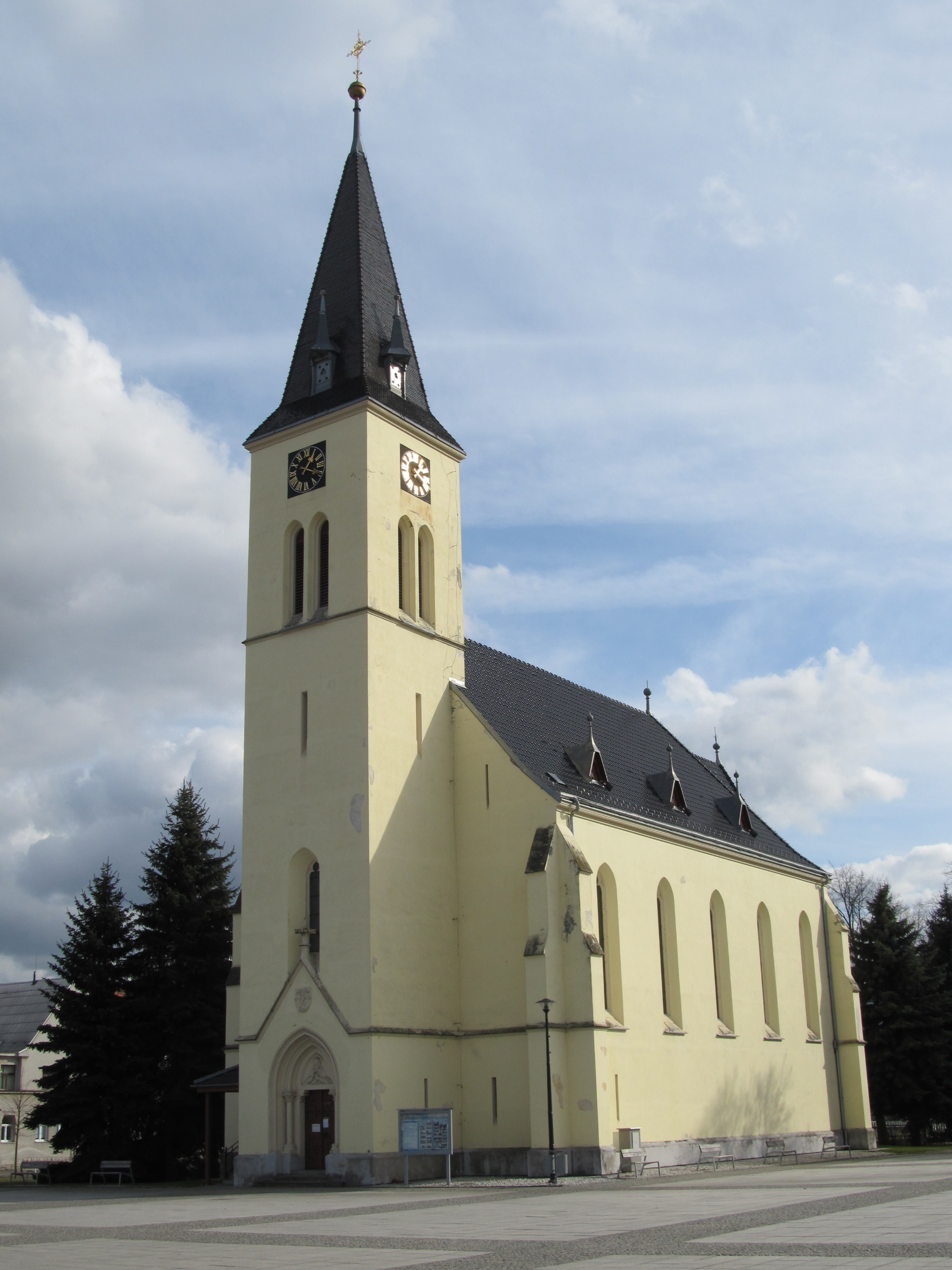
Church of Saint Procopius

The most important monument is the Church of Saint Procopius in the middle of the town square. It was built in the pseudo-Gothic style in 1903–1904.

The Neo-Renaissance town hall was built in 1885–1886. It was built before Nýřany became a town. Until the church was built, the building was also used for religious services. The Monument of Shot Miners stands in front of the town hall. It commemorates an incident when 13 miners were shot during the 1890 strike.

The Chapel of Saint Wenceslaus was built in the 18th century on the site of a former chapel from 1595.

== Notable people ==
- Anna Letenská (1904–1942), actress

== Twin towns – sister cities ==
Nýřany is twinned with:

- Zeulenroda-Triebes, Germany
