= All My Loving (film) =

2019 film

- Film poster
- Directed by: Edward Berger
- Written by: Edward Berger
- Starring: Lars Eidinger
- Release dates: 9 February 2019 (Berlin); 23 May 2019 (Germany)
- Country: Germany
- Language: German

All My Loving is a 2019 German drama film directed by Edward Berger. It was shown in the Panorama section at the 69th Berlin International Film Festival.

== Cast ==
- Lars Eidinger – Stefan Hoffmann
- Nele Mueller-Stöfen – Julia Hoffmann
- Hans Löw – Tobias Hoffmann
- Mathilde Berger – Vicky Hoffmann
- Christine Schorn – Ebba Hoffmann
- Manfred Zapatka – Pit Hoffmann

== Reception ==
=== Critical response ===
David Rooney of The Hollywood Reporter wrote ″In press notes, Berger offers up his admiration of American independent directors like Ang Lee, Todd Haynes, Todd Solondz, Lisa Cholodenko and Noah Baumbach, citing The Ice Storm, Happiness and The Kids are Alright among his influences. I failed to see any trace of that in All My Loving, which has as much teeth and personality as a gummy bear. Even when the struggles faced by the characters are major life blows like the loss of a child or parent, or the abrupt cutoff of a career, there’s little emotional heft. And the conclusion merely tacks on a tidy wrap-up that’s meant to make us share the joy and hope of renewal of characters we’ve been given scant reason to care about.″

Screen Daily's Fionnuala Halligan wrote ″Although its tri-partite structure and concentration on the ebb-and-flow of domestic affairs imply a lack of cinematic urgency, this is a very satisfying film for connoisseurs of fine drama.″

Ola Salwa of Cineuropa wrote ″What makes All My Loving stand out is its tone and compassionate approach to the protagonists. Berger doesn’t judge or feel contempt towards the “poor little kids” – his storytelling style is subtle and elegant, as is his way of working with his actors. They all play down their emotions in order to let the audience into the inner world of their characters, but without revealing too much. Therefore, what could have been yet another pretentious accusation levelled at middle-class indolence is, in fact, a touching, engaging, intimate sit-down with people whom we wish could be slightly better versions of themselves.″
