= The Privilege =

- German: Das Privileg
- Directed by: Felix Fuchssteiner; Katharina Schöde
- Written by: Felix Fuchssteiner; Sebastian Niemann; Katharina Schöde; Eckhard Vollmar
- Starring: Max Schimmelpfennig; Lise Risom Olsen; Caroline Hartig
- Production company: Bavaria Fiction
- Distributed by: Netflix
- Release date: 9 February 2022
- Running time: 107 minutes
- Country: Germany
- Language: German

The Privilege (German: Das Privileg) is a 2022 German film directed by Felix Fuchssteiner and Katharina Schöde, written by Felix Fuchssteiner, Sebastian Niemann, Katharina Schöde and Eckhard Vollmar and starring Max Schimmelpfennig, Lise Risom Olsen and Caroline Hartig. It was released by Netflix on 9 February 2022.

== Cast ==
In order of appearance, not billing:

- Lise Risom Olsen as Yvonne Bergmann
- Caroline Hartig as Anna
- Lea van Acken as Lena
- Roman Knizka as Martin Bergmann
- Nadeshda Brennicke as Dr. Steinke
- Horst Janson as Grandpa Bergmann
- Mike Hoffmann as Chief inspector Gerber
- Janina Agnes Schröder as Surgical nurse
- Swetlana Schönfeld as Mrs Eriksson
- Dieter Bach as Agent Trondthal
- Jan Andreesen as Emergency physician
- Christine Rollar as Mrs Scheer
- Laurenz Wiegand as Sanitäter / Notarzt
- Christof Düro as Polizist
- Leonas Sielaff as Finn Bergmann (kid)
- Tijan Marei as Samira Shirvani
