= Karel Reiner =

Czech composer and pianist

Karel Reiner (27 June 1910 – 17 October 1979) was a Czech composer and pianist. He was persecuted by Nazis as a Jew and by communists as a formalist. He was the only classical composer to survive the concentration camp in Theresienstadt.

== Life ==
He was born in Žatec, Bohemia into a Jewish family. His father Josef was a kantor in Žatec's synagogue. He studied law, and acquired his doctorate in 1934. In 1929 he also studied composition privately with Alois Hába and composed Fantasia for Quarter - tone piano. In 1931 he graduated from the Master School of Composition with Orchestral suite, as a student of Josef Suk. Reiner was also a concert pianist who cooperated with Theatre of Emil František Burian (1934–1938). During World War II; he was imprisoned in Nazi concentration camps, first in Theresienstadt (deported on 7 July 1943), he participated in musical activities there, created incidental music for the play Esther, directed by Norbert Frýd. Later, on 28 September 1944, he was deported to Auschwitz-Birkenau, afterwards to Landsberg and finally to Kaufering, a subcamp of the Dachau camp. Following the death march and liberation he returned to Prague, where he reunited with his wife Hana (she also survived the imprisonment in concentration camps). He had problems with gaining his Czech citizenship after the war, even though as an adult he considered himself always as a Czech, not a Jew or German. He began to participate in music life again, but soon after the communist Victorious February in 1948 he was accused of formalism. Reiner was member of the Communist Party of Czechoslovakia since 1948, but he left in 1969. He died in Prague in 1979.

== Style ==
Reiner's musical output was created during fifty years, since 1928/9 to 1979, and was firmly connected with the political situation in Czechoslovakia in the 20th century. His first artistic period was influenced by his teachers and models (Alois Hába, Josef Suk, Emil František Burian, and Erwin Schulhoff), it was part of Czech artistic avant-garde, and it was later rejected by communists as formalism. After the critique of the party he was forced to find new, more traditional and conservative ways of composing. This period lasted roughly to 1960. The last period (1960–79) is considered the most artistically valuable. The musical trends in Czechoslovakia were freer in that time and Reiner thus was able to show his expressive musical thinking. He composed almost in all musical categories, created vocal works (songs, choirs), instrumental works (for solo instrument, chamber, symphonic), vocal-instrumental works (cantata, opera), film music, incidental music, composed popular dance songs at the start of his career, and was inspired also by jazz and folk music. He composed for almost all instruments, including bass clarinet, dulcimer, solo drums and for baritone saxophone.

A re-interpretation of songs from the Květěný kůň cycle and a performance from the Terezín ghetto Staročeská Esther was prepared by Aida Mujačič.

== Selected works ==
- 9 veselých improvizací (9 Gladsome Improvisations) for piano (1929)
- 5 jazzových studií (5 Jazz Studies) for piano (1930)
- Suite for large orchestra (1931)
- Koncertantní suita (Concertant Suite) for wind instruments and percussion (1947)
- Symphony No.1 (1959)
- Symfonická předehra (Symphonic Overture) for large orchestra (1963)
- Trio for flute, bass clarinet and percussion (1964)
- Concerto for bass clarinet, string orchestra and percussion (1965)
- Hudba (Music) for 4 clarinets (1965)
- Koncertantní suita (Concertant Suite) for large orchestra (1967)
- Concertino for bassoon, wind instruments and percussion (1969)
- Repliky (Replicas), Trio for flute, viola and harp (1973)
- Allocuzioni per orchestra da camera (1975)
- Sloky (Verses) for viola and piano (1975)
- Tři symfonické věty (3 Symphonic Movements) for orchestra (1978)
