= 64th Berlin International Film Festival =

2014 film festival in Berlin, Germany

- Festival poster
- Opening film: The Grand Budapest Hotel
- Closing film: Black Coal, Thin Ice
- Location: Berlin, Germany
- Founded: 1951
- Awards: Golden Bear: Black Coal, Thin Ice
- Hosted by: Anke Engelke
- No. of films: 395 films
- Festival date: 6–16 February 2014
- Website: http://www.berlinale.de

Berlin International Film Festival chronology
- 65th 63rd

The 64th annual Berlin International Film Festival was held from 6 to 16 February 2014. Wes Anderson's film The Grand Budapest Hotel opened the festival.

British film director Ken Loach was presented with the Honorary Golden Bear. The Golden Bear was awarded to the Chinese film Black Coal, Thin Ice directed by Diao Yinan, which also served as closing film.

== Juries ==
The following people were announced as being on the jury for the festival:

=== Main Competition ===
- James Schamus, American film producer and screenwriter - Jury President
- Barbara Broccoli, American film producer
- Trine Dyrholm, Danish actress
- Mitra Farahani, Iranian filmmaker
- Greta Gerwig, American actress and filmmaker
- Michel Gondry, French filmmaker and producer
- Tony Leung, Chinese actor
- Christoph Waltz, Austrian actor

=== Best First Feature Award ===
- Nancy Buirski, American filmmaker, producer and founder of the Full Frame Documentary Film Festival
- Valeria Golino, Italian actress and filmmaker
- Hernán Musaluppi, Argentinian film producer

=== Short Film Competition ===
- Edwin, Indonesian filmmaker
- Nuno Rodrigues, Portuguese curator and producer
- Christine Tohmé, Lebanese curator

== Official Sections ==
=== Main Competition ===
The following films were selected for the main competition for the Golden Bear and Silver Bear awards:

English title	Original title	Director(s)	Production country
'71		Yann Demange	United Kingdom
Aloft		Claudia Llosa	Spain, Canada, France
Beloved Sisters	Die geliebten Schwestern	Dominik Graf	Germany
Black Coal, Thin Ice	白日焰火	Diao Yinan	China
Blind Massage	推拿	Lou Ye	China, France
Boyhood		Richard Linklater	United States
Futuro Beach	Praia do Futuro	Karim Aïnouz	Brazil, Germany
The Grand Budapest Hotel		Wes Anderson	United Kingdom, Germany
History of Fear	Historia del Miedo	Benjamín Naishtat	Argentina, Uruguay, Germany, France
Inbetween Worlds	Zwischen Welten	Feo Aladag	Germany
In Order of Disappearance	Kraftidioten	Hans Petter Moland	Norway
Jack		Edward Berger	Germany
Life of Riley	Aimer, boire et chanter	Alain Resnais	France
The Little House	小さいおうち	Yoji Yamada	Japan
Macondo	Macondo	Sudabeh Mortezai	Austria
No Man's Land	無人區	Ning Hao	China
Stations of the Cross	Kreuzweg	Dietrich Brüggemann	Germany
Stratos	Μικρό Ψάρι	Yannis Economides	Greece, Germany, Cyprus
The Third Side of the River	La tercera orilla	Celina Murga	Argentina, Germany, Netherlands
Two Men in Town	La voie de l‘ennemi	Rachid Bouchareb	France, Algeria, United States, Belgium

=== Out of competition ===
The following films were selected to be screened out of competition:

English title	Original title	Director(s)	Production country
The Monuments Men		George Clooney	United States
Nymphomaniac		Lars von Trier	Denmark, Germany, France
Beauty and the Beast	La belle et la bête	Christophe Gans	France, Germany

=== Panorama ===
The following films were selected for the Panorama section:

English title	Original title	Director(s)	Production country
If You Don't, I Will	Arrête ou je continue	Sophie Fillières	France
The Rice Bomber	白米炸彈客	Cho Li	Taiwan
Ice Poison	冰毒	Midi Z	Taiwan, Myanmar
Calvary		John Michael McDonagh	Ireland, United Kingdom
The Way He Looks	Hoje Eu Quero Voltar Sozinho	Daniel Ribeiro	Brazil
Is the Man Who Is Tall Happy?		Michel Gondry	France
The Man of the Crowd	O Homem das Multidões	Marcelo Gomes, Cao Guimarães	Brazil
Papilio Buddha		Jayan Cherian	India, United States
Quick Change	Quick Change	Eduardo Roy Jr.	Philippines
Stereo		Maximilian Erlenwein	Germany
Test		Chris Mason Johnson	United States
The Better Angels		A. J. Edwards	United States
The Lamb	Kuzu	Kutluğ Ataman	Germany, Turkey
Things People Do		Saar Klein	United States
Triptych	Triptyque	Robert Lepage, Pedro Pires	Canada
Superegos	Über-Ich und Du	Benjamin Heisenberg	Germany, Switzerland, Austria
Unfriend		Joselito Altarejos	Philippines
Journey to the West	西遊	Tsai Ming-liang	France, Taiwan
Yves Saint Laurent	Yves Saint Laurent	Jalil Lespert	France
I'm Not Angry!	Asabani Nistam!	Reza Dormishian	Iran
Blind		Eskil Vogt	Norway, Netherlands
Difret		Zeresenay Berhane Mehari	Ethiopia
Fever	Fieber	Elfi Mikesch	Luxembourg, Austria
Güeros		Alonso Ruízpalacios	Mexico
Highway		Imtiaz Ali	India
Homeland	Ieji	Nao Kubota	Japan
Quiet Bliss	In Grazia di Dio	Edoardo Winspeare	Italy
Love Is Strange		Ira Sachs	United States
That Demon Within	魔警	Dante Lam	Hong Kong
Standing Aside, Watching	Na kathese ke na kitas	Yorgos Servetas	Greece
Night Flight	Yaganbihaeng	Leesong Hee-il	South Korea
2030	Nước	Nghiêm-Minh Nguyễn-Võ	Vietnam
Brides	Patardzlebi	Tinatin Kajrishvili	Georgia, France
Cracks in Concrete	Risse im Beton	Umut Dağ	Austria
The Midnight After	那夜凌晨，我坐上了旺角開往大埔的	Fruit Chan	Hong Kong
Land of Storms	Viharsarok	Adam Császi	Hungary
The Night	Ye	Hao Zhou	China

=== Berlinale Special Gala ===
The following films were selected for the Berlinale Special Gala section:

English title	Original title	Director(s)	Production country
A Long Way Down		Pascal Chaumeil	United Kingdom, Germany
American Hustle		David O. Russell	United States
Cesar Chavez		Diego Luna	United States
In the Courtyard	Dans la cour	Pierre Salvadori	France
The Hundred-Year-Old Man Who Climbed Out of the Window and Disappeared	Hundraåringen som klev ut genom fönstret och försvann	Felix Herngren	Sweden
The Turning		Anthology with 20 different directors	Australia
The Dark Valley	Das finstere Tal	Andreas Prochaska	Austria, Germany
Diplomacy	Diplomatie	Volker Schlöndorff	France, Germany
The Two Faces of January		Hossein Amini	United Kingdom, United States, France
Someone You Love	En du Elsker	Pernille Fischer Christensen	Denmark

=== Berlinale Classics ===
The following films were selected to be screened in the Berlinale Classics section:

English title	Original title	Director(s)	Production country
Late Autumn (1960)	秋日和	Yasujirō Ozu	Japan
Caravaggio (1986)		Derek Jarman	United Kingdom
The Cabinet of Dr. Caligari (1920)	Das Cabinet des Dr. Caligari	Robert Wiene	Germany
Germany, Pale Mother (1980)	Deutschland, bleiche Mutter	Helma Sanders-Brahms	East Germany
The Hero (1966)	Nayak	Satyajit Ray	India
Rebel Without a Cause (1955)		Nicholas Ray	United States

== Official Awards ==
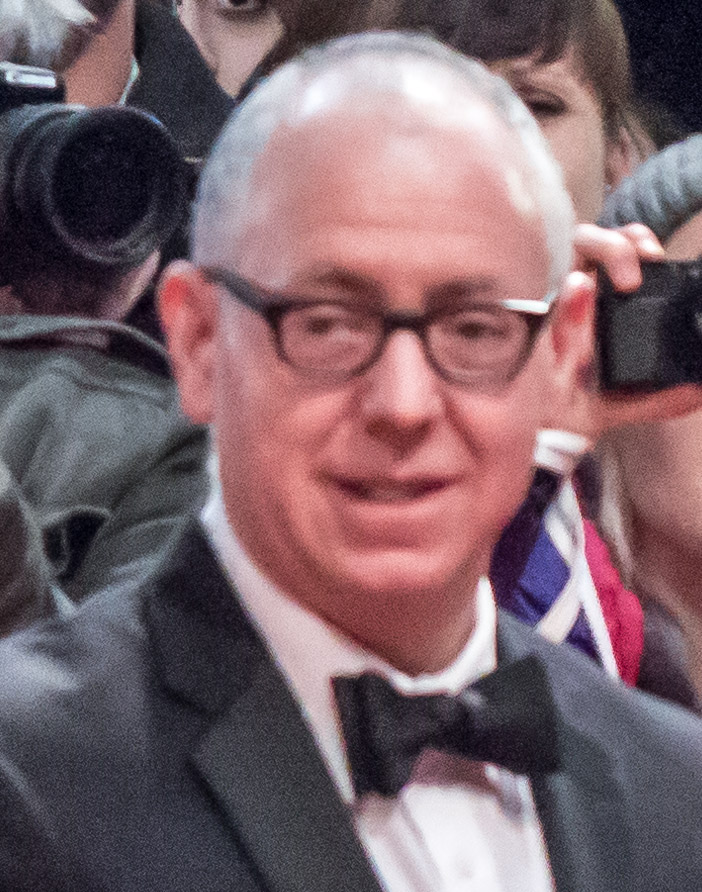
James Schamus, Jury President

The following prizes were awarded:

=== Main Competition ===
- Golden Bear: Black Coal, Thin Ice by Diao Yinan
- Silver Bear Grand Jury Prize: The Grand Budapest Hotel by Wes Anderson
- Alfred Bauer Prize: Life of Riley by Alain Resnais
- Silver Bear for Best Director: Richard Linklater for Boyhood
- Silver Bear for Best Actress: Haru Kuroki for The Little House
- Silver Bear for Best Actor: Liao Fan for Black Coal, Thin Ice
- Silver Bear for Best Screenplay: Stations of the Cross by Dietrich Brüggemann
- Silver Bear for Outstanding Artistic Contribution: Blind Massage by Lou Ye (Cinematography)

=== Honorary Golden Bear ===
- Ken Loach

=== Best First Feature Award ===
- Güeros by Alonso Ruizpalacios

== Independent Awards ==
=== Panorama Audience Award ===
- 1st Place: Difret by Zeresenay Berhane Mehari
- 2nd Place: The Way He Looks by Daniel Ribeiro
- 3rd Place: Brides by Tinatin Kajrishvili

=== Teddy Award ===
- The Way He Looks by Daniel Ribeiro
