= Jack (2014 film) =

2014 film

- Film poster
- Directed by: Edward Berger
- Written by: Edward Berger; Nele Mueller-Stöfen
- Starring: Ivo Pietzcker as Jack
- Cinematography: Jens Harant
- Edited by: Janina Herhoffer
- Music by: Christoph M. Kaiser and Julian Maas
- Distributed by: Beta Cinema
- Release date: 7 February 2014 (Berlin)
- Running time: 103 minutes
- Country: Germany
- Language: German

Jack is a 2014 German drama film directed by Edward Berger. The film had its world premiere in the competition section of the 64th Berlin International Film Festival. It was praised by critics and won several significant German awards.

== Plot ==
10-year-old Jack and his 6-year-old brother Manuel live with their single mother in Berlin. They are closely attached to her, and though she loves them, she neglects her duties as a mother, preferring to go out partying all night and leaving Jack on his own to take care of the household and babysitting his brother. Circumstances lead to the children living on the street for a weekend.

== Cast ==
- Ivo Pietzcker as Jack
- Georg Arms as Manuel
- Luise Heyer as Sanna
- Nele Mueller-Stöfen as Becki
- Vincent Redetzki as Jonas
- Jacob Matschenz as Philipp
- Odine Johne as Kati
- Johann Jürgens as Mattes
- Atheer Adel as Ophir
- Anthony Arnold as Danilo
- Amar Saaifan as Marc
- Justine Ewerth as Tanja

== Production ==
Director Edward Berger co-wrote the script for Jack, his third feature film, with regular collaborator, actress and screenwriter Nele Mueller-Stöfen (also his wife), who plays Becki in the film.

Berger said in 2023 that he had always looked for a challenge in filmmaking: "That started with Jack, where the camera was really only on the boy's face, because I didn't want to give the audience any choice but to identify with him".

It was a Port-au-Prince production in association with CinePlus, MixtVision, Neue Bioskop, and Zero West; Jan Krüger and René Römert produced the film, along with seven co-producers. Janina Herhoffer was film editor, and the music was by Christoph M. Kaiser and Julian Maas.

== Release ==
The film had its premiere in the competition section of the 64th Berlin International Film Festival.

Jack's international distribution was handled by Beta Cinema of Munich.

== Reception ==
The film was well-received by critics. Ştefan Dobroiu, writing on Cineuropa, praised the screenplay, Jens Harant's cinematography, and the acting, in particular the performance of Ivo Pietzcker as Jack. Guy Lodge of Variety concurred.

Chris Binding, writing in Flickfeast, compared the film to Truffaut's 400 Blows in its subject matter, but differing in its ending, in that it leaves "on a note of hope rather than horror". Binding called the film "Deeply character-driven and beautifully shot,... part family–drama, part psychological road movie".

Leslie Felperin, writing in The Hollywood Reporter, was less complimentary, saying that the film covered similar ground to that of films like Ursula Meier's 2012 film Sister, and not saying anything new. Felperin praised Pietzcker's performance, but criticised the script for not giving more of Sanna's backstory.

== Accolades ==
Jack was one of eight films shortlisted by Germany to be their submission for the Academy Award for Best Foreign Language Film at the 88th Academy Awards, but it lost out to Labyrinth of Lies.

It was also nominated for several awards, winning some. These included:

- 2014: Deutscher Regiepreis Metropolis (German Directors Guild Awards), Best Film and Best Director awards, for Jack
- 2015: Bavarian Film Awards, Best Young Producer, for Jack
- 2015: German Film Prize in Silver for the Best Feature Film for Jack (also nominated for Best Direction and Best Screenplay)
