= Edward Berger =

Austrian and Swiss filmmaker (born 1970)

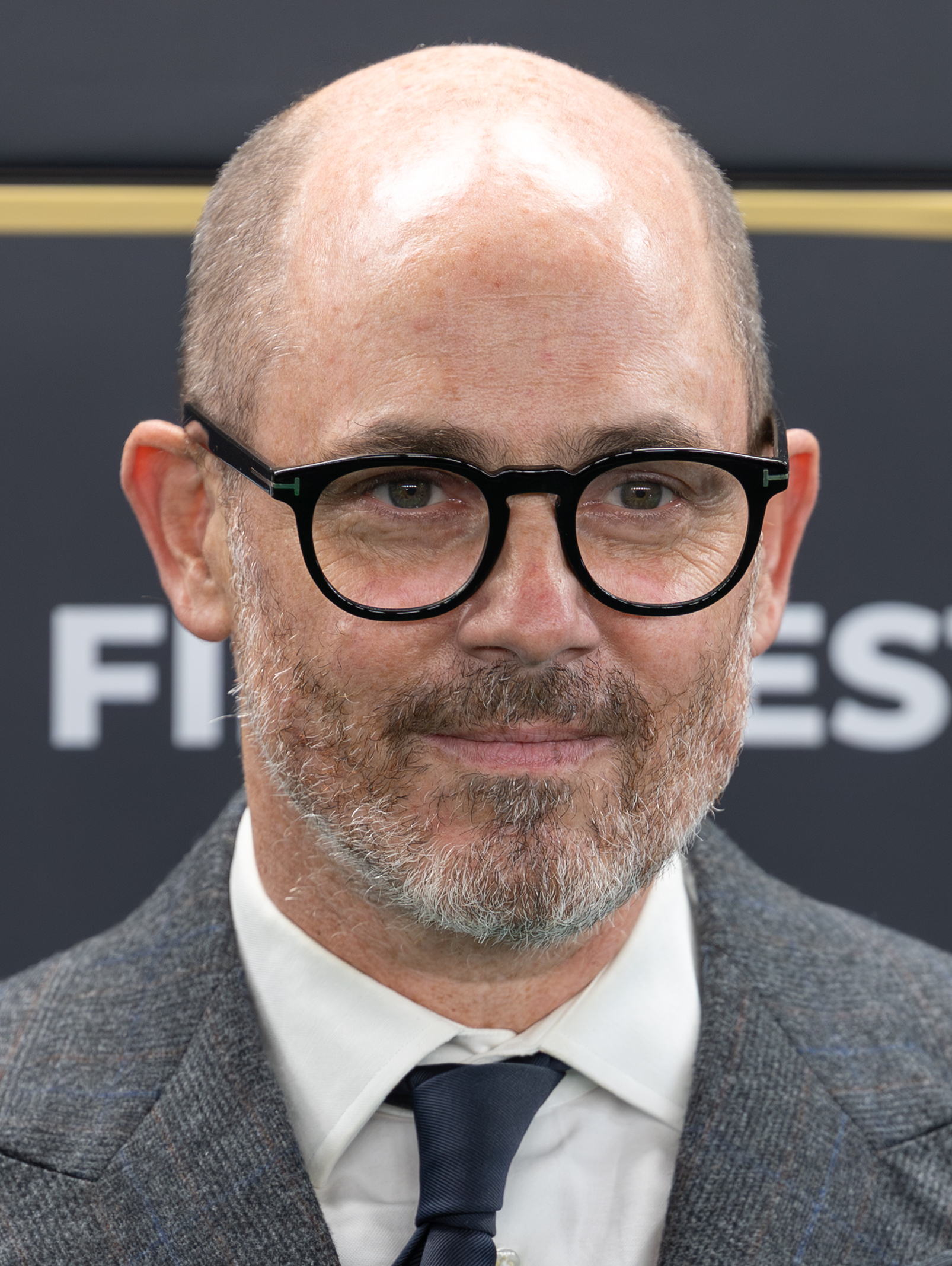
- Berger in 2025
- Born: 6 March 1970 (age 56); Wolfsburg, West Germany
- Citizenship: Swiss; Austrian
- Education: Hochschule für Bildende Künste Braunschweig (1991); Tisch School of the Arts (1994)
- Occupations: Film director; producer; screenwriter
- Years active: 1994–present
- Works: Deutschland 83 (2015); Patrick Melrose (2018); All Quiet on the Western Front (2022); Conclave (2024)

Edward Berger (German: [ˈɛtvaʁt ˈbɛʁɡɐ]; born 1970) is a Swiss and Austrian director and screenwriter. He is known for his work in Germany, where he was born and grew up, such as the German films Jack (2014), All My Loving (2019), and All Quiet on the Western Front (2022), as well as his English-language debut Conclave (2024). He also directed several television series including Deutschland 83 (2015) and Patrick Melrose (2018).

All Quiet on the Western Front won Berger an Academy Award for Best International Film, was nominated for Best Adapted Screenplay, and won three British Academy Film Awards. For Conclave, Berger received his first Golden Globe nomination for Best Director and a BAFTA for Outstanding British Film.

== Early life and education ==
Berger was born in 1970 in Wolfsburg, Lower Saxony, then West Germany. His mother was from Switzerland, and his father, who worked as a logistics manager at Volkswagen, was from Austria. He grew up in a middle-class family with three siblings.

Berger graduated from Theodor-Heuss-Gymnasium in Wolfsburg in the late 1980s. After graduating from the Gymnasium, he attended the Hochschule für Bildende Künste Braunschweig from 1990 to 1991. He then transferred to the Tisch School of the Arts at New York University, where he finished his studies in directing in 1994.

He moved to Berlin in 1997.

Berger has both Swiss and Austrian citizenship through his parents. He told Die Welt in 2023 that while he is not German by passport, he supports Germany in international football tournaments. "If Germany plays Switzerland, I'm for Germany", he told Variety. He told Die Zeit in 2023: "My father is Austrian, my mother Swiss, so there would be enough reason for me to be a little confused. What I always know is: I am European".

== Career ==
=== 1992–2017: Early work and German films ===
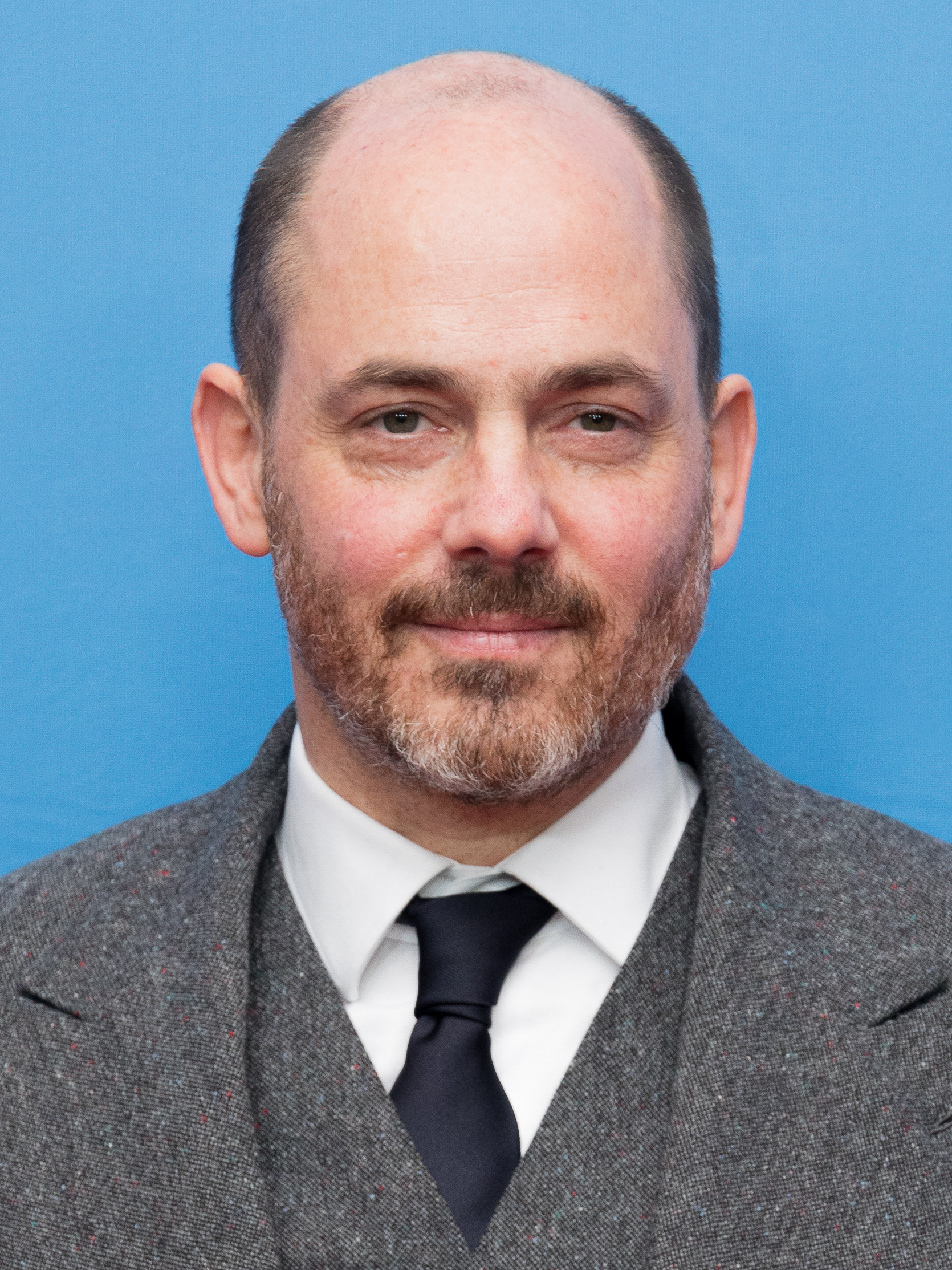
Berger at the 2018 Berlinale

Berger has worked mostly in Germany and the United States. He gathered his first work experience at the U.S. independent production company Good Machine, working, among others, on the films of Ang Lee, Todd Haynes, and Edward Burns. In 1994 he headed the production department of the company. In 1996 he gave a guest lecture at Columbia University film school, and at Universität der Künste Berlin and at the HFF Potsdam.

His first feature film, based on his own screenplay, was Gomez – Kopf oder Zahl ("Gomez – Heads or Tails"), in 1998. In 2002, he directed a telemovie called Asylum, which was nominated for the International Emmy Award as well as the Grimme-Preis in Germany. In 2004, he wrote and directed a telemovie, Welcome to the Club.

In 2008, he worked as a screenwriter and director for four episodes of season 2 of television series KDD – Kriminaldauerdienst (KDD – Berlin Crime Squad). In 2012, his film A Good Summer was awarded the Grimme-Preis.

Berger co-wrote the script for his third feature film, Jack with regular collaborator Nele Mueller-Stöfen (also his wife). The film premiered in competition at the 2014 Berlinale, and was awarded the 2015 German Film Award in silver for the best feature film, after being nominated for Best Picture, Best Director, and Best Screenplay. It also won Best Director and Best Picture at the German Directors Guild Awards. Berger said in 2023 that he has always looked for a challenge in filmmaking: "That started with Jack, where the camera was really only on the boy's face, because I didn't want to give the audience any choice but to identify with him".

In August 2014, Berger directed the eight-part television series Deutschland 83, which premiered as a special entry in the 2015 Berlinale. It was sold internationally, including to Canal+ in France and Channel 4 in the UK, and became the first German television show ever to air in the US. The series won an International Emmy in 2016.

=== 2018–present: Mainstream acclaim and independent film success ===
He also directed the limited series Patrick Melrose (2018), starring Benedict Cumberbatch, for which he won his first BAFTA Award, for Best Limited Series. His feature film All My Loving premiered on 9 February 2019, in the Panorama section of the 2019 Berlinale. The film was nominated in several categories for the preselection of the 2019 German Film Award.

Berger wrote, directed, and produced All Quiet on the Western Front, released in 2022. The film received more Oscar nominations than any other German film before it (nine), after winning seven BAFTAs, surpassing the previous record of five set by Cinema Paradiso in 1988. At the Oscars, it won Best International Film. It was praised by critics internationally, but German reviewers and historians criticised it for its lack of closeness to the book and lack of historical accuracy.

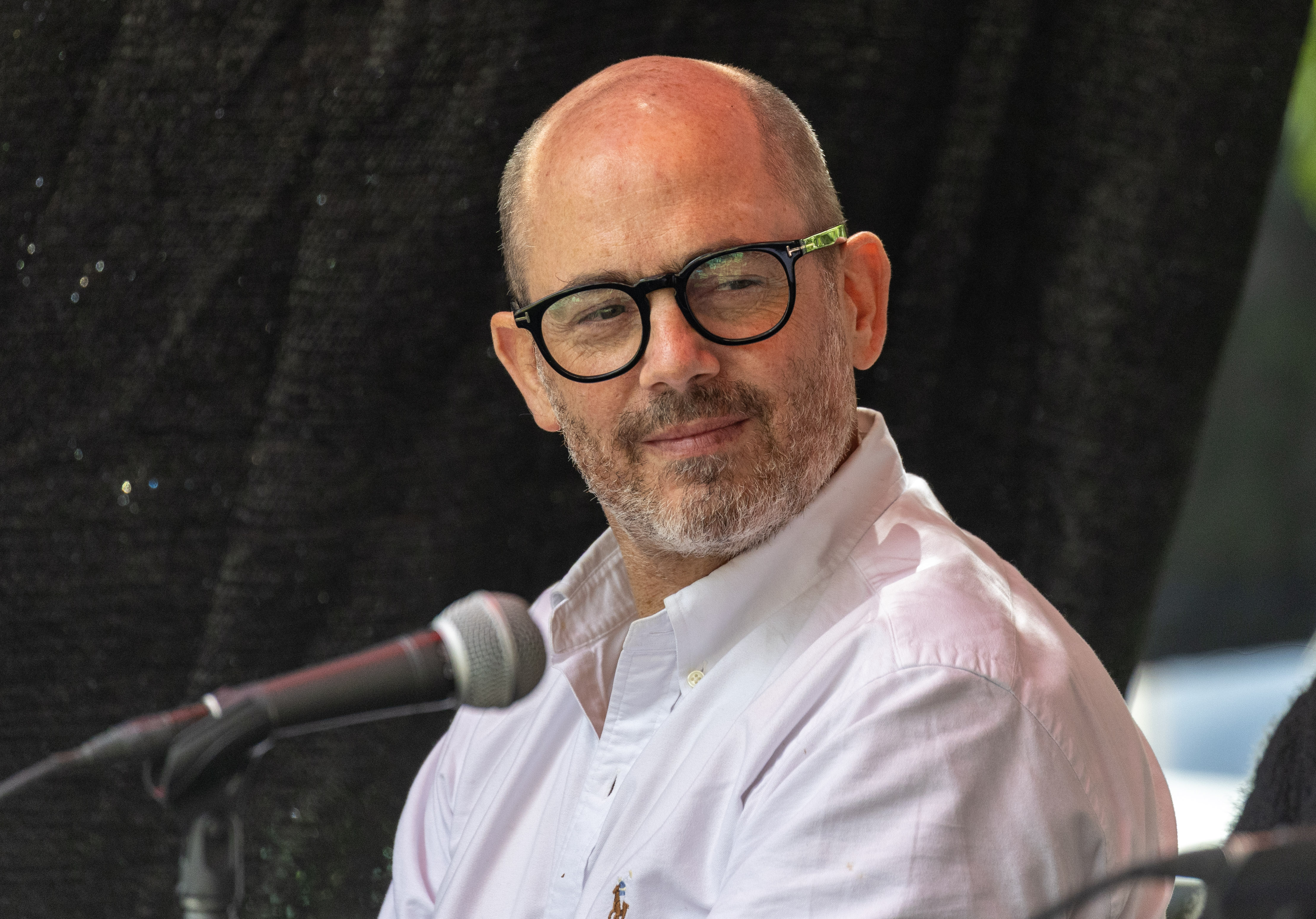
Berger at the 2025 Telluride Film Festival

His 2024 film Conclave, a drama set in the Holy See based on a novel by Robert Harris, enjoyed great success, both critically and with audiences. He described the film compared with All Quiet on the Western Front, as "like [going] from a physical war to an intellectual war. It felt like one of those great political conspiracy thrillers from the 1970s".

In 2025 Berger made the feature Ballad of a Small Player starring Colin Farrell. The film was poorly received with a Rotten Tomatoes rating of 49 and a Metacritic rating of 46. Alison Willmore’s New York Magazine review entitled "Maybe the Conclave Guy Is Actually Bad at Making Movies?" states "this new movie suggests that Berger isn't capable of rising above his source material or, in this case, even meeting it... it all feels like discount Wes Anderson".

==== Upcoming projects ====
Berger has been slated to direct the next film in the Bourne franchise. However, in October 2024 Berger was vague about his involvement in the film: "It's really not clear whether… I'm doing that film or not. I'm not doing it right now. And I really don't know what I will do in the future".

Berger has signed to direct the science fiction thriller film The Barrier, starring Austin Butler and written by MacMillan Hedges, based on his own short story of the same name. He is also set to direct a film about Evan Gershkovich, with David Weil set to pen the script. Berger is also attached to direct The Riders, starring Brad Pitt and written by David Kajganich, based on the novel of the same name by Tim Winton. He also produced Fatherland (2026), a biopic of Thomas Mann directed by Paweł Pawlikowski.

In February 2026, it was announced that Berger will direct, as will as co-produce, a biopic about Lance Armstrong, starring Austin Butler and written by Zach Baylin.

== Personal life ==
Berger is married to German actress and screenwriter Nele Mueller-Stöfen. She has starred in several of Berger's films, as well as collaborating on the script of Jack.

== Filmography ==
=== Film ===
Year	Title	Director	Writer	Producer	Refs.
2014	Jack	Yes	Yes	No	
2019	All My Loving	Yes	Yes	No	
2022	All Quiet on the Western Front	Yes	Yes	Yes	
2024	Conclave	Yes	No	Executive	
2025	Ballad of a Small Player	Yes	No	Yes	
TBA	The Riders	Yes	No	Yes	Filming

Producer

Year	Title	Producer	Refs.
2026	Fatherland	Yes	

=== Television ===
TV movie

Year	Title	Director	Writer
1992	Strait-Jacket	Yes	Yes
1993	Sidewalk Hotel	Yes	Yes
1994	Schrottplatz Träumereien	Yes	Yes
1995	Wanderbread	Yes	Yes
1998	Gomez – Kopf oder Zahl	Yes	Yes
2001	Female 2 Seeks Happy End	Yes	Yes
2007	Windland	Yes	No
2011	A Good Summer	Yes	Yes
2012	Mom's Gotta Go	Yes	No

TV series

Year	Title	Director	Writer	Notes
2001–2002	Schimanski	Yes	No	2 episodes
2004	Bloch	Yes	No	Episode "Schwestern"
2005–2006	Unter Verdacht	Yes	Yes	Wrote 2 episodes / directed 1 episode
2006–2013	Tatort	Yes	No	2 episodes
2008	KDD – Kriminaldauerdienst	Yes	Yes	Director of 3 episodes / Writer of 2 episodes
2010	Polizeiruf 110	Yes	Yes	Episode "Aquarius"
2015	Deutschland 83	Yes	No	5 episodes
2018	The Terror	Yes	No	3 episodes
2018	Patrick Melrose	Yes	No	Miniseries
2019	Eden	No	Yes	Creator; 6 episodes
2020	Your Honor	Yes	No	3 episodes

== Awards and nominations ==
Organizations	Year	Category	Work	Result	Ref.
Academy Awards	2023	Best Adapted Screenplay	All Quiet on the Western Front	Nominated	
Academy Awards	2023	Best International Feature Film	All Quiet on the Western Front	Accepted	
BAFTA Awards	2023	Best Direction	All Quiet on the Western Front	Won	
BAFTA Awards	2023	Best Adapted Screenplay	All Quiet on the Western Front	Won	
BAFTA Awards	2023	Best Film Not in the English Language	All Quiet on the Western Front	Accepted	
BAFTA Awards	2024	Best Direction	Conclave	Nominated	
BAFTA Awards	2024	Outstanding British Film	Conclave	Won	
Berlin International Film Festival	2014	Golden Bear	Jack	Nominated	
Capri Hollywood International Film Festival	2024	Best Director	Conclave	Won	
Critics' Choice Movie Awards	2024	Best Director	Conclave	Nominated	
Directors Guild of America Awards	2024	Outstanding Director – Feature Film	Conclave	Nominated	
Primetime Emmy Awards	2018	Outstanding Director for a Limited Series or Movie	Patrick Melrose	Nominated	
Golden Globe Awards	2024	Best Director - Motion Picture	Conclave	Nominated	
Grimme Awards	2003	Outstanding Individual Achievement	Schimanski	Nominated	
Grimme Awards	2012	Fiction	A Good Summer	Won	
Grimme Awards	2013	Fiction	Mutter muss weg	Nominated	
Grimme Awards	2016	Fiction - Series/Miniseries	Deutschland 83	Nominated	

Individual recognitions

- 2000: Variety – Award "Ten European Directors To Watch", after Female 2 Seeks Happy End
- 2017: Variety – "Ten European Directors To Watch in 2017"
- 2015: Fellowship for Villa Aurora's artist-in-residence program, along with his wife Nele Mueller-Stöfen
- 2024: A Tribute to... award at the Zurich Film Festival

== See also ==
- List of Swiss Academy Award winners and nominees
