= Fred Breinersdorfer =

German screenwriter

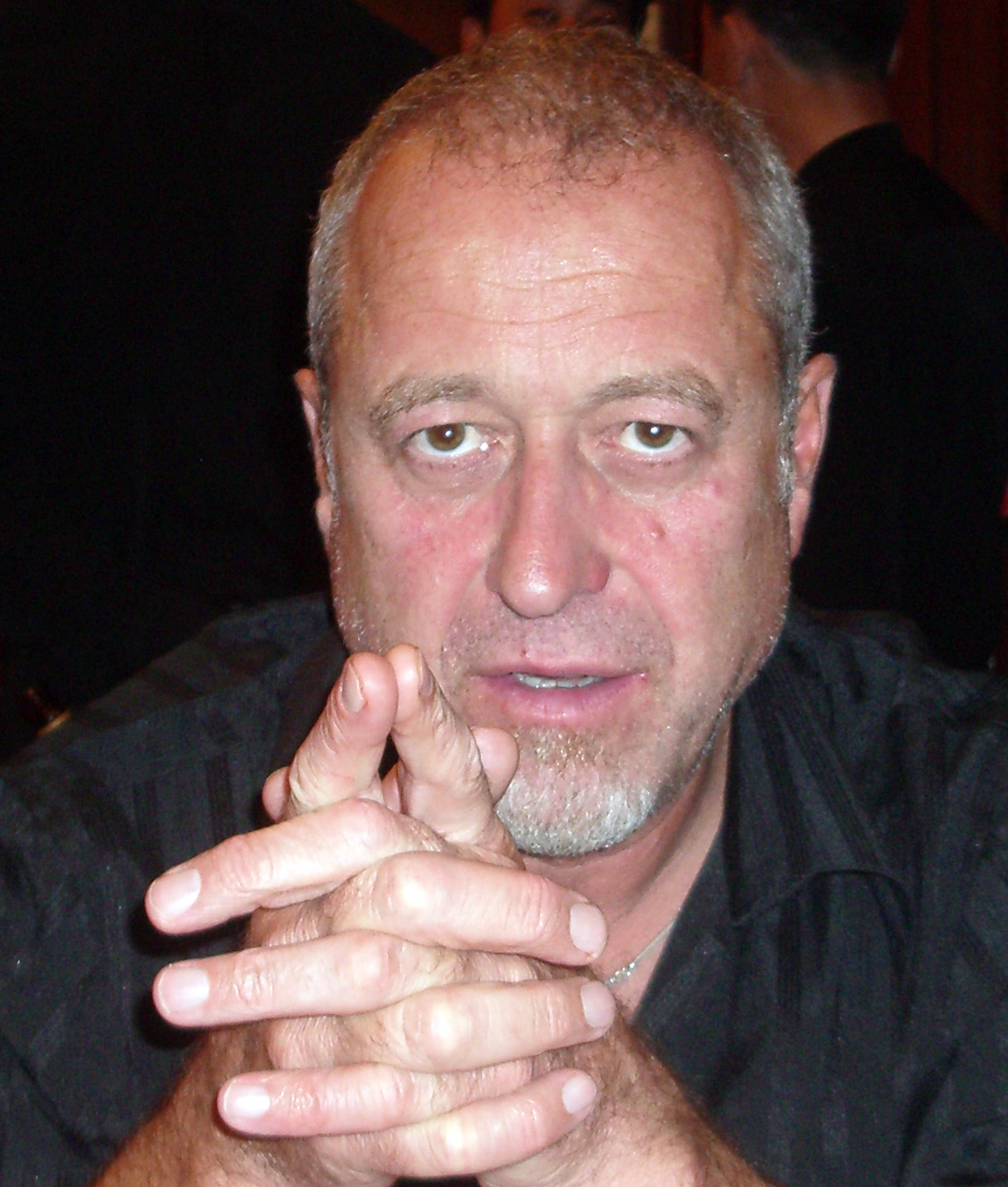
Fred Breinersdorfer

Fred Breinersdorfer is a German screenwriter, lawyer, crime fiction writer, and playwright. He is known for writing the script of the 2006 film Sophie Scholl – The Final Days, about the last days in the life of Sophie Scholl, a member of the student resistance group the White Rose, part of the German Resistance movement. He also wrote the script of the 2015 film Das Tagebuch der Anne Frank (The Diary of Anne Frank).
