= Anna Brüggemann =

German actress and screenwriter (born 1981)

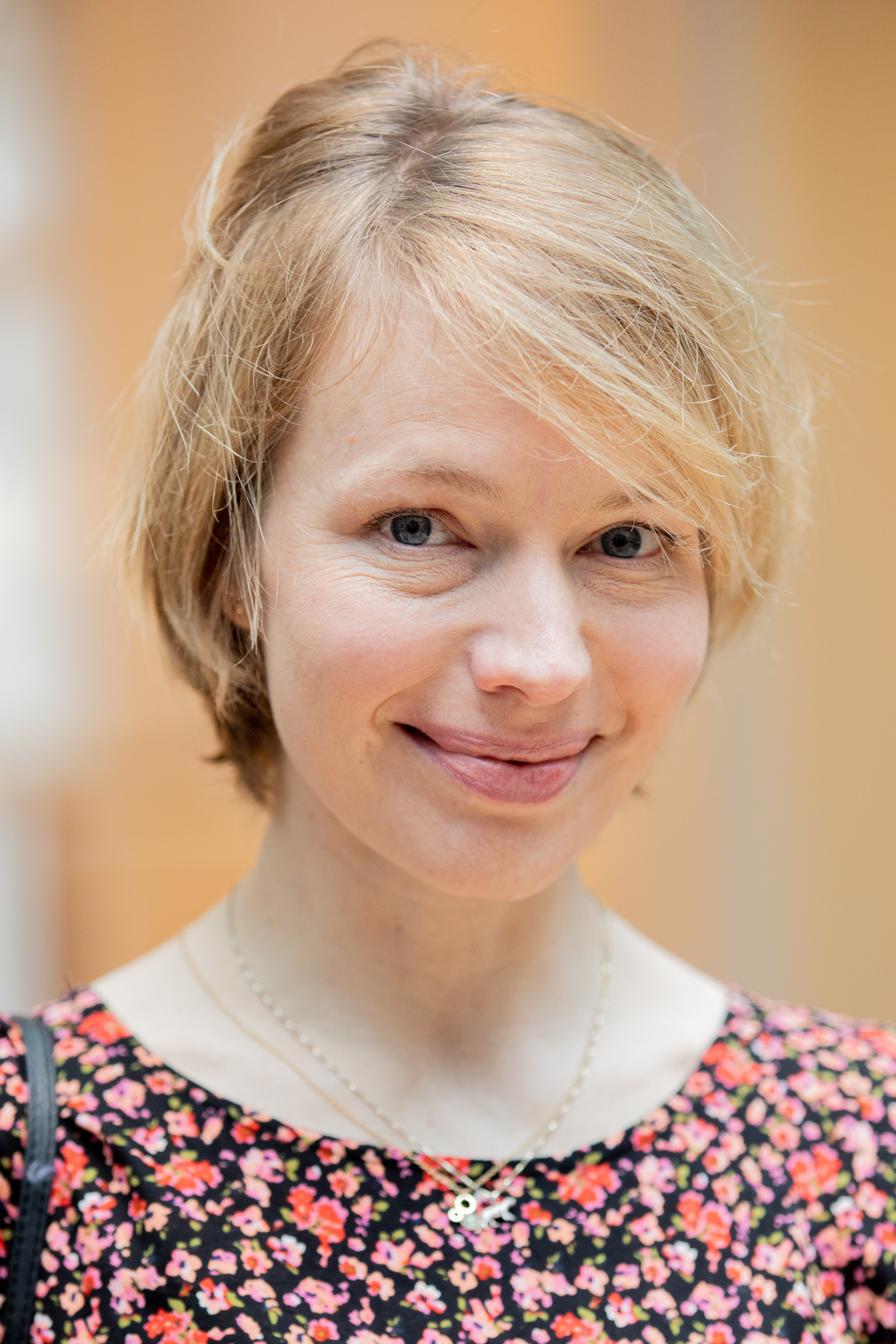
- Anna Brüggemann in 2020
- Born: 24 March 1981 (age 45); Munich, West Germany
- Occupation: Actress
- Years active: 1997–present

Anna Brüggemann (born 24 March 1981) is a German actress and screenwriter. She has appeared in more than sixty films since 1997.

== Selected filmography ==
Year	Title	Role	Notes
2000	Anatomy	Junkie	
2003	Ice Planet	Eleni	
2004	Traffic Affairs	Caroline Thun	
2004	Kleinruppin Forever	Jana	
2005	Oktoberfest	Rena Steininger	
2006	Nine Takes	Magdalena	
2008	Berlin by the Sea	Mavie	
2008	Waiting for Angelina	Julia	
2008	Without You I'm Nothing	Ann	
2009	Lulu and Jimi	Lisa	
2009	Sometime in August	Augustine	
2010	Run If You Can	Annika	also writer
2010	An Intern for Life	Jana Schwarz	
2012	Move	Dina	also writer
2014	Not for Cowards	Doro	TV film
2014	Stations of the Cross	Doctor	also writer
