= Ouběnice =

- Municipality
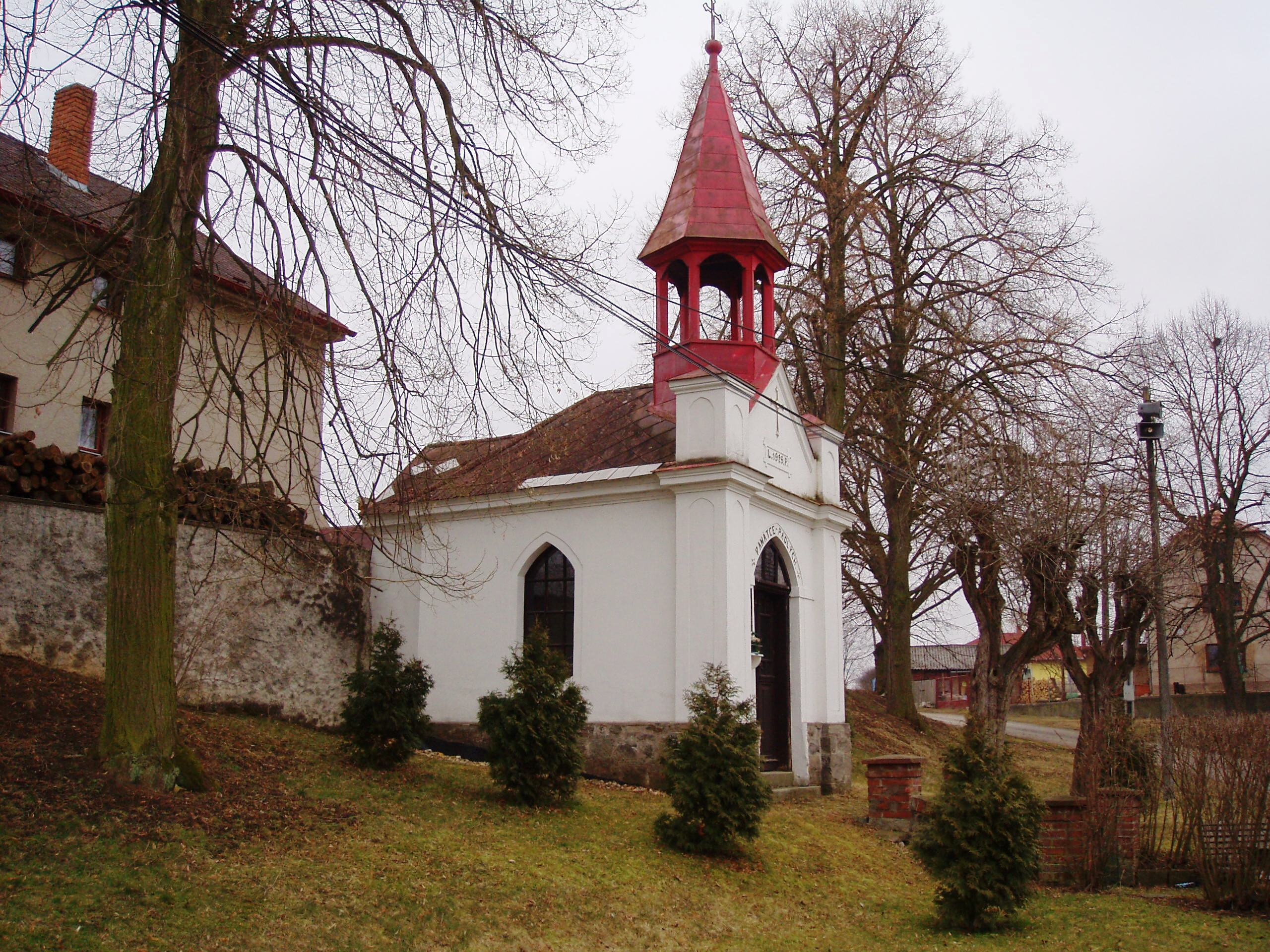
- Chapel of the Virgin Mary

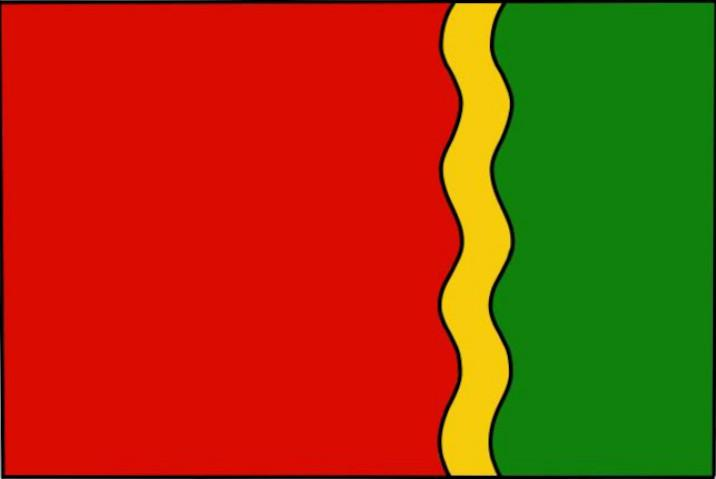
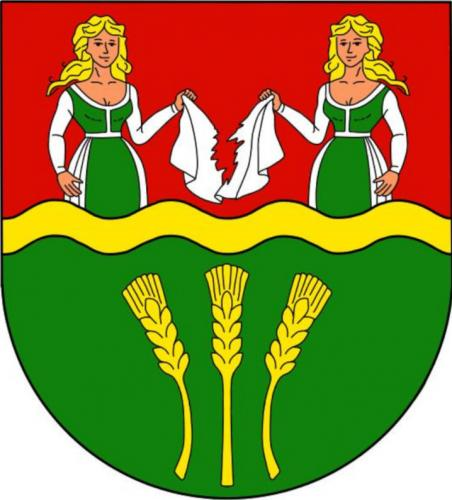
- Flag Coat of arms

- Location in the Czech Republic
- Coordinates: 49°43′4″N 14°9′36″E
- Country: Czech Republic
- Region: Central Bohemian
- District: Příbram
- First mentioned: 1325

Area
  - Total: 4.46 km^{2} (1.72 sq mi)
- Elevation: 395 m (1,296 ft)

Population (2026-01-01)
  - Total: 255
  - Density: 57.2/km^{2} (148/sq mi)
- Time zone: UTC+1 (CET)
  - Summer (DST): UTC+2 (CEST)
- Postal code: 263 01
- Website: www.oubenice.eu

Ouběnice is a municipality and village in Příbram District in the Central Bohemian Region of the Czech Republic. It has about 300 inhabitants.

== Administrative division ==
Ouběnice consists of two municipal parts (in brackets population according to the 2021 census):

- Ouběnice (199)
- Ostrov (35)

== Demographics ==
Historical population
| Year | Pop. | ±% |
|---|---|---|
| 1869 | 351 | — |
| 1880 | 298 | −15.1% |
| 1890 | 328 | +10.1% |
| 1900 | 325 | −0.9% |
| 1910 | 291 | −10.5% |
| 1921 | 295 | +1.4% |
| 1930 | 292 | −1.0% |
| 1950 | 209 | −28.4% |
| 1961 | 230 | +10.0% |
| 1970 | 215 | −6.5% |
| 1980 | 197 | −8.4% |
| 1991 | 172 | −12.7% |
| 2001 | 174 | +1.2% |
| 2011 | 216 | +24.1% |
| 2021 | 234 | +8.3% |
Source: Censuses
