= Dietrich Brüggemann =

German film director

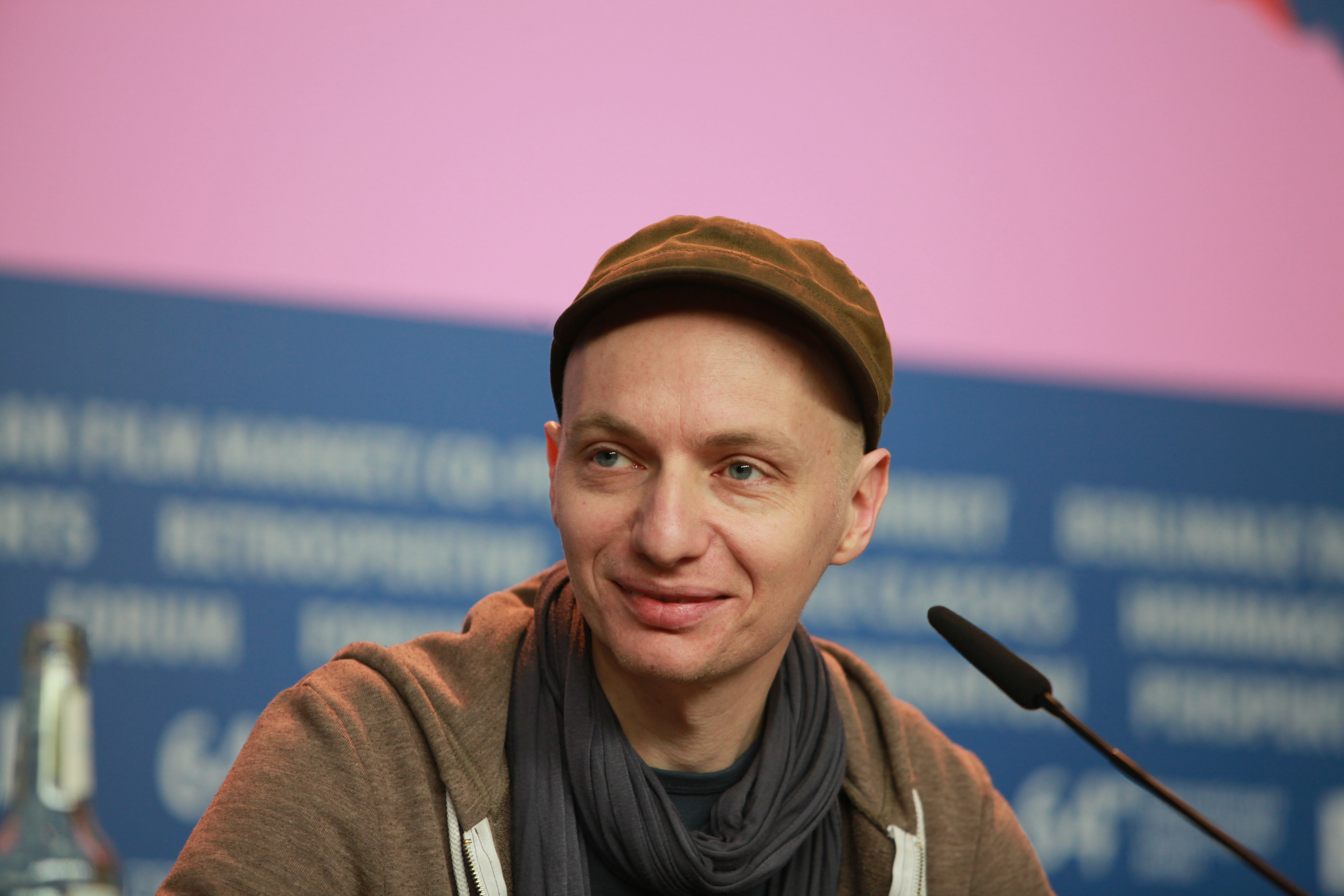
- Born: 23 February 1976 (age 50); Munich, West Germany
- Occupation: Film director

Dietrich Brüggemann (born 23 February 1976) is a German film director screenwriter and musician. He collaborates closely with his sister Anna Brüggemann on several screenplays for his films. They were awarded the Silver Bear for Best Screenplay for Stations of the Cross.

== Selected filmography ==
- Nine Takes (2006)
- Run If You Can (2010)
- Move (2012)
- Stations of the Cross (2014)
- Heil (2015)
- Tatort: Stau (2017, TV series episode)
- Tatort: Murot und das Murmeltier (2019, TV series episode)
