= German Film Award 2015 =

The 65th German Film Award took place on 19 June 2015, organised by the Deutsche Filmakademie. The award ceremony was held at the Palais am Funkturm in Berlin and broadcast by the ZDF. Jan Josef Liefers hosted the event.

== Winners and nominees ==
=== Best Fiction Feature Film ===
Film Prize in Gold: Victoria – Produced by: Sebastian Schipper and Jan Dressler, directed by: Sebastian Schipper
Film Prize in Silver: Jack – Produced by: Jan Krüger and René Römert, directed by: Edward Berger
Film Prize in Bronze: Age of Cannibals – Produced by: Milena Maitz, directed by: Johannes Naber

Labyrinth of Lies – Produced by: Uli Putz, Sabine Lamby and Jakob Claussen, directed by: Giulio Ricciarelli
Who Am I – No System Is Safe – Produced by: Max Wiedemann and Quirin Berg, directed by: Baran bo Odar
We Are Young. We Are Strong. – Produced by: Jochen Laube and Leif Alexis, directed by: Burhan Qurbani

=== Best Documentary Feature Film ===
Citizenfour – Produced by: Dirk Wilutzky, Laura Poitras and Mathilde Bonnefoy, directed by: Laura Poitras

Beyond Punishment – Produced and directed by: Hubertus Siegert
Nowitzki. The Perfect Shot – Produced by: Leopold Hoesch, directed by: Sebastian Dehnhardt

=== Best Children's Feature Film ===
The Pasta Detectives – Produced by: Philipp Budweg and Robert Marciniak, directed by: Neele Vollmar

Fiddlesticks – Produced and directed by: Veit Helmer

=== Best Screenplay ===
Stefan Weigl – Age of Cannibals

Elisabeth Bartel and Giulio Ricciarelli – Labyrinth of Lies
Edward Berger and Nele Mueller-Stöfen – Jack
Baran bo Odar and Jantje Friese – Who Am I – No System Is Safe
Ralf Westhoff – Wir sind die Neuen

=== Best Director ===
Sebastian Schipper – Victoria

Edward Berger – Jack
Dominik Graf – Beloved Sisters
Johannes Naber – Age of Cannibals

=== Best Actress in a Leading Role ===
Laia Costa – Victoria

Nina Hoss – Phoenix
Katharina Marie Schubert – A Godsend

=== Best Actor in a Leading Role ===
Frederick Lau – Victoria

Christian Friedel – 13 Minutes
Hanno Koffler – Tough Love

=== Best Supporting Actress ===
Nina Kunzendorf – Phoenix

Meret Becker – Lügen und andere Wahrheiten
Claudia Messner – Beloved Sisters

=== Best Supporting Actor ===
Joel Basman – We Are Young. We Are Strong.

Burghart Klaußner – 13 Minutes
Gert Voss – Labyrinth of Lies

=== Best Cinematography ===
Sturla Brandth Grøvlen – Victoria

Yoshi Heimrath – We Are Young. We Are Strong.
Judith Kaufmann – 13 Minutes
Nikolaus Summerer – Who Am I – No System Is Safe

=== Best Editing ===
Robert Rzesacz – Who Am I – No System Is Safe

Mathilde Bonnefoy – Citizenfour
Sven Budelmann – Stereo
Alexander Dittner – 13 Minutes
Jörg Hauschild – As We Were Dreaming

=== Best Set Design ===
Silke Buhr – Who Am I – No System Is Safe

Benedikt Herforth and Thomas Stammer – 13 Minutes
Claus Jürgen Pfeiffer – Beloved Sisters

=== Best Costume Design ===
Barbara Grupp – Beloved Sisters

Katrin Aschendorf – The Cut
Bettina Marx – 13 Minutes

=== Best Make Up ===
Nannie Gebhardt-Seele and Tatjana Krauskopf – Beloved Sisters

Tatjana Krauskopf and Isabelle Neu – 13 Minutes
Waldemar Pokromski and Sabine Schumann – The Cut

=== Best Film Music ===
Nils Frahm – Victoria

Alexander Hacke – The Cut
Niki Reiser and Sebastian Pille – Labyrinth of Lies

=== Best Sound Design ===
Bernhard Joest-Däberitz, Florian Beck, Ansgar Frerich and Daniel Weis – Who Am I – No System Is Safe

Frank Kruse, Matthias Lempert and Alexander Buck – Citizenfour
Magnus Pflüger, Fabian Schmidt and Matthias Lempert – Victoria

=== Lifetime Achievement Award ===
Barbara Baum

=== Most Visited Film ===
Honig im Kopf – Produced by: Til Schweiger and Tom Zickler, directed by: Til Schweiger
