= 65th Berlin International Film Festival =

2015 film festival in Berlin, Germany

- Festival poster
- Opening film: Nobody Wants the Night
- Closing film: Taxi
- Location: Berlin, Germany
- Founded: 1951
- Awards: Golden Bear: Taxi
- Hosted by: Anke Engelke
- Festival date: 5–15 February 2015
- Website: http://www.berlinale.de

Berlin International Film Festival chronology
- 66th 64th

The 65th annual Berlin International Film Festival was held from 5 to 15 February 2015, with American film director Darren Aronofsky as the president of the jury. German film director Wim Wenders was presented with the Honorary Golden Bear. The first seven films of the festival were announced on 15 December 2014.

Isabel Coixet's Nobody Wants the Night was the festival's opening film. Iranian docu-drama Taxi, directed by Jafar Panahi, won the Golden Bear, and was the closing film of the festival.

For the first time in 2015, a Berlin Critics' Week ran parallel to the official festival. Similar to Cannes Critics' Week, the section was a sidebar run by the German Film Critics Association dedicated to independent filmmakers.

== Juries ==
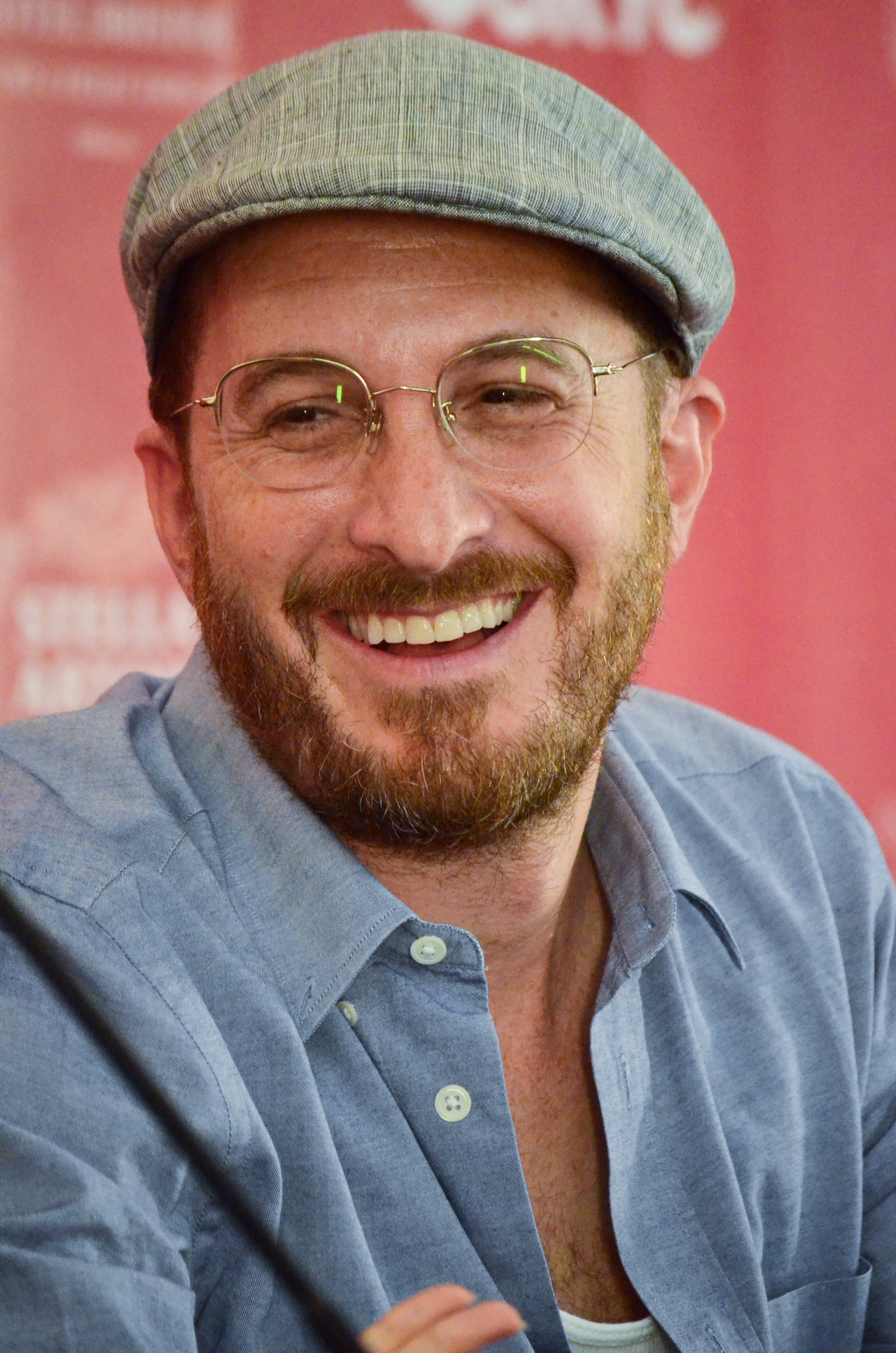
Darren Aronofsky, Jury President

=== Main Competition ===
- Darren Aronofsky, American filmmaker and producer- Jury President
- Daniel Brühl, German actor
- Bong Joon-ho, South Korean director and screenwriter
- Martha De Laurentiis, American film producer
- Claudia Llosa, Peruvian film director, screenwriter and producer
- Audrey Tautou, French actress
- Matthew Weiner, American director, screenwriter and producer

=== First Feature Award ===
- Fernando Eimbcke, Mexican film director and screenwriter
- Olga Kurylenko, Ukrainian actress
- Joshua Oppenheimer, American film director

=== Short Film Competition ===
The following people were on the jury for the Best Short Film:

- Halil Altındere, Turkish artist (Turkey)
- Madhusree Dutta, Indian director, curator and author (India)
- Wahyuni A. Hadi, Singaporean author and curator
Main Competition jury members

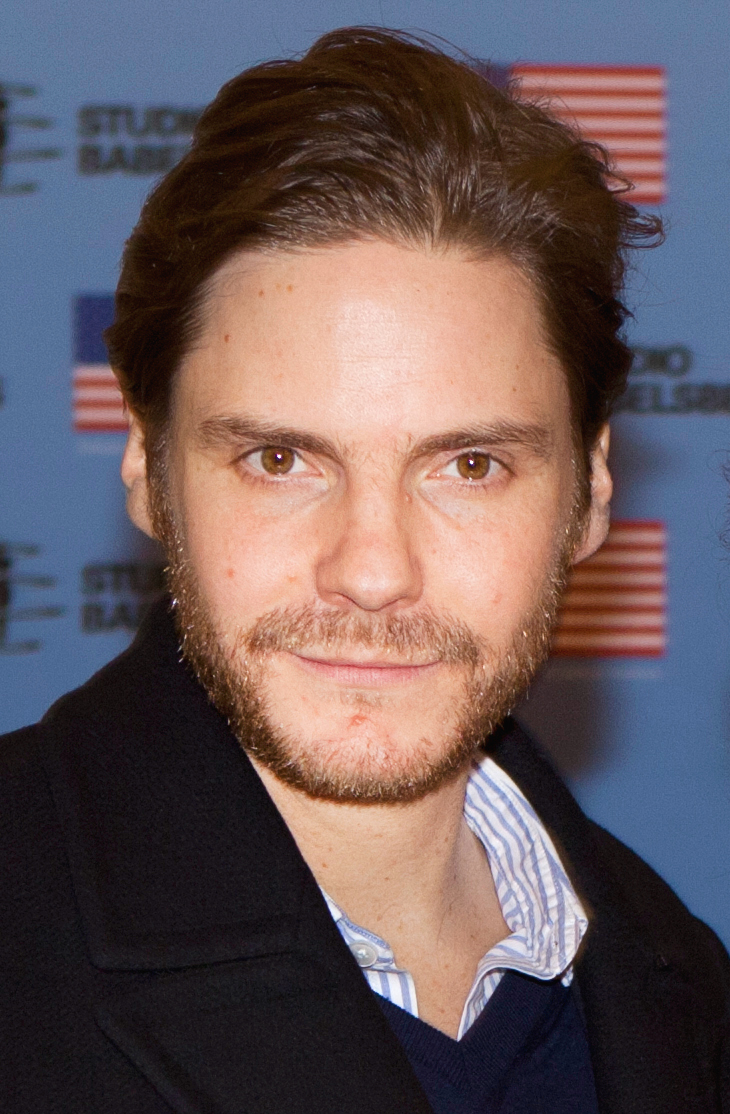
Daniel Brühl

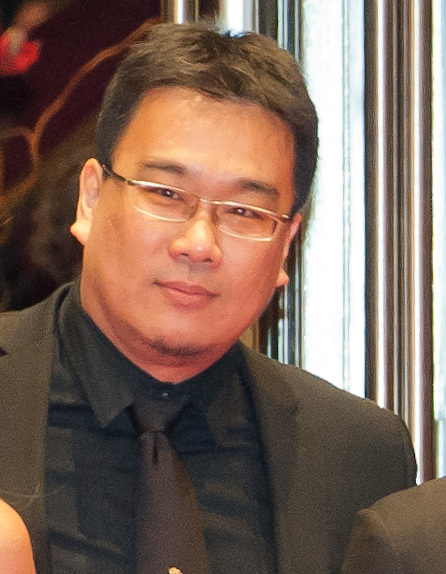
Bong Joon-ho

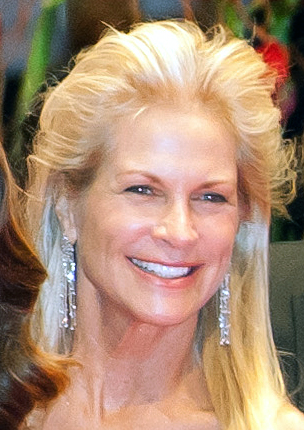
M. De Laurentiis

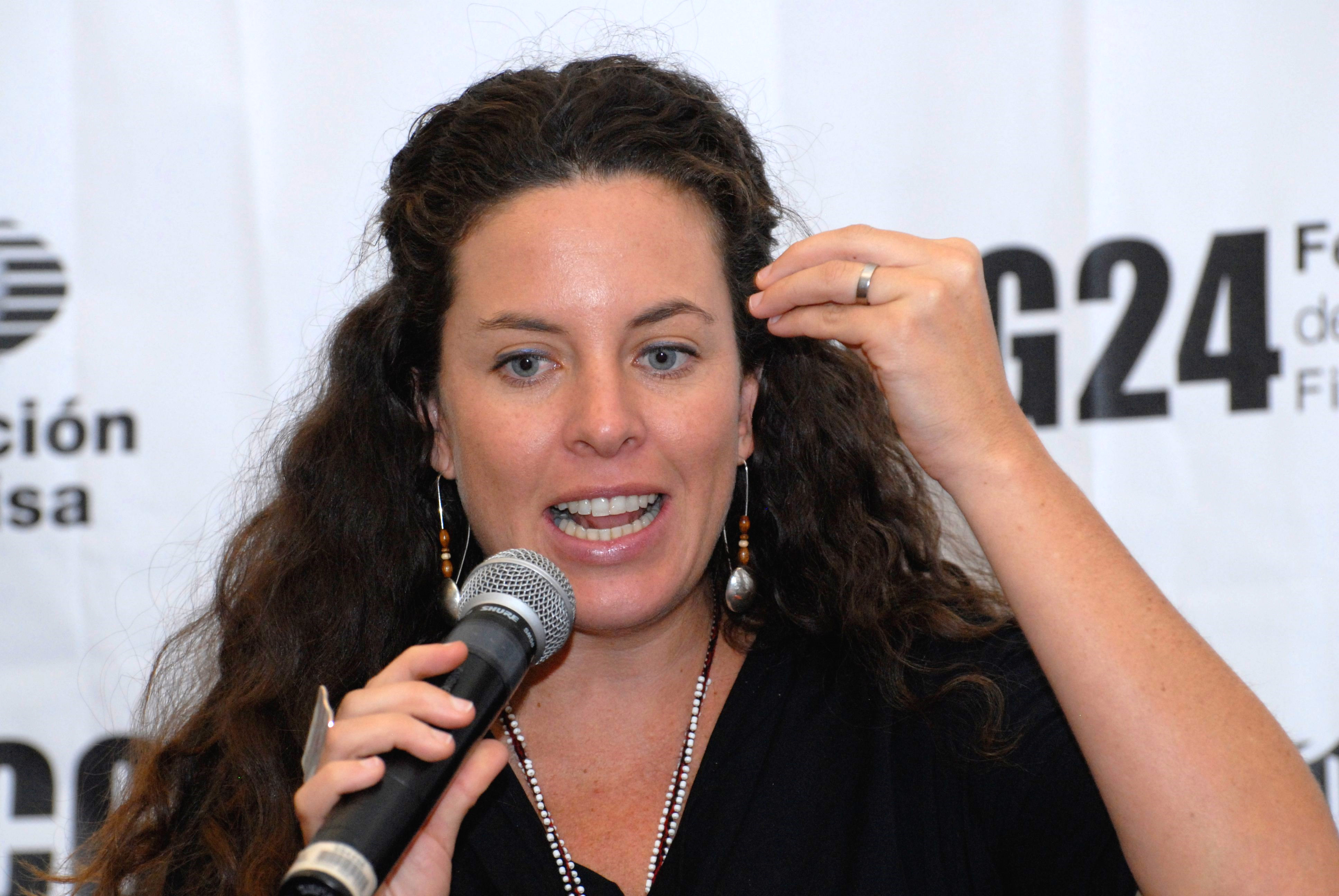
Claudia Llosa

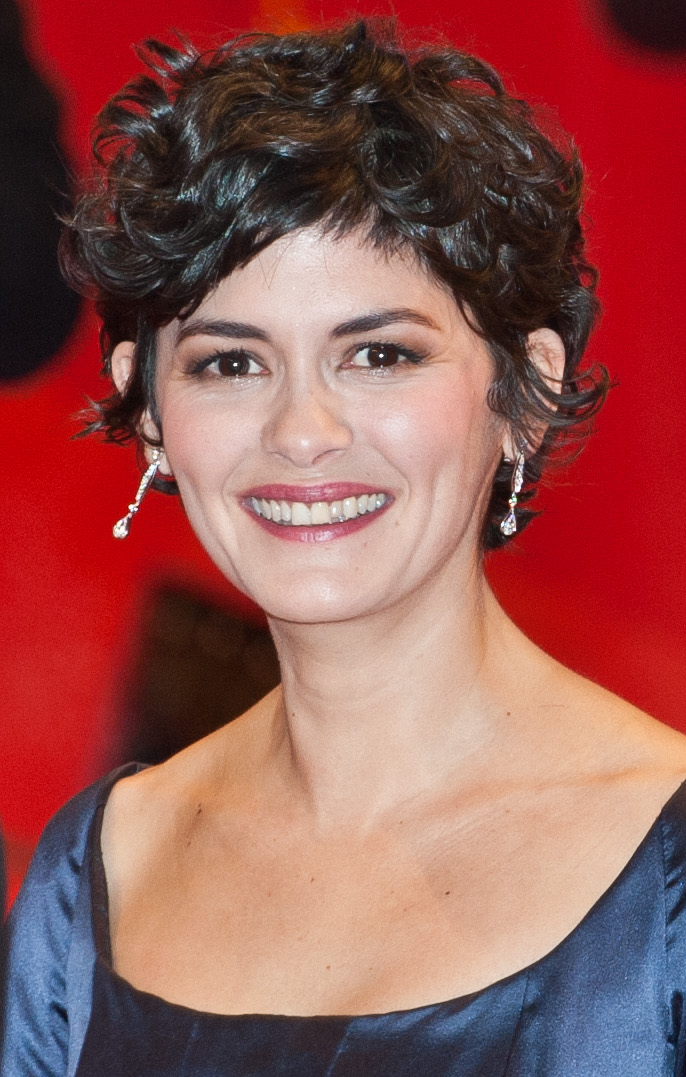
Audrey Tautou

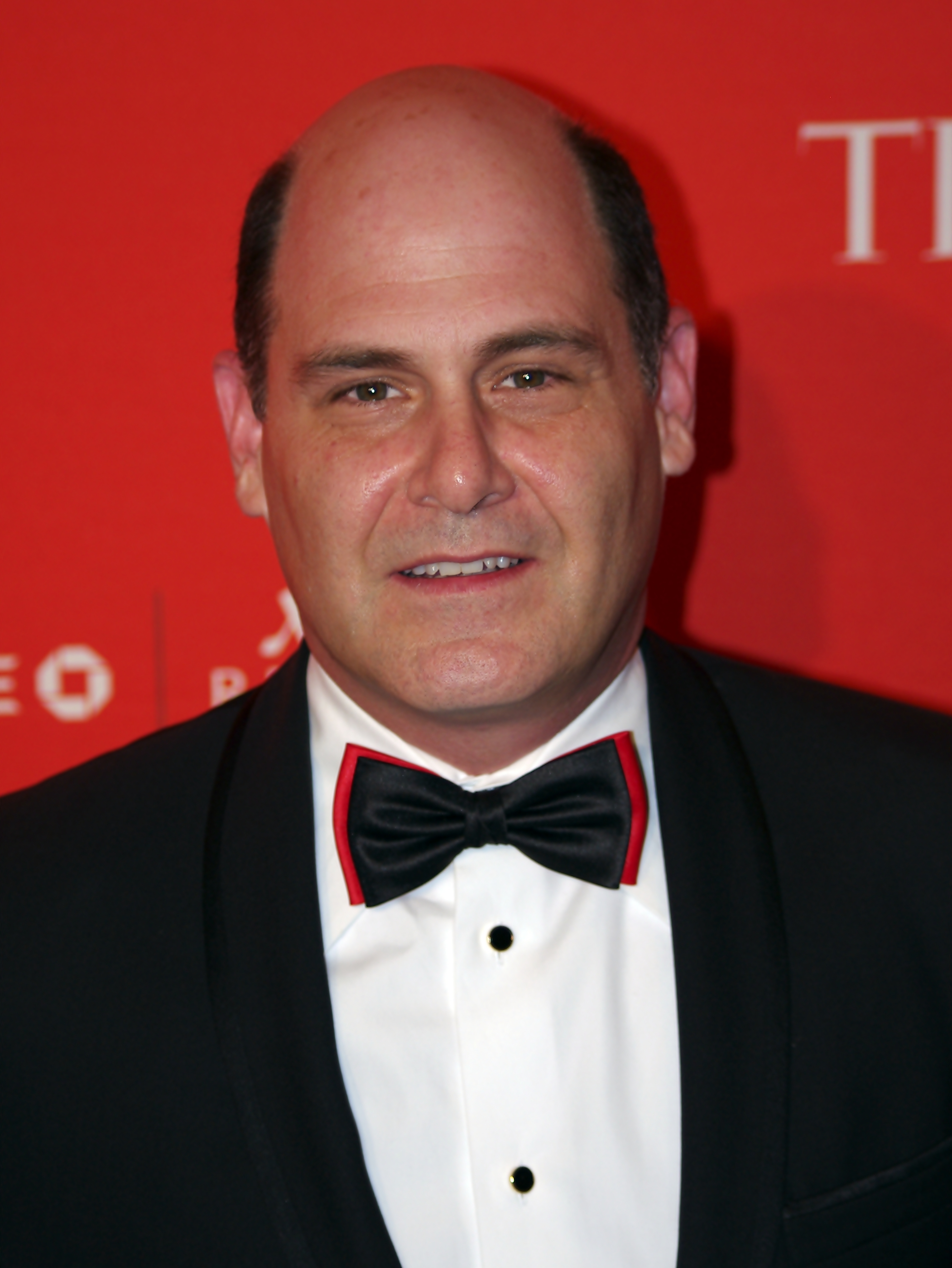
Matthew Weiner

== Official Sections ==
=== Main Competition ===
The following films were selected for the main competition for the Golden Bear and Silver Bear awards:

English title	Original title	Director(s)	Production country
45 Years		Andrew Haigh	United Kingdom
Aferim!		Radu Jude	Romania, Bulgaria, Czech Republic
As We Were Dreaming	Als wir träumten	Andreas Dresen	Germany, France
Big Father, Small Father and Other Stories	Cha và con và	Phan Đăng Di	Vietnam
Body	Ciało	Małgorzata Szumowska	Poland
Chasuke's Journey	天の茶助	Sabu	Japan
Diary of a Chambermaid	Journal d'une femme de chambre	Benoît Jacquot	Belgium, France
Eisenstein in Guanajuato		Peter Greenaway	Netherlands, Mexico, Belgium, Finland
Gone with the Bullets	一步之遥	Jiang Wen	China
Ixcanul		Jayro Bustamante	Guatemala, France
Knight of Cups		Terrence Malick	United States
Nobody Wants the Night	Nadie quiere la noche	Isabel Coixet	Spain, France, Bulgaria
Queen of the Desert		Werner Herzog	United States, Morocco
Sworn Virgin	Vergine giurata	Laura Bispuri	Italy, Switzerland, Germany, Albania, Kosovo
Taxi	تاکسی	Jafar Panahi	Iran
The Club	El Club	Pablo Larraín	Chile
The Pearl Button	El botón de nácar	Patricio Guzmán	France, Chile, Spain
Under Electric Clouds	Под электрическими облаками	Aleksei Alekseivich German	Russia, Ukraine, Poland
Victoria		Sebastian Schipper	Germany

=== Out of competition ===
The following films were selected to be screened out of competition:

English title	Original title	Director(s)	Production country
13 Minutes	Elser	Oliver Hirschbiegel	Germany
Cinderella		Kenneth Branagh	United States
Every Thing Will Be Fine		Wim Wenders	Germany, Canada, France, Sweden, Norway
Mr. Holmes		Bill Condon	United Kingdom, United States

=== Panorama ===
The following films were selected for the Panorama section:

English title	Original title	Director(s)	Production country
54 (director's cut)		Mark Christopher	United States
600 Miles	600 Millas	Gabriel Ripstein	Mexico
Absence	Ausência	Chico Teixeira	Brazil, Chile, France
Angelica		Mitchell Lichtenstein	United States
Bizarre		Étienne Faure	France, United States
Blue Blood	Sangue azul	Lírio Ferreira	Brazil
The Blue Hour	Onthakan	Anucha Boonyawatana	Thailand
Butterfly	Mariposa	Marco Berger	Argentina
Chorus		François Delisle	Canada
Dora or the Sexual Neuroses of Our Parents	Dora oder Die sexuellen Neurosen unserer Eltern	Stina Werenfels	Switzerland, Germany
Dyke Hard		Bitte Andersson	Sweden
The Fire	El incendio	Juan Schnitman	Argentina
How to Win at Checkers (Every Time)		Josh Kim	Thailand, United States, Indonesia
I Am Michael		Justin Kelly	United States
The Last Summer of the Rich	Der letzte Sommer der Reichen	Peter Kern	Austria
Love, Theft and Other Entanglements	الحب والسرقة ومشاكل أخرى	Muayad Alayan	Palestine
A Minor Leap Down	پریدن از ارتفاع کم	Hamed Rajabi	Iran, France
Murder in Pacot	Meurtre à Pacot	Raoul Peck	France, Haiti, Norway
Nasty Baby		Sebastián Silva	United States
Necktie Youth		Sibs Shongwe-La Mer	South Africa
Ned Rifle		Hal Hartley	United States
Ode to My Father	국제시장	Yoon Je-kyoon	South Korea
Out of My Hand		Takeshi Fukunaga	United States
Out of Nature	Mot naturen	Ole Giæver, Marte Vold	Norway
Paradise in Service	軍中樂園	Doze Niu	Taiwan
Petting Zoo		Micah Magee	Germany, Greece, United States
Pioneer Heroes	Pionery-geroi	Natalia Kudryashova	Russia
The Sea Is Behind	البحر من ورائكم	Hisham Lasri	Morocco
The Second Mother	Que Horas Ela Volta?	Anna Muylaert	Brazil
Stories of Our Lives		Jim Chuchu	Kenya
The Summer of Sangailė	Sangailė	Alantė Kavaitė	Lithuania, France, Netherlands
Thanatos, Drunk	醉·生夢死	Chang Tso-Chi	Taiwan
Tough Love	Härte	Rosa von Praunheim	Germany
Why Me?	De ce eu?	Tudor Giurgiu	Romania, Bulgaria, Hungary

=== Perspektive Deutsches Kino ===
The following films are selected for the Perspektive Deutsches Kino (lit. 'Perspective on German Cinema') section:

- The Bunker by Nikias Chryssos
- A Perfect Place by Anatol Schuster
- Elixir by Brodie Higgs
- Hakie – Haki. Living as a Man by Anabela Angelovska
- Sex: Speak by Saskia Walker, Ralf Hechelmann
- Stubborn Boy by Moritz Krämerwith Ceci Chuh, Niels Braun, Monika Wiedemer
- Summer Downstairs by Tom Sommerlatte
- Tell Me Mnemosyne by Lisa Sperling
- Unoccupied by Filippa Bauer

=== Forum ===
The following films were selected for the Forum section:

- Abaabi ba boda boda (The Boda Boda Thieves) by Yes! That's Us
- Al-wadi (The Valley) by Ghassan Salhab
- Balikbayan #1 (Memories of Overdevelopment Redux) by Kidlat Tahimik
- Beira-Mar (Seashore) by Filipe Matzembacher, Marcio Reolon
- Ben Zaken by Efrat Corem
- Brasil S/A (Brazilian Dream) by Marcelo Pedroso
- Ce gigantesque retournement de la terre (This Gigantic Furrowing of the Ground) by Claire Angelini
- Chaiki (The Gulls) by Ella Manzheeva
- Cheol won gi haeng (End of Winter) by Kim Dae-hwan
- Counting by Jem Cohen
- Dari Marusan by Izumi Takahashi
- The Days Run Away Like Wild Horses Over the Hills by Marcin Malaszczak
- Le dos rouge (Portrait of the Artist) by Antoine Barraud
- Exotica, Erotica, Etc. by Evangelia Kranioti
- Flotel Europa by Vladimir Tomic
- The Forbidden Room by Guy Maddin, Evan Johnson
- Freie Zeiten (After Work) by Janina Herhoffer
- Futaba kara toku hanarete dainibu (Nuclear Nation II) by Atsushi Funahashi
- Der Geldkomplex (The Money Complex) by Juan Rodriganez
- Il gesto delle mani (Hand Gestures) by Francesco Clerici
- H. by Rania Attieh, Daniel Garcia
- Hedi Schneider steckt fest (Hedi Schneider is Stuck) by Sonja Heiss
- Histoire de Judas (The Story of Judas) by Rabah Ameur-Zaïmeche
- Hotline by Silvina Landsmann
- K by Emyr ap Richard, Darhad Erdenibulag
- Koza by Ivan Ostrochovský
- Madare ghalb atomi (Atom Heart Mother) by Ali Ahmadzadeh
- La maldad (Evilness) by Joshua Gil
- Mar by Dominga Sotomayor
- Mizu no koe o kiku (The Voice of Water) by Masashi Yamamoto
- La mujer de barro (The Mud Woman) by Sergio Castro San Martín
- Nefesim kesilene kadar (Until I Lose My Breath) by Emine Emel Balc?
- La nuit et l'enfant (The Night and the Kid) by David Yon
- Queen of Earth by Alex Ross Perry
- Rabo de Peixe (Fish Tail) by Joaquim Pinto, Nuno Leonel
- La sirene de Faso Fani (The Siren of Faso Fani) by Michel K. Zongo
- Suenan los androides (Androids Dream) by Ion de Sosa
- Superwelt (Superworld) by Karl Markovics
- Thamaniat wa ushrun laylan wa bayt min al-sheir (Twenty-Eight Nights and A Poem) by Akram Zaatari
- Uber die Jahre (Over the Years) by Nikolaus Geyrhalter
- Viaggio nella dopo-storia (Journey into Post-History) by Vincent Dieutre
- Violencia (Violence) by Jorge Forero
- Zurich by Sacha Polak

=== Berlinale Special ===
The following films were selected for the Berlinale Special section:

English title	Original title	Director(s)	Production country
Are You Here	Are You Here	Matthew Weiner	United States
Bloodline		Todd A. Kessler, Daniel Zelman, and Glenn Kessler	United States
La Bohème	Breathe Umphefumlo	Mark Dornford-May	South Africa
Fifty Shades of Grey		Sam Taylor-Johnson	United States
Greenery Will Bloom Again	Torneranno i prati	Ermanno Olmi	Italy
Life		Anton Corbijn	United Kingdom, Canada
The Look of Silence		Joshua Oppenheimer	Denmark, Norway, Finland, United Kingdom, Indonesia
Love and Mercy		Bill Pohlad	United States
The Misplaced World	Die abhandene Welt	Margarethe von Trotta	Germany
Selma		Ava DuVernay	United Kingdom, United States
The Seventh Fire		Jack Pettibone Riccobono	United States
Virgin Mountain	Fúsi	Dagur Kári	Iceland, Denmark
Woman in Gold		Simon Curtis	United Kingdom, United States

=== Berlinale Classics ===
The following films were selected to be screened in the Berlinale Classics section:

English title	Original title	Director(s)	Production country
Born in '45 (1966)	Jahrgang 45	Jürgen Böttcher	East Germany
The Cat Has Nine Lives (1968)	Neun Leben hat die Katze	Ula Stöckl	West Germany
Goldfinger (1964)	Goldfinger	Guy Hamilton	United Kingdom
In Cold Blood (1967)	In Cold Blood	Richard Brooks	United States
Variety (1925)	Varieté	Ewald André Dupont	Germany

=== Berlinale Series ===
The Series section, devoted to long-form television series, was introduced in 2015. Better Call Saul had its premiere at the Berlinale.

== Official Awards ==
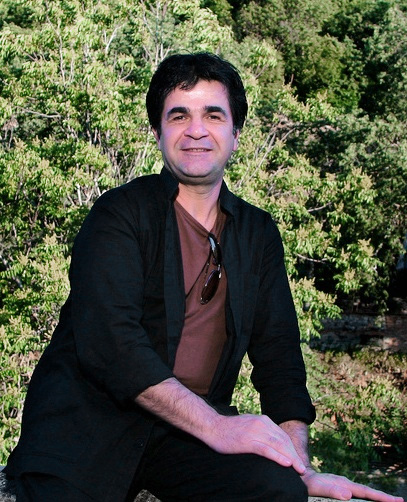
The Golden Bear of 2015 was awarded to Taxi by Iranian director Jafar Panahi.

The following prizes were awarded:

=== Main Competition ===
- Golden Bear: Taxi by Jafar Panahi
- Silver Bear Grand Jury Prize: The Club by Pablo Larraín
- Alfred Bauer Prize: Ixcanul by Jayro Bustamante
- Silver Bear for Best Director:
  - Radu Jude for Aferim!
  - Małgorzata Szumowska for Body
- Silver Bear for Best Actress: Charlotte Rampling for 45 Years
- Silver Bear for Best Actor: Tom Courtenay for 45 Years
- Silver Bear for Best Screenplay: Patricio Guzmán for The Pearl Button
- Silver Bear for Outstanding Artistic Contribution: (cinematography)
  - Sturla Brandth Grøvlen for Victoria
  - Sergey Mikhalchuk and Evgeniy Privin for Under Electric Clouds

=== Best First Feature Award ===
- 600 Miles by Gabriel Ripstein

=== Panorama ===
- Audience Award:
  - 1st Place: The Second Mother by Anna Muylaert
  - 2nd Place: Stories of Our Lives by Jim Chuchu
  - 3rd Place: Tough Love by Rosa von Praunheim

=== Generation ===
- Rainbow by Nagesh Kukunoor

== Independent Awards ==
=== Teddy Award ===
- Nasty Baby by Sebastián Silva

=== FIPRESCI Prize ===
- Competition: Taxi by Jafar Panahi
- Panorama: A Minor Leap Down by Hamed Rajabi

== Festival appearance ==
The festival poster was designed by BOROS agency, who made the previous four posters of the festival. Festival director Dieter Kosslick described the poster as "the glamorous and suspense-packed second that precedes every cinema experience is when the curtain opens to reveal the screen. This year's poster motif aims to stir anticipation for that magical moment".
