= The 11th Hour (2014 film) =

2014 film

- Theatrical release poster
- Directed by: Anders Morgenthaler
- Written by: Anders Morgenthaler
- Produced by: Marie Cecilie Gade; Julie Lind-Holm
- Starring: Kim Basinger; Jordan Prentice
- Cinematography: Sturla Brandth Grøvlen
- Edited by: Olivia Neergaard-Holm
- Music by: Jóhann Jóhannsson
- Production company: Zentropa
- Distributed by: TrustNordisk (DE, DK)
- Release date: September 30, 2014 (Hamburg)
- Running time: 97 minutes
- Countries: Germany; Denmark
- Language: English

The 11th Hour (also known as I Am Here) is a 2014 drama film directed and written by Anders Morgenthaler and starring Kim Basinger and Jordan Prentice. The film was released on VOD.

== Plot ==
Hamburg-based businesswoman Maria, in her 40s, has achieved everything in her job and is married, but her being childless makes her unhappy. After another miscarriage, she learns that she will never be a mother of her life because of her age. Maria decides to check a rumor that prostitutes in Eastern Europe may sell their newborns for money. In search of a woman who could sell her a baby, Maria gets deeper and deeper into the dark world of prostitution and human trafficking. Soon, she faces serious problems as she is confronted by a brutal Russian criminal.

== Cast ==
- Kim Basinger as Maria
- Jordan Prentice as Petit
- Sebastian Schipper as Peter
- Peter Stormare as The Russian

== Reception ==
=== Critical response ===
On the review aggregator website Rotten Tomatoes, 13% of 15 critics' reviews are positive, with an average rating of 3.4/10. Metacritic, which uses a weighted average, assigned the film a score of 32 out of 100, based on nine critics, indicating "generally unfavorable" reviews. IndieWire felt that Kim Basinger "does what she can with [The 11th Hour] material, but that's not much".
