= Sturla Brandth Grøvlen =

Norwegian cinematographer (born 1980)

- Born: 11 March 1980 (age 46); Trondheim, Norway
- Education: Lillehammer University College; European Film College; Bergen Academy of Art and Design; National Film School of Denmark
- Occupation: Cinematographer
- Years active: 2007–present

Sturla Brandth Grøvlen (born 11 March 1980) is a Norwegian cinematographer, who lives and works in Denmark. For his work on Victoria (2015), Grøvlen won a Silver Bear for Outstanding Artistic Contribution for Cinematography at the 65th Berlin International Film Festival.

== Early life and education ==
Grøvlen grew up in the Kattem and Lundåsen neighbourhoods of Trondheim, Norway. He studied film history and film theory at Lillehammer University College from 2000 to 2001. He then studied at European Film College in Ebeltoft from 2001 to 2002. He studied photography at Bergen Academy of Art and Design from 2003 to 2006, receiving a Bachelor of Fine Arts degree. Between 2007 and 2011, he studied film at the National Film School of Denmark in Copenhagen.

== Career ==
Until 2013, Grøvlen spelled his middle name Brandt.

Grøvlen was cinematographer on Anders Morgenthaler's drama The 11th Hour (2014), starring Kim Basinger and Sebastian Schipper. Grøvlen then completed the cinematography on Schipper's film Victoria (2015). The film was screened in the main competition section of the 65th Berlin International Film Festival where Grøvlen won a Silver Bear for Outstanding Artistic Contribution for Cinematography. The film has a 140-minute runtime and was shot in a single continuous take, without cuts. Victoria was Grøvlen's second feature film as a cinematographer. He was also a cinematographer on the Icelandic film Hrútar, which premiered in 2015 and won the audience award at the Tromsø International Film Festival in 2016. He was also the cinematographer on the Danish film Another Round (2020), directed by Thomas Vinterberg. Another Round was awarded the Academy Award for Best International Feature Film and the BAFTA Award for Best Film Not in the English Language.

In January 2021, he was awarded the Liv Ullmann Prize for his efforts as a leading cinematographer in both Nordic and international film.

== Personal life ==
Grøvlen lives and works in Copenhagen. In addition to his mother tongue of Norwegian, he is fluent in Danish and English.

== Filmography ==
Key
†	Denotes films that have not yet been released

=== Film ===
Year	Title	Director	Notes
2014	The Agreement	Karen Stokkendal Poulsen	Documentary
2014	The 11th Hour	Anders Morgenthaler	
2015	Victoria	Sebastian Schipper	
2015	Rams	Grímur Hákonarson	
2015	Home Sweet Home	Katrine Philp	Television documentary
2016	Shelley	Ali Abbasi	
2016	Heartstone	Guðmundur Arnar Guðmundsson	
2017	The Discovery	Charlie McDowell	
2018	Before the Frost	Michael Noer	
2019	On the Inside of a Military Dictatorship	Karen Stokkendal Poulsen	Documentary
2020	Shirley	Josephine Decker	
2020	Wendy	Benh Zeitlin	Director of photography
2020	Last and First Men	Jóhann Jóhannsson	
2020	Another Round	Thomas Vinterberg	
2021	The Innocents	Eskil Vogt	
2022	Beautiful Beings	Guðmundur Arnar Guðmundsson	
2022	War Sailor	Gunnar Vikene	
2024	Life and Other Problems	Max Kestner	
2024	The Summer Book	Charlie McDowell	

==== Short films ====
Year	Title	Director	Notes
2007	Unsee	David Earle	
2009	Skabeloner	Nadim Carlsen and Sturla B. Grøvlen	
2009	Lille Drage	Asger Krøjer Kallesøe	
2009	The Gentlemen	Janus Bragi Jakobsson	Documentary
2010	In Darkness There Is Light	Ali Abbasi	
2010	Stefan	Andreas Thaulow	
2010	Venus	Tor Fruergaard	
2011	Deleted Scene (From an Imaginary Film)	David B Earle	
2011	Underneath the Dark	Anita Mathal Hopland	Documentary
2011	Karim	Ulaano Salim	Director of photography
2011	M for Markus	Ali Abbasi	
2011	Før stormen	Andreas Thaulow	
2012	Touch of Magic	Tobias Gundorff Boesen	Director of photography
2012	My Tokyo Fairytale	Marie Limkilde	Documentary
2012	Ung for evigt	Ulaano Salim	
2012	Turbo	Andreas Thaulow	
2013	A Doll's House	Tobias Gundorff Boesen	
2013	Et Dukkehjem	Tobias Gundorff Boesen	
2014	Lubich & Davidsen	Sara Lubich	
2014	Ártún	Guðmundur Arnar Guðmundsson	
2015	Riders	Jesper Vidkjær	Director of photography
2016	Pistol	Andreas Thaulow	
2018	Kina	Tobias Gundorff Boesen	

=== Television series ===
Year	Title	Director	Notes
2014	Kødkataloget	Tea Lindeburg	6 episodes
2015	Kunstnerens Lærling	Anders Morgenthaler	
2023	War Sailor	Gunnar Vikene	Netflix re-release
2024	Families like Ours	Thomas Vinterberg	7 episodes

=== Music videos ===
Year	Title	Artist	Director
2011	"A Dark God Heart"	Sleep Party People	Marie Limkilde
2011	"Red Swan"	The Mob	Milad Alami
2011	"Sensation"	PowerSolo	Tor Fruergaard
2011	"Farligt"	F.U.K.T	Lars Halvorsen and Heine Kaarsberg
2012	"Dance"	Rebecca & Fiona	Lærke Herthoni
2013	"On the Ropes (Out of Line)"	The Floor Is Made of Lava	Marie Limkilde
2013	"Are We Lovers"	Silver 6	Christian Eaglecastle
2016	"Go Robot"	Red Hot Chili Peppers	Thoranna Sigurdardottir

== Awards and honours ==
- 2015: Silver Bear for Outstanding Artistic Contribution for Cinematography for Victoria by Sebastian Schipper (tied with Evgeniy Privin and Serhiy Mykhalchuk for Under Electric Clouds)
- 2015: Best Cinematography for Victoria in the 65th ceremony of the German Film Awards.
- 2023: American Society of Cinematographers Spotlight Award for War Sailor
