= Katy Karrenbauer =

German actress (born 1962)

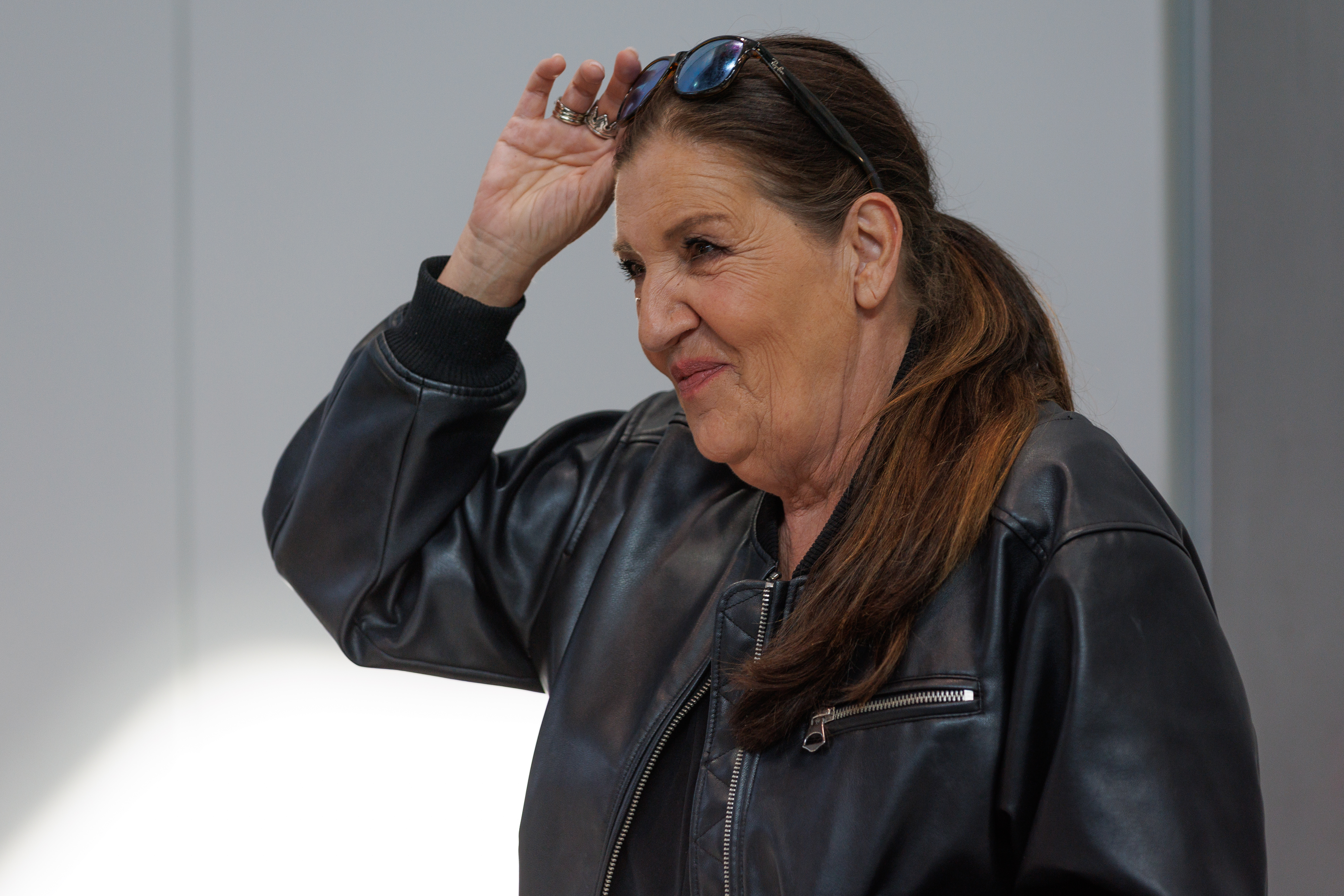
- Karrenbauer in 2025
- Born: Katy Nina Karrenbauer; 31 December 1962 (age 63); Duisburg, Germany
- Occupations: Actress; Dubbing actress; Singer; Author
- Years active: 1997–present

Katy Nina Karrenbauer (born 31 December 1962) is a German actress, dubbing actress, singer, and author. She is known for her role as Christine Walter in the drama series Hinter Gittern – Der Frauenknast. In 2015 she received a special award from the German Film Academy for her role in Rosa von Praunheim's film Tough Love.

== Filmography ==
- 1997: Das erste Semester
- 1999: Late Show
- 2000: Criminal Sorrow Waltz
- 2000: Musik hat ihn kaputt gemacht
- 2001: Westend
- 2002: Wie die Karnickel
- 2005: Max und Moritz Reloaded
- 2006: 7 Zwerge – Der Wald ist nicht genug
- 2007: Nothing Else Matters
- 2008: Wachgeküsst in Stuttgart
- 2011: Gegengerade
- 2012: Zettl
- 2012: Cloud Atlas
- 2015: Tough Love
- 2015: Kartoffelsalat – Nicht fragen!
- 2019: Under ConTroll

=== Television films ===
- 2001: Love Letters – Liebe per Nachnahme
- 2001: Todeslust
- 2002: Vanessa Kramer und der rote Skorpion
- 2002: Crazy Race
- 2002: Pest – Die Rückkehr
- 2004: Crazy Race 2 – Warum die Mauer wirklich fiel
- 2004: Shark Attack in the Mediterranean
- 2006: Die ProSieben Märchenstunde: Rapunzel oder Mord ist ihr Hobby
- 2006: Crazy Race 3 – Sie knacken jedes Schloss
- 2007: African Race – Die verrückte Jagd nach dem Marakunda
- 2007: Was am Ende zählt
- 2008: ProSieben Funny Movie: Spiel mir das Lied und du bist tot!
- 2008: Putzfrau Undercover
- 2010: C.I.S. – Chaoten im Sondereinsatz
- 2013: Lotta & die frohe Zukunft
- 2013: Plastic – Schönheit hat ihren Preis

=== Series ===
- 1994: Notaufnahme (Casualty) (13 episodes)
- 1995: Alphateam – Die Lebensretter im OP
- 1995: SK Kölsch
- 1995,1997, 2008: Verbotene Liebe (13 episodes)
- 1995, 2002: Balko
- 1996: SK-Babies
- 1996: Das Amt
- 1997: Nikola
- 1997, 1999: Die Wache
- 1997–2007: Hinter Gittern – Der Frauenknast
- 1998: Gute Zeiten, schlechte Zeiten
- 1999: Anke
- 2004: Doppelter Einsatz: Kidnapping
- 2004: Schillerstraße
- 2005: Alarm für Cobra 11 – Die Autobahnpolizei: Unter Feuer
- 2004: Bernds Hexe
- 2007: Notruf Hafenkante: Spiel des Lebens
- 2007, 2009: In aller Freundschaft (2 episodes)
- 2008: Plötzlich Papa – Einspruch abgelehnt!
- 2010: Anna und die Liebe
- 2011: Der letzte Bulle: Camping für Anfänger
- 2011: Cindy aus Marzahn und die jungen Wilden
- 2011: Glee (Season 2, german voice of Shannon Beiste)
- 2011: Löwenzahn
- 2012: X-Diaries
- 2013: Stuttgart Homicide: Verschlusssache
- 2014: Alles was zählt (episodes 1929–1972)
- 2015: Im Knast
- 2016: Die Spezialisten – Im Namen der Opfer
- 2017: Bettys Diagnose

=== Reality-Shows ===
- 2007: Das große Promi-Pilgern
- 2008: Länder – Menschen – Abenteuer
- 2010: Big Brother Germany (Celebrity-Host)
- 2011: Ich bin ein Star – Holt mich hier raus!
- 2011: Das perfekte Promi-Dinner – Dschungel Spezial
- 2013: Promi-Shopping-Queen
- 2013: Promi Frauentausch

=== TV-Shows ===
- 2000: Wer wird Millionär? (Celebrity-Special)
- 2000: Die Harald Schmidt Show
- 2002, 2003: 3 nach 9
- 2002: Zimmer frei
- 2002, 2008: DAS!
- 2003: Wok-WM
- 2006: Freitag Nacht News
- 2006: TV total
- 2007: Entern oder Kentern
- 2009: NDR Talkshow
- 2009: Anne Will
- 2011, 2015: Markus Lanz
- 2011: Inas Nacht
- 2013: Cindy aus Marzahn und die jungen Wilden
- 2015: Gefragt – Gejagt
- 2016: Primetime-talk
