= Siahnamayi =

Persian term for a negative misrepresentation

Siyāhnamā'ī (Persian: سیاه‌نمایی), literally "portraying in black", is a Persian term which means to either fraudulently or negligently misrepresent a social cause or situation to be gravely dark as opposed to its factual status. This term is usually used by Iranian conservative critics to disparage Iranian films that allegedly convey a negative image of the country.

== Definition ==
Some Iranian critics, most notably Massoud Farasati, believe that films portraying "a gloomy and dark image of social conditions under the Islamic Republic, or an exotic and primitive image of Iranians in rural settings" only seek to win awards in Western film festivals. Some Iranian diaspora and government officials also hold such a reading. Houshang Golmakani is among those who disagree with this interpretation.

Some notable filmmakers in Iran, including Asghar Farhadi and Jafar Panahi, are accused of having such an agenda. Panahi said of the accusations in his 2015 film Taxi, "There are realities they don't want shown... They don't want to show it, but they do it themselves".
