= Massoud Farasati =

Iranian film critic

Massoud Farassati
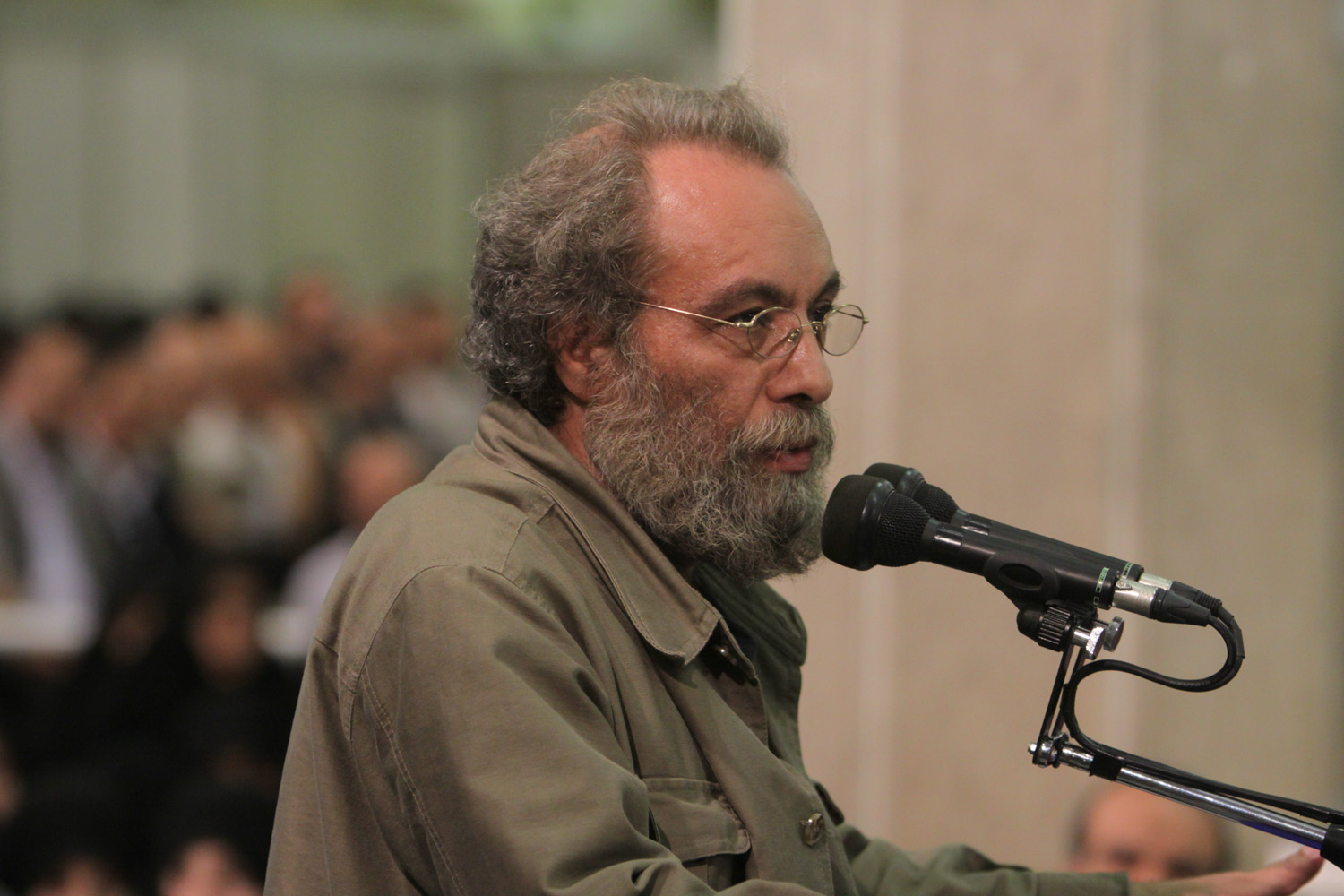
- Born: 1951 (age 74–75); Tehran, Iran
- Education: École nationale supérieure des Beaux-Arts; Université de Vincennes à Saint-Denis; Università di Bologna
- Occupation: Film critic
- Notable work: The Joy of Criticism
- Political party: Laborers’ Party of Iran (1979–81)

Massoud Farassati (also spelled Farasati or Ferasati, Persian: مسعود فراستی) is an Iranian film critic. He used to regularly appear in the Iranian State Television programme Haft, hosted by Fereydoun Jeyrani and later by Behrouz Afkhami. He has published anthologies of writings about such classical filmmakers as Charlie Chaplin, John Ford, Alfred Hitchcock, Federico Fellini, Akira Kurosawa and Ingmar Bergman in Persian.

== Views ==
According to Saeed Kamali Dehghan of The Guardian, his views are close to those of the Iranian government. He is a harshly dismissive of Abbas Kiarostami's works. Farassati uses the terms Siahnamayi and Festival Cinema (Persian: سینمای جشنواره‌ای) to describe films he deems "exotic" to foreign audience and of only seeking to win awards in the West. As of today, Ferassati appears on the show 'Ketab Baaz' with views regarding diverse subjects

== Favourite movies ==
1. Vertigo | Alfred Hitchcock
2. Saraband | Ingmar Bergman
3. Army of Shadows | Jean-Pierre Melville
4. The Wrong Man | Alfred Hitchcock
5. Rio Bravo | Howard Hawks
6. Detective Story | William Wyler
7. The Quiet Man | John Ford
8. Cries and Whispers | Ingmar Bergman
9. Irma la Douce | Billy Wilder
10. The Shop Around the Corner | Ernst Lubitsch
