= Wendy (film) =

2020 film by Benh Zeitlin

- Theatrical release poster
- Directed by: Benh Zeitlin
- Screenplay by: Benh Zeitlin; Eliza Zeitlin
- Based on: Peter Pan by J. M. Barrie
- Produced by: Becky Glupczynski; Dan Janvey; Paul Mezey; Josh Penn
- Starring: Devin France; Yashua Mack; Gage Naquin; Gavin Naquin; Ahmad Cage; Krzysztof Meyn; Romyri Ross
- Cinematography: Sturla Brandth Grøvlen
- Edited by: Scott Cummings; Affonso Gonçalves
- Music by: Dan Romer; Benh Zeitlin
- Production companies: Department of Motion Pictures; Journeyman Pictures
- Distributed by: Searchlight Pictures
- Release dates: January 26, 2020 (Sundance); February 28, 2020 (United States)
- Running time: 112 minutes
- Country: United States
- Language: English
- Budget: $6 million
- Box office: $266,770

Wendy is a 2020 American fantasy drama film directed by Benh Zeitlin, from a screenplay by Zeitlin and his sister Eliza Zeitlin. The film stars Devin France, Yashua Mack, Gage Naquin, Gavin Naquin, Ahmad Cage, Krzysztof Meyn, and Romyri Ross. It is a re-imagining of J. M. Barrie's Peter Pan.

Wendy had its world premiere at the Sundance Film Festival on January 26, 2020 and was released on February 28, 2020 by Searchlight Pictures.

== Plot ==
In 1973, Wendy Darling lives in the rural South with her waitress mother Angela and twin brothers James and Douglas. Back when their next-door neighbor and cousin Thomas Marshall was celebrating his birthday, Thomas storms outside (on discovering what his future will be as an adult) and disappears, with a toddler Wendy watching him being lured into climbing aboard a passing train car by a hooded childlike figure.

One night, as a train passes by their bedroom window, Wendy notices a boy riding on top of the train cars. The three children climb out of their window and join the boy, Peter, who takes them all to a tropical island with an active volcano, which Peter calls "Mother". The island is populated by other children, including their long-lost cousin Thomas, who has not aged a day in over seven years. Peter explains that Mother's spirit resides in the volcano and prevents the children from aging, so long as they believe in her. They later discover a large glowing fish, which is Mother's other form with Wendy then secretly coming across a dated photograph of a deceased family of islanders (in some sort of subterranean shrine decorated with paintings deep beneath a sea cave) that include Peter and concludes Mother must've saved him from a natural disaster (that killed the other islanders) and shared her powers with Peter making him ageless.

While exploring a capsized boat called the Mañana, Douglas injures his head and disappears from sight. The children search for him without success. Missing his twin brother, James withdraws emotionally and his right hand begins to show signs of age. James becomes afraid and asks Peter to cut the hand off lest he become old, which he does. Shocked and disgusted, Wendy takes the wounded James away from the group and is helped by Buzzo, well known by the younger kids as being a former member of their group (who lost his faith in Mother and grew old after his best friend died). Buzzo brings Wendy and James to a settlement of "Olds," children who lost faith in Mother and thus began to age normally. James, bitter at having to grow up without Douglas, rallies the group to kill and eat Mother's fish form in order to regain their youth. The Olds kidnap the children to use as bait for Mother and repurpose the Mañana as a fishing boat.

While evading the Olds, Wendy and Peter find Douglas alive. They swim to the Mañana, where they find the now elderly James, with a hook in place of his missing right hand. As Peter and Wendy rescue the children, James kills Mother with a harpoon. With Peter and the children mournful and the Olds disheartened, Wendy gets them to all start singing, which inspires Peter and revitalizes the volcano. Wendy and Douglas decide it is time for them to go home plus also bring Thomas back with them to give his family closure (along with two other tag along lost children). Knowing that he cannot go home, James stays to play with Peter as his new “enemy” Captain Hook, thereby allowing him to live out the rest of his days with the spirit of a child. 25 years later, Wendy, now a mother herself, wakes to find her daughter Jane climbing aboard a passing train car with none other than Peter himself, still unchanged by time. Unable to keep up, Wendy comforts herself that Peter will look after her daughter and eventually return Jane back home to Wendy.

== Cast ==
- Devin France as Wendy Darling
  - Tommie Milazzo as Baby Wendy
  - Catherine Ott as Teenage Wendy
  - Allison Campbell as Adult Wendy
- Yashua Mack as Peter
- Gage Naquin as Douglas Darling
  - Logan Jones as Aged 7 Douglas
  - John Belloni as Teenage Douglas
  - Levy Easterly as Adult Douglas
- Gavin Naquin as James Darling
  - Luke Jones as Aged 7 James
  - Kevin Pugh as Captain James Hook
- Krzysztof Meyn as Thomas
  - Weldon Barry as Teenage Thomas
  - Hunter McGregor as Adult Thomas
- Ahmad Cage as Sweet Heavy
- Romyri Ross as Cudjoe Head
- Lowell Landes as Buzzo
- Shay Walker as Angela Darling
- Cleopatra King Welch as Jane Darling

== Production ==
In August 2015, it was announced Benh Zeitlin would write and direct the film. Production began in March 2017, with filming taking place in Montserrat and Antigua.

== Release ==
In April 2018, Searchlight Pictures (then-named Fox Searchlight Pictures) acquired the film’s rights. It had its world premiere at the Sundance Film Festival on January 26, 2020. It was released on February 28, 2020.

== Reception ==
On review aggregator website Rotten Tomatoes, the film holds an approval rating of 42% based on 113 reviews, with an average rating of 5.70/10. The site's critical consensus reads, "Wendy dares to do something different with its classic source material; unfortunately, the movie's breathtaking visuals are at odds with a flawed take on the story." On Metacritic, the film has a weighted average score of 55 out of 100, based on 36 critics, indicating "mixed or average reviews".
