= Age of Cannibals =

2014 film directed by Johannes Naber

- Theatrical release poster in German
- Directed by: Johannes Naber
- Written by: Stefan Weigl
- Produced by: Milena Maitz
- Cinematography: Pascal Schmit
- Edited by: Ben von Grafenstein
- Music by: Cornelius Schwehr
- Production company: Studio TV Film
- Release dates: 10 February 2014 (Berlinale); 22 May 2014
- Running time: 93 minutes
- Country: Germany
- Language: German

Age of Cannibals (German: Zeit der Kannibalen) is a 2014 German drama film directed by Johannes Naber, starring Devid Striesow, Katharina Schüttler and Sebastian Blomberg. It tells the story of two business consultants who travel to impoverished and corrupt countries where they make shady business deals, never having to leave their hotels. The film is made like a chamber play with stylised and grotesque acting. Principal photography took place from 8 January to 14 February 2013.

The premiere took place at the 64th Berlin International Film Festival, where the film played in the section Perspektive Deutsches Kino. At the German Film Award 2015 it received the third-place prize in the category Best Fiction Film and the prize for Best Screenplay. It was also nominated for Best Direction.

== Cast ==
- Devid Striesow as Frank Öllers
- Sebastian Blomberg as Kai Niederländer
- Katharina Schüttler as Bianca März
- Romesh Ranganathan as Singh
- Steve Ellery as John Schernikau
- Jaymes Butler as Vincent Akume
- Warsame Guled as Mulatu
- Florence Kasumba as Magdalena
- Joana Adu-Gyamfi as Saralina
- Veronica Naujocks as Asa Onochi
