= Cornelius Schwehr =

Cornelius Schwehr (born 23 December 1953) in Freiburg im Breisgau is a German composer.

== Career ==
From 1971 to 1975 he took composition lessons with Walter Heck in Freiburg. This was followed by studies from 1975 to 1981 in music theory with Peter Förtig, composition with Klaus Huber and guitar at the Hochschule für Musik Freiburg. From 1981 to 1983 he studied composition with Helmut Lachenmann at the State University of Music and Performing Arts Stuttgart. From 1981 to 1995 he was a lecturer in Freiburg, Karlsruhe and at the Zurich University of the Arts. He was a scholarship holder of the Heinrich Strobel Foundation and the Kunststiftung Baden-Württemberg. Since 1995, he has been a professor of composition, music theory, and the writing of films scores at the Freiburg Musikhochschule. Over his career, he has composed many musical works for different settings and instruments.

On behalf of ZDF/ARTE, he composed a new film score for the silent film Der müde Tod by Fritz Lang, which premiered in 2016 and was broadcast on ARTE.

Since 2009 he has been a member of the Academy of Arts, Berlin.

== Awards ==
- FilmArtFestival Mecklenburg-Pomerania: Best music and sound design for Age of Cannibals.
