= Victoria (2015 film) =

2015 German film by Sebastian Schipper

- Theatrical release poster
- Directed by: Sebastian Schipper
- Written by: Olivia Neergaard-Holm; Sebastian Schipper; Eike Frederik Schulz
- Produced by: Jan Dressler; Christiane Dressler; Sebastian Schipper
- Starring: Laia Costa; Frederick Lau; Franz Rogowski; Max Mauff; Burak Yiğit; André Hennicke
- Cinematography: Sturla Brandth Grøvlen
- Music by: Nils Frahm
- Production companies: MonkeyBoy; Deutschfilm; RadicalMedia; WDR; Arte; The Match Factory
- Distributed by: Senator Film
- Release dates: 7 February 2015 (BIFF); 11 June 2015 (Germany)
- Running time: 138 minutes
- Country: Germany
- Languages: German; English
- Budget: €443,300
- Box office: €6.1 million

Victoria is a 2015 German crime thriller film directed by Sebastian Schipper. The film stars Laia Costa and Frederick Lau. It is one of the few feature films shot in a single continuous take.

== Plot ==
Victoria is a Spanish woman who moved to Berlin and has been living there for three months. She works in a cafe for a meager wage, and does not know anybody in the city. In addition, she does not speak much German, and relies on English to communicate with others. Leaving a club at around 4 o’clock in the morning after a night of dancing and drinking, she meets four young men who are denied entry to the club. They are “Sonne” (sun), “Boxer”, “Blinker” (turn signal), and “Fuß” (foot). The men, who are celebrating Fuß' birthday, invite her to take a walk through the city and she agrees. After stealing some alcohol from an all night shop, they all get on the roof of an apartment building where they drink and smoke marijuana together, while Boxer reveals that he spent time in jail for hurting someone.

When Victoria tells the others that she has to leave because she must open up the cafe she works at shortly, Sonne, who was flirting with her the whole time, suggests accompanying her there and she agrees. When Sonne leaves with her, he is told by Boxer to return soon. It is implied that the four men have something important to do this night.

When Victoria and Sonne arrive at the cafe, she invites him in for a cup of coffee, but he insists he only drinks chocolate milk. While the two are alone inside, Sonne notices a piano, tinkles a bit on it and then dares Victoria to also play something. After much coaxing, she sits down and masterfully plays one of the Mephisto Waltzes, deeply impressing and moving Sonne. She then reveals that she had dedicated her whole life to the dream of becoming a concert pianist but had been told a short time ago at her music school in Spain that she was not good enough to continue.

Shortly after, an extremely nervous and agitated Boxer arrives with the others and demands that Sonne leave with him immediately.

In front of the cafe, the four men steal a car and drive away, only to come back a few minutes later because Fuß, who had been already heavily intoxicated before, has now fallen unconscious and even after they manage to wake him up, is clearly way too drunk to do whatever Boxer needs him for.

A desperate Boxer demands that Sonne ask Victoria to replace Fuß and help them, since they need three guys and one drive. Sonne is reluctant at first, but finally does what Boxer asked. He tells Victoria that Boxer needs to do a favor for someone he knew from jail, but doesn't get into specifics.

Victoria agrees, much to Sonne's surprise and drives Sonne, Boxer and Blinker, as well as the drunk Fuß in the trunk, to the agreed meeting point in a parking garage.

It is then revealed, that while in jail, Boxer was under the protection of local gangster Andi, who now demands Boxer and his friends rob €50,000 from a specific nearby bank this same morning, in order for Boxer to pay back his debt to Andi for protecting him. 10,000 are for Andi, the rest of it they can keep for themselves. This comes as a shock to all four of them. Boxer offers Andi that he will get the money another way and pay him back if he gives him a week's time for it. Andi agrees but, since his condition is that Victoria stays with him for that week, they reluctantly agree to do the robbery. Andi provides them with guns, masks, as well as some cocaine for their nerves.

On the way to the bank, Blinker suffers a panic attack. Feeling guilty over having dragged them all into this, Boxer offers to rob the bank on his own, but Victoria is adamant about helping him and Sonne and Blinker eventually go along with it as well.

Arriving at the bank, Sonne, Boxer and Blinker carry out the robbery, while Victoria waits in the car. The robbery itself goes smoothly, however the car initially doesn't start, which costs them a few valuable seconds. Despite all this, they get away and abandon their car and find themselves at the exact same club, they first met outside of hours before.

Despite better judgement, fueled by their euphoria they decide to go into the club to celebrate.

Inside the club, Victoria and Sonne kiss, while Boxer and Blinker strip naked on the dance floor in euphoria. After the four of them are thrown out for that, they go back to the car to pick up Fuß, who is still in the trunk of car, only to realize, that the police have arrived at the car in the meantime.

Panicking, they leave Fuß behind and initially trying to leave the scene quietly, but are spotted by cops in plainclothes, which leads to a chase on foot into a back alley during which Blinker is gunned down by the police and Boxer shortly after him, after he sacrifices himself to buy Victoria and Sonne some time.

Sonne and Victoria manage to enter an apartment building unseen, and take a young couple hostage in one of the apartments. When they notice that the couple has a baby, they change clothes, take the baby with them and leave the apartment, under the desperate cries of the mother. When encountered by the police, they manage to give the impression that they are a young family and are allowed to leave the building.

They leave the baby in front of a café across the street and hail a taxi which brings them to a nearby hotel. There, Victoria reserves a room while Sonne waits, writhing in great pain. On the way to their room, Victoria notices that Sonne has been shot. Lying down on the hotel bed, he watches the news, learning that Blinker and Boxer have died. Victoria then notices that Sonne is bleeding profusely from his wound.

A dying Sonne urges Victoria to go and take the money as no one knows who she is. Victoria calls an ambulance but Sonne dies shortly afterwards holding Victoria's hands and she breaks down crying.

After pulling herself together, she notices the money on the floor, picks it up, walks out of the hotel and walks down the street into an uncertain future.

== Cast ==
- Laia Costa as Victoria
- Frederick Lau as Sonne
- Franz Rogowski as Boxer
- Max Mauff as Fuß
- Burak Yiğit as Blinker
- André Hennicke as Andi

== Production ==
The film was shot in a single long take by Sturla Brandth Grøvlen from 4:30 to 7:00 A.M. on 27 April 2014 in the Kreuzberg and Mitte neighborhoods of Berlin. The script consisted of 12 pages, with most of the dialogue being improvised.

To get financiers onboard, director Sebastian Schipper promised to deliver a version using traditional shot cutting as “plan B” if he couldn't achieve the final product in a true single take. The cut version was filmed first, over 10 days, as a series of 10-minute takes, so that Schipper would have a completed film even if the one-take version failed. Schipper has characterised the cut version as “not good”. The budget permitted only three attempts at the one-take version. According to Schipper, the first attempt was dull because the actors were too cautious, being afraid to make mistakes; the second attempt was the opposite, as the actors went “crazy”. Schipper says he became “angry” and “terrified” after seeing the second take and realizing he had only one chance left; in a subsequent meeting, he gave the cast a “hairdryer speech ... [it] was not a meeting that ended in hugs and 'good talk.' It was crazy. But the tension was built on knowing we wanted the same thing”. Schipper believes the final attempt was successful because there was an element of “aggression” missing from the other versions.

== Soundtrack ==
The score was composed and produced by Nils Frahm; an album version of the soundtrack was released on 12 June 2015.

No.	Title	Performed by	Length
1.	"Burn With Me (Victoria Edit)"	DJ Koze	5:18
2.	"Our Own Roof"	Nils Frahm	5:18
3.	"A Stolen Car"	Nils Frahm	4:44
4.	"In The Parking Garage"	Nils Frahm	4:55
5.	"Them"	Nils Frahm	4:00
6.	"The Bank"	Nils Frahm	7:18
7.	"The Shooting"	Nils Frahm	4:50
8.	"Nobody Knows Who You Are"	Nils Frahm	2:48
9.	"Pendulum"	Nils Frahm	2:41
10.	"Happy New Fear (Bonus track)"	Deichkind	2:32
11.	"Marilyn Whirlwind (Bonus track)"	DJ Koze	7:12

== Reception ==
=== Critical response ===
On review aggregator website Rotten Tomatoes, 82% of 136 reviews are positive, with an average rating of 7.6/10. The website's critical consensus states: "Victoria's single-take production is undeniably impressive, but it's also an effective drama in its own right – and one that juggles its tonal shifts as deftly as its technical complexities." On Metacritic, the film has a weighted average score of 77 out of 100, based on 27 critics, indicating "generally favorable reviews".

The Hollywood Reporter described the film as a "kinetic, frenetic, sense-swamping rollercoaster ride" but said the plot was somewhat implausible. Variety reviewed the film well, calling it "suffused with a surprising degree of grace and emotional authenticity."

=== Accolades ===
At the German Film Award 2015, Victoria received the awards for Best Fiction Film, Direction, Actress in a Leading Role (Costa), Actor in a Leading Role (Lau), Cinematography and Music. It was also nominated for Best Sound Design.

It screened in the main competition section of the 65th Berlin International Film Festival where the film's cinematographer Sturla Brandth Grøvlen won a Silver Bear for Outstanding Artistic Contribution for Cinematography. It was selected for the Special Presentations section of the 2015 Toronto International Film Festival. It was one of eight films shortlisted by Germany to be its submission for the Academy Award for Best Foreign Language Film at the 88th Academy Awards. However, it lost out to Labyrinth of Lies, after it was disqualified by the Academy because of its high percentage of English dialogue. In 2017, Laia Costa was nominated for an EE Rising Star Award for her performance in the film at the 70th British Academy Film Awards.
