= The Fire (2015 film) =

2015 film

- Film poster
- Directed by: Juan Schnitman
- Written by: Agustina Liendo
- Starring: Pilar Gamboa
- Release dates: 6 February 2015 (Berlin); 28 May 2015 (Argentina)
- Running time: 95 minutes
- Country: Argentina
- Language: Spanish

The Fire (Spanish: El incendio) is a 2015 Argentine drama film directed by Juan Schnitman. It was screened in the Panorama section of the 65th Berlin International Film Festival. The film won the top prize at the 2015 Transilvania International Film Festival.

== Plot ==
Lucía and Marcelo are about to buy a condominium. The date of the purchase or the handing over of the keys is delayed by one day and thus offers the opportunity to reconsider the drastic decision that will determine their future for a long time. The story is told in a close-up of the course of this day, in which communication patterns, professional and health problems, hopes and wishes come to light. The situation escalates both verbally and physically.

== Cast ==
- Pilar Gamboa as Lucía
- Juan Barberini as Marcelo
