= Petting Zoo (film) =

2015 film

- Directed by: Micah Magee
- Written by: Micah Magee
- Starring: Kiowa Tucker
- Release date: 10 February 2015 (Berlin)
- Countries: Germany; Greece; United States
- Language: English

Petting Zoo is a 2015 internationally co-produced drama film directed by Micah Magee. It was screened in the Panorama section of the 65th Berlin International Film Festival.

== Cast ==
- Devon Keller
- Kiowa Tucker as Danny
