= Dyke Hard =

2014 film

- Film poster
- Directed by: Bitte Andersson
- Written by: Bitte Andersson; Martin Borell; Alexi Carpentieri
- Starring: Lina Kurttila
- Release dates: 8 November 2014 (SIFF); 20 February 2015 (Sweden)
- Running time: 82 minutes
- Country: Sweden
- Languages: English; Swedish
- Budget: Kickstarter

Dyke Hard is a 2014 Swedish comedy film directed by Bitte Andersson. It was screened at the 2014 Stockholm International Film Festival and was shown in the Panorama section of the 65th Berlin International Film Festival. The film was funded by Kickstarter.

== Cast ==
- Lina Kurttila as Riff
- Peggy Sands as Peggy
- Maria Wågensjö as Scotty
- Alle Eriksson as Bandito
- Iki Gonzalez as Dawn
- Josephine Krieg as Moira
- Anitha Nygårds as Warden Henderson
- Ylva Maria Thompson as Morgana the Ghost
- Ann-Charlotte Andersson as Lola
- Jackson Bell as King Explosion Murder
- Joseph Huncovsky as Ninja Toilet
- Henry Miazga as Henry's World Ruler

== Awards ==
- Winner of MIX Copenhagen Audience Award 2015.
