= Waldemar Pokromski =

Polish make-up artist (born 1946)

- Born: 26 August 1946 (age 80); Sława Śląska
- Occupation: Make-up artist
- Years active: 1976–present

Waldemar Pokromski (born 26 August 1946) is a makeup artist.

== Biography ==
He was elected a member of the American Academy of Motion Picture Arts and Sciences (AMPAS) and the European Film Academy (EFA).

== Filmography ==
- Tańczący jastrząb (1977)
- Spokojne lata (1981)
- A Year of the Quiet Sun (Rok spokojnego słońca, 1984)
- Medium (1985)
- Schindler's List (1993)
- Feuerreiter (1998)
- The Pianist (2002)
- The Revenge (Zemsta, 2002)
- Katyń (2007)
- Reverse (Rewers, 2009)
- Wintervater (2010)
- Walesa: Man of Hope (Wałęsa. Człowiek z nadziei, 2013)
- Sąsiady (2014)
- The Cut (2014)
- Tod den Hippies!! Es lebe der Punk (2015)
- Hiszpanka (2015)
- Colonia (2015)
- Snowden (2016)
- Marie Curie: The Courage of Knowledge (2016)
- Captain America: Civil War (2016)
- Berlin Station (2016), episodes 1−2, 4
- Nur ein Tag (2017)
- Mug (Twarz, 2018)
- Mute (2018)
- Magnesium (Magnezja, 2020)
- Joika (2023)
- Woman Of... (Kobieta z..., 2023)
- The Zone of Interest (2023)
- The Peasants (Chłopi, 2023)
- Köln 75 (2025)

== Awards and distinctions ==
In 2015 he received the Gold Gloria Artis Medal for Merit to Culture.
