= Sometime in August =

- Directed by: Sebastian Schipper
- Screenplay by: Sebastian Schipper
- Based on: Elective Affinities by Johann Wolfgang von Goethe
- Produced by: Sebastian Zühr; Henning Ferber; Marcus Welke
- Cinematography: Frank Blau
- Edited by: Horst Reiter
- Music by: Vic Chesnutt
- Release dates: 8 February 2009 (Berlinale); 30 July 2009
- Running time: 92 minutes
- Country: Germany
- Language: German

Sometime in August (German: Mitte Ende August) is a 2009 German drama film directed by Sebastian Schipper, starring Marie Bäumer, Milan Peschel, André Hennicke and Anna Brüggemann. It tells the story of Thomas and Hanna, a happily married couple settled on the countryside, whose relationship is challenged when they are visited by Tomas' brother and Hanna's goddaughter. The film is loosely based on the 1809 novel Elective Affinities by Johann Wolfgang von Goethe.

The film premiered in the Forum section of the 59th Berlin International Film Festival. It won the Grand Prix at the Cabourg Film Festival.

== Cast ==
- Milan Peschel as Thomas
- Marie Bäumer as Hanna
- Anna Brüggemann as Augustine
- André Hennicke as Friedrich
- Gert Voss as Bo
- Agnes Zeltina as Galina Petrova

== Production ==
The film was produced by Film1 GmbH & Co. KG in collaboration with Senator Film Produktion and Norddeutscher Rundfunk. Filming took place in Hamburg, from 28 August to 21 October 2007.

== Reception ==
Kirk Honeycutt of The Hollywood Reporter wrote: "Goethe seemingly was playing with notions of fate and free will but his work is generally considered enigmatic. For his part, Schipper shows a couple's equilibrium getting upset by outside forces, but he never establishes any reason why this should be." Honeycutt continued: "The four characters -- along with a brief, somewhat inexplicable appearance by Hanna's father and his absurd Russian girlfriend -- never really come alive. The actors are all rather earnest and a score by American singer-songwriter Vic Chesnutt wears soulfulness on its sleeve. But the film never gets at what ails these people. It must be bad chemistry."
