= Katharina Schüttler =

German television and film actress (born 1979)

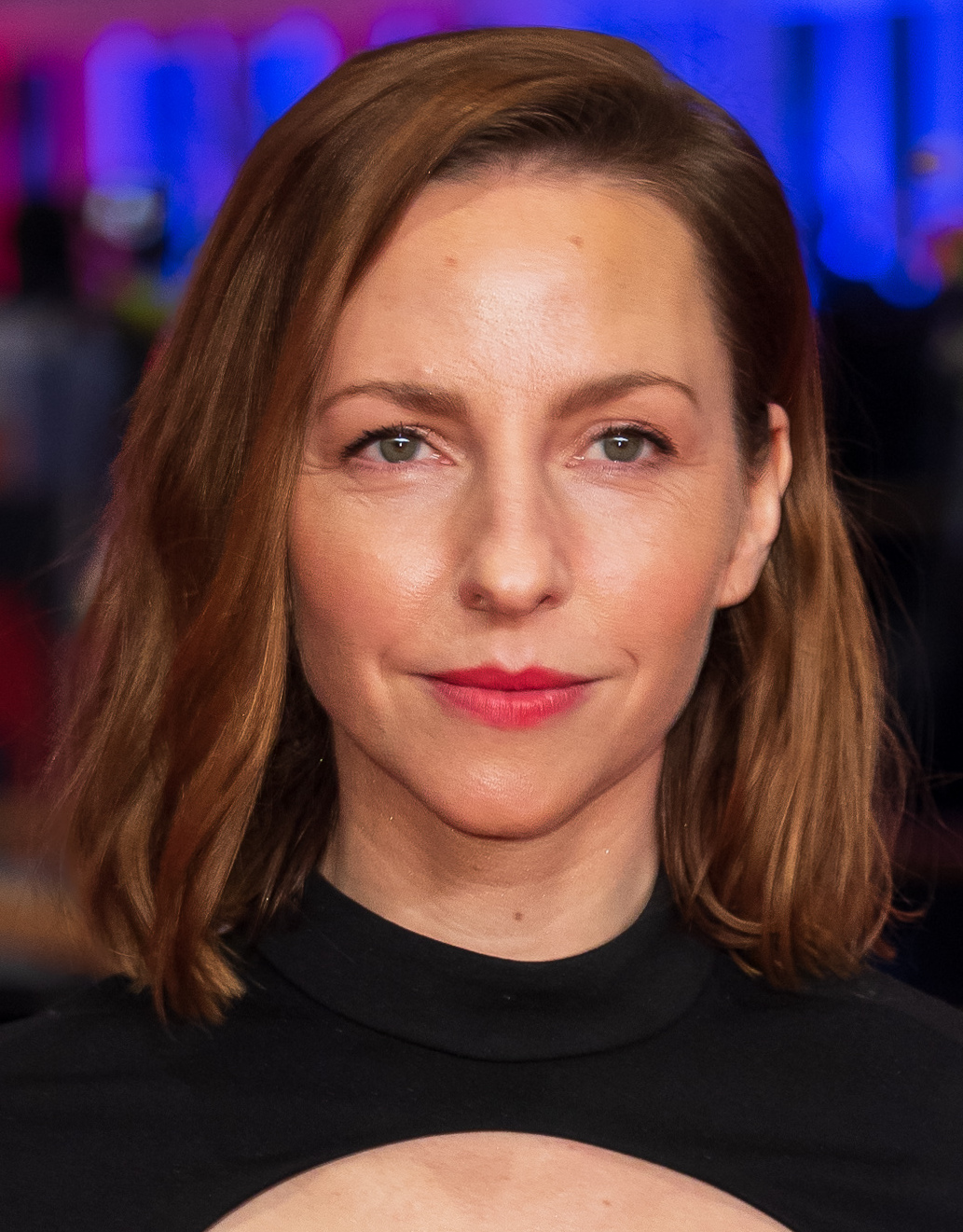
- Schüttler on the red carpet of the opening gala of the Berlinale in February 2023
- Born: 20 October 1979 (age 46); Cologne, West Germany
- Occupation: Actress
- Spouse: Till Franzen
- Children: 2

Katharina Schüttler (born 20 October 1979) is a German television and film actress. Her film debut was in the movie Die Lok in 1992. She is best known internationally for leading roles as Clara Rosenbaum in The Promise (2011) and as Greta Müller in the television drama Generation War (2013).

== Life and career ==
Katharina Schüttler was born and raised in Cologne. Her father is an actor, director and former theatre director and her mother is a playwright. After high school she studied acting at the Hanover University of Music, Drama and Media from 1999 to 2003.

In 2002, she played the title role in the German premiere of the play Lolita in a staging of Peter Kestmüller at the Schauspiel Hannover.

Katharina Schüttler preferably plays radical roles in which people are torn in existential situations.

In 2006, she was awarded by the critics survey of the magazine Theater Today 2006.

== Selected filmography ==
- Die Lok (1992)
- The Cry of Love (1997)
- Bombenstimmung (1997)
- Alles auf die 17 (1998)
- Der Trippler (2000)
- The State I Am In (2000)
- The White Sound (2002)
- Sophiiiie! (2002)
- Sehnsucht (2004)
- Wahrheit oder Pflicht (2005)
- Mädchen am Sonntag (2005)
- Three Degrees Colder (2005)
- Close to You (2009)
- The Day Will Come (2009)
- What a Man (2011)
- Generation War (2013, TV series)
- Run (2013, TV series)
- Free Fall (2013)
- Joy of Fatherhood (2014)
- Age of Cannibals (2014)
- Clara Immerwahr (2014, TV film)
- Everything Is Love (2014)
- 13 Minutes (2015)
- Grzimek (2015)
- Heidi (2015)
- Alone in Berlin (2016)
- Wunderlich's World (2016)
- The King's Choice (2016)
- The Little Drummer Girl (2018, TV series)
- Dogs of Berlin (2018, TV series)
- The Wedding (2020)
- Der Überläufer (2020)
- Weil wir Champions sind (2022, TV film)
