= European Film College =

Film school in Denmark

Coordinates: 56°11′38″N 10°41′30″E

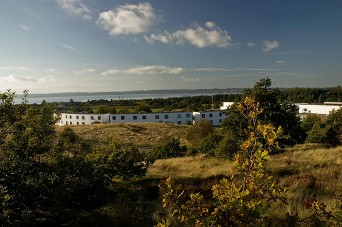
- Type: Film school
- Established: 1993; 33 years ago
- Principal: Nikolaj Davidsen and Åsa Mossberg
- Location: Ebeltoft, Djursland, Denmark
- Campus: Ebeltoft

European Film College (Danish: Den Europæiske Filmhøjskole) is a film school and a Danish folk high school in Denmark, offering a one-year film foundation programme in practical filmmaking covering the fields of screenwriting, camera, sound, acting, lighting, directing, editing, documentary and producing. The school is based in Ebeltoft and 120 students from around the world graduate from the programme every year.

== Background ==
A board was established in 1989 in Denmark to promote and further film making for young people in Europe. European Film College subsequently opened on its present premises in May 1993, designed by Heikkinen – Komonen Architects.

Since the opening European Film College has trained more than 2000 young people in the art and craft of film making. The institution is based on the Danish tradition of the Folk High School (folkehøjskole), adult education institutions that do not grant academic degrees but aim to give students a common foundation in a particular field of study. This also means that both students, teachers and principal are living at the school throughout the programme.

== Administration ==
The current Principals are Nikolaj Davidsen and Åsa Mossberg (Denmark). Previous Principals include Bjørn Erichsen (1990–1994), Kjeld Veirup (1994–2000), Jens Rykær (2000–2006), Pia Maria Marquard (2006–2007), Søren Høy (2007–2010), Mette Damgaard-Sørensen (2010–2014), Nadia Kløvedal Reich (2014–2018), Ellen Riis (2018-2021) and interim principals Klaus Hansen and Simon Weil (2021)

The school has an active network of former students and ambassadors across the world.

== Film course ==
English is the working language both in courses and in everyday life. The curriculum combines classroom instruction in the different areas of film making as well as 3 major projects, the chance to make extracurricular projects, and several smaller exercises where students are assigned to crews to make film productions. Throughout the programme, students rotate the key roles in a film crew in order to gain an overview of all areas of film production. Exercises and projects are screened and evaluated in the presence of all students and teachers.

== Student life ==
The students live on campus and the course fee includes tuition, food, accommodation and leisure activities. 55% of the students are Danish and the rest come from all over the world, in recent years from up to 25 different countries. The majority of the students are aged between 19 and 25. European Film College requires no prior qualifications for admission, except for the fact that students need to be at least 18 years old and be able to speak and write English. The aim is to create a global learning atmosphere with an equal balance of male and female students.

== Equipment ==
The college has a fully equipped 300 sq m. film studio, 14 Avid editing suites, a sound studio (Pro Tools), professional sound equipment and more than 20 professional HD cameras of various sizes.

The college has two cinemas. The larger Store Bjørn ("Big Bear", named after Nordisk Film's logo) is fitted with Dolby Digital Surround sound (7.1), first-class film (digital and 3D) and Blu-ray projection and luxury seating for 209 viewers. The smaller one, Lille Bjørn (“Little Bear”) cinema can accommodate 46 viewers and can play Blu-ray and DVD.

== Surroundings and leisure ==
European Film College is situated on the outskirts of the town of Ebeltoft, on the Djursland peninsula. Popular attractions, such as the modern Glass Museum, the New Malt Factory and the Fregatten Jylland ship, attracts many tourists in the summer. The closest cities are Grenå 30 km by road to the northeast and Aarhus, 45 km by road to the west. There is an hourly bus service connecting with Aarhus and a coach service to Copenhagen departs from Ebeltoft. The Aarhus Airport is 15 km to the north. Ebeltoft and most of Djursland was designated as a National Park in 2009 and present conservational important and interesting nature scenery.

On campus there is a playing field, basketball and volleyball courts. Students can use the local fitness centre and indoor swimming pool at reduced rates.

== Notable alumni ==
- Nikolaj Arcel
- Philip "Pilou" Asbæk
- Beate Bille
- Charlotte Bruus Christensen
- Pernille Fischer Christensen
- Olivier Bugge Coutté
- Sturla Brandth Grøvlen
- Philippe Lesage
- Mikkel E. G. Nielsen
- Michael Noer
- Hlynur Pálmason
- Joachim Trier
- Fabian Wagner
- Martin Zandvliet
