= Sibs Shongwe-La Mer =

South African film director

- Born: Sibusiso Mandla Shongwe; 11 September 1991 (age 35); Johannesburg, South Africa
- Occupations: Film Director, Visual Artist, Actor, Screenwriter
- Years active: 2012–present
- Agent(s): Casarotto, Ramsey & Associates Creative Artists Agency
- Notable work: Necktie Youth

Sibs Shongwe- La Mer (born 11 September 1991) is a screenwriter, film director, musician, and visual artist born in Johannesburg, South Africa. He his known for his critically acclaimed debut feature film, Necktie Youth, exploring themes of suburbia malaise, depression and the new South African experience.

== Early life ==
Shongwe-La Mer (born Sibusiso Mandla Shongwe) was born in Sandton in the Northern Suburbs of Johannesburg, South Africa on 11 September 1991. He dropped out of high school before his last two exams with the aim of working for a production company.

== Career ==
Shongwe-La Mer first started working as an independent music video director and rock n roll photographer for South African local acts before transitioning to filmmaking. His first notable international film festival exposure was with the self funded low-fi production Territorial Pissings that was screened as a "Work-in-Progress" at the 2013 70th Venice International Film Festival (La Biennale di Venezia).

In 2015 he released his debut feature film, Necktie Youth which premiered in the Panorama section of the 65th Berlin International Film Festival. The film screened at other festivals including Tribeca Film Festival, Sydney Film Festival and the Durban International Film Festival where it won "Best South African Feature Film" and "Best Direction" that same year. Necktie Youth went on to win other awards including "Best Achievement in Cinematography" and "Best Achievement in editing" at the 2015 South African Film and Television Awards and, Best Film at the World Cinema Amsterdam Film Festival, and Audience Award at the AFI Film Festival. The film was theatrically released in South Africa in 2015, on the iTunes Store and DStv Box-office the following year. The film was later released in the Netherlands, Brazil & American VOD over the course of 2016 and 2017.

In 2016, Shongwe-La Mer signed representation contracts with the London film literary agency Casarotto Ramsey & Associates, LBI entertainment and CAA.

In 2016, Shongwe-La Mer made the selection for the Berlinale Talents program. 2017 brought the director back to the festival for a third consecutive year with a feature film in development selected for the "Berlinale Directors" category of the Co-Production Market (European Film Market ) with the screenplay for the South African drama The Color Of The Skull.

Later that year Shongwe-La Mer had a third feature project selected for the Paris Co-Production Village at the 2017 Champs-Élysées Film Festival, where he presented The Sound Of Animals Fighting screenplay. That October, Variety reported the feature had Emile Hirsch and X-Men star Alice Braga attached to the project.

In 2018 Shongwe-La Mer participated in the Cannes Film Festival where he took his screenplay Color Of The Skull to l´Atelier de la Cinéfondation. Shongwe-La Mer took the top prize winning Le Prix ARTE International for most promising cinematic vision.

== International Grants & Residencies ==
=== Film ===
==== Amsterdams Fonds voor de Kunst (Netherlands)- 3 Package Deal Recipient (2017–2018) ====
This programme from the AFK and Bureau Broedplaatsen (BBp) in association with 35 renowned Amsterdam arts institutions is now considered an example of best practices in the field of talent development. The aim of the 3Package Deal is to encourage and assist exceptional global talent from various disciplines who are awarded working space and a development budget (€22,500). Moreover, each artistic discipline allows coalitions, which now fifty renowned Amsterdam (Art) participating institutions. These institutions take a long year the selection and supervision of the promising artists themselves and their network, knowledge and stages open to them.

Sibs Shongwe-La Mer was selected as one of two global filmmakers as part of the Film Coalition made up of EYE Film Institute Netherlands, the Netherlands Film Academy, the Binger Filmlab and IDFA (film festival). Halal, the Amsterdam producer, has also entered into a creative alliance with this talented young filmmaker. In the coming year, Sibs Shongwe-La Mer plans to develop a second full-length film in collaboration with this producer, and with the support of the Film Coalition. In addition, he will try to promote a closer cooperation between young Dutch and South African filmmakers.

==== Berlinale (Germany)- Berlinale Talents (2016) ====
Berlinale Talent Campus is the annual summit and networking platform of the Berlin International Film Festival for 250 outstanding creatives from the fields of film and drama series. Berlinale Talents is an initiative of the Berlin International Film Festival, a business division of the Kulturveranstaltungen des Bundes in Berlin GmbH, funded by the Federal Government Commissioner for Culture and the Media, in cooperation with Creative Europe MEDIA, a programme of the European Union, the Robert Bosch Stiftung and Medienboard Berlin-Brandenburg. It was initiated in 2003. In addition to the extensive summit programme of master classes and panel discussions with top-notch experts, Berlinale Talents offers a range of Project Labs in which you can further develop and present your own project. Berlinale Talents also provides Studio programmes and workshops for specific groups of film professionals. As an initiative of the Berlin International Film Festival, the entire event is closely linked with the programmes of the festival sections and the European Film Market. Shongwe-La Mer was selected for the 2016 edition of talents although could not be in attendance.

==== Festival Del Film Locarno (Switzerland)- Filmmakers Academy (2015) ====
Founded in 2010 with the aim of helping develop the abilities of emerging talents, the Locarno Academy is a Locarno Festival training project for young directors, professionals, students and film critics. The Academy was born from a desire to build on Locarno's attributes as a site of productive encounters, exchange of views and reflection on film, taking full advantage of the Festival's infrastructure and its numerous guests. A hundred promising young talents from all over the world are selected and invited to participate in one of the Locarno Summer Academy's five initiatives: Filmmakers Academy, Critics Academy, Industry Academy, Documentary Summer School and Cinema&Gioventù. The program offers a range of training options, spanning from general film education, training in film criticism for young journalists, to workshops for the upcoming generation of industry professionals and emerging directors working on their first film.

=== Visual Arts ===
==== Prince Claus Fund (Netherlands) (2015) ====
The Prince Claus Fund was established in 1996, named in honor of Prince Claus of the Netherlands. It receives an annual subsidy from the Dutch Ministry of Foreign Affairs. The Fund has presented the international Prince Claus Awards annually since 1997 to honor individuals and organizations reflecting a progressive and contemporary approach to the themes of culture and development. Recipients are mainly located in Africa, Asia, Latin America, and the Caribbean.

== Filmography ==
=== As writer/director ===
- Death Of Tropics (2012) (Whitman Pictures Independent)
- Territorial Pissings (2013) (Whitman Pictures Independent)
- Necktie Youth (2015) (Urucu media/Halal Films
- The Sound Of Animals Fighting (In Development) (2018) (Fireworx Media)
- Color Of The Skull (In Development) (2018) (Mille Et Une Paris/Halal Film/Whitman Pictures Independent)

=== As actor ===
- Necktie Youth (Supporting Lead- "September") (2015) (SA)
- "The Cubs Won (And I Died) (Supporting role- "Brice") (2017) (US)

=== As Producer/Executive Producer ===
- Death Of Tropics (2012)
- Territorial Pissings (2013)

== Awards/Nominations ==
Year	Awards	Category	Recipient	Outcome
2015	Durban International Film Festival	Best South African Feature Film	necktie youth	Won
2015	Durban International Film Festival	Best Director	necktie youth	Won
2015	Tribeca Film Festival	Best Narrative Feature	necktie youth	Nominated
2015	Granada Film Festival Cines del Sur	Golden Alhambra	necktie youth	Nominated
2016	Festival De Films Geneva	Prix de la Critique	necktie youth	Won
2015	Festival de cinéma de la ville de Québec	Grand prix de la compétition	necktie youth	Won
2015	Festival de cinéma de la ville de Québec	Prix du jury collégial	necktie youth	Won
2015	World Cinema Amsterdam	Best Film	necktie youth	Won
2015	Carthage Film Festival	TV5 Award	necktie youth	Won
2015	AFI Fest	Breakthrough Audience Award	necktie youth	Nominated
2017	Young Independents 2017	Top Industry Disruptor	Won	
