= Hinter Gittern – Der Frauenknast =

- Genre: Drama, Soap
- Created by: Rainer Wemcken
- Starring: Karen Böhne; Uta Prelle; Egon Hofmann; Katy Karrenbauer; Barbara Freier; Christiane Reiff; Christine Schuberth; Heidi Weigelt; Claudia Loerding
- Country of origin: Germany
- Original language: German
- No. of seasons: 16
- No. of episodes: 403

Production
- Running time: around 45 minutes
- Production company: Grundy UFA TV Produktions GmbH

Original release
- Network: RTL Television
- Release: 22 September 1997 – 13 February 2007

Hinter Gittern – Der Frauenknast (English: "Behind bars - The Women's Prison", in short: HG or HiGi) is a German television series in the form of a soap opera and told the dramaturgically oversubscribed-life in a prison for women. The series was broadcast from 22 September 1997 until 13 February 2007 at the private broadcaster RTL. The acts played in the fictional prison for women, Reutlitz in Berlin and included lesbian love affairs, drug deals, escape attempts, conflicts with sadistic prison guards, as well as crimes such as murder.

RTL decided to cancel the long running drama after 16 seasons and 403 episodes. The last nine episodes were transmitted during the night at 01.05 AM.

A Turkish adaption, Parmaklıklar Ardında (Behind Bars) is filmed in Sinop.
