= A Minor Leap Down =

- Film poster
- Directed by: Hamed Rajabi
- Written by: Hamed Rajabi
- Produced by: Majid Barzegar; Saeed Armand; Etienne de Ricaud; Nader T. Homayoun
- Starring: Negar Javaherian; Rambod Javan
- Cinematography: Majid Gorjiyan
- Edited by: Esmail Monsef
- Release dates: February 5, 2015 (Berlinale); March 18, 2015 (Iran)
- Running time: 88 minutes
- Countries: Iran; France
- Language: Persian

A Minor Leap Down (Persian: پریدن از ارتفاع کم, romanized: Paridan Az Ertefa-e Kam) is a 2015 Iranian drama film directed and written by Hamed Rajabi. It had its world premiere at the 65th Berlin International Film Festival in February 2015.

The film was released on March 18, 2015, in Iran theatrically.

== Premise ==
Nahal (Negar Javaherian), who is four months pregnant, suddenly realizes that the fetus has died in her belly. she keeps silent and decides not to tell anyone about this incident.

== Cast ==
- Negar Javaherian as Nahal
- Rambod Javan as Babak
- Mehri Al Agha as Nahal's mother
- Mahmoud Behrouzian as Nahal's father
- Sadaf Ahmadi as Negar
- Shafagh Shokri as Nahal's sister

== Reception ==
=== Accolades ===
Year	Award	Category	Recipient	Result	Ref.
2015	Berlin International Film Festival	FIPRESCI Prize (panorama)	Hamed Rajabi	Won	
2015	Berlin International Film Festival	Best First Feature Award	Hamed Rajabi	Nominated	
