= Taxi (2015 film) =

2015 Iranian docufiction film directed by Jafar Panahi

- Official poster for Taxi
- Directed by: Jafar Panahi
- Written by: Jafar Panahi
- Story by: Jafar Panahi
- Produced by: Jafar Panahi
- Starring: Jafar Panahi; Hana Saeidi
- Cinematography: Jafar Panahi
- Edited by: Jafar Panahi
- Music by: Mossoumeh Lahidji
- Production company: Jafar Panahi Film Productions
- Release date: 6 February 2015 (Berlin)
- Running time: 82 minutes
- Country: Iran
- Language: Persian
- Box office: $11,234,947

Taxi (full title Jafar Panahi's Taxi; Persian: تاکسی), also known as Taxi Tehran, is a 2015 Iranian docufiction starring and directed by Jafar Panahi. The film premiered in competition at the 65th Berlin International Film Festival, where it won the Golden Bear and the FIPRESCI Prize. As Panahi has been banned – since 2010 – by the Government of Iran from making films and traveling abroad, his niece Hana Saeidi, who also appears in the film, collected the award on his behalf.

== Plot ==
Taxi portrays director Jafar Panahi as he courses through the streets of Tehran while pretending to be a share taxi driver. He wants to hear a piece of his passengers' lives and declines any payment for the services. His earliest passengers include a conservative-minded man who supports capital punishment and a woman supporting its abolition, a pirated video vendor named Omid who once lent foreign films not available in the country to Panahi, an injured man and his wife who insist on recording a last will due to their panic, and a pair of superstitious old women wanting to release their goldfishes to a holy spring.

Eventually, Panahi picks up his niece, Hana, at her school. She discusses film-making and wants Panahi's advice on creating a short film for a school project; her teacher has talked about several rules on creating films in Iran, including the avoidance of siahnamayi, or portraying a dark image about the country. However, Hana's teacher also stated that people should create films as they see fit. The two stop near a coffeehouse where Panahi meets with a family friend he has not seen for seven years. The latter inquires about a burglary he recently experienced and his dilemma of not informing the authorities about the thieves, whom he personally knows, as they are poor and have nothing else to lose. Meanwhile, Hana films a case of siahnamayi herself when she spots a boy who picks up money that had been dropped on the road by a couple of newlyweds and initially refuses to return it.

Finally, Panahi and Hana meet with Nasrin Sotoudeh, a human rights lawyer about to see the imprisoned Ghoncheh Ghavami and possibly convince her to give up her hunger strike. While adjusting her seat, Hana stumbles upon a purse belonging to one of the old women with the goldfishes. Sotoudeh decides to leave early so Panahi can deliver the purse, but not before giving him a rose as a goodwill for filmmakers. Panahi and Hana proceed to the springs and are able to return the purse; at the same time as this happens, a pair of thieves (or government agents) ransack the taxi, before the film cuts off.

== Cast ==
- Jafar Panahi
- Hana Saeidi
- Nasrin Sotoudeh
- People from Tehran

== Production ==
Similar to Abbas Kiarostami's A Taste of Cherry (1997) and Ten (2002), Taxi has been described as "a portrait of the Iranian capital Tehran" and as a "documentary-like film [...] set in a Tehran taxi that is driven by Panahi" with passengers who "candidly confide[d]" to Panahi. According to Jean-Michel Frodon, the passengers include "Men and women, young and old, rich and poor, traditionalists and modernists, pirated video vendors, and advocates of human rights, [who sit] in the passenger seat of the inexperienced driver [who they refer to as] Harayé Panahi (Aghaye Panahi, آقای پناهی), 'Mr. Panahi'." The passengers are played by non-professional actors, whose identities remain anonymous. Human rights lawyer Nasrin Sotoudeh appears in the film. The 2014 detention of Ghoncheh Ghavami is discussed in the penultimate scene of the film.

Like his previous two films This Is Not a Film and Closed Curtain, the film was made despite Panahi's 20-year ban from making films. His previous two films had been shot in extreme secrecy in Panahi's apartment and in a private house. In this film Panahi filmed out in the open on the streets of Tehran.

Shortly after the film's premiere at Berlin was announced, Panahi released an official statement in which he promised to continue making films despite the ban and said "Nothing can prevent me from making films since when being pushed to the ultimate corners I connect with my inner-self and, in such private spaces, despite all limitations, the necessity to create becomes even more of an urge."

== Release ==
The film premiered in competition at the 65th Berlin International Film Festival on February 6, 2015.

=== Box office ===
The film opened in Italy on August 27, 2015 where it earned the ninth place spot, grossing $124,280 from 41 screens. It stayed in the ninth position the following week, but saw a 54% increase to end the weekend with $191,688 (thus bringing its take to $396,526). The movie dropped to 12th place in its third week with $122,970, while increasing the screen count to 82. Its three-week cumulative total is $597,093.

It opened in Austria where it has made $110,446 since opening on July 24, 2015.

The film has a worldwide box office total of $11,234,947.

== Reception ==
Taxi has an approval rating of 96% on review aggregator website Rotten Tomatoes, based on 107 reviews, and an average rating of 8.5/10. The website's critical consensus states: " Jafar Panahi's Taxi offers another round of trenchant societal commentary from a director whose entire filmography stands as a daring act of dissent". Metacritic assigned the film a weighted average score of 91 out of 100, based on 25 critics, indicating "universal acclaim".

Taxi won the Golden Bear prize at the 2015 Berlin International Film Festival. Because Panahi was legally unable to leave Iran to attend the festival, his niece Hana Saeidi (who appears in the film) was there to accept the award on his behalf. Berlin Jury president Darren Aronofsky described the film as "a love letter to cinema...filled with love for his art, his community, his country and his audience."

In an interview following the win at Berlin, Panahi pleaded with authorities to allow his film to be screened publicly in Iran. The Iranian government’s film branch, the Cinema Organisation, offered a statement that was at once celebratory and critical, congratulating Panahi for the win while accusing the Berlin Film Festival of spreading misunderstanding by awarding the prize to Panahi.

The film has been accused of Siahnamayi by conservatives in Iran.

== See also ==
- Guerrilla filmmaking
- Documentary comedy
- Docucomedy
- Metafilm
- No budget film
