= 13 Minutes (2015 film) =

2015 film

- Film poster
- Directed by: Oliver Hirschbiegel
- Written by: Fred Breinersdorfer; Léonie-Claire Breinersdorfer
- Produced by: Oliver Schündler; Boris Ausserer; Fred Breinersdorfer
- Starring: Christian Friedel
- Cinematography: Judith Kaufmann
- Edited by: Alexander Dittner
- Music by: David Holmes
- Production company: Lucky Bird Pictures
- Distributed by: NFP marketing & distribution
- Release dates: 12 February 2015 (Berlin); 9 April 2015 (Germany)
- Running time: 114 minutes
- Country: Germany
- Language: German

13 Minutes (German: Elser – Er hätte die Welt verändert) is a 2015 German drama film directed by Oliver Hirschbiegel that tells the true story of Georg Elser's failed attempt to assassinate Adolf Hitler in November 1939. The title of the film is drawn from the fact that Elser's bomb detonated in a venue that Hitler had left just 13 minutes before.

It was screened out of competition at the 65th Berlin International Film Festival. It was one of eight films shortlisted by Germany to be their submission for the Academy Award for Best Foreign Language Film at the 88th Academy Awards, but it lost out to Labyrinth of Lies.

== Plot ==
In November 1939, after planting a home-made bomb inside a column of a Munich Bierkeller, Georg Elser attempts to cross into neutral Switzerland but is caught at the border. His bomb detonates but misses killing German leader Adolf Hitler by just 13 minutes.

The German security services find incriminating evidence on Elser and link him to the assassination attempt. They believe Elser must have been working with a group of conspirators and proceed to torture Elser. They also round up members of his family from his home village, including Else Härlen, a married woman Elser has been seeing.

When Else is brought before Elser, he fears for her life and tells Kripo police chief Arthur Nebe and Gestapo head Heinrich Müller that he acted alone, procuring detonators from a steel factory and stealing dynamite from a nearby quarry. He outlines the two clockwork mechanisms he built to time the explosion and hopefully kill Hitler as he made a speech. Still not believed to have attempted the assassination alone, Elser is once more tortured using drugs (Pervitin), but with the same result as before—he insists that he acted alone.

Through flashbacks it is learned that Elser came to despise the Nazis and saw that Hitler needed to be removed to save Germany. Following his arrest, Elser was kept in concentration camps for five years and was shot a few days before American forces liberated Dachau concentration camp, a few weeks before the war ended. In his last days he hears that Arthur Nebe has been killed for his part in the July assassination plot.

Elser is now regarded as a German resistance hero of the Second World War.

== Cast ==
- Christian Friedel as Georg Elser
- Katharina Schüttler as Else Härlen
- Burghart Klaußner as Arthur Nebe
- Johann von Bülow as Heinrich Müller
- Felix Eitner as Eberle
- David Zimmerschied as Josef Schurr
- Rüdiger Klink as Erich
- Simon Licht as SS Obergruppenführer
- Cornelia Köndgen as Maria Elser
- Martin Maria Abram as Ludwig Elser
- Michael Kranz as Franz Xaver Lechner

== Critical reception ==
The film has been received generally positively by critics, holding a 76% approval rating on Rotten Tomatoes. The site's critical consensus reads, "13 Minutes explores an oft-neglected corner of World War II history with just enough craft and narrative momentum to offset a disappointing lack of subtlety." The review in The Guardian newspaper noted the film as "...a heartfelt study of a man who tried to kill Hitler". The newspaper was also very complimentary about Christian Friedel's performance as Elser.

However, the entertainment magazine Variety was less impressed, saying "... the absence of subtlety combined with predictable dollops of sentimentalism once again trivialize events in the name of making them understandable". In The Daily Telegraph's review, the reviewer noted the film as having an "...overbearing sentimentalism and lacquered, Oscar-hungry sheen".
