= The Cut (2014 drama film) =

2014 film

- German physical media poster
- Directed by: Fatih Akin
- Written by: Fatih Akin; Mardik Martin
- Produced by: Fatih Akin; Karl Baumgartner; Reinhard Brundig
- Starring: Tahar Rahim; Simon Abkarian; Makram Khoury
- Cinematography: Rainer Klausmann
- Edited by: Andrew Bird
- Music by: Alexander Hacke
- Production companies: Bombero International; Pyramide Productions; ARD Degeto Film; Anadolu Kültür; BIM Distribuzione; Corazón International; Dorje Film; France 3 Cinéma; International Traders; Jordan Films; Mars Media; Norddeutscher Rundfunk (NDR); Opus Film; Pandora Filmproduktion; Zaman Productions
- Distributed by: Pandora Film Verleih (Germany); Pyramide Distribution (France); BIM Distribuzione (Italy)
- Release dates: 31 August 2014 (Venice); 16 October 2014 (Germany)
- Running time: 138 minutes
- Countries: Germany; France; Italy; Russia; Poland; Canada; Turkey; Jordan
- Languages: Armenian; Arabic; English; Turkish; Kurdish; Spanish
- Budget: €16 million
- Box office: $1 million

The Cut is a 2014 drama film directed by Fatih Akin, co-written by Akin and Mardik Martin. Starring Tahar Rahim, it follows Nazareth Manoogian during the Armenian genocide and its repercussions in different parts of the world.

The film had its world premiere in the main competition of the 71st Venice International Film Festival on 31 August 2014, where it was nominated for the Golden Lion. It was theatrically released in Germany on 16 October 2014 by Pandora Film Verleih.

== Plot ==
The film starts by showing Nazareth's life as a blacksmith in the city of Mardin, where he used to live with his family. Although Nazareth had his suspicions about possible effects of World War I, and he was considering the possibility of non-Muslim minorities of the Ottoman Empire being conscripted to fight in the army, his family and friends were trying to be optimistic, although they had heard stories about men from different villages disappearing. One night, Ottoman soldiers came to his door and took him to work for the army at a road construction, which was in the middle of an uninhabited area. While was working there and as time passed by, he and his friends started to notice different groups of passer-by Armenians under arrest. They even witnessed a rape. At one point, an Ottoman officer came to their camp and asked them if they would accept to convert to Islam and being set free. Some did and some did not. The officer and his fellows took the converts and left. Some soldiers and convicts, recruited solely to kill Armenians, arrived the next day to kill the rest. The convict responsible for cutting Nazareth's throat could not go along with it and made only a small cut on his throat, which made him faint and, presumed dead, he survived the massacre. However, while saving his life, the cut also made him mute. This "cut" not only symbolizes Nazareth's becoming mute but also his being cut from his life and family and the Armenian society's silence about the Genocide at the time.

His executioner, who was an Ottoman subject, returned and took Nazareth, and both joined a gang composed of former defectors. This gang is mainly formed by Ottoman Turks, based on their clear accent, yet they were willing to take Nazareth with them, which is a sign that the ordinary people did not have any problems and the Genocide was substantially based on political will and motive. While trying to continue his life with the gang, Nazareth came across an old customer from Mardin, who informed him that surviving Armenians went to Raʾs al-ʿAin, which became one of several cities Nazareth visited to trace his family. When he concluded that everyone in his family had died he was devastated and unsure about what to do. At that point, he met a soap maker from Aleppo, called Umair Nasreddin. The soap maker provided refuge to not only Nazareth but also many Armenians, which can also be interpreted as a metaphor: bystanders to the Genocide cleansing their guilt by helping the surviving victims. It is in Aleppo that Nazareth learned that his daughters might still be alive and set out to find them first in Lebanon, then in Cuba and finally in Ruso, North Dakota, United States.

== Cast ==
- Tahar Rahim as Nazaret Manoogian
- Simon Abkarian as Krikor
- Makram Khoury as Omar Nasreddin
- Hindi Zahra as Rakel
- Kevork Malikyan as Hagob Nakashian
- Bartu Küçükçağlayan as Mehmet
- Zein Fakhoury as Arsinée
- Dina Fakhoury as Lucinée
- Trine Dyrholm as Orphanage Headmistress
- Arsinée Khanjian as Mrs. Nakashian
- Akin Gazi as Hrant
- George Georgiou as Vahan
- Numan Acar as Manuel
- Anna Savva as Mrs. Krikorian

== Critical reception ==
On the review aggregator website Rotten Tomatoes, 58% of 26 critics' reviews are positive. The website's consensus reads: "Ambitious and well-intentioned, The Cut is visually arresting and at times, even emotionally piercing, but ultimately fails to transcend." Metacritic gave the film a score of 56 out of 100, based on reviews from 7 critics, indicating "Mixed or average reviews".

=== Accolades ===
Award	Date	Category	Recipient	Result	Ref.
Venice Film Festival	2014	Golden Lion	The Cut	Nominated	
Venice Film Festival	2014	Vittorio Veneto Film Festival Award – Special Mention	The Cut	Won	
Gijón International Film Festival	2014	Grand Prix Asturias: Best Film	The Cut	Nominated	
German Film Awards	19 June 2015	Best Costume Design	Katrin Aschendorf	Nominated	
German Film Awards	19 June 2015	Best Makeup	Waldemar Pokromski, Sabine Schumann	Nominated	
German Film Awards	19 June 2015	Best Film Music	Alexander Hacke	Nominated	
Sofia International Film Festival	2015	Audience Award Silver Sea-Gull	The Cut	Won	
CPH PIX	2015	Politiken Audience Award	The Cut	Nominated	
