= Sebastian Schipper =

German actor and filmmaker (born 1968)

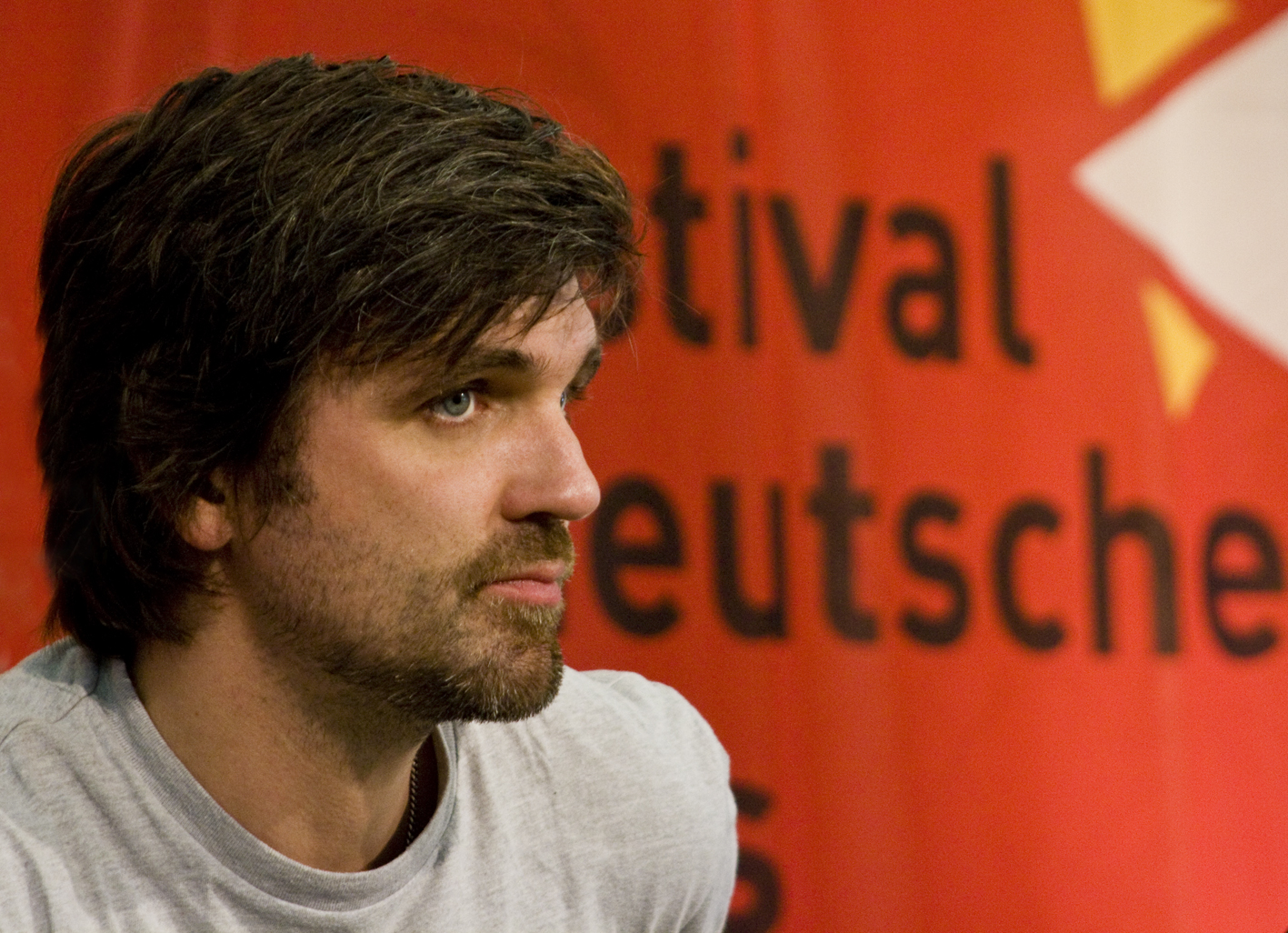
- Schipper at the 2009 Festival des deutschen Films
- Born: Sebastian Schipper; 8 May 1968 (age 58); Hanover, West Germany
- Education: Otto Falckenberg School of the Performing Arts
- Occupations: Filmmaker; actor
- Years active: 1992–present

Sebastian Schipper (born 8 May 1968) is a German actor and filmmaker.

== Life and career ==
Sebastian Schipper studied acting at the Otto Falckenberg Schule in Munich from 1992 to 1995. He got his first film role in Sönke Wortmann's Little Sharks from 1992. He debuted as director with Absolute Giganten from 1999, which received the second place prize for the German Film Award for Best Fiction Film. It was co-produced by Tom Tykwer, who has cast Schipper in several of his own films. Schipper's 2009 film Sometime in August is loosely based on Johann Wolfgang von Goethe's novel Elective Affinities. His fourth film as director is Victoria, a film about a night in a Berlin nightclub gone awry, shot in one continuous take. It played at the 65th Berlin International Film Festival and won in six categories at the German Film Award 2015, including Best Film and Best Direction.

== Filmography ==
As actor

- 1992: Little Sharks (Kleine Haie) - Hamlet
- 1996: The English Patient - Interrogation Room Soldier #1
- 1997: Winter Sleepers (Winterschläfer) - Otto
- 1998: Eine ungehorsame Frau (TV Movie) - Niklas
- 1998: Run Lola Run (Lola rennt) - Mike
- 1998: Das merkwürdige Verhalten geschlechtsreifer Großstädter zur Paarungszeit - Andi
- 1999: Fremde Freundin - Matthias
- 2000: England! - Galerist
- 2000: The Princess and the Warrior (Der Krieger und die Kaiserin) - Security Typ 1
- 2002: Elephant Heart - Baerwald
- 2003: Ganz und gar - Physiotherapeut Frank
- 2004: Nightsongs - Baste
- 2005: A Quiet Love - Biskup
- 2010: Three (Drei) - Simon
- 2012: Überleben an der Wickelfront (TV Movie) - Chefredakteur
- 2012: Ludwig II - Ludwig II. im Alter
- 2013: Alaska Johansson (TV Movie) - Chefredakteur
- 2013-2015: Tatort - Kommissar Jan Katz
- 2014: Inbetween Worlds - Constantin Lemarchal (uncredited)
- 2014: I Am Here - Peter
- 2015: Coconut Hero - Frank Burger
- 2024: Sad Jokes

As director and writer

- 1999: Absolute Giganten
- 2006: A Friend of Mine (Ein Freund von mir)
- 2009: Sometime in August (Mitte Ende August)
- 2015: Victoria
- 2019: Roads
