= Tough Love (2015 film) =

2015 film

- Theatrical release poster
- Directed by: Rosa von Praunheim
- Written by: Nicolas Woche; Jürgen Lemke; Rosa von Praunheim
- Produced by: Rosa von Praunheim
- Cinematography: Nicolai Zörn; Elfi Mikesch
- Edited by: Mike Shepard
- Music by: Andreas Wolter
- Release date: 2015
- Running time: 89 minutes
- Country: Germany
- Language: German

Tough Love (German: Härte) is a 2015 German semi-documentary drama film directed by Rosa von Praunheim and starring Hanno Koffler, Luise Heyer and Katy Karrenbauer. For example, the film was screened at the 2015 Montreal World Film Festival and at the Hong Kong International Film Festival in the same year.

== Plot ==
Andreas (Hanno Koffler) was physically mistreated by his father from a young age, while his mother (Katy Karrenbauer) sexually molested him for years. Traumatized by these experiences of violence and rape, he slipped into crime as a young man and earned his money as a brutal pimp. But the police noticed him. After an outbreak of violence, Andreas ends up in prison, where he manages to come to terms with his past over the years, also with the help of his faithful girlfriend Marion (Luise Heyer). From then on he did everything he could to get out of crime and the prostitution scene. Later he takes action against what he had to go through himself: the physical, sexual and psychological abuse of children.

== Awards ==
- 2015: Katy Karrenbauer was honored for her acting performance with the special prize of the German Film Academy "Jaeger-LeCoultre Homage to German Film"
- 2015: Hanno Koffler was nominated for the German Film Award as best male leading actor
- 2015: Nomination for the Gold Hugo at the Chicago International Film Festival
- 2015: Third place in the Panorama Audience Award of the Berlin International Film Festival

== Reception ==
The culture magazine Kunst+Film wrote that the title would do the film credit: "Like its protagonist, it portrays the dazzling life of its protagonist harshly and relentlessly." The minimalist setting of the film was praised as a successful stylistic device, this "restriction to the essentials characterizes intense atmospheric density [...]. In addition, Praunheim has found wonderful actors. Katy Karrenbauer as a mother shows great courage to face unsympathetic ugliness with full, even naked, physical exertion. Hanno Koffler as young Andreas is just as convincing as Luise Heyer as his long-term girlfriend Marion."
