= Ben Böhmer =

German DJ (born 1993)

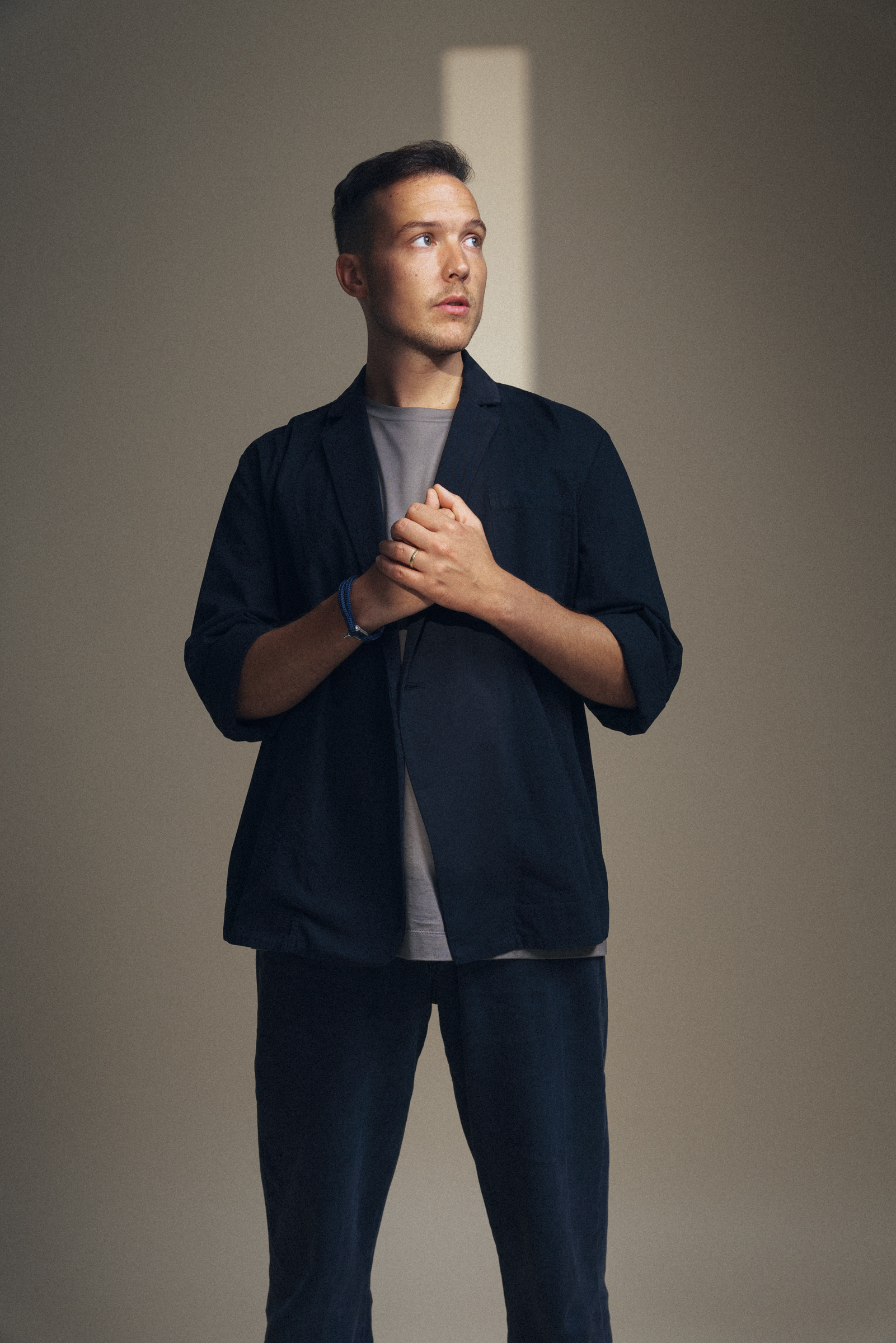
- Böhmer in 2022

Background information
- Born: Ben Böhmer-Bärtels; 1993 (age 32–33)
- Origin: Göttingen, Germany
- Genres: Melodic house, progressive house
- Occupations: DJ; record producer; remixer
- Years active: 2015–present
- Labels: Anjunadeep; Ton Töpferei; Keller Records; Cercle; Ninja Tune
- Spouse: Samaya Böhmer (m.2022–present)
- Website: https://www.benbohmermusic.com

Ben Böhmer (born 1993) is a German DJ, producer and remixer from Göttingen, Germany. He primarily produces and performs indie electronica and melodic house music, and has released tracks on labels Ninja Tune, Anjunadeep, Keller Records, and Cercle Music. He lives in Berlin.

== Career ==
Böhmer played piano and trumpet during his childhood before he began composing music with the synthesizer.

At the end of 2015 he produced his first single, "Promise You", which appeared on the Mauerblümchen (Ger., wallflower) compilation of the label Ton Töpferei, based in his hometown of Göttingen, Germany. On November 1, 2016, the eponymous Promise You EP, also on Ton Töpferei, was released. This was followed by other releases on Keller Records, Ostfunk Records, Bade Records, Audiolith Records, Carton-Pate Records, The Soundgarden Records and Freundchen Records.

After witnessing some success, Böhmer's Submission EP was released in 2017 on the label Sacrebleu, headed by German DJ duo AKA AKA, which was founded in the same year.

On 22 September 2017, Böhmer published the single Flug & Fall on the fourth exploration compilation of the London label Anjunadeep. Shortly thereafter in early 2018, another release, the Morning Falls EP, followed.

In November 2019, he released his debut LP, Breathing, on the label Anjunadeep.

In September 2021, Böhmer released his second studio album, Begin Again, via Anjunadeep.

== Discography ==
=== Albums ===
- 2019: Breathing [Anjunadeep]
- 2020: Live from Printworks London [Anjunadeep]
- 2020: Breathing (Remixed) [Anjunadeep]
- 2021: Begin Again [Anjunadeep]
- 2022: Begin Again (Remixed) [Anjunadeep]
- 2022: Live at the Roundhouse, London [Anjunadeep]
- 2024: Bloom [Ninja Tune]

=== EPs ===
- 2014: Black Pattern EP [Bade Records]
- 2016: Der Blender [Keller]
- 2016: Promise You EP [Ton Töpferei]
- 2016: Promise You (Remixes) [Ton Töpferei]
- 2017: Dissensions [Freundchen]
- 2017: Submission [Sacrebleu]
- 2017: Dissensions (Remixes) [Ton Töpferei]
- 2018: Morning Falls EP [Anjunadeep]
- 2018: Challenger [Freundchen]
- 2018: Dive EP [Anjunadeep]
- 2019: Fliederregen / Reflection [This Never Happened]
- 2020: Phases EP [Anjunadeep]
- 2022: The Apparitions – Ben Böhmer, Rob Moose [Anjunadeep]

=== Singles ===
- 2014: Schachmatt [Ostfunk Records]
- 2014: Faltering [Ostfunk Records]
- 2017: Purple Line [Keller]
- 2017: Flug & Fall [Anjunadeep]
- 2017: Wechselwerk [Hold Your Ground]
- 2017: Zweisamkeit [Rebellion der Träumer]
- 2018: Mondfinsternis [Keller]
- 2018: Lifespan – Ben Böhmer, Timo Jahns [Einmusika Recordings]
- 2018: Ground Control [Anjunadeep]
- 2018: Korona – Ben Böhmer, Wood [Ton Töpferei]
- 2019: Rye – Ben Böhmer, Fritz Kalkbrenner [Anjunadeep]
- 2019: Gibberish – Luttrell, Ben Böhmer (feat. Margret) [Anjunadeep]
- 2019: Breathing – Ben Böhmer, Nils Hoffmann (feat. Malou) [Anjunadeep]
- 2019: Black Hole – Ben Böhmer, Monolink [Anjunadeep]
- 2019: Hunting – Ben Böhmer (feat. Jonah) [Anjunadeep]
- 2020: Second Sun – Nils Hoffmann, Ben Böhmer [Poesie Musik]
- 2020: Bright – Fritz Kalkbrenner, Ben Böhmer [BMG Rights Management GmbH]
- 2020: Where the Roads Collide – Fritz Kalkbrenner, Ben Böhmer [BMG Rights Management GmbH]
- 2020: Just the One – Fritz Kalkbrenner, Ben Böhmer [BMG Rights Management GmbH]
- 2020: SF to Berlin – Spencer Brown, Ben Böhmer [Anjunabeats]
- 2020: Cappadocia – Ben Böhmer (feat. Romain Garcia) [Cercle Records]
- 2021: Run Away – Ben Böhmer, Tinlicker (feat. Felix Raphael) [Anjunadeep]
- 2021: Weightless – Ben Böhmer, Panama [Future Classic]
- 2021: Beyond Beliefs [Anjunadeep]
- 2021: Escalate – Ben Böhmer (feat. Jonah) [Anjunadeep]
- 2021: Erase – Ben Böhmer (feat. lau.ra) [Anjunadeep]
- 2021: A Matter of Time [Anjunadeep]
- 2022: Home (An Apparition) – Ben Böhmer, Rob Moose (feat. Jonah) [Anjunadeep]
- 2022: Voodoo – Tinlicker, Ben Böhmer [Anjunadeep]
- 2023: One Last Call – Ben Böhmer (feat. Felix Raphael) [Ninja Tune]
- 2024: Best Life – Ben Böhmer (feat. Jonah) [Ninja Tune]
- 2024: Hiding – Ben Böhmer (feat. Lykke Li) [Ninja Tune]
- 2024: Rust [Ninja Tune]
- 2024: Faithless – Ben Böhmer (feat. Erin LeCount) [Ninja Tune]
- 2024: The Sun – Ben Böhmer (feat. Oh Wonder) [Ninja Tune]
- 2025: Caught Up In The Fire – Ben Böhmer (feat. Jonah) [Ninja Tune]

=== Remixes ===
- 2015: Supertriangle – Brigade (Ben Böhmer Remix) [Keller]
- 2015: Shallow – Bongbeck (Ben Böhmer Remix) [Keller]
- 2016: Winter Sleep – Bongbeck (Ben Böhmer Remix) [Ton Töpferei]
- 2016: Kolibri – Brigade, Niels Poensgen (Ben Böhmer Remix) [Ton Töpferei]
- 2017: Irs13 – Wood (Ben Böhmer Remix) [Ton Töpferei]
- 2017: Like Gilles Said – Anton Dhouran, Rafael Cerato (Ben Böhmer Remix) [The Soundgarden]
- 2017: Ruka – MR H's (Ben Böhmer Remix) [Carton-Pate Records]
- 2018: Lullaby Horizon – Way Out West (Ben Böhmer Remix) [Anjunadeep]
- 2018: Northern Soul – Above & Beyond (feat. Richard Bedford) (Ben Böhmer Remix) [Anjunabeats]
- 2018: Lost Tribe – Koelle (Ben Böhmer Remix) [Ton Töpferei]
- 2018: Drift – Nils Hoffmann (Ben Böhmer Remix) [Poesie Musik]
- 2018: Highlands – Studio Rauschenberg (Ben Böhmer Remix) [Lukins]
- 2018: The Space in Between – Jan Blomqvist (Ben Böhmer Remix) [Armada Electronic Elements]
- 2018: Hold On – Lane 8 (feat. Fractures) (Ben Böhmer Remix) [This Never Happened]
- 2018: Father Ocean – Monolink (Ben Böhmer Remix) [Embassy One]
- 2020: Moments – Kidnap (feat. Leo Stannard) (Ben Böhmer & Nils Hoffmann Remix) [Armada Electronic Elements]
- 2020: Perfect in a Way – Booka Shade, Kaktus Einarsson (Ben Böhmer Remix) [Blaufield Music]
- 2020: How Often – Lane 8 (feat. Kauf) (Ben Böhmer Remix) [This Never Happened]
- 2020: Red Dressed – Worakls (feat. Eivør) (Ben Böhmer Remix) [Hungry Music]
- 2021: Callisto – Stephan Bodzin, Marc Romboy (Ben Böhmer Remix) [Systematic Recordings]
- 2021: From the Back of a Cab – Rostam (Ben Böhmer Remix) [Matsor Projects]
- 2022: Lll – Stephan Bodzin (Ben Böhmer Remix) [Herzblut Recordings]
