= NTO (musician) =

French electronic music composer

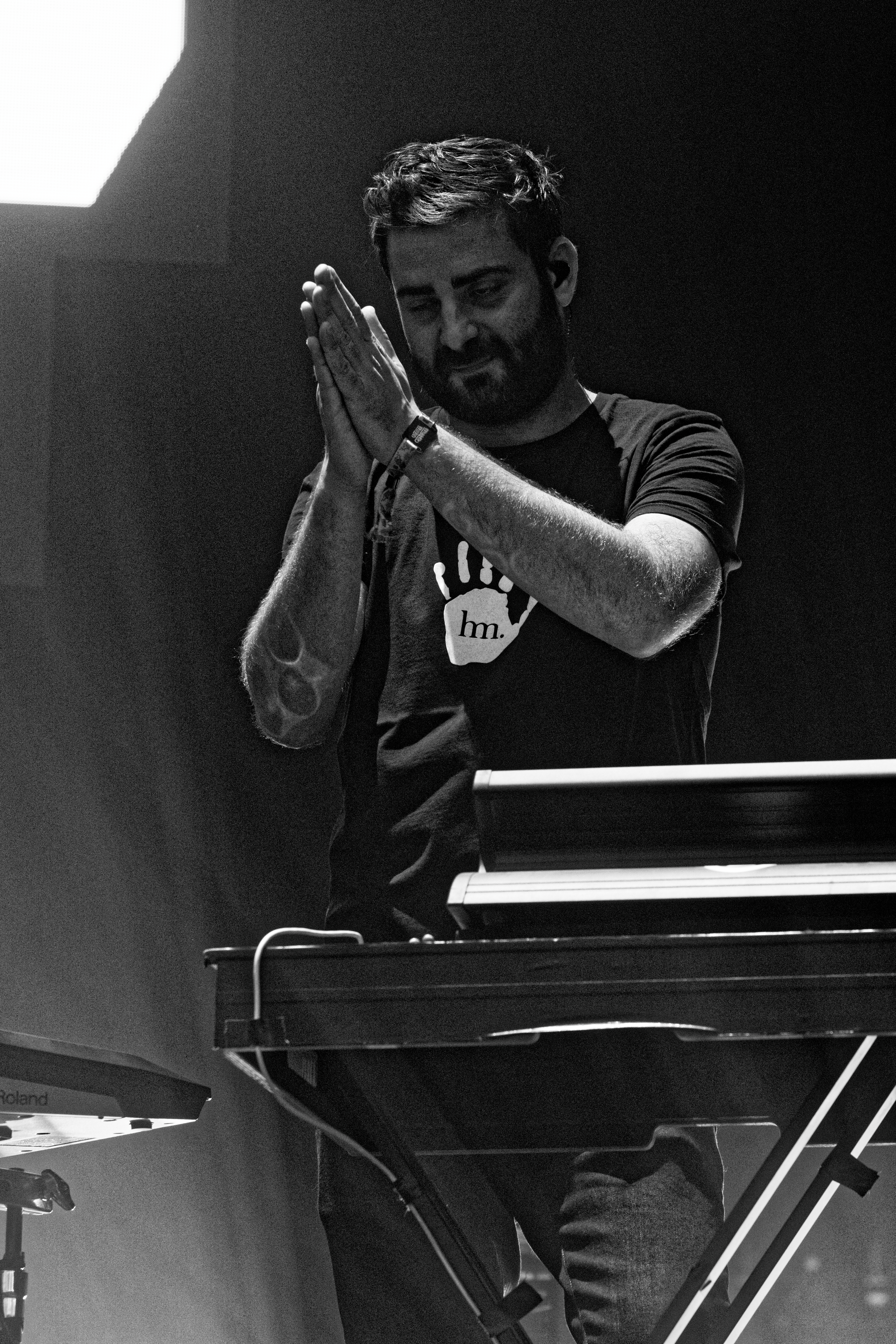
- NTO in 2018

Background information
- Born: Anthony Favier; 1985 (age 40–41); Marseille, France
- Occupations: DJ; record producer; musician
- Labels: Hungry Music; AllPoints

Anthony Favier (born 1985), known by his stage name NTO, is a French electronic music producer and composer known for his work in melodic and minimal techno. He first became active in the 2000s and has released music both as a solo artist and as a duo with french pianist Sofiane Pamart and as a member of the collective Hungry Music with Worakls and Joachim Pastor.

== Early life ==
Anthony Favier was born in 1985 in Marseille, France. He grew up listening to a range of musical influences, including video-game soundtracks and rock music. As a teenager he began playing guitar, and around the age of 16–17 discovered computer-assisted music production, realising he could create music without a professional studio. He later pursued studies in graphic design.

== Career ==
=== Early career and Hungry Music ===
Anthony Favier, then performing as N'to, released his debut EP Traque on the independent French label Basilic Records in 2008, followed by Turn You On in 2009 and Trauma in 2010. The name "N'to" derives from the southern-accented pronunciation of his nickname "Antho" used by his friends.

In 2013, he co-founded the label and artist collective Hungry Music with Worakls and Joachim Pastor. They released melodic electronic music across genres such as electronica, downtempo, deep house, and tech house.

In 2020, Favier left Hungry Music on good terms to join Believe Music and prepare his first studio album, focusing on a solo trajectory under the name "NTO". He performs exclusively his own compositions in concert, describing himself primarily as a composer rather than a DJ.

=== Apnea (2021) ===
NTO released his debut album Apnea in 2021 on AllPoints, a label of Believe. The album blends minimal techno with guitar elements, keyboards, and vocal collaborations, including tracks with Monolink, Tricky, Louise, and French 79.

The single "Invisible" was accompanied by a music video and later remixed by Paul Kalkbrenner. According to Favier, the album was influenced in part by freediving, introduced to him by world champion Arthur Guérin.

=== Forever Friends (2024) ===
Favier reunited with AllPoints for Forever Friends, a collaborative album with French pianist Sofiane Pamart. The project combines melodic techno with classical piano.

== Musical style ==
NTO's work is associated with melodic techno or minimal techno-house. His compositions are characterised by repetitive structures, bass-driven rhythms, and evolving melodic motifs. He cites Mediterranean landscapes, particularly Marseille and Corsica, as significant sources of inspiration in his creative process.

His artistic influences include Django Reinhardt, Georges Brassens, Pink Floyd, Underworld, Stephan Bodzin, James Holden, and Paul Kalkbrenner. His interest in electronic music intensified after hearing Underworld's live album Everything Everything (2000) and attending the Sziget Festival, experiences he describes as pivotal in shaping his musical direction.

== Discography ==
=== Studio albums ===
- Apnea (2021)
- Forever Friends (2024) (with Sofiane Pamart)
- NAKED (2026)

=== EPs ===
- Traque (2008)
- Turn you On (2009)
- Jane (2011)
- Cats and Dogs (2011)
- Stupid EP (2011)
- Noune Remixes (2012)
- The Bosnian EP (2014)
- Purple EP (2015)
- Starlings (2016)
- [ ] (2025)

=== Singles ===
- "Monkey's hug" (2009)
- "Trauma" (2010)
- "Every Wall is a Door / The Gloomies" (2012)
- "1825" (2014)
- "Utopia" (2014) (released alongside Worakls "Porto" as a double A side)
- "Monkey Man" (2014)
- "Petite/Ayahuasca" (2014)
- "Time/Chez Nous" (2015)
- "Plien Ciel" (2015)
- "La clé des champs" (2016)
- "Note blanche" (2016)
- "Carrousel" (2017)
- "The Hound" (2017)
- "Croche" (2018)
- "Alter Ego" (2018)
- "Charlie" (2018)
- "The Morning After" (2019)
- "Lac de Soi" (2020)
- "The Kid and the Planes" (2020)
- "Zig Zag" (2021)
- "Invisible" (2021) – also remixed by Paul Kalkbrenner
- "Beyond Control" (2021) (with Monolink)
- "Seasons" (2021) (with French79)
- "Petit Matin" (2021)
- "Loving You Like Always" (2022)
- "Les Orangers" (2023)
- "Coeur Noir" (2024) (with Vitalic)
- "Aura" (2024) (with Gordo)
- "No One Should Walk Alone" (2025) (with Sofiane Pamart)
- "Loyalty (Cercle Odyssey Live Version) (2025) (with Sofiane Pamart)
- "Fior Di Macchia" (2026)
- "I Cared for You" (2026) [with Mont Rouge and Noah Kuluga)
- "Myosotis" (2026)
- "Validation, Medication" (2026) (with Sailor & I)
- "Viento" (2026) (with Sinego)
- "Alegria" (2026) (with Romain Garcia)
