= Hannes Stöhr =

German film director and screenwriter (born 1970)

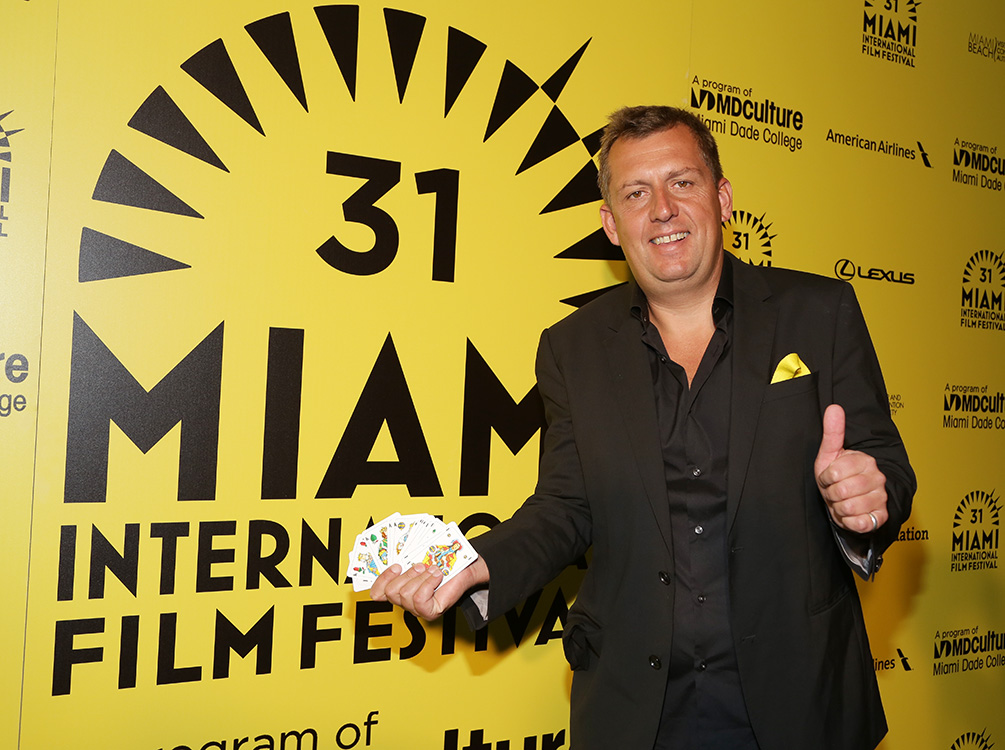
- Stöhr in 2014
- Born: 1970 (age 55–56); Stuttgart, Germany
- Occupations: Director, screenwriter
- Years active: 2001–present

Hannes Stöhr (born 1970) is a German film director and screenwriter. He studied scriptwriting and directing at the Deutsche Film- und Fernsehakademie Berlin from 1994 to 1999. In 2006 Stöhr was a Villa Aurora grant recipient and lived for six months in Los Angeles, California. Hannes speaks German, Spanish, English, French and Portuguese. Stöhr lectured film (2005–2019) at Film Academy Baden-Württemberg, Deutsche Film- und Fernsehakademie Berlin and the Goethe Institute.He lives in Berlin and Stuttgart. Since 2019 Hannes Stöhr is Professor at Stuttgart Media University and founded there the international storytelling minor im the audiovisual media programme. Hannes Stöhr is member of the Deutsche Filmakademie and the European Film Academy.

== Career ==
Stöhr's first cinema feature Berlin Is in Germany won the Panorama Audience award at the International Berlin Filmfestival 2001, the German critics association award, the Studio Hamburg award, and many others. Main actor Jörg Schüttauf won the German Film critics association award for his performance in Berlin Is in Germany. Berlin is in Germany was a box office hit in Germany and was distributed in France, Spain, Turkey and other countries. "Berlin Is in Germany is a film about change, says its director, Hannes Stöhr, in an impeccable Spanish learned in Colombia, Mexico and Galicia" comments el Pais.

His second feature One Day in Europe a European comedy starring Rachida Brakni, Florian Lukas, Péter Scherer, Erdal Yıldız, Megan Gay, Miguel de Lira, Luis Tosar and others screened in Berlinale competition and was distributed in Great Britain, Russia, Spain, Japan and other countries. The BBC writes about One Day in Europe: "This is a movie full of touching, funny moments." Stoehr worked together with director of photography Florian Hoffmeister, a fellow student and friend of Berlin film school, in his first two feature films Berlin Is in Germany and One Day in Europe.

Stoehr's third cinema feature film, the techno musicfilm Berlin Calling starring Paul Kalkbrenner, Rita Lengyel, Corinna Harfouch and Araba Walton had its international Premiere on Piazza Grande at the Locarno Film festival 2008. Berlin Calling ran for several years in German cinemas and was also released in Italy, Poland, Hungary, Argentina, Chile and other countries. In 2010 the film won the Arte Audience award. Berlin Calling was partly shot in two Berlin nightclubs, Bar 25 and Maria am Ostbahnhof. The American magazine Rolling Stone called Berlin Calling "the hit film about a DJ in the city's exploding techno scene at the turn of the millennium." The title song of Berlin calling named Sky and Sand entered the charts in several European countries. 2009 the film Berlin Calling was chosen to showcase Berlin in New York.

Looking back Hannes said that he can see his first three feature films as forming a trilogy: "Berlin Is in Germany shows Berlin viewed from the alien perspective, One Day in Europe shows Berlin in the European context, and Berlin Calling is now the view from within."

In 2012 Stoehr contributed the part Berlin Night window to the French Production "Hopper vu par" about the American Realism painter Edward Hopper. His tragicomedy Global Player was filmed in Shanghai and Hechingen, the home town of Hannes Stöhr. The film screened at the Miami International Filmfesival 2014 among other film festivals. It was Hannes third visit at the Miami International Film festival. The film was also adapted as a theatre play. In 2023 he wrote and directed the theatre play “Marlene Dietrich in Hollywood”, which he staged in 2023 with the Theater Lindenhof. The play focuses on Marlene Dietrich's time in Hollywood and also honors Carl Laemmle. His Western screenplay Forty-Eighters, written 2006 in Los Angeles tells a story of German Americans in the American Civil War. In 2025 Hannes Stöhr was, together with Laura Gómez and Teresa Guerrero, member of the jury of the ecological filmfestival FICMEC (Festival Internacional de Cine Medioambiental de Canarias) on the Canary Islands He also was invited to be part of the documentary programme CREADOC on the canary islands in 2025–26.
