= One Day in Europe =

2005 film by Hannes Stöhr

- Theatrical release poster
- Directed by: Hannes Stöhr
- Written by: Hannes Stöhr
- Produced by: Sigrid Hoerner; Anne Leppin
- Starring: Megan Gay; Luidmila Tsvetkova; Florian Lukas; Erdal Yıldız; Péter Scherer; Miguel de Lira; Rachida Brakni; Boris Arquier
- Cinematography: Florian Hoffmeister
- Edited by: Anne Fabini
- Music by: Florian Appl
- Production companies: Moneypenny Filmproduktion; Filmanova
- Distributed by: Piffl Medien (Germany); Notro Films (Spain)
- Release dates: 12 February 2005 (Berlin); 7 April 2005 (Germany); 2 June 2006 (Spain)
- Running time: 95 minutes
- Countries: Germany; Spain
- Languages: German; Galician; Russian; Turkish; Spanish; French; English

One Day in Europe is a 2005 comedy anthology film written and directed by Hannes Stöhr. It is an international co-production between Germany and Spain. The film had its world premiere at the 55th Berlin International Film Festival, where it was nominated for the Golden Bear award. It was released theatrically in Germany on 7 April 2005 by Piffl Medien and in Spain on 2 June 2006 by Notro Films.

== Plot ==
One Day in Europe consists of four stories about communication misunderstanding which take place on a single day in four cities (Berlin, Istanbul, Moscow and Santiago de Compostela). The Champions League match between Galatasaray and Deportivo La Coruña which takes place in Moscow on that particular day only worsens the problem.

The film shows how four tourists in four places interact with the local police after being robbed or staging a robbery with the intent to collect a police report to be used to claim insurance. The football match actually plays a silent role in the film showing how the policemen are engrossed in the game and care little for the loss of the tourist.

== Cast ==
Moscow

- Megan Gay as Kate
- Luidmila Tsvetkova as Elena
- Andrey Sokolov as Andrej
- Oleg Assadulin as the Asian officer
- Vita Saval as the female officer
- Nikolai Svechnikov as the highranking officer
- Luis Tosar as Deportivo fan

Istanbul

- Florian Lukas as Rokko
- Erdal Yıldız as Celal
- Nuray Sahin as the female officer
- Ahmet Mümtaz Taylan as the highranking officer

Santiago de Compostela

- Péter Scherer as Gabor
- Miguel de Lira as Sergeant Barreira
- Goldi Martinez as Cabo Lucas
- Mónica García as Agent Ana
- Víctor Mosqueira as the thief
- Marta Pazos as the lover
- Blanca Cendán as Rosalia
- Patricia de Lorenzo as the owner of the tavern
- Jesus Ron and Kalin Foz as guests in the tavern

Berlin

- Rachida Brakni as Rachida
- Boris Arquier as Claude
- Kirsten Block as the female officer
- Tom Jahn as the male officer
- Facundo Diab as Facundo
