= Sky and Sand =

Single by Paul & Fritz Kalkbrenner

from the album Berlin Calling – The Soundtrack
- B-side: "Azure" (by Paul Kalkbrenner)
- Released: 16 February 2009
- Recorded: 2008
- Genre: Chillout, deep house, dub techno
- Length: 3:54
- Label: BPitch Control
- Songwriters: Paul Kalkbrenner; Fritz Kalkbrenner
- Producer: Paul Kalkbrenner

Paul Kalkbrenner singles chronology
"Bingo Bongo" (2008)	"Sky and Sand" (2009)	"Das Gezabel" (2012)

"Sky and Sand" is a song by German electronic music producers Paul Kalkbrenner and Fritz Kalkbrenner. The song was originally produced as the title song of the German movie Berlin Calling written and directed by Hannes Stöhr. It was first released on the Berlin Calling movie soundtrack album in October 2008 and in February 2009 as a single.

The song entered the charts in several European countries, and it was certified platinum by the Federation of the Italian Music Industry. It reached number two in the Belgian Ultratop 50. In Germany it was the longest running chart song of all time spending 129 weeks inside the German singles charts and is still the longest running chart song of domestic origin. Only "Last Christmas" by Wham! (from the United Kingdom) lasted longer (140 weeks).

The song was used within a house party scene in The Lazarus Project (S1, E2).

== Charts ==
=== Weekly charts ===
Chart (2009–2022)	Peak position
Austria (Ö3 Austria Top 40)	37
Belgium (Ultratop 50 Flanders)	2
Belgium (Ultratop 50 Wallonia)	11
France (SNEP)	146
Germany (GfK)	29
Hungary (Dance Top 40)	4
Hungary (Single Top 40)	33
Netherlands (Dutch Top 40)	12
Netherlands (Single Top 100)	7
Switzerland (Schweizer Hitparade)	56

=== Year-end charts ===
Chart (2009)	Position
Belgium (Ultratop Flanders)	8
Belgium (Ultratop Wallonia)	50
Netherlands (Dutch Top 40)	79
Netherlands (Single Top 100)	38
Chart (2010)	Position
Hungary (Dance Top 40)	21
Chart (2011)	Position
Germany (Official German Charts)	87
Hungary (Dance Top 40)	23
