= Cercle =

Cercle is French for circle. It can refer to:

- Circle (administrative division)
- Cercle (French colonial), an administrative unit of the French Overseas Empire
- Cercle (Mali), the Malian administrative unit
  - The specific Cercles of Mali
- Cercle Brugge KSV, a Belgian football club from Bruges
- Le Cercle, a foreign policy think-tank specialising in international security
- In Belgium, Cercles are Student Societies based around each faculty
- Cercle (company), a French music company
