= Simina Grigoriu =

Ana Simina Kalkbrenner
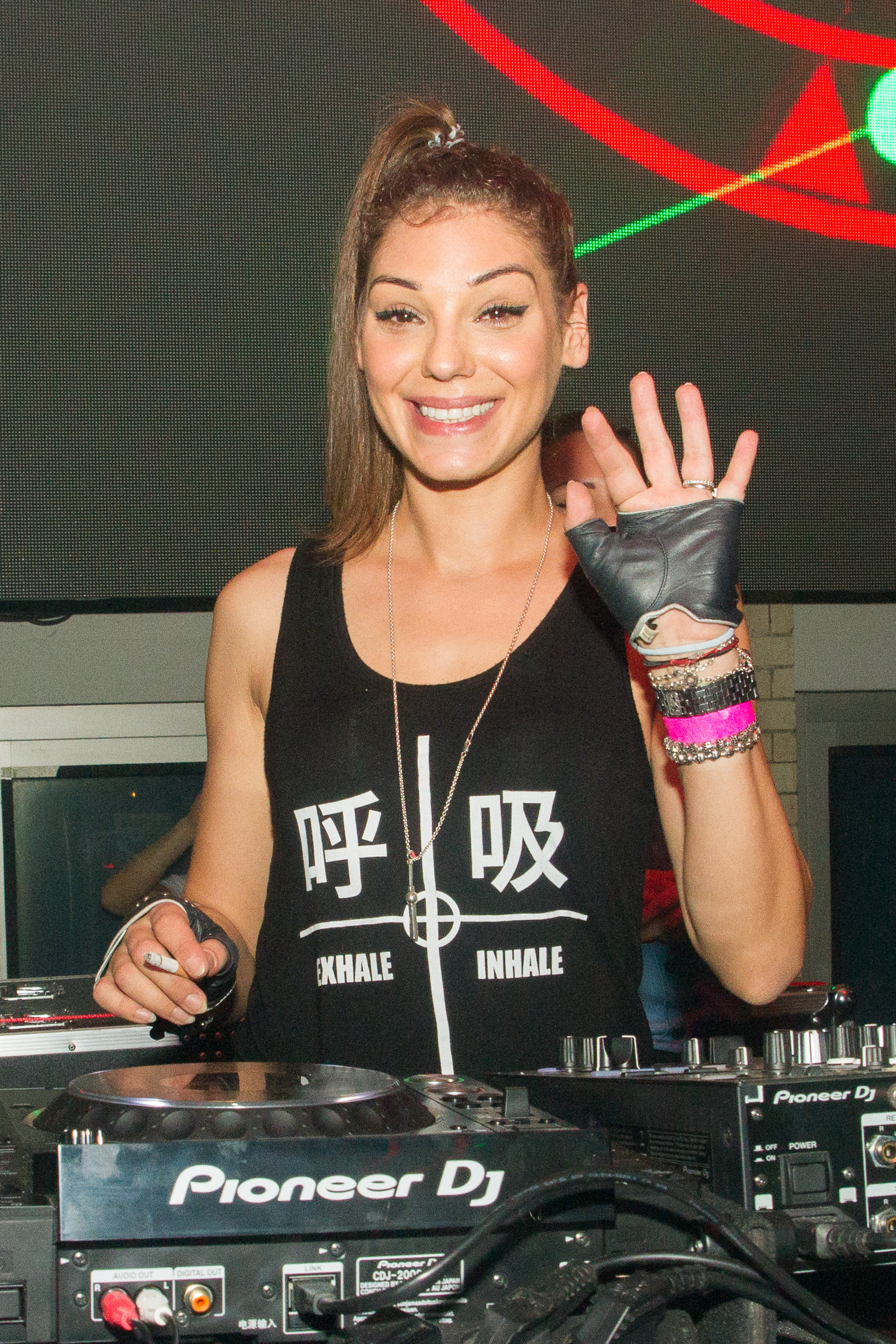
- Simina Grigoriu in 2017

Background information
- Also known as: Simina Grigoriu
- Born: Ana Simina Grigoriu; May 8, 1981 (age 45); Bucharest, Romania
- Genres: Techno; Minimal; Electronica; Downbeat
- Occupations: electronic musician, music producer
- Instruments: Turntables, keyboard, Ableton Live
- Labels: Sonat Records, Phase Insane Records, Intelectro Vive, Urban Sound Records, Frequenza Records, Susumu Records
- Website: www.siminagrigoriu.com

Ana Simina Grigoriu (born 8 May 1981 in Bucharest) is a Romanian-Canadian DJ and music producer from Toronto specializing in electronic techno music. She has lived and worked in Berlin, Germany, since 2008.

== Life and career ==
Grigoriu was born in Romania. During the Ceaușescu era, her parents fled to Toronto, Ontario.

In Toronto she began rapping during her time at the Earl Haig Secondary School before she found her love of electronic music. During her high school time until 2000 she also attended the private School of Liberal Arts (SOLA). Until 2004 she studied print production and marketing as well as entrepreneurship and innovation at the Ryerson University.

After she met Paul Kalkbrenner on his promotion tour for his film Berlin Calling in Toronto she moved to Berlin in summer of 2008 where she has been playing in clubs and festivals as well as building on her production skills. In 2010 she performed as the opening act for Kalkbrenner's 2010 Berlin Calling concert tour. On 24 August 2012 she published her first album. The day after, she married Paul Kalkbrenner.

== Discography ==
=== Albums ===
- 2012: Exit City (Susumu Records)

=== Singles and EPs ===
- 2010: Mukluks & Ponytails (Sonat Records)
- 2011: Nebuna Stricata (Phase Insane Records)
- 2011: Project Boondocks Part 1-3 (Frequenza Records)
- 2011: La Palmas (Intellectro Vibe Records, together with Imerio Vitti and Luca Vera)
- 2011: Writers (Sonat Records, together with Ludovic Wendi)
- 2012: Baby (Susumu Records, together with Imerio Vitti)
- 2012: Kokopelli (Susumu Records)
- 2016: "Nunchaku / Kubota (Kuukou Records)
- 2024: UFO Network - Iron Angel / Kubota (Kuukou Records)
