= Eisel =

Eisel is a German surname that may refer to the following people:

- Bernhard Eisel (born 1981), Austrian road bicycling racer
- Fritz Eisel (1929–2010), German painter and graphic artist
- Mary-Ann Eisel (born 1946), American tennis player

== See also ==
- Easel
