= Weissensee (TV series) =

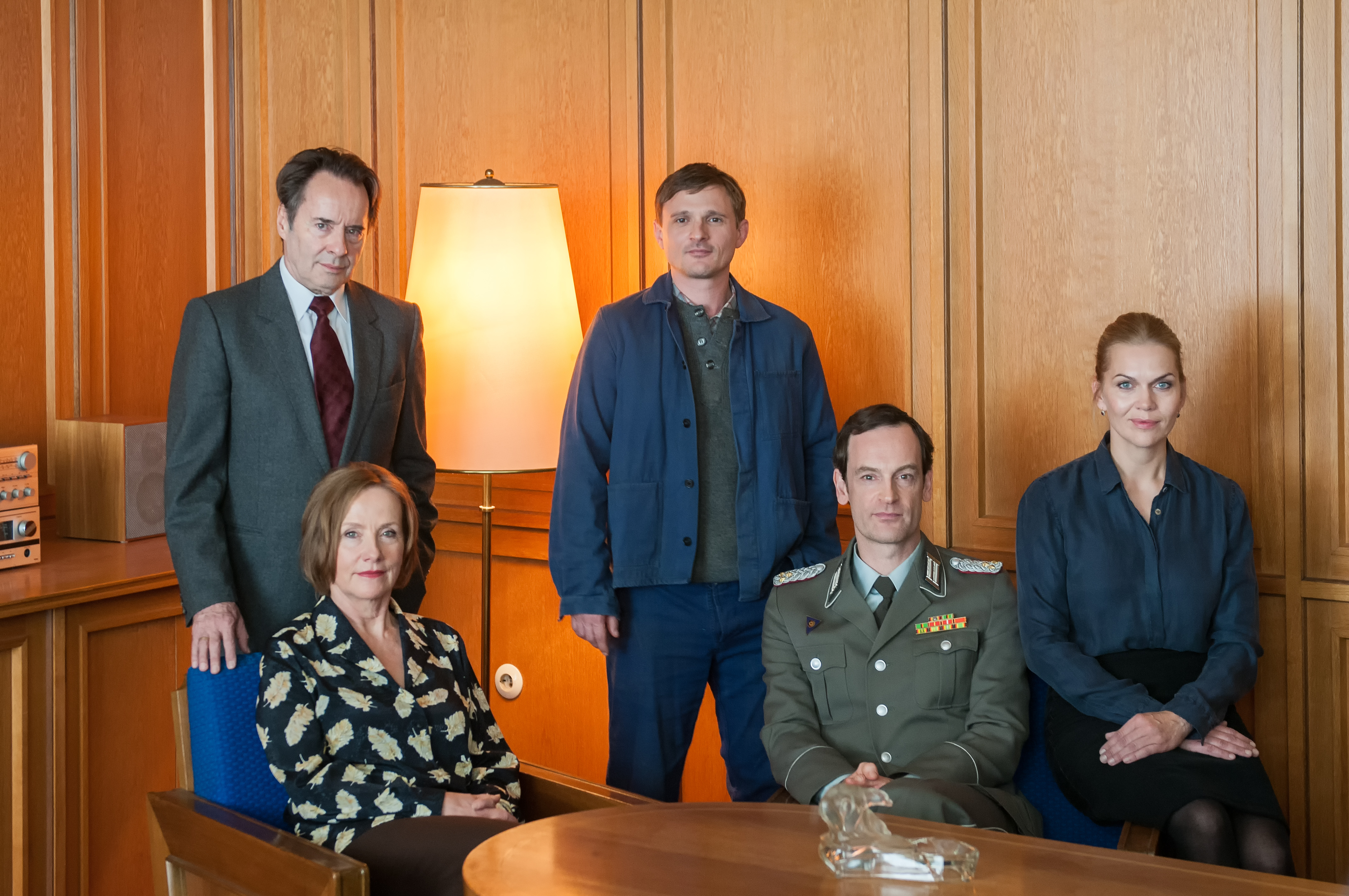
- photo on set
- Created by: Annette Hess
- Directed by: Friedemann Fromm
- Starring: Uwe Kockisch; Jörg Hartmann; Florian Lukas; Anna Loos; Ruth Reinecke; Katrin Sass; Hannah Herzsprung
- Composers: Martin Hornung; Stefan Mertin; Mirko Michalzik
- Country of origin: Germany
- Original language: German
- No. of seasons: 4
- No. of episodes: 24

Production
- Executive producers: Marc Müller-Kaldenberg; Regina Ziegler
- Producer: Marc Müller-Kaldenberg
- Production locations: Berlin, Germany
- Cinematography: Michael Wiesweg
- Editors: Annemarie Bremer; Eva Schnare; Janina Gerkens
- Running time: 50 minutes

Original release
- Network: Das Erste
- Release: 14 September 2010 – 10 May 2018

Weissensee ("White lake") is a German family, drama and romance television series. The series is set in East Berlin between 1980 and 1990 and follows two families.

== Outline ==
The plot follows the Kupfer family, who are well-connected within the communist regime. Hans Kupfer and his son Falk are both senior officers within the East German secret police, whilst his younger son Martin is a regular policeman in the Volkspolizei. Martin opted for this job due to concerns with the morals of the regime. After a brief car chase one evening, Martin arrests Julia Hausmann, a young shop worker. After her release, they quickly strike up a relationship. However, the situation is complicated by the fact that Julia's mother is a singer known for frequently criticising the regime, and the Kupfers' resultant hostility. Falk works to try divide the couple, whilst Hans secretly approaches Julia's mother, with whom it transpires that he once had an affair.

== Cast ==
- Uwe Kockisch as Hans Kupfer
- Jörg Hartmann as Falk Kupfer
- Florian Lukas as Martin Kupfer
- Anna Loos as Vera Kupfer
- Ruth Reinecke as Marlene Kupfer
- Katrin Sass as Dunja Hausmann
- Hannah Herzsprung as Julia Hausmann

== See also ==
- List of German television series
- the Weissensee neighborhood from Berlin
