= Tinlicker =

Dutch electronic music duo

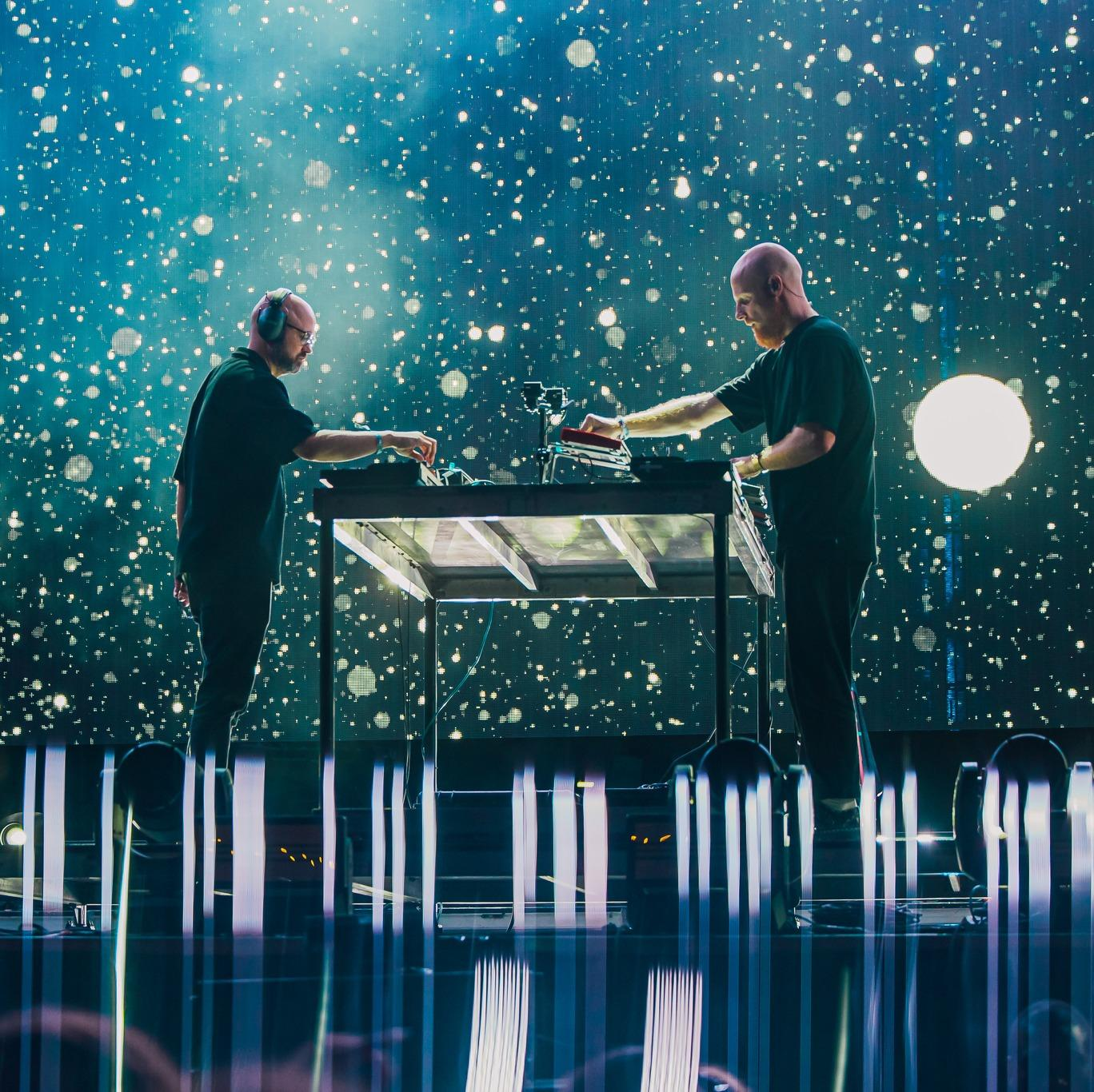
- Tinlicker (2024)

Background information
- Origin: Utrecht, Netherlands
- Genres: progressive house . deep house . indietronica
- Years active: 2012–present
- Labels: Anjunadeep; Mau5trap; Armada; PIAS
- Members: Jordi van Achthoven; Micha Heyboer; Hero Baldwin
- Website: tinlicker.com

Tinlicker is a Dutch electronic music group from Utrecht comprising Micha Heyboer, Jordi van Achthoven & Hero Baldwin. Formed in 2012, they have released music on labels such as [PIAS], Anjunadeep and Armada. They have played festivals including Coachella, Pinkpop Festival, Creamfields, Sziget Festival, Tomorrowland, Ultra, and Electric Daisy Carnival.

== History ==
=== Debut (2012–2017) ===
Tinlicker started as a solo project of Micha Heyboer (born 14 May 1979 in Utrecht, The Netherlands) on his own Zero Three Zero label, beginning with the release of the It's My First Time Here EP (7 December 2012) and the subsequent release of the Remember The Future demo compilation (8 April 2013).

Through a mutual contact, Jordi van Achthoven (born 4 June 1983 in Gouda, The Netherlands) connected with Micha in 2014. Both artists were inspired by Paul Kalkbrenner, Trentemøller, and Moderat. They decided to continue as a duo and started working with Feed Me's Sotto Voce label. They released three EPs with Feed Me: Like No Other (1 December 2014), Into The Open (14 April 2015), and The Space In Between including "Oudegracht" (4 September 2015). The latter garnered significant online attention.

Toolroom sublabel Zerothree released "Maandag" on 5 February 2016. Above & Beyond premiered it on their Group Therapy radio show. Later in 2016, Zerothree released the Automatic EP, including "In All The Fire", which premiered on Data Transmission.]

=== Anjunadeep, "This Is Not Our Universe", and "In Another Lifetime" (2017-2023) ===
Tinlicker began 2017 with "Soon You'll Be Gone", their debut release on Anjunadeep. Later in the year, Tinlicker signed a deal with booking agency David Lewis Productions, who booked them a show on the mainstage of Mysteryland. "Because You Move Me" was released by Armada and with the Jalapeño EP, their collaboration with the label of deadmau5 got a follow-up. "Nothing Without You" and remixes for Lane 8 and Gabriel & Dresden settled Tinlicker as an Anjunadeep act in 2018. They returned on mau5trap with the About You EP and a collaboration with Lane 8 before signing an album deal in London with Anjuna.

Introduced by the singles "Lost", "Breezeblocks", and "Need You", the This Is Not Our Universe full-length album, featuring vocals by alt-J, Run Rivers, Thomas Oliver, and Belle Doron, was released on 27 September 2019 and reached number 1 on the dance album charts in the United States, Australia, India, Canada, and Finland and number 2 in the United Kingdom, the Netherlands, and Poland.

Spring 2020 saw the release of the This Is Not Our Universe remixes, with album tracks reworked by Dosem, Joris Delacroix, and Grum. Tinlicker perform worldwide and host their own bi-monthly Remember The Future club night in their hometown of Utrecht at the venue TivoliVredenburg. Other 2020 highlights were the release of the Paradise EP on Astralwerks and the remix of the Robert Miles classic "Children", which reached the number 1 position on Beatport in November. In early 2021, Tinlicker released a collaboration with Ben Böhmer on Anjunadeep.

The duo's second album, In Another Lifetime, was released on 18 February 2022.

=== "Cold Enough for Snow" and move to PIAS (2023-2025) ===
In November 2023 Tinlicker announced their third artist album, Cold Enough for Snow, set to release for early 2024. They also announced that this will be their first release on the [PIAS] Électronique label, departing Anjunadeep. Cold Enough For Snow was released on 16 February 2024 and includes songs with Brian Molko, Tom Smith (Editors musician) and Circa Waves. American music website Dancing Astronaut exclaims the album their Album Of The Year for 2024. Also Tinlicker's first Essential Mix is released in 2024. In summer they play at crossover events Pinkpop Festival, CRSSD Festival, Crystal Palace Bowl, Coachella and Sziget Festival.

On 11 October 2025, Tinlicker became a trio after announcing that vocalist Hero Baldwin would join the group. They also announced their fourth studio album alongside an EU/UK tour at that time. On 27 February 2026, Dreams of the Machine released.

== Discography ==
=== Albums ===
- This Is Not Our Universe (Anjunabeats, 2019)
- In Another Lifetime (Anjunadeep, 2022)
- Cold Enough for Snow (PIAS Recordings, 2024)
- Dreams of the Machine (PIAS Recordings, 2026)

=== Singles and EPs ===
- Like No Other EP (Sotto Voce, 2014)
- The Space in Between EP (Sotto Voce, 2015)
- Into the Open EP (Sotto Voce, 2015)
- "Maandag (Zerothree, 2016)
- "In All the Fire" (Zerothree, 2016)
- "Soon You'll Be Gone" (Anjunadeep, 2017)
- "Because You Move Me" (Armada, 2017)
- Jalapeño EP (Mau5trap, 2017)
- "Shadowing" / "Motion" (Zerothree, 2017)
- "Nothing Without You" (Anjunadeep, 2018)
- "If I Was" / "Wanderer" (Armada, 2018)
- "Dream with Somebody" (Armada, 2018)
- About You EP (mau5trap, 2019)
- "Anthracite" (Anjunadeep, 2019)
- "Lost" (Anjunabeats, 2019)
- "Breezeblocks" (Anjunabeats, 2019)
- "Need You" (Anjunabeats, 2019)
- "Sleepwalker" (Anjunadeep, 2020)
- "Paradise" (Astralwerks, 2020)
- This Is Not Our Universe – The Remixes (Anjunabeats, 2020)
- "Tell Me" (Be Yourself, 2020)
- "Run Away" (Anjunadeep, 2021)
- "Lost Gravity" (Anjunadeep, 2021)
- "Be Here and Now" (Anjunadeep, 2021)
- Hypnotized / I Can Feel featuring Dosem (Anjunadeep, 2021)
- "You Take My Hand" featuring Jamie Irrepressible (Anjunadeep, 2021)
- "Just to Hear You Say" featuring Nathan Nicholson (Anjunadeep, 2022)
- "Healing Forest" (Anjunadeep, 2022)
- Fade Into Black (Future Classic, 2022)
- Choir To The Wild (Virgin Records, 2022)
- "Starchaser" (Global Underground, 2023)
- "Slipstream" featuring Julia Church (PIAS Recordings, 2023)
- "This Life" featuring Tom Smith (PIAS Recordings, 2023)
- "Nothing To Lose" featuring Circa Waves (PIAS Recordings, 2024)
- Where Did I Go (PIAS Recordings, 2024)
- I Started A Fire (PIAS Recordings, 2025)

=== Remixes ===
- "Higher" (David Douglas, 2015)
- "Never Leave Me" (Petter Carlsen, 2015)
- "Small Room" (Nato Medrado, 2017)
- "Science Of The Heart" (Majestique, 2017)
- "Underwater" (Gabriel & Dresden, 2018)
- "Clarify" (Lane 8, 2018)
- "Need to Feel Loved" (Reflekt, 2019)
- "Breezeblocks" (Alt-J, 2019)
- "Luxuria" (Deadmau5, 2019)
- "The Healing" (James Zabiela, 2020)
- "W.T.F." (Moon Boots, 2020)
- "Wherever You Are" (Nils Hoffmann, 2020)
- "Children" (Robert Miles, 2020)
- "Let Go" (The Irrepressibles, 2021)
- "Hide U" (Kosheen, 2021)
- "Strangers" (Dom Dolla, 2022)
