= Because You Move Me =

2017 single by Tinlicker

Single by Tinlicker & Helsloot
- Released: 31 July 2017
- Length: 3:16
- Label: Armada
- Songwriter(s): Thomas Helsloot; Jordi van Achthoven; Yael Watchman
- Producer(s): Thomas Helsloot

Audio video
- "Because You Move Me" on YouTube

"Because You Move Me" is a song by Dutch electronic music group Tinlicker and Dutch DJ Thomas Helsloot. While originally released in 2017, the music video was released in February 2021, which resulted in renewed interest in the song. The song reached the top 20 in Germany in Switzerland, and the top 30 in Austria. In March 2022, it was certified Gold in Canada.

== Music video ==
Filmed in Alberta, Canada, the video features an ice skater on a frozen lake.

== Charts ==
=== Weekly charts ===
Weekly chart performance for "Because You Move Me"
Chart (2021–2022)	Peak position
Austria (Ö3 Austria Top 40)	22
France (SNEP)	46
Germany (GfK)	14
Switzerland (Schweizer Hitparade)	19

=== Year-end charts ===
2022 year-end chart performance for "Because You Move Me"
Chart (2022)	Position
Germany (Official German Charts)	76
Lithuania (AGATA)	84
Switzerland (Schweizer Hitparade)	54

== Certifications ==
Certifications for "Because You Move Me"
Region	Certification	Certified units/sales
Canada (Music Canada)	Gold	40,000^{‡}
Denmark (IFPI Danmark)	Gold	45,000^{‡}
France (SNEP)	Diamond	333,333^{‡}
Germany (BVMI)	Platinum	400,000^{‡}
Italy (FIMI)	Gold	50,000^{‡}
Netherlands (NVPI)	Gold	20,000^{‡}
New Zealand (RMNZ)	Platinum	30,000^{‡}
Spain (PROMUSICAE)	Gold	30,000^{‡}
United Kingdom (BPI)	Silver	200,000^{‡}
Streaming
Greece (IFPI Greece)	Platinum	2,000,000^{†}
^{‡} Sales+streaming figures based on certification alone.^{†} Streaming-only figures based on certification alone.
