= Berlin Calling =

2008 film

- Directed by: Hannes Stöhr
- Screenplay by: Hannes Stöhr
- Produced by: Karsten Aurich
- Starring: Paul Kalkbrenner; Corinna Harfouch; Rita Lengyel; RP Kahl; Araba Walton
- Edited by: Anne Fabini
- Music by: Paul Kalkbrenner; Fritz Kalkbrenner; Sascha Funke
- Distributed by: Movienet
- Release date: August 2008 (Locarno)
- Running time: 109 minutes
- Country: Germany
- Language: German

Berlin Calling is a 2008 German tragicomedy film directed by Hannes Stöhr. The film depicts the events following DJ and producer Ickarus's (Paul Kalkbrenner) institutionalization for drug abuse.

The film premiered at the 2008 Locarno International Film Festival. Anne Fabini was nominated in 2009 for the German Film Award in the Best Editing category.

== Plot ==
Berlin techno DJ and producer Martin Karow (nicknamed Ickarus) is touring the techno clubs of the world with his girlfriend Mathilde while working on a new studio album that he plans to release soon. In order to be able to work and party day and night, Ickarus takes all kinds of drugs, mainly supplied by his friend Erbse at the clubs in Berlin. After consuming a PMA-containing ecstasy tablet, Ickarus goes into a drug-induced psychosis, eventually finding himself naked in a Berlin hotel where his antics attract the attention of the hotel staff. He is taken to a psychiatric hospital in Berlin, which puts his album and upcoming live performances in danger.

At the hospital, Ickarus gets to know the other patients, namely Crystal Pete and Goa Gebhard, and is slightly unnerved by their idiosyncrasies. The clinic's head doctor Dr. Paul recommends that Ickarus take a break from his music and touring to recover in the hospital under her care. She emphasizes that Ickarus's commitment to the hospital is purely voluntary. Although Ickarus agrees to stay at the hospital, he continues work on his album by having his laptop and recording equipment brought to the clinic. Ickarus leaves the clinic and relapses into drug use after visiting with Erbse. Alice, the head of the record label Vinyl Distortion (to which Ickarus is signed), tells Mathilde that the release of Ickarus's new album is indefinitely delayed. Upon hearing this, Ickarus visits Alice and destroys her office when she refuses to speak to him.

Upset at Ickarus's lack of progress, Mathilde moves out of their apartment and in with her lesbian co-worker Corinna. After receiving a 25,000 Euro tax bill, Ickarus tries to visit Mathilde at Corinna's apartment, but she refuses to see him. Dr. Paul tells Ickarus that since he refuses to follow his therapy schedule and leaves the clinic without permission, he must leave the clinic. That night, after Dr. Paul has left, Ickarus convinces the clinic's intern to allow him to throw a going-away party. The party quickly gets out of hand when Ickarus brings drugs, alcohol, and prostitutes. Dr. Paul arrives at the clinic and locks Ickarus in a room. As a consequence of his actions he is now transferred to the closed unit of the facility where he will be treated behind locked doors and won't be able to leave without the consent of the doctors.

Ickarus's father (a priest who also appeared earlier in the film) and Mathilde argue with Dr. Paul for his release. Dr. Paul eventually relents. After his production label re-signs him, Ickarus proposes calling his new album Titten, Techno, und Trompeten (Tits, Techno, and Trumpets). Alice says that the record company prefers a more "international" title, and decides on the name Berlin Calling. The album cover photography is done in the clinic with Ickarus still dressed as a patient.

== Cast ==
- Paul Kalkbrenner as Martin "Ickarus" Karow
- Rita Lengyel as Mathilde
- Corinna Harfouch as Professor Doctor Petra Paul
- Araba Walton as Corinna
- Peter Schneider as Crystal Pete, a patient at the clinic
- RP Kahl as Ickarus's friend and drug-supplier Erbse
- Henriette Müller as Ickarus's friend Jenny
- Mehdi Nebbou as Jamal
- Udo Kroschwald as Ickarus's father, a priest
- Megan Gay as Alice, Head of Vinyl productions
- Maximilian Mauff as Alex, the clinic intern
- Peter Moltzen as Ickarus's brother, Stefan Karow
- Dirk Borchardt as Club boss Tom
- Erdal Yıldız as Hotel worker
- Ernest Allan Hausmann as Ernesto
- André Hoffmann as Franz
- Caspar Bódy as Goa Gebhard, a patient at the clinic
- Paul Preuss as BMW-Michi
- Sascha Funke as himself
- Housemeister as himself
- Onze as himself
- Fritz Kalkbrenner as himself
- Peggy Laubinger as herself
- Frank Künster as Frank the bouncer
- Nico Bäthgeh as Nico

== Soundtrack ==
The soundtrack of Berlin Calling (which shares the film's title) was recorded exclusively by Paul Kalkbrenner, with the exception of the song "Mango", which was recorded by Sascha Funke. The song "Sky and Sand" features vocals by Kalkbrenner's brother, Fritz. Some tracks on the album (including "Gebrünn Gebrünn" and "Altes Kamuffel") were edits of previously released songs and re-released as "Berlin Calling Edits".
