= Hungry Music =

French electronic music label

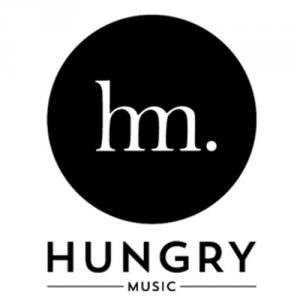
Hungry Music official logo

Hungry Music was a French electronic music label created in 2013 in Aix-en-Provence, France. It consisted of five artists: Worakls, NTO, Joachim Pastor, Stereoclip, and Joris Delacroix. Its musical genre is a mix of techno and acoustic. As of 2025 all five artists are now signed to other labels, Worakls to Polydor, NTO to AllPoints, Joachim Pastor and Stereoclip to Armada Music and Joris Delacroix to Way of House.

== History ==
=== 2013 ===
The label's logo was initially created by Worakls and NTO, but Joachim Pastor quickly joined the project. In 2014, Hungry Music released six EPs, containing tracks from the three artists. Each artist also appeared at several festivals that year, both in France and abroad (Dour, Montreux Jazz Festival, Rennes’ Transmusicales, Pleinvrees, etc.).

=== 2015 ===
In 2015, the label launched its first tour of France, where the trio appeared both individually and together under the name of "Hungry Band". Each artist developed their own live performance, hence projects such as "Worakls Band", "N’to Live Perc", or "Hungry Super Band", including several instrumentalists (cello, viola, violin, guitar, percussion, etc.), while continuing to play in various festivals. In January 2016, Hungry Music played at the nationally famous concert hall Olympia in Paris, France.

In addition to musical releases, Hungry Music also produces videos and shirts.

== Discography ==
- HM01 – Hungry (N'to – "Utopia"; Worakls – "Porto")
- HM02 – Flocon de Neige (Worakls – "Flocon de Neige" & "Elea")
- HM03 – Petite (N'to – "Petite" & "Ayahuasca")
- HM04 – Kenia (Joachim Pastor – "Kenia" & "Couleur")
- HM05 – Salzburg (Worakls – "Salzburg" & "Far Far Away")
- HM06 – Monkey Man (N'to – "Monkey Man" & "Minor Swag")
- HM07 – Mekong (Joachim Pastor – "Mekong" & "Joda")
- HM08 – Toi (Worakls –" & "Cerisier Blanc")
- HM09 – Time (N'to – "Time" & "Chez Nous")
- HM10 – Reykjavik (Joachim Pastor – "Reykjavik" & "Oulan Bator")
- HM11 – Plein Ciel (N'to – "Plein Ciel" & "Comète")
- HM12 – Taïga (Joachim Pastor – "Taïga" & "Amazone")
- HM13 – From Now On (Worakls – "From Now On" & "Question Réponse")
- HM14 – Hungry Music Remix Vol.1 [Joachim Pastor – "Joda (Worakls-Remix)" & "Oulan Bator (Oliver Koletzki Remix)" & "Taga (N'to Remix)"; N'to – "Chez Nous (Joachim Pastor Remix)" & "Petite (Einmusik Remix)"; Worakls - "Toi (Boris Brejcha Remix)"]
- HM15 – Fixi (Joachim Pastor – "Fixi" & "Laos" & "The Same")
- HM16 – Mellotron (Worakls – "Mellotron" & "Pandemonium")
- HM17 – La Clé Des Champs (N'to – Clé Des Champs" & "In the Mood for Noune")
- HM18 – Eternity (Joachim Pastor – "Eternity" & "Millenium")
- HM19 – Airplane Lesson (Stereoclip – "Airplane Lesson")
- HM20 – Nocturne (Worakls –"Nocturne")
- HM21 – Carrousel (N'to – "Carrousel")
- HM22 – Promesse (Joachim Pastor – "Promesse")
- HM23 – Sanctis (Worakls –")
- HM24 – The Hound (N'to – Hound")
- HM25 – Mountain (Joachim Pastor –"Mountain")
- HM26 – North Sea (Stereoclip – Sea")
- HM27 – Croche (N'to – "Croche")
- HM28 – Ariane (Joachim Pastor – "Ariane")
- HM29 – Alter Ego (N’to – Ego")
- HM30 – Corsair (Joachim Pastor –"Corsair")
- HM31 – Charlie (N’to – "Charlie")
- HM32 – Cloches (Worakls – "Cloches")
- HMR3 – Orchestra (Worakls – "Orchestra")
- HM33 – Eiffel Powder (Joachim Pastor – "Eiffel Powder")
- HM34 – The Morning After (N'to – "The Morning After")
- HM35 – Time to Lose (Joris Delacroix – "Time to Lose")
- HM36 – Goodbyes (Joachim Pastor – "Goodbyes")
- HM37 - Stay (Joris Delacroix – Stay & Stay (Short Version))
