= Florian Lukas =

German actor (born 1973)

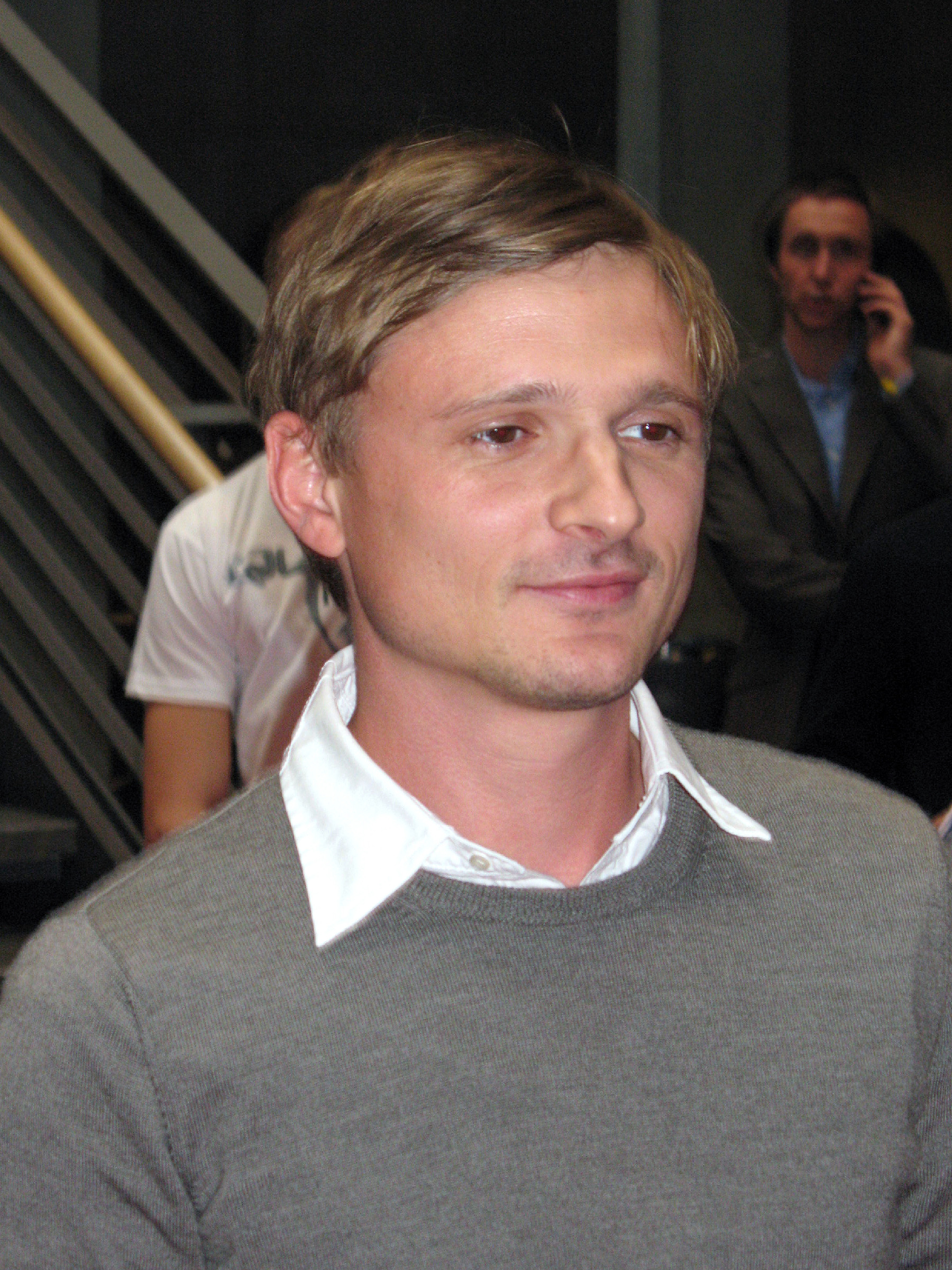
- Lukas in the Premier of Max Minsky and Me
- Born: 16 March 1973 (age 53); East Berlin, East Germany
- Occupation: Actor
- Years active: 1992–present
- Website: florianlukas.de

Florian Lukas (16 March 1973) is a German actor from Berlin. He has appeared in series and films, and regularly in TV episodes of Tatort. He is also an audiobook narrator. He had his breakthrough as an actor in 2003 as Denis in Good Bye, Lenin!.

== Filmography ==
Film
Year	Title	Role	Notes
1992	Banale Tage	Michael	
1993	Der kleine und alte Mann	Andy	
1994	Ex	Klaus	TV movie
1994–2016	Tatort	Roy Weischlitz / Pater Markus / Alexander Grau / Thorsten Tiefenthal	4 episodes
1997	Bandagistenglück	Christian	
1997	Gone Wrong	Manuel	
1997	Dazlak	Dazlak	
1997	Tut mir leid wegen gestern	Harri	
1998	Trial by Fire	Robert	
1998	Dunckel	Benny Dunckel	TV movie
1998	Das vergessene Leben	Axel	TV movie
1998	The Polar Bear	Reza	
1999	St. Pauli Night	Sven	
1999	Absolute Giganten	Ricco	
2000	Zoom	Tom Waller	
2001	Emil and the Detectives	Kellner	
2001	Mädchen, Mädchen	Trainer Carsten	
2001	Wambo	Clemens	TV movie
2002	Freiheit for my Brother	Bruno	TV movie
2003	Good Bye, Lenin!	Denis	
2003	Liberated Zone	Michael 'Micha' Resser	
2003	Learning to Lie	Mücke	
2003	Zuckerbrot	Ricki	
2003–2016	Nachtschicht	Alphons Tøfting / Kevin König	3 episodes
2004	Off Beat	Richie	
2004	Sergeant Pepper	Sergeant Pepper	Voice
2005	One Day in Europe	Rokko (Episode Istanbul)	
2005	No Songs of Love	Tobias Hansen	
2005	The Night of the Great Flood	Horst Sahm	TV movie
2006	FC Venus	Steffen Hagen	
2007	Military Academy	Thorsten Schleifer	
2007	Special Escort	Frank	
2008	North Face	Andi Hinterstoisser	
2008	Waiting for Angelina	Paparazzo Maik Tremper	
2010	When We Leave	Stipe	
2010	Weissensee, Season 1	Martin Kupfer	
2009	Die Wölfe	Bernd Lehmann	Episode: "Zerbrochene Stadt"
2009	Der kleine Mann	Jürgen Wiemers	8 episodes
2009	Acht auf einen Streich – Die Gänsemagd	Prinz Leopold	TV movie
2010	When We Leave	Stipe	
2011	I Phone You	Marco	
2011	Anduni	Manuel	
2011	Remembrance	Hans von Eidem	
2011	Don 2	Det. Jens Berkel	Indian Hindi-language movie
2011	Weissensee, Season 2	Martin Kupfer	
2012	Into the White	Leutnant Horst Schopis	
2014	The Grand Budapest Hotel	Prisoner Pinky	
2016	NSU German History X: The Investigators	Paul Winter	
2017	The Invisibles	Werner Scharff	
2018	The Silent Revolution	Direktor Schwarz	
2020	Der Überläufer	Paul Zacharias	
