= Marta Pazos =

Spanish theatre director (born 1976)

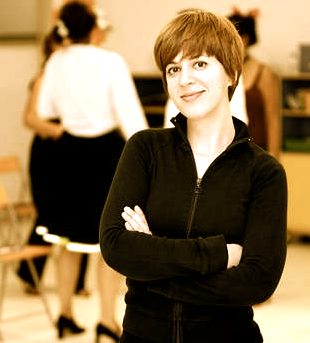
- Born: 1976 (age 48–49); Vigo, Spain
- Education: University of Barcelona
- Occupation(s): Theater director, set designer, playwright, actress
- Partner: Hugo Torres
- Children: 2
- Website: www.martapazos.es

Marta Pazos (born 1976) is a Spanish theater director, set designer, playwright, and actress. She is a cofounder of the Voadora theater company, which she worked with until it disbanded in May 2022.

== Early life and education ==
Marta Pazos was born in Vigo in 1976, the daughter of a nurse and a jazz musician. She earned a licentiate in fine arts from the University of Barcelona, with a specialization in painting.

In 1999, she created her first show and founded her first company, called Belmondo. In 2007, she founded the theater company Voadora, together with the actor Hugo Torres and producer José Díaz.

Torres is also her romantic partner, and they have two children together.

== Career ==
As the theater director of Voadora, Pazos oversaw numerous shows, including Tokio3, a finalist at the 2013 Premios Max in the Best New Show category, and winner of five María Casares Theater Awards. She later mentioned this as one of her most complex jobs as a director.

A work of resistance. Generally you have to be cautious with the topic you choose because it somehow ends up saturating the whole journey. Tokio3 was a show based on the Paradiso from Dante Alighieri's Divine Comedy, but the process had a lot of Inferno. Production came close to collapsing several times. Two days before the premiere, I had a corneal injury that prevented me from being in contact with light. It was a great learning experience and one of the most important "twists" in Voadora's career.

Her 2017 play Sueño de una noche de verano, cowritten with Mario Layera, is a reimagining of Shakespeare's A Midsummer Night's Dream, with the character Lysander being forbidden to marry because he is transgender. Garage opened the 2017–2018 season of the MA Scéne Nationale of Montbéliard in France. Her 2019 musical Hemos venido a darlo todo took inspiration from the Voyager Golden Records which were launched into space in 1977.

Pazos has also directed productions such as Martes de Carnaval (2017), the first work in Galician by Ramón del Valle-Inclán, for the Galician Dramatic Center. She directed and designed scenery for the opera A amnesia de Clío (2019), composed by Fernando Buide with a libretto by Fernando Epelde. Also in 2019, she directed the opera buffa Je suis narcissiste, composed by Raquel García-Tomás with a libretto by Helena Tornero, a coproduction of the Òpera de Butxaca, Teatro Real, Teatro Español, and Teatre Lliure. This was nominated for Best World Premiere at the International Opera Awards.

In 2020, Pazos directed Siglo mío, bestia mía by Lola Blasco. In February 2021, she directed the first theatrical adaptation of Federico García Lorca's only film script, Viaje a la Luna, for the Teatre Lliure in Barcelona. In May of that year, she premiered her third Shakespeare adaptation, Othello, at the Teatro de La Abadía in Madrid, and in November, she premiered Lorca's Play Without a Title for the Centro Dramático Nacional.

In 2022, she premiered the play As oito da tarde cando morren as nais by Avelina Pérez at the Galician Dramatic Center. Then, together with Christina Rosenvinge and María Folguera, she directed Safo, which premiered at the Mérida International Classical Theater Festival. She also created Twist for the Circo Price Theater in Madrid. The same year, she began a residency as coordinator of the creation laboratory of the master's degree program in Artistic Teaching, Thought, and Contemporary Scenic Creation at the Superior School of Dramatic Art of Castile and León.

Her company Voadora disbanded in May 2022. In a July 2023 interview, Pazos explained,

We have been working together for 15 years; we are a family, and now the time has come to let go of our hands, to be able to do, each one of us, our projects separately. And that does not have to come from conflicts, or from fatigue, but simply from being aware that we have to fly – a reason the company is called Voadora. And we have done that, closing this cycle of our life together, as only we know how to do it, with a show, with our art.

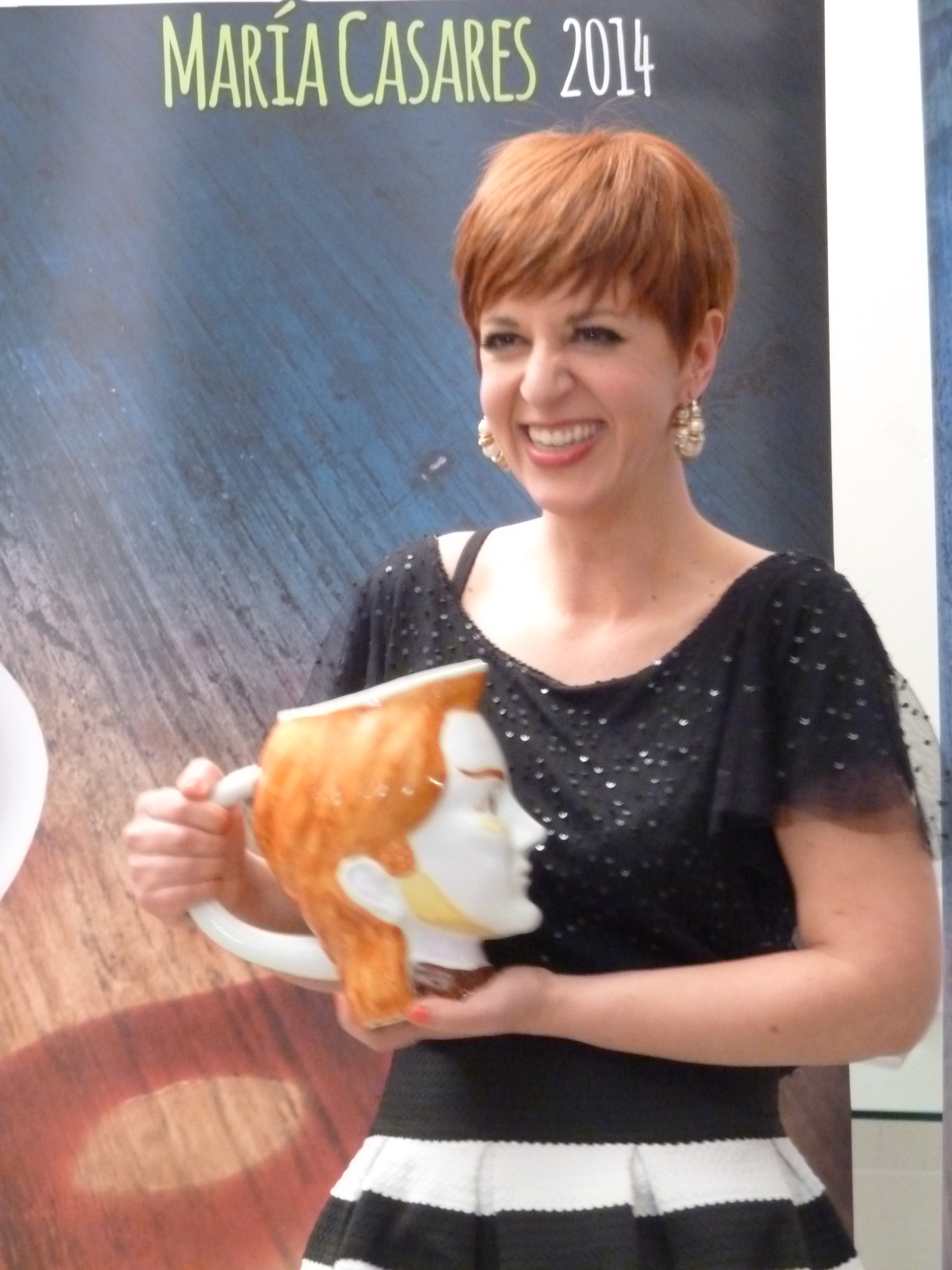
At the 2014 María Casares Awards

In 2023, Pazos directed the opera Alexina B., composed by Raquel García-Tomás with a text by Irène Gayraud, inspired by the memoirs of Herculine Barbin, Mes Souvenirs.

Her works are characterized by an aesthetic in which the use of color is predominant.

== Awards and recognition ==
- 2013 - Galician Critics' Award for Scenic and Audiovisual Arts for Voadora
- 2014 – María Casares Awards for Best Director and Best Set Design for Tokio3
- 2018 – Dorotea Bárcena Award for career achievement at the 29th Galician Theater Festival
- 2019 – Pontevedresa of the Year
- 2020 – María Casares Award for Best Set Design for Neorretranca e posmorriña
- 2020 – Roberto Vidal Bolaño Award at the Ribadavia International Theater Show
