= Monolink =

German musician, singer-songwriter and electronic dance music producer

Monolink (Steffen Linck)
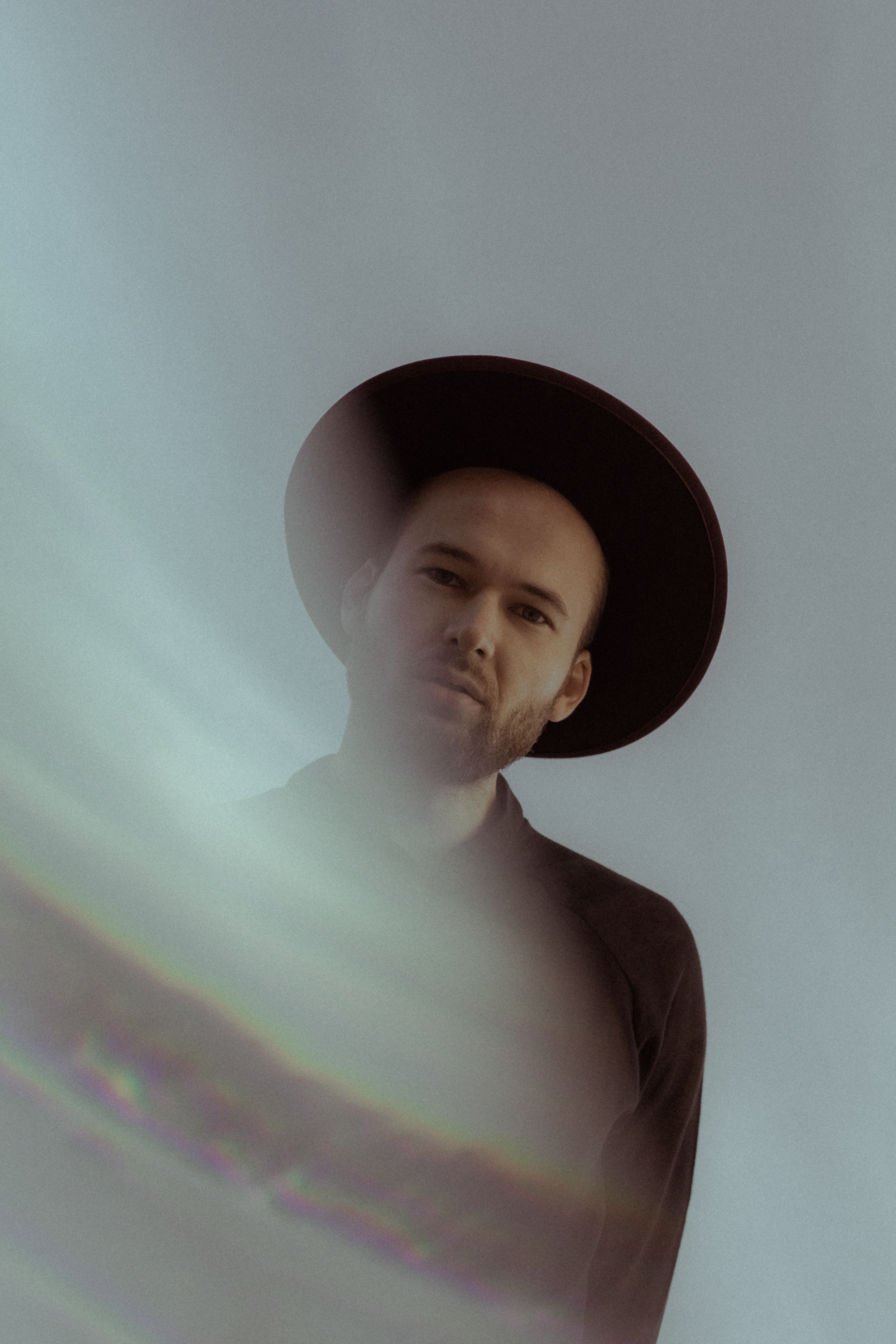

Background information
- Born: West Germany
- Genres: Ambient; Minimal techno; electronica
- Occupations: DJ; music producer; singer-songwriter
- Instruments: Guitar, Piano
- Years active: 2014–present
- Labels: Embassy One Records, Afterlife
- Website: Official website

Monolink is the stage name of Steffen Linck, a German singer-songwriter and electronic dance music producer who specializes in ambient, techno, electronica and house genres.

== Music career ==
A member of the Berlin electronica scene, Monolink quickly broke away from the classic DJ set and instead created his own style with a combination of live vocals and instruments. SF Weekly describes him as a purveyor of "trippy relaxation with a slightly gravelly, Teutonic voice". Monolink collaborated with other electronic acts, including Acid Pauli.

Monolink released his debut album, Amniotic, in 2018. The recording combines the tradition of singer-songwriting with electronic dance music, where techno, electronica and ambient genres blend with influences of Leonard Cohen and Bob Dylan. Two singles from the release, "Sirens" and "Swallow" appeared at No. 1 spot in the iTunes Electronic (Germany). A review in EDM Identity describes the songs from the album as consisting of "hypnotic beats and vocals" and as "a blend of both deep and happy melodic sounds".

Monolink performed at the 22nd Coachella Valley Music and Arts Festival in April 2023.

== Discography ==
=== Albums ===
- Amniotic (2018)
- Atemlos (2021)
- The Beauty Of It All (2025)

=== Singles ===
- The End (with Acid Pauli) (2015)
- Sirens (2017)
- Swallow (2018)
- Father Ocean (2018)
- Rearrange My Mind (2019)
- Black Hole (with Ben Böhmer) (2019)
- Sinner (2020)
- Otherside (2020)
- The Prey (2021)
- Harlem River/Falling (2021)
- Turning Away (2021)
- Don't Hold Back (2021)
- Beyond Control (with NTO) (2021)
- Fidale (I Feel) (with Zigan Aldi) (2022)
- Running/White Walls (2023)
- Point Of No Return (With Adam Port) (2023)
- The Silence (With Stephan Jolk) (2023)
- Light Up My Dark (2024)

== Awards and nominations ==
=== Berlin Music Video Awards ===
The Berlin Music video awards is an international festival that promotes the art of music videos.

Year	Nominated work	Award	result	Ref.
2025	"Mesmerized"	Best Director	Nominated	
