= Cercle (company) =

Online music broadcasting media

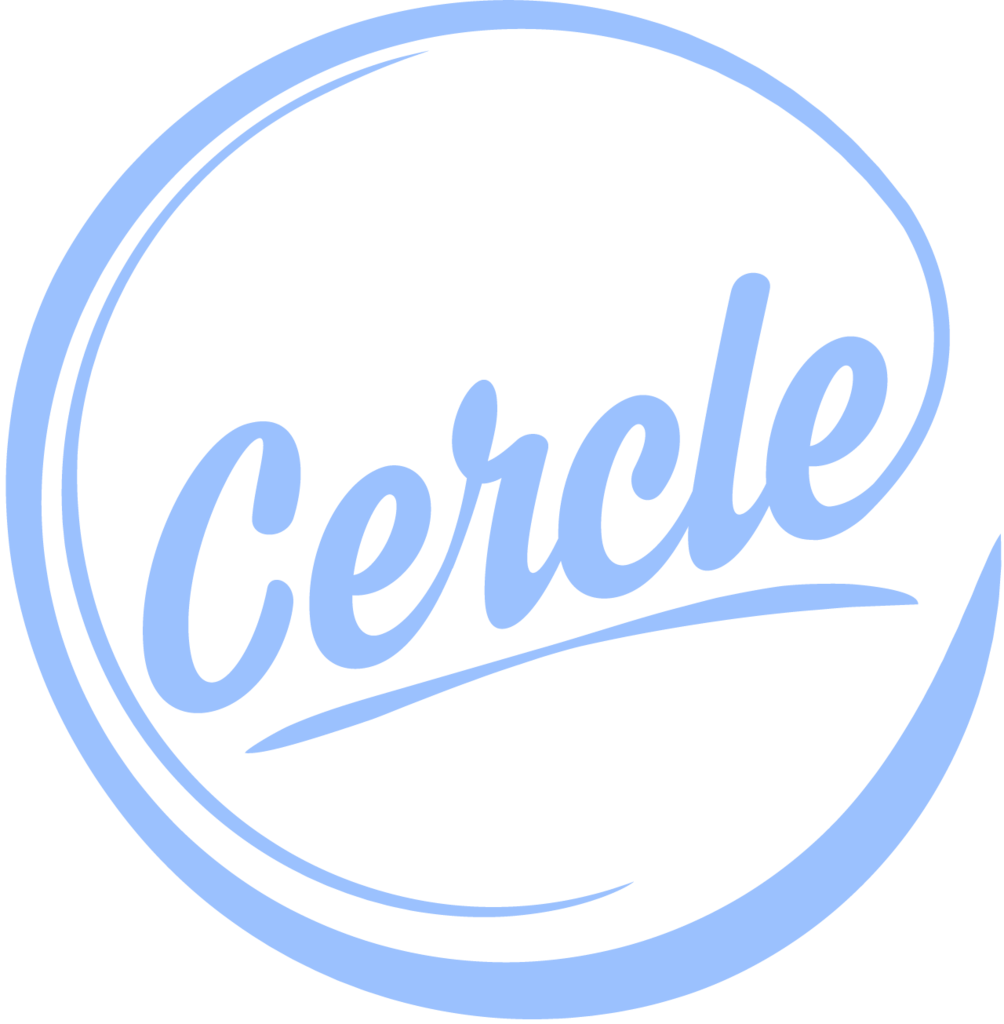
- Logo
- Industry: Music and entertainment
- Founded: 2016; 10 years ago
- Founder: Derek Barbolla
- Headquarters: Paris, France
- Area served: Worldwide
- Services: Online music broadcasting Event & festival production Record label
- Website: www.cercle.io

Cercle is a music company headquartered in Paris, France. It operates as a livestreaming platform for music, an event and festival producer and a record label.

Founded in 2016 by Derek Barbolla, Cercle originally specialized in organizing, filming and broadcasting electronic music concerts in unconventional venues of cultural, natural, aesthetic or artistic significance. While the music programming originally focused on various subgenres of electronic music (deep house, house, techno, dance music, electronica), it broadened its spectrum as of 2021 by featuring neoclassical and jazz artists such as Sofiane Pamart (2021) and Hania Rani (2022) or Ólafur Arnalds (2023).

== History ==
Derek Barbolla founded Cercle in 2016. His first livestreamed videos—which streamed every Monday—featured an interview with a DJ followed by a live set. After receiving complaints from his neighbours, the live shows were exported to various underground locations in Paris: the "basement of a sandwich shop", a "club" or on a "moving barge on the Seine". Barbolla met Philippe Tuchmann at this time at the Faust club in Paris. Tuchmann later became the artistic director of the Cercle.

Pol Souchier, film director and head of communication, said in an interview with Billboard that the idea of producing concerts in cultural heritage locations “wasn't there at the beginning.". It germinated from their first live show at the Eiffel tower in October 2016 with French DJ Møme on the occasion of his Panorama album release. Barbolla had sent a request for a live music performance via the Eiffel Tower's website's contact page and received a positive response. Since then, Cercle has invited an artist on Mondays for a live performance or one-hour DJ set in cultural heritage sites across the world. The guest was then interviewed by Cercle, with questions from online viewers.

== Cercle Shows ==
Cercle has produced and broadcast more than 240 programmes branded as "Cercle Shows" in 31 different countries, among the most notable:

- Ben Böhmer on a hot air balloon over Cappadocia, Turkey (2020)
- Boris Brejcha at the Palace of Fontainebleau (2018), the Grand Palais in Paris (2019) and the Arena of Nîmes (2022)
- Black Coffee at Salle Wagram, Paris, France (2018)
- FKJ at the Salar de Uyuni, Bolivia (2019)
- Sofiane Pamart under auroras, Lapland, Finland (2021)
- Fatboy Slim at Brighton i360, United-Kingdom (2019)
- Nina Kraviz from the first floor of the Eiffel Tower, Paris (2018)
- Carl Cox at the Château de Chambord (2018)
- Amelie Lens at the Atomium in Brussels, Belgium (2019)
- Disclosure at the Plitvice Lakes National Park, Croatia (2020)
- Stephan Bodzin at the Piz Gloria, Switzerland (2018)
- Sébastien Léger at the Giza Pyramids, Egypt (2020)
- Adriatique at the Alpe d'Huez, in the Alps, France (2019)
- Solomun at the Roman Theatre of Orange, France (2018)
- WhoMadeWho at Abu Simbel, Egypt (2021)
- ZHU at Hakuba Iwatake, Nagano, Japan (2020)
- The Blaze at the Aiguille du Midi, Chamonix, France (2020)
- Above & Beyond in Guatapé, Colombia (2021)
- Bedouin at Al-Khazneh, Petra, Jordan (2022)
- Innellea at Jaisalmer Fort Rajasthan India
- Colyn at Jatayu Earth's Center Nature Park in Kollam, Kerala, India

== Cercle Records ==
Cercle Records is a record label founded in September 2020 and owned by the parent company Cercle. Since its inception, Cercle Records has released around 40 singles and EPs from artists invited on the Cercle channel, such as Nopalitos by Kid Francescoli (2021), Cappadocia by Ben Böhmer and Romain Garcia (2021), Canopée des Cîmes by Jan Blomqvist (2022), Abu Simbel by WhoMadeWho (2021) or BOREALIS by Sofiane Pamart (2021).

== Cercle Festival ==
Cercle has produced three festivals (branded as "Cercle Festival") in 2019, 2022 and 2024.

=== Cercle Festival 2019 ===
The 2019 Cercle Festival took place on 11 May 2019 at the Château de Chambord on the occasion of the 500th anniversary of the castle.

=== Cercle Festival 2022 ===
Originally scheduled for 10–11 October 2020, this edition of the Cercle Festival was postponed twice due to the COVID-19 pandemic, and finally took place on 14–15 May 2022 at the National Air & Space Museum near Le Bourget, France, with a total capacity of 24,000 people over the course of the event. The festival featured a line-up of 28 international artists. This edition of the festival was named "Best Electro Music Festival in France 2022" at the Heavent Awards.

=== Cercle Festival 2024 ===
Cercle Festival 2024 took place on 25–26 May 2024 at the National Air & Space Museum near Le Bourget, France, with a total "sold-out" capacity of 24,000 people. According to Notion Magazine, over "140,000 people" had pre-registered for access to the event's tickets. The line-up featured international electronic music acts such as Dixon, The Blaze, The Blessed Madonna, Sven Väth and a livestreamed back-to-back ("b2b") DJ performance by Disclosure and Mochakk.

== Cercle Odyssey ==
On 3 June 2024, Cercle announced the launch of "Cercle Odyssey," a series of live music experiences. The company described the concept as "large-scale," nomadic concert installations with immersive 360-degree visual projections synchronized to live music. The visuals will be projected on “massive screens”, “measuring roughly 40-feet high and 180-feet long” designed to “envelope the audience”.

According to an article published on Billboard, the concept's name “Cercle Odyssey” refers to Homer’s Odyssey and addresses the theme of returning home. The film displayed on the screens will be overseen by Paris-based director Neels Castillon of Ridley Scott Creative Group, co-founder of visual production agency Motion Palace.

Cercle's announcement highlighted the environmental ambitions of the Odyssey stage design in reaction to contemporary standards in the live music industry. According to Billboard, “sound, light and projection equipment used in each performance [will be] rented locally in each respective performance city. The company notes that by using 29 state-of-the-art projectors instead of traditional LED screens to illuminate the scenography, the show doesn’t necessitate the transport of a huge number of LED screens, thereby reducing the carbon emissions of transporting the show.”

On 6 June 2024, Cercle announced that the first tour dates of Cercle Odyssey will take place in 2025 in Los Angeles, Paris and Mexico City.

== Other formats ==
=== Cercle Stories ===
In January 2021, Cercle introduced Cercle Stories, a new audiovisual format that aims to showcase an artist's performance of a track in a location of cultural, historical, natural or aesthetic interest. Cercle Story: Chapter One released in November 2021. Cercle Story: Chapter Two was avant-premiered at Le Grand Rex in Paris, followed by a release party with the featured artists at the Rex Club

=== Cercle Moment ===
Since 2022, Cercle has also developed a new travel experience format, Cercle Moment. For example, Cercle announced in December 2022 a "five-day journey along the Nile" experience in February 2023, which will culminate at Adriatique's live concert at the Temple of Hatshepsut near Luxor, Egypt.

=== One Way ===
In April 2023, Cercle introduced One Way, a series of 20 underground concert experiences that aim to "bring back the essence of dance music" in an age of image and digital hyperconsumerism. In order to focus the experience solely on music, One Way rejects all superficial distractions such as phones, cameras, online music broadcasting and most importantly the identity of the artist. Artists perform within a cubic, modern and enclosed installation art and can see the audience, whereas they cannot see them. Their identity is kept secret until it is revealed at the end of their set. The first one is scheduled for 11 May 2023 in Paris, France.
