= Fritz Eisel =

German painter (1929–2010)

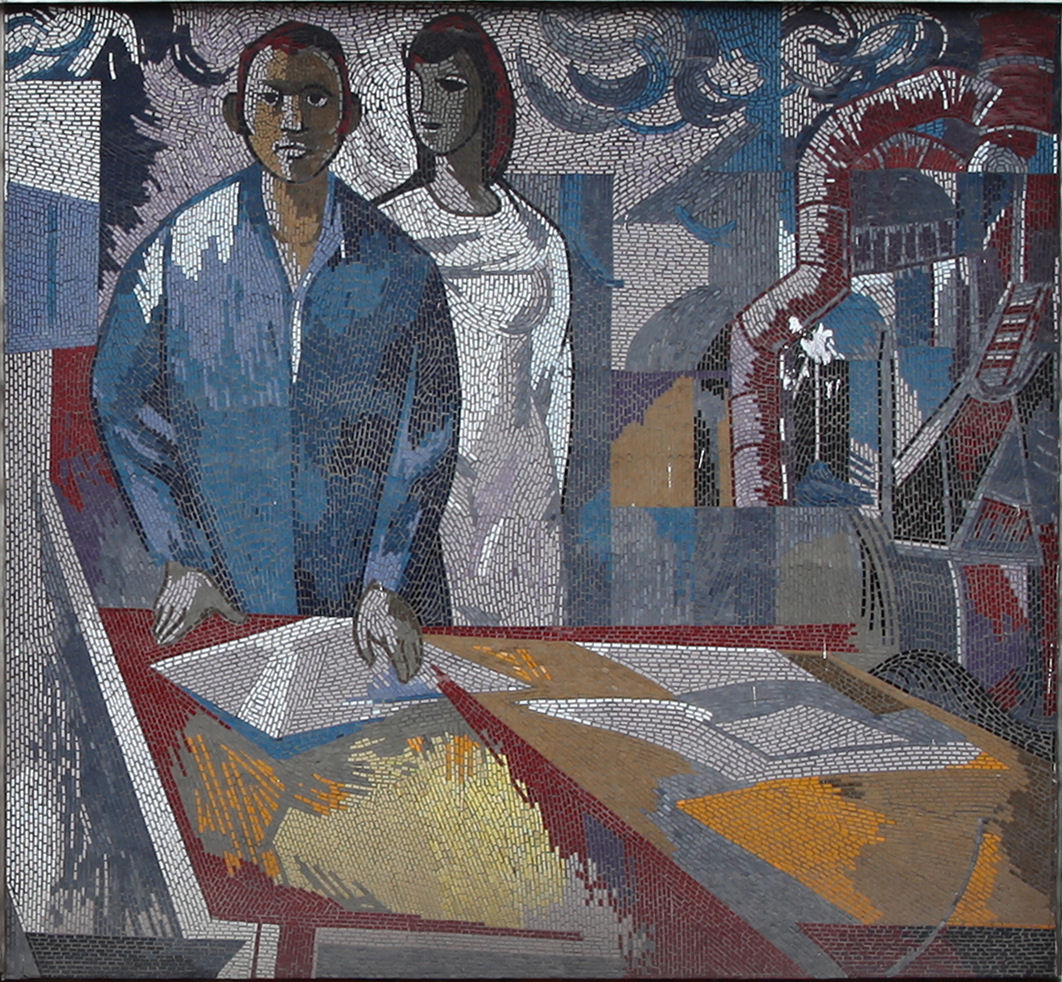
- Section from Humanity Conquers the Cosmos (Mensch bezwingt Kosmos ) by Fritz Eisel (Mosaic in former data processing centre in Potsdam)
- Born: Friedrich Eisel; 27 March 1929; Lauterbach, Hesse, Germany
- Died: 19 September 2010 (aged 81); Langen Brütz, Mecklenburg-Vorpommern, Germany
- Occupations: Painter, graphic artist
- Political party: SED
- Spouse: Christa Lörsch (1951)
- Children: 2

Fritz Eisel (27 March 1929 – 19 September 2010) was a German painter and graphic artist.

== Life ==
Eisel was born into a Communist (albeit relatively apolitical) working-class family in Lauterbach, a small town roughly 100 km (63 miles) north-east of Frankfurt am Main. He was the eldest of his parents' five children. At the start of 1945 he was ordered to go to nearby Battenberg to join one of the flak units set up to try to reduce the impact of enemy bombing raids on the important railway line there. He did not obey the order, and very shortly afterwards the US army occupied Lauterbach. In May 1945 the end of the war marked a return to multi-party government and Eisel, by then 16 years old, immediately took the opportunity to join the local Communist Party. In 1946–47 he was working as a truck driver. In 1947, as millions of Germans were moving west, the Eisel family moved east, relocating to what was, between 1945 and 1949, the Soviet occupation zone in what remained of Germany. Fritz Eisel applied to study at the University of Architecture and Fine Arts (as it was then known) in Weimar and was accepted.

During his first two years as a student, Eisel's approach to the various abstract exercises and projects he was set by his teacher Hans Hoffmann-Lederer was entirely orthodox. As he himself said, that helped him in some ways, but it also undermined his abstract presentational abilities. That changed, however, in 1949 when responsibility for his further artistic education was taken on by Fritz Dähn who had transferred to Weimar the previous year from Stuttgart, and Eisel made further progress when Dähn and Eisel transferred to the Dresden Academy of Fine Arts where Eisel continued his studies from 1950 till 1951. The Soviet occupation zone had become German Democratic Republic in October 1949, and in 1951 Fritz Eisel joined the German League of Visual artists (VBKD / Verband Bildender Künstler Deutschlands). However, he still felt undertrained, and that same year he accepted an offer to attend the Academy of Arts in Leningrad, where one of his teachers was Boris Ioganson, and where he continued his artistic development till 1957.

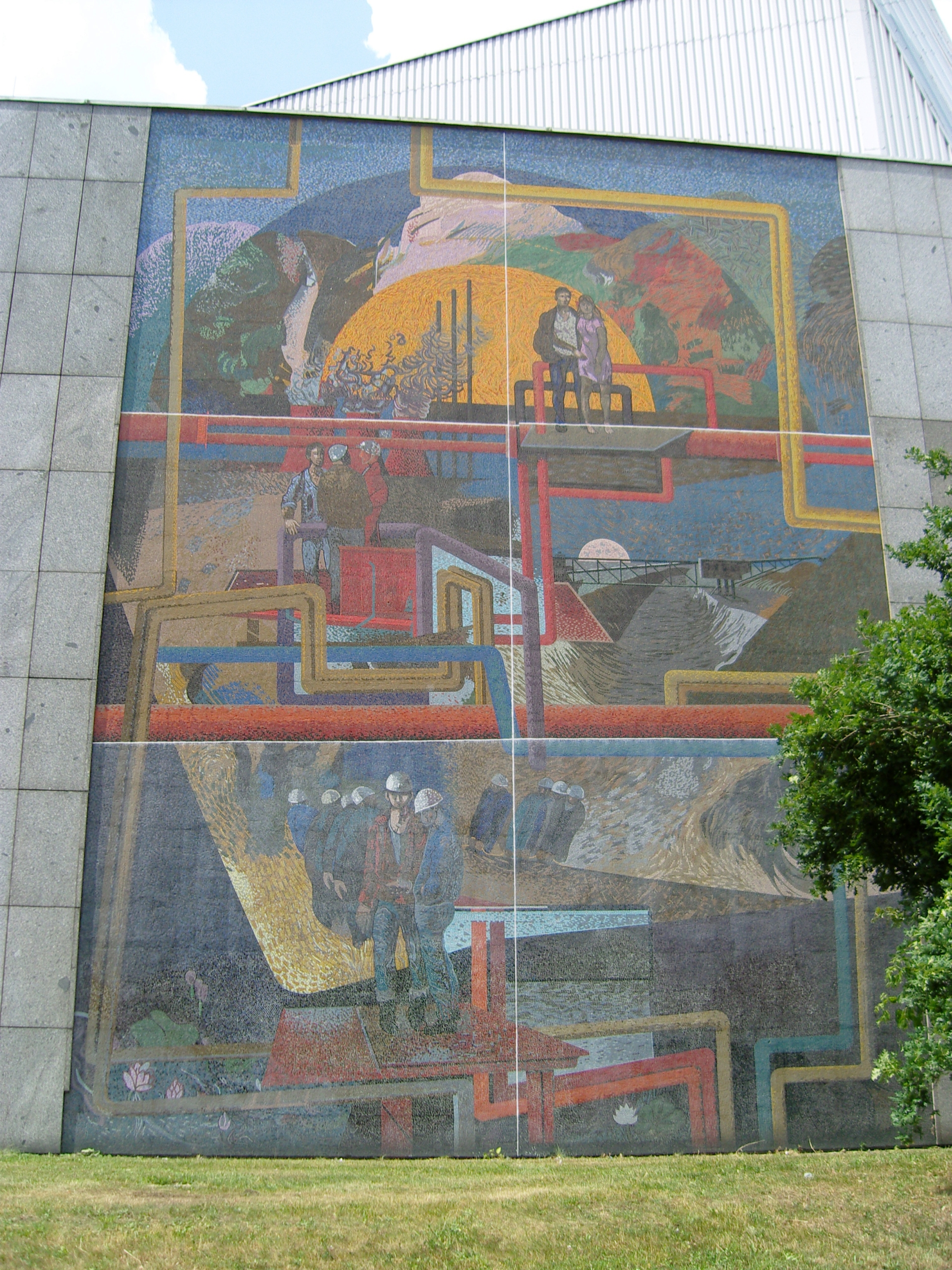
Mosaic wall at the "House of Mining and Energy Workers" in Hoyerswerda

Returning to East Germany, from 1957 Eisel based himself initially in Dresden and later in Potsdam, working as a freelance artist. One of his better known works from this time is his multi-part mosaic in the Potsdam Data Processing Centre. During his Potsdam period Eisel also joined a geological expedition to Mongolia, contributing his skills as a simultaneous translator and as a truck driver. Later trips also took in India and Vietnam. The impact of unfamiliar visual impressions acquired on his overseas visits enabled him greatly to sharpen his eye for portraits and landscapes.

In 1970 Eisel took a teaching post at the Dresden Fine Arts Academy, where he obtained a professorship in 1973. In 1975 he was appointed Rector in succession to Gerhard Kettner. That same year, as Academy Rector, he also became a member of the SED (ruling party) leadership group in Dresden. In 1979 he came up for re-election as Rector of the Academy, but he resisted all imprecations to stand for a further term, because of his rejection of plans decided by the party sponsored VBKD (League of Visual artists) and of the Higher Education Ministry requiring changes to the Academy's educational principals.

In 1980 Fritz Eisel moved north, relocating to Langen Brütz near Schwerin. The next few years were his most productive as an artist, with more landscapes, portraits and still life paintings. In 1983/84 he created the mosaic wall at the "House of Mining and Energy Workers" (subsequently renamed as the "Lausitz Hall") in Hoyerswerda. Between 1985 and 1994 he was also employed as a lecturer at the School of Applied Arts in Heiligendamm.

== Family connections ==
Fritz Eisel and his wife Christa had two children and four grandchildren. Among them are their daughter, writer and journalist Carla Kalkbrenner, and grandsons techno musicians Paul Kalkbrenner and Fritz Kalkbrenner.

== Awards and honours ==
- 1958 Arts prize of the Society for German–Soviet Friendship
- 1961 Theodor Fontane Arts & Literature Prize from Potsdam District
- 1975 Art Prize of the German Democratic Republic
- 1977 Martin Andersen Nexø Prize from the city of Dresden
