= Araba Walton =

Afro-German actress and singer

Araba Walton (born 4 November 1975 in Simbach am Inn, Germany) is an Afro-German actress and singer.

She completed a three-year course at the School of Acting, The Arts Educational Schools in London after studying theater studies in Munich, Germany.

Walton played in several West End and off West End productions before moving end of 2001 to Hamburg to perform in a leading role in the musical Der König der Löwen (The Lion King). After two years she moved to Berlin where she is a permanent member of the Berliner Logentheater and the theatre group abok. She was a cast in Asudem the horror film by Daryush Shokof in 2006 in Berlin.

She was background and lead singer in several bands (1990–1995 Occams Razor, 2003 Eruption and RITE Spirit). In April 2008, her first album Roland Appel was released by Sonar Kollektiv.

Araba Walton is a founding member of the SFD - Schwarze Filmschaffende in Deutschland (Black Artists in German Film) association.

== TV work (selection) ==
- Um Himmels Willen (2010, ARD)
- Wilsberg: Der Mann am Fenster (2009, ZDF)
- Cry No More (2008, ZDF)
- Plötzlich Papa – Einspruch abgelehnt! (2008, Sat.1)
- Western Wald (2008, ARD)

== Movie work (selection) ==
- Und Äktschn! (2013)
- Berlin Calling (2008)
- Sunny Hill (2007)
- Bittersüßes Nichts (2006)
- Brown Girl in the Ring (2005)
- Asudem (2005)
- A2Z (filmed 2004)
- Über das Verschwinden (2004)
- Simon (2004)

== Theater work (selection) ==
- Garuma (2006 Arena, Berlin)
- Blutknoten (2005 Elsässisches Logentheater, Berlin)
- Decameron (2001 Cochraine Theater, London)
- Life as Lilly (2001 Museum of London)
- Geschlossene Gesellschaft as Ines (2000 London Tabard)
- Three sisters as Masha (2000 London Tabard)
- Pentecost as Antonia (2000 The Space, London)
- Edmond (2000 The Space, London)

== Musical work ==
- König der Löwen as Queen Sarabi (2001–2002 and 2004 Hafentheater Hamburg)
- Hair (2001 Brighton Pavilion)

== Album ==
- Roland Appel (album, Sonar Kollektiv)
