= Worakls =

French electronic musician and composer (born 1988)

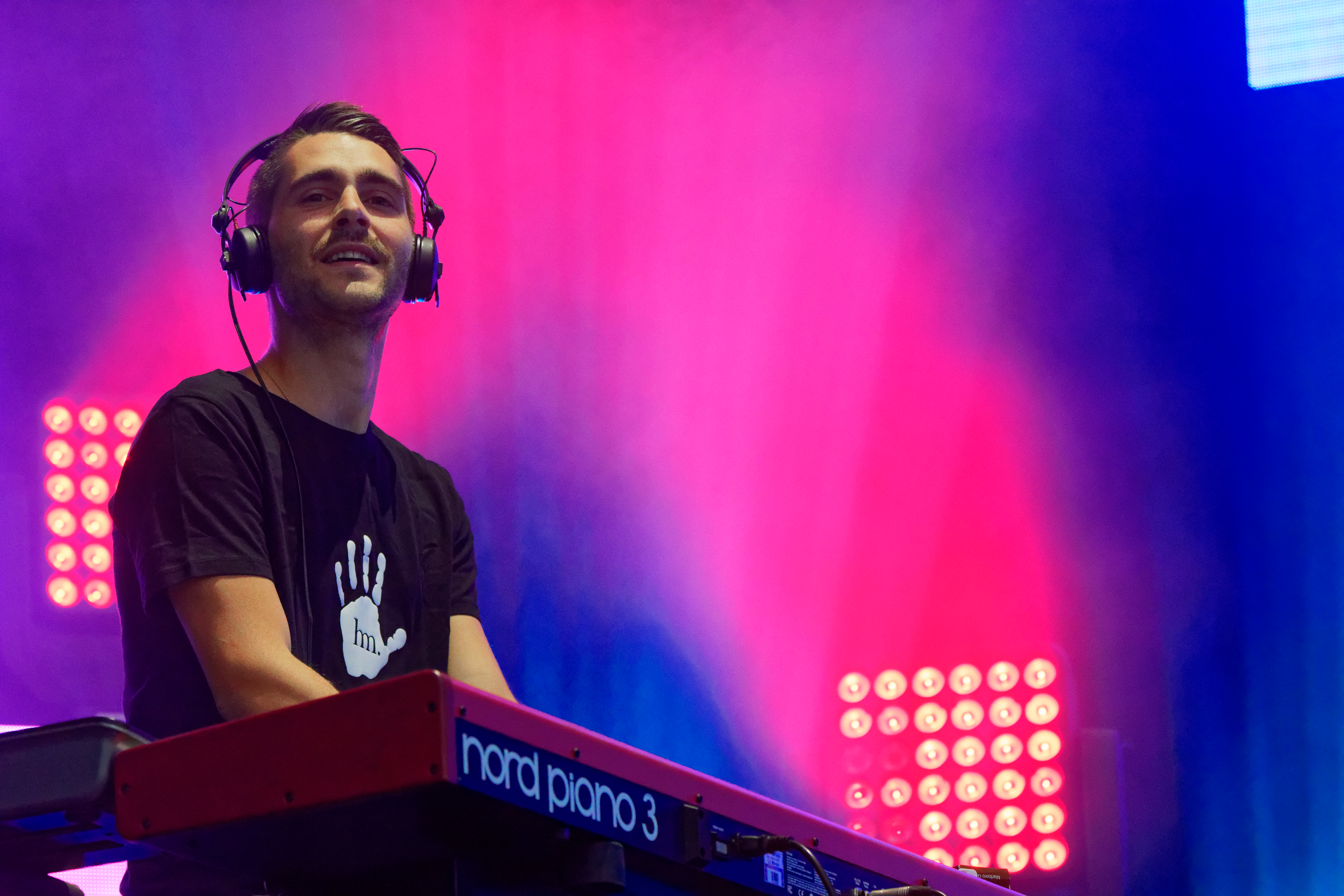
- Worakls performing in 2018

Background information
- Born: Kevin Rodrigues; 28 September 1988 (age 37); Paris, France
- Occupations: composer; musician; record producer
- Labels: Hungry Music; Sonate; Decca Records; Polydor
- Website: worakls.fr

Kevin Rodrigues (born 28 September 1988), known by his stage name Worakls, is a French electronic musician and composer. He is known for blending orchestral and electronic instrumentation with rock and pop influences. On tour, he performs solo, with a small group of instrumentalists (Worakls Band), or with a much larger touring orchestra (Worakls Orchestra).

== Early & personal life ==
Worakls comes from a musical family and started learning the piano at age three. After studying at a conservatory, he dedicated his time to electronic music and composition. At the age of 18, he began to create electronic music. He has found success with his remixes as well as his solo material and has shared that his influences are "mostly classical music, film music, and techno".

Worakls has a daughter, who inspired him to create the single "54".

== Career ==
In November 2014, he founded the label Hungry Music with his friends N'to and Joachim Pastor. A 2015 review in Billboard magazine referred to Worakls as a "rising French DJ" and described his tracks as "serious techno with a light touch", "full of focused, nervous energy."

Between 2020 and 2022, he released music on his own imprint, Sonate Records. In September 2023, Worakls signed to Decca Records, owned by Universal Music Group.

As of 2025, Worakls has released three studio albums, several EPs, one compilation, and numerous singles, some of which were produced with his 20-piece "Worakls Orchestra". His latest album, From One Blink to Another, was released on 10 October 2025 on Polydor. The first single, a collaboration with Carl Cox titled "No Boundaries", came out in July 2025. In December 2025, Worakls collaborated with Sting and Ekaterina Shelehova on a cover of the Beach Boys song "God Only Knows" and performed it live on the French television show Taratata alongside his touring orchestra.

== Discography ==
=== Studio albums ===
- Orchestra (2019)
- Sur Le Front Des Animaux Menacés (2020)
- From One Blink to Another (2025)

=== EPs ===
- Unity EP (2008)
- Deeply Infected EP (2009)
- All Night Long (2009)
- Shazam (2009)
- Deeply Infected (2009)
- Folie (2010)
- Roadtrip EP (2010)
- Street EP (2011)
- Chroniques Variees EP (2012)
- Rapafromage with Nicolas Cuer (2012)
- Et La Plue Tomba EP (2013)
- Good Night My Love (2013)
- Et la pluie tomba (2013)
- Question réponse (2015)
- Les forêts (From "Sur le Front des Forêts Françaises") (2021)
- By the Brook (Piano Remixes) (2021)

=== Compilations ===
- Hungry 5 (The Best of 5 Years) (2018 – compilation of Hungry Music artists)
- Orchestra (Remixes) (2022)

=== Live DVDs ===
- Worakls Orchestra – Baloise Session 2023 (2023)

=== Singles ===
- "When the Birds Go in the Wrong Way" (2010)
- "Future" (2010)
- "Tension" (2010)
- "Mirage" (2011)
- "Siehst Du Nicht (feat. Coni)" (2012)
- "Utopia/Porto" with N'to (2014)
- "Salzburg" (2014)
- "Flocon de neige" (2014)
- "Toi/Cerisier blanc" (2015)
- "Adagio for Square" (2015)
- "Mellotron" (2016)
- "Nocturne" (2017)
- "Sanctis" (2017)
- "Cloches" (2019)
- "Storm" with Rusanda Panfili (2020)
- "Hortari & Detached Motion Remixes" (2021)
- "Nikki & Entrudo Remixes" (2021)
- "Inked" (2021)
- "Hiba" with Sophie Ponjiclis (2022)
- "Pipeline" (2022)
- "54" (2022)
- "Sparkle" (2022)
- "Verbier" (2023)
- "Furia Electronica" (2024)
- "Furia Classica" (2024)
- "Lueur" (2024)
- "Morning Bliss" (2025)
- "No Boundaries" with Carl Cox (2025)
- "L'Amour, L'Amer, Le Chaos" with Lili Poe (2025)
- "Rome Is Burning" (2025)
