= Paul Kalkbrenner =

German electronic musician

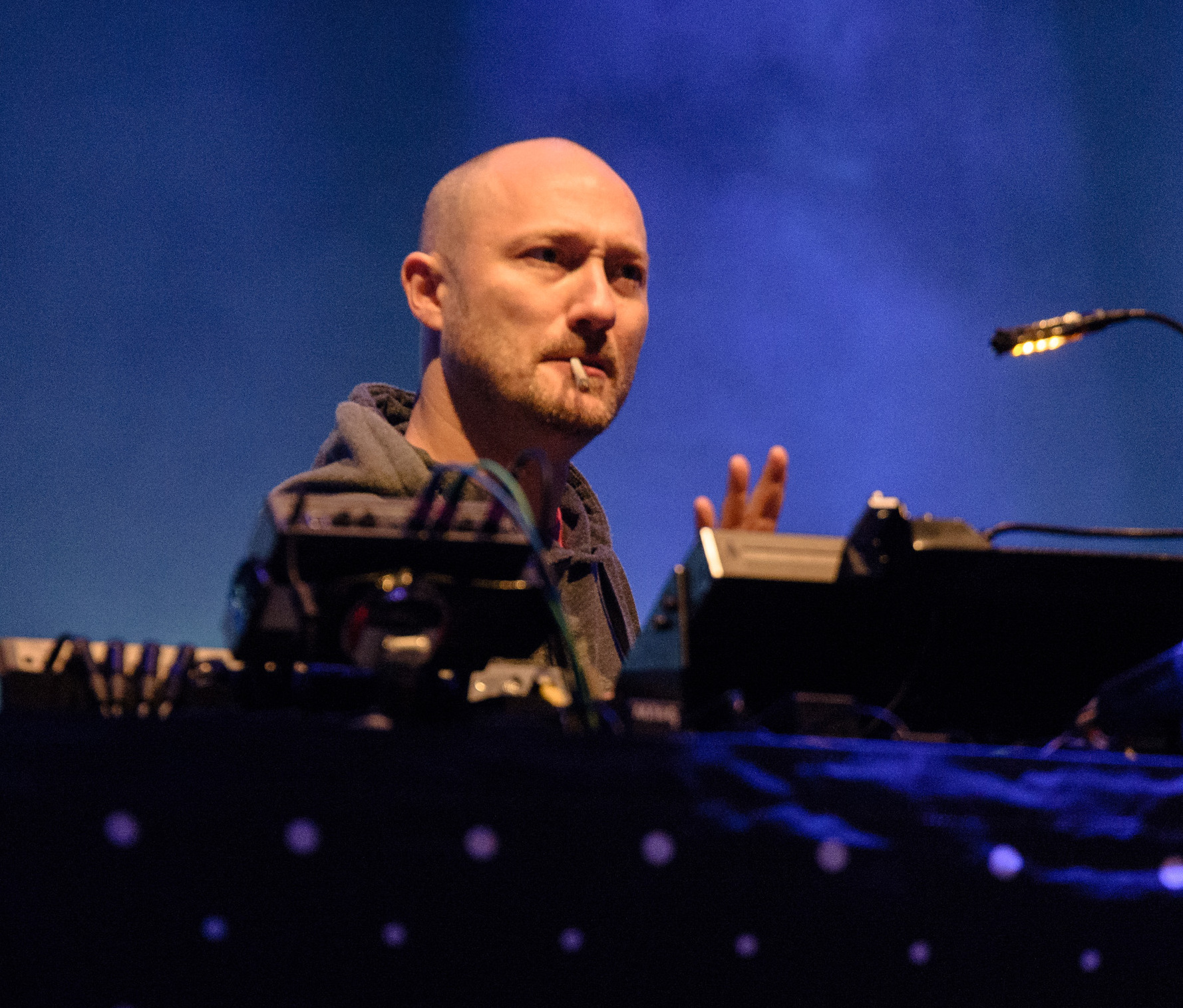
- Kalkbrenner in 2016

Background information
- Also known as: PK; Paul dB+; Kalkito; Grenade; DJ Ickarus; Maestro; Paulito
- Born: 11 June 1977 (age 49); Leipzig, East Germany
- Genres: Techno; ambient techno; house; electronica
- Occupations: Musician; producer
- Instruments: Turntables; keyboards; Ableton Live
- Years active: 1999–present
- Labels: Sony; Paul Kalkbrenner Musik; BPitch Control
- Website: paulkalkbrenner.net

Paul Kalkbrenner (German pronunciation: [paʊ̯l ˈkʰalkˌbʁɛnɐ]) (born 11 June 1977) is a German musician and producer of electronic music. Because he breaks down his tracks into elements that are reassembled onstage, Kalkbrenner is considered a live act, as opposed to a DJ. He is most known for his single "Sky and Sand", which sold over 200,000 copies, went platinum, and was highly charted in countries such as Belgium and Germany. He is also known for portraying the main character Ickarus in the movie Berlin Calling, written and directed by Hannes Stöhr, which ran for several years at Kino Central in Berlin.

== Biography ==
Paul Kalkbrenner grew up in Lichtenberg, Berlin, which was located deep in East Berlin. He was thirteen years old when the Berlin Wall came down and the Reunification of Germany occurred. This was also when he began to play records to his peers at the youth clubs of Berlin, despite the 11pm curfew set by his mother.

Kalkbrenner's early music performances were alongside schoolfriend Sascha Funke, with whom he shared a common interest in techno. Greatly admiring the Underground Resistance from Detroit, both Kalkbrenner and Funke spent 1992–1997 delving into record bins and familiarizing themselves with the best techno releases of the day. It was this, attending the clubs E-Werk, Planet, and Walfisch, and a radio show (Rave Satellite) they listened to every Saturday that led them to the techno scene. Meanwhile, at school, Kalkbrenner also learned the trumpet and studied music theory.

In 1995, at the age of eighteen, Kalkbrenner worked for two years as an editor in the television industry to fund the equipment he bought for production. During that time, Kalkbrenner and Funke lived together and began producing music on machines they both bought and borrowed. After getting into music production, Kalkbrenner decided he would like to only perform live with his own music.

Kalkbrenner is a keen football fan and avid supporter of FC Bayern Munich.

== Career ==
=== BPitch Control ===
Before Ellen Allien established BPitch Control as a record label, she was throwing BPitch parties all around Berlin. It was at one of her parties that Kalkbrenner and Funke met Allien. She came over to hear what they were working on, gave a few recommendations, and in 1999, Kalkbrenner released his first tracks on the Friedrichshain EP on BPitch Control under the name "Paul dB+." After releasing two albums, Superimpose (2001) and Zeit (2001), Kalkbrenner began to see album releases as his preferred format. His melodic sound, with its affinity for grand emotional gestures, obeyed the logic of the dancefloor, but his third album, Self (2004), introduced a narrative. The track "Gebrünn Gebrünn", released one year later, became a crossover hit. Kalkbrenner released six albums and ten EPs with BPitch Control, until his amicable departure in 2008.

=== Berlin Calling ===
After his release Self (2004), Kalkbrenner was approached by Berlin-based film director and long-time supporter of his work Hannes Stöhr, with the proposition of creating the soundtrack for Stöhr's movie about a Berlin DJ during the 2000s. In the course of their exchange, Stöhr had the realization that Kalkbrenner would be the perfect choice as the film's star. Kalkbrenner accepted the offer and they decided to title the film Berlin Calling.

In late 2006, he moved to Aix-en-Provence in the south of France with Funke for six months to work on the soundtrack. The hit track off of the album, "Sky and Sand", was produced with the vocals of his own brother, Fritz Kalkbrenner. In 2007, Kalkbrenner returned to Berlin to film the movie. Although the film is fictitious, Kalkbrenner was able to relate to the film's main character, Ickarus, who is mentally destroyed by the scene but still holds many amazing musical ideas inside his head. It is perhaps because of that correlation that Kalkbrenner's first venture into acting was well executed and successful. Ickarus is also a representation of who Kalkbrenner did not want to become.

After the movie's release in October 2008, the album went platinum, with over 200,000 records sold, and the song "Sky and Sand" topped charts for weeks. The movie premiered at the Locarno International Film Festival in Switzerland and was well received, turning into a cult classic in Europe. It broke the record of longest-run film in Germany, with over 145 weeks of continuous screenings at Kino Central in Berlin. In 2009, the movie was released on DVD.

=== Paul Kalkbrenner Musik ===
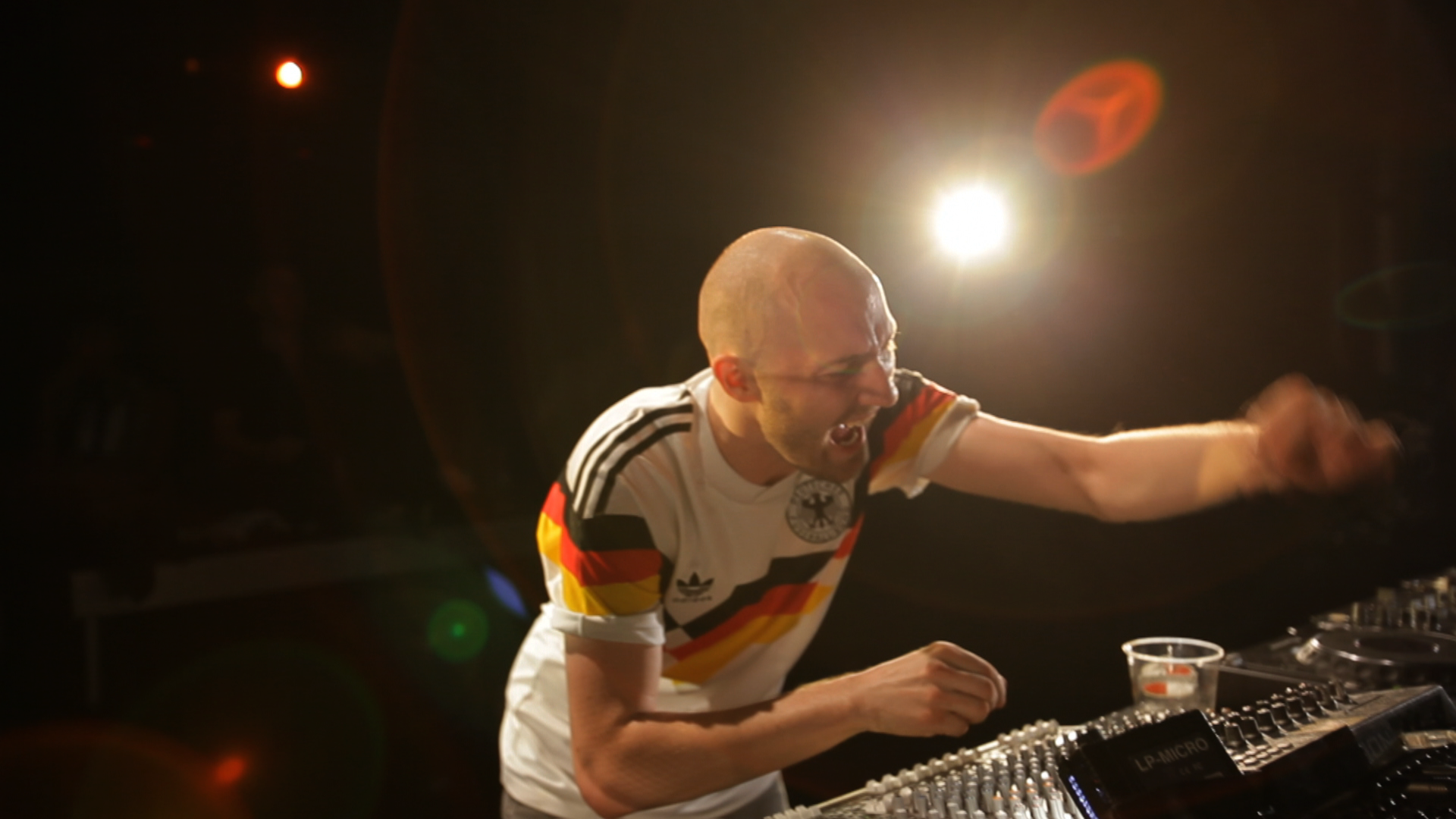
Kalkbrenner in the midst of playing

In 2009, after receiving widespread acclaim for the album Berlin Calling – The Soundtrack, Kalkbrenner decided that after ten years, it was time for him and BPitch to part ways, believing that the label was unable to support his artist growth. Wanting to do his own thing, Kalkbrenner created the label Paul Kalkbrenner Musik as a platform for his own music.

Kalkbrenner set out on a sold-out, intensive, twelve-city tour in 2010 that was filmed with the help of the team that created Berlin Calling and released as Paul Kalkbrenner 2010 – A Live Documentary. Since the founding of the label, it has seen the release of two albums. Icke Wieder (3 June 2011), which was heavily supported by DJs such as Sasha, ranked number two in the German music charts and ultimately reached gold status with over 100,000 CDs sold. The tour for the album brought together over 125,000 fans. That same summer, Kalkbrenner went to Ibiza for the first time to speak at the International Music Summit and play at one of Ibiza's renowned clubs, Amnesia.

On 30 November 2012, he released the album Guten Tag. In February 2013, he began to tour to support the new album in Europe and the U.S. Guten Tag topped the charts in Switzerland.

In 2025, Kalkbrenner released the single "Dreaming On," which features samples from Depeche Mode's song Dream On. It marked the first time that the band cleared one of their samples for release.

==== Florian Trilogy ====
In 2015, he announced the release of the "Florian Trilogy" as a warmup for his planned album titled 7, to be released on 7 August 2015. The music video for the first episode, "Cloud Rider", was released on 18 May 2015. The lyrics and vocals are performed by D Train with "You're the One for Me". Episode 2, called "Mothertrucker", was released on 12 June 2015. The third and final episode of the trilogy, "Feed your Head", was released on 17 July 2015. The lyrics for this song are from Jefferson Airplane's song White Rabbit. The episodes are set in America, the birthplace of techno. The episodes explain how the trilogy's titular character, Florian, eventually gets techno back to America, where it all started.

==== Back to the Future ====
In July 2016, Kalkbrenner dropped a three-volume mix series that chronicled the arrival of techno in Berlin in the early 1990s. Entitled Back To the Future, the project was part personal odyssey, part social history, documenting the birth of a musical moment that would forever change the landscape of Berlin and contemporary dance music.

In producing the trilogy, Kalkbrenner compiled a list of more than 5,000 tunes from 1987 to 1993 on YouTube, taking the tracks offline and gradually reducing the list, then cutting and editing the chosen tracks, sometimes just snippets of a song, to fit the mixtapes. With over 65 tracks and three volumes, Kalkbrenner takes listeners back to the tunes he heard as a young boy listening to the East Berlin radio station DT64. The tracks were made available for free on social media and topped over 1.5 million, gaining him some renowned press. Rolling Stone wrote „Viral, techno history lesson", Billboard magazin described BACK TO THE FUTURE as "work of historical excavation".

Starting in April 2017, Kalkbrenner performed a series of Back to the Future shows in smaller venues throughout Europe. These events saw him return to DJing, which, though he had only played live since 1998, was how he performed as a teenager in Berlin youth clubs. The European tour was sold out within a week.

==== Parts of Life ====
On 18 May 2018, Kalkbrenner released the album Parts of Life, his eighth album overall. Parts of Life features 15 tracks named with the file numbers Kalkbrenner used during production. Its cover art is a painting from his uncle, Paul Eisel, depicting a collection of "unique personal objects". He revealed three tracks as a special premiere for launching his album (Part Three, Part Six and Part Eight).

=== Production and live set-up ===
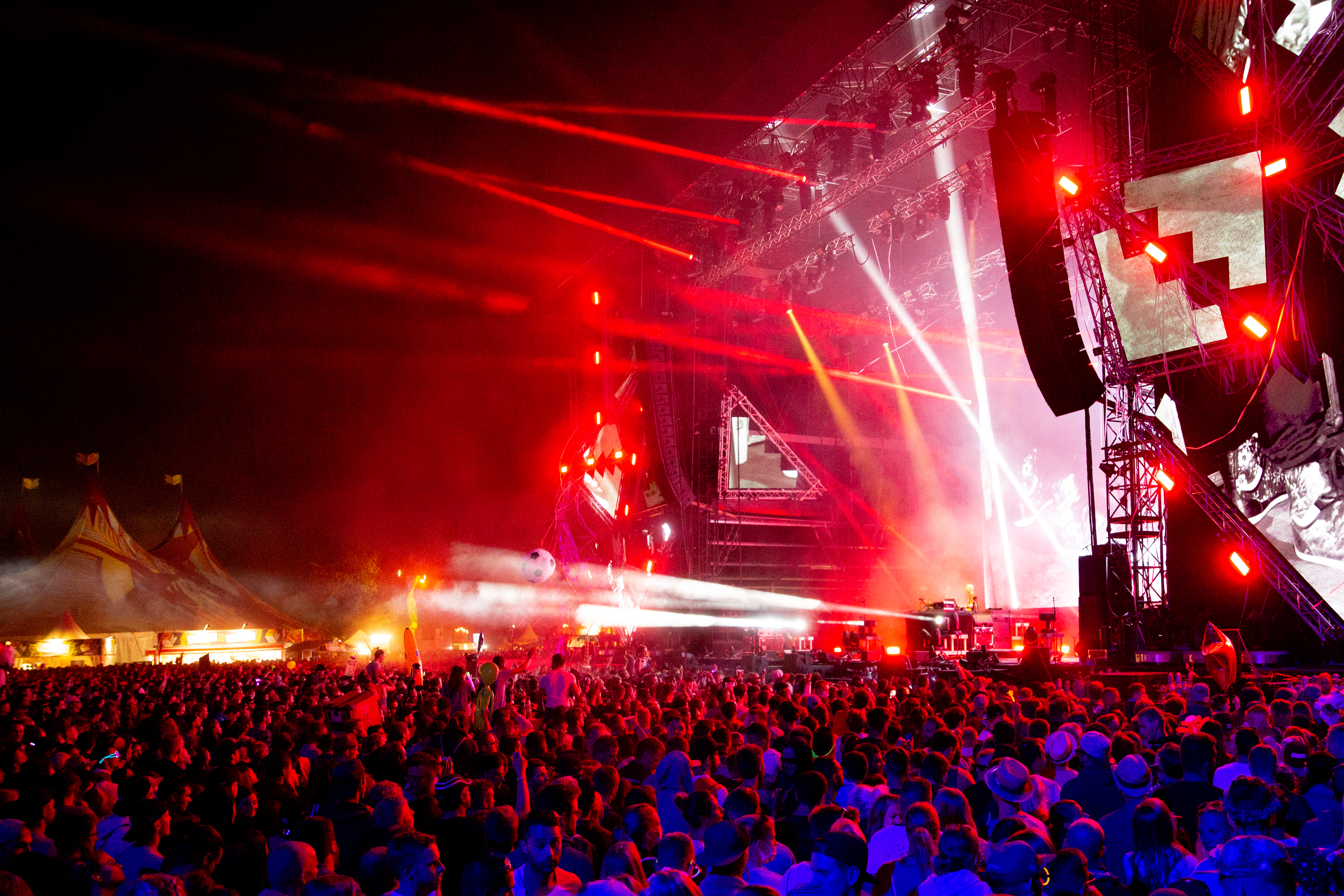
Kalkbrenner performing at SonneMondSterne Festival 2018

Kalkbrenner uses software synthesizers, a sequencer (Ableton Live) in combination with MIDI controllers, hardware synthesizers and drum machines for his live shows. It is a setup he feels comfortable with and does not foresee changing. In the early days, for production, Kalkbrenner used a Roland sampler, Amiga 500, Amiga 4000 Turbo, DAT, Roland S-750, and EFX. Since 2001, however, he has sold all his equipment and uses only Ableton Live for music production.

== Personal life ==
Paul Kalkbrenner is a grandson of the East German artist Fritz Eisel and older brother of music producer Fritz Kalkbrenner.

On 25 August 2012, Kalkbrenner married Romanian DJ/producer Simina Grigoriu.

== Discography ==
(selective)

=== Albums ===
Title	Year	Peak positions								Certifications
Title	Year	GER	AUT	BEL (FL)	BEL (WA)	FRA	ITA	NLD	SWI	Certifications
Icke wieder	2011	2	4	56	59	97	—	54	4	GER: Gold
Guten Tag	2012	4	8	41	83	142	84	69	1	GER: Gold
x	2014	56	—	119	119	—	—	—	46	
7	2015	1	1	5	3	11	9	5	1	GER: Gold
Parts of Life	2018	7	14	14	14	—	26	68	4	
The Essence	2025	5	5	5	5	24	78	25	6	
"—" denotes an album that did not chart or was not released.

=== EPs ===
Title	Year
Chrono EP	2001
Brentt EP	2002
Keule	2006

=== Soundtracks ===
Title	Year	Peak positions						Certifications
Title	Year	GER	AUT	BEL (FL)	BEL (WA)	NLD	SWI	Certifications
Berlin Calling: The Soundtrack	2009	31	38	24	78	100	56	GER: 5× Gold
2010 – A Live Documentary	2010	62	—	—	—	—	—	
Global Player (with Fritz Kalkbrenner & Florian Appl)	2010	—	—	—	—	—	—	
"—" denotes soundtrack that did not chart or was not released.

=== Singles ===
Title	Year	Peak positions								Certifications	Album
Title	Year	GER	AUT	BEL (FL)	BEL (WA)	FRA	ITA	NLD	SWI	Certifications	Album
"Sky and Sand" (with Fritz Kalkbrenner)	2009	29	37	2	11	146	—	7	56	AUT: Gold	Berlin Calling
"Cloud Rider"	2015	38	60	—	—	81	—	—	53	GER: Gold	7
"Mothertrucker"	2015	—	—	—	—	—	—	—	—		7
"Feed Your Head"	2015	50	74	—	—	110	—	—	—	GER: Gold	7
"No Goodbye"	2019	—	—	51	—	—	—	—	—		Non-album single
"Que ce soit clair" (with Stromae)	2025	—	—	23	3	40	—	—	44	BEL: Gold; FRA: Gold	The Essence
"—" denotes single that did not chart or was not released.

Albums

- Superimpose (BPitch Control, 2001)
- Zeit (BPitch Control, 2001)
- Self (BPitch Control, 2004)
- Icke Wieder (Paul Kalkbrenner Musik, 2011)
- Guten Tag (Paul Kalkbrenner Musik, 2012)
- 7 (Sony Music, 2015)
- Parts of Life (Columbia Records / Sony Music, 2018)

Compilation

- X (Paul Kalkbrenner Musik, 2014)

Soundtrack albums

- Berlin Calling: The Soundtrack (BPitch Control, 2008)
- Global Player Soundtrack (with Fritz Kalkbrenner et Florian Appl, Suol, 2013)

Mix album

- Maximalive (Minimaxa, 2005)

Remix album

- Reworks (BPitch Control, 2006)

EPs and singles

- Friedrichshain [as Paul dB+] (BPitch Control, 1999)
- Largesse [as Paul dB+] (Synaptic Waves, 1999)
- Gigahertz [as Paul dB+] (Cadeaux, 2000)
- dB+ (BPitch Control 2000)
- Performance Mode [as Grenade] (Cadeaux, 2001)
- Chromo (BPitch Control, 2001)
- Brennt (BPitch Control, 2002)
- Steinbesser (BPitch Control, 2003)
- F.FWD (BPitch Control, 2003)
- Press On (BPitch Control, 2004)
- Tatü-Tata (BPitch Control, 2005)
- Keule EP (BPitch Control, 2006)
- Altes Kamuffel (BPitch Control, 2007)
- Bingo Bongo (BPitch Control, 2008)
- Sky and Sand (with Fritz Kalkbrenner, BPitch Control, 2009)
- Das Gezabel (Paul Kalkbrenner Musik 2012)
- Der Stabsvörnern (Paul Kalkbrenner Musik, 2012)
- Der Buhold (Paul Kalkbrenner Musik, 2013)
- Cloud Rider (Sony Music, 2015)
- Mothertrucker (Sony Music, 2015)
- Feed Your Head (Sony Music, 2015)
- Part Eleven (Sony Music, 2018)
- Part Three (Sony Music, 2018)
- Part Fourteen (Sony Music, 2018)
- Part Seven (Sony Music, 2018)
- Part Four (Sony Music, 2018)
- Part Twelve (Sony Music, 2018)
- Part Two (Sony Music, 2018)
- Part Ten (Sony Music, 2018)
- Part Five (Sony Music, 2018)
- Part Fifteen (Sony Music, 2018)
- Part One (Sony Music, 2018)
- Part Nine (Sony Music, 2018)
- Part Thirteen (Sony Music, 2018)
- Part Six (Sony Music, 2018)
- Part Eight (Sony Music, 2018)
- No Goodbye (B1 Recordings, 2019)
- Parachute (B1 Recordings, 2020)
- Graf Zahl (B1 Recordings, 2021)

Remixes

- Ellen Allien "Dataromance" (BPitch Control 2001)
- Lexy / Autotune "Shibuya Love" (Jakuza / Low Spirit 2001)
- Die Raketen "The Sound für Zwischendurch" (Freundschaft Musik 2003)
- Sasche Funke "Forms & Shapes" (BPitch Control 2003)
- Agoria "Stereolove" (Different / PIAS 2004)
- Lexy & K-Paul "Happy Zombies" (Low Spirit Recordings 2005)
- Michel de Hey "Snert" (Hey! Records 2006)
- Error Error "Your Everlasting Breath" (Italic 2006)
- Ellen Allien & Apparat "Jet" (BPitch Control 2006)
- Chordian "Closed Eyes" (Soniculture 2007)
- Undo & Vicknoise "Submarino" (Factor City Records 2009)
- Modeselektor "200007" (BPitch Control 2009)
- Michel Cleis ft. Totó La Momposina "La Mezcla" (Strictly Rhythm 2009)
- 2raumwohnung "Wir Werden Sehen" (EMI 2009)
- Stromae "Te Quiero" (Polystar Records 2010)
- Fritz Kalkbrenner "Facing the Sun" (Suol 2010)
- Moby "Wait for Me" (Little Idiot 2010)
- Depeche Mode "Should Be Higher" (Miami Ad School Europe 2013)
- Jefferson Airplane "White Rabbit" (Sony Music 2015)
- Leonard Cohen "You Want It Darker" (Columbia Records 2016)
- NTO "Invisible" (Chapau under exclusive licence to AllPoints 2021)

== Filmography ==
- Berlin Calling (2008)
- Paul Kalkbrenner 2010 – A Live Documentary (2010)

== Awards ==
=== Berlin Music Video Awards ===
The Berlin Music Video Awards is an international festival that promotes the art of music videos.

Year	Nominated work	Award	Result	Ref.
2026	"Que Ce Soit Clair"	Best Experimental	Nominated	

=== DJ Magazine Top 100 DJ ===
Year	Position	Notes	Ref.
2010	84	Entry	
2011	62	+22	
2012	91	-29	
2013	—N/a	Exit	
2014	—N/a	Out	
2015	142	Out	
2016	139	Out (+3)	
2017	97	Re-entry (+42)	
2018	95	+2	
2019	91	+4	
2020	101	Re-exit (-10)	
