= Fritz Kalkbrenner =

German DJ and music producer (born 1981)

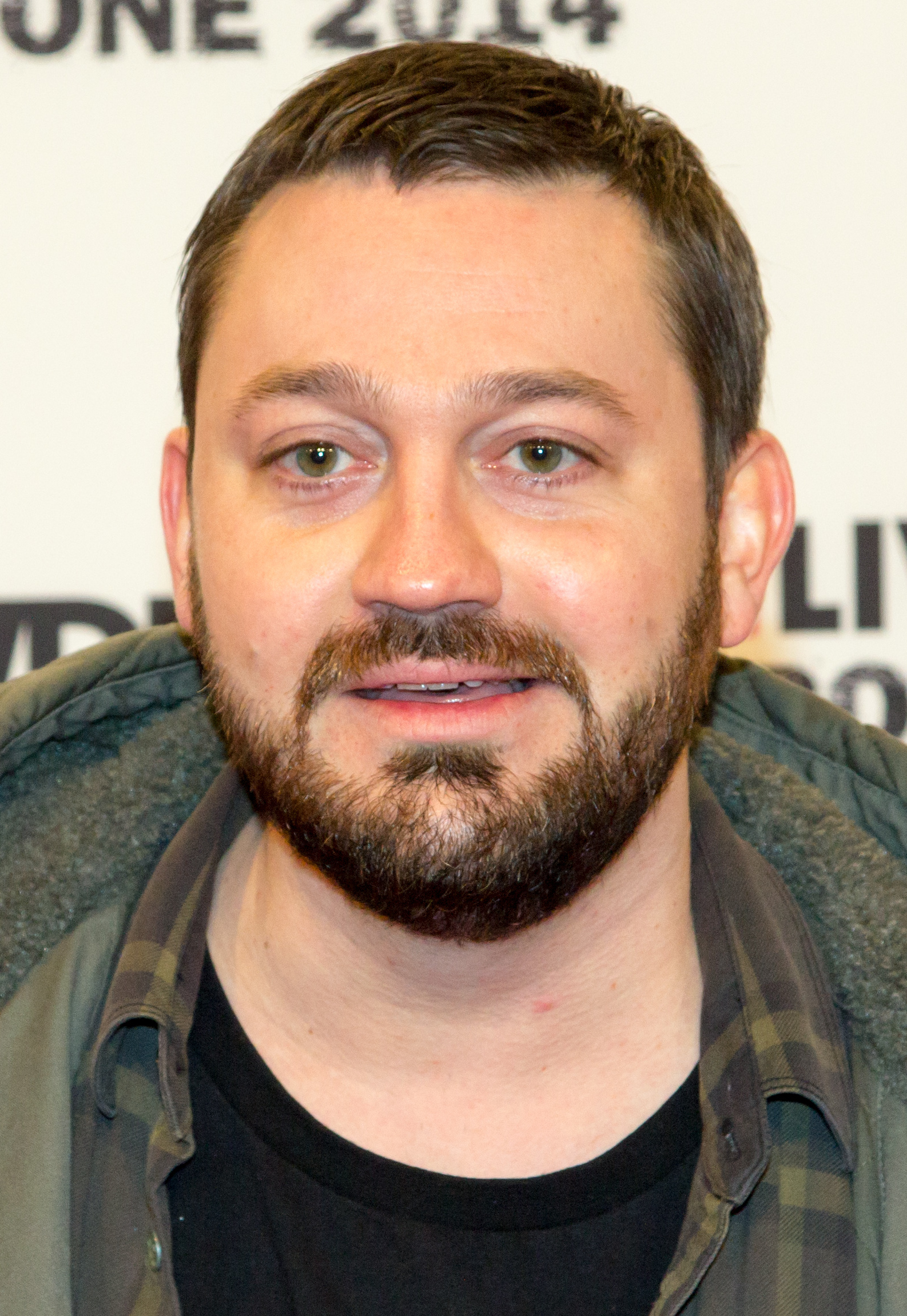
- Fritz Kalkbrenner in 2014

Background information
- Born: 1981 (age 43–44)
- Origin: Berlin, East Germany
- Occupation: Music producer
- Labels: Suol
- Website: fritzkalkbrenner.com

Fritz Kalkbrenner (born 1981) is a German DJ and music producer.

He is a grandson of the East German artist Fritz Eisel and younger brother of Paul Kalkbrenner.

== Discography ==
=== Albums ===
- Here Today Gone Tomorrow (Suol, 2010)
- Suol Mates (Suol, 2012)
- Sick Travellin' (Suol, 2012)
- Ways Over Water (Suol, 2014)
- Grand Départ (Suol, 2016)
- Drown (Suol, 2018)
- True Colours (Nasua, 2020)
- Third Place (Virgin Records, 2024)

=== Singles and EPs ===
- DJ Zky / Fritz Kalkbrenner – Stormy Weather (Cabinet Records, 2004)
- Paul & Fritz Kalkbrenner – Sky and Sand (BPitch Control, 2009)
- Chopstick & Johnjon feat. Fritz Kalkbrenner – A New Day (Baalsaal Music, 2009)
- Wingman EP (Baalsaal Music, 2009)
- The Dead End EP (Suol, 2010)
- Chopstick & Johnjon feat. Fritz Kalkbrenner – Keep On Keepin' On (Suol, 2010)
- Facing the Sun (Suol, 2010)
- Kings in Exile (Suol, 2010)
- Right in the Dark (Suol, 2011)
- Wes EP (Suol, 2011)
- Get a Life (Suol, 2012)
- Little by Little (Suol, 2012)
- Back Home (Suol, 2014)
- Void (Suol, 2015)
- One of These Days (Suol, 2015)
- In This Game (Suol, 2016)

== Films ==
- Berlin Calling (2008)
