= Hille =

Hille may refer to:

== Places ==
- Hille (Belgium), a hamlet
- Hille, Germany, a town in the Minden-Lübbecke district in the state of North Rhine-Westphalia, Germany
- Hille, Agder, an island in Lindesnes municipality in Agder county, Norway

== Other uses ==
- Hille (furniture), a British furniture manufacturer
- Hille equation, an equation that relates the maximum ionic conductance of an ion channel to its length and radius
- Hille IF, a Swedish football club located in Gävle in Gävleborg County

== People with the name ==
=== Surname ===
- Anastasia Hille (born 1965), an English film, television and theatre actress
- Arnoldus Hille (1829–1919), a Norwegian Lutheran Bishop
- Bertil Hille (born 1940), an American professor in the Department of Physiology and Biophysics at the University of Washington
- David Hille (born 1981), a former Australian-rules footballer
- Carl Einar Hille (1894–1980), an American mathematician
- Heinz Hille (1891–1954), a German screenwriter, film producer, and director
- Henk Hille (born 1959), a Dutch former ice hockey player
- Henrik Greve Hille (1881–1946), a Norwegian clergyman
- Howard Hille Johnson (1846–1913), an American blind educator and founder of the West Virginia Schools for the Deaf and Blind
- Kristin Hille Valla (born 1944), a Norwegian politician for the Centre Party
- Peter Hille (1854–1904), a German writer and poet
- Sebastian Hille (born 1980), a German football player and coach
- Sigurd Hille (born 1950), a Norwegian politician for the Conservative Party
- Veda Hille (born 1968), a Canadian singer and songwriter

=== Given name ===
- Hille Darjes (1944-2018), German actress and speaker
- Hille Perl (born 1965), German virtuoso performer of the viola da gamba and lirone
- Hille Sarapuu (born 1937), Estonian speed skater, cyclist and motorcycle rider
