= Annett Renneberg =

German actress and singer (born 1978)

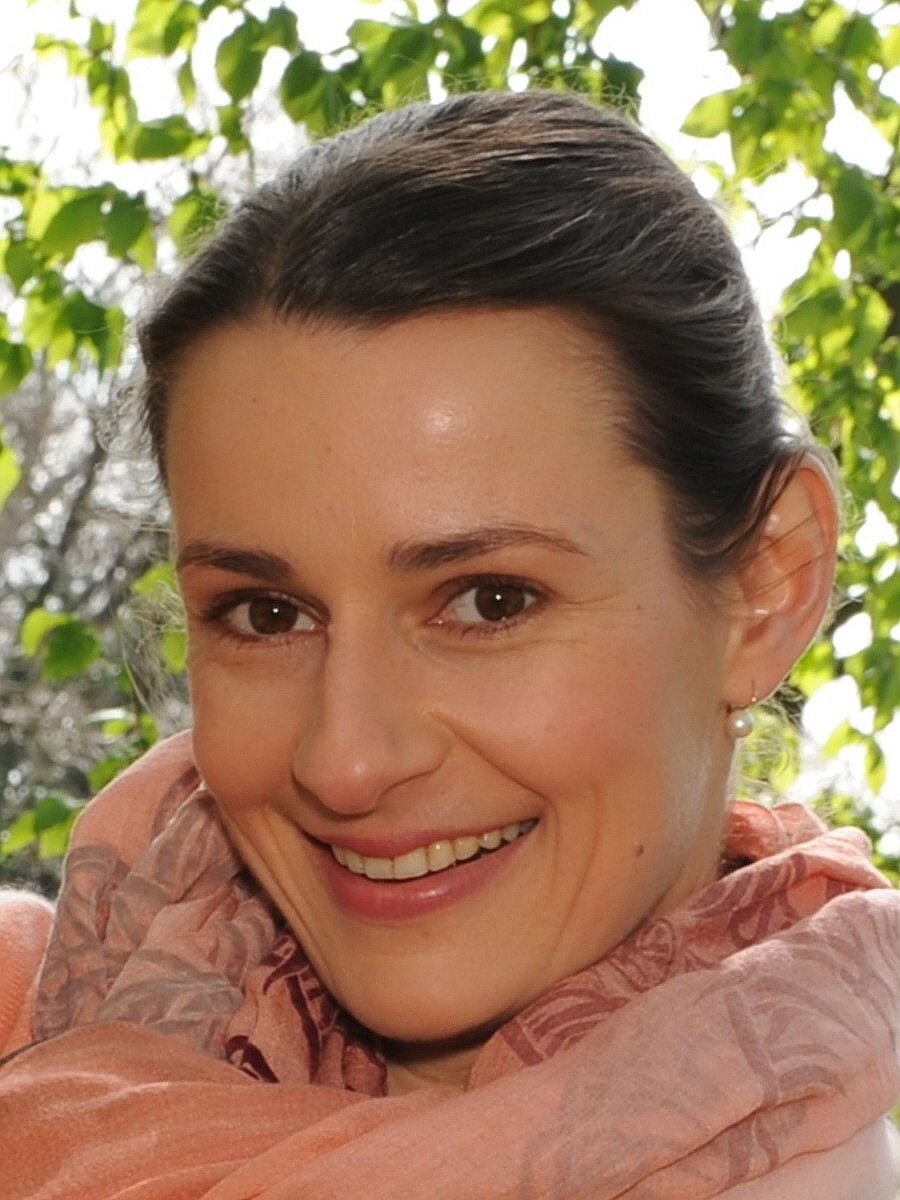
- Annett Renneberg (2014)
- Born: 16 March 1978 (age 47); Rudolstadt, East Germany
- Occupation: Actress

Annett Renneberg (born 16 March 1978 in Rudolstadt) is a German actress and singer.

== Biography ==
=== Early life and education ===
From the age of two, Renneberg lived in East Berlin, where she later attended high school. She also took lessons in singing, piano and accordion, and aspired to a career as an opera singer.

=== Career ===
In 1991, she was discovered at a casting call and landed the lead role in the crime film Die Brut der schönen Seele. In 1995, she played her second major role in the film Maja and was nominated for her performance for a Telestar.

After graduation in 1997, Renneberg wanted to study operatic singing but instead received an offer by director Peter Zadek, for a speaking and singing role in his production of Rise and Fall of the City of Mahagonny at the Salzburg Festival.

Renneberg discovered her love of the theater, and other stage engagements followed in the next few years, mainly working with Peter Zadek. Renneberg has also played in more than 50 TV and cinema productions. She played the role of Signorina Elettra Zorzi in the film adaptations of Donna Leon's Commissario Brunetti novels.

Since 2006, she performs her own stage programs, and sings, recites, and performs with various other artists. From 2009 to 2011, she played the role of Senior Commissioner Catharina Brandt in Stolberg.

=== Personal life ===
Annett Renneberg has lived in Mecklenburg-Vorpommern since summer 2014.

== Theater ==
- 1998: Aufstieg und Fall der Stadt Mahagonny von Bertolt Brecht, Rolle: Erzähler und Mädchen – Regie: Peter Zadek, Salzburger Festspiele
- 1999–2006: Hamlet von William Shakespeare, Rolle: Ophelia und Fortinbras – Regie: Peter Zadek, Wiener Festwochen
- 2004–2005: Lina von Markus Hille, Rolle: Lina – Regie: Uwe Eric Laufenberg, premiere, Hans Otto Theater Potsdam
- 2004–2008: Peer Gynt von Henrik Ibsen, Rolle: Solveig – Regie: Peter Zadek, Berliner Ensemble
- 2008: Nackt by Luigi Pirandello, Rolle: Ersilia – Regie: Peter Zadek, Dt. Uraufführung, St.-Pauli-Theater Hamburg
- 2008: Siegfrieds Frauen und Die letzten Tage von Burgund, Rolle: Kriemhild, Nibelungenfestspiele in Worms – Regie: Dieter Wedel

== Film ==
- 1999: Hinter dem Regenbogen, directed by Jan Peter
- 2000: Der Atemkünstler, directed by Marco Kreuzpaintner
- 2003: Devot, directed by Igor Zaritzki
- 2003: Liberated Zone, directed by Norbert Baumgarten
- 2004: Schatten, directed by Markus Engel
- 2004: Erbsen auf halb 6, directed by Lars Büchel
- 2005: Marie, directed by Alexandre Powelz

== Television ==
- 1992: Die Brut der schönen Seele, directed by Rainer Behrend
- 1996: Maja, directed by Volker Maria Arend
- 1997: Das Böse, directed by Christian Görlitz
- 1997: Cologne's Finest, directed by Ralf Huettner
- 1997: Blutige Scheidung – Mein Mann läuft Amok, directed by Manuel Siebenmann
- 1997: Ein Fall für zwei – Ende einer Täuschung, directed by Bodo Fürneisen
- 1998: Francis, directed by Angelika Mönning
- 1999: Kommissar Rex – Der Verlierer, directed by Michi Riebl
- 2000: Donna Leon – Vendetta, directed by Christian von Castelberg
- 2000: Donna Leon – Venezianische Scharade, directed by Christian von Castelberg
- 2000: Models, directed by Mark von Seydlitz
- 2001: Kolle – Ein Leben für Liebe und Sex, directed by Susanne Zanke
- 2001: Tatort – Der Präsident, directed by Thomas Bohn
- 2001: Engel sucht Flügel, directed by Marek Gierszal
- 2001: Der blaue Vogel, directed by Dietmar Klein
- 2001: Zwei Brüder – Abschied, directed by Andy Bausch
- 2002: Ein starkes Team – Kollege Mörder, directed by Peter F. Bringmann
- 2002: Donna Leon – In Sachen Signora Brunetti, directed by Sigi Rothemund
- 2002: Donna Leon – Nobiltà, directed by Sigi Rothemund
- 2003: Die Cleveren – Engelchen flieg, directed by Christiane Balthasar
- 2003: Der letzte Zeuge – Haut aus Eisen, directed by Bernhard Stephan
- 2003: Donna Leon – Venezianisches Finale, directed by Sigi Rothemund
- 2003: Berlin – Eine Stadt sucht den Mörder, directed by Urs Egger
- 2003: Donna Leon – Feine Freunde, directed by Sigi Rothemund
- 2004: Donna Leon – Sanft entschlafen, directed by Sigi Rothemund
- 2004: Donna Leon – Acqua alta, directed by Sigi Rothemund
- 2004: Die Cleveren – Auf der Flucht, directed by Christiane Balthasar
- 2004: Die Cleveren – Killer im Kopf, directed by Christiane Balthasar
- 2005: Unter weißen Segeln – Odyssee der Herzen
- 2005: Donna Leon – Beweise, dass es böse ist, directed by Sigi Rothemund
- 2005: Donna Leon – Verschwiegene Kanäle, directed by Sigi Rothemund
- 2005: Tatort – Rache-Engel, directed by Robert Sigl
- 2006: Tatort – Unter Kontrolle, directed by René Heisig
- 2006: Tatort – Feuerkämpfer, directed by Thomas Bohn
- 2006: Donna Leon – Endstation Venedig, directed by Sigi Rothemund
- 2006: Donna Leon – Das Gesetz der Lagune, directed by Sigi Rothemund
- 2007: Die Wölfe, directed by Friedemann Fromm
- 2007: Reife Leistung!, directed by Martin Gies
- 2008: Donna Leon – Die dunkle Stunde der Serenissima, directed by Sigi Rothemund
- 2008: Donna Leon – Blutige Steine, directed by Sigi Rothemund
- 2009: Der Mann aus der Pfalz
- 2009: Donna Leon – Wie durch ein dunkles Glas, directed by Sigi Rothemund
- 2009: Rahel – Eine preussische Affäre, directed by Catharina Deus
- 2009–2012: Stolberg (19 episodes)
- 2010: Unter anderen Umständen: Tod im Kloster
- 2010: Donna Leon – Lasset die Kinder zu mir kommen
- 2011: Donna Leon – Das Mädchen seiner Träume
- 2012: Donna Leon – Schöner Schein
- 2013: Donna Leon – Auf Treu und Glauben
- 2014: Donna Leon – Reiches Erbe
- 2015: Donna Leon – Tierische Profite
- 2016: Donna Leon – Das goldene Ei
- Since 2017 In aller Freundschaft (TV Series)

== Awards ==
- 1997: Nominierung für den Telestar (Beste Darstellerin in einem Fernsehspiel) für Maja
- 2002: Lilli-Palmer-Gedächtniskamera (Beste Nachwuchsdarstellerin)
- 2003: Vornominierung für den Deutschen Filmpreis als beste Schauspielerin für ihre Rolle in Devot
