= Hille Darjes =

German actress and radio play speaker

Hille Darjes (1944, Quelkhorn – 23 December 2018, Worpswede) was a German actress and radio play speaker.

== Live ==
Hille Darjes received a theatrical education in Hamburg at the "Hochschule for music and theatre". In 1984, she founded together with some colleagues the "Bremer Shakespeare Company". In 1992 she left the company and worked as a free actress in theatre and on the radio and held readings.

== Plays and performances ==
- The Tragedy of King Lear
- Twelfth Night
- Othello
- The invention of the freedom

== Radio plays ==
=== Broadcasting company ===
- In Donna Leon to fiction (as Paola Brunetti):
  - Death at La Fenice,
  - Death in a Strange Country,
  - The Anonymous Venetian,
  - Acqua Alta,
  - A Venetian Reckoning,
  - The Death of Faith

=== Sound carrier (choice) ===
- Ruhelos, Schwäbisch Hall, Steinbach Sprechende Bücher, in 2009
- Emilia Galotti, Berlin: Argon publishing company in 2007
- Der Hofmeister oder Vorteile der Privaterziehung, Argon-Verlag, in 2007
- A Long Way Down, Munich: Der Hörverlag, in 2005
- Acqua alta, Munich: Der Hörverlag, in 2004
- Venezianische Scharade, Munich: Der Hörverlag, in 2004
