= University of Maryland Global Campus =

Public university in Adelphi, Maryland, US

- Former names: College of Special and Continuation Studies (1947–1959); University of Maryland University College (1959–2019)
- Type: Public university
- Established: 1947; 79 years ago
- Parent institution: University System of Maryland
- Accreditation: MSCHE
- Academic affiliations: CUWMA
- Endowment: $2.10 billion (2023) (system-wide)
- President: Gregory Fowler
- Chief Academic Officer: Blakely Pomietto
- Faculty: 3,793
- Students: 63,012 (fall 2024)
- Undergraduates: 52,187
- Postgraduates: 10,825
- Location: College Park, Maryland, United States; 38°59′8.93″N 76°57′24.12″W
- Campus: Large suburb
- Magazine: Achiever
- Colors: Yellow, Black and Red
- Website: www.umgc.edu

The University of Maryland Global Campus (UMGC), formerly known as the University of Maryland University College from 1959 to 2019, is a public university in College Park, Maryland, United States. Established in 1947 as the College of Special and Continuation Studies of the University of Maryland, College Park, UMGC is dedicated to serving working adults, military service members, veterans and their families. UMGC offers online, hybrid, and face-to-face instruction at education centers across the Washington–Baltimore metropolitan area, throughout Maryland, and around the world. It is the largest institution in the University System of Maryland.

UMGC is open to all applicants for undergraduate and graduate programs, and is among the top 10 recipients of the federal G.I. Bill benefits. The university offers 135 academic programs in online, hybrid and face-to-face classes, including bachelor's, master's, and doctoral degrees, as well as undergraduate and graduate certificates. UMGC is accredited by the Middle States Commission on Higher Education.

== History ==
Inn & Conference Center

UMGC is an outgrowth of the evening program for adults at the University of Maryland, which began in the 1920s. In 1947, the College of Special and Continuation Studies (CSCS) was established. In 1959, The CSCS became the University of Maryland University College (UMUC). In 1970, UMUC became an independent institution, and was a founding member of the University System of Maryland in 1988.

UMUC formerly had an international campus in Schwäbisch Gmünd, Germany, until 2002. It also ran a two-year residential campus in Munich, from 1950 to 1992, which then moved to Augsburg, from 1993 to 1994, and then to Mannheim, in 1995 until it finally closed in 2005. The residential campus offered a two-year associate degree and mainly served high school graduate children of U.S. military and government personnel stationed in Europe.

In 2023, UMGC has more than 175 classroom and service locations on military installations and other education centers throughout the U.S., Europe, the Middle East, as well as in Asia. In 2004, UMUC shared the ICDE Prize of Excellence from the International Council for Open and Distance Education.

=== University name ===
Known as University of Maryland University College until 2019, it was a college in the traditional American sense of the word. However, the college was associated with a university; hence, it was a "University College." The "University of Maryland" prefix indicated the historical entity to which the college belonged originally. In the university's name, "University College" represented "the specialized concentration on professional development," while "University of Maryland" represented the affiliation of the university with the University System of Maryland.

When UMUC first opened in 1947, the school was named College of Special and Continuation Studies within the University of Maryland, College Park. In 1953, Raymond Ehrensberger, chancellor of the institution at that time, wanted to change the name to something more meaningful and less cumbersome for people to say and remember. Early suggestions for the name included College of General Studies, College of Adult Education and University College.

In 1959, Chancellor Ehrensberger persuaded the University of Maryland's Board of Regents to change the name to University of Maryland University College. The name "University College" was adopted from the British university system to depict an educational institution offering "courses and programs from all academic departments outside the university's walls and normal class times." Therefore, UMUC was not a division of the University of Maryland, College Park, but rather a separate institution within the University System of Maryland.

In 2019, the university announced that its name would change to "University of Maryland Global Campus." The name change request was submitted as SB 201 and HB 319 in the 2019 regular session of the Maryland General Assembly. The name change was enacted into law on April 18, 2019 when the bill was signed by Maryland Governor Larry Hogan.

== Academics ==
UMGC is one of the largest online public universities in the United States. Courses are delivered in online, hybrid and face-to-face formats. Even before the advent of online education by way of the World Wide Web, UMGC was a distance education pioneer and offered distance learning using its WebTycho interface by way of dial-up access. UMGC later adopted the use of the Web for connectivity to its online classrooms, as well as using television and correspondence courses to deliver course content.

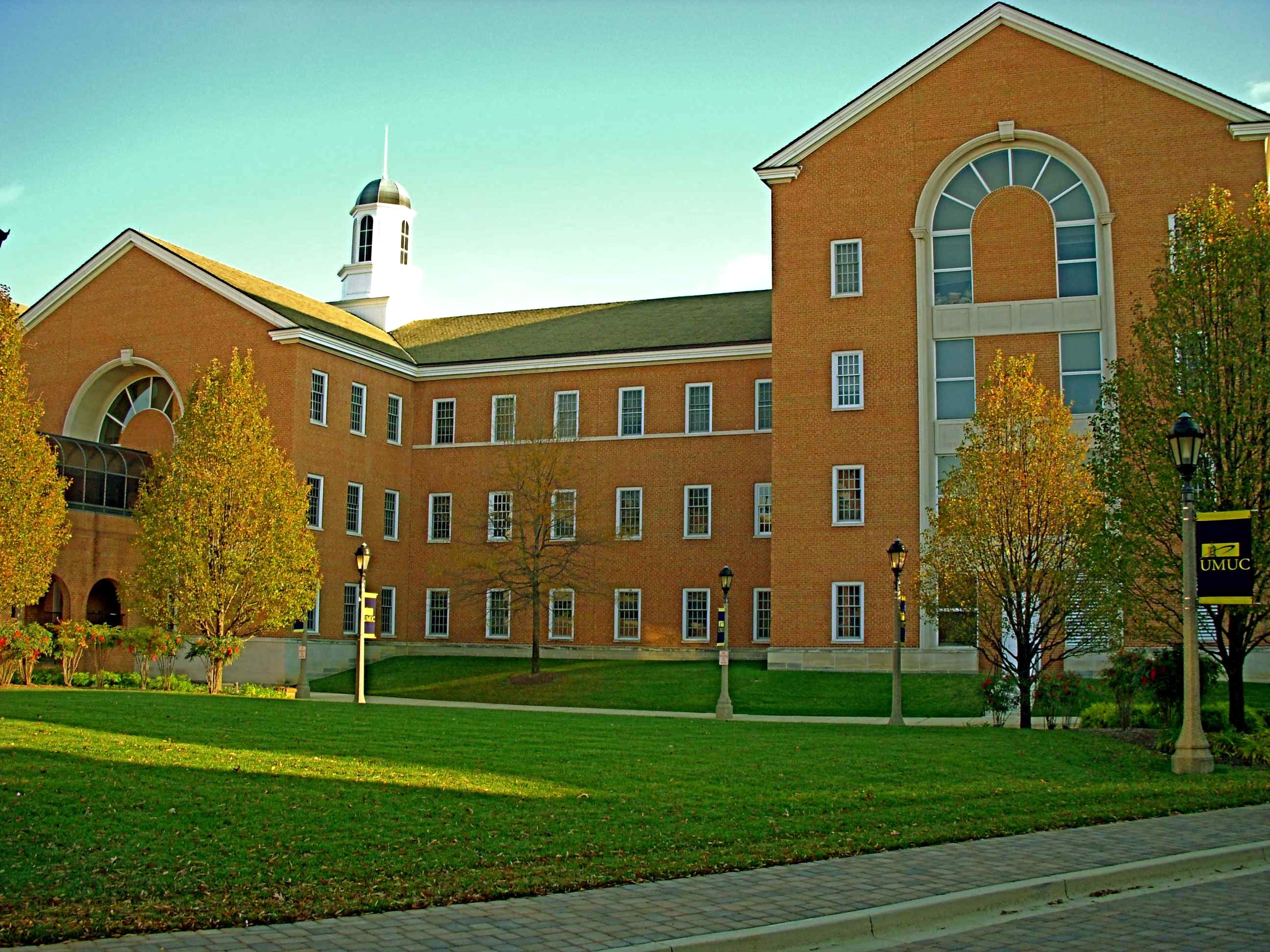
Student and Faculty Services Center

The university has three schools:

- School of Integrative and Professional Studies
- School of Business
- School of Cybersecurity and Information Technology

UMGC offers more than 30 bachelor's degree programs and undergraduate certificates, awarded in cybersecurity, biotechnology, business management, computers/information technology, communications, criminal justice/legal studies, and social sciences. Undergraduate students can earn credit through coursework and prior-learning programs, which recognize professional and workplace experience, including military service.

UMGC offers more than 55 master's degree programs, graduate certificates, and doctoral degrees. Most graduate programs are available in online and hybrid formats.

=== U.S. military locations ===
UMGC offers face-to-face courses and support for students at U.S. military locations in Bahrain, Djibouti, Egypt, Kuwait, Qatar, United Arab Emirates, Australia, Guam, Japan, Okinawa, Singapore, South Korea, Diego Garcia, Spain, and Italy.

== Campuses ==
=== Headquarters / main campus ===
The headquarters for UMGC is located in Adelphi, Maryland near the campus of the University of Maryland, College Park. Until late 2000, the UMGC headquarters was listed in College Park, Maryland. To establish its own identity as an independent university, UMGC changed its postal address to Adelphi, an unincorporated community that borders College Park. The address change with the U.S. Postal Service involved no physical move of people and facilities. The marketing decision to change its postal address was one of many undertaken by UMGC to distinguish the university as one of the largest distance-education centers, with over 248,000 students enrolled worldwide in FY 2015.

College Park Marriott Hotel & Conference Center adjacent to the University of Maryland in Adelphi, Maryland

=== UMGC Headquarters ===
UMGC retrofitted its headquarters in Adelphi, Maryland, to meet "green" building requirements for LEED certification. UMGC followed the same process as it did to achieve LEED certification in 2005 for its Inn & Conference Center, which became the first hotel complex in the United States to achieve certification as a green building.

==== Baltimore-Washington metropolitan area ====
In the greater Baltimore-Washington Metropolitan Area, classes are held at 20 locations, including on the campus of University of Maryland, College Park. The satellite campuses offer varying academic services, including advising and computer labs.

UMGC operates a facility in Dorsey Station (Md) adjacent to the Dorsey MARC Train Station. In partnership with Maryland community colleges and other University System of Maryland institutions, UMGC offers courses and degree programs at several higher education centers throughout the state. It also offers classes and advising services at the College of Southern Maryland. A consortium of universities led by Anne Arundel Community College, including UMGC, operates a higher education center adjacent to Arundel Mills mall in Hanover, Maryland. In addition, the University offers courses at the Universities at Shady Grove and University System of Maryland at Hagerstown, which are part of the University System of Maryland.

==== Global locations ====
In Europe, the Middle East, and Asia, UMGC offers courses on military bases for service members, contractors, Federal employees, and their families. In addition to distance learning via the Web, the university offers on-site, instructor-led classes and/or services at 175 overseas US military bases in 20 countries throughout the world. Overseas instruction is coordinated through its Europe Division, which covers USCENTCOM installations in the Middle East, and Asia Division. UMGC divisional headquarters are located in Kaiserslautern, Germany (following the closure of United States Army Garrison Heidelberg) and on Yokota Air Base, Tokyo, Japan, respectively.

== Students ==
Undergraduate demographics as of Fall 2023
Race and ethnicity	Total
White	33%
Black	26%
Hispanic	18%
Unknown	11%
Two or more races	5%
Asian	5%
American Indian/Alaska Native	1%
Native Hawaiian/Pacific Islander	1%
International student	1%
Economic diversity
Low-income (Note: The percentage of students who received an income-based federal Pell grant intended for low-income students.)	29%
Affluent (Note: The percentage of students who are a part of the American middle class at the bare minimum.)	71%

UMGC specializes in distance learning for adult, non-traditional students in Maryland, across the country, and around the world by operating education centers and offering online instruction. In FY 2023, the university enrolled almost 53,000 military-affiliated students from around the world. In FY 2023, more than 32,000 Marylanders attended UMGC.

About three-quarters of the undergraduate students attend part-time. Over 92% of UMGC students are employed full-time. The majority of undergraduate students are female. The median age of stateside undergraduate students is 31. Almost two-thirds of the graduate MBA students are married, half are female, and over a third are minorities. Over a third of UMGC's stateside students were African-American, and this minority group earned over a third of the degrees awarded by the university.

== Rankings and awards ==
UMGC was ranked #1 in The Military Times “Best for Vets: Colleges 2015” list of top online and nontraditional schools in 2015. Military Times “Best for Vets” is one of the most respected and comprehensive rankings for veterans who are considering higher education. The publication looked at U.S. Department of Education statistics on student success and academic quality, as well as areas such as university culture, student support, and academic policies in evaluating hundreds of schools.

== Notable alumni ==
=== Academia ===
Name	Class year	Notability	Reference(s)
Januarius Jingwa Asongu	2002	Philosopher (developer of Critical Synthetic Realism), prolific author, founder and chancellor of Saint Monica University	
Scheherazade Forman		Dean of Student Development Services at Prince George's Community College	
Arthur Quinn Tyler Jr.	1978	Former president of Sacramento City College	

=== Arts and entertainment ===
Name	Class year	Notability	Reference(s)
Dale Dye		United States Marine Corps retired captain and actor	
Deanna McCray-James	2011, 2008, 2005	Chief of Marketing and Outreach at the Library of Congress; Mrs. District of Columbia America 2009 and Mrs. Maryland United States 2005.	
Deshauna Barber	2015	The first woman serving in the military to be crowned Miss USA (2016)	

=== Business ===
Name	Class year	Notability	Reference(s)
Robert Hastings		Senior Vice President of Communications for Bell Helicopter	

=== Government and public policy ===
Name	Class year	Notability	Reference(s)
Elizabeth Bobo		Former member of the Maryland House of Delegates	
Frank D. Boston		Former member of the Maryland House of Delegates	
Christopher Emery		Current Chief Enterprise Architect of the U.S. Securities and Exchange Commission and former White House Usher	
Hakan Fidan		Foreign Affairs Minister of Turkey and former chief of the Turkish National Intelligence Organization	(in Turkish)
Michael A. Grinston		16th Sergeant Major of the Army	
Thomas E. Hutchins		Former Maryland State Delegate for District 28 and former Secretary of the Maryland State Police	
Vivek Kundra	2001 (MS)	First Federal Chief Information Officer of the United States	
David Mitchell		Current University of Maryland, College Park chief of police and former Secretary of the Delaware Department of Safety and Homeland Security	
Robert R. Neall		Former Maryland State Senator and State Delegate	
Edward J. Perkins		19th United States Ambassador to the United Nations and former Director of the Diplomatic Corps for the United States Department of State	
James N. Robey	1979	State Senator, 13th District of Maryland	
Rory Respicio		Democratic Majority Leader for the Legislature of Guam	
Thom Tillis	1997	Current junior United States senator for North Carolina	
Joseph Tydings		Former United States Attorney for Maryland	
John William Vessey, Jr.	1963	Former Chairman of the Joint Chiefs of Staff and retired Army general	

=== Sports ===
Name	Class year	Notability	Reference(s)
Ray Lewis	2004	former NFL football player with the Baltimore Ravens	
Jalen Rose	2005	former NBA player and current broadcaster on ESPN	

=== Notable students ===
Name	Class year	Notability	Reference(s)
Frederick H. Bealefeld III		Former Baltimore police commissioner	
Barbara A. Frush		Current Maryland State Delegate for District 21	

== Notable faculty ==
Name	Department	Notability	Reference
Betsy Boze		Senior Fellow at the AASCU	
Jiří Březina		Current geology professor	
Barrie Ciliberti		Former Maryland Delegate and dean at Bowie State University	
Eric B. Dent	Mathematics	Complexity theory expert	
Laurence J. Gillis		Member of the New Hampshire House of Representatives	
Donald L. Graham		District Judge for the United States District Court for the Southern District of Florida	
J. Greg Hanson	Computer Science and Information Technology	First Assistant Sergeant at Arms and chief information officer of the United States Senate	
Donna Leon		Author of the Brunetti series, including Death at La Fenice	
Patrick Mendis	Public Policy & Trade	Author of Trade for Peace and Commercial Providence	
Charlene R. Nunley		Former president of Montgomery College, former member of the Commission on the Future of Higher Education, and current professor	
Walter Ratliff	Humanities/Philosophy	Associated Press journalist	
Arnold Resnicoff		Former U.S. Navy Chaplain and National Director of Interreligious Affairs for the American Jewish Committee	
David P. Weber	Accounting	Woodrow Wilson National Fellowship Foundation Fellow and former Assistant Inspector General for Investigations, and whistleblower, concerning the Bernard Madoff, Allen Stanford, and Cyber-compromise matters.	
Christopher Yavelow		Composer	
