= Donna Leon (TV series) =

German television series

- Also known as: Commissario Brunetti
- Country of origin: Germany
- No. of episodes: 26

Production
- Running time: 86–90 min

Original release
- Release: 2000 – 2019

Donna Leon is the author of the Commissario Guido Brunetti crime novels series that was adapted as the German television series Commissario Brunetti. The television program, which features music by André Rieu and has been produced 2000–2019 by the ARD in Germany, is also shown in Spain and in Finland by Yle.

== Actors ==
- Commissario Guido Brunetti: Joachim Król (episode 1–4), Uwe Kockisch (since episode 5)
- Paola Brunetti (Brunetti's wife): Barbara Auer (episode 1–4), Julia Jäger (since episode 5)
- Vice-Questore Patta: Michael Degen
- Sergente Lorenzo Vianello: Karl Fischer
- Signorina Elettra Zorzi: Annett Renneberg
- Raffaele ("Raffi") Brunetti: Patrick Diemling
- Chiara Brunetti: Laura-Charlotte Syniawa
- Sergente Alvise: Dietmar Mössmer
- Dottore Aurino: Ueli Jäggi

== Episodes ==
No. Title First broadcast Novel

- 1. "Vendetta" (12 October 2000) #4 Case · 1995
- 2. "The Anonymous Venetian" (16 October 2000) #3 Case · 1994
- 3. "Fatal Remedies" (10 October 2002) #8 Case 1999
- 4. "A Noble Radiance" (17 October 2002) #7 Case · 1998
- 5. "Death at La Fenice" (23 October 2003 ) #1 Case · 1992
- 6. "Friends in High Places" (31 October 2003) #9 Case · 2000
- 7. "The Death of Faith" – aka "Quietly in Their Sleep" (28 October 2004) #6 Case · 1997
- 8. "Acqua Alta" – aka "Death in High Water" (11 Nov. 2004) #5 Case · 1996
- 9. "Doctored Evidence" (13 October 2005) #13 Case · 2004
- 10. "Uniform Justice" (10 Nov. 2005) #12 Case · 2003
- 11. "Death in a Strange Country" (19 October 2006) #2 Case · 1993
- 12. "A Sea of Troubles" (2 Nov. 2006) #10 Case · 2001
- 13. "Wilful Behaviour" (15 May 2008) #11 Case · 2002
- 14. "Blood from a Stone" (22 May 2008) #14 Case · 2005
- 15. "Through a Glass, Darkly" (22 October 2009) #15 Case · 2006
- 16. "Suffer the Little Children" (7 October 2010) #16 Case · 2007
- 17. "The Girl of His Dreams" (28 Apr. 2011) #17 Case · 2008
- 18. "About Face" (14 Apr. 2012) #18 Case · 2009
- 19. "A Question of Belief" (11 May 2013) #19 Case · 2010
- 20. "Rich Inheritance"
- 21.
- 22.
- 23.
- 24.
- 25.
- 26. "Earthly Remains" (25 December 2019) #26 Case · 2017

== See also ==
- List of German television series

Available online by subscription on MHz Choice: "Donna Leon" series—first18 broadcast,2 interviews; Donna Leon, Uwe Kockisch. Accessed 16 March 2018. German with English subtitles, and the occasional common Italian expression in Italian. Average 1.55 run time.
