= Pellestrina =

Island in northern Italy

Coordinates: 45°16′24″N 12°18′04″E

Native name: Pellestrina
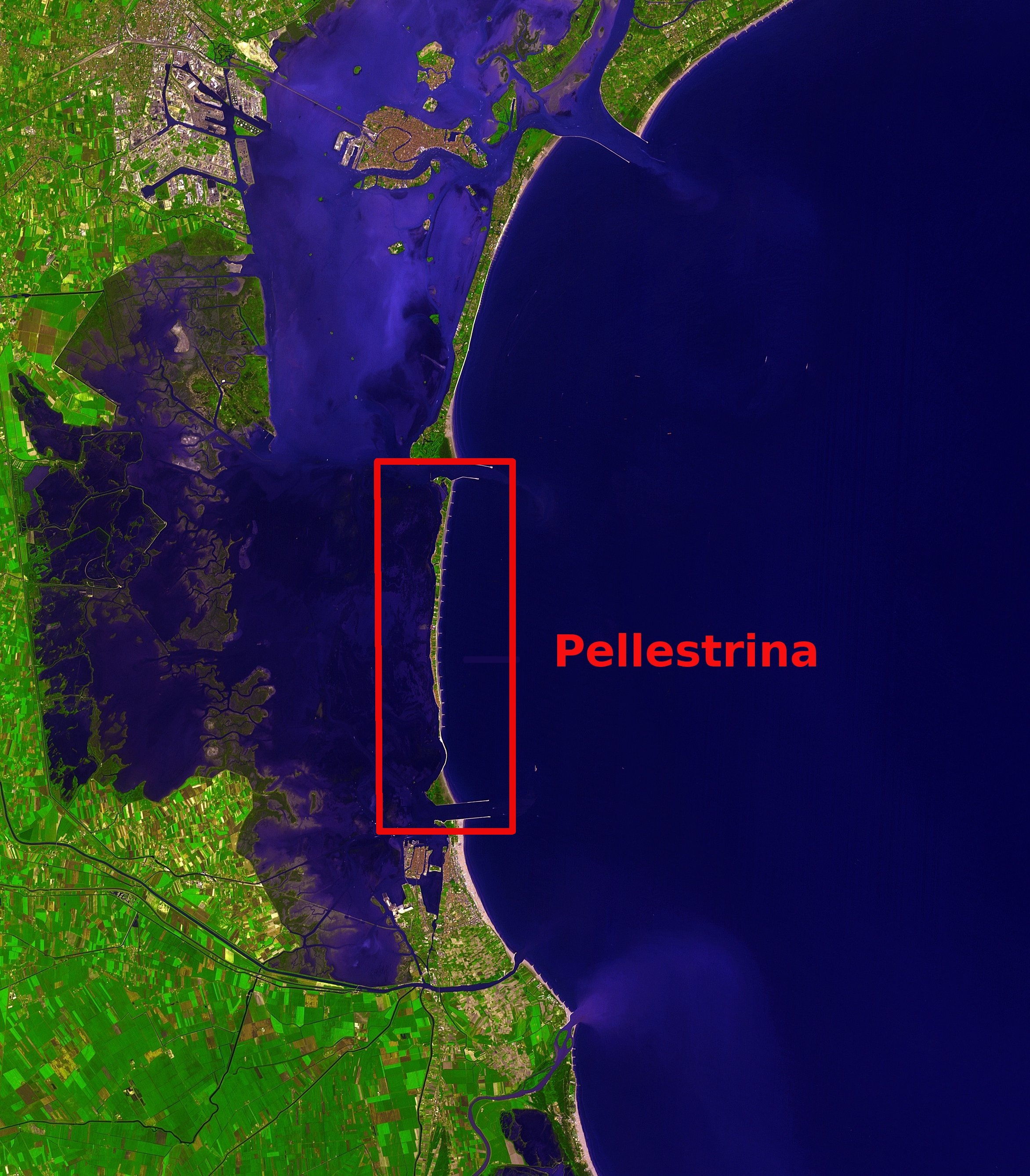
- Southern part of the Venetian Lagoon (Pellestrina highlighted)
- Interactive map of Pellestrina

Geography
- Location: Italy
- Archipelago: Venetian Lagoon
- Length: 12 km (7.5 mi)
- Width: 5–500 m (16–1,640 ft)

Administration
- Italy
- Region: Veneto
- Province: Province of Venice
- Largest settlement: Pellestrina

Demographics
- Population: About 5000

Pellestrina is an island in northern Italy, forming a barrier between the southern Venetian Lagoon and the Adriatic Sea, lying south west of the Lido.

The island is 11 kilometres (7 miles) long and has since the eighteenth century been bounded to its seaward side by large embankments. There are four main villages: San Pietro in Volta, Porto Secco, Sant' Antonio di Pellestrina, and Pellestrina, known for their colourfully-painted houses.

The main industries of the island are market gardening, fishing, tourism and lace making. Like that in Chioggia but unlike that in Torcello, the local lace is made with a needle. Attractions on the island included the Lido of Ca' Roman, known for its pine trees and birdlife.

== In fiction ==
Donna Leon's crime fiction novel A Sea of Troubles (2001) takes place on Pellestrina. The protagonist, Commissario Guido Brunetti of the Venice police, must solve the murders of two clam fishermen off the shore of Pellestrina and encounters great difficulty conducting an investigation when faced with the island's close-knit community, bound together by a code of loyalty and a suspicion of outsiders. Though a native of Venice, which is a short boat ride away, to the islanders he is a foreigner.

Cenzo Vianelli, the hero of The Girl from Venice (2016), a novel written by Martin Cruz Smith, lives and works as a fisherman in Pellestrina in 1945.

== Gallery ==
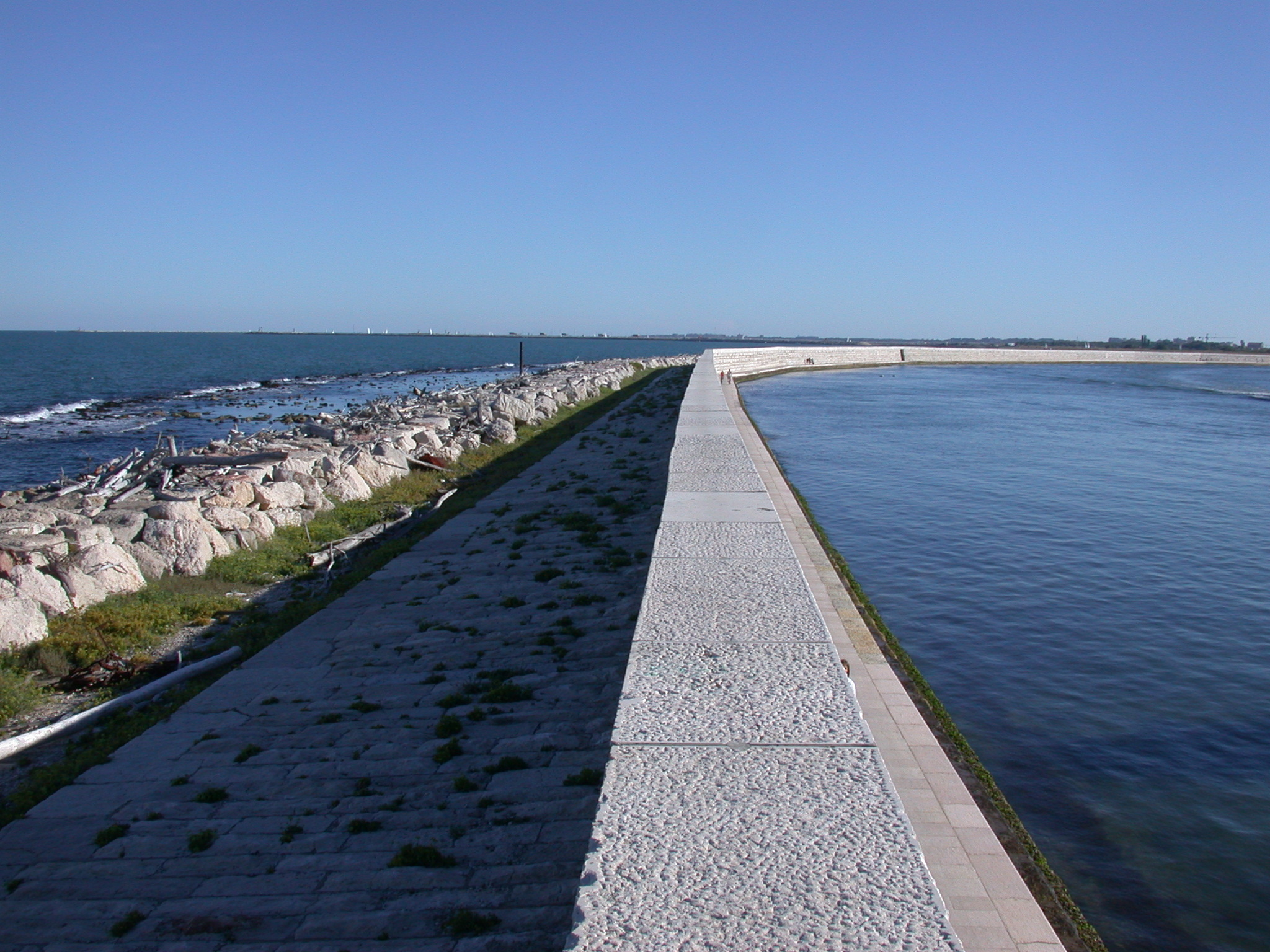
View of the wall

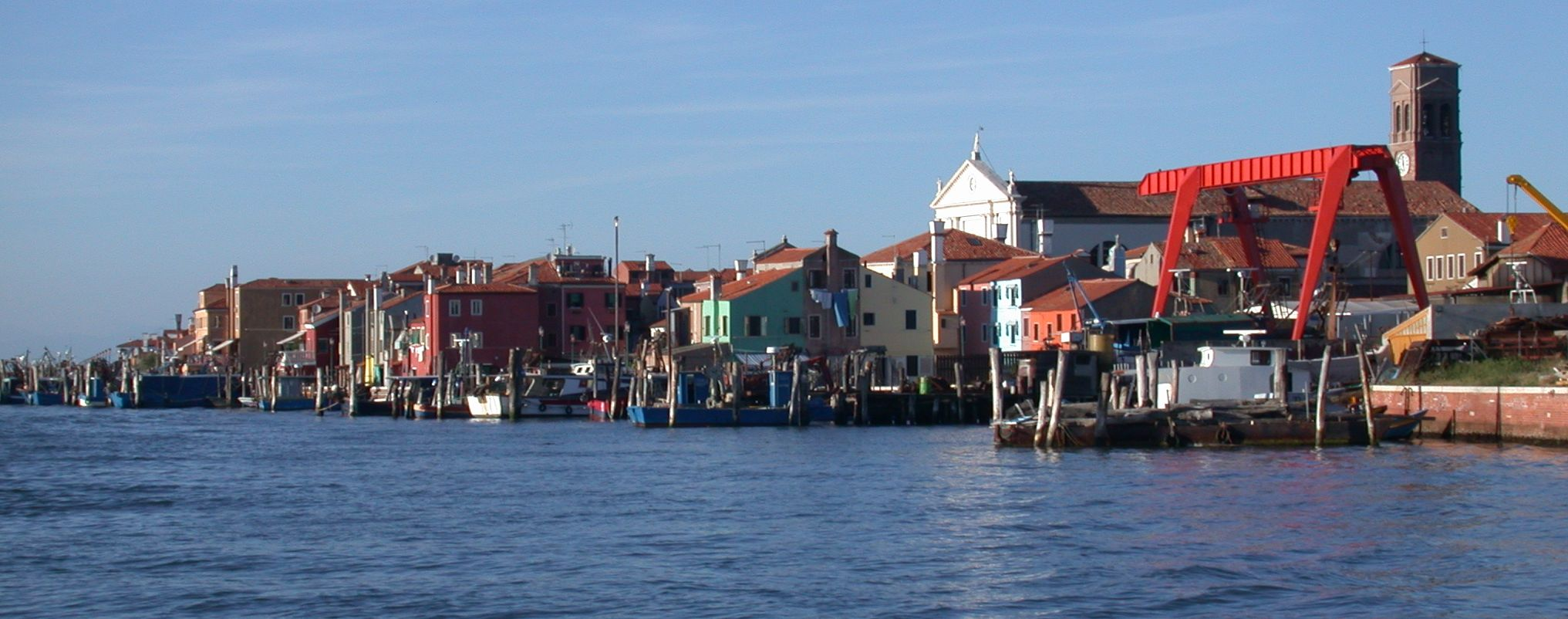
Pellestrina view from the boat dock

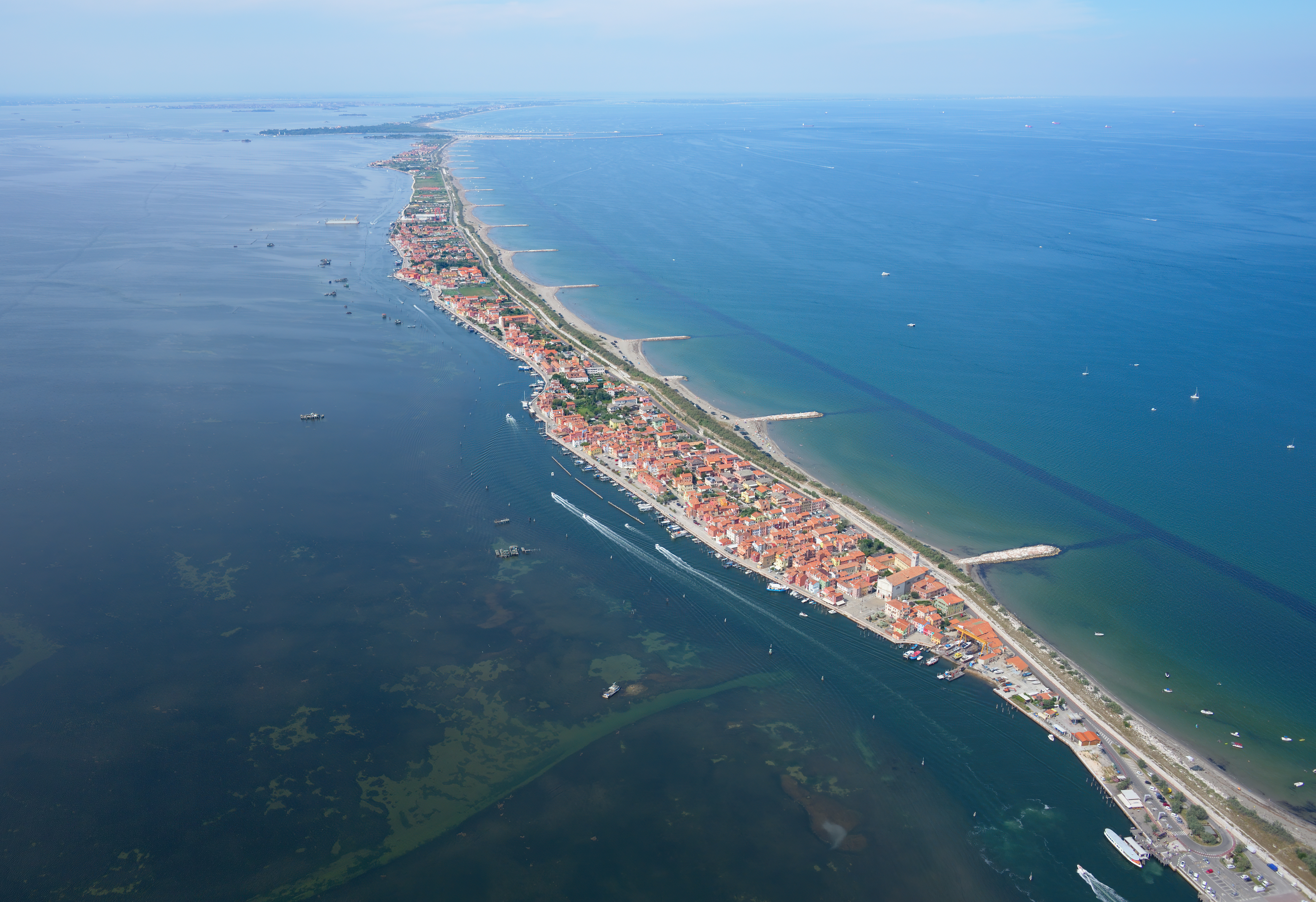
Aerial view from the southwest

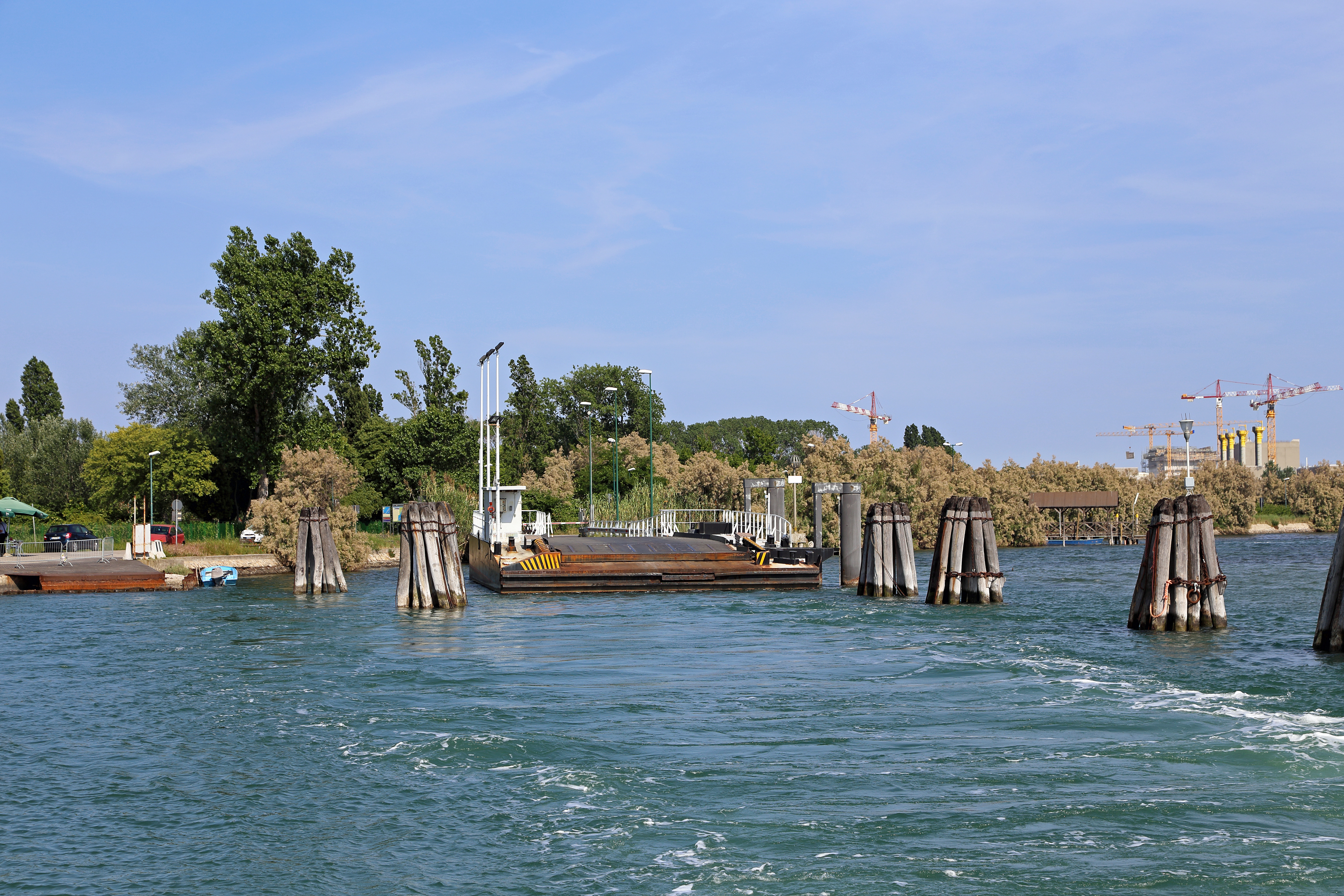
Landing stage of Santa Maria del Mare (Pellestrina) seen from the ferry leaving for the Lido

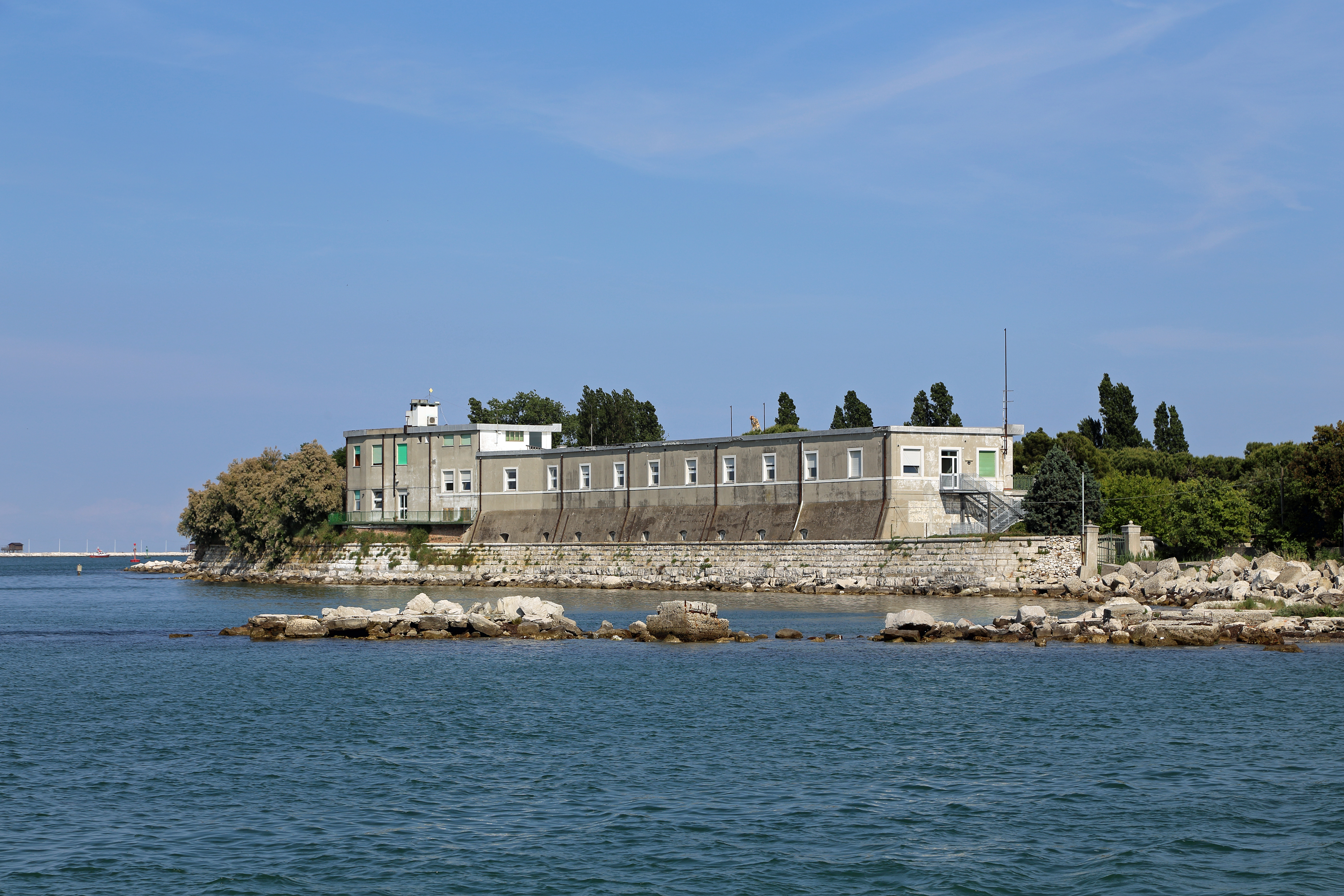
The Casa dell'Ospitalità at the northern point of Pellestrina Island

== See also ==
- List of islands of Italy
