= Sarapuu (surname) =

Family name

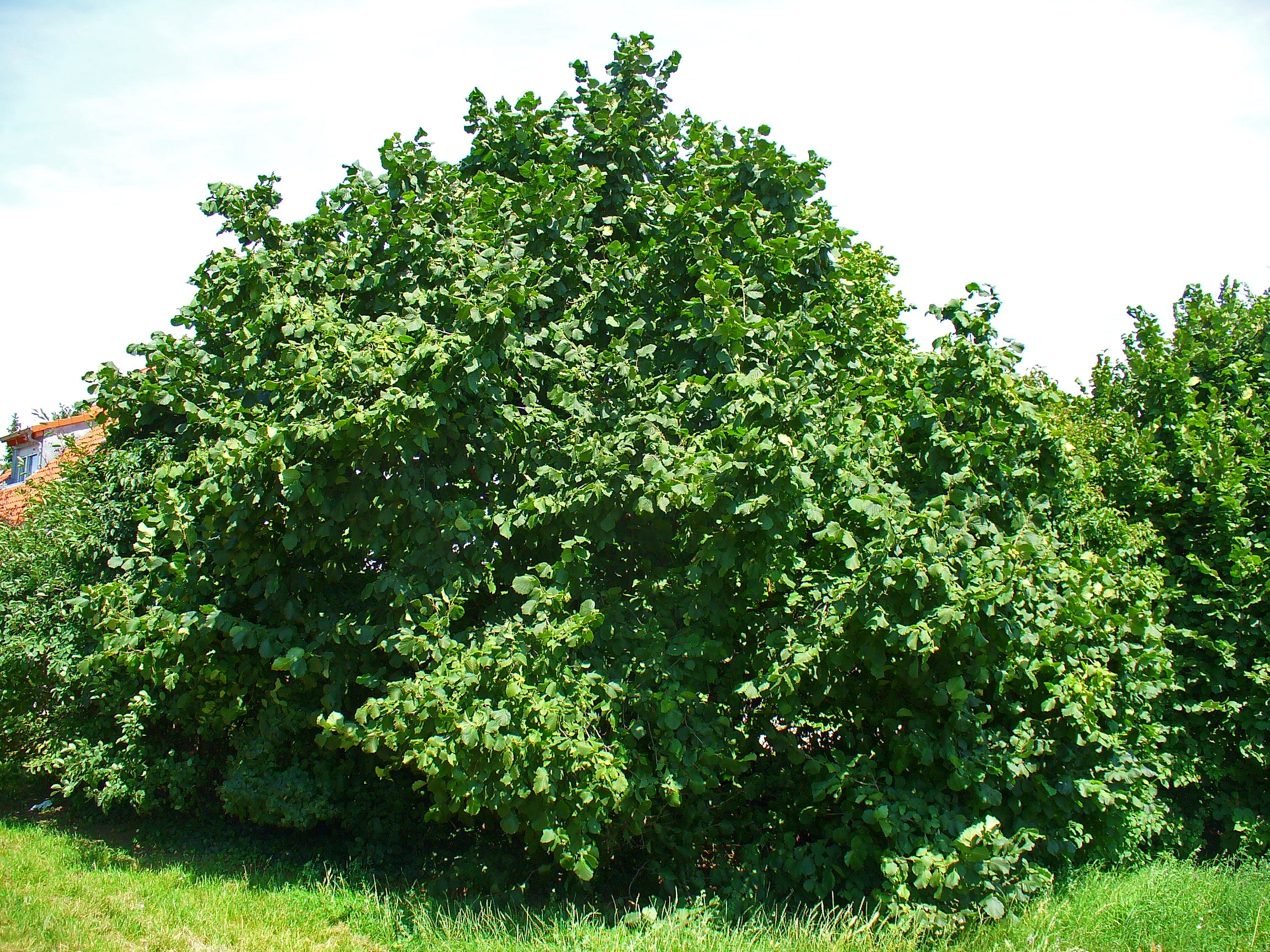

Origin
- Language: Estonian
- Meaning: hazel (Corylus)
- Region of origin: Estonia

Other names
- Variant form: Sarapu
- Related names: Sarapik

Sarapuu is an Estonian surname meaning "hazel" (Corylus). As of 1 January 2022, 116 men and 124 women in Estonia have the surname Sarapuu. Sarapuu is ranked as the 661th most common surname for men in Estonia, and the 679th most common surname for Estonian women. The surname Sarapuu is the most common in Pärnu County, where 6.94 per 10,000 inhabitants of the county bear the surname. Notable people bearing the surname Sarapuu include:

- Ortvin Sarapu (born Ortvin Sarapuu; 1924–1999), Estonian-born New Zealand chess player
- Aleksander Sarapuu (1941–2009), Estonian singer
- Arne Sarapuu (born 1950), Estonian mountaineer (:et)
- Arvo Sarapuu (1953–2020), Estonian businessman and politician
- Heiki Sarapuu (born 1965), Estonian competitive runner
- Hille Sarapuu (born 1937), Estonian speed skater, cyclist and motorcyclist
- Kersti Sarapuu (born 1954), Estonian politician
- Lembit Sarapuu (born 1930), Estonian painter
