= Uwe Kockisch =

German actor (1944–2025)

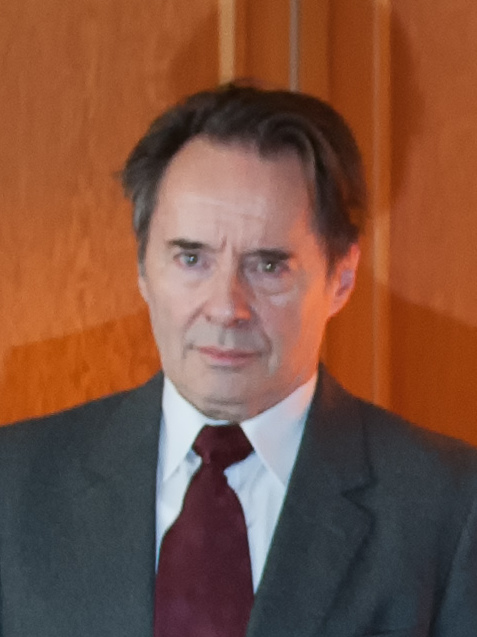

Uwe Kockisch (31 January 1944 – 22 December 2025) was a German stage, screen and television actor.

== Career ==
Kockisch completed his training to become an actor at the Ernst Busch Academy of Dramatic Arts in East Berlin. He accepted engagements in Cottbus and Karl-Marx-Stadt (Chemnitz). He appeared in plays at the Maxim Gorki Theater for over 20 years and later, for two years, at the Schaubühne in Berlin.

He began working in the film industry in 1974. In 1981, he played the lead role in Dein unbekannter Bruder (Your Unknown Brother), available at Netflix, an East German film by Ulrich Weiss. Kockisch appeared in such crime series as Tatort and Polizeiruf 110, and played an inspector in the TV series Zappek. In 2003-2019 he portrayed Commissario Guido Brunetti in 22 television films based on the crime novels by Donna Leon. From 2010 he held one of the lead roles in the miniseries The Weissensee Saga: A Berlin Love Story, as the Stasi officer Hans Kupfer. This series grew into four seasons with 24 episodes portraying the story of a Berlin family before, during and after the fall of the Berlin Wall.

== Personal life and death ==
Kockisch was born in Cottbus, Germany on 31 January 1944. As a youth, he attempted to escape from East Germany, but was caught and had to spend a year in prison.

He was married and later lived in Madrid, Spain. Kockisch died of lung cancer in Madrid on 22 December 2025, at the age of 81.

== Awards ==
- 2008: Uwe Kockisch received the Adolf Grimme Award for Best Lead Actor in the "Fiction" category, for his role in the movie City for Ransom by Dominik Graf.
- 2011: Deutscher Fernsehpreis representing the actors for the six-part miniseries The Weissensee Saga: A Berlin Love Story.

== Selected filmography ==
- 1973: Education Before Verdun (TV mini-series)
- 1975: Für die Liebe noch zu mager
- 1975: Die schwarze Mühle (TV)
- 1978: Unser Drache Kasimir (TV)
- 1978: Marx und Engels – Stationen ihres Lebens (TV series)
- 1979: Lachtauben weinen nicht
- 1981: Unser kurzes Leben (Our Short Life)
- 1981: Bürgschaft für ein Jahr
- 1982: Dein unbekannter Bruder (Your Unknown Brother)
- 1982: Sabine Kleist, 7 Jahre… (Sabine Kleist, Aged Seven...)
- 1984: Die Zeit der Einsamkeit
- 1985: Erscheinen Pflicht
- 1986: Rabenvater
- 1988: Treffen in Travers
- 1990: Grönland
- 1992: The Mystery of the Amber Room
- 1992: Miraculi
- 1994: Ärzte: Die Narbe des Himmels (TV)
- 1995: Operation Medusa (TV)
- 1995–1996: Zappek (TV series)
- 1996: Polizeiruf 110 - Kurzer Traum (TV episode)
- 1997: Berlin – Moskau (TV)
- 1997: Rosamunde Pilcher - Stunde der Entscheidung (TV episode)
- 1998: The Big Mambo
- 1998: Abgehauen (TV)
- 1998: Unsere Kinder! - Verschollen im Urlaub (TV)
- 1999: Gestern ist nie vorbei (TV)
- 1999–2000: Der Clown (TV series)
- 2000: Rosa Roth - Tod eines Bullen (TV episode)
- 2001: Polizeiruf 110 - Bei Klingelzeichen Mord (TV episode)
- 2001: Opferlamm - Zwischen Liebe und Haß (TV)
- 2001: Female 2 Seeks Happy End (TV)
- 2001: The Tunnel
- 2001: Tatort - Kalte Wut (TV episode)
- 2002: Rotlicht - Die Stunde des Jägers (TV)
- 2004: Kleinruppin forever
- 2004: Carola Stern's Double Life (TV)
- 2005: Endless Horizon (TV)
- 2005: Erinnere dich, wenn du kannst! (TV)
- 2005: The News (TV)
- 2006: City for Ransom (TV)
- 2006: The Eagle – Codename: Minos (TV episode)
- 2006: The Eagle – Codename: Ithaka (TV episode)
- 2007: Unter Verdacht – Das Geld anderer Leute (TV episode)
- 2007: Duel at Night (TV)
- 2008: Wenn wir uns begegnen (TV)
- 2008: Eine Nacht im Grandhotel (A Night at the Grand Hotel) (TV)
- 2008: Schattenwelt (Long Shadows)
- 2009: Ein Dorf schweigt (TV)
- 2009: Nachtschicht – Blutige Stadt (TV episode)
- 2009: Hoffnung für Kummerow (TV)
- 2009: Lutter - Mordshunger (TV episode)
- 2010: The Frontier (TV)
- 2010: The Weissensee Saga: A Berlin Love Story (TV mini-series)
- 2010: Morgen musst Du sterben (TV)
- 2011: The Gold Quest: A Journey to Panama (TV)
- 2011: Spreewaldkrimi – Die Tränen der Fische, Regie (TV)
- 2011: Jorinde und Joringel (TV)
- 2012: Visitors
- 2013: Ruby Red

== Donna Leon series ==
As Commissario Guido Brunetti, Kockisch appeared in the following television films based on the crime novels by Donna Leon:

- 2003: ep 5 - Venezianisches Finale (Death at La Fenice) - Director: Sigi Rothemund
- 2003: ep 6 - Feine Freunde (Friends in High Places) - Director: Sigi Rothemund
- 2004: ep 7 - Sanft entschlafen (The Death of Faith – aka Quietly in Their Sleep) - Director: Sigi Rothemund
- 2004: ep 8 - Acqua alta (Acqua alta – aka Death in High Water) - Director: Sigi Rothemund
- 2005: ep 9 - Beweise, dass es böse ist (Doctored Evidence) - Director: Sigi Rothemund
- 2005: ep 10 - Verschwiegene Kanäle (Uniform Justice) - Director: Sigi Rothemund
- 2006: ep 11 - Endstation Venedig (Death in a Strange Country) - Director: Sigi Rothemund
- 2006: ep 12 - Das Gesetz der Lagune (A Sea of Troubles) - Director: Sigi Rothemund
- 2008: ep 13 - Die dunkle Stunde der Serenissima (Wilful Behavior) - Director: Sigi Rothemund
- 2008: ep 14 - Blutige Steine (Blood from a Stone) - Director: Sigi Rothemund
- 2009: ep 15 - Wie durch ein dunkles Glas (Through a Glass, Darkly) - Director: Sigi Rothemund
- 2010: ep 16 - Lasset die Kinder zu mir kommen (Suffer the Little Children) - Director: Sigi Rothemund
- 2011: ep 17 - Das Mädchen seiner Träume (The Girl of His Dreams) - Director: Sigi Rothemund
- 2012: ep 18 - Schöner Schein (About Face) - Director: Sigi Rothemund
- 2013: ep 19 - Auf Treu und Glauben (A Question of Belief) - Director: Sigi Rothemund
