= Hille (Belgium) =

- Hamlet
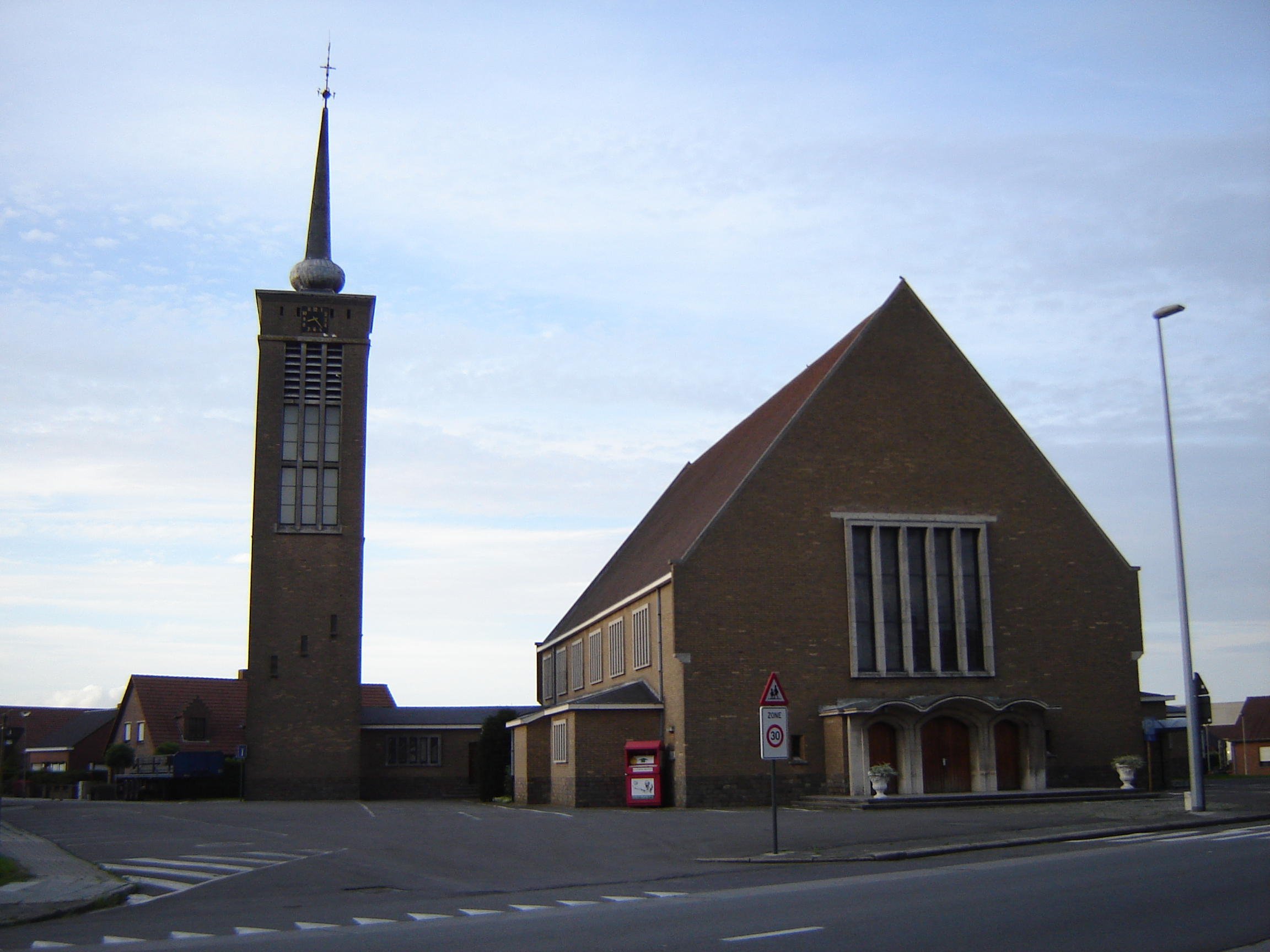
- Interactive map of Hille
- Coordinates: 51.0481°N 3.2258°E
- Country: Belgium
- Region: Flanders
- Province: West Flanders
- Arrondissement: Tielt
- Municipality: Wingene
- Deelgemeente: Zwevezele

Population (2004)
  - Total: 933
- Postal code: 8750

Hille (Pronunciation: [ɦɪllə] ) is a hamlet of the Belgian village of Zwevezele. The hamlet is located one and a half kilometers northeast of the center of Zwevezele.
