= J. Greg Hanson =

American software engineer

1st Chief Information Officer of the United States Senate
- In office June 2003 – January 2008
- Preceded by: Office created

Personal details
- Born: United States
- Education: University of Central Florida; United States Air Force Academy; Air Force Institute of Technology
- Profession: Software engineer

Military service
- Allegiance: United States
- Branch/service: United States Air Force
- Years of service: 1973–1997

J. Greg Hanson is an American computer scientist and software engineer. He previously served as the first Assistant Sergeant at Arms and chief information officer of the United States Senate from June 2003 to January 2008 under Senate Majority Leaders Bill Frist and Harry Reid.

He is now President of Excellence in Business, a consulting firm working with clients on business strategy, strategic planning, large business capture and business development, achieving operational excellence, developing solution architectures, application of high technology, and market analysis.

Hanson has also served as an Adjunct Full Professor, teaching graduate information technology courses for the George Washington University, University of Maryland, and University of Maryland University College (UMUC).

== Career ==
Hanson earned a Bachelor of Science from the United States Air Force Academy, Master of Science in information systems from the Air Force Institute of Technology, and PhD in computer science from the University of Central Florida.

Hanson's initial career was in the United States Air Force, where he retired in 1997 as Chief Software Engineer at USAF Headquarters. There he developed global software policies and led the agency's $345 million Y2K program. He served as Chief Scientist at NATO's Central Region Headquarters, where he managed a $200 million command and control project, directed a four-contractor international consortium, and built NATO's largest local area network. Hanson served as CIO, Under Secretary Defense (Acquisition) for four years. In this position he led a technology development and support division and managed $110 million in contracts and resources.

After retiring from the Air Force, Hanson became chief technology officer at Telos Corporation, where he developed an information assurance spin-off called Xacta, where he was the company's first CTO. He then served as CTO for Universal Systems & Technology (UNITECH), a northern Virginia technology firm.

He then served as the first Chief Information Officer for the United States Senate where he was responsible for planning and operations of a 500-person organization and a $150M budget supporting the Senate.

After serving as the Senate's first CIO, Hanson became Chief Operations Officer (COO) for Criterion Systems, Inc., an IT Solutions and Services company in Virginia, where, as a Direct report to CEO, he had P&L responsibility for one of the fastest growing high technology corporations in the United States. As Chief Operating Officer (COO) Dr. Hanson led three lines of business supporting the United States Department of Defense, Federal Civilian Agencies, and the Intelligence Community (IC). He also served as Chief Technology Officer (CTO) for Criterion's High Performance Computing business.

After serving as Criterion's COO, he became General Manager for NCI Information Systems' Enterprise Solutions Sector. NCI, a publicly traded company (NASDAQ: NCIT, Russell 2000 Index, S&P Small Cap 600) is a leading provider of high-end IT, engineering, logistics, and professional services and solutions to the Federal Government. From January 2016 to July 2019, Dr. Hanson served as COO for Zantech, a Northern VA information technology firm, before retiring to devote full-time to running his firm, Excellence in Business helping companies with operations and pursuing new business. During the past 5 years, he has also served on six Advisory Boards helping companies expand into new markets, grow business, and develop strategic plans and mature business processes.

== Awards ==
2006 University of Central Florida Distinguished Alumnus Award, two Federal Computer Week Fed100 Awards (2006 & 2009), AFFIRM's Award for Leadership in Service Excellence and Management, and AFCEA’s Gold Medal for Engineering and Excellence in Information Technology awards. He has been an active member of the Air Traffic Control Association (ATCA), Armed Forces Communications and Electronics Association (AFCEA), Greater Washington Board of Trade, and Northern Virginia Technology Council.

He also has numerous publications in computer science, industrial engineering, database systems, and information technology and business applications of information technology.
