= San Pietro in Volta =

San Pietro in Volta San Piero in Volta (Venetian)
- Comune
- Comune di San Pietro in Volta
- Location of San Pietro in Volta in Italy San Pietro in Volta (Veneto)
- Coordinates: 45°19′04″N 12°18′53″E
- Country: Italy
- Region: Veneto
- Province: Venice
- Elevation: 2 m (6.6 ft)

Population (16 June 2011)
  - Total: 1,193
- Demonym: sanpierotti
- Time zone: UTC+1 (CET)
  - Summer (DST): UTC+2 (CEST)
- Postal code: 30126
- Dialing code: 041
- Patron saint: San Pietro

San Pietro in Volta (Venetian: San Piero in Volta) is a village in the municipality of Venice, located on the island of Pellestrina, just north of the town of the same name.

It is part of the Lido–Pellestrina district.

== History ==
The settlement lies near the site of the ancient town of Albiola or Pastene, once a notable center that declined in the Middle Ages after its port silted up – giving rise to the modern name Portosecco. According to tradition, on 29 June, 965, the Hungarians, having ravaged the mainland, were defeated here while attempting to attack Venice. To commemorate the victory, a church dedicated to Saint Peter was built about fifty years later, on the saint's feast day. The name in Volta later came into use. One theory suggests it refers to in volata ("in flight"), alluding to the retreat of the Hungarian forces. Another interpretation links it to a bend in the coastline.

== Monuments and Sites of Interest ==
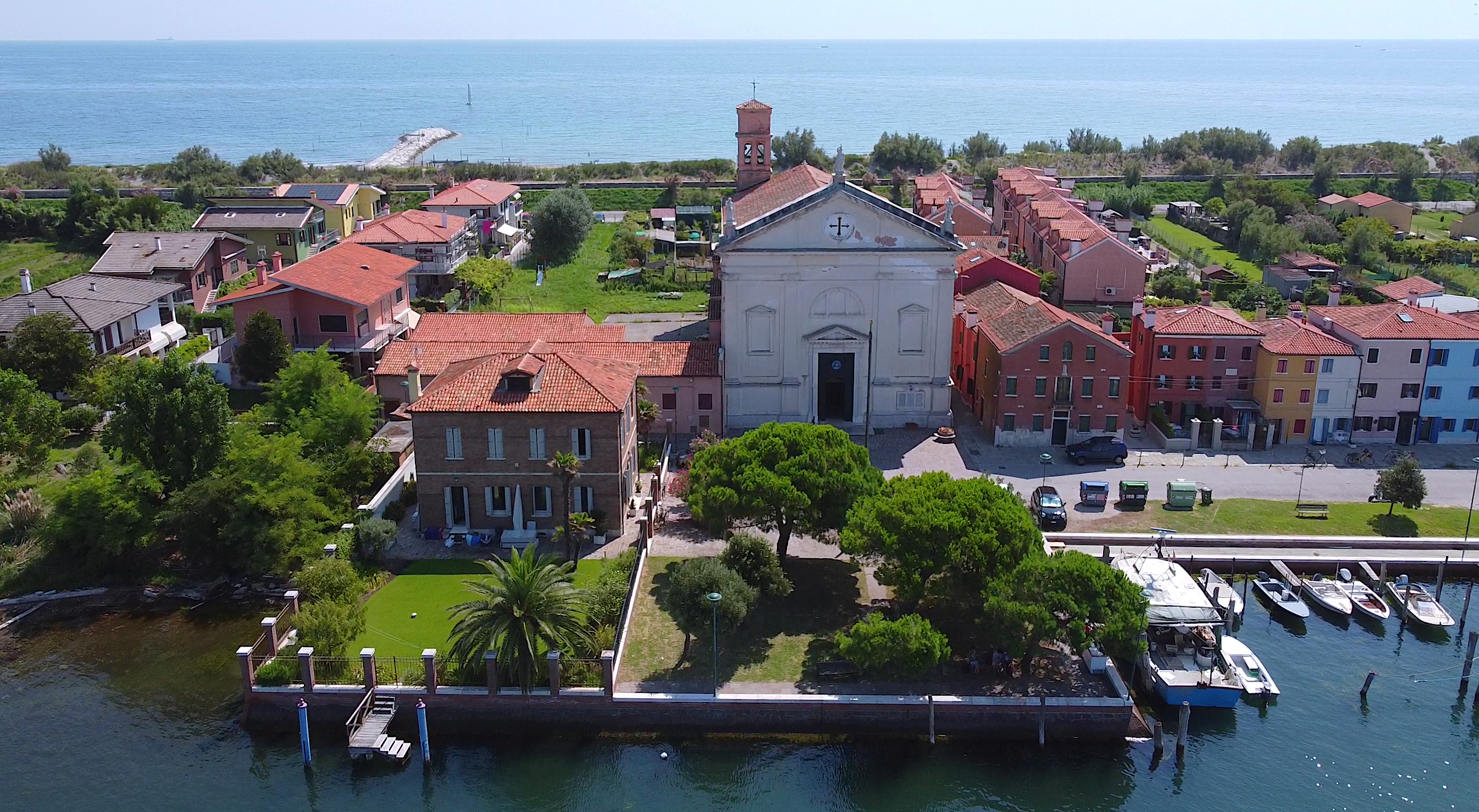
External view of the Church of San Pietro in Volta

The village's Church of Saint Peter, built in 1777, stands on the site of a 17th-century predecessor. Its neoclassical façade and single-nave interior feature a painted ceiling from the 19th century.

In nearby Portosecco, you'll find the 18th century Church of Saint Stephen.

Along the seafront, remnants of German fortifications from World War II are still visible, including platforms that once supported 305 mm artillery guns, among the most powerful of their time.
