= De Verre Ginstecrossers =

== History ==
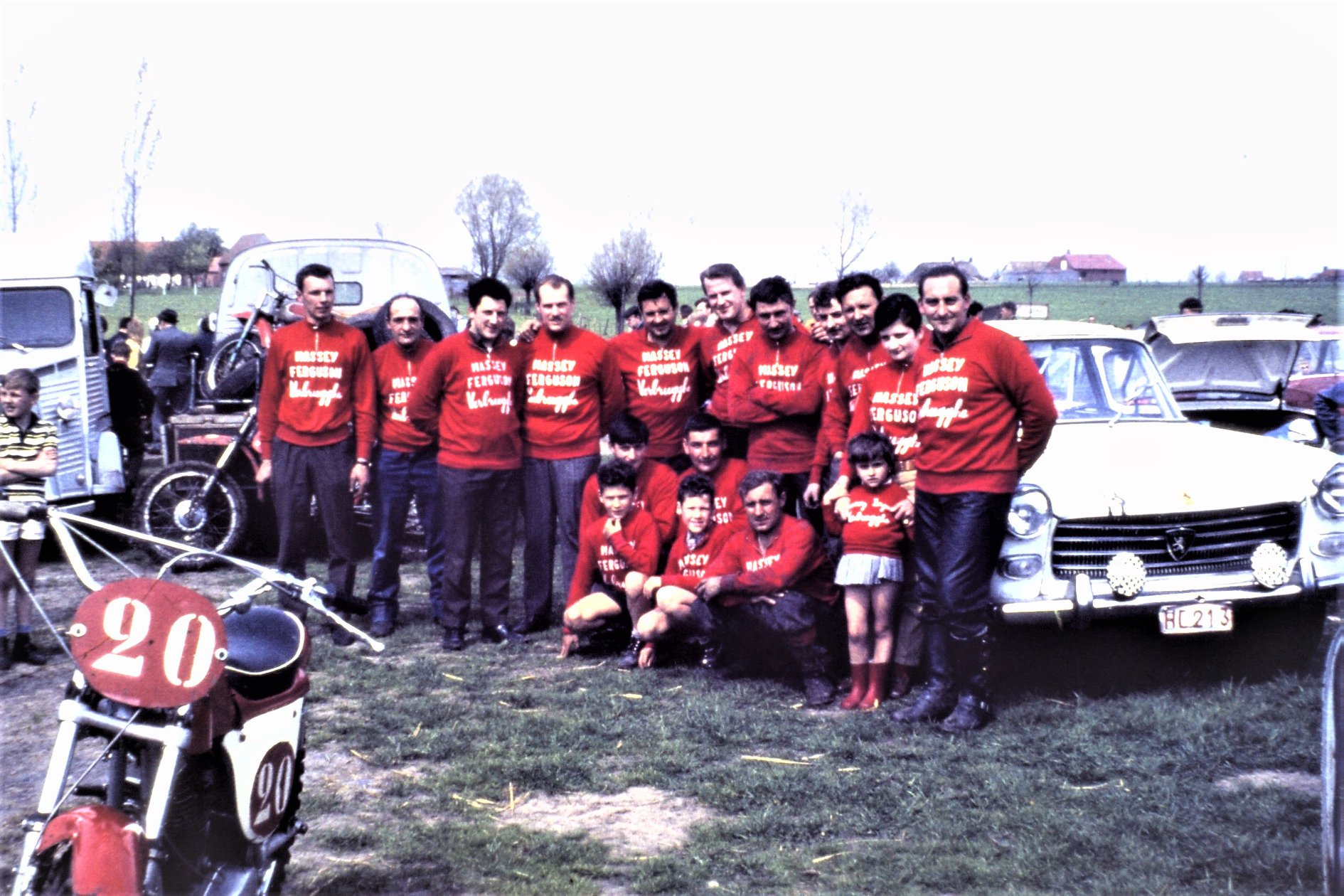
De Verre Ginstecrossers circa 1969

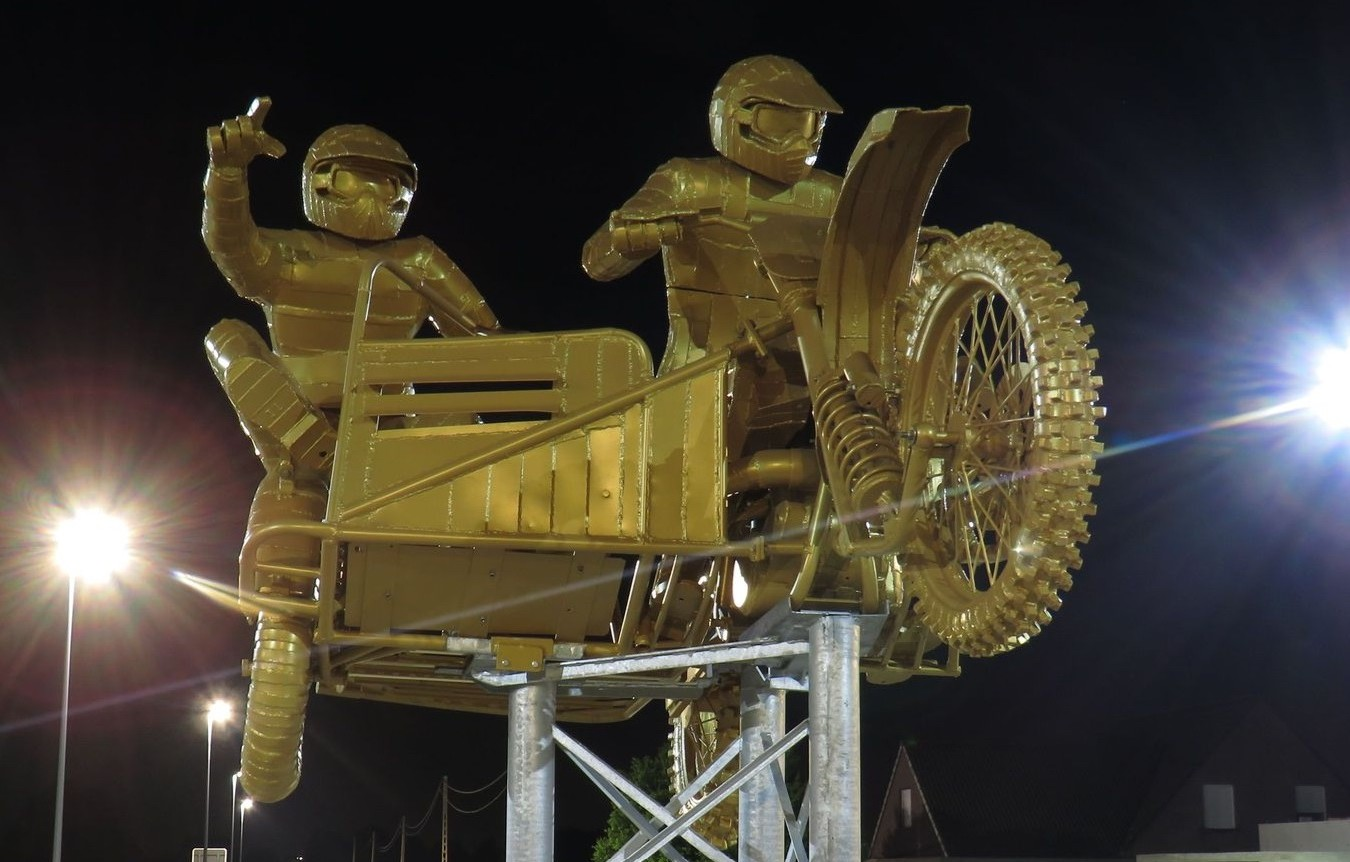
Monument De Ginste

De Verre Ginstecrossers, is a Flemish motocross association from De Ginste, a hamlet in Oostrozebeke, West Flanders. The association was founded in the early 1960s, but the motocross history of the region dates back to the 1950s. Frans, Willy, and Frits Verbrugghe were brothers who started the association, along with Léon Vanluchene. Both the Verbrugghe brothers and Léon Vanluchene have nurtured three generations of motocross riders, some who are still actively competing today and have been a part of De Verre Ginstecrossers throughout the years.

A monument was placed in 2024 to commemorate the history and effect of the association at the roundabout in De Ginste, paying tribute to the motocross culture that De Verre Ginstecrossers brought, as well as to their champions (such as for example 3 times world champion sidecarcross Marvin Vanluchene).

== Events ==
Every year, De Verre Ginstecrossers organize several motocross competitions, with sidecarcross playing a prominent role. The biggest event being the motocross weekend in August, which attracts around 500 riders and 5000 spectators annually. This event also serves as the provincial championship.

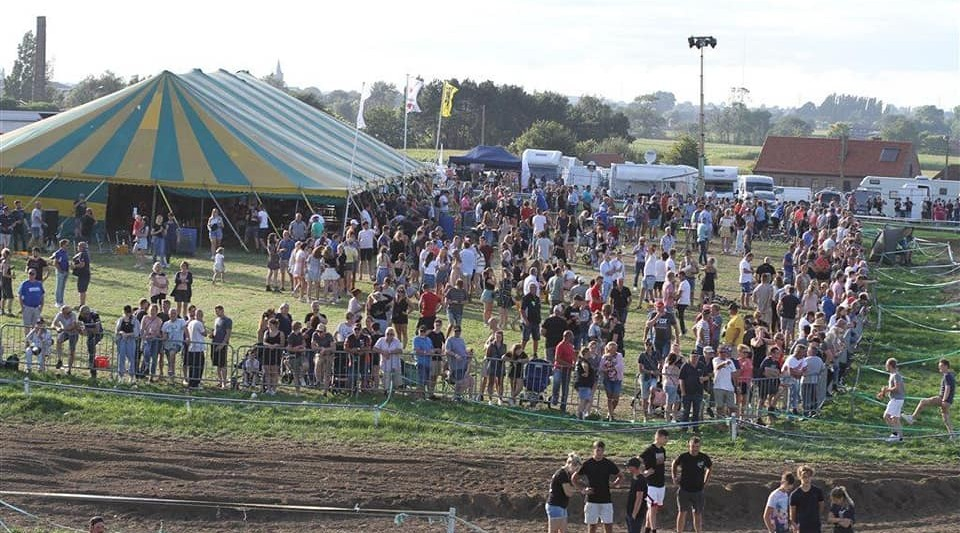
Pause between 2 heats at motocross Oostrozebeke

Other well-known races organized by the association include:

- Recreational sidecar races, where amateur teams without a license get the chance to participate.
- International sidecar races, where teams from different countries compete on the challenging track in Oostrozebeke.

== Members ==
Over the years, many riders and co-pilots (sidecarcross passengers) have represented De Verre Ginstecrossers in different motocross organisations and championships such as the Belgian BMB, MCB (now defunct, became MCLB), VJMO, MCLB, FAM & VMCF organisations, the French FFM federation, The Dutch MON organisation, the German DMV federation, the European IMBA championship and the FIM world championship. Below is an overview of some prominent members and their achievements:

- Arne Dierckens (VJMO, MCLB, FAM, BMB, MON, FIM) – 2x Belgian champion (MCLB Juniors 2013, Beloften 2012), 4 GP-podiums
- Bart Verbrugghe (MCB, MCLB, VMCF, FAM, BMB, FIM) (passenger) – 3x Belgian champion (MCB sidecars 1988, VMCF sidecars A 2009, MCLB sidecars Veterans 2016)
- Ben Vanluchene (MCB, MCLB, VMCF, FAM, BMB, FIM) – 1x Belgian champion (MCLB Internationals 1990)
- Bert Soetaert (MCLB, FIM) – 3x Belgian champion (MCLB sidecars 2016, 2018, 2019)
- Bram Verbrugghe (MCLB, VMCF, FAM, BMB, FFM, DMV, MON, IMBA, FIM) (passenger) – 2x Belgian champion (VMCF sidecars B 2007, VMCF sidecars A 2010)
- Daen Valcke (MCLB, FIM) – 1x Belgian champion (MCLB sidecars B 2022)
- Eduard Soenens (MCLB, BMB, MON, FIM) (passenger) – 3x Belgian champion (MCLB sidecars 2010, 2014, 2018)
- Frank Verbrugghe (MCB, MCLB, FAM)
- Frans Verbrugghe (BMB, MCB)
- Frederic Van Der Voorden (MCLB) (passenger) - 1x Belgian champion (MCLB sidecars B 2025)
- Frits Verbrugghe (BMB, MCB) - 1x Belgian champion (MCB Seniors 1969)
- Gauthier Valcke (MCLB, BMB) (passenger) – 1x Belgian champion (MCLB sidecars B 2017)
- Geert Valcke (MCB, MCLB)
- Jason Van Daele (MCLB, FAM, BMB, FFM, MON, FIM) – 1x Belgian champion (BMB sidecars 2017), 1 GP-podium, first person to backflip a sidecar
- Joey Valcke (MCLB, FAM, BMB, MON, FIM) (passenger) – 3x Belgian champion (MCLB sidecars 2022, 2023, 2025)
- John Verbrugghe (MCB) - 1x Belgian champion (MCB Juniors 500cc 1989)
- Kenneth Dierckens (VJMO, MCLB, FAM, BMB, FIM) – 5x Belgian champion (MCLB sidecars B 2009, MCLB sidecars A 2011, 2012, 2013, 2015)
- Kurt Dierckens (MCB)
- Léon Vanluchene (BMB, MCB) – 1x Belgian champion (MCB Juniors 1969)
- Marc Verbrugghe (MCB, MCLB, FAM) – 2x Belgian champion (MCLB sidecars A 2010, 2011)
- Mathieu Verbrugghe (VJMO, MCLB)
- Marvin Vanluchene (VJMO, MCLB, VMCF, BMB, FFM, MON, FIM) – 5x Belgian champion (VMCF sidecars A 2011, VMCF sidecars B 2010, MCLB sidecars 2014, BMB Sidecars 2018, 2019), 26 GP-podiums, 3x FIM World Champion
- Olivier Valcke (MCLB, FAM, BMB, FFM, MON, FIM) (passenger/pilot) – 2x Belgian champion (MCLB sidecars A 2011, MCLB Sidecars B 2017)
- Tom Verbrugghe (MCLB, VMCF, BMB, FFM, MON, IMBA, FIM) (passenger) – 1x Belgian champion (MCLB sidecars B 2022)
- Willy Verbrugghe (BMB, MCB) – 1x Belgian champion (BMB Juniors 1962)
- Wim Verbrugghe (MCB, MCLB, FAM) – 1x Belgian champion (MCB sidecars 1988)
- Yens Delmotte (MCLB, FAM, BMB, FFM, MON, FIM) – 4x Belgian champion (MCLB Sidecars B 2010, MCLB sidecars A 2022, 2023)
