= Stolberg (TV series) =

German detective television series

- Genre: Detective fiction; police procedural
- Directed by: Matti Geschonneck; Filippos Tsitos; Peter Keglevic
- Starring: Rudolf Kowalski
- Theme music composer: Nikolaus Glowna; Siggi Mueller
- Country of origin: Germany
- Original language: German
- No. of seasons: 8
- No. of episodes: 50

Production
- Camera setup: Hannes Hubach
- Running time: 60 minutes
- Production company: Network Movie

Original release
- Network: ZDF
- Release: 27 October 2006 – 2 March 2013

Stolberg is a German detective television series which ran from 2006 until 2013 on ZDF, starring Düsseldorf chief inspector Martin Stolberg (Rudolf Kowalski). The series is more serious and less flashy than other contemporary German detective series.

== Cast and characters ==
- Rudolf Kowalski as chief inspector
- Victoria Mayer as detective
- Aurel Manthei as detective
- Eva Scheurer as forensic investigator
- Annett Renneberg as detective
- Wanja Mues as detective
- Jasmin Schwiers as detective
