= Zwevezele =

- Deelgemeente
- Coordinates: 51°02′11″N 3°12′45″E
- Country: Belgium
- Region: Flanders
- Province: West Flanders
- Arrondissement: Tielt
- Municipality: Wingene

Area
  - Total: 52.46 km^{2} (20.25 sq mi)

Population (1 January 2007)
  - Total: 5,378
- Postal code: 8750
- Municipalities fusion: 1977

Zwevezele (Pronunciation: [zweːvəzeːlə] ) is a town in the Belgian province of West Flanders. It has been part of the Wingene municipality since 1 January 1977. Zwevezele has over 5,000 inhabitants. Between Zwevezele and Wingene there is a hamlet called Hille, with its Saint Joseph Parish. The hamlet has since grown with Zwevezele itself.

== History ==
The name Sweveseele is probably derived from the root, the Sueves, which was already mentioned by Julius Caesar. In 1949. the name Sweveseele changed officially in Zwevezele. Although there is no official source to prove this, as the name "Zwevezele" was used in birth records stemming back to the 1700s. In fact, a map dating from the 1750, has the spelling "zwevefeele". A map from 1630 has the spelling "Zwevele". It is safe to say that the origin of the name came from Sweveseele, which the root was Sueves. This city has 1000 years of history.

During the First World War, several bomb attacks were committed by the Germans in Zwevezele, in which dozens of civilians died. At the Hille was a German airfield.

During the Second World War, Zwevezele was occupied again by the Germans. The first Polish armored division had landed on the beaches of Normandy in June 1944. Under the capable leadership of General Maczek they advanced via Ypres, Roeselare to reach Zwevezele. The church was taken without bloodshed. After all, the Germans had fled to Ruiselede via Wingene. On this retreat they were heavily attacked by a group of 'Typhoon' aircraft in which there were many deaths among the German soldiers. To commemorate the Zwevezeel victims, a monument for the fallen soldiers is on the Markt. There is also a Polish Sherman tank and a Canadian Halifax to honor the foreign liberators.

== Sport and recreation ==
K.S.K. Voorwaarts Zwevezele is the premier football club in Zwevezele and played in the national divisions between 2018 and 2022. They reached the Belgian Second Amateur Division in 2019 after their fifth promotion in six seasons, before withdrawing from the Belgian national divisions after not renewing their license in 2022. The women's team play in the Belgian Women's First Division, the second tier of Belgian women's football.

== Sights ==
- The Sint-Aldegondis Church is located in the village center. The church has an eight-sided gothic 15th-century lantern tower and a choir in 1768. The five-aisled nave from the 15th century was demolished in 1964 and rebuilt in a modern style.
- The Castle Park in Zwevezele, with the coach house and bathhouse. The castle itself was demolished.
- The statue of the Carnavalvierders made by Jef Claerhout in honor of the annual event 'Carnaval Zwevezele' since 1968, on the Market Square
- War memorial commemorating the victims of the First World War and the Second World War, on the corner of Bruggestraat and Marktplein.
- The restored old town hall of Zwevezele on the Market Square.
- Munkebossen, north of the Hille, including Castle Munkegoed, and Castle Raepenburg and Castle Lakenbossen (Red Castle) just outside the border of Zwevezele.

== Gallery ==
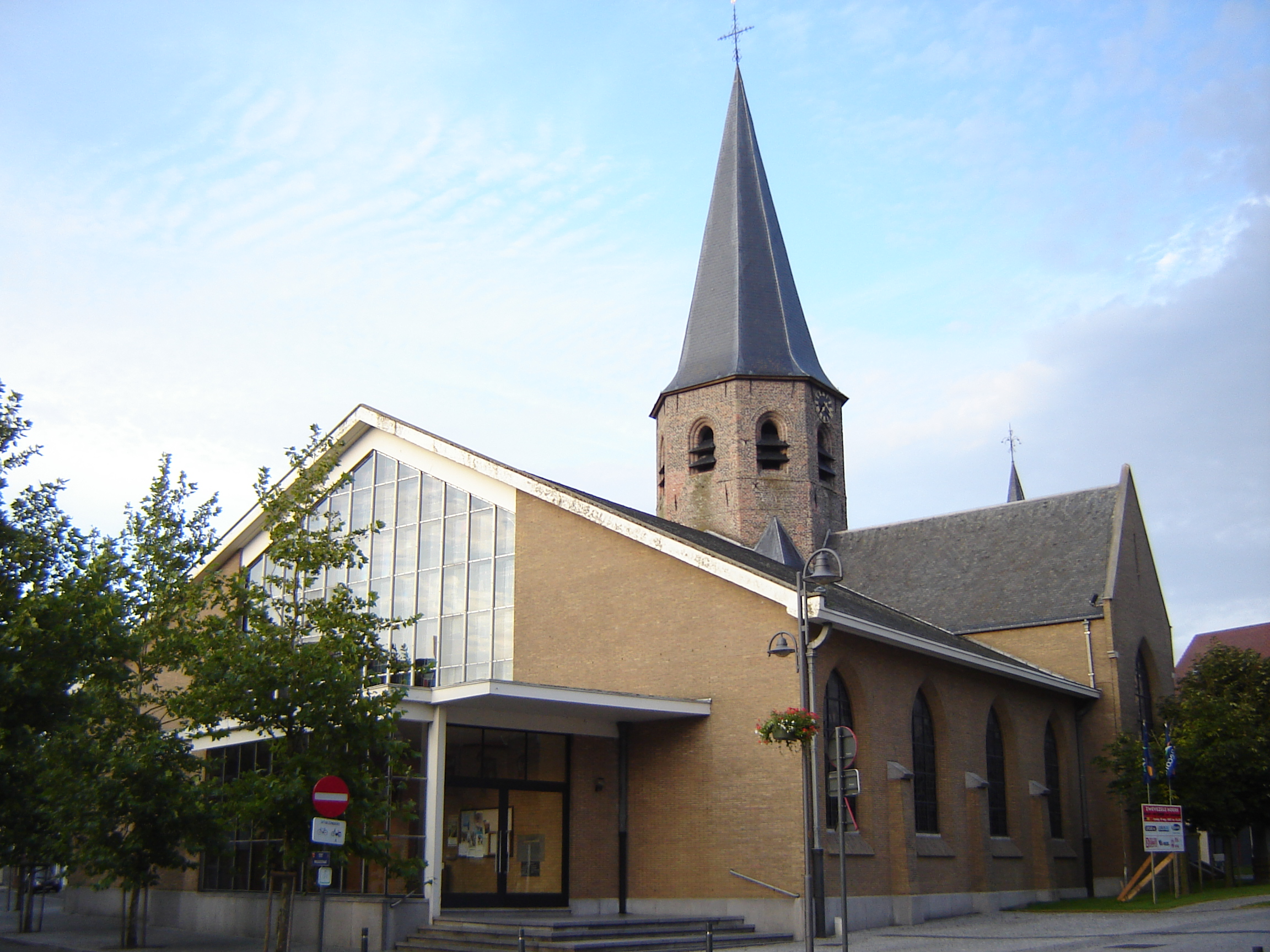
Saint Aldegonde Church

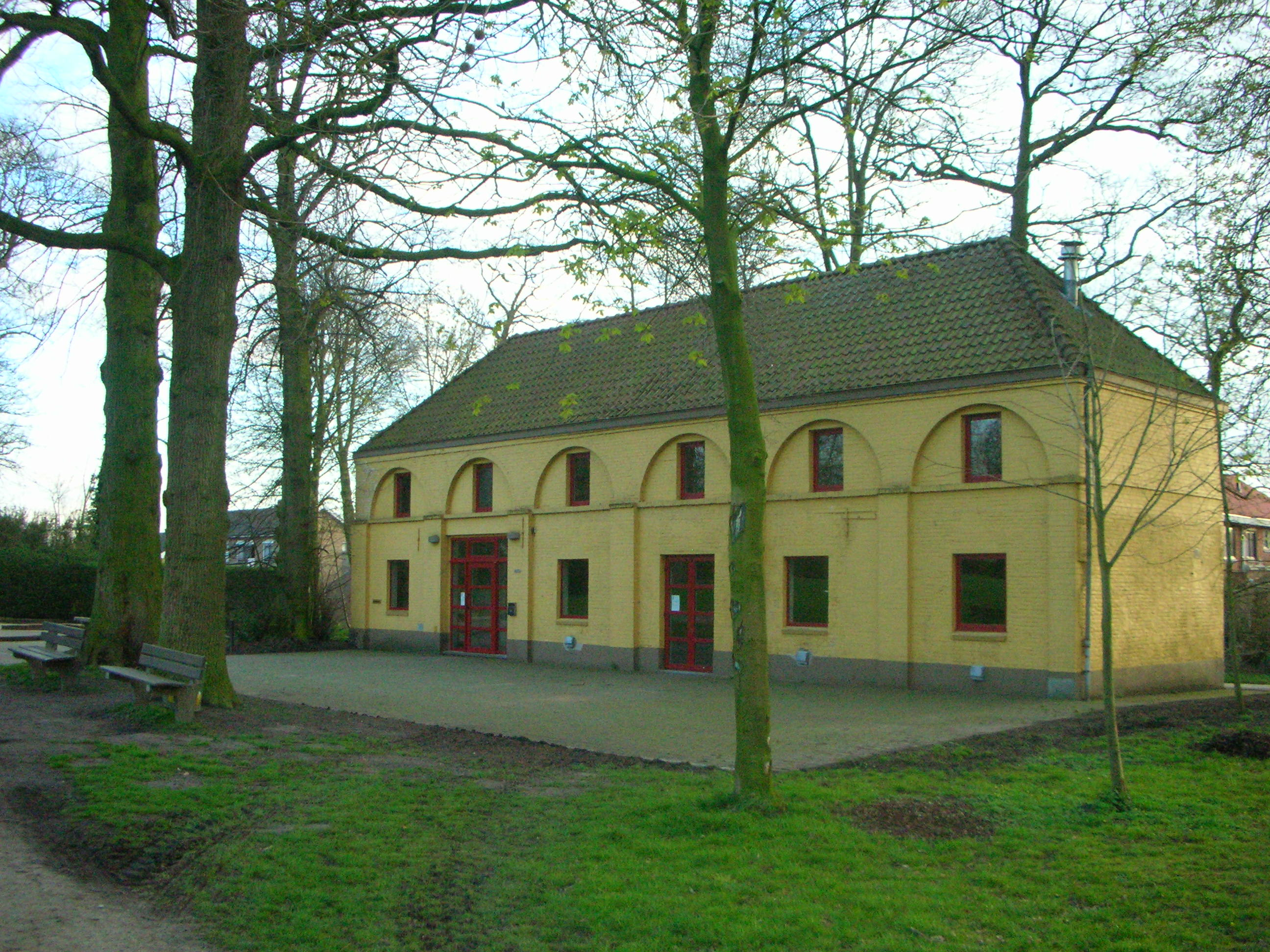
Restored coach house of the former castle of Zwevezele

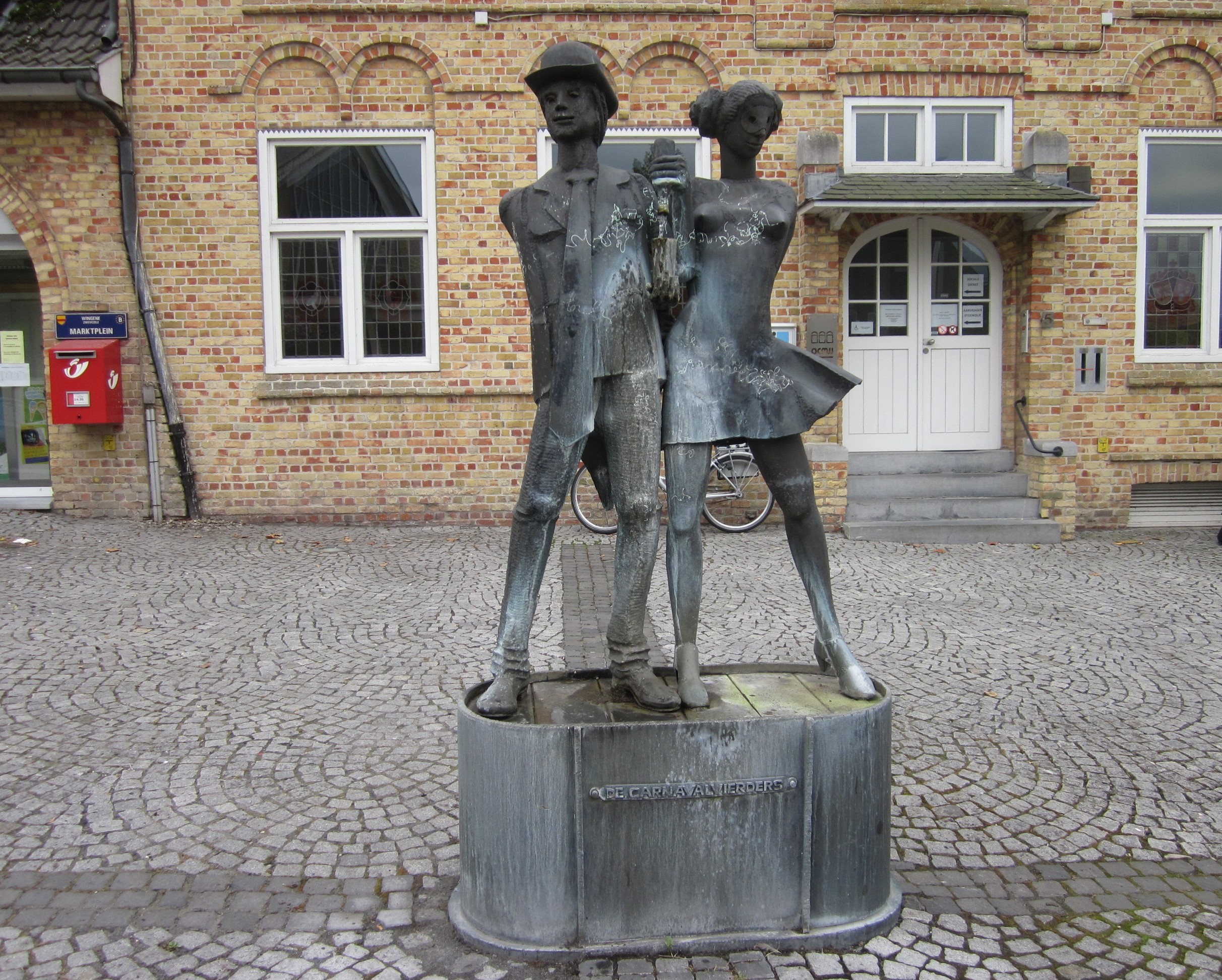
Statue 'Carnavalvierders' (Carnaval celebrators)

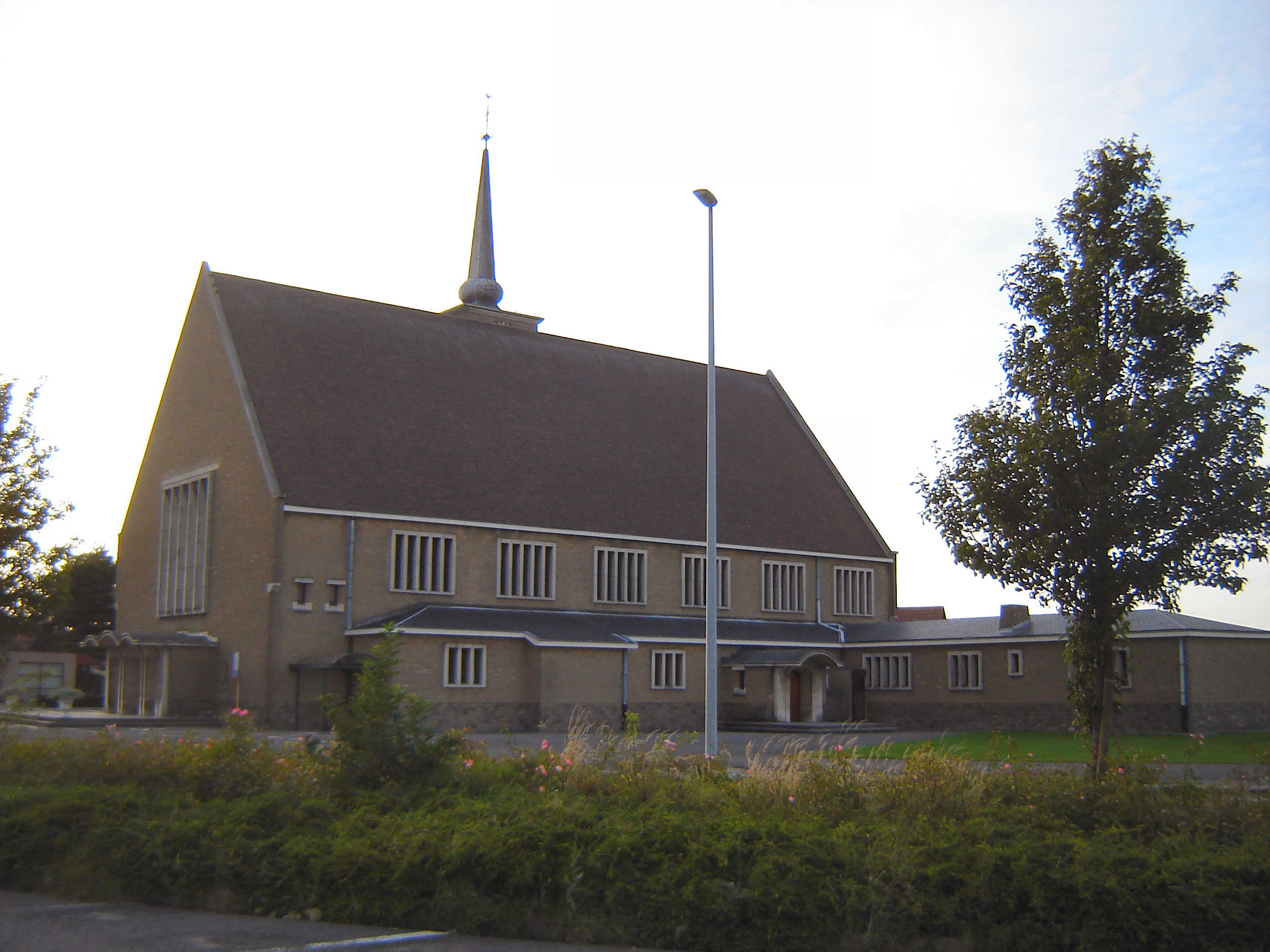
Saint Joseph Church in Hille
