= Walter Ratliff =

Academic background
- Education: University of New Mexico (BA); Wheaton College (MA); University of Maryland Global Campus (MBA); Georgetown University (MA, DLS)

Academic work
- Discipline: Religious studies Journalism
- Institutions: Associated Press; University of Maryland

Walter Ratliff is an American journalist and religious studies scholar based at the Associated Press in Washington, D.C.

== Education ==
Ratliff earned a Bachelor of Arts degree in journalism and religious studies from the University of New Mexico, a Master of Arts in communication from Wheaton College, a Master of Business Administration from University of Maryland Global Campus, and a Master of Arts in Islam and Muslim–Christian relations and Doctor of Liberal Studies in religion and social movements from Georgetown University.

== Career ==
He began his broadcasting career at KLYT in Albuquerque, New Mexico, and his journalism career at KOAT-TV.

Ratliff has worked as a documentary consultant and researcher for German television, including ZDF and Arte. At the Associated Press, he produced a series of documentary reports on Islam in Egypt’s Muslim Brotherhood, Great Britain’s immigrant community, and America’s prisons. He also won a "Beat of the Week" award for his work on AP's Pope John Paul II multimedia profile.

In 2001, Ratliff pioneered the use of online video for the Associated Press in Washington, DC, becoming the first to produce reports from the company's Broadcast News Center. His online AP reports were regularly featured on the landing page of major news organizations, including the New York Times, Washington Post, USA Today and Yahoo News. Prior to joining AP, he covered Capitol Hill for Christianity Today, produced a documentary on Muslim-Christian violence in Northern Nigeria, and covered the funeral of executed human rights leader Ken Saro-Wiwa in the Niger Delta region. He also worked closely with Arabs, Israelis and Europeans delivering news from the United States.

In 2024, Ratliff won the Religion Communicators Council's highest honor, the Wilbur Award, with AP Reporter Allen Breed for a report on guns in American churches, as well as an additional Award of Excellence from the organization for another report that year. In 2023, he won an Award of Merit from the RCC for the Sacred Rivers episode of the weekly AP Religion Roundup audio feature. In 2016 and 2018, he was awarded first place for national network news religion reporting by the Religion News Association. In 2011, he won a nonfiction gold medal in the Reader's Favorite book awards for Pilgrims on the Silk Road: A Muslim-Christian Encounter in Khiva. He was also the producer/director of the documentary, Through the Desert Goes Our Journey: The Mennonite Trek to Khiva, for which he won an Emmy Award from the Heartland chapter of the NATAS. His most recent book is Between Faith and Power: Religious Freedom as Dynamic Engagement. Since 2011, Ratliff has been an adjunct professor at the University of Maryland Global Campus.
