= Death in a Strange Country =

1993 novel by Donna Leon

- Author: Donna Leon
- Language: English
- Series: Guido Brunetti, #2
- Genre: crime fiction, mystery
- Publisher: HarperCollins (US); Chapmans (UK)
- Publication date: 1993
- Publication place: United States
- Media type: Print (Hardback & Paperback)
- ISBN: 9780143115885
- Preceded by: Death at La Fenice
- Followed by: The Anonymous Venetian

Death in a Strange Country (1993) is the second novel in Donna Leon's Commissario Brunetti mysteries set in Venice and the sequel to Death at La Fenice (1992).

== Plot summary ==
Early one morning Brunetti is confronted with the body of a young American serviceman fished out of a fetid Venetian canal. All clues point to a mugging, but robbery seems too convenient a motive. Then something incriminating is found in the dead man's flat, and Brunetti becomes convinced that somebody is taking great pains to provide an easy solution to the crime. When he uncovers collusion between U.S. bases abroad and international business interests involved in toxic waste disposal, he exposes the sinister face of the military-industrial complex. Add to this the corruption of Italian politics, and the reader sees Brunetti rendered helpless in the face of evil. Only a vengeful Sicilian mother can bring a bit of justice to the world Leon has created.

== Adaptations ==
Death in a Strange Country was adapted for television in 2006 by Teamworx Produktion GmbH as Endstation Venedig, part of its Commissario Brunetti Mysteries series, starring Uwe Kockisch as Guido Brunetti.
