= Wingene =

- Municipality
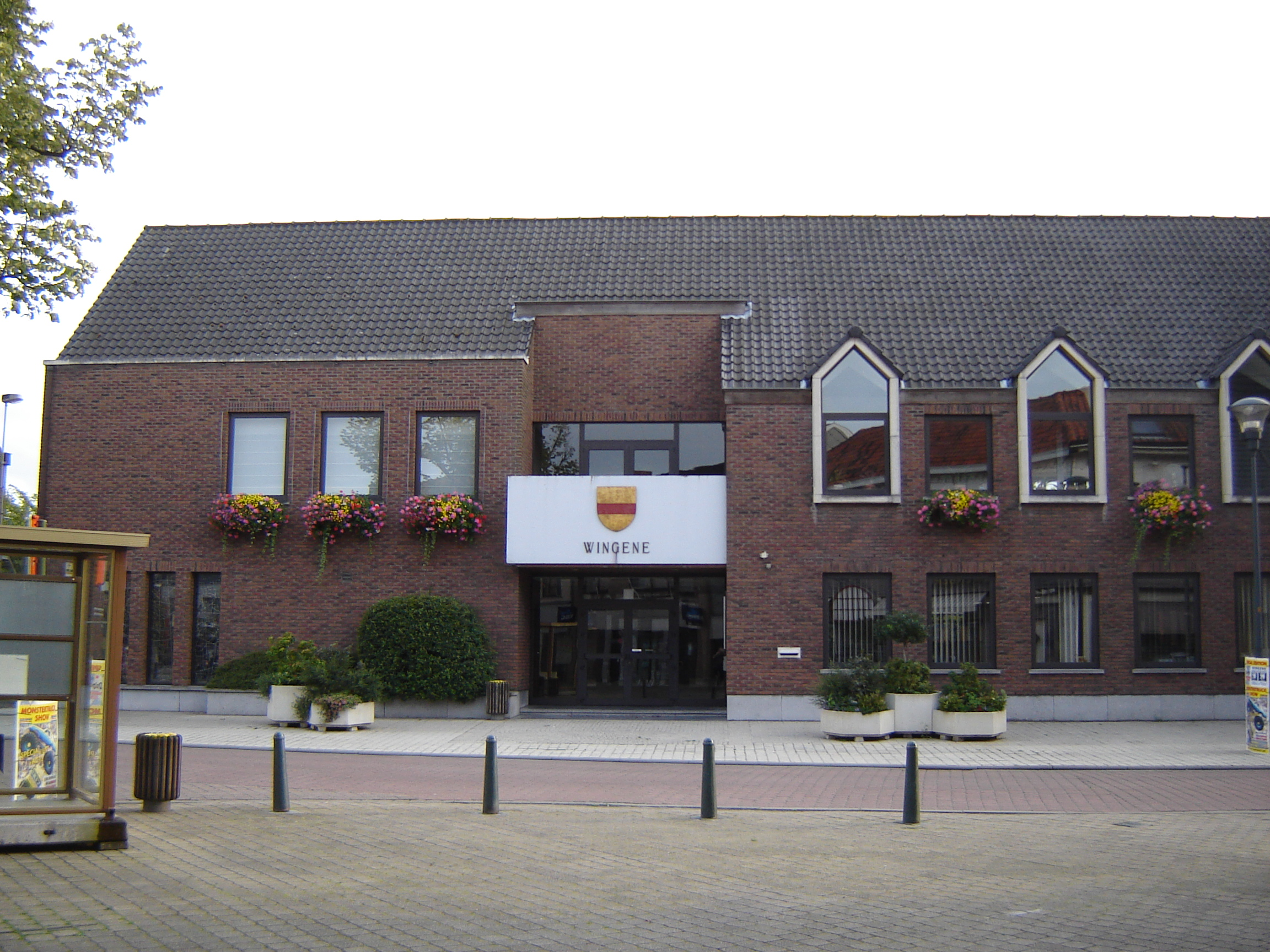
- Wingene town hall

- Flag Coat of arms

- Location of Wingene in West Flanders
- Interactive map of Wingene
- Location in Belgium
- Coordinates: 51°03′N 03°16′E
- Country: Belgium
- Community: Flemish Community
- Region: Flemish Region
- Province: West Flanders
- Arrondissement: Tielt

Government
  - Mayor: Lieven Huys (CD&V)
  - Governing party: CD&V

Population (2018-01-01)
  - Total: 14,243
- Postal codes: 8750
- NIS code: 37018
- Area codes: 051
- Website: www.wingene.be

Wingene (Dutch pronunciation: [ˈʋɪŋənə]; West Flemish: Wiengne; historically: Wynghene) is a municipality located in the Belgian province of West Flanders. The municipality comprises the towns of Wingene proper and Zwevezele. On December 1, 2019, Wingene had a total population of 14,398. The total area is 68.42 km^{2} which gives a population density of 192 inhabitants per km^{2}.

== Gallery ==
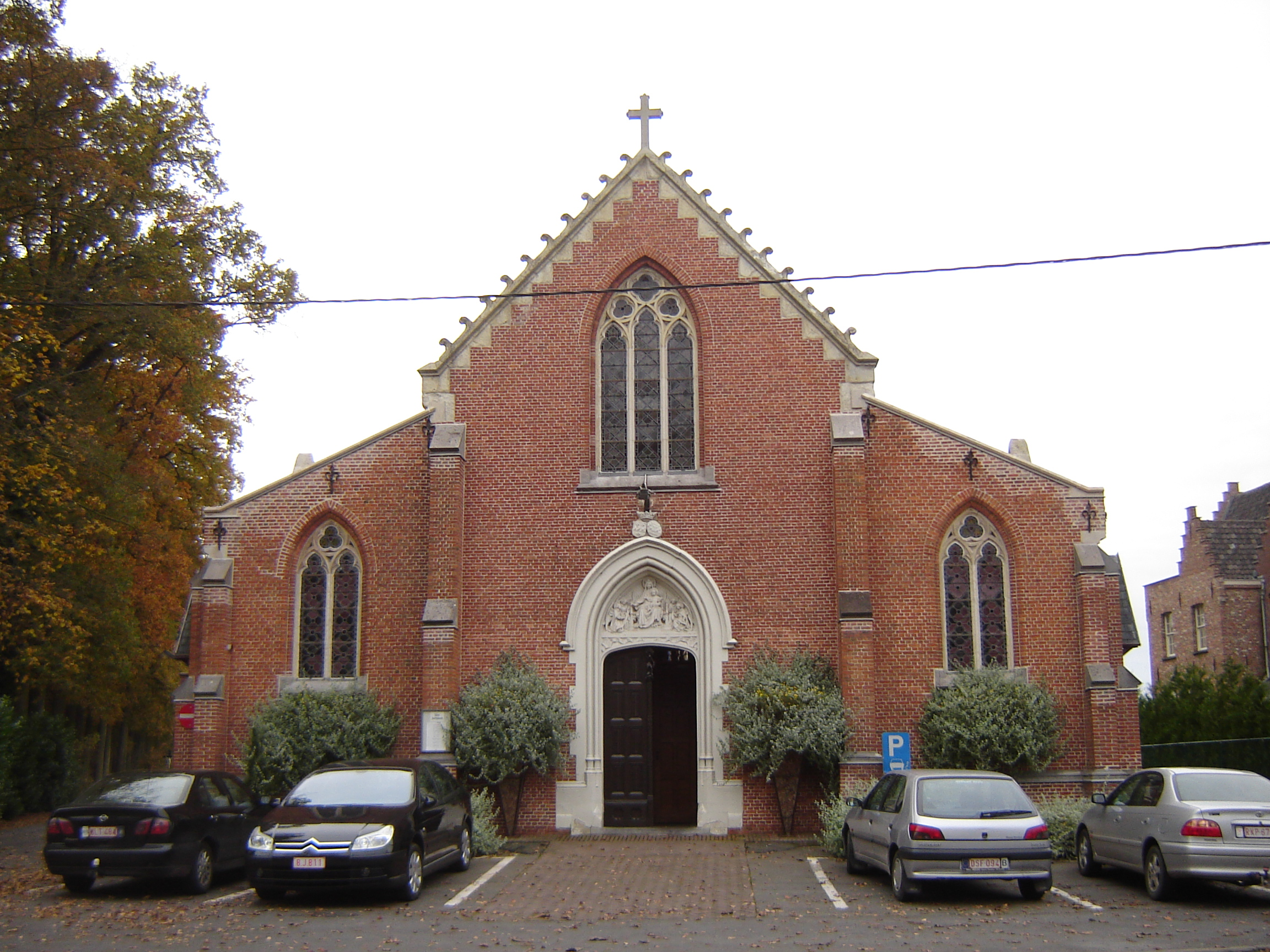
Saint George's church, Wildenburg, Wingene

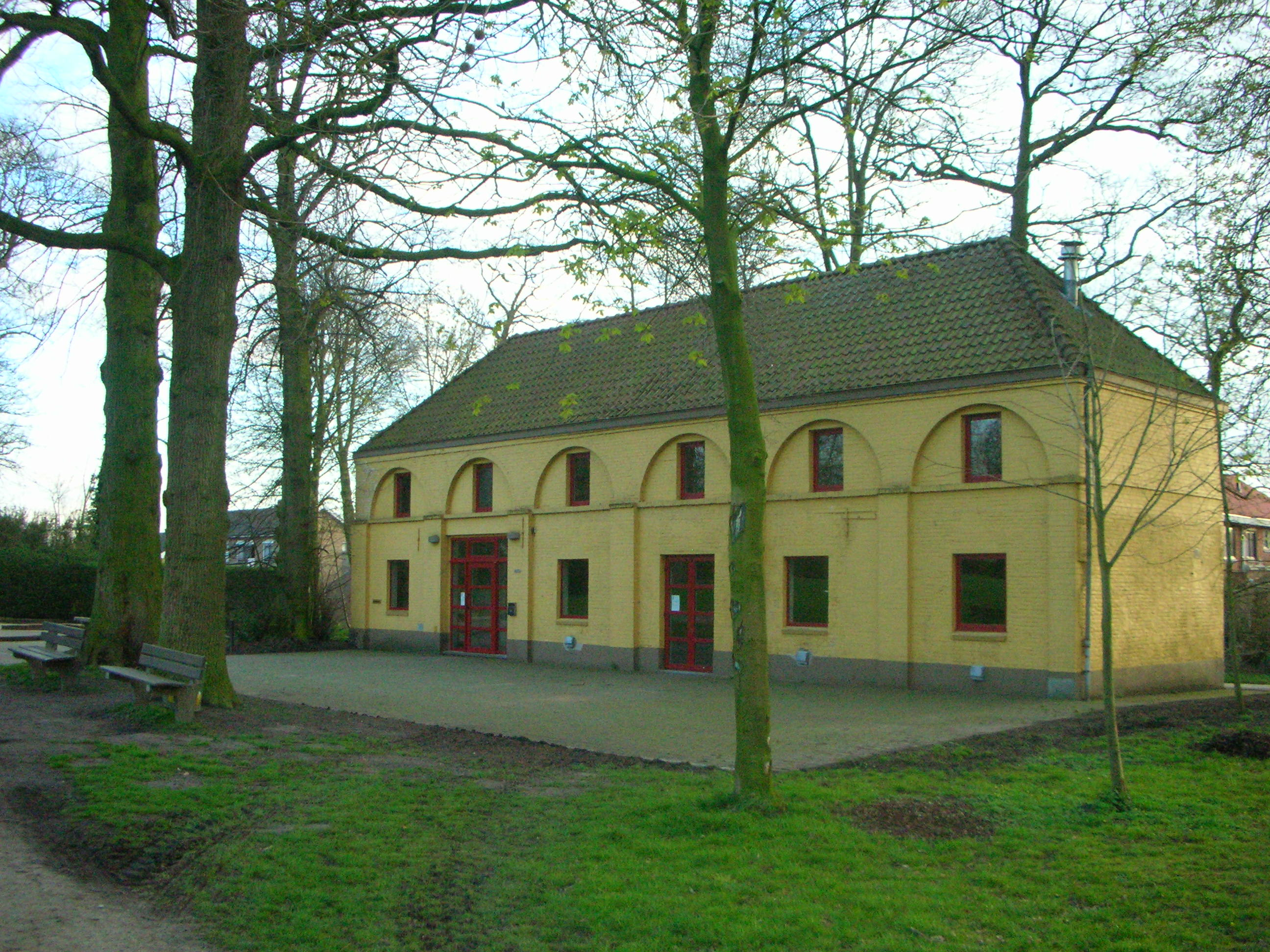
Restored coach house of the former castle of Zwevezele
