= Guido Brunetti novels =

Fictional Venetian detective

Guido Brunetti
- First appearance: Death at La Fenice
- Created by: Donna Leon
- Portrayed by: Joachim Król; Uwe Kockisch; Julian Rhind-Tutt

In-universe information
- Gender: Male
- Title: Commissario
- Occupation: Police officer
- Spouse: Paola Falier
- Children: Raffaele and Chiara
- Nationality: Italian

Guido Brunetti is a fictional Italian detective, created by Swiss/American writer Donna Leon. He is a commissario (detective superintendent) in the Italian State Police, stationed in Venice and a native of that city. Brunetti is the protagonist of (as of 2024) 33 novels: He also appears in a German TV film series based on these novels.

== Depiction ==
Brunetti is described by Leon in her first novel, Death at La Fenice, as "a surprisingly neat man, tie carefully knotted, hair shorter than was the fashion; even his ears lay close to his head, as if reluctant to call attention to themselves. His clothing marked him as Italian. The cadence of his speech announced he was Venetian. His eyes were all policeman." (Note: Death at La Fenice p7) He is portrayed as honest, intelligent, and diligent in his work. He is happily married to Paola, a university lecturer, and has two children, Raffaele (16) and Chiara (13). He is well-educated (with the title dottore), having read classics at university, (Note: Death at La Fenice p34) and speaks English well, from working in the US for a period. (Note: Death in a Strange Country p54) He is by turns philosophical, intelligent, and compassionate, but also pragmatic, with "native skills of subterfuge, trickery and deceit". Arminta Wallace of the Irish Times has suggested that Brunetti is the antithesis of a crime-fiction stereotype; unlike the typical "shambolic, hard-drinking, over-worked policeman", he is "presentable and well-read. He gets home for dinner..." and he "seems to enjoy the company of his wife Paola and their kids".

Brunetti is assisted by a Detective Sergeant (later Inspector), Lorenzo Vianello, and by the station secretary, Elettra Zorzi, though he has a difficult relationship with his superior, Vice-Questore Giuseppe Patta.

== List of characters ==
Some recurring characters from the Brunetti novels.

=== Colleagues ===
- Lorenzo Vianello, introduced in the second novel, Death in a Strange Country, is a detective sergeant and Brunetti's usual assistant. He is older than Brunetti, (Note: The Anonymous Venetian p110) stolid and dependable. Later in the series he is promoted to Ispettore (detective inspector)
- Elettra Zorzi (referred to as "signorina Elettra") is the Questura secretary. An able and intelligent woman, she was introduced in the third novel, The Anonymous Venetian, and quickly became indispensable to the running of the department. She readily assists Brunetti through her computer skills and range of contacts; he describes her as "a woman of endless and instinctive deceit". (Note: A Question of Belief p17)
- Giuseppe Patta, the station's Vice-Questore, is Sicilian, a vain, bombastic, and (by turns) idle or dictatorial man. Brunetti has an awkward relationship with him, and this opinion is shared by the others; in Fatal Remedies we see signorina Elettra running a surreptitious game of Bingo, based on Patta's use of jargon during staff briefings (Note: Acqua Alta p)
- Ettore Rizzardi, the Medical Examiner, a skilled and conscientious physician.
- Claudia Griffoni, a commissario, introduced in the 18th novel, About Face, and described as a "willowy blond."

=== Family ===
- Paola Falier, Brunetti's wife, a university lecturer in English Literature (like Donna Leon herself)
- Raffaele ("Raffi") their son
- Chiara, their daughter
- Conte Orazio Falier, Brunetti's father-in-law, Paola's father
- Contessa Donatella Falier, Brunetti's mother-in-law, Paola's mother

== Novels ==
Commissario Brunetti appears in the following novels.

1. Death at La Fenice (1992)
2. Death in a Strange Country (1993)
3. The Anonymous Venetian (1994) a.k.a. Dressed for Death
4. A Venetian Reckoning (1995) a.k.a. Death and Judgment
5. Acqua Alta (1996) a.k.a. Death in High Water
6. The Death of Faith (1997) a.k.a. Quietly in Their Sleep
7. A Noble Radiance (1997)
8. Fatal Remedies (1999)
9. Friends in High Places (2000)
10. A Sea of Troubles (2001)
11. Wilful Behaviour (2002)
12. Uniform Justice (2003)
13. Doctored Evidence (2004)
14. Blood from a Stone (2005)
15. Through a Glass, Darkly (2006)
16. Suffer the Little Children (2007)
17. The Girl of His Dreams (2008)
18. About Face (2009)
19. A Question of Belief (2010)
20. Drawing Conclusions (2011)
21. Beastly Things (2012)
22. The Golden Egg (2013)
23. By Its Cover (2014) - Someone is cutting pages out of precious rare library books, and Brunetti investigates. The obvious culprit has disappeared. Then an ex-priest who was in the library at the same time is murdered.
24. Falling in Love (2015) - Diva Flavia Petrelli is back, performing as Tosca. Someone has been sending her extravagant flowers and a valuable necklace. Then a singer whom Flavia complimented is pushed down some stairs, and her landlord, an ex-boyfriend, is stabbed. Can Brunetti protect Flavia from this violent stalker?
25. The Waters of Eternal Youth (2016) – Brain-damaged granddaughter.
26. Earthly Remains (2017) – Island vacation.
27. The Temptation of Forgiveness (2018) - Accountant whistleblower.
28. Unto Us a Son Is Given (2019) - Old man wants to adopt.
29. Trace Elements (2020) - A woman in hospice reaches out to the Venice police regarding the motorcycle death of her husband, an employee at an environmental water testing company. Commissario Brunetti along with Commissario Claudia Griffoni bring their complementary investigatory skills to tackle this case.
30. Transient Desires (2021) – Joyriding boating accident.
31. Give Unto Others (2022) – Set in the COVID pandemic, this tale starts with Guido doing a favor for a long-ago acquaintance, which leads to discoveries of various forms of tax fraud and deceit, and has Brunetti questioning his motives.
32. So Shall You Reap (2023) - How the murder of a peaceful Sri Lankan brings back memories of Italy's Lead Years (1970–1988).
33. A Refiner's Fire (2024) - Problems with the "baby gangs" of Venice.

== Adaptations ==
=== Television ===
Trebitsch Productions has adapted the first 26 Commissario Brunetti novels for German television for ARD's Degeto Film division, although the characters and plot details in the adaptions differ from those in the source material. Until episode 13, the films didn't even come out in the same order as the books. Joachim Król played Brunetti from 2000 to 2002, with Uwe Kockisch taking over from 2003 to 2019. Although there are more books, the series is not continued after 26 episodes.

In December 2024, it was announced that a new television adaptation will be produced by 20th Television, with Julian Fellowes serving as executive producer and lead writer.

=== Radio ===
Julian Rhind-Tutt voiced Brunetti in two-part audio adaptations of Death at La Fenice and Acqua Alta for BBC Radio 4.
