= Hille Sarapuu =

Estonian speed skater, cyclist and motorcycle rider (born 1937)

Hille Sarapuu (since 1970 Bachmann; born 12 December 1937) is an Estonian speed skater, cyclist and motorcycle rider.

== Biography ==
Born 12 December 1937, in Tallinn, Sarapuu began her skating career in 1952. She is multiple-time Estonian champion in different speed skating disciplines.

In 1954, Sarapuu won two silver medals at Estonian championships in cycling.

Since 1956, Sarapuu started her career in motocross, coached by Virve Lauri. From 1962 to 1965, she won four medals at Soviet Union motocross championships.

In 1961, Sarapuu played a role in the film Dangerous Curves. On 25 July 1968, while a member of the Soviet delegation to the International Motorsport Federation returning home from Vienna, Sarapuu defected at an Austrian police station. She refused to meet with representatives of the Soviet Union. She soon moved on to the United States, where she has made a permanent home. In the United States, she began working as a hairdresser and now lives in Baltimore.
