= Death at La Fenice =

1992 novel by Donna Leon

- 1st US edition
- Author: Donna Leon
- Language: English
- Series: Guido Brunetti, #1
- Genre: crime fiction, mystery
- Publisher: HarperCollins (US); Arrow (UK)
- Publication date: 1992
- Publication place: United States
- Media type: Print (Hardback & Paperback)
- ISBN: 0-09-946936-7
- OCLC: 53820887
- Followed by: Death in a Strange Country

Death at La Fenice (1992), the first novel by American academic and crime-writer Donna Leon, is the first of the internationally best-selling Commissario Brunetti mystery series, set in Venice, Italy. The novel won the Japanese Suntory prize, and its sequel is Death in a Strange Country (1993).

== Plot ==
A world-famous German opera conductor has died at La Fenice, and Commissario (Detective) Guido Brunetti pursues what appears to be a murder investigation without leads.

== Inspiration ==
Leon, who completed a doctorate in Indiana, specialising in 18th-century novelists, is an ex-pat American who lived in Venice. A friend of Leon's, a famous conductor, "suggested she try a crime novel. She wrote Death at la Fenice as a joke. When she finished the book she stashed it away and forgot about it until submitting it for the Suntory prize in Japan. Somewhat to her consternation, it won and she was offered a two-book contract by Harper Collins. This meant, among other things, that she was compelled to write a sequel. 'I lucked out,' she says."

== See also ==
- Colin Dexter, author of the Inspector Morse series, set in Oxford
- Sara Paretsky, author of the V.I. Warshawski detective series, set in Chicago
