= Donna Leon =

American-Swiss crime novelist (born 1942)

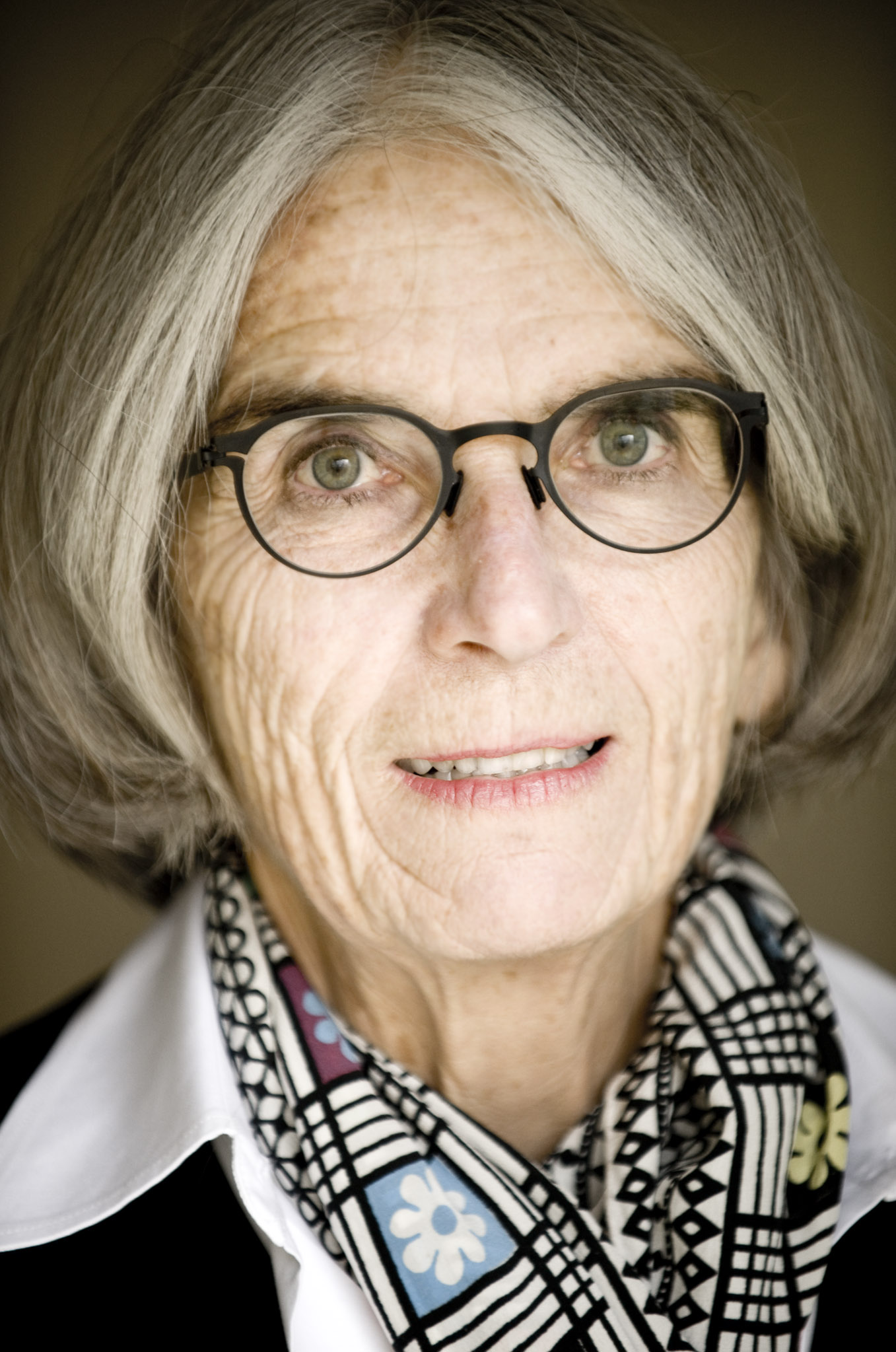
- Donna Leon, 2010
- Born: September 28, 1942 (age 84); Montclair, New Jersey, U.S.
- Occupation: Novelist
- Writing career
- Period: 1992–present
- Genre: Crime fiction
- Notable work: Death at La Fenice

Donna Leon (/ˈliːɒn/; born September 28, 1942) is the American author of a series of crime novels set in Venice, Italy, featuring the fictional hero Commissario Guido Brunetti. The novels are written in English and have been translated into many foreign languages, although – at Leon's request – not into Italian, as she formerly lived there, still visits monthly, and prefers not to have recognition in the country.

== Early life and education ==
Donna Leon was born on September 28, 1942, in Montclair, New Jersey, to Roman Catholic parents, who had strong leanings to the Democratic party. Her paternal grandparents were Spanish and her maternal grandparents were Irish and German. She grew up in Bloomfield, New Jersey, and graduated from Mount Saint Dominic Academy. Her parents put a strong focus on education for their daughter.

The Guardian reports: "Leon was teaching in Iran while attempting to complete a PhD about Jane Austen when the revolution of 1978-79 interrupted her studies and her life. When her trunks were returned to her months later, following her hasty evacuation (part of it at gunpoint, on a bus), her papers were gone." She returned to the US and worked in New York City writing advertising copy. When she visited Italy for the first time, she fell in love with the country.

== Teaching and residence ==
Leon was a lecturer in English literature for the University of Maryland University College – Europe (UMUC-Europe) in Venice and taught English from 1981 to 1990 at an American military base in Italy.

In 2015, Leon left Venice after 30 years and began to split her time between the homes she owns in Switzerland, one in Zürich and another in the mountains. As of 2016 she resided mainly in the small village of Val Müstair in the mountains of Grisons. As of 2017 she was returning to Venice approximately one week each month.

In 2020 she became a Swiss citizen.

== Career ==
Leon wrote a crime novel after seeing a scene she thought belonged in such a novel. She wrote it in 8 months and stuck it in a drawer until a friend persuaded her to submit to a writing contest, which she won.

== Setting and viewpoints of the Brunetti novels ==
The police commissioner Guido Brunetti confronts crime in and around his home town of Venice. Each case is an opportunity for the author to reveal another aspect of the seamy underside of society and another facet of Venetian life. Brunetti reports to the vain and self-serving buffoon, Vice-Questore Patta, while Sergente (later Ispettore and with the inspector per tu) Vianello and the all-knowing and well-connected Signorina Elettra, Patta's secretary, assist Brunetti on the ground and through research.

These novels are successful in Germany and have been translated into many languages, though not Italian.

== Recognition and awards ==
Her Commissario Brunetti novels are written in English but have been translated into many foreign languages, although – at Leon's request – not into Italian.

The ninth Brunetti novel, Friends in High Places, won the Crime Writers' Association Silver Dagger in 2000.

In 2003, she received the Corine Literature Prize.

German television has produced 26 Commissario Brunetti episodes for broadcast.

== Bibliography ==
=== Other novels ===
- The Jewels of Paradise (2012)

=== Non-fiction ===
==== Books ====
- Leon, Donna; Pianaro, Roberta (2010). A Taste of Venice: At Table with Brunetti (also known as Brunetti's Cookbook). New York: Atlantic Monthly Press. ISBN 978-0-8021-9710-8. OCLC 881682705.
- Leon, Donna (2013). My Venice and Other Essays (First; hardcover ed.). New York: Atlantic Monthly Press. ISBN 978-0-8021-2280-3. OCLC 895718119.
- Wandering Through Life: A Memoir (2023)
- Backstage: Stories of a writing life (2025)

==== Books with musical recordings ====
- Leon, Donna; Sowa, Michael; Handel, George Frideric; Curtis, Alan; Gauvin, Karina; Hallenberg, Ann; Agnew, Paul; Zorzi Giustiniani, Anicio (2010). Handel's Bestiary: In Search of Animals in Handel's Operas. New York: Atlantic Monthly Press. ISBN 978-0-8021-1996-4. OCLC 676727019. Book and audio recording. WorldCat summary: "A literary, visual, and musical exploration of twelve of Handel's arias referencing animals. Complemented by a CD recording, conducted by Alan Curtis with Karina Gauvin (Soprano), Ann Hallenberg (Mezzo-soprano), Paul Agnew, and Anicio Zorzi Giustiniani (Tenor)."
- Leon, Donna; Il Complesso Barocco; Minasi, Riccardo; Vivaldi, Antonio (2011). Venetian Curiosities (First ed.). New York: Atlantic Monthly Press. ISBN 978-0-8021-2280-3. OCLC 757477421. Book and audio recording. Worldcat summary: "Novelist Donna Leon recounts some legendary tales of Venice, offering insight into Venetian customs of the past and present. Includes music CD of seven concertos by Antonio Vivaldi performed by Il Complesso Barocco and conducted by Riccardo Minasi."
- Leon, Donna; Il Pomo d'Oro; Minasi, Riccardo; Capezzuto, Vincenzo; Bartoli, Cecilia (2013). Gondola. ISBN 978-0-8021-2266-7. OCLC 896728682. Book and audio recording. Worldcat summary: "Accompanied by a CD of Italian boat songs, this fascinating history of the gondola, which was first used in medieval Venice as a maneuverable getaway boat, reveals how it evolved over the centuries into a floating pleasure palace that facilitated the romantic escapades of the Venetian elite." Notes: "With a CD of Venetian barcarole performed by Il Pomo d'Oro, conducted by Riccardo Minasi, featuring Vincenzo Capezzuto and Cecilia Bartoli."

== Spin-offs ==
Leon's Commissario Brunetti novels have spawned multiple spin-off enterprises, including:

- A travel guidebook: Sepeda, Toni; Leon, Donna (April 2009). Brunetti's Venice: Walks with the City's Best-Loved Detective (Paperback ed.). New York: Grove Press. ISBN 978-0-8021-4437-9. OCLC 259266590.
- Walking Tours of Guido Brunetti's Venice with accompanying maps: Dr. Toni Sepeda,"the only lecturer authorized by Donna Leon to conduct events in Brunetti's Venice", leads individual and group tours of the locations and routes noted in Leon's Commissario Guido Brunetti novels.
