= Lothar Warneke =

German film director

- Born: 15 September 1936; Leipzig, Germany
- Died: 5 June 2005 (aged 68); Brandenburg, Germany
- Occupations: Film director Screenwriter; Actor
- Years active: 1965–1998

Lothar Warneke (15 September 1936 – 5 June 2005) was a German film director, screenwriter and actor. His 1977 film The Incorrigible Barbara was entered into the 10th Moscow International Film Festival. His 1981 film Our Short Life was entered into the 12th Moscow International Film Festival. In 1982 his film Apprehension was entered into the main competition at the 39th edition of the Venice Film Festival.

In 1986 his film Blonder Tango won both the Grand Prix and the Findling Award of the 4th National Feature Film Festival of the GDR. In 1988 he again won the Findling Award, this time for his Einer trage des anderen Last. His 1988 film Bear Ye One Another's Burden was entered into the 38th Berlin International Film Festival, where co-stars Manfred Möck and Jörg Pose won the Silver Bear for Best Actor.

== Selected filmography ==
- Dr. med. Sommer II (1970)
- The Incorrigible Barbara (1977)
- Our Short Life (1981)
- Apprehension (1982)
- Bear Ye One Another's Burden (1988)
