= Bogrov =

Bogrov, feminine: Bogrova is a Russian Jewish surname. Boris Unbegaun states that the surname comes fom the Hebrew abbreviation בגרב, B-G-R-V, meaning "Ben haRab Rabbi Baruch".

- Dmitrii Bogrov (1887–1911), Russian Jewish lawyer, anarchist, and assassin
- Grigory Bogrov (1825–1885), Russian Jewish writer
