= Der Spiegel des großen Magus =

1980 film

- Directed by: Dieter Scharfenberg
- Release date: 1980
- Country: East Germany
- Language: German

Der Spiegel des großen Magus is an East German film directed by Dieter Scharfenberg. It was released in 1980.

== Cast ==
- Eberhard Esche: Magus
- Juraj Ďurdiak: Elias
- Klaus Piontek: Pravos
- Hanna Bieluszko–Vajda: Hanna
- Günter Naumann: Harom
- Cox Habbema: Airin
- Gerry Wolff: Aram
- Petr Skarke: Simon
