= Our Short Life =

1981 film

- Directed by: Lothar Warneke
- Written by: Regine Kühn; Brigitte Reimann; Lothar Warneke
- Produced by: Horst Hartwig
- Starring: Simone Frost
- Cinematography: Claus Neumann
- Release date: 16 January 1981
- Running time: 113 minutes
- Country: East Germany
- Language: German

Our Short Life (German: Unser kurzes Leben) is a 1981 East German drama film directed by Lothar Warneke. It was entered into the 12th Moscow International Film Festival.

== Cast ==
- Simone Frost as Franziska Linkerhand
- Hermann Beyer as Schafheutlin
- Gottfried Richter as Trojanowicz
- Dietrich Körner as Professor Reger
- Christian Steyer as Jazwauk
- Christine Schorn as Gertrud
- Barbara Dittus as Frau Hellwig
- Dieter Knust as Verwalter
- Helmut Straßburger as Kowalski
- Annemone Haase as Frau Kowalski
- Uwe Kockisch as Wolfgang
