= Commissar (film) =

1967 Soviet film by Aleksandr Askoldov

- Film poster (1987)
- Directed by: Aleksandr Askoldov
- Written by: Aleksandr Askoldov
- Based on: In the Town of Berdichev by: Vasily Grossman; Red Cavalry; by Isaac Babel
- Starring: Nonna Mordyukova; Rolan Bykov
- Cinematography: Valeriy Ginzburg
- Edited by: Natalya Loginova; Svetlana Lyashinskaya; Nina Vasilyeva
- Music by: Alfred Schnittke
- Production company: Gorky Film Studio
- Release date: 1967
- Running time: 110 minutes
- Country: Soviet Union
- Language: Russian

Commissar (Note: (Russian: Комиссар, romanized: Komissar); Also called "The Commissar" in English) is a 1967 Soviet film directed by Aleksandr Askoldov. The film stars Nonna Mordyukova as Klavdiya Vavilova, a commissar in the Russian Civil War, who falls pregnant and is made to live with the family of a poor Jewish blacksmith (Rolan Bykov).

Commissar was the first and only film made by Askoldov. He based the film on In the Town of Berdychev, a short story by Vasily Grossman, as well as Isaac Babel's story cycle Red Cavalry. Upon its release, it was banned for 21 years, and only released fully in 1988. It won several awards.

== Plot ==
Around 1920 or 1921, a female commissar of the Red Army cavalry, Klavdiya Vavilova, oversees the execution of a soldier, Emelin, for desertion. Later, she discovers that she is pregnant from her lover, Kirill. Until her child is born, she is forced to stay with the family of a poor Jewish blacksmith named Yefim Magazannik, his wife Maria, mother-in-law and six children. At first, both the Magazannik family and Vavilova are not enthusiastic about living under one roof, but soon the Magazanniks share their rationed food, make her civilian clothes, and help her with the delivery of her newborn son, named Kirill after his father. Vavilova seemingly embraces motherhood, civilian life, and new friends.

Meanwhile, the frontline advances closer to the town and the Jews expect a pogrom by the White Army as the Red Army retreats. Vavilova hides with the Magazanniks in their basement as the White Army approaches. Yefim begins to dance with his children; Vavilova, watching them, has a vision of the fate of the Jews in Holocaust. She rushes to the front to rejoin her army regiment, leaving her newborn with the Magazanniks.

== Cast ==
- Nonna Mordyukova as commissar Klavdiya Vavilova
- Rolan Bykov as Yefim Magazannik
- Raisa Nedashkovskaya as Maria, Yefim's wife
- Vasily Shukshin as Kozyrev, regiment's commander
- Otar Koberidze as Kirill, Vavilova's dead lover
- Lyudmila Volynskaya as Yefim's mother-in-law
- Lyuba Kats as Roza Magazannik, the oldest child of the Magazannik family
- Vutsya Mitsman as a street musician
- Vladimir Donilin as a soldier
- V. Grigoryev as a Catholic priest
- Valeriy Ginzburg as a rabbi

Additionally, three of the Magazannik sons are played by Pavlik Levin, Igor Fishman and Dima Kleiman.

== Production ==
Askoldov had previously been a student of philology at the Moscow State University and then a bureaucrat at the Ministry of Culture. In 1964, Askoldov left his position at the Ministry of Culture and enrolled in a two-year programme for directors and screenwriters. Commissar was his debut feature.

Askoldov submitted the screenplay for the film to Gorky Studio in 1965 and pitched the film as a celebration of the 50th anniversary of the Russian Revolution. The screenplay was approved and passed on to Goskino officials, who demanded revisions. Askoldov revised the screenplay in July 1966.

The then-head of Goskino, Aleksei V. Romanov, privately informed Askoldov that the film could be released if the characters' nationality was changed and the Holocaust sequence removed from the film; Askoldov refused to do so. Romanov also requested changes to Vavilova's characterization; although Askoldov promised to enact the changes, he did not do so.

=== Filming ===
Filming took place in 1966. Although the story is set in Berdychev, Askoldov chose to shoot the film in Kamianets-Podilskyi, with a few scenes shot in Tsuriupynsk. Askoldov struggled to find Jews willing to participate in the film — the Jews in Kamianets-Podilskyi refused to participate in the shooting of the film, so he searched in the city of Khotyn for Jews who were willing to shoot scenes. When the Jews there also refused to participate as extras in the film, he wrote to the Central Committee of the Communist Party of Ukraine, seeking Jewish extras; the Communist Party sent extras who reluctantly participated in the shooting of the film. A Holocaust sequence was shot in the very location in Kamianets-Podilskyi where Jews had been executed by Nazi forces.

== Analysis ==
=== Influences ===
==== Literary ====
The film is based on Vasily Grossman's short story In The Town of Berdychev (Russian: В городе Бердычеве), although material from Isaac Babel's story cycle Red Cavalry was also added to the film. The narrator of Red Cavalry, the Jewish commissar Kirill Lyutov, is replaced by the Russian commissar Vavilova; additionally, Vavilova's lover is named Kirill and wears glasses, a possible reference to Lyutov. Yefim Magazannik, meanwhile, takes inspiration from another character in Red Cavalry, Gedali.

Askoldov was likewise influenced by the writings of author Mikhail Bulgakov. As a student of philology at Moscow State University, he wrote an (unfinished) dissertation on Bulgakov's work, and befriended his widow, Elena Sergeevna Bulgakova. Bulgakov's works The White Guard, The Days of the Turbins and Flight, like Commissar, take place during the Russian Civil War, and inform Askoldov's depiction of the Civil War, in particular, the depiction of the Russian Revolution as apocalyptic. Additionally, the director chose to film Commissar in Kamianets-Podilskyi as an homage to Bulgakov, who had been stationed there as a military doctor in 1916.

==== Film ====
The style of the film is informed by early Soviet experimental cinema. Olga Gershenson describes the imagery of the film as inspired by Alexander Dovzhenko and the narrative as inspired by the works of Vsevolod Pudovkin. Anne Williamson writes that the influence of Pudovkin and Sergei Eisenstein is felt in the use of montage in certain sequences of the film.

Bykov's depiction of Yefim Magazannik has been compared to Solomon Mikhoels' role in the 1925 Soviet silent film Jewish Luck. According to Askoldov, the morning dance that Magazannik performs is an homage to Mikhoels. Bykov also based his depiction of Yefim on the Soviet Jewish poet Mikhail Svetlov.

=== Depiction of Jews ===
My new hero is very much unlike those nice, kind, humorous Jews, who have become the staple of our cinema. To play this role, one needs bright colors, sharp lines; I am not afraid at times to be petty and non-pretty...I love this man, Yefim Magazannik, since he is full of life. There is a war going on somewhere, but he lives, works, loves his wife, rears his children, thinks...He is a philosopher who has his own dreams.

— Rolan Bykov in an interview for the film magazine Soviet Screen, 1967

Askoldov himself was born to a Jewish father and sheltered by a Jewish family after the arrest of his parents. The family was killed in Babi Yar, and Askoldov stated in an interview that he made the film as a tribute to that family. Scholar Denise J. Youngblood calls Commissar the first Russian film in which Jewish characters have major, sympathetic roles.

Olga Gershenson wrote that the film is one of the most Jewish Soviet films — a Jewish family are major characters, it is one of the few Soviet films where Yiddish and Hebrew is heard, its soundtrack is based om klezmer music, and items important to Jewish life, such as a mezuzah and a portrait of a rabbi are shown. She also argued that Vavilova's lover, Kirill, is Jewish — unlike in the short story, he wears wire-rimmed glasses as a reference to the Jewish writer Isaac Babel, and Vavilova takes her newborn both to a church and a synagogue, in both a symbolic baptism and bris (circumcision), and that Vavilova's vision of the Holocaust is directly tied to her own child.

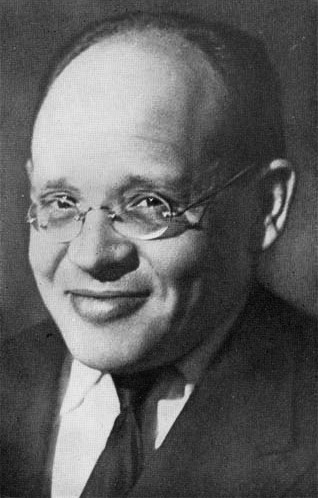
Portrait of the Jewish writer Isaac Babel. The character of Vavilova's lover makes several references to the author and his works, possibly implying that he himself is Jewish.

Historian Victoria Khiterer criticized the film's depiction of Jews and Judaism. The main Jewish characters of the short story, Khaim-Abram Leibovich and Beila, are given more "gentile" names, Yefim and Maria, in the film. Askoldov additionally added symbolism from the New Testament that did not exist in Grossman's short story — for instance, a scene where Yefim washes Maria's feet, and many scenes with statues of the Madonna and beautiful churches and only one (ruined) synagogue. Historian Victoria Khiterer claims that Askoldov made these changes so as to appeal to a gentile audience, and in the instance of the churches and ruined synagogue, intentionally suggested "the dominance of Christianity over Judaism, which lies in ruins". Additionally, she commented that the depiction of Jews, although sympathetic, is stereotypical and uncharacteristic of how Jews at the time would behave— although the Magazanniks are not described physically by Grossman, Askoldov depicted Maria as young and beautiful and Yefim as old, ugly and dirty, a stereotypical depiction of Jews found in prerevolutionary Russian literature; the Magazannik children play at being antisemtitic "pogrom-makers" and choose their sister to be the "Jew" who is to be tortured and "killed", and the Jewish characters are indifferent to Jewish traditions or at times do things antithetical to Jewish tradition.

On 29 December 1967, at a meeting of Goskino, the decision to ban the film was made. The then-head of Goskino, Aleksei V. Romanov, stated that Jewish members of Goskino found the film, particularly Bykov's depiction of the Jewish protagonist, antisemitic. Khiterer suggests that the stereotypical depiction of Jews, as well as the depiction of Jews as passive, may have upset Jewish critics who watched the film.

== Release ==
In July 1968, the film was banned, in spite of support for the film from directors such as Sergei Gerasimov and Mikhail Romm. Askoldov was charged with social parasitism and expelled from the Communist Party. Askoldov claimed that his wife stole film cans containing the film to save it from destruction by Soviet authorities.

In 1986, Soviet authorities instructed Goskino to allow the film to be screened in the USSR and abroad, to let Askoldov make changes to the film that he deemed necessary and to permit Askoldov to work as a film director once more. However, certain directors who had opposed the film upon its initial release, such as Sergey Bondarchuk and Stanislav Rostotsky, as well as the head of Goskino Filipp Ermash opposed this decision and did not reverse the ban. However, Askoldov was permitted to revise the film.

At the 15th Moscow International Film Festival in 1987, director Elem Klimov, head of the Union of Soviet Cinematographers stated at a press conference on 9 July that all films that had previously been banned in the USSR were released. Askoldov, who was present at the press conference, took the microphone and informed the audience that Commissar was still banned. The next day, Mikhail Gorbachev met with Colombian Nobel Laureate for Literature Gabriel García Márquez, who had been in attendance at the press conference, and who asked him on behalf of the jury of the film festival to release the film. The day after, a surviving copy of the film was shown. In 1988, the film was restored entirely by Mosfilm and released.

== Reception ==
In its first year of release, Commissar was watched by over 3,5 million viewers. The film won the Silver Bear - Special Jury Prize at the 38th Berlin International Film Festival in 1988, four professional Nika Awards (1989), including one to composer Alfred Schnittke, and other awards. The film was selected as the Soviet entry for the Best Foreign Language Film at the 61st Academy Awards, but was not accepted as a nominee.

Olga Carlisle, in a review for the New York Times, stated that the film dealt "honestly and compassionately" with the fate of Jews in the Soviet Union, and that Commissar placed Askoldov among the greatest Soviet filmmakers of his generation, alongside Andrei Tarkovsky, Sergey Parajanov and Tengiz Abuladze. Kevin Thomas, writing for the Los Angeles Times, named it one of the great films of Russian cinema and praised Ginzburg's cinematography and Schnittke's score. Walter Goodman, also writing for the New York Times, praised the film as a "brave, humane and powerful work", although he criticized Vavilova's character as not fully realized. Anne Williamson of Film Comment praised Askoldov's use of montage; she also praised the performances of Mordyukova, Bykov and Nedashkovskaya.

== See also ==
- List of submissions to the 61st Academy Awards for Best Foreign Language Film
- List of Soviet submissions for the Academy Award for Best Foreign Language Film
