= Apprehension =

Apprehension may refer to:

- Apprehension (understanding), awareness or understanding of something by the mind
- Arrest by law-enforcement officers
- Fear
- Anxiety
- Apprehension (film), a 1982 film by Lothar Warneke
