= Guglielmo Biraghi =

Italian film critic

- Born: 1 September 1927; Florence, Italy
- Died: 23 April 2001 (aged 73); Rome, Italy
- Occupation: Film critic

Guglielmo Biraghi (1 September 1927 – 23 April 2001) was an Italian critic and film festival director. He was the director of the Taormina Film Fest in the 1970s and became the 14th director of the Venice Film Festival in 1987. In 1970, he was a member of the jury at the 1970 Cannes Film Festival and in 1988, he was the Head of the Jury at the 38th Berlin International Film Festival.

== Personal life ==
In 1969, he married actress Annabella Incontrera but they divorced a few years later.
