= 38th Berlin International Film Festival =

1988 film festival in West Berlin, Germany

- Festival poster
- Opening film: Linie 1
- Location: West Berlin, Germany
- Founded: 1951
- Awards: Golden Bear: Red Sorghum
- No. of films: 447 films
- Festival date: 12 – 23 February 1988
- Website: http://www.berlinale.de

Berlin International Film Festival chronology
- 39th 37th

The 38th annual Berlin International Film Festival was held from 12 to 23 February 1988. The festival opened with musical film Linie 1 by Reinhard Hauff.

The Golden Bear was awarded to the Chinese film Red Sorghum directed by Zhang Yimou.

The retrospective was dedicated to colour films and it was titled The History of Colour Film. Originally West German actor Gert Fröbe was selected as Jury President but later he had to decline due to illness, after which Moritz de Hadeln appointed the Italian film critic Guglielmo Biraghi as the Jury President.

== Juries ==
=== Main Competition ===
The following people were announced as being on the jury for the festival:

- Guglielmo Biraghi, Italian journalist and film critic - Jury President
- Ellen Burstyn, American actress
- Heiner Carow, East-German filmmaker
- Eberhard Junkersdorf, West-German producer
- Tom Luddy, American producer and co-founder of the Telluride Film Festival
- Heinz Rathsack, West-German film historian
- Daniel Schmid, Swiss filmmaker
- Andrei Smirnov, Soviet actor and filmmaker
- Tilda Swinton, British actress
- Anna-Lena Wibom, Swedish producer and actress
- Pavlos Zannas, Greek writer and film critic

== Official Sections ==
=== Main Competition ===
The following films were in competition for the Golden Bear:

English title	Original title	Director(s)	Production Country
Bear Ye One Another's Burden	Einer trage des anderen Last	Lothar Warneke	East Germany
Broadcast News		James L. Brooks	United States
Commissar	Комиссар	Aleksandr Askoldov	Soviet Union
The Felons	Hudodelci	Franci Slak	Yugoslavia
Ground Zero		Bruce Myles, Michael Pattinson	Australia
Hunting Time	Av Zamanı	Erden Kıral	Turkey
Jarrapellejos		Antonio Giménez-Rico	Spain
Kung-Fu Master		Agnès Varda	France
Life Classes		William D. MacGillivray	Canada
Moonstruck		Norman Jewison	United States
The Mother of Kings	Matka Królów	Janusz Zaorski	Poland
Phera		Buddhadeb Dasgupta	India
The Possessed	Les possédés	Andrzej Wajda	France
Red Sorghum	紅高粱	Zhang Yimou	China
Theophilos	Θεόφιλος	Lakis Papastathis	Greece
Verónico Cruz	La deuda interna	Miguel Pereira	Argentina, United Kingdom
Walker		Alex Cox	United States, Mexico, Spain
Wohin?		Herbert Achternbusch	West Germany
Yasemin		Hark Bohm	West Germany, Turkey

=== Out of competition ===
1988 Retrospective poster, dedicated to Color Films

- Něco z Alenky, directed by Jan Švankmajer (Czechoslovakia, United Kingdom)
- Больше света Bol'se sveta!, directed by Marina Babak (Soviet Union)
- Hail! Hail! Rock 'n' Roll, directed by Taylor Hackford (United States)
- Cry Freedom, directed by Richard Attenborough (United Kingdom)
- Empire of the Sun, director Steven Spielberg (United States)
- Linie 1, directed by Reinhard Hauff (West Germany)
- Little Dorrit, directed by Christine Edzard (UK)
- Nuts, directed by Martin Ritt (United States)
- Powaqqatsi: Life in Transformation, directed by Godfrey Reggio (United States)
- September, directed by Woody Allen (United States)
- The Story of Asya Klyachina, directed by Andrei Konchalovsky (Soviet Union)

=== Retrospective ===
The following films were shown in the retrospective titled "The History of Colour Film":

English title	Original title	Director(s)	Production country
A Colour Box		Len Lye	United Kingdom
The Adventures of Robin Hood		Michael Curtiz	United States
The Adventures of Tom Sawyer		Norman Taurog	United States
A Matter of Life and Death		Emeric Pressburger and Michael Powell	United Kingdom
Anticipation of the Night		Stan Brakhage	United States
A Star Is Born		William A. Wellman	United States
The Band Concert		Wilfred Jackson	United States
Barry Lyndon		Stanley Kubrick	United Kingdom, United States
The Belle of New York		Charles Walters	United States
The Birth of The Robot		Len Lye	United Kingdom
Black Narcissus		Emeric Pressburger and Michael Powell	United Kingdom
Blood and Sand		Rouben Mamoulian	United States
Brigadoon		Vincente Minnelli	United States
The Cabinet of Dr. Caligari	Das Cabinett des Dr.Caligari	Robert Wiene	Germany
Carmen Comes Home	カルメン故郷に帰る	Keisuke Kinoshita	Japan
Circles	Kreise	Oskar Fischinger	Germany
Composition in Blue	Komposition in Blau	Oskar Fischinger	Germany
Concerning $1000		(unknown)	United States
La Cucaracha		Lloyd Corrigan	United States
Doctor X		Michael Curtiz	United States
Duel In The Sun		King Vidor	United States
English Harvest		Humphrey Jennings	United Kingdom
Fantasia		James Algar, Samuel Armstrong, Ford Beebe Jr., Norman Ferguson, David Hand, Jim Handley, T. Hee, Wilfred Jackson, Hamilton Luske, Bill Roberts, Paul Satterfield and Ben Sharpsteen	United States
For Whom the Bell Tolls		Sam Wood	United States
Four Around a Woman	Vier um die Frau	Fritz Lang	Germany
The Garden of Allah		Richard Boleslawski	United States
Gate of Hell	地獄門	Teinosuke Kinugasa	Japan
Gloria!		Hollis Frampton	United States
Gold Diggers of Broadway		Roy Del Ruth	United States
Gone To Earth		Emeric Pressburger and Michael Powell	United Kingdom
Great Freedom No. 7	Große Freiheit Nr. 7	Helmut Käutner	Germany
The Great Sacrifice	Opfergang	Veit Harlan	Germany
Gypsy Sweetheart		Ralph Staub	United States
House of Usher		Roger Corman	United States
The Inhuman Woman	L'Inhumaine	Marcel L'Herbier	France
Johnny Guitar		Nicholas Ray	United States
King of Jazz		John Murray Anderson	United States
Late Autumn	秋日和	Yasujirō Ozu	Japan
Lola		Rainer Werner Fassbinder	West Germany
Made in U.S.A.		Jean-Luc Godard	France
Märkische Fahrt		Kurt Rupli	Germany
Memphis Belle: A Story of a Flying Fortress		William Wyler	United States
Moby Dick		John Huston	United States
Mode in Paris und Berlin vor dem 1. Weltkrieg		(unknown)	Germany
Moulin Rouge		John Huston	United Kingdom
Münchhausen		Josef von Báky	Germany
Muratti Marches On	Muratti greift ein	Oskar Fischinger	Germany
Mystery of the Wax Museum		Michael Curtiz	United States
The Nightingale	Соловей-Соловушко	Nikolai Ekk	Soviet Union
One From The Heart		Francis Ford Coppola	United States
On Parade		George Pal	United Kingdom
The Passenger	Professione: reporter	Michelangelo Antonioni	Italy, Spain, France
The Phantom Carriage	Körkarlen	Victor Sjöström	Sweden
Potsdam	Potsdam	(unknown)	Germany
The Pretty Miller Girl	La Belle Meunière	Marcel Pagnol	France
The Quiet Man		John Ford	United States
Ramona		Henry King	United States
The Red Balloon	Le ballon rouge	Albert Lamorisse	France
The Red Shoes		Emeric Pressburger and Michael Powell	United Kingdom
The River	Le Fleuve	Jean Renoir	France, India, United States
Senso		Luchino Visconti	Italy
Serene Velocity		Ernie Gehr	United States
She Wore A Yellow Ribbon		John Ford	United States
Sons of Liberty		Michael Curtiz	United States
The Sword of Monte Cristo		Maurice Geraghty	United States
The Story of Little Mook: Tales from Europe	Die Geschichte vom kleinen Muck	Wolfgang Staudte	East Germany
Three Little Pigs		Burt Gillett	United States
The Toll of the Sea		Chester M. Franklin	United States
The Trail Of The Lonesome Pine		Henry Hathaway	United States
The Trouble with Harry		Alfred Hitchcock	United States
The Tree of Wooden Clogs	L'albero d'egli zoccoli	Ermanno Olmi	Italy
Unser Hindenburg		(unknown)	Germany
The Viking		Roy William Neill	United States
Way Down East		David Wark Griffith	United States
Will Success Spoil Rock Hunter?		Frank Tashlin	United States
The Wrestler and the Clown	Борец и клоун	Boris Barnet and Konstantin Yudin	Soviet Union

== Official Awards ==
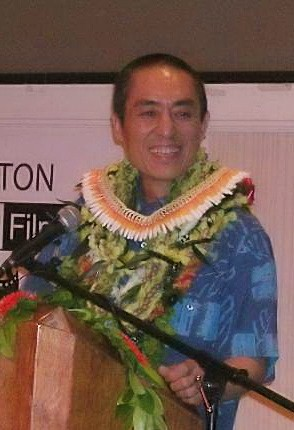
Zhang Yimou, winner of the Golden Bear at the event

The following prizes were awarded by the Jury:

- Golden Bear: Red Sorghum by Zhang Yimou
- Silver Bear – Special Jury Prize: Comissar by Aleksandr Askoldov
- Silver Bear for Best Director: Norman Jewison for Moonstruck
- Silver Bear for Best Actress: Holly Hunter for Broadcast News
- Silver Bear for Best Actor: Manfred Möck and Jörg Pose for Bear Ye One Another's Burden
- Silver Bear for an outstanding single achievement: Matka Królów by Janusz Zaorski
- Silver Bear for an outstanding artistic contribution: Verónico Cruz by Miguel Pereira

== Independent Awards ==
=== FIPRESCI Award ===
- Comissar by Aleksandr Askoldov
