= According to the Plan =

2007 film

- German: Frei nach Plan
- Directed by: Franziska Meletzky
- Starring: Dagmar Manzel; Corinna Harfouch
- Release date: 17 June 2007 (SIFF)
- Running time: 90 minutes
- Country: Germany
- Language: German

According to the Plan (German: Frei nach Plan) is a 2007 German film directed by Franziska Meletzky.

== Cast ==
- Dagmar Manzel - Anne
- Corinna Harfouch - Iris
- Kirsten Block - Marianne
- Christine Schorn - Silvia
- Robert Gallinowski - Martin
- Otto Mellies - Wolf
- Simone Kabst - Britta
- Matthias Brenner - Fotograf Micky
