= Eolomea =

- Cover of 2005 re-release
- Directed by: Herrmann Zschoche
- Written by: Willi Brückner
- Starring: Cox Habbema; Ivan Andonov; Rolf Hoppe; Vsevolod Sanayev; Peter Slabakov
- Cinematography: Günter Jaeuthe
- Edited by: Helga Gentz
- Music by: Günther Fischer
- Release date: 1972
- Running time: 79 minutes
- Countries: East Germany; Soviet Union; Bulgaria
- Languages: German, Russian

Eolomea is a 1972 science fiction drama film directed by Herrmann Zschoche, based on the book of the same name by Angel Wagenstein. The film was an East German/Soviet/Bulgarian coproduction.

== Plot ==
Authorities responsible for Earth’s spaceflight safety grow increasingly concerned over unexplained incidents at the "Margo" space base, where several ships and their crews have mysteriously disappeared over three days. Following a special session, the Institute of Space Research issues a temporary flight ban until the cause is identified. Professor Maria Scholl suspects that fellow scientist Professor Oli Tal is withholding key information. She arranges a private meeting and learns about an unusual phenomenon observed in the late 19th century by British astronomers: a mysterious light in the Cygnus constellation that appears every 24 years. Soviet astronomers, after the first space flights, hypothesized that the light could be an artificial signal, potentially a powerful laser probing the Solar System for signs of life.

Pierre Brodsky, a senior researcher at the Mount Ararat observatory, conducts calculations and concludes that the signal might originate from a symmetrical twin of Earth, devoid of poles and tropics, which he names “Eternal Spring” or "Eolomea" after decoding its Morse signal. Eager to reach Eolomea, Professor Tal proposes a mission, but the council deems it unfeasible given the current limitations of rocket speed. Undeterred, a group of 146 young scientists, unwilling to passively wait for alien contact, takes drastic action. They seize rockets necessary for the mission, embarking without formal approval in hopes of realizing humanity’s dream of encountering extraterrestrial intelligence.

== Cast ==
- Cox Habbema: Prof. Maria Scholl
- Ivan Andonov: Daniel Lagny
- Rolf Hoppe: Prof. Oli Tal
- Vsevolod Sanayev: Kun, the pilot
- Peter Slabakov: Pierre Brodski
- Wolfgang Greese: Chairman
- Holger Mahlich: Navigator
- Benjamin Besson: Capt. Sima Kun
- Evelyn Opoczynski: colleague of Scholl
- Heidemarie Schneider: colleague of Sima Kun

== Editions ==
The original, uncut version of the film was rereleased by the DEFA Film Library at the University of Massachusetts Amherst in 2005.

== Bibliography ==
- Fritzsche, Sonja. "A Natural and Artificial Homeland: East German Science-Fiction Film Responds to Kubrick and Tarkovsky." Film & History (03603695) 40.2 (2010): 80–101.
- Kruschel, Karsten: "Leim für die Venus. Der Science-Fiction-Film in der DDR." Das Science Fiction Jahr 2007 ed. Sascha Mamczak and Wolfgang Jeschke. Heyne Verlag, 2007: 803–888. ISBN 978-3453522619.
- Lessard, John. "Iron Curtain Auteurs." Cineaste 34.3 (2009): 5–11.
- Stott, Rosemary. "Continuity and Change in GDR Cinema Programming Policy 1979–1989: the Case of the American Science Fiction Import." German Life & Letters 55.1 (2002): 91.
