= Eberhard Esche =

German actor

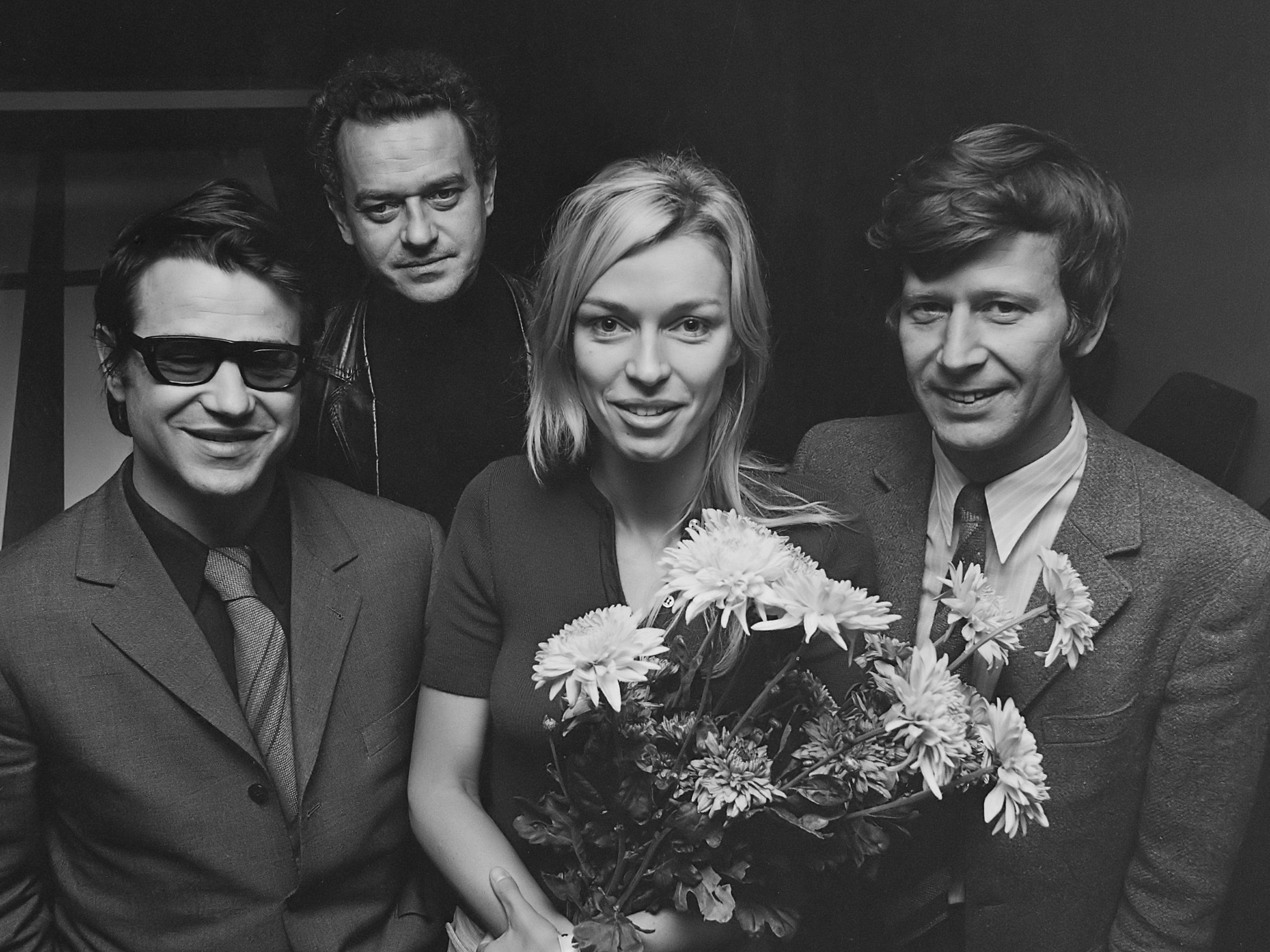
Hilmar Thate, Wolfgang Bayer, Cox Habbema and (r.) Eberhard Esche (1971)

Eberhard Esche (October 25, 1933 in Leipzig – May 15, 2006 in Berlin) was a German film and television actor. He studied at the Theaterhochschule Leipzig.

He appeared in the following:

- For Eyes Only (1961)
- Nebel (1963)
- Divided Heaven (1964)
- The Investigation – Oratorio in 11 Cantos (1966) (TV)
- Angeklagter Klehr
- Die Perser (1966) (TV)
- Traces of Stones (1966)
- The Little Prince (1966) (TV)
- Geschichten jener Nacht (1967)
- Mord am Montag (1968)
- Wie heiratet man einen König (1969)
- Anlauf (1970) (TV)
- KLK Calling PTZ – The Red Orchestra (1971)
- Ripe Cherries (1972)
- Sechse kommen durch die Welt (1972, voice only)
- Der Leutnant vom Schwanenkietz (1974) (TV)
- Leben mit Uwe (1974)
- Till Eulenspiegel (1974)
- Beethoven - Tage aus einem Leben (1976)
- The Incorrigible Barbara (1977)
- Scharnhorst (1978) (mini) TV Series (voice)
- Fleur Lafontaine (1978)
- Der Spiegel des großen Magus (1980)
- Märkische Forschungen (1981)
- Sachsens Glanz und Preußens Gloria: Brühl (1985) (TV)
- Einzug ins Paradies (1987) (TV)
- Sachsens Glanz und Preußens Gloria - Aus dem siebenjährigen Krieg (1987)
- The Drinker (1995) (TV)
- Novalis: The Blue Flower (1995)
- Mama ist unmöglich (1997)
- The Sisters' House (2002) (TV)

== Death ==
He died on 15 May 2006 in Berlin, Germany from pancreatic cancer, aged 72.
