= Aleksandr Askoldov =

Soviet Russian actor and film director

- Born: Aleksandr Yakovlevich Askoldov; 17 June 1932; Moscow, Russian SSR, Soviet Union
- Died: 21 May 2018 (aged 85); Sweden
- Occupation: Film director

Aleksandr Yakovlevich Askoldov (Russian: Александр Яковлевич Аскольдов; 17 June 1932 – 21 May 2018) was a Soviet Russian actor and film director.

== Life and career ==
Askoldov was born in 1932 in Moscow; soon after his birth, his family moved to Kiev. His father was Iakov Askoldov (né Kalmanovich), a Jewish man from Slutsk who was a commissar during the Russian Civil War and later a manager of a factory in Kiev. His mother, Aleksandra, was an ethnic Russian who worked as a medical doctor. In 1937, his father was arrested and executed. His mother was arrested shortly after and released in 1941. The 5-year-old Askoldov heard the NKVD officers say that they would return for the boy and ran to his parents' friends, a large Jewish family, and hid with them for several months, after which they sent him to his maternal grandmother, Pelageia Ivanovna, in Moscow.

Upon graduation from Moscow Lomonosov University in 1955 and the Gorky Institute of World Literature in 1958, Askoldov worked as an administrator for the USSR Ministry of Culture and for Goskino’s Main Department of Feature Film Production, where he was the supervisor for the Gorky Studio for Children’s and Youth Films. Askoldov then studied film direction with Leonid Trauberg at the Supreme Courses for Screenwriters and Directors (VKSR), graduating in 1966. He directed his first and only film, Commissar (1967). The film was banned for more than 20 years. Its banning, caused by dissatisfaction by the authorities with his "party" direction, and his refusal to change certain aspects pertaining to characterisation in the film (which they requested), put an end to his career as a director in the USSR.

=== Commissar ===
The montage of Komissar coincided with the end of the Six-Day War, and since Askoldov refused to change the ethnic origin of the Jewish family, he condemned himself to official ostracism. After making the movie, Askoldov lost his job, was expelled from the Communist Party, charged with social parasitism, exiled from Moscow and banned from working on feature films for life. He was told that the single copy of the film had been destroyed. Mordyukova and Bykov, major Soviet movie stars, had to plead with the authorities to spare him of even bigger charges. The film was shelved by Goskino for twenty years.

In 1986, due to glasnost policies, the "Conflict Commission" of the Soviet Film-makers Union recommended the re-release of the movie but Goskino refused to act. After a plea from Askoldov at the Moscow Film Festival, when the dissolution of the Soviet Union was imminent, the film was reconstructed and finally released in 1988.

The film won the Silver Bear - Special Jury Prize at the 38th Berlin International Film Festival in 1988, and four professional Nika Awards (1988).
