= The Incorrigible Barbara =

1977 film

- Directed by: Lothar Warneke
- Written by: Lothar Warneke
- Starring: Cox Habbema
- Cinematography: Jürgen Lenz
- Release date: 11 March 1977
- Running time: 109 minutes
- Country: East Germany
- Language: German

The Incorrigible Barbara (German: Die unverbesserliche Barbara) is a 1977 East German drama film written and directed by Lothar Warneke. It was entered into the 10th Moscow International Film Festival.

== Cast ==
- Cox Habbema as Barbara
- Peter Aust as Herbert
- Hertha Thiele as Schwiegermutter
- Werner Godemann as Ferdinand
- Eberhard Esche as Ekki
- Adolf Fischer
- Renate Krößner
- Lothar Warneke
