= Dr. med. Sommer II =

1970 East German dram film

- Directed by: Lothar Warneke
- Release date: 1970
- Country: East Germany
- Language: German

Dr. med. Sommer II is an East German drama film. It was released in 1970 and was directed by Lothar Warneke.
