= Jörg Pose =

German actor

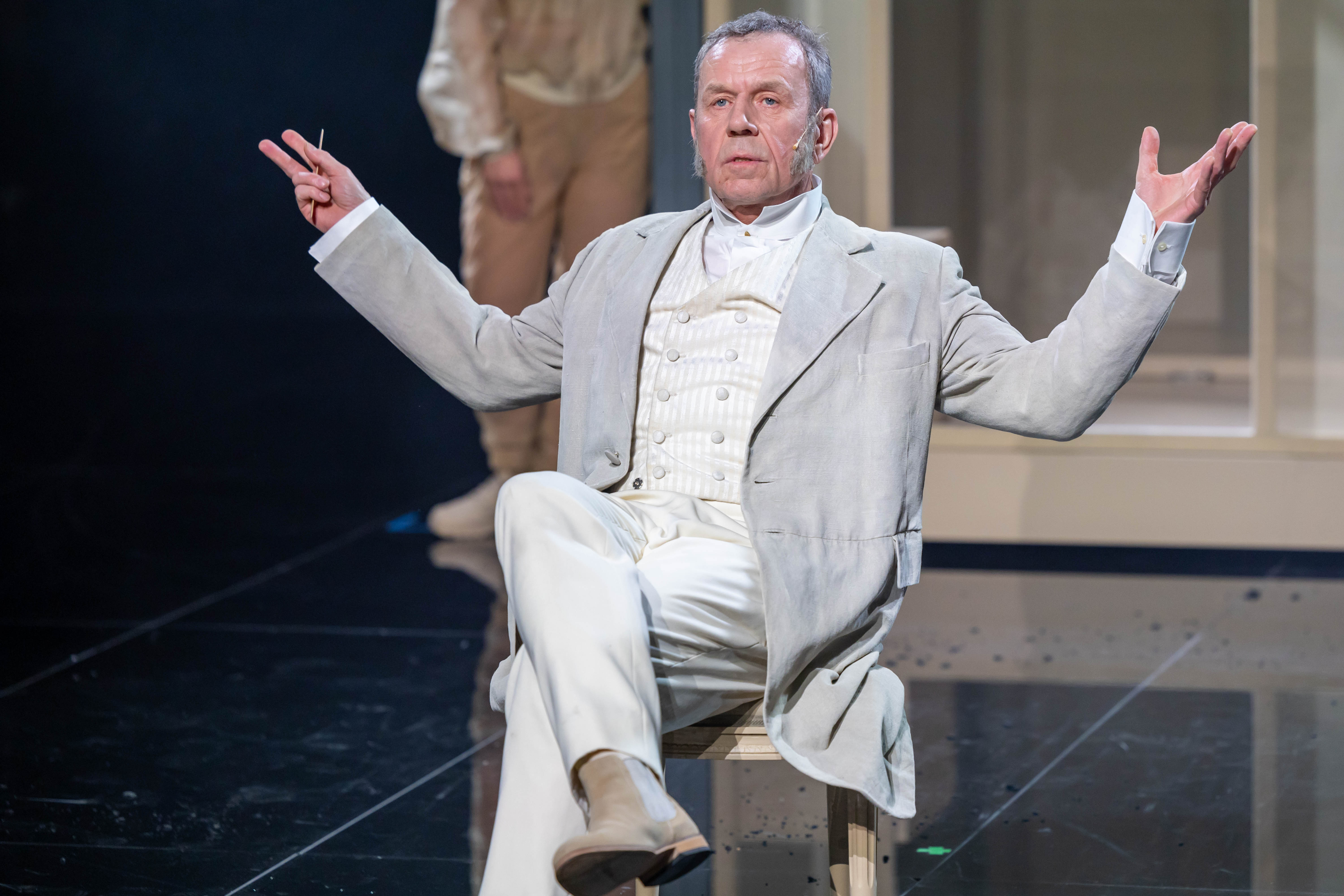
- Born: 18 May 1959 (age 67); Rostock, East Germany
- Occupation: Actor
- Years active: 1988–present

Jörg Pose (born 18 May 1959) is a German actor. He starred in the 1988 film Bear Ye One Another's Burden and with co-star Manfred Möck, won the Silver Bear for Best Actor at the 38th Berlin International Film Festival.

== Selected filmography ==
- Bear Ye One Another's Burden (1988)
- I Am Guilty (2005)
