= Silver Bear for Best Actor =

Discontinued award presented by the Berlin International Film Festival

- Silberner Bär/Bester Darsteller (German)
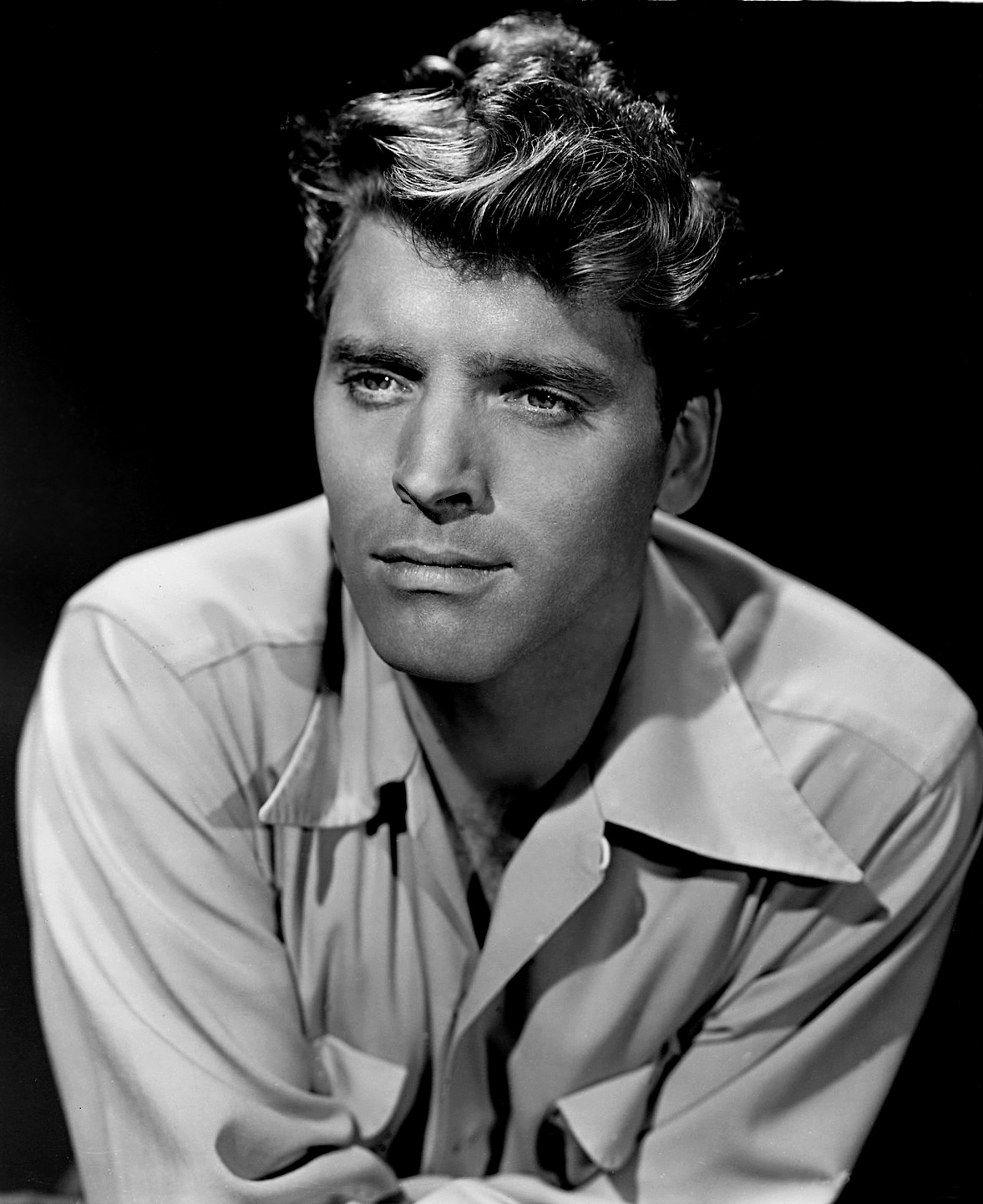
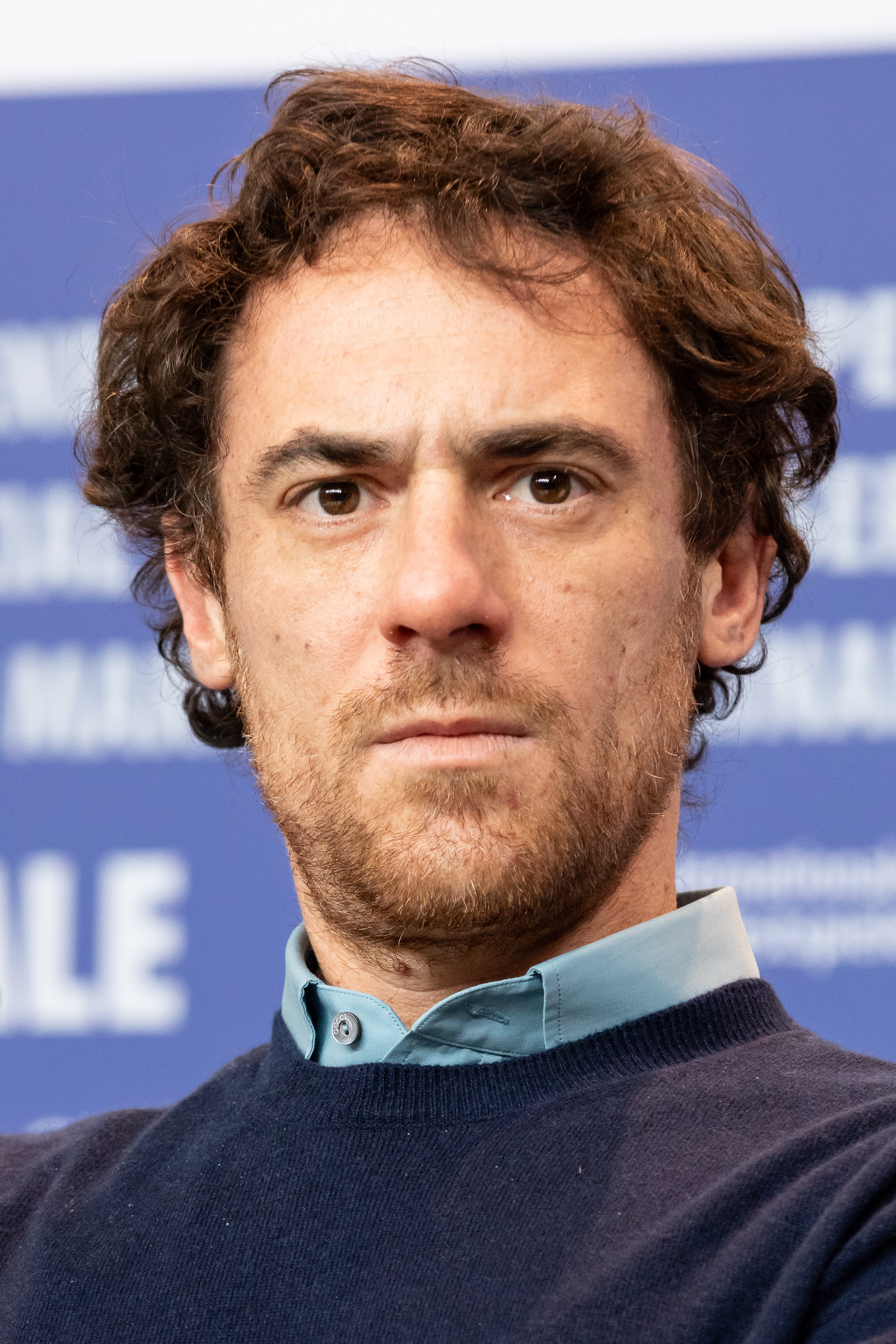
- The first and the last Silver Bear for Best Actor winner: Burt Lancaster (1956) and Elio Germano (2020)
- Awarded for: Best Performance by an Actor
- Country: Germany
- Presented by: Berlin International Film Festival
- First award: 1956
- Final award: 2020; 6 years ago
- Currently held by: Elio Germano; Hidden Away (2020)
- Website: www.berlinale.de

The Silver Bear for Best Actor (German: Silberner Bär/Bester Darsteller) was an award presented at the Berlin International Film Festival from 1956 to 2020. It was given to an actor who has delivered an outstanding performance and was chosen by the International Jury from the films in the Competition slate at the festival. Beginning with the 71st Berlin International Film Festival, the award was replaced with two gender-neutral categories: the Silver Bear for Best Leading Performance and the Silver Bear for Best Supporting Performance.

At the 6th Berlin International Film Festival held in 1956, Burt Lancaster was the first winner of this award for his performance in Trapeze, and Elio Germano was the last winner in this category, for his role in Hidden Away at the 70th Berlin International Film Festival in 2020.

== History ==
The award was first presented in 1956 and can be for lead or supporting roles. The prize was not awarded on three occasions (1969, 1973, and 1974). In 1970, no awards were given as the festival was called off mid-way due to the controversy over the official selection film, o.k. by Michael Verhoeven, which led to the resignation of the international jury. In 2011, the entire male cast of A Separation received the award. Sidney Poitier, Jean Gabin, Fernando Fernán Gómez, and Denzel Washington have won the most awards in this category, each winning twice.

The last of this award was given out in 2020, after which it was replaced with two gender-neutral categories, Best Leading Performance and Best Supporting Performance, the following year.

== Winners ==
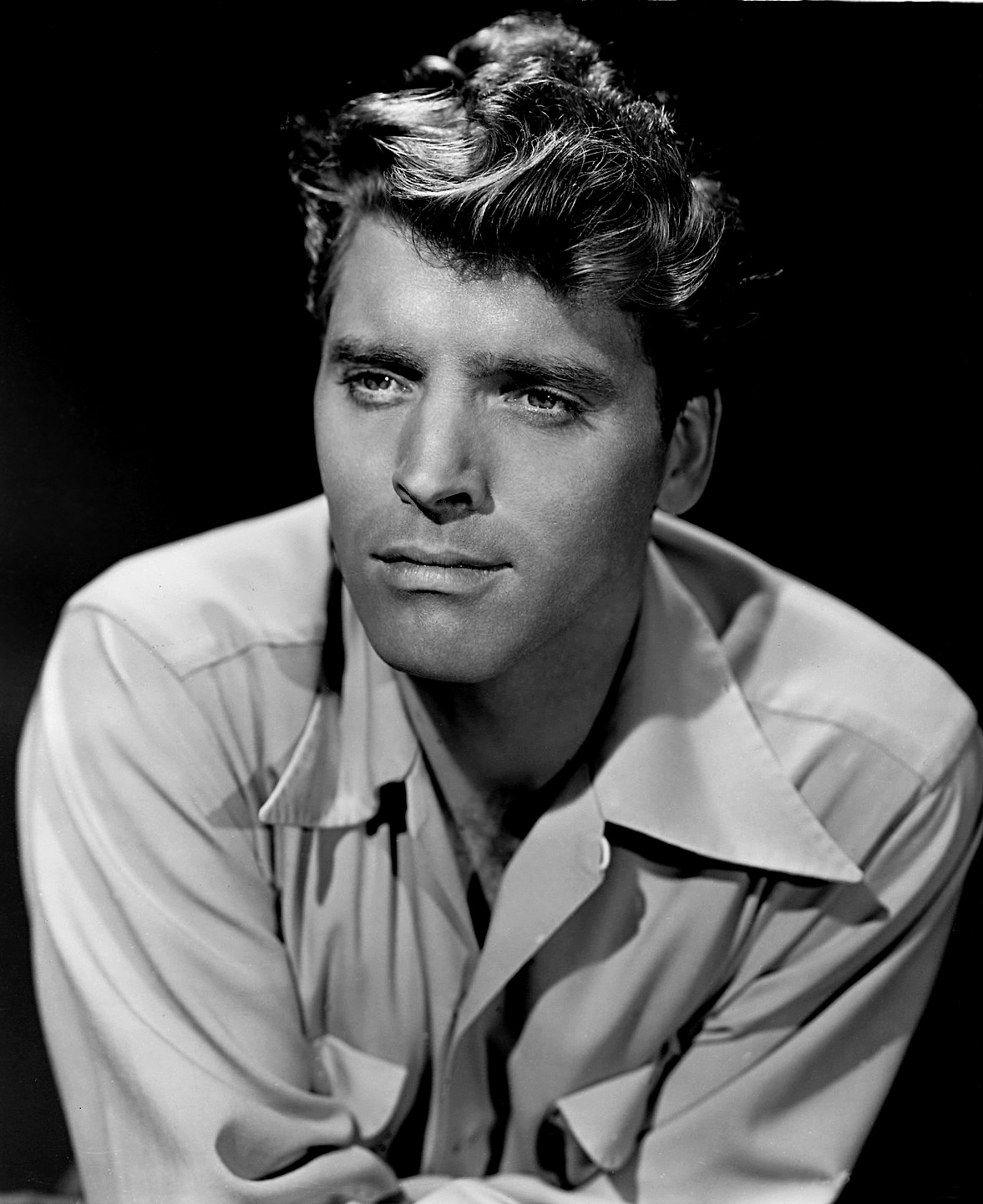
Burt Lancaster, the first winner of the Berlin Film Festival Award for Best Actor

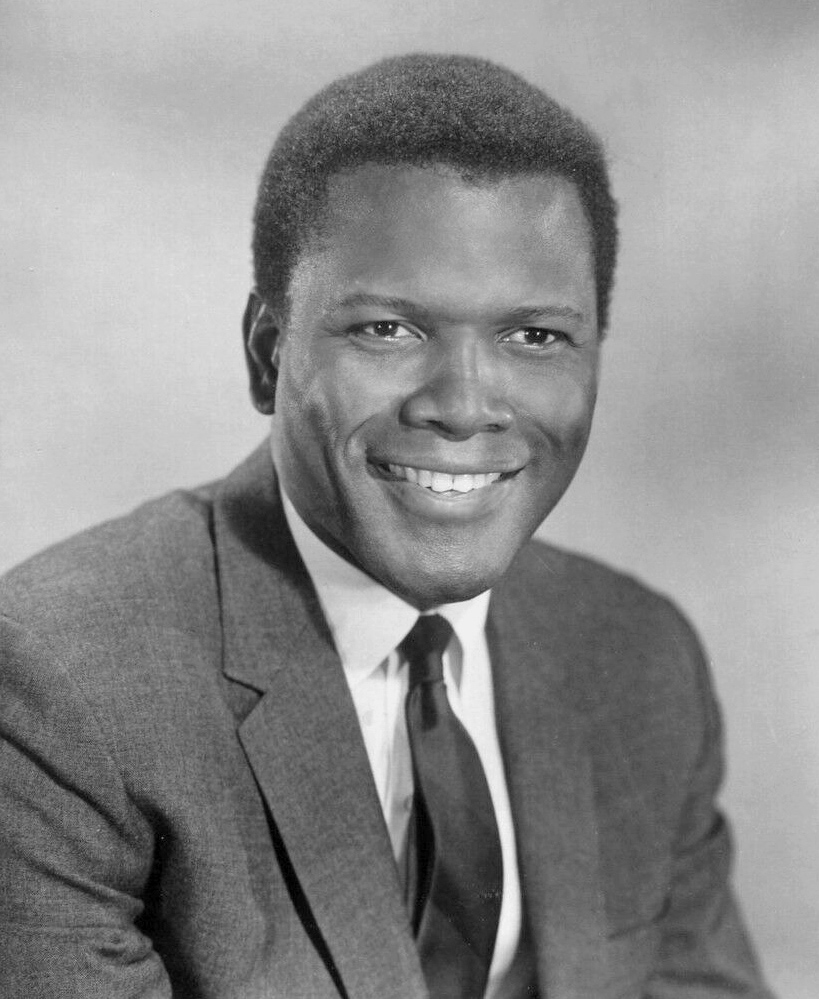
Sidney Poitier won twice for The Defiant Ones (1958) and Lilies of the Field (1963)

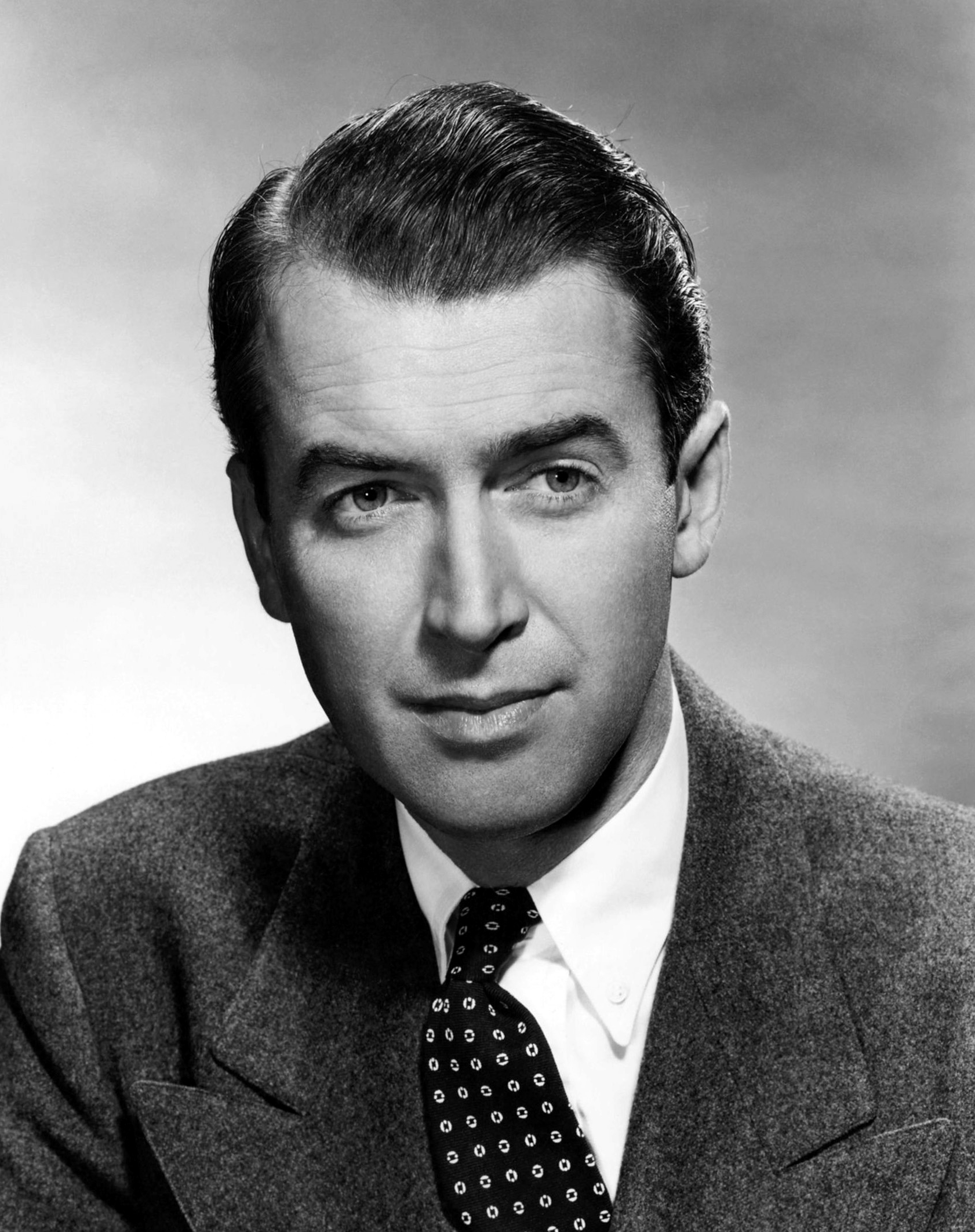
James Stewart won for Mr. Hobbs Takes a Vacation (1962)

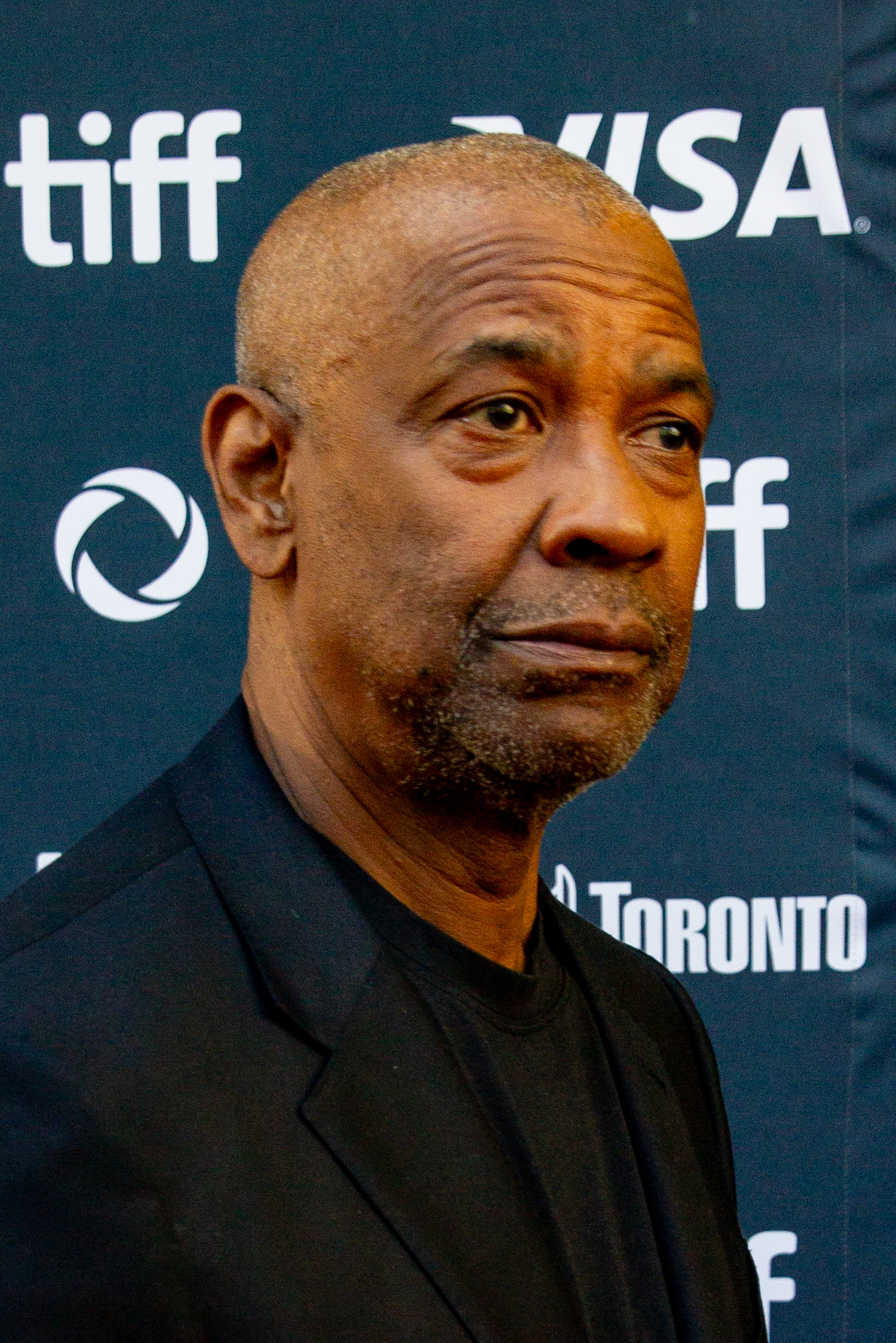
Denzel Washington won twice for Malcolm X (1993) and The Hurricane (2000)

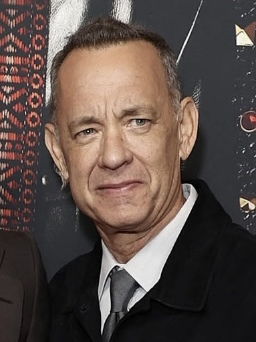
Tom Hanks won for Philadelphia (1993)

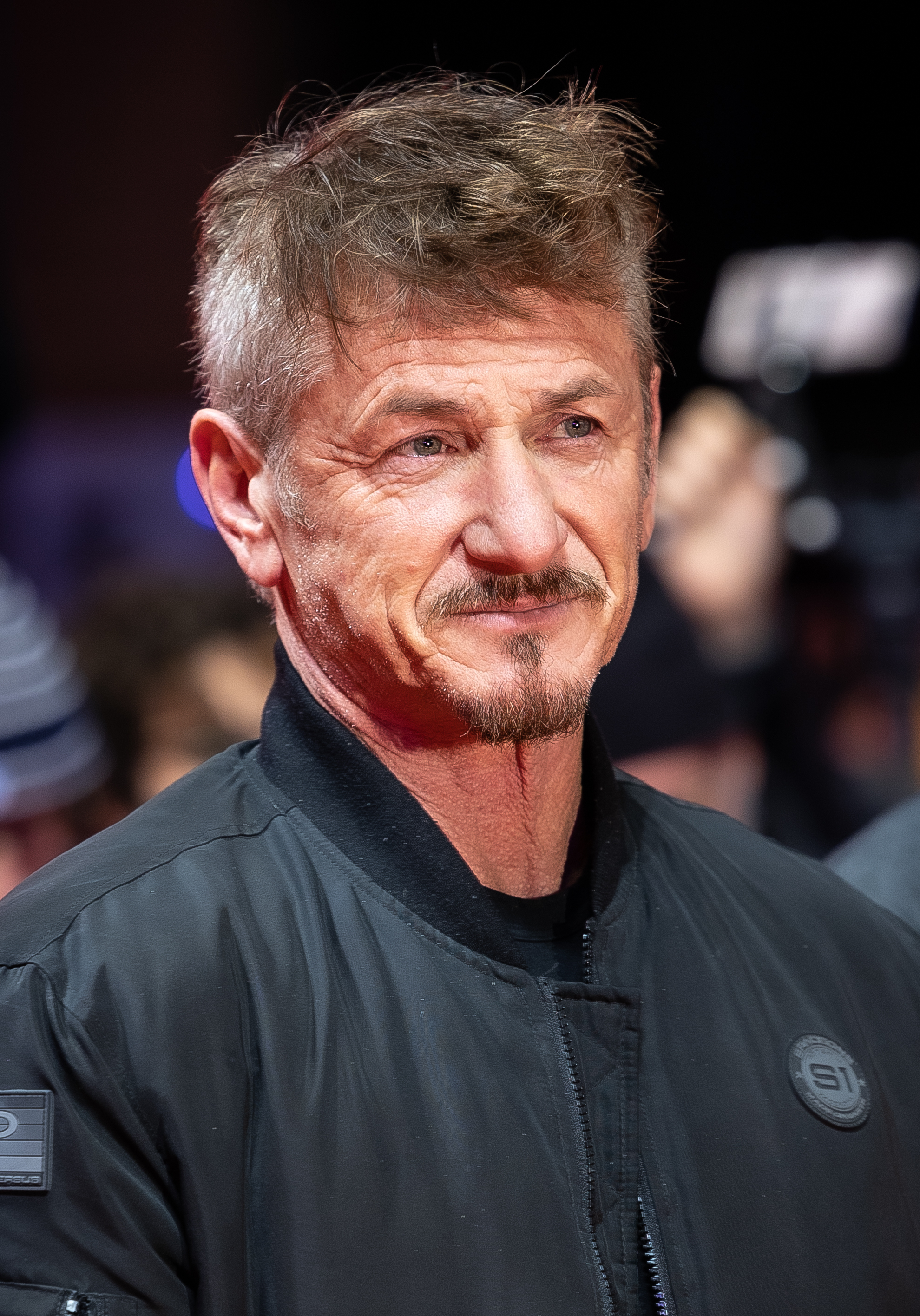
Sean Penn won for Dead Man Walking (1995)

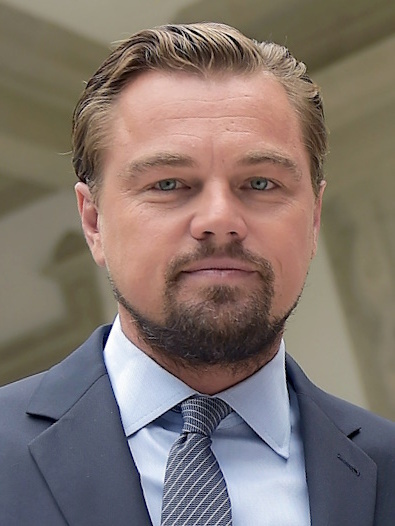
Leonardo DiCaprio won for Romeo + Juliet (1996)

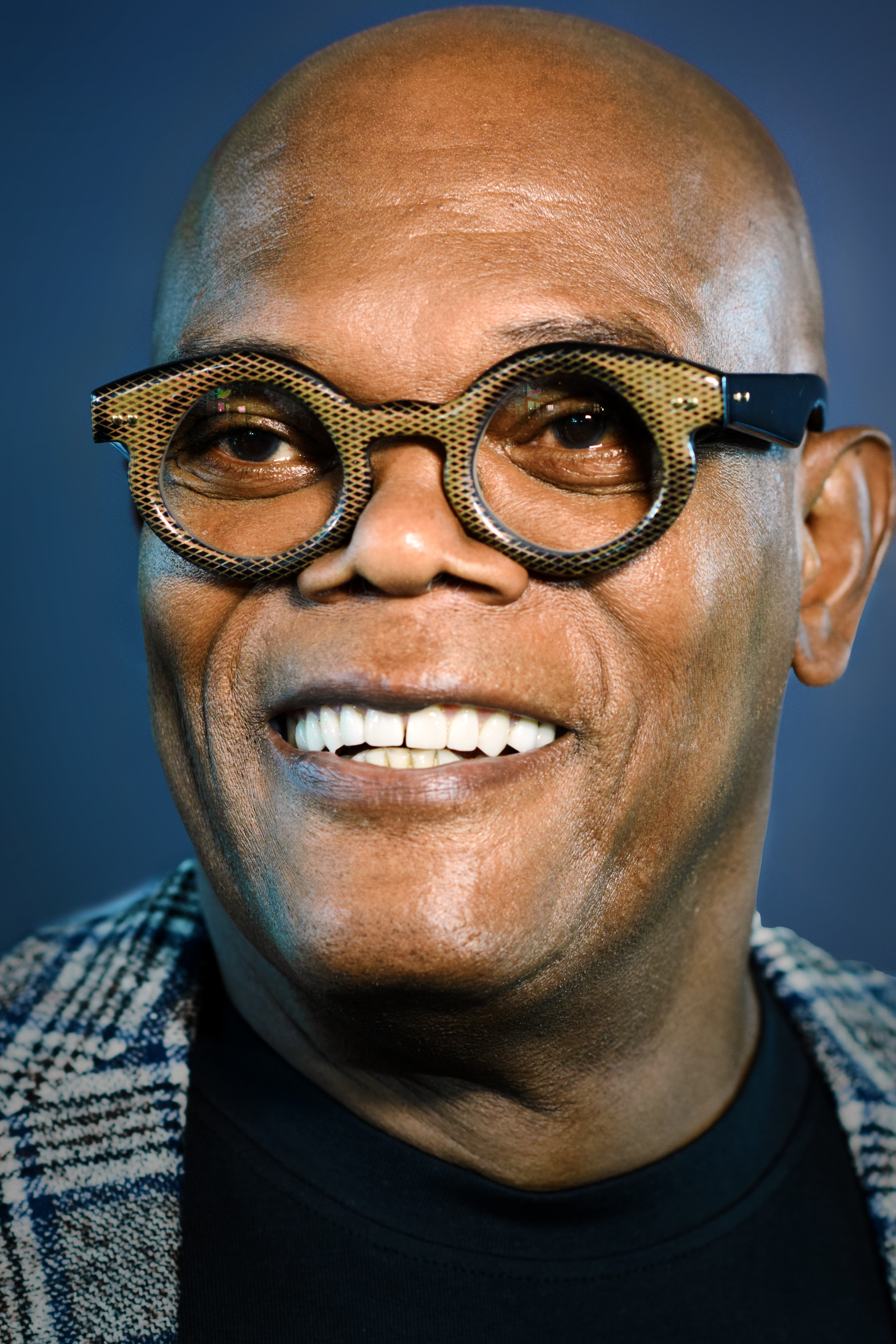
Samuel L. Jackson won for Jackie Brown (1998)

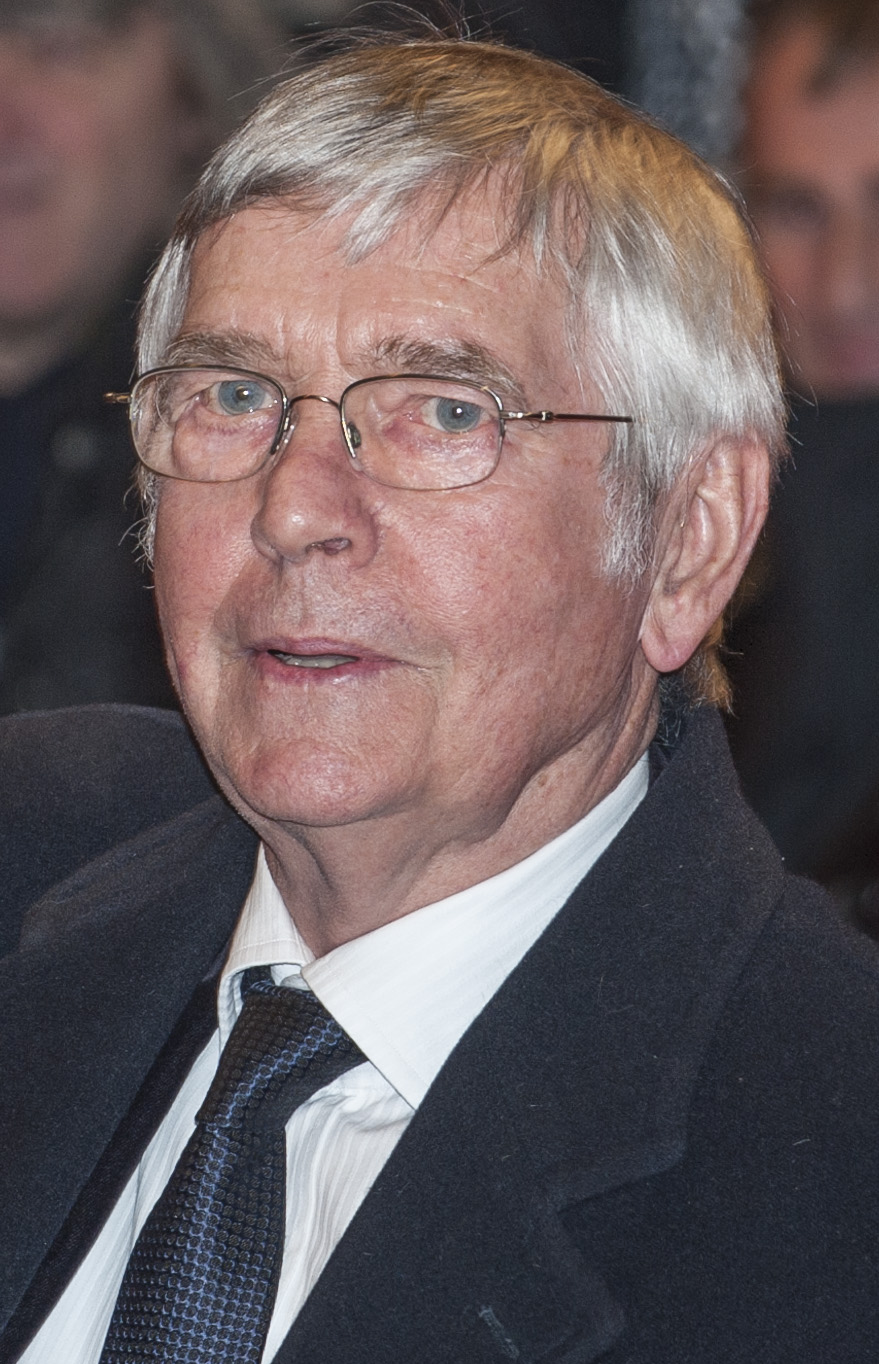
Tom Courtenay and his co-star Charlotte Rampling won for 45 Years (2015)

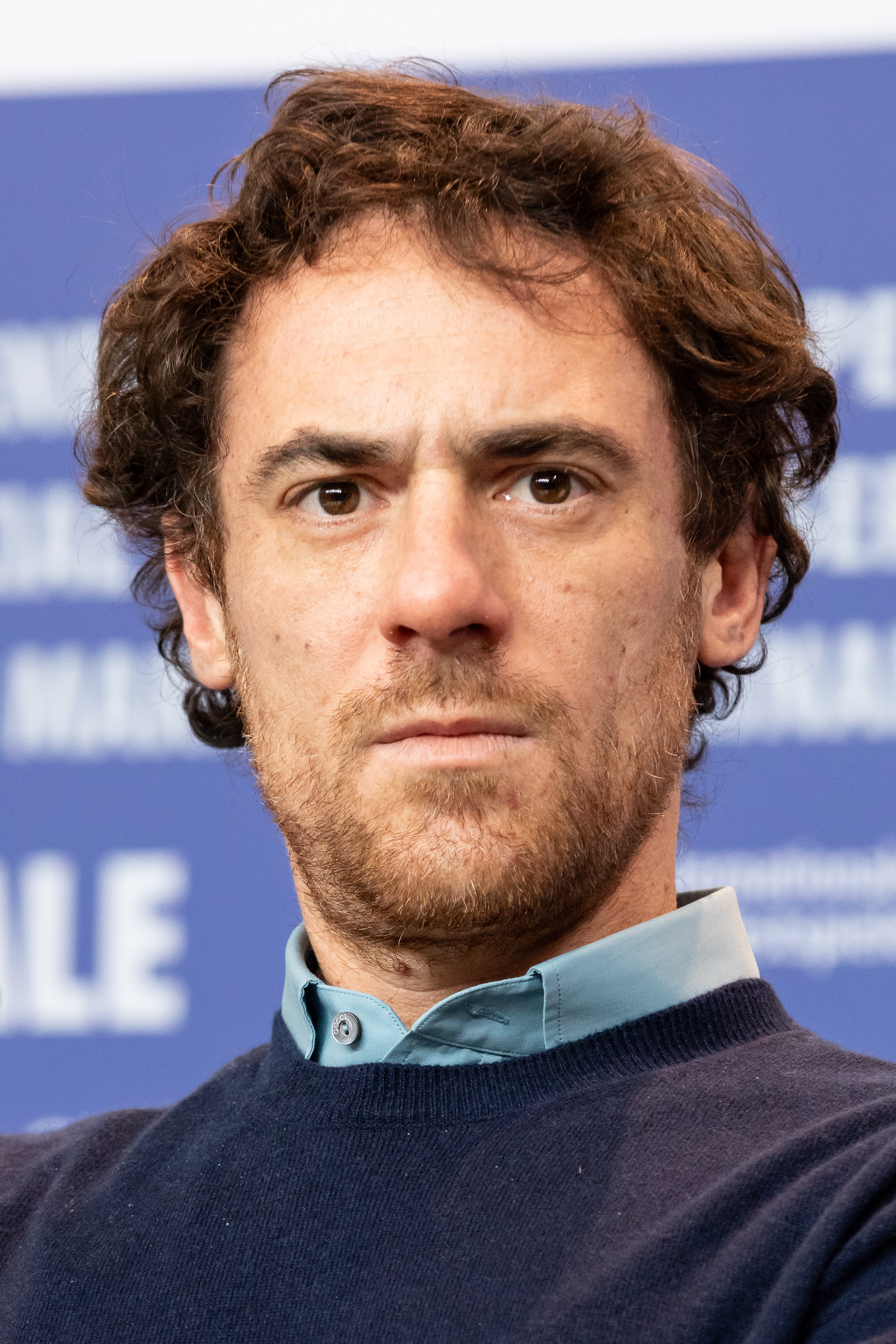
Elio Germano, the last winner of the Berlin Film Festival Award for Best Actor

=== 1950s ===
Year	Actor	Role(s)	Title	Ref.
1956	Burt Lancaster	Mike Ribble	Trapeze	
1957	Pedro Infante	Tizoc	Tizoc	
1958	Sidney Poitier	Noah Cullen	The Defiant Ones	
1959	Jean Gabin	Joseph Hughes Guillamume Boutier-Blainville / Archimède	Archimède le clochard	

=== 1960s ===
Year	Actor	Role(s)	Title	Ref.
1960	Fredric March	Matthew Harrison Brady	Inherit The Wind	
1961	Peter Finch	Johnnie Byrne	No Love for Johnnie	
1962	James Stewart	Roger Hobbs	Mr. Hobbs Takes a Vacation	
1963	Sidney Poitier	Homer Smith	Lilies of the Field	
1964	Rod Steiger	Sol Nazerman	The Pawnbroker	
1965	Lee Marvin	Kid Shellen and Tim Strawn	Cat Ballou	
1966	Jean-Pierre Léaud	Paul	Masculin Féminin	
1967	Michel Simon	Pépé	The Two of Us	
1968	Jean-Louis Trintignant	Jan Robin / Boris Varissa	The Man Who Lies	

=== 1970s ===
Year	Actor	Role(s)	Title	Ref.
1971	Jean Gabin	Julien Bouin	Le Chat	
1972	Alberto Sordi	Giusseppe Di Noi	In Prison Awaiting Trial	
1975	Vlastimil Brodský	Jakob Heym	Jacob the Liar	
1976	Gerhard Olschewski	Cioska	A Lost Life	
1977	Fernando Fernán Gómez	Fernando Tobajas	The Anchorite	
1978	Craig Russell	Robin Turner	Outrageous!	
1979	Michele Placido	The Man	Ernesto	

=== 1980s ===
Year	Actor	Role(s)	Title	Ref.
1980	Andrzej Seweryn	Adam Pietryk	The Orchestra Conductor	
1981	Jack Lemmon	Scottie Templeton	Tribute	
1981	Anatoly Solonitsyn	Fyodor Mikhailovich Dostoyevsky	Twenty Six Days from the Life of Dostoyevsky	
1982	Michel Piccoli	Bertrand Malair	Strange Affair	
1982	Stellan Skarsgård	Sven	The Simple-Minded Murderer	
1983	Bruce Dern	George Sitkowski	That Championship Season	
1984	Albert Finney	Sir	The Dresser	
1985	Fernando Fernán Gómez	Don Leopoldo Contreras de Tejada	Stico	
1986	Tuncel Kurtiz	Hilmi	The Smile of the Lamb	
1987	Gian Maria Volonté	Aldo Moro	The Moro Affair	
1988	Manfred Möck	Hubertus Koschenz	Bear Ye One Another's Burden	
1988	Jörg Pose	Josef Heiliger	Bear Ye One Another's Burden	
1989	Gene Hackman	Rupert Anderson	Mississippi Burning	

=== 1990s ===
Year	Actor	Role(s)	Title	Ref.
1990	Iain Glen	Larry Winters	Silent Scream	
1991	Maynard Eziashi	Mister Johnson	Mister Johnson	
1992	Armin Mueller-Stahl	Baron Kaspar Joachim von Utz	Utz	
1993	Denzel Washington	Malcolm X	Malcolm X	
1994	Tom Hanks	Andrew Beckett	Philadelphia	
1995	Paul Newman	Donald Sullivan	Nobody's Fool	
1996	Sean Penn	Matthew Poncelet	Dead Man Walking	
1997	Leonardo DiCaprio	Romeo Montague	Romeo + Juliet	
1998	Samuel L. Jackson	Ordell Robbie	Jackie Brown	
1999	Michael Gwisdek	Peschke	Nightshapes	

=== 2000s ===
Year	Actor	Role(s)	Title	Ref.
2000	Denzel Washington	Rubin "Hurricane" Carter	The Hurricane	
2001	Benicio del Toro	Javier Rodriguez	Traffic	
2002	Jacques Gamblin	Jean Devaivre	Safe Conduct	
2003	Sam Rockwell	Chuck Barris	Confessions of a Dangerous Mind	
2004	Daniel Hendler	Ariel Makaroff	Lost Embrace	
2005	Lou Taylor Pucci	Justin Cobb	Thumbsucker	
2006	Moritz Bleibtreu	Bruno	Atomised	
2007	Julio Chávez	Juan Desouza	The Other	
2008	Reza Naji	Karim	The Song of Sparrows	
2009	Sotigui Kouyaté	Ousmane	London River	

=== 2010s ===
Year	Actor	Role(s)	Title	Ref.
2010	Grigoriy Dobrygin	Pavel Danilov	How I Ended This Summer	
2010	Sergei Puskepalis	Sergei Gulybin	How I Ended This Summer	
2011	Payman Maadi ^{[A]}	Nader	A Separation	
2011	Shahab Hosseini ^{[A]}	Hodjat	A Separation	
2011	Ali-Asghar Shahbazi ^{[A]}	Nader's Father	A Separation	
2011	Babak Karimi ^{[A]}	Judge	A Separation	
2012	Mikkel Boe Følsgaard	King Christian VII of Denmark	A Royal Affair	
2013	Nazif Mujić	Nazif	An Episode in the Life of an Iron Picker	
2014	Liao Fan	Zhang Zili	Black Coal, Thin Ice	
2015	Tom Courtenay	Geoff Mercer	45 Years	
2016	Majd Mastoura	Hedi	Hedi	
2017	Georg Friedrich	Michael	Bright Nights	
2018	Anthony Bajon	Thomas	The Prayer	
2019	Wang Jingchun	Liu Yaojun	So Long, My Son	

=== 2020s ===
Year	Actor	Role(s)	Title	Ref.
2020	Elio Germano	Antonio Ligabue	Hidden Away	

== Multiple winners ==
The following individuals have received multiple Best Actor awards:

Wins	Actor	Nationality	Films
2	Sidney Poitier	United States	The Defiant Ones (1958), Lilies of the Field (1963)
2	Jean Gabin	France	Archimède le clochard (1959), Le Chat (1971)
2	Fernando Fernán Gómez	Spain	The Anchorite (1977), Stico (1985)
2	Denzel Washington	United States	Malcolm X (1993), The Hurricane (2000)

== See also ==
- Cannes Film Festival Award for Best Actor
- Volpi Cup for Best Actor

== Notes ==
A: The entire male and female cast of A Separation (جدایی نادر از سیمین) was recipient of this award.
