= Christine Schorn =

German actress

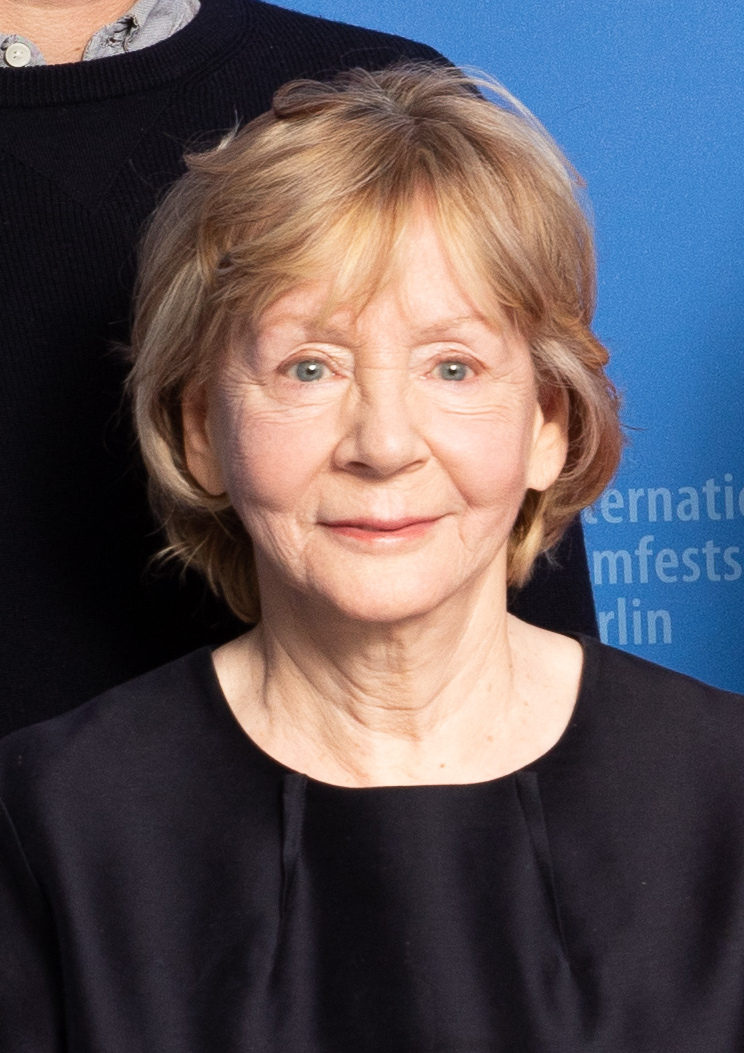
- Schorn, in 2019
- Born: 1 February 1944 (age 82)
- Occupation: Actress

Christine Schorn (born 1 February 1944) is a German actress. Schorn has appeared in multiple films and TV shows including Apprehension (1982), According to the Plan (2007) and Das Leben ist nichts für Feiglinge (2012).

== Filmography ==
- Apprehension (1982)
- Ernst Thälmann (1986 TV film)
- Good Bye, Lenin! (2003)
- According to the Plan (2007)
- Life Is Not for Cowards (2012)
- Someday We'll Tell Each Other Everything (2023)
