= Apprehension (film) =

- Directed by: Lothar Warneke
- Written by: Lothar Warneke; Helga Schubert
- Starring: Christine Schorn
- Cinematography: Thomas Plenert
- Edited by: Erika Lehmphul
- Music by: César Franck
- Release date: 1982
- Country: East Germany
- Language: German

Apprehension (German: Die Beunruhigung) is a 1982 East German drama film written and directed by Lothar Warneke and starring Christine Schorn.

The film was entered into the main competition at the 39th edition of the Venice Film Festival.

== Cast ==
- Christine Schorn as Inge Herold
- Hermann Beyer as Dieter Schramm
- Wilfried Pucher as Joachim
- Mike Lepke as Mike
- Christoph Engel as Mann in Beratungsstelle
- Sina Fiedler as Frau in Beratungsstelle
- Cox Habbema as Brigitte
- Jörg Hermann as Fürsorger
- Traute Sense as Inges Mutter
