= Manfred Möck =

German actor

- Born: 14 February 1959 (age 67); Sangerhausen, East Germany
- Occupation: Actor
- Years active: 1982–present

Manfred Möck (born 14 February 1959) is a German actor. He has appeared in over 80 films and television shows since 1982. He starred in the 1988 film Bear Ye One Another's Burden and with co-star Jörg Pose, won the Silver Bear for Best Actor at the 38th Berlin International Film Festival.

== Selected filmography ==
- Bear Ye One Another's Burden (1988)
