= Anna Geifman =

American historian (born 1962)

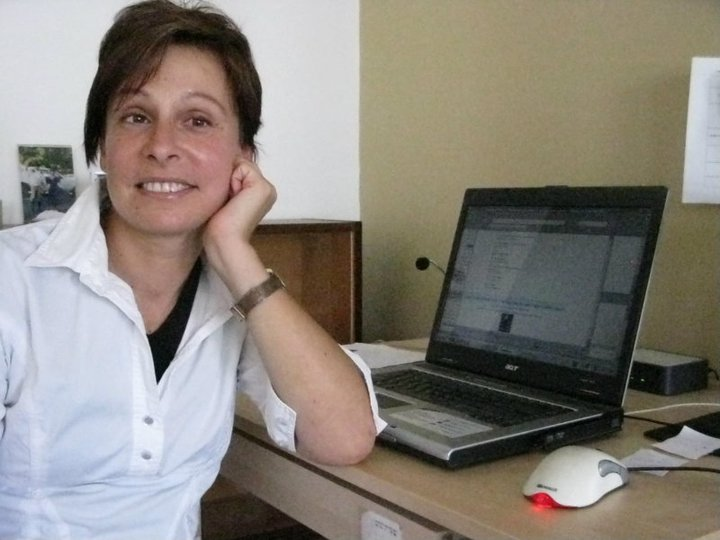
- Born: October 31, 1962; Leningrad, Soviet Union
- Citizenship: United States, Israel
- Education: Boston University, Harvard University
- Known for: origins of terrorism, history of Russian revolutionary movements
- Spouse: Divorced
- Scientific career
- Fields: History
- Workplaces: Boston University, Bar-Ilan University
- Doctoral advisor: Richard Pipes

Anna Geifman is an American historian. Her fields of interest include political extremism, terrorism, and the history of Russian revolutionary movements.

== Biography ==
Geifman was born in 1962 in Leningrad, Soviet Union, and moved to Boston, Massachusetts, with her parents in 1976. She received her BA from Boston University in 1984 and her PhD from Harvard University in 1990 under Professor Richard Pipes.

She is a professor of history at Boston University, where she teaches undergraduate and graduate classes on the history of imperial Russia, the Soviet Union, psychohistory, and modern terrorism.

Geifman researches and writes on 20th- and 21st-century fundamentalist terrorism, emphasizing psychological patterns of political violence through comparative analysis. As a psychohistorian, she focuses on incentives for extremist behavior and the impact of organized brutality on the daily lives and emotional conditions of civilians in areas that are affected by terrorism.

She has lived in Israel since 2007 and works at Bar-Ilan University.

== Intellectual positions ==
Geifman has introduced the comparison between the pre-revolutionary Russian terrorist groups and the contemporary perpetrators of Islamist violence into the conversation on terrorism. She maintains that in various parts of the world, including the Middle East, the decentralized, informal network of combat cells is very much like the network of pre-revolutionary Russian terror organizations that often operated without strong connections with one another, beyond the fact that all were inspired by similar nihilist, destructive (and self-destructive) attitudes.

Geifman downplays the importance of revolutionary ideologies, focusing not on the intellectual but on the psychological aspects of terrorism, which she relates to the perpetrators' difficulties in dealing with identity crises of modernity and post-modernity. She also underscores criminal tendencies both among the Russian radicals and the contemporary terrorists worldwide.

In Geifman's opinion, the idea that taking on the responsibilities of government will moderate groups like Hamas and Hezbollah is a fallacy. A better understanding of how ideologically driven groups that use terrorism as a tactic operate may be gained by looking at the Bolshevik Revolution. She points to the parallel between Hamas’ commitment to building up its “security forces,” and the Bolshevik establishment and funding of the Cheka (first Soviet secret police, precursor to the KGB) as its first priority upon gaining power.

According to Geifman, Hamas's first victims are the Palestinian civilians, just like the earliest victims of the Bolshevik regime were its own citizens. “You want to know what happens when terrorists come to power? As soon as terrorists take control of the government, they begin building on what they had done in the underground. Look at the Bolsheviks, who were terrorists before they came to power in 1917". They used their extensive experience in violence to build a terror-based state.

== Books ==
- Thou Shalt Kill: Revolutionary Terrorism in Russia, 1894–1917. Princeton, NJ: Princeton University Press, 1993.
- Russia under the Last Tsar: Opposition and Subversion, 1894–1917. Edited volume, with introduction and one article contributed. Oxford, England: Blackwell Publishers, 1999.
- Entangled in Terror. The Azef Affair and the Russian Revolution. Wilmington, Delaware: SR Books, 2000.
- La mort sera votre dieu! Du nihilisme russe au terrorisme islamiste. Paris: La Table Ronde, 2005.
- Death Orders: The Vanguard of Modern Terrorism in Revolutionary Russia. Praeger Security International, 2010.
