= Grigory Bogrov =

Russian Jewish writer (1825–1885)

Grigory Isaakovich Bogrov (1 March, 1825 – 28 April 1885), was Russian writer and magazine editor of Jewish descent, best known for his autobiographical novel, Notes of a Jew.

== Personal ==
He married early and from his marriage he had three sons. From his autobiography, Notes of a Jew, it is known that the marriage was not happy, but for a long time he could not get a divorce. In his later years he cohabitated with a landowner's widow Koznopolyanskaya. Shortly before his death, he converted to Christianity, either in order to marry or to secure residence permit. He is a grandfather of Russian anarchist Dmitrii Bogrov, the killer of Russian prime minister Pyotr Stolypin.
