= Egor Lazarev =

Soviet politician

- Егор Егорович Лазарев
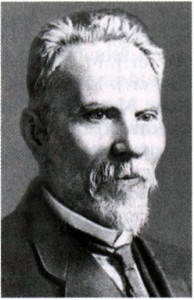
- E. E. Lazarev (ca. 1917)

Delegate of the Russian Constituent Assembly
- In office November 28, 1917 – January 5, 1918
- Preceded by: Office established
- Succeeded by: Office abolished

Minister of Education of the Committee of Members of the Constituent Assembly
- In office June 1918 – September 1918
- Preceded by: Office established

Personal details
- Born: Egor Egorovich Lazarev; 12 April 1855 Samara Governorate, Russian Empire
- Died: 23 September 1937 (aged 82) Prague, Czechoslovakia
- Party: Socialist Revolutionary Party
- Spouse: Yulia Alexandrovna

Egor Egorovich Lazarev (Russian: Его́р Его́рович Ла́зарев, pseudonym Brovinsky, April 12, 1855 – September 23, 1937) was a Russian revolutionary, populist, member of the Socialist Revolutionary Party, delegate of the Russian Constituent Assembly, Minister of Education for the Committee of Members of the Constituent Assembly, and writer.

== Life ==
Lazarev was born on April 12, 1855, in the village of Grachevka, Buzuluksky Uyezd in the Samara Governorate into a free peasant family, whose father (Yegor's grandfather) was a serf. By the time of the general abolition of serfdom, Yegor was six years old. At the age of seven he left his village to study in the Samara Parish School, and then became a participant in meetings of the Samara intelligentsia, which took place in the evenings in the sewing workshop of his aunt, Anna. In 1874 he was arrested and excluded from the Samara Gymnasium, but was later acquitted of spreading propaganda.

As part of the 159th Guriy Infantry Regiment, Lazarev participated in the Russo-Turkish War (1877–1878), participated in the Battle of Kars. In 1880 he became a non-commissioned officer and met with Leo Tolstoy. In 1884, Lazarev was arrested for participating in the Narodnaya Volya military organization, and was visited by Tolstoy in Butyrka prison. Lazarev was administratively exiled to the Trans-Baikal village of Tataurovskoe for three years. Lazarev was released on July 8, 1887, with the prohibition of residing in a number of cities of the Russian Empire. He returned to his native village, but a year later, on February 19, 1888, was again arrested in Buzuluk because of his links with Narodnaya Volya.

In August 1888, Lazarev was again exiled to Eastern Siberia for five years, but already on July 4, 1890, having met American explorer George Kennan, escaped and emigrated to the United States. In the US, he learned English and worked as a typesetter in Milwaukee. He worked with Kennan on a book and was involved in the Society of Friends of Russian Freedom. In 1894 he moved to London to unite isolated revolutionary groups. At the station, he was met by Nikolai Tchaikovsky.

Lazarev then went to Paris, but under pressure from the Russian authorities, he was arrested and expelled from France on July 12, 1894. In the summer of 1895, Lazarev moved to Switzerland, where he married Yulia Alexandrovna Lakier, and settled in the town of Clarens.

During the 1905 Russian Revolution, Lazarev was in Russia, was a member of the Peasant Commission under the Central Committee of the Socialist Revolutionary Party and was one of the experts of the Social Revolutionary group at the Second Duma, but in 1907 he again left for Switzerland. In 1909, Lazarev returned to St. Petersburg, where he began working as a secretary for the editors of the Knowledge Herald magazine. In 1910 he was arrested and for the third time exiled to Siberia. Lazarev returned to Russia in 1917 where he witnessed Lenin's arrival by train.

He did not accept the October Revolution, however, and struggled against the Bolsheviks. He became Minister of Education in the Committee of Members of the Constituent Assembly in Samara Governorate. In 1919 he left Russia for Prague, where he published the journal Volya Rossii (The Will of Russia). He died in Prague in 1937.
