= Cox Habbema =

Dutch actress (1944–2016)

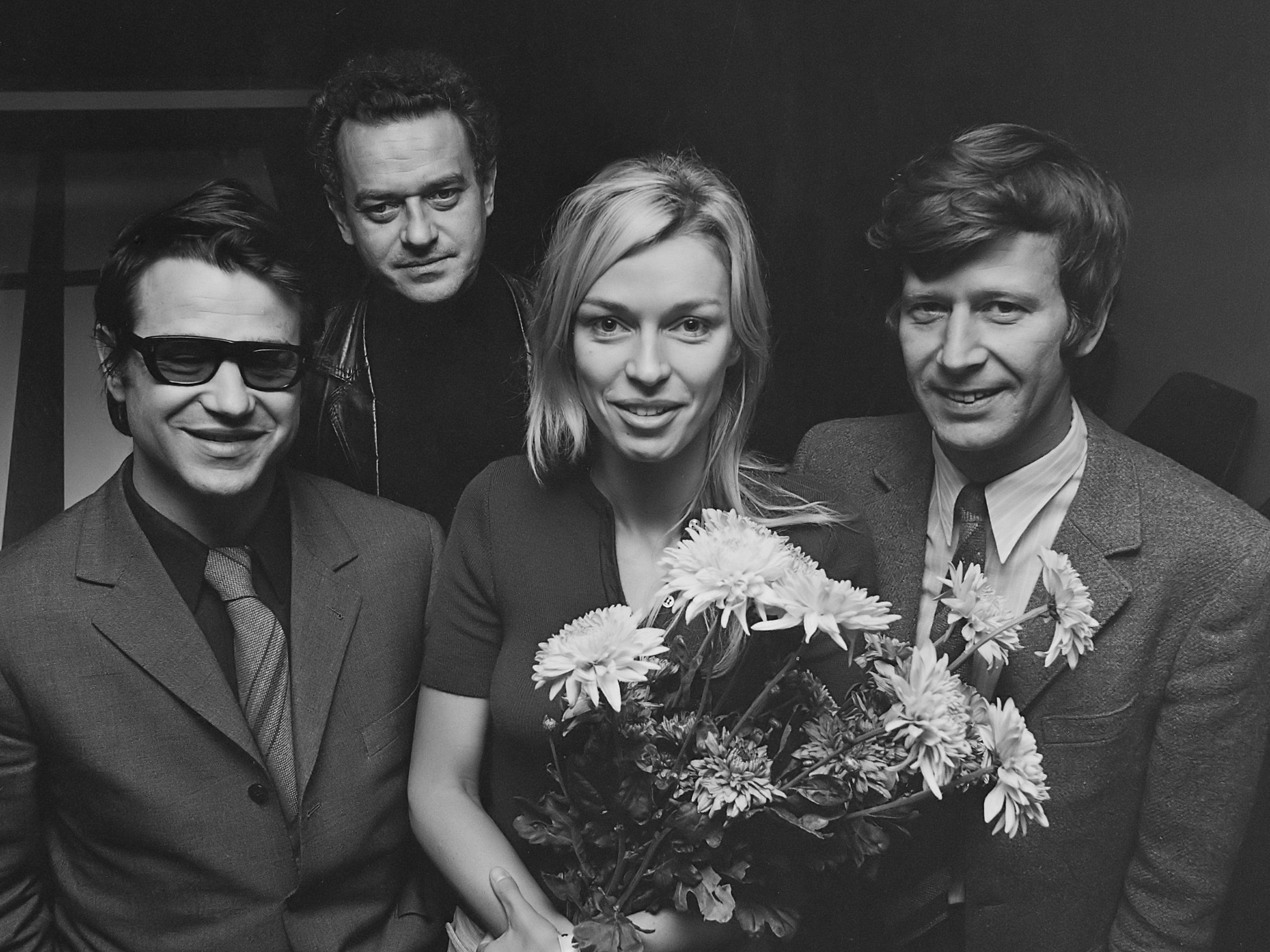
- Born: Cornelia Habbema; 21 March 1944; Amsterdam, North Holland, Netherlands
- Died: 18 April 2016 (aged 72); Amsterdam, North Holland, Netherlands
- Occupation: Actress
- Years active: 1966–2016

Cornelia "Cox" Habbema (21 March 1944 – 18 April 2016) was a Dutch film and television actress. From 1968 to 1984, she played in films for the East-German filmproduction DEFA. She was married to the actor Eberhard Esche.

== Selected filmography ==
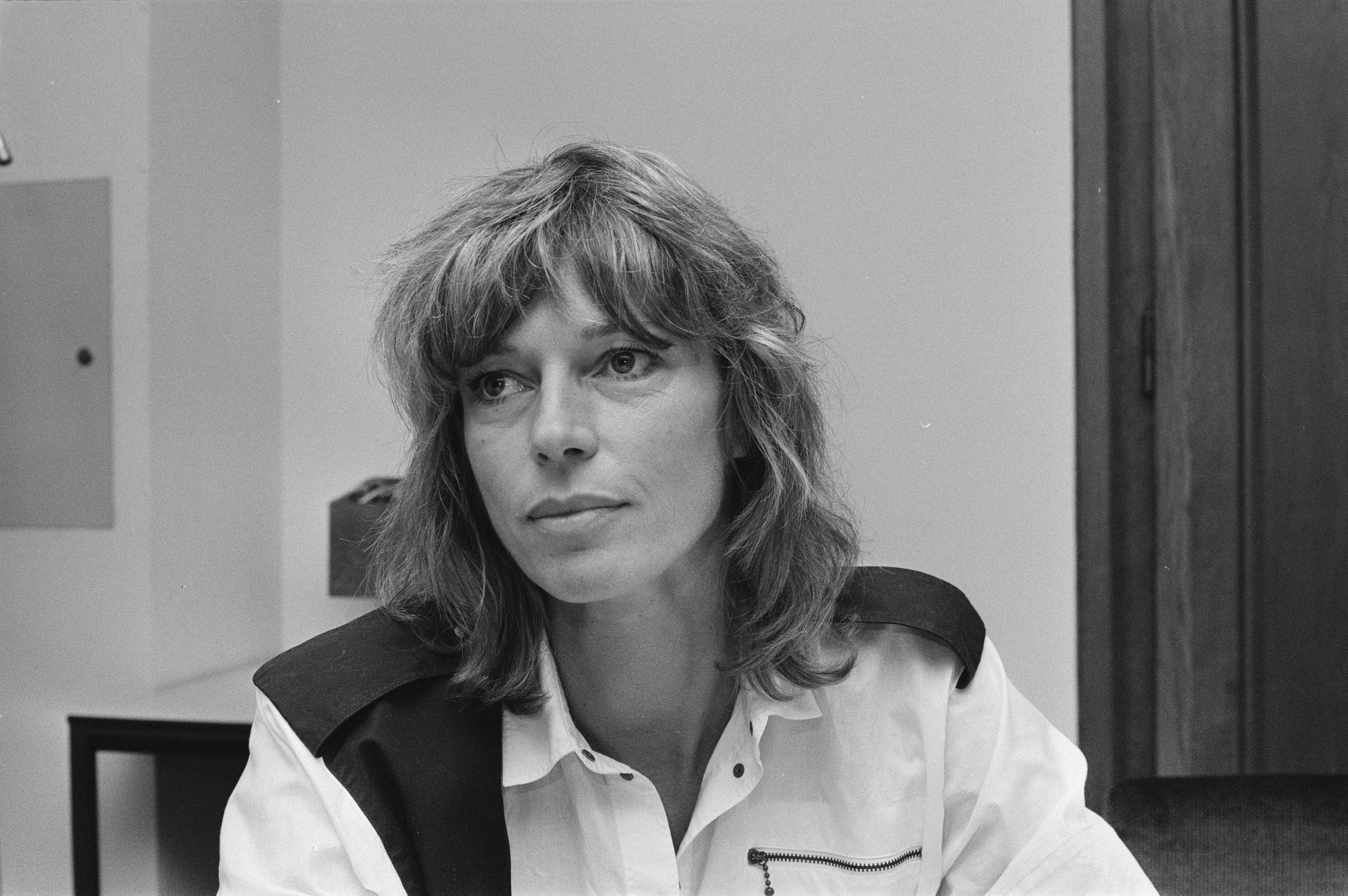
Habbema (1986)

- To Grab the Ring (1968)
- Eolomea (1972)
- The Incorrigible Barbara (1977)
- Apprehension (1982)
- A Question of Silence (1982)

== Bibliography ==
- Goble, Alan. The Complete Index to Literary Sources in Film. Walter de Gruyter, 1999.
