= Victoria Khiterer =

American historian

Victoria Khiterer (born 1968) is Professor of history at Millersville University, Pennsylvania, Adjunct Professor at Gratz College, and a founding member of the Academic Council of the Babyn Yar Holocaust Memorial Center in Kyiv, Ukraine

Khiterer, is an author and editor of eight books and over a hundred articles on Ukrainian, Russian and Modern European Jewish History. The focus of Khiterer's research is the history of Jews in Kiev and Ukraine. Her book "Bitter War of Memory: The Babyn Yar Massacre, Aftermath, and Commemoration" (Purdue University Press, 2025) discusses the Babyn Yar massacre and its aftermath, and examines the commemoration and memorialization of the Holocaust at Babyn Yar, Kyiv.

Khiterer's monograph "Jewish City or Inferno of Russian Israel? A History of the Jews in Kiev before February 1917" (Academic Studies Press, 2016) describes the history of Jews in Kiev, from the tenth century until the collapse of the monarchy in Russia.

Khiterer, is the author of a book and several articles on Jewish programs in the Russian Empire and during the civil war in Ukraine. Her book Jewish Pogroms in Kiev during the Russian Civil War, 1918–1920.

Khiterer, has published several articles on Jewish-gentile relations in the Soviet Union, anti-Semitism, the contributions of Jews to Soviet popular culture, and Jewish religious life.

Khiterer, edited three volumes of Millersville University conference proceedings: "Aftermath of the Holocaust and Genocides" (Cambridge Scholars Publishing, 2020),; "Holocaust Resistance in Europe and America: New Aspects and Dilemmas" (Cambridge Scholars Publishing, 2017), and "The Holocaust: Memories and History" (Cambridge Scholars Publishing, 2014).

== Writing ==
=== Books ===
- Bitter War of Memory: The Babyn Yar Massacre, Aftermath, and Commemoration (Purdue University Press, 2025).
- Editor, Aftermath of the Holocaust and Genocides (Newcastle upon Tyne, UK: Cambridge Scholars Publishing, 2020).
- Editor, Holocaust Resistance in Europe and America: New Aspects and Dilemmas (Newcastle upon Tyne, UK: Cambridge Scholars Publishing, 2017), 240 pp.
- Jewish City or Inferno of Russian Israel? A History of the Jews in Kiev before February 1917 (Boston: Academic Studies Press, 2016), 492 pp.
- Jewish Pogroms in Kiev during the Russian Civil War, 1918–1920 (Lewiston, Lampeter: The Edwin Mellen Press, 2015), 144 pp.
- Editor, The Holocaust: Memories and History (Newcastle upon Tyne, UK: Cambridge Scholars Publishing, 2014), 415 pp.
- Dokumenty po evreiskoi istorii XVI-XX vekov v kievskikh arkhivakh. [Jewish Documents in Kiev's Archives, (Sixteenth – Twentieth Century)] (Moscow, Kiev: Gesharim Publishing House and Institute of Jewish Studies, 2001), 223 pp.
- Dokumenty, sobrannye Evreiskoi Istoriko-arheographicheskoi komissiei Vseukrainskoi Akademii Nauk. [Collection of Documents of the Historical-Archaeographical Commission of the All-Ukrainian Academy of Sciences]. (Jerusalem, Kiev: The Hebrew University of Jerusalem and Gesharim Publishing House, 1999), 299 pp.

=== Selected Peer-Reviewed Articles ===
- "In the Shadow of Babyn Yar: Anatoly Kuznetsov's Eyewitness Account of the Betrayal and Rescue of Jews during the Holocaust in Kyiv," Eastern European Holocaust Studies, 2023-01-20 (online), DOI: 10.1515/eehs-2022-0013.
- "Unwelcome Return Home: Jews, anti-Semitism and the Housing Problem in Post-war Kyiv," Eastern European Holocaust Studies, https://doi.org/10.1515/eehs-2022-0001. Published online in October 2022.
- "Jewish Education in the Ukrainian People's Republic," Harvard Ukrainian Studies, Volume 38, no. 3–4 (2021): 271–295.
- "The Holodomor and Jews in Kyiv and Ukraine: An introduction and observations on a neglected topic" Nationalities Papers, 48, no. 3 (2020).
- "How Jews Gained Their Education in Kiev," Polin: Studies in Polish Jewry, 30 (2018): 155–179.
- "Seekers of Happiness: Jews and Jazz in the Soviet Union," Kultura Popularna, 1, no. 51 (2017): 26–50.
- "The October 1905 Pogroms and the Russian Authorities," Nationalities Papers. The Journal of Nationalism and Ethnicity, 43, no. 5 (2015): 788–803.
- "Jews in Soviet Cinema: The Film Commissar by Aleksandr Askol'dov," Shofar: An Interdisciplinary Journal of Jewish Studies, 33.1 (2014): 1-29.
- "We Did Not Recognize Our Country: The Rise of Anti-Semitism in Ukraine Before and After World War II (1937-1947)," Polin: Studies in Polish Jewry, 26 (2014): 361–379.
- "The Jewish Songs of Leonid Utesov," On the Jewish Street, 2, no. 1 (2012): 1–48.
- On the Jewish Street, 1, no. 2 (2011): 1-25.
- "The Brodsky Sugar Kings: Jewish Industrialists, Philanthropists and Community Leaders of Late Imperial Russia" Jews and Slavs, 19 (2008): 25–41.- "Jewish Life in Kyiv at the Turn of the Twentieth Century." Ukraina Moderna, 10, (2006): 74–94.
- "Arnold Davidovich Margolin: Ukrainian-Jewish Jurist, Statesman and Diplomat," Revolutionary Russia, 18, no. 2 (2005): 145–167.
