= Odermatt =

Odermatt is a Swiss surname. Notable people with the surname include:

- Arnold Odermatt (1925–2021), Swiss police photographer
- Joseph Odermatt, Palmarian Catholic church Pope known as Peter III
- Karl Odermatt (born 1942), Swiss former footballer
- Marco Odermatt (born 1997), Swiss alpine ski racer
- Urs Odermatt (born 1955), Swiss film director and author
- Vanessa Odermatt (born 1990), German politician
