= Die Zähmung der Hydra =

2012 album by Shaban & Käptn Peng

Studio album by Shaban & Käptn Peng
- Released: April 2012
- Genre: German hip-hop
- Length: 68:37
- Language: German
- Label: Kreismusik

Käptn Peng chronology
| Die Zähmung der Hydra (2012) | Expedition ins O (2013) |

Die Zähmung der Hydra is a 2012 German hip-hop album by Shaban & Käptn Peng. It was released in April 2012 by the independent label Kreismusik. It was the duo's only album, though they went on to produce two other albums in 2013 and 2017 as the band Käptn Peng & Die Tentakel von Delphi. The album received praise for its themes and wordplay.

== Background and production ==
The album was created by brothers Käptn Peng, real name Robert Gwisdek, and his brother Shaban, real name Johannes Gwisdek. They are the sons of actors Corinna Harfouch and Michael Gwisdek. Robert Gwisdek also worked as an actor. Johannes Gwisdek was then a full time musician, with experience in music creation for plays and movies, and DJing.

The brothers had made music together for the preceding three years. Before the album's release, Robert Gwisdek had moved out of Berlin to his parents' more rural home; there, he began to create rhymes about the forest creatures he saw. He set these rhymes to "fiddly computer beats", and showed them to his brother. Robert Gwisdek later stated that at that moment they realized they should do music together.

== Composition and themes ==
The beats for the album were created by Shaban, with the rapping done by Peng. In an interview with the German newspaper Die Tageszeitung, Robert Gwisdek denied the album was rap and that he was a rapper or that it was hip-hop, saying instead that he merely sung faster than average, criticizing the typical perception of what hip hop is thematically. He said he rapped about what concerned him, particularly psychological topics; he called this a form of therapy for him, saying that rapping helped him to sort out the madness in his life. He also stated that he did not want anyone to take any messages away from his lyrics, and that it was not important what he had to say.

Zitty said that in making it Peng showed influence from Eminem in the usage of "paranoid role-playing" elements, and also the flow of the rapper Nelly; however they described the album as a whole as original and free of large influence from other musicians. The album explores in its lyrics the psyche of Peng, and contains "lyrical research trips into German semantics", or philosophical themes. In one track, they rap about two lovers who successively transform into different kinds of animals, first foxes and then albatrosses and pelicans.

== Release ==
The album was released in April 2012 by their independent label Kreismusik; it was the label's first release. They turned down offers from record companies in doing this, saying that it was for fun and should stay that way and they did not want to have to go along with the orders from the record companies. Prior to its release the two brothers created some internet interest in the album through videos the duo posted online to YouTube, resulting in the video becoming popular online. The album received little actual promotion otherwise and got little attention from mainstream newspapers.

Following its release, they released music as Käptn Peng & Die Tentakel von Delphi, who they had performed as prior. This band involved other musicians and not only the two brothers. As Käptn Peng & Die Tentakel von Delphi they released another album a year later with a different approach, Expedition ins O, which received more attention.

== Reception ==
Professional ratings
Review scores
| Source | Rating |
|---|---|
| Musikexpress | 5/6 stars |

Thomas Winkler of Musikexpress gave the album 5 out of 6 stars. As standout tracks he named "Werbistich" and "Parantatatam". Zitty praised it as a great debut, and said of the album that there was much depth behind the "catchy, lively music". Die Tageszeitung said of the album that the lyrics showed Peng "tr[ying] to explore the labyrinthine states in his brain in seemingly endless but always rhythmic monologues full of wit and linguistic power".

Winkler said the album proved that "intelligent German rap is possible, contrary to expectations." He praised the album as "play[ing] with the German language in a way that is as eloquent, funny and full of enthusiasm as one has not heard for far too long". He complimented the flow and broader range of thematic topics compared to other German rappers Maeckes and Cro, instead of "rapping about rapping". Winkler said they were not "breaking new ground, but they are bringing greenery to a devastated wasteland."

== Track listing ==
Die Zähmung der Hydra
| No. | Title | Length |
|---|---|---|
| 1. | "Sein Name sei Peng" | 5:47 |
| 2. | "OHA" | 4:22 |
| 3. | "Kampf mit der Hydra" | 6:38 |
| 4. | "Sie mögen sich" | 6:52 |
| 5. | "Parantatatam" | 4:00 |
| 6. | "Die Störung" | 4:20 |
| 7. | "Haus brennt" | 4:23 |
| 8. | "werbistich" | 6:25 |
| 9. | "Anfangen Aufhören Auffangen Anhören" | 3:10 |
| 10. | "Keine Ahnung" | 4:09 |
| 11. | "Kündigung 2.0" | 3:07 |
| 12. | "Flotten von Mutanten" | 4:12 |
| 13. | "Von Form zu Form" | 3:34 |
| 14. | "Der Stein des Wahnsinns" | 4:23 |
| 15. | "Alles ist Käptn" | 3:06 |
| Total length: | | 1:08:37 |
