= Gwisdek =

Gwisdek is a German surname. Notable people with the surname include:

- Michael Gwisdek (1942–2020), German actor and film director
- Robert Gwisdek (born 1984), German actor and musician
