= Das nullte Kapitel =

2017 album by Käptn Peng & Die Tentakel von Delphi

- Album cover

Studio album by Käptn Peng & Die Tentakel von Delphi
- Released: 19 May 2017
- Genre: German hip-hop
- Length: 61:23
- Language: German
- Label: Kreismusik

Käptn Peng chronology
| Expedition ins O (2013) | Das nullte Kapitel (2017) |

Das nullte Kapitel is a 2017 German hip-hop album by Käptn Peng & Die Tentakel von Delphi. It is the second album by the band, following 2013's Expedition ins O. It was published by the independent label Kreismusik. The album, as with previous albums by the band, features complex, surreal and philosophical lyrics, as well as usage of unorthodox items as instruments. It received largely positive reviews from critics, with praise for its lyricism and themes.

== Background and production ==
Käptn Peng, real name Robert Gwisdek, is also an actor. His band, Käptn Peng & Die Tentakel von Delphi includes his brother, Johannes Gwisdek, or Shaban, and three other musicians. Its first album, Expedition ins O released in 2013. Shortly before this album's release, Gwisdek had provided the soundtrack to Axel Ranisch's film Alky Alky.

The album was produced in the band's Berlin studio with the help of sound engineer Jens Güttes. The band, as with previous albums, uses strange instruments, including among others, concrete buckets, baking trays, brushes, bicycle bells, and an improvised bass made of particle board. However, breaking from past albums, Das nullte Kapitel also includes usage of synthesizers.

== Composition and themes ==
The album begins with an introduction by Gwisdek, who discusses the beginning of the search for the eponymous Das nullte Kapitel. The tracks contain poetic and philosophical lyrics. Musikexpress called it "academic" in doing so, and MZEE.com further described it as being "often more reminiscent of a poetry slam than a real rap album". The lyrics are often nonsensical, with surreal metaphors. In an interview with the Austrian newspaper Kurier, he said that his words were not meant to carry, but were instead "lots and lots of mini-statements that are hidden behind the metaphors with which I express my feelings", and that he enjoyed playing with bizarre elements.

Tracks incorporate reggae beats, with rock interludes with heavy usage of guitar. Tracks are often interrupted by a cappella monologues from Gwisdek, without music. MZEE.com described it as blurring the lines between rap and pop rock. Themes explored in the album, as with previous works of Gwisdek, revolve mostly around the psyche, madness and strange monsters, but also life, love and emotions. Relative to earlier albums, themes are more focused on reality versus strictly fantastical elements and inner reality. Other subjects include Pi, dream journeys, the death of humanity, and criticism of people and society. "Im Labyrinth" involves the character of Käptn Peng being at war with his own soul, while "Tango im Schnellsand" is a love song. The final track, "Tier", explores the concept of endlessness, with most of its runtime repeating the same story.

== Release ==
The album was released 19 May 2017 by the label Kreismusik. For the release of the album, the band toured starting from the day of its release, including in Austria.

== Reception ==
Professional ratings
Review scores
| Source | Rating |
|---|---|
| Musikexpress | 5/6 stars |
| plattentests.de | 6/10 |
| Album der Woche | 8.3 / 8.5 |

Julia Lorenz, a reviewer from Musikexpress rated the album 5/6 stars, praising the instrumentation and noting its surreal and dadaist lyrics and themes. She described the album as "party-ready. Except that partying in Peng-land probably means getting lost in the Milky Way on the way to the kitchen. Or exorcising Rasputin while lucid dreaming." Plattentests.de's Pascal Bremmer gave the album a 6/10, praising its lyricism, but negatively comparing it to the previous Expedition ins O, saying it felt much longer due in part to repetitive song structure; Album der Woche also negatively compared it to the previous album, arguing some of its concepts had not been used as well here. They said that relative to the past albums, it had a more "perfect" sound, which took away some of the "naturalness and dreaminess" from it.

Album der Woche's two reviewers each gave the album an 8.3 and an 8.5 out of 10, respectively. They praised its lyrics as well as the music, saying that the great strength was Gwisdek's "ability to take everyday things and build a new world around them out of infinite brainwaves". They also noted it as easier to understand than the previous albums, with the themes focusing more on life-related things instead of purely "crazy fantasy", and pointed out "Im Labyrinth" as a track that "shows the music's full power and craziness". Bremmer also pointed out the track "Im Labyrinth" as the album's strongest, also praising "WobWobWob" and "Backpfeifenernte auf dem Alphabeet", but criticizing some tracks for lacking the "instrumental spectacle" that made the others appealing. MZEE.com praised its philosophical lyrics and musical experimentation, saying that though the album required one's full attention to be fully appreciated anyone who did so would be rewarded. Hiphop.de said it had a "spaced-out note".

== Charts ==
| Chart | Position |
|---|---|
| GfK Entertainment charts | 12 |
| Austria Top 40 (austriancharts.at) | 15 |

== Track listing ==
Das nullte Kapitel
| No. | Title | Length |
|---|---|---|
| 1. | "Das nullte Kapitel" | 1:36 |
| 2. | "Spiegelkabinett" | 5:56 |
| 3. | "Im Labyrinth" | 3:55 |
| 4. | "Neue Freunde" | 4:55 |
| 5. | "Meister und Idiot" | 5:05 |
| 6. | "WobWobWob" | 3:43 |
| 7. | "Tango im Treibsand" | 4:31 |
| 8. | "Pi" | 4:50 |
| 9. | "Pförtner" | 4:07 |
| 10. | "MC HomoSapiensSapiens" | 5:07 |
| 11. | "ABCDEFGHIJKLMNOPQRSTUVWXYZ" | 2:57 |
| 12. | "Backpfeifenernte auf dem Alphabeet" | 2:07 |
| 13. | "Gelernt" | 3:22 |
| 14. | "Todesbossa" | 3:09 |
| 15. | "Tier" | 5:03 |
| Total length: | | 61:23 |
