= Expedition ins O =

2013 album by Käptn Peng & Die Tentakel von Delphi

- Album cover

Studio album by Käptn Peng & Die Tentakel von Delphi
- Released: 12 April 2013
- Genre: German hip-hop
- Length: 61:03
- Language: German
- Label: Kreismusik

Käptn Peng chronology
Die Zähmung der Hydra (2012)	Expedition ins O (2013)	Das nullte Kapitel (2017)

Expedition ins O is a 2013 German hip-hop album by Käptn Peng & Die Tentakel von Delphi. It is the first album by the band, but Käptn Peng's second album, following his 2012 album Die Zähmung der Hydra. It was published by the independent label Kreismusik. The album features lyrics focusing on themes such as the insignificance of humanity, mental health, and the origin of everything. The album received a generally positive reception, with reviewers complimenting the wordplay and themes.

== Background and production ==
Käptn Peng, real name Robert Gwisdek, is also an actor. He had produced an album the prior year alongside his brother Johannes Gwisdek (Shaban), Die Zähmung der Hydra. Unlike their first album, Expedition ins O was created with Die Tentakel von Delphi, their live band with three others in addition to Gwisdek and his brother.

They had played live together for some time before the creation of the album. This was in contrast to the previous album, which was mostly electronically produced. In creating the album, they used both traditional instruments like bass guitars and acoustic guitars, but also buckets and suitcases.

== Composition and themes ==
The album is primarily rapped, mostly by Gwisdek. The album has a mix of genre elements; Laut.de described it as a "fusion of funk rock and alternative", while Musikexpress said it "crash[ed] between neofolk and Augsburger Puppenkiste". The tracks have complicated lyrics and bizarre wordplay, mixing up many topics.

Frankfurter Allgemeine Zeitung interpreted the album as dealing with themes of humanity's insignificance, and not merely commentary on society, but instead the universe. Musikexpress viewed it as dealing with intellectual detachment and madness, where "[h]umanity itself is only a footnote out of seven billion idiots". Instead of humanity, the topics focus more on matters of space, the universe, and many other details. They noted it as focusing on Käptn Peng's mental health as a lyrical topic. Its songs explore existential questions, with "Liebes Lebem" and "Sockosophy" exploring the story of creation, with the latter discussing the "origin of the origin of the origin". The song "Monster" focuses on fear, with the monster in question being defeated after a chaotic ending.

== Release ==
The album was released 12 April 2013 by Kreismusik. Pre-release, "Der Anfang ist nah" was released as a single, and received a music video. In performing, the band members dressed in homemade animal costumes, with performances including holograms. This album received more interest from the popular press than their prior album.

== Reception ==
Professional ratings
Review scores
Source	Rating
laut.de	4/5 stars
Musikexpress	5/6 stars
plattentests.de	8/10

Musikexpress positively reviewed the album, giving it five out of six stars, and complimenting the wordplay, calling it a "second masterpiece" from Käptn Peng. They said Gwisdek translated his own inner thoughts with "desperate wit and insane wordplay in lyrics that have never been heard in this country before, oscillating so weightlessly between wisdom and madness." Laut.de's Simon Langemann gave it four out of five stars, with the reviewer praising the album as "extremely refreshing". Frankfurter Allgemeine Zeitung said the "dilemma of German head pop" was " taken to its presumable extreme" by the album, with the "music and message are so far apart that they almost span a world and meet again at the end".

Plattentests.de's Pascal Bremmer gave it a score of 8/10, describing it as mastering "the German language in its most wonderful facets" with Gwisdek putting "words on the puppet strings", though said it was not hip hop in the traditional sense. Langemann said it was a major improvement over Die Zähmung der Hydra, particularly with the backup musicians Die Tentakel von Delphi, calling the result "wild determination and bubbling creativity" as well as "charming". Langemann specifically praised the tracks "Champagner & Schnittchen" and "U-Boot", which he described as higher energy compared to tracks like "Oha", "Absolem", "Monster" and "Liebes Leben". Musikexpress, while appreciative of the album, believed it would not appeal to the German rap scene, viewing Gwisdek as not fit for it, describing it as an album that would "not please the guardians of the hip-hop grail" in its confusion of genres. Pascal Bremmer also described the album as ostracized by the rap scene. Langemann viewed the album as not fitting the media's division of German hip hop into either "friendly hipster music" or "vulgar street rap revival".

== Charts ==
Chart	Position
GfK Entertainment charts	60

== Track listing ==
Expedition ins O
No.	Title	Length
1.	"Der Anfang ist nah"	5:12
2.	"Absolem"	3:27
3.	"Champagner & Schnittchen"	5:00
4.	"Es ist"	3:12
5.	"U-Boot"	3:28
6.	"Omega Peng"	3:55
7.	"Monster"	4:03
8.	"Platz da"	4:43
9.	"Die Tentakel von Delphi"	1:55
10.	"Liebes Leben"	2:48
11.	"Sockosophie"	7:07
12.	"Unten"	5:02
13.	"1234PengPengPeng"	1:42
14.	"Oha"	5:19
15.	"Kugelschlucker"	3:23
Total length:		61:03
