= Fallada =

Fallada may refer to:

- Hans Fallada, born: Rudolf Wilhelm Friedrich Ditzen (1893–1947), German writer
  - Hans Fallada Prize (German: der Hans-Fallada-Preis, German literary prize given by the city of Neumünster
  - 14025 Fallada, main-belt asteroid
- Fallada: The Last Chapter, 1988 German film
