= Stefan Walz =

Swiss film actor

Stefan Walz (born 1963) is a Swiss actor. His best known role is as a Sigmund Jähn-lookalike in the film Good Bye, Lenin!.

== Biography ==
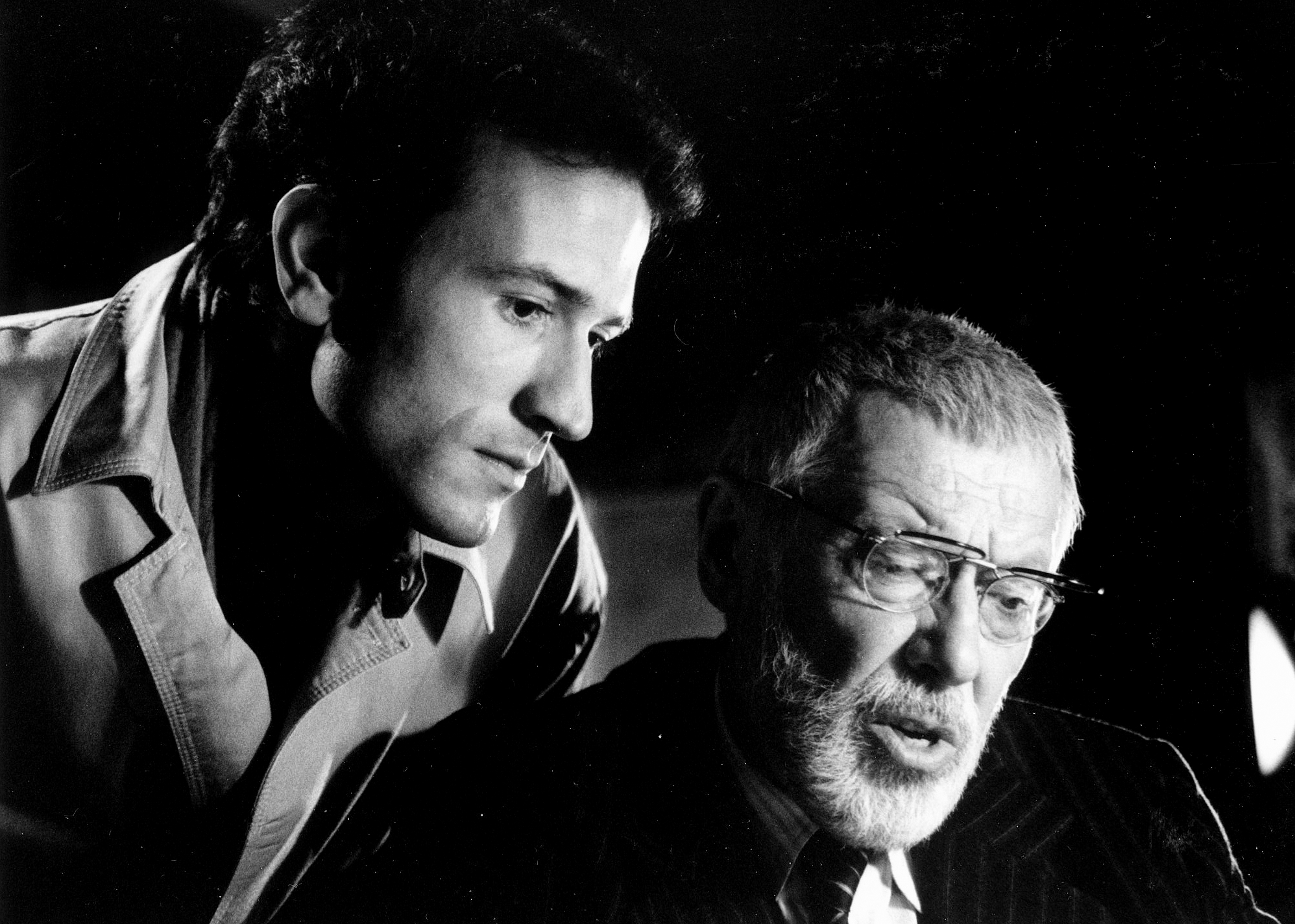
Stefan Walz (left), Dietmar Schönherr (right) in Der Tod zu Basel (1992) by Urs Odermatt

Stefan Walz studied acting at the Konservatorium Bern. He worked at the kleines theater – Kammerspiele Landshut from 1992 to 1998 and was part of the founding company of the Kammerspiele Landshut. From 1998 to 2006 he had diverse roles in Essen, Munich and Hamburg. He has been at the Staatstheater Mainz since 2006.

In addition to his acting career, he is involved in various jazz and rock groups, playing a variety of instruments such as the guitar, bass, banjo and mandolin. His hobbies are skiing and martial arts.

He currently lives in Mainz.

== Filmography ==
- Der Tod zu Basel, Director: Urs Odermatt (1992)
- Für alle Fälle Stefanie, television series (1995, 1999–2001)
- Der Räuber mit der sanften Hand (1996)
- Fieber, television series (1996)
- Die Krauses (1997)
- Du hast mir meine Familie geraubt (1998)
- Julia – Kämpfe für deine Träume! (1998)
- Die Kommissarin: Bitteres Ende (2001)
- Fertig Lustig (2001)
- Der letzte Zeuge (2001)
- Good Bye, Lenin! (2003)
