= OHA =

The acronym OHA may refer to:

- On hand Always
- DHS Office of Health Affairs, an office in the United States Department of Homeland Security
- Oakland Heritage Alliance, a non-profit preservation organization in Oakland, California.
- Oakland Housing Authority
- Office of Hawaiian Affairs
- Office of Hearings and Appeals, within the US Small Business Administration
- Office of Human Affairs, a Community Action Agency serving the residents of Newport News and Hampton, Virginia.
- Oklahoma Hospital Association, the state affiliate of the American Hospital Association
- Omaha Housing Authority, the government agency responsible for providing public housing in Omaha, Nebraska, USA
- Ontario Hockey Association, which governs most junior and senior hockey in Ontario
- Ontario Horticultural Association
- Ontario Hospital Association
- Open Handset Alliance, a consortium of companies dedicated to producing an open standard for mobile devices.
- Oral hypoglycemic agents, the majority of anti-diabetic drugs
- Oral Health America
- Oregon Health Authority
- Ormiston Horizon Academy
- Oral History Association, a professional association for oral historians
- Overseas housing allowance (United States military)
- RNZAF Base Ohakea, New Zealand, which uses IATA code OHA

Oha may refer to:

- Õha, village in Kaarma Parish, Saare County, Estonia
- Ugo Oha, a Nigerian basketball player
- Ofe Oha, a Nigerian soup
- "Oha", a song by Käptn Peng & Die Tentakel von Delphi from the album Die Zähmung der Hydra

== See also ==
- Okha, Russia, town in Russia
