= The Fiancee (film) =

1980 film

- Film poster
- Directed by: Günter Reisch; Günther Rücker
- Written by: Eva Lippold; Günter Reisch; Günther Rücker
- Starring: Jutta Wachowiak
- Cinematography: Jürgen Brauer
- Distributed by: DEFA
- Release date: 5 September 1980
- Running time: 83 minutes
- Country: East Germany
- Language: German

The Fiancee (German: Die Verlobte) is a 1980 East German drama film directed by Günter Reisch and Günther Rücker and based on a novel by Eva Lippold. The film is about the resistance of the communist Hella Lindau (Jutta Wachowiak) and her fiancé Hermann Reimers (Regimantas Adomaitis) against the Nazis.

The film won the Crystal Globe at the Karlovy Vary International Film Festival. It was also chosen as East Germany's official submission to the 53rd Academy Awards for Best Foreign Language Film, but did not manage to receive a nomination.

== Cast ==
- Jutta Wachowiak as Hella Lindau
- Regimantas Adomaitis as Reimers
- Slávka Budínová as Lola
- Christine Gloger as Frenzel
- Inge Keller as Irene
- Käthe Reichel as Olser
- Hans-Joachim Hegewald as Hensch
- Barbara Zinn as Elsie
- Katrin Saß as Barbara
- Ewa Zietek as Hilde
- Ursula Braun as Naudorf

== See also ==
- List of submissions to the 53rd Academy Awards for Best Foreign Language Film
- List of German submissions for the Academy Award for Best Foreign Language Film
