= Jutta Wachowiak =

German actress

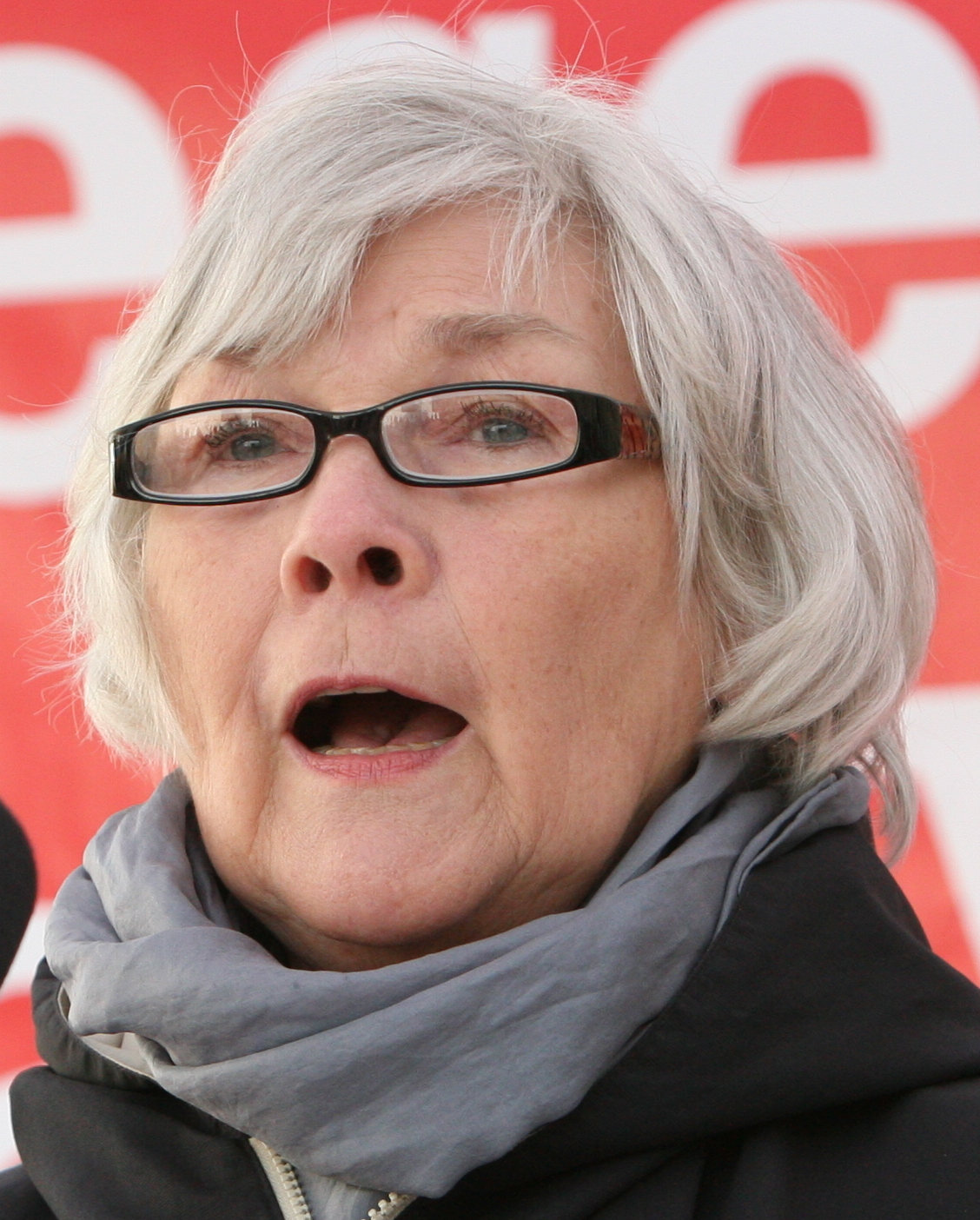
- Jutta Wachowiak in 2017
- Born: 13 December 1940 (age 85); Berlin, Germany
- Occupation: Actress
- Years active: 1962–present

Jutta Wachowiak (born 13 December 1940) is a German actress. She has appeared in more than 60 films and television shows since 1962. She starred in the 1986 film So Many Dreams, which was entered into the 37th Berlin International Film Festival.

== Selected filmography ==
- Follow Me, Scoundrels (1964)
- KLK Calling PTZ - The Red Orchestra (1971)
- The Fiancee (1980)
- So Many Dreams (1986)
- The House on the River (1986)
- Fallada: The Last Chapter (1988)
- Nikolaikirche (1995)
- The Drinker (1995)
- Rosenstrasse (2003)
