= Nightshapes =

1999 film

- Directed by: Andreas Dresen
- Written by: Andreas Dresen
- Produced by: Peter Rommel
- Starring: Myriam Abbas
- Cinematography: Andreas Höfer
- Release date: 12 August 1999
- Running time: 101 minutes
- Country: Germany
- Language: German

Nightshapes (German: Nachtgestalten) is a 1999 German drama film written and directed by Andreas Dresen. Michael Gwisdek won the Silver Bear for Best Actor in the 49th Berlin International Film Festival.

== Cast ==
- Myriam Abbas as Hanna
- Dominique Horwitz as Victor
- Oliver Breite as Jochen (as Oliver Bäßler)
- Susanne Bormann as Patty
- Michael Gwisdek as Peschke
- Ricardo Valentim as Feliz
- Ade Sapara as Ricardo
- Imogen Kogge as Rita
- Horst Krause as Taxifahrer / Cab Driver
- Axel Prahl as Polizist / Police Officer
