= Katrin Sass =

German actress (born 1956)

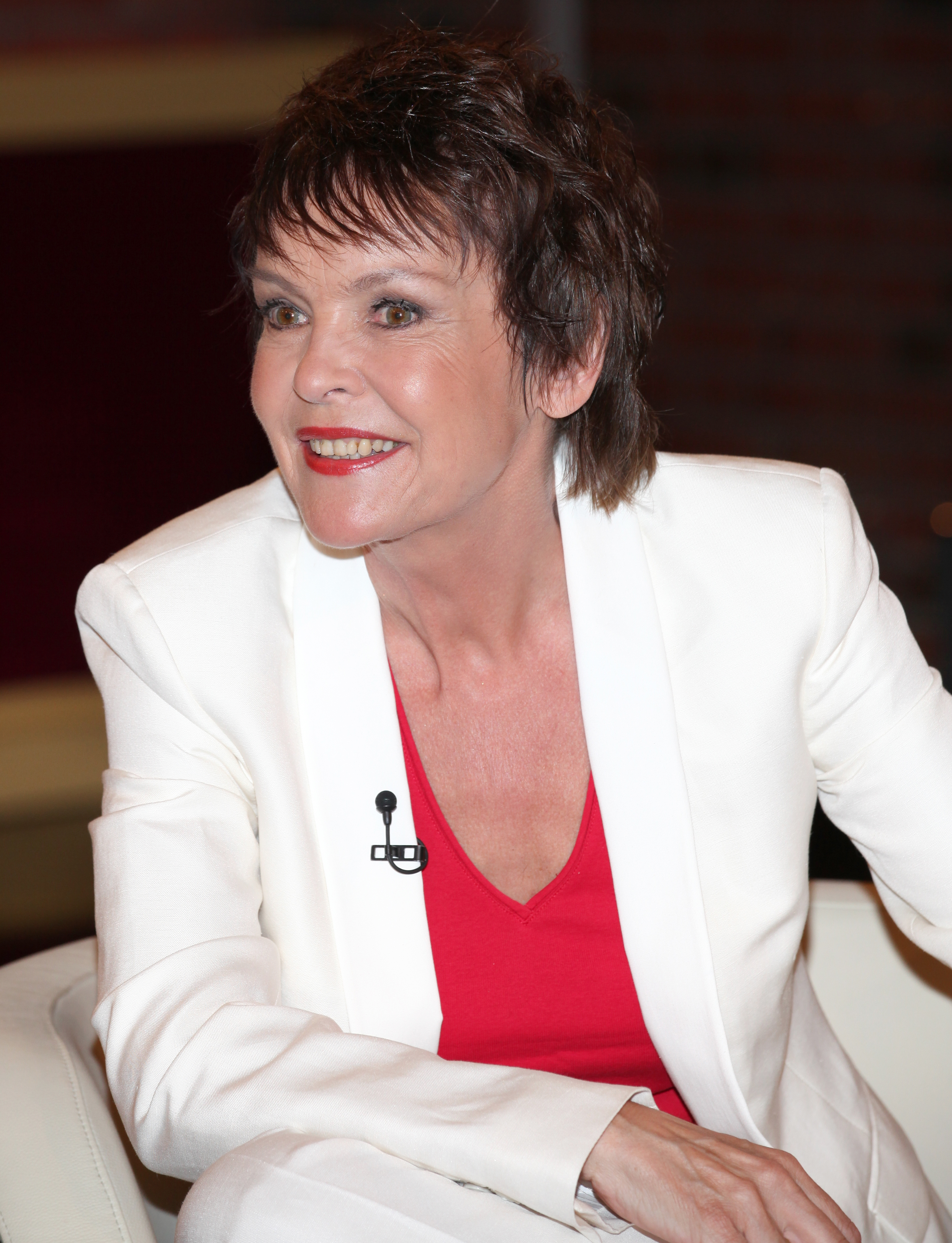
- Katrin Sass in 2012
- Born: 23 October 1956 (age 69); Schwerin, East Germany
- Occupation: Actress
- Years active: 1979–present

Katrin Sass (German: [ˈkatʁiːn ˈzas], for a time Katrin Saß) is a German actress. She became known internationally for playing the idealistic socialist mother Christiane Kerner in the 2003 tragicomedy Good Bye, Lenin!

== Biography ==
She was born in Schwerin, in the former East Germany, which is now the capital of the Federal State of Mecklenburg-Vorpommern. Before German reunification, she was a well-known film and stage actress in the German Democratic Republic. She made her film debut at age 23 in the 1979 film Bis daß der Tod euch scheidet, where she portrayed a disillusioned young wife. She won the Silver Bear for Best Actress at the 32nd Berlin International Film Festival for her role in the 1981 film Bürgschaft für ein Jahr. In 2011, she appeared in the music video of "Wir Sind am Leben" by the Berlin music duo Rosenstolz.

Sass said the GDR required her to spell her name with a "ß" presumably because "Sass" was associated with the Nazi SA and SS.

== Filmography ==
- Bis daß der Tod euch scheidet (1979)
- Bürgschaft für ein Jahr (1981)
- The House on the River (1986)
- Fallada: The Last Chapter (1988)
- Heidi M. (2001)
- Good Bye, Lenin! (2003) (with Daniel Brühl, Chulpan Khamatova, Michael Gwisdek and Alexander Beyer)
- Kiss me Kismet (2006)
- The Silence (2010)
- Weissensee (2010, 2013, 2015)
- Back on Track (2013)
- Der Usedom-Krimi (Television series, 2014, 2016, 2017, 2019, 2020)
