= Christina Drechsler =

German actress (1978–2022)

Christina Drechsler (1978–2022) was a German actress.

She was born in Berlin. Her acting credits include Cracks in the Shell (2011), November Child (2008) and Kleeblatt küsst Kaktus (2002). From 2003 to 2013 she was part of the Berliner Ensemble.

Christina Drechsler died on 30 December 2022.
