= The Tango Player =

1991 film

- Directed by: Roland Gräf
- Written by: Roland Gräf; Christoph Hein
- Produced by: Herbert Ehler
- Starring: Michael Gwisdek
- Cinematography: Peter Ziesche
- Edited by: Monika Schindler
- Release date: 28 February 1991
- Running time: 96 minutes
- Country: Germany
- Language: German

The Tango Player (German: Der Tangospieler) is a 1991 German drama film directed by Roland Gräf. It was entered into the 41st Berlin International Film Festival.

== Cast ==
- Michael Gwisdek as Hans-Peter Dallow
- Corinna Harfouch as Elke
- Hermann Beyer as Dr. Berger
- Peter Prager as Roessler
- Peter Sodann as Schulze
- Reiner Heise as Müller
- Jaecki Schwarz as Harry
