= The House on the River =

1986 film

- Directed by: Roland Gräf
- Written by: Roland Gräf; Friedrich Wolf; Christel Gräf
- Produced by: Herbert Ehler
- Starring: Katrin Saß
- Cinematography: Roland Dressel
- Edited by: Monika Schindler
- Release date: 16 January 1986
- Running time: 89 minutes
- Country: East Germany
- Language: German

The House on the River (German: Das Haus am Fluß) is a 1986 East German drama film directed by Roland Gräf. It was entered into the 36th Berlin International Film Festival.

== Cast ==
- Katrin Saß as Agnes Eckert (as Katrin Sass)
- Sylvester Groth as Heinz Hüsgen
- Manfred Gorr as Jupp Eckert
- Jutta Wachowiak as Mother Voß
- Rolf Hoppe as Director Hüsgen
- Corinna Harfouch as Emmi Voß
- Johanna Schall as Lena Brinken
- Peter Zimmermann as Werner Tiedemann
- Werner Godemann as Schimmelpfennig
- Matthias Schrader as Ferdinand Belz (as Mathis Schrader)
- Arianne Borbach as Lisbeth Voß
- Hermann Beyer as Peter Dressen
- Eckhard Becker as Gestapo Man
