= Roland Gräf =

German cinematographer

- Born: 13 October 1934; Meuselbach, Thuringia, Germany
- Died: 11 May 2017 (aged 82); Potsdam, Brandenburg, Germany
- Occupations: Cinematographer; Film director Screenwriter
- Years active: 1960–1995

Roland Gräf (13 October 1934 – 11 May 2017) was a German cinematographer, film director and screenwriter. In 1982 his film "Märkische Forschungen" won the Findling Award at the National Feature Film Festival of the GDR in Karl-Marx-Stadt (Nationales Spielfilmfestival der DDR). His 1986 film The House on the River was entered into the 36th Berlin International Film Festival. Three years later, his film Fallada: The Last Chapter was entered into the 39th Berlin International Film Festival. In 1991, his film The Tango Player was entered into the 41st Berlin International Film Festival.

== Selected filmography ==
- The House on the River (1986)
- Fallada: The Last Chapter (1988)
- The Tango Player (1991)
- The Mystery of the Amber Room (1992)
