= Fallada: The Last Chapter =

1988 film

- Directed by: Roland Gräf
- Written by: Roland Gräf; Helga Schütz; Christel Gräf
- Starring: Jörg Gudzuhn
- Cinematography: Roland Dressel
- Edited by: Monika Schindler
- Release date: 20 May 1988
- Running time: 101 minutes
- Country: East Germany
- Language: German

Fallada: The Last Chapter (German: Fallada – letztes Kapitel) is a 1988 East German drama film directed by Roland Gräf about the life of Hans Fallada. It was entered into the 39th Berlin International Film Festival.

== Plot ==
The film is set in 1930s Germany. It describes the deteriorating life of author Hans Fallada, whose real name is Rudolf Ditzen. The consolidation of the Nazi's power around him brought him immense pressure and caused him to descend into a deep personal crisis and lose his mental balance. He, who once had a stable family, turns to bursts of anger, violence, and relapses on morphine.

== Cast ==
- Jörg Gudzuhn as Hans Fallada
- Jutta Wachowiak as Anna Fallada
- Katrin Saß as Ursula Losch
- Corinna Harfouch as Else-Marie Bukonje
- Ulrike Krumbiegel as Anneliese
- Marga Legal as Falladas Mutter
- Hermann Beyer as Abteilungsleiter
- Carl Heinz Choynski as Paselk, Wächter
- Werner Dissel as Doktor
- Werner Godemann as Gendarm
- Peter-Mario Grau as Journalist
- Aleksei Yakubov as Kleiner Offizier
- Werner Kos as Journalist
- Joachim Lätsch as August
