= Robert Gwisdek =

German actor and musician (born 1984)

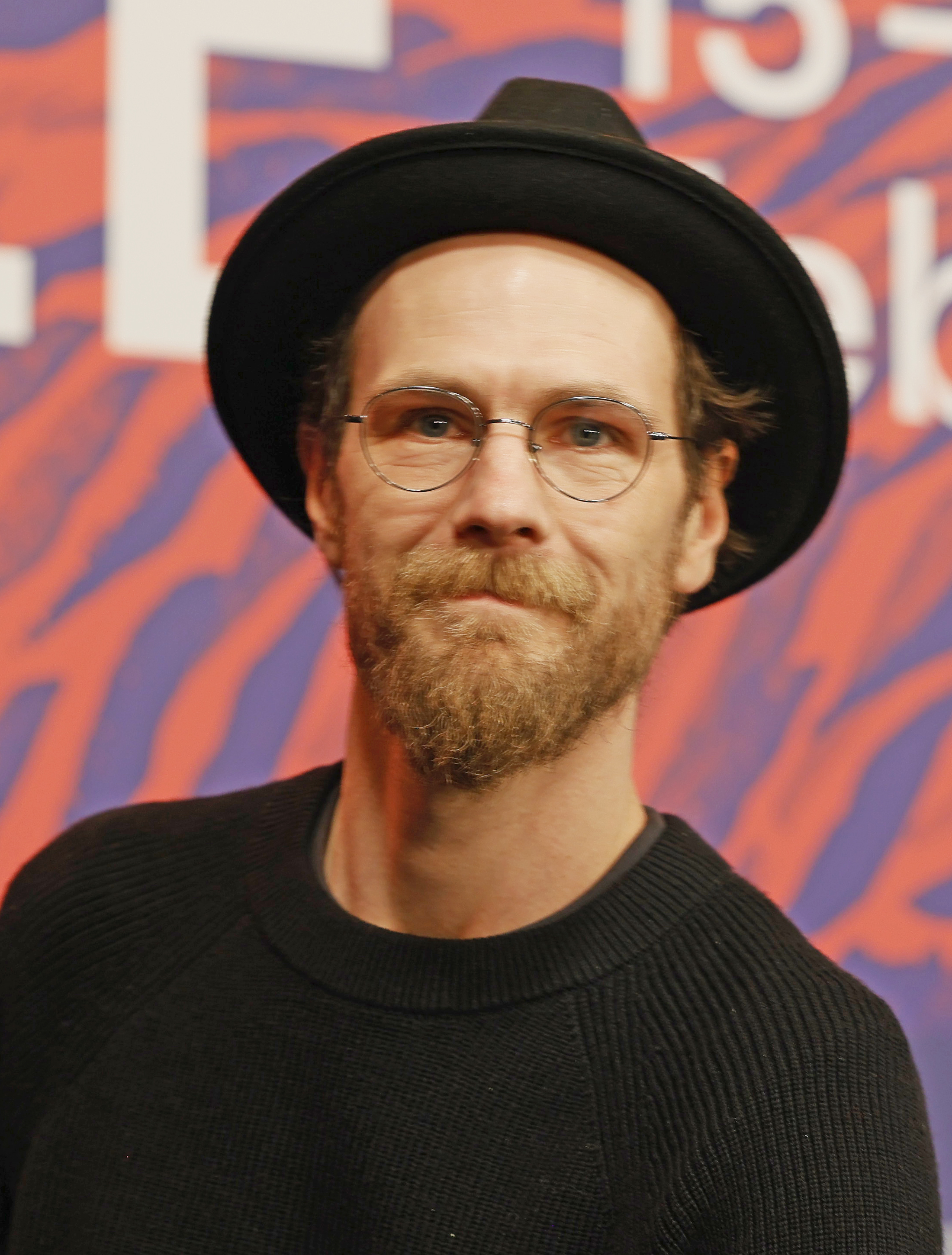
- Gwisdek in 2024
- Born: 29 January 1984 (age 42); East Berlin, East Germany
- Other name: Käptn Peng
- Occupations: Actor, musician
- Years active: 1988–present
- Parents: Michael Gwisdek (actor); Corinna Harfouch (actor)

Robert Gwisdek (born 29 January 1984) is a German actor and musician. The son of actors Michael Gwisdek and Corinna Harfouch, he began acting as a child in one of his father's films. Under the name Käptn Peng he has released three albums.

== Early life ==
Robert Gwisdek was born 29 January 1984 in East Berlin, to actors Michael Gwisdek and Corinna Harfouch. He is the brother of musician Johannes Gwisdek (born 1980). He was in theatre as a child. He studied acting at the University of Television and Film Munich.

== Career ==
At the age of five, he acted in the film Treffen in Travers, which was his father's first directing experience. He stated part of his motivation for becoming an actor was accidental, as he had to leave school, and, lacking a high school diploma, he could still get into drama school. He directed a short film, his first directed work, Das Heimweh der Feldforscher, which was a festival success.

He performs music under the name Käptn Peng. In 2012, he released his debut album, Die Zähmung der Hydra, as Shaban & Käptn Peng, with his brother Johannes Gwisdek (Shaban). As part of Käptn Peng & Die Tentakel von Delphi, he released Expedition ins O and Das nullte Kapitel in 2013 and 2017, respectively. He later said in an interview promoting his 2012 album Die Zähmung der Hydra that he did not believe himself to have the personality of an actor, and would never define himself as such, not being able to do the job for long and be happy with it.

Themes explored in Gwisdek's music mostly revolve around the psyche, madness and strange monsters, but also life, love and emotions. His music is known for its wordplay and philosophical themes. He published a novel in 2014, Der unsichtbare Apfel. He directed the music video for the Rammstein song "Zeit".

== Selected filmography ==
Year	Title	Role	Notes
1989	Treffen in Travers		
1996	Father's Day	Leo	
2005	NVA		
2009	13 Semester		
2012	Kohlhaas oder die Verhältnismäßigkeit der Mittel	Lehmann	
2017	Tiger Girl	Ohrfeigen-Mann	
2017	Blind & Hässlich	Augenarzt	
2018	3 Days in Quiberon	Michael Jürgs	
2024	Der Junge dem die Welt gehört		
2026	Rose		

== Discography ==
- Die Zähmung der Hydra with his brother, Johannes Gwisdek, as Shaban & Käptn Peng (2012)
- Expedition ins O as part of Käptn Peng & Die Tentakel von Delphi (2013)
- Alki, Alki (Muzik zum Film) as part of Käptn Peng & Die Tentakel von Delphi (2015)
- Live in Berlin as part of Käptn Peng & Die Tentakel von Delphi (2015)
- Das nullte Kapitel as part of Käptn Peng & Die Tentakel von Delphi (2017)
- Drachendressur EP as part of Käptn Peng & Die Tentakel von Delphi (2019)
- It's Is My Life - Zyklopen Im Traktorstrahl EP as part of Käptn Peng & Die Tentakel von Delphi (2019)
- Die Känguru Verschwörung OST as part of Käptn Peng & Die Tentakel von Delphi (2022)
- Der Junge dem die Welt gehört Soundtrack Käptn Peng Solo (2024)
