= Günther Rücker =

German writer, playwright and film director

Günther Rücker (February 2, 1924 - February 24, 2008) was a German writer, playwright and film director. Rücker won several awards for his work, including the National Prize of the GDR and the Prix Italia.

Rücker was born at Reichenberg (Liberec), and studied at the Theaterhochschule Leipzig. He was a Stasi informer after 1978. He died in Meiningen, aged 84.

== Selected filmography ==
- First Spaceship on Venus (1959)
- Der Fall Gleiwitz (1961)
- Die besten Jahre (1965)
- Her Third (1971)
- Bis daß der Tod euch scheidet (1978), Grand Prix at the Karlovy Vary International Film Festival and First Prize at the Sydney Film Festival
- The Fiancee (1979)
