= Good Bye, Lenin! =

2003 German film by Wolfgang Becker

- Theatrical release poster
- Directed by: Wolfgang Becker
- Written by: Wolfgang Becker; Bernd Lichtenberg
- Produced by: Stefan Arndt
- Starring: Daniel Brühl; Katrin Sass; Chulpan Khamatova; Florian Lukas; Maria Simon; Alexander Beyer
- Cinematography: Martin Kukula
- Edited by: Peter R. Adam
- Music by: Yann Tiersen; Claire Pichet; Antonello Marafioti
- Production company: X-Filme Creative Pool
- Distributed by: X Verleih AG (through Warner Bros. Pictures)
- Release date: 13 February 2003
- Running time: 121 minutes
- Country: Germany
- Language: German
- Budget: DM 9.6 million (€4.8 million) (approx. $6.5 million)
- Box office: $79 million

Good Bye, Lenin! is a 2003 German tragicomedy film, directed by Wolfgang Becker. The cast includes Daniel Brühl, Katrin Sass, Chulpan Khamatova, and Maria Simon. The story follows a family in East Germany; the mother is dedicated to the socialist cause and falls into a coma in October 1989, shortly before the Peaceful Revolution in November. When she awakens eight months later in June 1990, her son attempts to protect her from a fatal shock by concealing the fall of the Berlin Wall and the collapse of Communism in East Germany.

Most scenes were shot at the Karl-Marx-Allee in Berlin and around Plattenbau buildings near Alexanderplatz. Good Bye, Lenin! received numerous honours, including 2003's European Film Award for Best Film and German Film Award for Best Fiction Film.

== Plot ==
The film is set in East Berlin, in the period from October 1989 to a few days after German reunification in October 1990.

Alex Kerner lives with his mother Christiane, his sister Ariane, and Ariane’s infant daughter Paula. Alex's father purportedly abandoned the family for a mistress in the West in 1978. His mother joined the Socialist Unity Party and devoted her time to advocating for citizens. Alex is disillusioned by the celebration of East Germany's 40th anniversary and participates in an anti-government demonstration. There he meets a girl, but they are separated by the Volkspolizei before they can introduce themselves.

Christiane, seeing Alex being arrested and beaten, suffers a heart attack and falls into a coma because nobody initially comes to her aid. Visiting his mother in the hospital, Alex finds that her nurse, Lara, is the girl from the demonstration. She (an exchange student from the Soviet Union) and Alex begin dating shortly afterward.

Erich Honecker resigns, Egon Krenz takes over, the borders are opened, the Berlin Wall falls, East Germany holds free elections, and capitalism comes to East Berlin. Alex begins working for a West German firm selling and installing satellite dishes. He befriends a Western colleague, aspiring filmmaker Denis Domaschke. Ariane drops out of university, where she studied economics, and begins working at Burger King, dating her manager Rainer, who moves into their apartment.

After eight months, Christiane awakens from her coma. Her doctor warns her family that she is still weak and any shock might cause another, possibly fatal, heart attack. Alex resolves to conceal the profound societal changes from her and maintain the illusion that the German Democratic Republic is just as it was before her coma. He retrieves their old East German furniture, makes everyone in the flat dress in old, East German clothes, and repackages new Western food in old East German jars. The deception becomes increasingly complicated as Christiane witnesses strange occurrences, such as a gigantic Coca-Cola banner on an adjacent building. Denis and Alex create fake news broadcasts in the style of old East German news tapes to explain these odd events. Alex and Ariane fail to find where Christiane keeps her life savings (in East German marks) in time to exchange them for West German marks before the deadline.

Christiane gets stronger and one day wanders outside while Alex is asleep. She sees her neighbours' old East German furniture stacked in the street, new West German cars for sale, advertisements for Western corporations, and a statue of Lenin being flown away by helicopter. Alex and Ariane take her back home and Alex shows her a fake newscast explaining East Germany is now accepting refugees from the West following an economic crisis there. Ariane tells Alex she is pregnant with Rainer's baby; it will be half East German and half West German, a symbol of the new Germany.

At the family dacha Christiane reveals her secret: her husband had fled not for a mistress but because of the difficulties he faced for refusing to join the ruling party. The plan had been for the rest of the family to join him. Christiane, fearing the government would take her children if things went wrong, decided to stay. Contrary to what she had told her children, their father wrote many letters that she hid. As she declares her wish to see her husband one last time to make amends, she relapses and is taken back to hospital.

Alex meets his father, Robert, who has remarried, has two children, and lives in West Berlin. He convinces Robert to see Christiane one last time. Under pressure to reveal the truth about the fall of the East, Alex creates a final fake news segment, persuading a taxi driver (who strongly resembles cosmonaut Sigmund Jähn, the first German in space and Alex's childhood hero) to act in the false news report as the new leader of East Germany and to give a speech about opening the borders to the West. However, unbeknownst to Alex, Lara had already recounted the true political developments to Christiane earlier that day.

Christiane dies two days later, outliving the German Democratic Republic by three days after German reunification. The family and friends scatter her ashes in the wind using a toy rocket Alex made with his father during childhood.

== Cast ==
- Daniel Brühl as Alexander "Alex" Kerner
- Katrin Sass as Christiane Kerner
- Chulpan Khamatova as Lara
- Maria Simon as Ariane Kerner
- Florian Lukas as Denis Domaschke
- Alexander Beyer as Rainer
- Burghart Klaußner as Robert Kerner
- Michael Gwisdek as Klapprath
- Christine Schorn as Frau Schäfer
- Jürgen Holtz as Herr Ganske
- Jochen Stern as Herr Mehlert
- Stefan Walz as a Sigmund Jähn look-alike taxi-driver
- Eberhard Kirchberg as Dr. Wagner
- Hans-Uwe Bauer as Dr. Mewes
- Nico Ledermüller as 11-year-old Alex Kerner

== Development ==
For director Wolfgang Becker, work on Good Bye, Lenin! began in the summer of 1999, but for screenwriter Bernd Lichtenberg, the work had already begun almost a decade earlier. Lichtenberg's experience of the reunification period as a New West Berliner at a similar age to his protagonist Alex was formed into a story which already included many aspects of the later film, but first ended up "in the drawer" for a few years. He stated: "I had the feeling that it simply wasn't the right time yet." This only changed when he saw Becker's Life Is All You Get (German: Das Leben ist eine Baustelle). Especially interested in the mix of sadness and comedy, which he also envisaged for his film, he believed he had found the right person to bring his idea to life. "All of a sudden there was this energy", recalls producer Stefan Arndt; when he and Becker read the 5-page synopsis, "right then we knew exactly we could tell everything that we so badly had wanted to tell".

Nevertheless, it was not an easy process to finish the script. It supposedly took them six drafts plus a few interim versions to complete the script. Lichtenberg wrote the first drafts by himself. He stayed in close contact with Becker who voiced his criticism, especially of the characters. This was an important point for both of them so it was one they argued over as they both wanted to tell the story "through the characters". The character that underwent the most radical change was Denis, as he was changed from a main character to a side character. Initially conceived as a young overweight boy from Turkey who was to be married off against his will, he was changed into an amateur film maker, who is as boldly imaginative as he is practical. After completing the script, which the screenwriter and producer worked on together towards the end, their collaboration was not over. During the actual filming, Lichtenberg was involved whenever Becker wanted more changes.

== Soundtrack ==
The film score was composed by Yann Tiersen, except the version of "Summer 78" sung by Claire Pichet. Stylistically, the music is very similar to Tiersen's earlier work on the soundtrack to Amélie. One piano composition, "Comptine d'un autre été : L'après-midi", is used in both films.

Several famous East German songs are featured. Two children, members of the Ernst Thälmann Pioneer Organisation, sing "Unsere Heimat" ('Our Homeland'). Friends of Christiane's (living in the same building) follow with "Bau Auf! Bau Auf!" ('Build Up! Build Up!'), another anthem of the Free German Youth. The final fake newscast with Sigmund Jähn features a rousing rendition of the East German national anthem, "Auferstanden aus Ruinen".

== Ostalgie ==
Alex creates fictional newscasts to fool his mother with their earlier East German lifestyle and Communist environment. He goes out of his way to use East German products, such as Spreewald gherkins, to deceive his mother and create a fantasy. His older sister Ariane quickly adopts the new Western ideals and lifestyle, but it is not so easy for Alex. Ostalgie is a German neologism for nostalgia for some aspects of life in former East Germany, which is a common theme in Good Bye, Lenin! Alex shows signs of Ostalgie when he begins to increasingly criticise the Western changes in themselves.

German-American historian Andreas Daum has suggested a new interpretation, moving beyond the paradigm of Ostalgie. He argues that Alex's efforts to present his mother with an alternate narrative of what happened during her coma are not meant to preserve a bygone state or falsify history. Instead, they use counterfactual history to cope with the unsettling experience of dramatic change. Alex's charades are conduits that allow all characters, including himself, to move from what they have been familiar with toward a new future. In this view, Good Bye, Lenin! does not reflect a nostalgic attachment to the past, nor its retrospective idealization, but the film demonstrates a creative way of handling societal transformations, even beyond the specific East German setting.

== Reception ==
The film received generally favorable reviews. On the review aggregator website Rotten Tomatoes, 91% of 108 critics' reviews are positive. The website's consensus reads: "Heartfelt and sly, Good Bye, Lenin! succeeds as a satire by foregrounding the personal before the political, yielding a charming comedy full of sociopolitical insight." Metacritic, which uses a weighted average, assigned the film a score of 68 out of 100, based on 32 critics, indicating "generally favorable" reviews. Empire magazine gave the film four stars out of five, saying: "An ingenious little idea that is funny, moving and—gasp!—even makes you think." The magazine also ranked it 91st in "The 100 Best Films of World Cinema" in 2010.

It was a box office success in both parts of Germany and its release caused a new wave of Ostalgie, which was exploited by movie theatres, with employers donned in Free German Youth shirts and red scarves, as well as businesses selling GDR memorabilia and books, music, and games of the Ossi era.

Good Bye, Lenin! is frequently contrasted with The Lives of Others, which was released three years later, in 2006. Both films portray the legacy of East Germany, but with decidedly different tones.

=== Accolades ===
Good Bye, Lenin! was submitted for consideration for the Academy Award for Best Foreign Language Film, but not nominated.

Award	Date of ceremony	Category	Recipient(s)	Result	Ref(s)
BAFTA Awards	15 February 2004	Best Film Not in the English Language	Wolfgang Becker	Nominated	
Berlin International Film Festival	2003	Golden Bear	Wolfgang Becker	Nominated	
Berlin International Film Festival	2003	Blue Angel	Wolfgang Becker	Won	
César Awards	February 2004	Best Film from the European Union	Wolfgang Becker	Won	
European Film Awards	6 December 2003	Best Film	Wolfgang Becker	Won	
European Film Awards	6 December 2003	Best Director	Wolfgang Becker	Nominated	
European Film Awards	6 December 2003	Best Actor	Daniel Brühl	Won	
European Film Awards	6 December 2003	Best Actress	Katrin Sass	Nominated	
European Film Awards	6 December 2003	Best Screenwriter	Bernd Lichtenberg	Won	
German Film Award	2003	Best Fiction Film	Wolfgang Becker	Won	
German Film Award	2003	Best Director	Wolfgang Becker	Won	
German Film Award	2003	Outstanding Actor	Daniel Brühl	Won	
German Film Award	2003	Outstanding Actress	Katrin Sass	Nominated	
German Film Award	2003	Outstanding Screenwriter	Bernd Lichtenberg	Won	
German Film Award	2003	Outstanding Editing	Peter R. Adam	Won	
German Film Award	2003	Outstanding Music	Yann Tiersen	Won	
German Film Award	2003	Outstanding Production Design	Lothar Holler	Won	
German Film Award	2003	Outstanding Supporting Actor	Florian Lukas	Won	
German Film Award	2003	Outstanding Supporting Actress	Maria Simon	Nominated	
Golden Eagle Award	January 31, 2004	Best Foreign Language Film	Wolfgang Becker	Nominated	
Golden Globes	25 January 2004	Best Foreign Language Film	Wolfgang Becker	Nominated	
Goya Awards	31 January 2004	Best European Film	Wolfgang Becker	Won	
London Film Critics' Circle	11 February 2004	Foreign Language Film of the Year	Wolfgang Becker	Won	

== Adaptation ==
An unofficial spiritual Indian remake of Good Bye, Lenin! was released 17 years later in the form of the Hindi-language comedy-drama Doordarshan, also referred to by its changed title Door Ke Darshan; written and directed by Gagan Puri, it explores a family's attempts to recreate a bygone era to prevent the family matron from suffering a shock when she recovers 30 years after having fallen into coma.

In Japan, Masaki Aiba of the music group Arashi played the role of Alex in a stage version scheduled for Spring 2025, directed by Satoshi Kamimura. The play ran from March 9 – March 31, 2025 at Tokyo's Parco Theater, April 5 – April 7, 2025 at Fukuoka's Canal City Theater and April 11 – April 15, 2025 at Osaka's Morinomiya Piloti Hall.

== See also ==
- Spreewald gherkins, one of the foods Christiane wants
- Dookudu, Indian-Telugu film with similar plot
- La Dolce Vita, origin of helicopter statue sequence
