= Cracks in the Shell =

2011 film directed by Christian Schwochow

- Film poster
- German: Die Unsichtbare
- Directed by: Christian Schwochow
- Starring: Stine Fischer Christensen; Ulrich Noethen
- Release date: 3 July 2011 (KVIFF)
- Running time: 113 minutes
- Country: Germany
- Language: German

Cracks in the Shell (German: Die Unsichtbare; lit. 'The invisible') is a 2011 German drama film directed by Christian Schwochow.

== Cast ==
- Stine Fischer Christensen as Josephine 'Fine' Lorenz
- Ulrich Noethen as Kaspar Friedmann
- Dagmar Manzel as Susanne Lorenz
- Christina Drechsler as Jule Lorenz
- Ronald Zehrfeld as Joachim
- Anna Maria Mühe as Irina
- Ulrich Matthes as Ben Kästner
- Matthias Weidenhöfer as Christoph Werner
- Gudrun Landgrebe as Vera
- Corinna Harfouch as Nina
- Annette Lober as Nadja
- Bernd-Christian Althoff as Olaf
