= Lara (2019 film) =

2019 film directed by Jan-Ole Gerster

- Directed by: Jan-Ole Gerster
- Starring: Corinna Harfouch; Tom Schilling
- Release date: 30 June 2019 (KVIFF)
- Running time: 98 minutes
- Country: Germany
- Language: German

Lara is a 2019 German drama film directed by Jan-Ole Gerster.

== Plot ==
The film centres around Lara, a stern civil servant who devotes herself to the career of her piano virtuoso son, Viktor, while abandoning her own creative pursuits.

== Cast ==
- Corinna Harfouch — Lara Jenkins
- Tom Schilling — Viktor Jenkins
- Rainer Bock — Paul Jenkins
- Volkmar Kleinert — Prof. Reinhoffer
- André Jung — Mr. Czerny
- Gudrun Ritter — Lara's mother

== Awards ==
- 2019: Karlovy Vary International Film Festival — Crystal Globe/Special Prize of the Jury, Award of Ecumenical Jury, Best Actress — Corinna Harfouch
- 2019: Les Arcs Film Festival — Press Prize
- 2019: Filmfest München — FIPRESCI Prize, Best Director (New German Cinema Section)
- 2019: Filmkunstwochen Leipzig — Gilde-Filmpreis — Best Film (national)
- 2019: Hamptons International Film Festival NY — Narrative Feature — Corinna Harfouch — Best Performance, Golden Starfish Award — Honorable Mention
- 2019: Ljubljana International Film Festival — Special Mention Kingfisher Award — Blaz Kutin — Script
- 2019: Bavarian Film Price — Best Filmmusic Award — Arash Safaian
