= Dagmar Manzel =

German actress

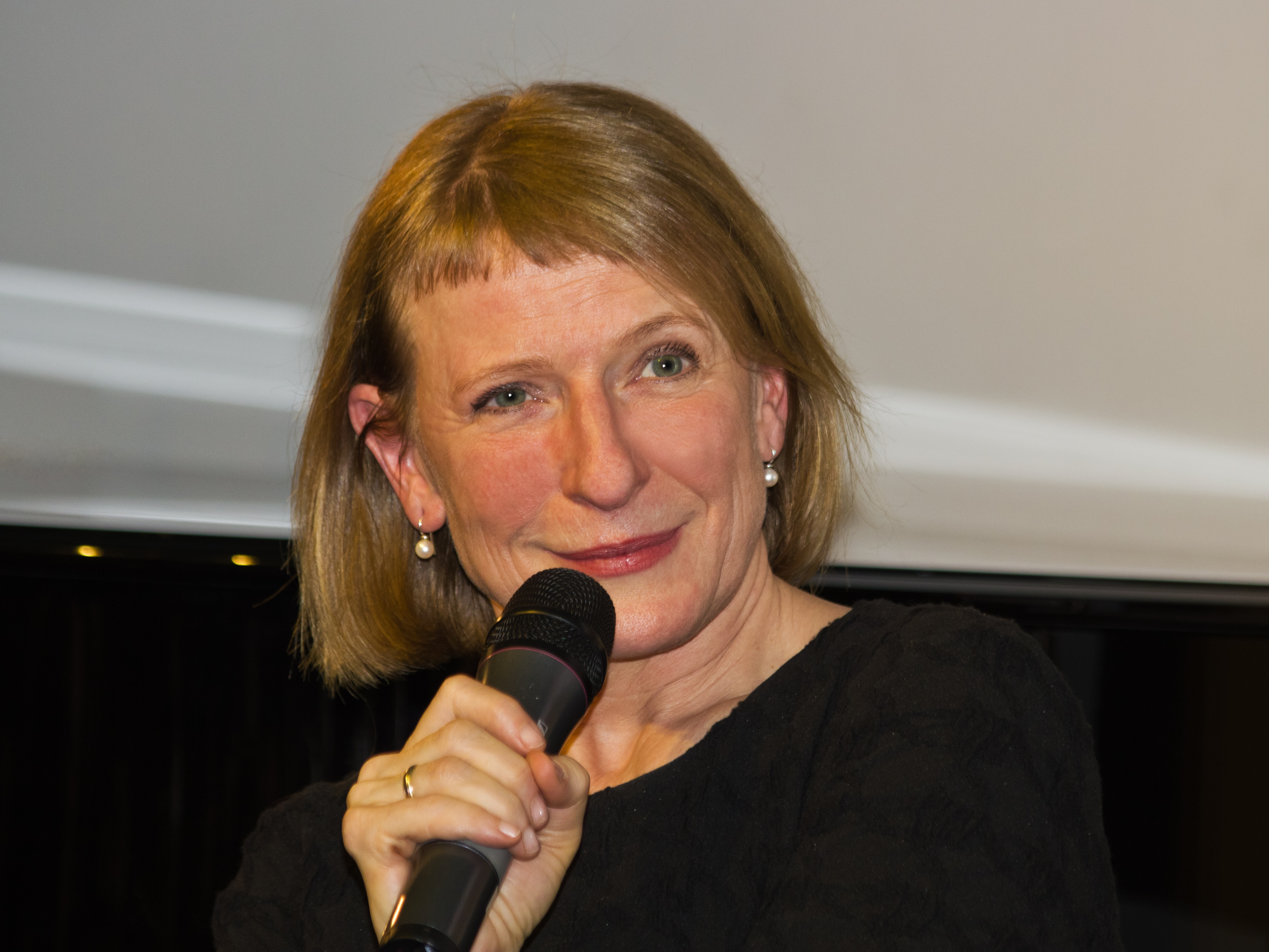
- Born: 1 September 1958 (age 67); East Berlin, East Germany
- Occupation: Actress
- Years active: 1983–present

Dagmar Manzel (born 1 September 1958) is a German actress. She has appeared in more than 80 films and television shows since 1979. She starred in the 1986 film So Many Dreams, which was entered into the 37th Berlin International Film Festival.

The daughter of teachers Paul and Annemarie, Manzel grew up in East Berlin. After high school she studied acting in Berlin. She graduated in 1980 and debuted at the Staatstheater Dresden. In 1983 she moved to the Deutsches Theater in Berlin, which became her artistic home. She was a resident actor there until 2001, working with directors such as Thomas Langhoff, Heiner Müller, and Thomas Schulte-Michels.

In addition to her acting work, she also appeared in several musical theater productions. In 2002, she had the title role in Thomas Schulte-Michels' staging of Jacques Offenbach's operetta La Grande-Duchesse de Gérolstein at the Deutsches Theater Berlin and also played the lead role in his production of Offenbach's operetta La Périchole 2008 at the Berliner Ensemble.

In autumn 2004, Manzel performed at the Komische Oper Berlin, the female lead in the much-vaunted German premiere of Stephen Sondheim's musical Sweeney Todd, directed by Christopher Bond. She repeated the role in a 2024 production, also with the Komische Oper.

In 2012, Manzel was awarded the German Film Prize for her supporting role in Christian Schwochow's drama Cracks in the Shell. That same year, she was on the stage of the Komische Oper Berlin with Seven Songs/The Seven Deadly Sins.

In 2022, Manzel made her directorial debut directing Pippi Langstrumpf, a children's opera based on the Pippi Longstocking books by Astrid Lindgren, composed by Franz Wittenbrink and conducted by Matthew Toogood, performed at the Komische Oper Berlin.

== Selected filmography ==
Film
| Year | Title | Role | Notes |
|---|---|---|---|
| 1986 | So Many Dreams | | |
| 1989 | Coming Out | | |
| 1992 | Schtonk! | | |
| 1996 | After Five in the Forest Primeval | | |
| 1997 | The Pharmacist | | |
| 1999 | Klemperer – Ein Leben in Deutschland | Eva Klemperer | TV series |
| 2001 | Kelly Bastian – Geschichte einer Hoffnung | Petra Kelly | TV film |
| 2005 | Speer und Er | Margarete Speer | TV series |
| 2007 | Head Under Water | Anita Bartsch | |
| 2009 | John Rabe | Dora Rabe | |
| 2011 | Remembrance | | |
| 2011 | Cracks in the Shell | Susanne Lorenz | |
| 2013 | Murder by Numbers | Marina Kröger | TV film |
| 2018 | As Green As It Gets | Hannah | |
