= So Many Dreams =

1986 film

- Directed by: Heiner Carow
- Written by: Imma Lüning; Wolfram Witt; Heiner Carow
- Starring: Jutta Wachowiak
- Cinematography: Peter Ziesche
- Edited by: Evelyn Carow
- Release date: 16 September 1986
- Running time: 85 minutes
- Country: East Germany
- Language: German

So Many Dreams (German: So viele Träume) is a 1986 East German drama film directed by Heiner Carow. It was entered into the 37th Berlin International Film Festival.

== Cast ==
- Jutta Wachowiak as Christine
- Dagmar Manzel as Claudia
- Peter-René Lüdicke as Ludwig
- Heiko Hehlmann as Gunnar
- Gudrun Okras as Christines Mutter
- Heinz Hupfer as Christines Vater
- Thomas Hinrich as Hinrich
- Christine Harbort as James' Mutter
- Hans-Dieter Leuckert as James
- Christian Grashof as Professor Kühne
- Gerry Wolff as Oberbürgermeister
- Lydia Billiet as Die Fremde
