= Gerry Wolff =

German actor

- Born: Gerhard Wolff; 23 June 1920; Bremen, Weimar Republic
- Died: 16 February 2005 (aged 84); Oranienburg, Germany
- Occupation: Actor

Gerry Wolff (23 June 1920 – 16 February 2005) was a German actor. He was born in Bremen, Germany and died in Oranienburg, Brandenburg, Germany.

== Selected filmography ==
- Bärenburger Schnurre (1957)
- Naked Among Wolves (1963)
- Tecumseh (1972)
- Elective Affinities (1974)
- Anton the Magician (1978)
- So Many Dreams (1986)
