= The Big Mambo =

1998 film

- Directed by: Michael Gwisdek
- Written by: Michael Gwisdek
- Starring: Corinna Harfouch; Michael Gwisdek; Jürgen Vogel
- Cinematography: Roland Dressel
- Release date: 26 March 1998
- Running time: 106 minutes
- Country: Germany
- Language: German

The Big Mambo (German: Das Mambospiel) is a 1998 German comedy film written and directed by Michael Gwisdek. It was entered into the 48th Berlin International Film Festival.

== Cast ==
In alphabetical order

- Nina Baudler as Inge
- Alexander Beyer as Bauarbeiter
- Dietmar Bär as Produzent
- Karin Düwel
- Gabi Fleming as Sekretärin
- Christian Grashof
- Michael Gwisdek as Martin
- Corinna Harfouch as Maria
- Henry Hübchen as Chris
- Mario Irrek as Rudi
- Heide Kipp
- Uwe Kockisch as Winne
- Uli Krohm as Lockenkopf
- Franziska Petri as Julia
- Boris Ponev as Ricki
- Gerd Preusche as Jossi
- Carl-Hermann Risse
- Michael Schweighöfer as Peter
- Bernd Stempel as Bankangestellter
- Jürgen Vogel as Gregor
- Harald Warmbrunn
- Douglas Welbat as Wirt
