= Peter R. Adam =

German film editor (1957–2023)

- Born: Peter Adam; 29 May 1957; Pirmasens, West Germany
- Died: 4 December 2023 (aged 66)
- Occupation: Film editor
- Awards: German Film Award

Peter Adam (29 May 1957 – 4 December 2023), better known by his professional name Peter R. Adam, was a German film editor. He worked on such films as An American Werewolf in Paris, Good Bye, Lenin!, and Anonymous. Adam was one of the first to use digital editing tools. He won the Deutscher Filmpreis for editing in 1998 for his work on Comedian Harmonists.

Adam was a founding member of the Deutsche Filmakademie. He died on 4 December 2023, aged 66.
