= Treffen in Travers =

1988 film

- Directed by: Michael Gwisdek
- Written by: Michael Gwisdek; Fritz Hofmann; Thomas Knauf
- Starring: Hermann Beyer
- Cinematography: Claus Neumann
- Edited by: Evelyn Carow
- Release date: 1988
- Running time: 101 minutes
- Country: Germany
- Language: German

Treffen in Travers ("Encounter in Travers [Switzerland]") is a 1988 German drama film directed by Michael Gwisdek. It was screened in the Un Certain Regard section at the 1989 Cannes Film Festival.

== Cast ==
- Hermann Beyer as Georg Forster
- Corinna Harfouch as Therese Forster
- Uwe Kockisch as Ferdinand Huber
- Susanne Bormann as Röschen Forster
- Lucie Gebhardt as Klärchen Forster
- Astrid Krenz as Liese
- Peter Dommisch as Leonidas
- Heide Kipp as Marthe
- Wolf-Dietrich Köllner as Rougemont
- Andreas Schneider as Jean Claude
- Hark Bohm as Bürgermeister
