= Corinna Harfouch =

German actress

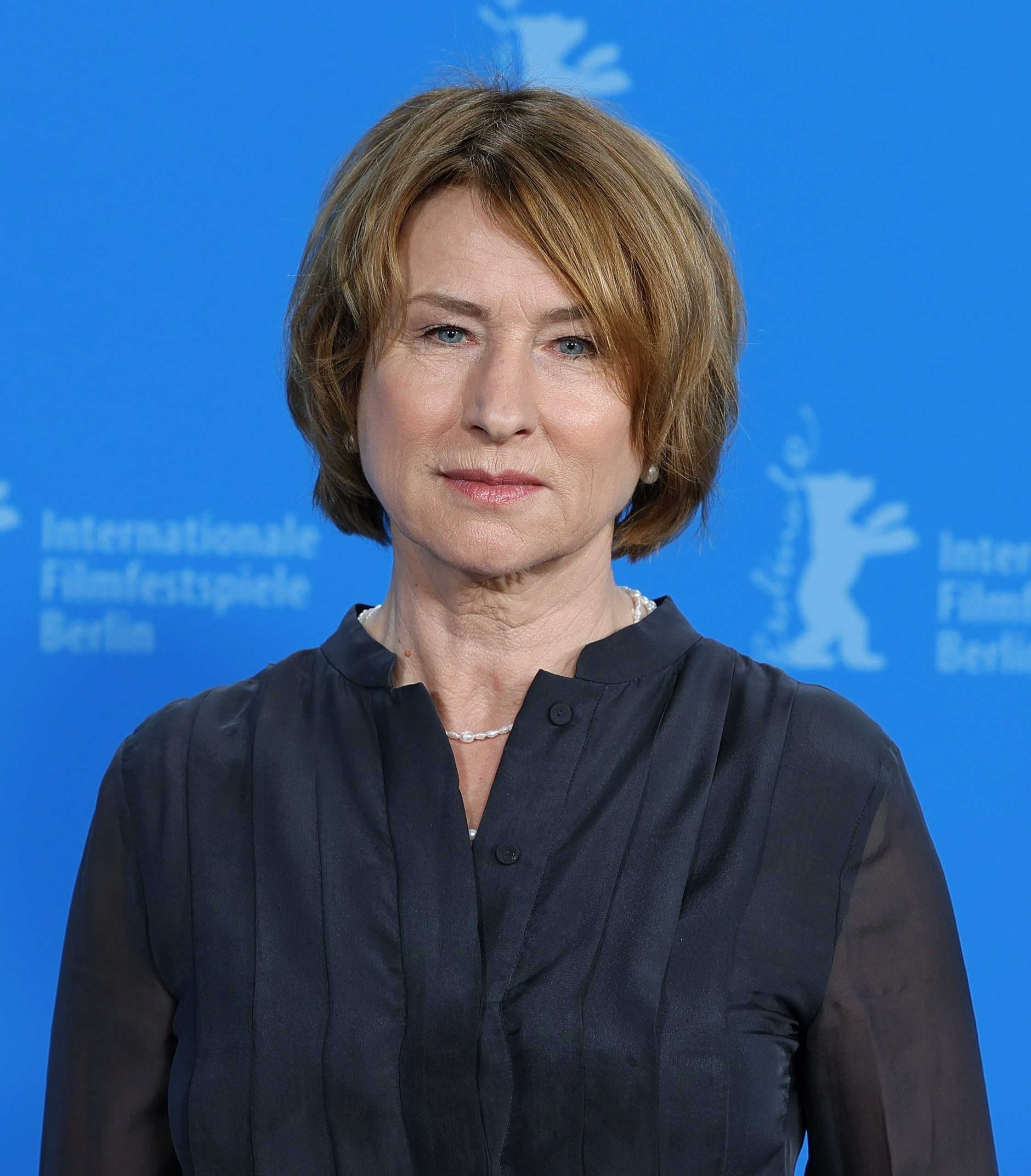
- Harfouch in 2024
- Born: Corinna Meffert; 16 October 1954 (age 72); Suhl, Thuringia, East Germany
- Occupation: Actress
- Years active: 1986–present
- Spouse: Nabil Harfouch (divorced) Michael Gwisdek (m. 1985; div. 2007)
- Children: 3, including Robert Gwisdek

Corinna Harfouch (German: [koˈʁɪna haʁˈfʊx]; née Meffert; born 16 October 1954) is a German actress.

== Early life and education ==
Harfouch was born in Suhl, East Germany, the daughter of the teacher Wolfgang Meffert and his wife Marianne (née Kleber). She worked as a nurse and studied acting at the National Theatre School in Berlin from 1978 to 1981.

== Career ==
In 1994, Harfouch was a member of the jury at the 44th Berlin International Film Festival, chaired by Jeremy Thomas.

After a few guest roles in the Tatort crime series, Harfouch became part of the permanent cast in 2023, succeeding Meret Becker on the series' Berlin team.

== Personal life ==
Harfouch's first husband was a Lebanese computer scientist named Nabil Harfouch, with whom she has one daughter. From 1985 to 2007, she was married to Michael Gwisdek, with whom she has two sons, musician Johannes Gwisdek and actor Robert Gwisdek.

== Selected filmography ==
- 1986: The House on the River
- 1987: Yasemin
- 1988: Die Schauspielerin
- 1988: Treffen in Travers
- 1988: Fallada: The Last Chapter
- 1989: Pestalozzi's Mountain
- 1991: The Tango Player
- 1991: Between Pankow and Zehlendorf
- 1992: The Mystery of the Amber Room
- 1994: Charlie & Louise - Das doppelte Lottchen
- 1994: Stockholm Marathon
- 1995: The Promise
- 1995: 5 Stunden Angst – Geiselnahme im Kindergarten (TV film)
- 1996: Gates of Fire (TV film)
- 1996: Sexy Sadie
- 1996: Father's Day
- 1996: Gefährliche Freundin (TV film)
- 1997: Der Ausbruch (TV film)
- 1997: Knockin' on Heaven's Door
- 1998: Solo for Clarinet
- 1998: The Big Mambo
- 1999: The Devil and Ms. D
- 1999: To the Horizon and Beyond
- 2000: Fandango
- 2001: Vera Brühne (TV film)
- 2002: Bibi Blocksberg
- 2002–2006: Eva Blond (TV series)
- 2003: Die fremde Frau (TV film)
- 2004: Downfall - portrayed Magda Goebbels
- 2004: Bibi Blocksberg and the Secret of the Blue Owls
- 2004: C(r)ook
- 2005: Through This Night
- 2006: Silver Wedding (TV film)
- 2006: Perfume: The Story of a Murderer
- 2006: Rage (TV film)
- 2007: According to the Plan
- 2007: An die Grenze (TV film)
- 2008: A Year Ago in Winter
- 2008: Berlin Calling
- 2009: Whiskey with Vodka
- 2009: This Is Love
- 2011: Cracks in the Shell
- 2011: No Sex Is No Option
- 2012: Home for the Weekend
- 2012: Move
- 2013: Finsterworld
- 2015: Jack
- 2017: Fack ju Göhte 3
- 2019: Lara
- since 2023: Tatort

== Recognition ==
- 1993 – 43rd Berlin International Film Festival: Berlinale Camera
- 1996 – Bavarian Film Awards, Best Actress
- 2007 – Golden Goblet of the Shanghai International Film Festival, Best Actress (for According to the Plan)
- 2015 – Theaterpreis Berlin
- 2019 – Crystal Globe, Best Actress (for Lara)
- 2024 – German Film Award, Best Actress (for Dying)
