= Vanessa Odermatt =

German politician (born 1990)

Member of the Landtag of North Rhine-Westphalia
- Incumbent
- Assumed office 1 June 2022
- Preceded by: Frank Boss
- Constituency: Mönchengladbach I

Personal details
- Born: 17 July 1990 (age 36)
- Party: Christian Democratic Union (since 2012)

Vanessa Odermatt (born 17 July 1990) is a German politician serving as a member of the Landtag of North Rhine-Westphalia since 2022. She has been a city councillor of Mönchengladbach since 2020.
