= Urs Odermatt =

Swiss author, film and stage director

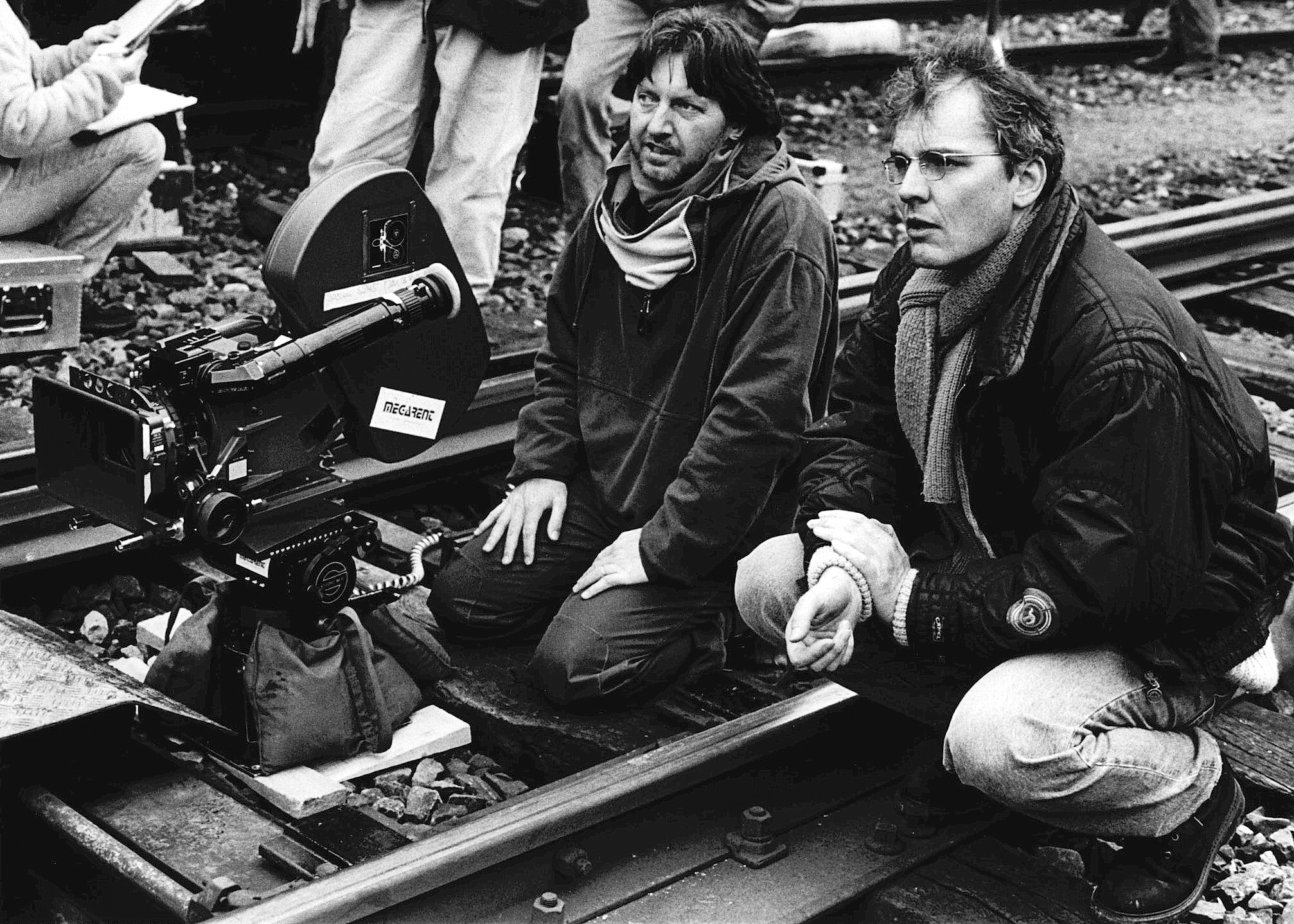
Urs Odermatt (right), Rainer Klausmann (left) during the production Constable Zumbühl

Urs Odermatt (born 28 February 1955 in Stans, canton of Nidwalden) is a Swiss film director and author.

After working for several years as a freelance journalist, film critic and photographer, Odermatt trained to be a film director and screenwriter under the two Polish pastmasters Krzysztof Kieślowski and Edward Żebrowski. He works in Germany and Switzerland as a director in film, television and theatre. In 1990 he founded the production company Nordwest Film AG with the cameraman Rainer Klausmann.

Odermatt is the son of the Nidwalden photographer Arnold Odermatt and has published his father’s work since 1993 (Springer & Winckler Galerie, Berlin; Steidl Verlag, Göttingen). In 1992 during research for his feature film Constable Zumbühl, he discovered his father’s photo archive and grouped the works together into the collections entitled Meine Welt, Karambolage, Im Dienst and In zivil.

Odermatt lives and works in Windisch in Switzerland.

== Films ==
- 2011 – Der böse Onkel (The Wicked Uncle). Feature film, from the play of the same name by Urs Odermatt. With Miriam Japp, Jörg-Heinrich Benthien, Paula Schramm, Julia Heydcamp, Stephan Dierichs, Kasia Borek, Verena Berger, Pascal Ulli, Eva Math, Johanna Leinen.
- 2009 – Dawn of Evil: Rise of the Reich. Feature film, from the play Mein Kampf by George Tabori. With Götz George, Tom Schilling, Bernd Birkhahn, Anna Unterberger, Elisabeth Orth, Wolf Bachofner, Simon Schwarz.
- 1998 – Tatort – Ein Hauch von Hollywood. TV film. With Winfried Glatzeder, Robinson Reichel, Marie-Lou Sellem, Johannes Brandrup, Götz Schubert, Dieter Mann, Martin Wuttke, Michael Gwisdek, Falk Rockstroh, Gustav Peter Wöhler, Klaus Manchen, Astrid Meyerfeldt, Bruno Cathomas.
- 1997 – Lisa Falk – Ein ganz einfacher Fall. TV series. With Ulrike Kriener, Peter Striebeck, Felix Eitner, Gustav-Peter Wöhler.
- 1997 – Lisa Falk – Der letzte Besucher. TV series. With Ulrike Kriener, Peter Striebeck, Nina Hoger, Axel Wandtke, Ueli Jäggi, Sylvie Rohrer.
- 1996 – Zerrissene Herzen. TV film. With Suzanne von Borsody, Nadja Uhl, Burghart Klaußner, Ernst Jacobi, Michael Gwisdek, Siegfried W. Kernen, Martin Horn.
- 1996 – Polizeiruf 110 – Kleine Dealer, große Träume. TV film. With Angelica Domröse, Dominic Raacke, Jürgen Vogel, Nadja Uhl, André Jung, Kathrin Angerer, Götz Otto, Ueli Jäggi, Rosemarie Fendel, Siggi Schwientek, Gottfried Breitfuss, Martin Horn. Title song: The Cranberries: Zombie.
- 1994 – Constable Zumbühl. Feature film. With Michael Gwisdek, Jürgen Vogel, Anica Dobra, Rolf Hoppe, Norbert Schwientek, Siggi Schwientek, Roeland Wiesnekker, Ueli Jäggi. ISBN 3-7165-0960-4. Colosseum Records CD CST 34.8050 LC 3387.
- 1991 – Lopper. Documentary film. Made using historic film footage by Arnold Odermatt on the early construction of Swiss motorways at Acheregg and in the Lopper tunnel.
- 1991 – Gesichter der Schweiz. Rhaeto-romansch contribution to a series of documentary films. Other films made by Kurt Gloor, Francis Reusser, Claude Goretta, Hans-Ulrich Schlumpf, Nicolas Gessner, Thomas Koerfer and others.
- 1990 – Der Tod zu Basel. TV film, from a script by Markus Kutter. With Günter Lamprecht, Dietmar Schönherr, Stefan Walz, Ueli Jäggi, Wolfram Berger, Siegfried W. Kernen, Hans-Michael Rehberg, Stephanie Glaser.
- 1988 – Gekauftes Glück (Bride of the Orient). Feature film. With Wolfram Berger, Arunotai Jitreekan, Werner Herzog, Mathias Gnädinger, Günter Meisner, Annamirl Bierbichler, Helen Vita.
- 1986 – Rotlicht!. Feature film. With Uwe Ochsenknecht, Anouschka Renzi.
- 1985 – Besuch bei der alten Dame. Short film.

Along with the cameramen, the Swiss Rainer Klausmann and Pole Piotr Lenar, the Munich composer of film music, Prof. Dr. Norbert J. Schneider (now known as Enjott Schneider) also regularly work closely with Odermatt.

== Criticism ==
Odermatt worked on two of the craziest episodes of the TV shows Tatort and Polizeiruf 110, that really took off with their "successful mix of seriousness and intelligent humour that makes a pleasant change from the monotony of crime series" (Stern 25/1996) with a "curious collection of crazy characters (...), providing the realistic main characters with a grotesque wallpaper as a background" (FAZ, 17 June 1996). "Having so much wicked humour was a rarity in the crime genre" (Der Spiegel 24/1996).

In 1989, Gekauftes Glück was regarded by the press and cinemagoers as one Switzerland’s most successful films d'auteur. Critics praised the "careful choreography of the images make a pleasant change from the usual loquaciousness of the films d’auteur in the German language" (Frankfurter Rundschau, 11 March 1989).

Constable Zumbühl was unsettling in its claustrophobic depiction of the closed society of a small village, where everybody knows everybody else and all of their business, "the world in a water droplet" (Krzysztof Kieślowski).

== Awards ==
The TV film Zerrissene Herzen (1996; camera: Piotr Lenar) was nominated in the competitions at the Baden-Badener Tage des Fernsehspiels TV awards.

Gekauftes Glück was awarded the R d'argento at the 1989 RiminiCinema Film Festival in Rimini. Die Filmbewertungsstelle Wiesbaden (Wiesbaden Film Assessment Board) commended Gekauftes Glück as "recommended" and Mein Kampf as "highly recommended".

== Theatre productions ==
=== Stage adaptations ===
- 2005 – Dieses. Kleine. Land., by Alfred Gulden. Saarländisches Staatstheater, Saarbrücken. Premiere. ISBN 3-938823-02-X.
- 2005 – Trainspotting, by Irvine Welsh. Theater St. Gallen. Swiss premiere.
- 2004 – The Crucible, by Arthur Miller. Chur Open-Air Theatre.
- 2002 – The Wicked Uncle, by Urs Odermatt. Theater Reutlingen. Premiere.
- 2002 – Die Bauchgeburt, by Rolf Kemnitzer. Saarländisches Staatstheater, Saarbrücken. Premiere.
- 2001 – Der Ignorant und der Wahnsinnige, by Thomas Bernhard. Oldenburgisches Staatstheater.
- 2000 – Closer, by Patrick Marber. Oldenburgisches Staatstheater.
- 1998 – The Cripple of Inishmaan, by Martin McDonagh. Oldenburgisches Staatstheater. German premiere.
- 1995 – Entertaining Mr Sloane, by Joe Orton. Kleines Theater, Bonn.
- 1993 – Andorra, by Max Frisch. Neues Theater, Halle (Saale).

=== Directing style ===
"...as (...) an example of the broad spectrum of directing styles in plays staged at the Saarländischen Staatstheater, by far the most unsettling are those that defy expectations of spoken drama and are reputed to be those present in the work of film and theatre director Urs Odermatt. His premieres of Rolf Kemnitzer’s Die Bauchgeburt and Alfred Gulden’s grotesque Dieses. Kleine. Land. confronted audiences with a barrage of signs and symbols conveyed through language and physical gestures. A plethora of information and impulses through the use of an edited film and video-clip aesthetic drew attention to our truncated, edited perception of reality and the nature of our connections of meanings and contextualisation as a construct of our perspective. The viewer is required to forego entirely his contemplative attitude towards that which is presented, and be consciously selective in his perception. The border with that which is experienced in a non-semantic way is crossed in this form of presentation: where energetic manifestations take the place of "meaning", where the chasm of the loss of communication and the perversion of issues of meaning are intended evoke questions about power for the audience. Odermatt's theatre of rhythmic, alienated, choral voices and expressive physicality attempts to confront that which we never see on the surface of the theatre as portrayed in the media."

From: Michael Birkner: Nur keine Komplexe – 15 Jahre Theater für das Saarland. Texte, Bilder, Daten zur Intendanz von Kurt-Josef Schildknecht.
Gollenstein Verlag, Blieskastel, ISBN 3-938823-07-0.

=== Stage design ===
For most of the theatre productions staged by Odermatt – especially the premieres – the Berlin stage designer Dirk Seesemann built the sets. He supports Odermatt's staging concepts "with his minimalist austerity" (Saarbrücker Zeitung, 21 November 2005).

=== Criticism ===
==== Dieses. Kleine. Land. ====
"[Dieses. Kleine. Land.] ...is concerned with the (preservation) and against (integration) of small countries, the delusion of one-sided notions and the persecution of personal interests. As his means of portraying this, (...) he [Odermatt] employs the grotesque and occasionally drifts off into the absurd. The play represents a huge challenge for the actors as well as for the audience." (Benno von Skopnik, Welt kompakt, 22 November 2005).

"It is not only the play [Dieses. Kleine. Land.] that is deconstructed and reassembled, but also its characters and their language. Sentences collapse time and time again like a house of cards, and new façades are created from the rubble.. With Odermatt, everything turns into a quote within a quote, which explains why choruses of Schlager songs are sung, phrases are scratched like vinyl records and scenes (like those created specially by Gulden) function as a play-within-a-play.. As a result, speech develops that is by turns choral and concerted, where the voices in the dialogue cross each other and cut each other off. A deconstructivist procedure that mixes pantomime with slapstick and absurdist theatre with concrete poetry. For a long time, this tried and tested deconstructivist ritual captivated audiences just as it had done three years ago at the Saarbrücken premiere of Rolf Kemnitzer’s Die Bauchgeburt, and reveals the dialogue-like qualities of Gulden's play." (Christoph Schreiner, Saarbrücker Zeitung, 21 November 2005).

==== Der böse Onkel ====
"Odermatt has looked around, and as an author has created a hybrid of Kroetzen's village tragedies with Ravenhill's beat-up Brit furore, then throws in Castorf's- savagery and splatter movie – an overloaded but polemical attempt. As an experienced director he has condensed his theatrical debut into a pacy example of the grotesque. Rather than descending into banal denunciation, in a host of excellently choreographed scenes, he conjures up deeply affecting dreamlike and nightmarish images onto the stage. As a result, in the play's best moments, all the controversial issues suddenly appear to be linked. The stage setting then proceeds to turn into a bizarre analysis of time, becoming a dark, glittering essay on sexuality and power." (Otto Paul Burkhardt: Liebst du mich? Ja, ich dich auch – Urs Odermatt inszeniert seinen Theatererstling als Furioso über Sexualität und Macht, Reutlinger Nachrichten, 29. April 2002).

==== Trainspotting ====
"An absurd ballet rushes across the stage, cascades of words are layered over each other and fuse together with each other, often barely comprehensible, then into a forceful, insistent crescendo of staccatto: I am, I was, everything goes by so quickly!' Cascades of words with a directness that can barely be beaten, right through to faecal language and further into a highly artificial idiom, pushed too far by precisely placed stuttering or the echo-like repetition of individual words or parts of sentences.(...) Urs Odermatt’s staging is merciless in its immediacy, even more, even more open in its pacy choreography, which demands a huge presence from the ensemble cast dressed in rustling paper with printed pages from tabloid newspapers. Merciless in its physical proximity, which doesn’t required any nudity or exposure because the inner exposure is brought out into the open." (sda, 28 April 2005).

==== Closer ====
"Men drop their trousers, women break through a huge vagina on a backdrop screen and out onto the stage. Deflowered from behind, the parted labia are flaunted right in the faces of the audience in Oldenburg. The premiere of Partick Marber’s Closer under the direction of Urs Odermatt lives up to its title and after the interval separated the theatregoers into those of a more delicate sensibility from those with a more open mind. The latter were clearly in the majority and greeted the end of the performance with huge applause." (Marijke Gerwin: Wie das Lotterleben so spielt – Sie fickten und sie schlugen sich, taz, 5. April 2000).

== Scripts, plays, audio plays ==
- 2006 – Targa Florio.
- 2004 – Fünfzehn beide.
- 2001 – Der böse Onkel.
- 1998 – Kora.
- 1991 – Wachtmeister Zumbühl.
- 1989 – St. Moritz.
- 1987 – Die Neger kommen.
- 1986 – Rotlicht!
- 1984 – Gekauftes Glück.

== Books ==
=== Author ===
- Urs Odermatt: Der böse Onkel. Play. In: Programme for the premiere. Theater Reutlingen, Reutlingen 2002.
- Urs Odermatt: Kora. Play. Theaterstückverlag, München 1998.
- Urs Odermatt: Wachtmeister Zumbühl. Script for a feature film with 79 stills photos by Arnold Odermatt. Benteli Verlag, Bern 1994. ISBN 3-7165-0960-4.
- Urs Odermatt: Schweiz – Freibrief für den Sonderfall "Ich", in: Dominik Riedo: Heidis + Peters. Eine Anthologie. Verlag Pro Libro, Luzern. ISBN 978-3-9523525-3-3.

=== Editor ===
- Arnold Odermatt: In zivil. Hors service. Off Duty. Edited by Urs Odermatt. Steidl Verlag, Göttingen 2010, ISBN 978-3-86521-796-7.
- Arnold Odermatt: Im Dienst. En service. On Duty. Edited by Urs Odermatt. Steidl Verlag, Göttingen 2006, ISBN 3-86521-271-9.
- Arnold Odermatt: Karambolage. Edited by Urs Odermatt. in German, French and English. Steidl Verlag, Göttingen 2003, ISBN 3-88243-866-5.
- Arnold Odermatt: Meine Welt. Photographien/Photographs 1939–1993. Edited by Urs Odermatt. Benteli Verlag, Bern 1993, 2001 and 2006, ISBN 3-7165-0910-8.

== Sources ==
- Markus Ehrat: 31 Lofts – Wohnen in der alten Spinnerei, ISBN 3-907496-28-0
