= Arnold Odermatt =

Swiss police photographer (1925–2021)

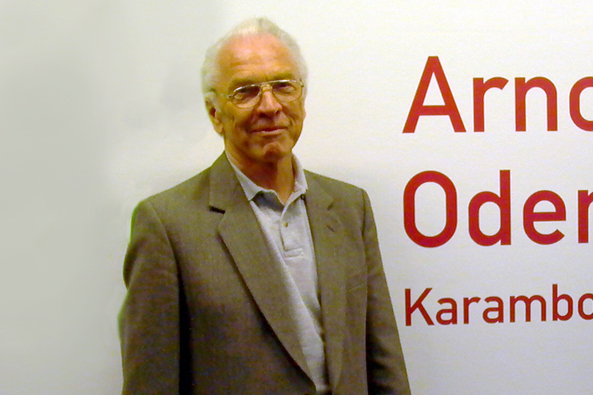

Arnold Odermatt (25 May 1925 − 19 June 2021) was a Swiss police photographer whose work spanned more than 40 years. Originally trained as a baker, he was a photographer for the Nidwalden cantonal police from 1948 until his retirement in 1990. He is best known for his eerily beautiful black and white photographs of the aftermaths of motor vehicle accidents. Odermatt joined the police in 1948 and rose to become a lieutenant, chief of the transport police, and deputy chief inspector of the Nidwalden Police before he retired.

At the beginning of the 1990s, Odermatt's photography was discovered by his son, Urs Odermatt during research for his film Constable Zumbühl, and this work became a central theme in the film's plot. Urs brought his father's works together in the working groups entitled Meine Welt, Karambolage, Im Dienst, and In zivil and has published Odermatt's work ever since, working in collaboration with the Frankfurt art historian Beate Kemfert and a gallery in Berlin—Galerie Springer & Winckler.

In 2001, Odermatt's photography was selected by Harald Szeemann to be exhibited at the 49th Venice Biennale. In 2002 James Rondeau exhibited Odermatt's work in its own right at the Art Institute of Chicago, as did Urs Stahel at the Fotomuseum Winterthur in 2004.

== Biography ==
Odermatt was born in Oberdorf, canton Nidwalden, Switzerland. He joined the Nidwalden Police in 1948. He was forced to give up his original career as a bakery and pastry chef on health grounds. As the policeman Odermatt first appeared with his Rolleiflex at the scene of an accident – to provide photos to complement the police report, people found this rather disconcerting. At that time, photography was anything other than an independent means of providing the police with evidence.

A colleague observed Odermatt as he took pictures for the force and was suspicious. He was ordered to report to his commander immediately. Odermatt managed to convince his superiors of the pioneering work he was doing. They allowed him to convert an old toilet in an observation post in Stans into a makeshift darkroom. When the observation post was moved into another building several years later, Switzerland’s first police photographer was given his own laboratory.

Odermatt's biggest role model was the famous Magnum photographer Werner Bischof. He met him once by chance, as he was on security duty on the Bürgenstock and wanted to photograph Charlie Chaplin. Odermatt's own style was characterised by sobriety and authenticity. The spartan linguistic expression of his police reports can also be found in Odermatt’s images. His craftsmanship is beyond question, nothing of note is missed by his photographic eye. In KARAMBOLAGE, his most famous series of work, you can’t see the maimed victims but you do see the ethereal, surreal sculptures of scrap metal. With the softness and melancholy of Jacques Tati, he looks at the consequences of speed and the hectic nature of modern times.

For 40 years, Odermatt captured the daily work of the Nidwalden police force. It was only rarely that the local press, the court or an insurance company were interested in his photos. It was only when his son, the film and theatre director Urs Odermatt, showed the photos for the first time at a solo exhibition in Frankfurt am Main that the art scene first became interested in his work. After the inspiring exhibition, the photo book 'Meine Welt' followed. Suddenly the everyday observations from the central Swiss province had gained the same status as those of his well-travelled predecessor, Werner Bischof.

At an early stage in his police career, when Arnold used the camera to catalogue traffic accidents, this was a revolutionary innovation in the Swiss police. If Odermatt were to turn up at a crime scene with his camera today, he could expect to be told that photography was not for him, but was instead the job of a specially trained police photographer.

== Solo exhibitions ==
- 1993 - Arnold Odermatt. Seeplatz 10, Buochs.
- 1996 - Meine Welt. Viewpoint Gallery, Salford.
- 1998 - Karambolage. Police headquarters, Frankfurt am Main.
- 2000 - Karambolagen und andere Photographien. Springer & Winckler Galerie, Berlin.
- 2001 - Carambolages. Centre de la photographie, Genf.
- 2002 - Karambolage. Museum Morsbroich, Leverkusen. ISBN 3-925520-64-3.
- 2002 - Die Biennale-Auswahl. 32 Photographien für Venedig 2001. Springer & Winckler Galerie, Berlin. ISBN 3-00-009666-3.
- 2002 - Karambolage. Centre rhénan de la photographie, Strassburg.
- 2002 - Arnold Odermatt. The Art Institute of Chicago, Chicago. Catalogue.
- 2003 - Arnold Odermatt. Washington University Gallery of Art, St. Louis. Katalog.
- 2003 - Arnold Odermatt. Paul Morris Gallery, New York.
- 2004 - Arnold Odermatt. James Kelly Contemporary, Santa Fe.
- 2004 - Arnold Odermatt. Galerie Sabine Knust, Munich.
- 2004 - Karambolagen. Photo museum Winterthur, Winterthur.
- 2004 - Karambolage. Rathaus, Fellbach.
- 2004 - Arnold Odermatt. Galería Arnés y Röpke, Madrid.
- 2004 - Kantonspolizei Nidwalden. Springer & Winckler Galerie, Berlin.
- 2005 - Arnold Odermatt. Centro Cultural Okendo, San Sebastián. ISBN 84-96431-06-1.
- 2005 - Arnold Odermatt. Museum im Bellpark, Kriens.
- 2006 - Im Dienst. Farbphotographien 1962-1990. Springer & Winckler Galerie, Berlin.
- 2008 - Focus Photographie: Arnold Odermatt. Galerie Lelong, Zurich.
- 2009 - Project room: Arnold Odermatt. Galerie Georges-Philippe & Nathalie Vallois, Paris.
- 2009 - Karambolage. Miesiąc Fotografii w Krakowie, Krakau. ISBN 978-83-928967-0-8.
- 2010 - Arnold Odermatt. Leo Koenig Inc. Projects, New York.
- 2010 - In zivil. Springer & Winckler Galerie, Berlin.
- 2010 - On Duty. Amador Gallery, New York.
- 2011 - On and Off Duty. Galerie Georges-Philippe & Nathalie Vallois, Paris.
- 2011 - Heimat. Buchmann Galerie, Berlin.
- 2012 - Arnold Odermatt. L'Été photographique de Lectoure. Lectoure, (Gascogne).
- 2012 - Arnold Odermatt. Espace d'Art Contemporain Fernet Branca, Saint-Louis (Elsass).
- 2012 - Arnold Odermatt. La Chambre, Straßburg.

== Books ==
- Urs Odermatt: Wachtmeister Zumbühl. Script for a feature film with 79 stills photographs by Odermatt. Benteli Verlag, Bern 1994. ISBN 3-7165-0960-4.
- Arnold Odermatt: Karambolage. Museum Morsbroich, Leverkusen 2002. ISBN 3-925520-64-3.
- Arnold Odermatt: Die Biennale-Auswahl. 32 Photographien für Venedig 2001. [Biennale Selection: 32 photographs for Venice 2001] With a text by Harald Szeemann. Galerie Springer & Winckler, Berlin 2002. ISBN 3-00-009666-3.
- Arnold Odermatt: Meine Welt. Photographien/Photographs 1939-1993. Edited by Urs Odermatt. Benteli Verlag, Bern 1993, 2001 und 2006. ISBN 3-7165-0910-8. Kodak-Fotobuch-Preis 1993.
- Arnold Odermatt: Karambolage. Edited by Urs Odermatt. German, French English. Steidl-Verlag, Göttingen 2003. ISBN 3-88243-866-5.
- Arnold Odermatt: Im Dienst. En service. On Duty. Edited by Urs Odermatt. Steidl Verlag, Göttingen 2006. ISBN 3-86521-271-9. German Photobook Prize 2008.
- Arnold Odermatt: In zivil. Hors service. Off Duty. Edited by Urs Odermatt. Steidl-Verlag, Göttingen 2010. ISBN 978-3-86521-796-7.
- Arnold Odermatt. With a text by Caroline Recher. Diaphane éditions, Montreuil sur Brèche 2012, ISBN 978-2-919077-12-0.
- Arnold Odermatt: Karambolage. Steidl Verlag. Göttingen 2013, ISBN 978-3-88243-866-6

== Films ==
In the 1960s Odermatt documented the early construction of the Swiss motorways in Acheregg and the Lopper tunnel, with extensive photos and 16mm black-and-white film footage. In 1991 Urs Odermatt put all of this historical film material together in the documentary film Lopper.

In the 1990s, working as a stills photographer, during filming, Odermatt worked on the feature films Rotlicht!, Gekauftes Glück und Wachtmeister Zumbühl by Urs Odermatt.
