= Abteilungsleiter (NSDAP) =

Kreis-Abteilungsleiter collar tabs, 1933–35

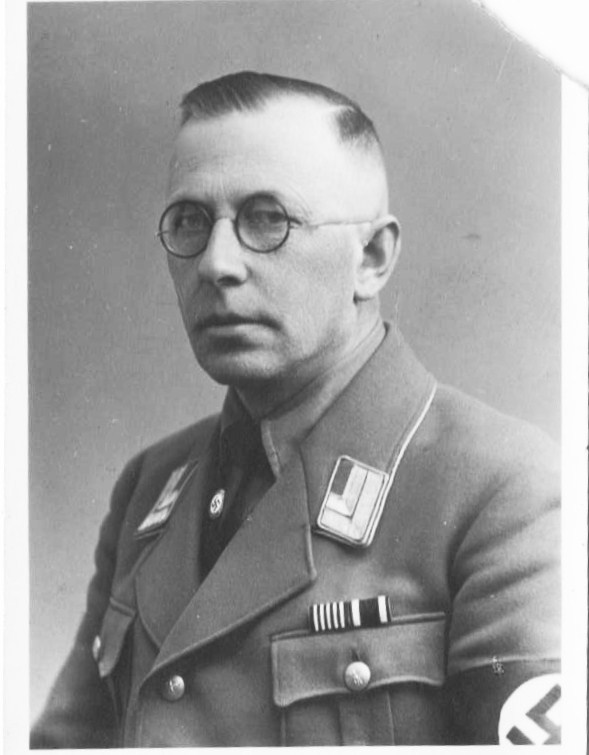
Paul Fritz Wiemann in uniform as an Abteilungsleiter

Abteilungsleiter (section leader), German for department head, was also a mid-level administrative political position of the Nazi Party, often held by staff political officers attached to various Gaue throughout Germany. The position of Abteilungsleiter was not an actual Nazi Party political rank, but a title held by a Party member in addition to their formal rank. The position was first created in 1933, after the Nazis had secured power in Germany.

A rank of Unterabteilungsleiter also existed, literally "Junior Section Leader".

From 1933 to 1939, there was no outward insignia to denote the position of Abteilungsleiter. This changed upon the outbreak of World War II, when a new system of political armbands were created to denote the position of "Department Leader" to which the former title of Abteilungsleiter was incorporated.
