= Musikexpress =

German music magazine

- Editor-in-chief: Albert Koch
- Categories: Music magazine
- Frequency: Monthly
- Total circulation: 51,836
- First issue: 1969
- Company: Axel Springer Mediahouse Berlin GmbH
- Country: Germany
- Based in: Berlin
- Language: German
- Website: musikexpress.de
- ISSN: 1618-5129
- OCLC: 1367284287

The Musikexpress is a monthly German magazine that mainly writes about the rock and pop music. In addition to detailed interviews and articles about important rock, electro, hip-hop, pop, and independent musicians, the magazine offers reviews of sound carriers, concert reports, and articles on pop literature, pop art, films, and DVDs. Each release is also accompanied by a CD covering the topics of the respective issue. The magazine can also be released at irregular intervals with extras such as 7-inch vinyl singles, books, calendars, and DVDs. Musikexpress has been published by Axel Springer Mediahouse Berlin since the editorial team moved from Munich to Berlin in 2010.
