= Michael Gwisdek =

German actor and film director (1942–2020)

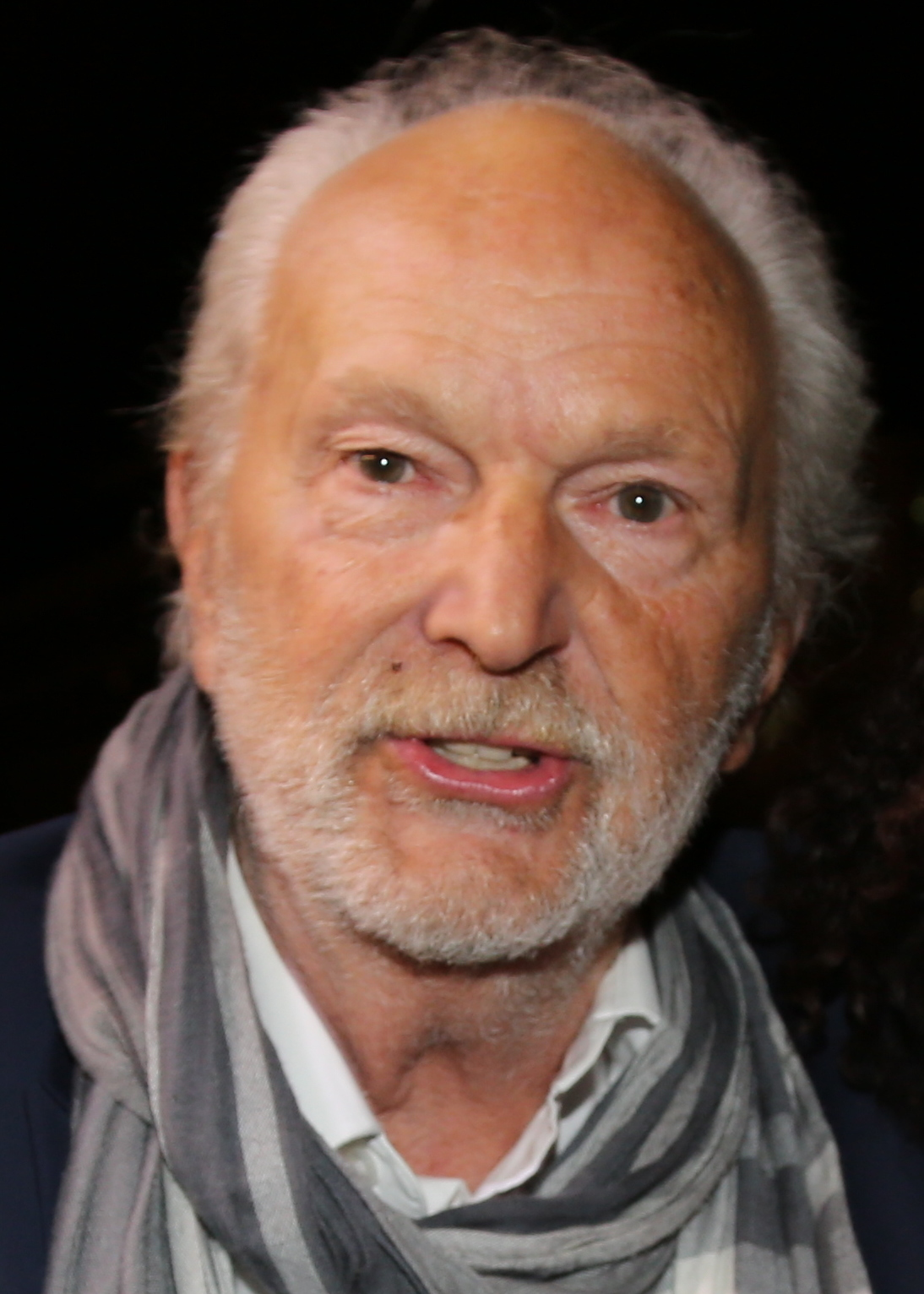
- Born: 14 January 1942; Berlin-Weissensee, Germany
- Died: 22 September 2020 (aged 78)
- Occupations: Actor; film director
- Years active: 1968–2020
- Spouse: Corinna Harfouch (m. 1985; div. 1997)
- Children: Johannes Gwisdek, Robert Gwisdek

Michael Gwisdek (14 January 1942 – 22 September 2020) was a German actor and film director.

== Career ==
He began his acting career in East Germany and has appeared in more than 130 films and television shows since 1968. His debut film as a director, Treffen in Travers, was the first East-German film screened at the 1989 Cannes Film Festival in the Un Certain Regard section. His 1998 film The Big Mambo was entered into the 48th Berlin International Film Festival. The following year, he won the Silver Bear for Best Actor at the 49th Berlin International Film Festival, for his role in the film Nightshapes.

He married the actress Corinna Harfouch in 1985 and they divorced in 1997. They had two sons together before they married; the musician Johannes Gwisdek (born 1980) and the actor Robert Gwisdek (born 1984). He married his second wife, Gabriela, shortly after divorcing Harfouch.

Gwisdek died on 22 September 2020 aged 78.

== Selected filmography ==
- Jadup and Boel (1980)
- Woman Doctors (1984)
- Sansibar oder der letzte Grund (1987)
- Just for Horror (1987- produced)
- Treffen in Travers (1988 - directed)
- Pestalozzi's Mountain (1989)
- Coming Out (1989)
- Walerjan Wrobel's Homesickness (1991)
- The Tango Player (1991)
- Das große Fest (1992, TV film)
- Constable Zumbühl (1994)
- Night Time (1998)
- The Big Mambo (1998 - directed)
- Nightshapes (1999)
- No Place to Go (2000)
- Vaya con Dios (2002)
- Good Bye, Lenin! (2003)
- Herr Lehmann (2003)
- Speer und Er (2005)
- Pornorama (2007)
- Kaifeck Murder (2009)
- Boxhagener Platz (2010)
- The Day I Was Not Born (2011)
- A Coffee in Berlin (2012)
- Shark Alarm at Müggel Lake (2013)
- The Silent Revolution (2018)
