= The State I Am In (film) =

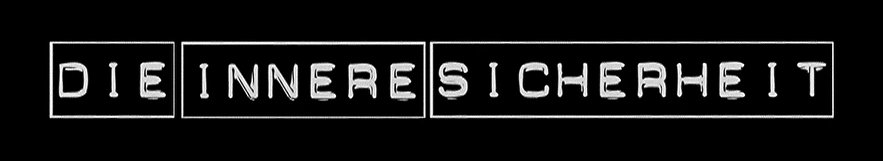
- Directed by: Christian Petzold
- Written by: Harun Farocki; Christian Petzold
- Produced by: Florian Koerner von Gustorf; Michael Weber
- Starring: Julia Hummer; Barbara Auer; Richy Müller; Bilge Bingül; Katharina Schüttler; Bernd Tauber
- Cinematography: Hans Fromm
- Edited by: Bettina Böhler
- Music by: Stefan Will
- Production companies: Schramm Film; Hessischer Rundfunk; Arte
- Release dates: 1 September 2000 (Venice Film Festival); 1 February 2001 (Germany)
- Running time: 106 minutes
- Country: Germany
- Language: German

The State I Am In (German: Die innere Sicherheit) is a 2000 German drama film directed by Christian Petzold.

== Plot ==
Fifteen-year-old Jeanne lives in Portugal with her parents, Hans and Clara, who are former members of a left-wing terrorist group and have been living as fugitives for years. Hans and Clara are making final preparations to move to Brazil, where, they tell Jeanne, the family will finally be able to live a "normal life". Jeanne chafes under her family's paranoid and restrictive lifestyle, and falls in love with Heinrich, a German surfer who tells her of his family's empty villa in Hamburg. Days later, it becomes apparent that the family's cover has been blown, and they flee to their native Germany.

Hans and Clara have little luck in securing shelter or funding from their former comrades. Finally Klaus, a former lover of Clara, tells them that he will have the money ready in three weeks. While they wait, they settle into the empty suburban villa described by Heinrich, with Jeanne making grocery runs to the city. In the city, she encounters Heinrich again, who reveals that he is actually an orphan living in a children's home near the villa. At night, Jeanne sneaks out to see Heinrich; this budding romance combined with Jeanne's shoplifting habit unsettles her parents.

Three weeks pass, but while they wait for Klaus to arrive with the money, he is apprehended by the police. Hans and Clara resolve to rob a bank in order to fund their escape. The robbery leaves a guard dead and Hans badly injured, but they get enough money to fund their passage to Brazil the next day. That evening, Jeanne returns to Heinrich and tells her that she will leave forever in the morning, confessing that her family is living underground. Surmising that Jeanne's elusive parents are the bank robbers, Heinrich notifies the police.

The next day, as they drive to the port, the family's car is run off of the road by a police commando. Jeanne emerges from the wrecked car dazed but unharmed.

== Cast ==
- Julia Hummer as Jeanne
- Barbara Auer as Clara
- Richy Müller as Hans
- Rogério Jacques as Thief
- Günther Maria Halmer as Klaus
- Bilge Bingül as Heinrich

== Production ==
Petzold and co-writer Harun Farocki reportedly took inspiration from the life of Wolfgang Grams, a former member of the Red Army Faction. They initially began writing the script in 1997, but struggled to find funding due to the portrayal of former members of the RAF. They were advised to remove these aspects of the plot in order to secure funding.

The State I Am In forms a loose trilogy with Petzold's later films Gespenster and Yella. Some have noted the plot's similarity to Sidney Lumet's Running on Empty.

== Themes ==
Petzold has stated that the film is, in part, his criticism of cinema for being incapable of dealing with contemporary issues, which is reflected in the initial issues with finding funding. Much of the plot is concerned with the family being on the run as a result of political actions from two decades prior, and how German society has changed in the intervening period. In one scene, Hans digs up a buried cache of outdated Deutsche Marks, no longer legal tender following the fall of the Berlin Wall, and he dismisses them as a "history lesson". In one scene, Jeanne joins a school group watching Alain Resnais's Holocaust documentary Night and Fog. The lack of response from the class, along with Jeanne's disinterest in her parents' cause, has been read as a comment on German culture's disengagement with politics.

== Reception ==
The film won the awards for best film and best editing at the German Film Critics Association Awards. It also won best screenplay at the Thessaloniki and grand prize at Valenciennes film festivals.

It received generally positive reviews on release. Writing in Variety, David Stratton described it as "a modest but potent suspense drama that realistically depicts an off-kilter way of life." Andreas Kern of Screen Daily wrote that Petzold's "subtle and quietly approach hits home in a no-nonsense way by dissecting the lives of his protagonists." The Guardian's Andrew Pulver was more mixed in his review from the 2001 Edinburgh Film Festival, noting that the film "is laudable on many levels" but ultimately "what makes the film hard going...is the way it asks us to spend 100 minutes in the company of such resolutely unlikable individuals."
