= Miroirs No. 3 =

2025 German drama film

- Theatrical release poster
- German: Miroirs No. 3
- Directed by: Christian Petzold
- Written by: Christian Petzold
- Produced by: Florian Koerner von Gustorf; Anton Kaiser; Michael Weber
- Starring: Paula Beer; Barbara Auer; Matthias Brandt; Enno Trebs
- Cinematography: Hans Fromm
- Edited by: Bettina Böhler
- Production companies: Schramm Film Koerner & Weber; ZDF; Arte
- Distributed by: Piffl Medien
- Release dates: 17 May 2025 (Cannes); 18 September 2025
- Running time: 86 minutes
- Country: Germany
- Language: German
- Box office: $1 million

Miroirs No. 3, released in Australia and New Zealand as Mirrors No. 3, is a 2025 German drama film written and directed by Christian Petzold. It follows Laura (Paula Beer), a depressed music student, who after suffering an accident takes shelter in an idyllic home in the German countryside. It also stars Barbara Auer, Matthias Brandt and Enno Trebs.

The film had its world premiere at the Directors' Fortnight section of the 2025 Cannes Film Festival on 17 May 2025. It was theatrically released in Germany on 18 September by Piffl Medien.

== Plot ==
Laura, a depressed music student at the Berlin University of the Arts, falls ill while on a weekend trip to Uckermark. Her boyfriend intends to drop her off at the nearest train station but loses control of their car on the way. He is killed in the accident, while Laura only suffers minor injuries.

Betty, a solitary country woman who witnessed the accident, takes Laura in and cares for her. Finding refuge and support, Laura decides to stay while she recovers and helps with the housework. Betty invites her husband, Richard, and her son, Max, to dinner at the country house, though they only agree to attend with great reluctance and to Laura's confusion, accuses Betty of acting inappropriately.

Laura eventually befriends the two, who run a car repair shop down the road. They come by Betty's house to help fix the faucet, the dishwasher and the bicycles, and Laura increasingly notices the odd ways they behave around each other. A tuner fixes the out-of-tune piano at the house, allowing Laura to practice after a long break, which greatly affects Betty. The dishwasher eventually breaks down one day. Laura goes to Max for help, but the visit is interrupted by Richard, who asks Laura to return to Betty immediately as the latter is worried sick.

While Richard and Betty are on a trip to Berlin to purchase a new dishwasher, Laura visits Max at the repair shop again. Max attempts to tell Laura something but finds himself unable to. When Laura lightly touches his arm, he violently pushes her away. Laura storms off while Max cries out to her, telling her that she will never replace his sister Jelena, whose suicide devastated the family.

Shocked and disgusted that Betty in fact saw her as her deceased daughter, Laura decided to leave immediately and asks her father to pick her up, leading Betty to suffer a breakdown. Some time later, Betty discovers that Laura has a public audition at the university and decides to go, against her family's suggestion that Laura might be disturbed by their attendance. Laura spots the family in the audience and performs her piece (the third movement of the piano suite Miroirs by Maurice Ravel) perfectly. Back home, Betty and her family work happily around the house. Elsewhere, Laura smiles in recognition.

== Cast ==
- Paula Beer as Laura
- Barbara Auer as Betty
- Matthias Brandt as Richard
- Enno Trebs as Max
- Philip Froissant as Jakob
- Hendrik Heutmann as Michael
- Christian Koerner as Laura's Father
- Victoire Laly as Debbi

== Production ==
In August 2024, it was announced principal photography had commenced, with Christian Petzold directing the film, with Paula Beer, Barbara Auer, Matthias Brandt and Enno Trebs set to star.

It marks Beer's fourth collaboration in a row with Petzold, following Transit (2018), Undine (2020) and Afire (2023).

== Release ==
It had its world premiere at the 2025 Cannes Film Festival in the Directors' Fortnight section on 17 May 2025. Originally acquired for distribution in North America by Metrograph Pictures in August 2024, distribution rights for the U.S. were later sold to 1-2 Special in June 2025.
