= Bettina Böhler =

German film editor

Bettina Böhler (born 1960 in Freiburg im Breisgau) is a German film editor.

== Career ==
Böhler began her professional journey at the age of nineteen as an assistant editor working with 35-mm film.

Working as an editor since 1985, Böhler has edited more than 90 feature films, documentaries, and television movies. Many of these films have received acclaim at international film festivals such as Cannes, Venice, and Berlin.

She has been nominated several times for the German Lola Award: 2012 for her collaboration with director Christian Petzold on Barbara, 2017 for Wild (director Nicolette Krebitz), 2020 for her own documentary „Schlingensief - A Voice that shook the Silence“ and 2022 for Krebitz’ AEIOU.

In recognition of her outstanding contributions to European film, she was awarded the Bremen Film Prize in 2007.

Böhler is a member of the Academy of Motion Picture Arts and Sciences, the European Film Academy and the Academy of Arts, Berlin.

== Selected filmography ==
- 1986: Du mich auch - director: Dani Levy
- 1991: The Blue Hour - director: Marcel Gisler
- 1991: Taiga (documentary film) - director: Ulrike Ottinger
- 1992: Langer Gang - director: Yılmaz Arslan
- 1992: Terror 2000 - director: Christoph Schlingensief
- 1994: The Blue One - director: Lienhard Wawrzyn
- 1995: Cuba Libre - director: Christian Petzold
- 1996: Gefährliche Freundin - director: Hermine Huntgeburth
- 1997: F. est un salaud - director: Marcel Gisler
- 1998: Drachenland - director: Florian Gärtner
- 1998: Places in Cities - director: Angela Schanelec
- 2000: The State I Am In - director: Christian Petzold
- 2002: Khamosh Pani - Silent Waters - director: Sabiha Sumar
- 2002: Wolfsburg - director: Christian Petzold
- 2003: Marseille - director: Angela Schanelec
- 2003: My Friend Henry - director: Auli Mantila
- 2004: Ghosts - director: Christian Petzold
- 2005: Fremde Haut - director: Angelina Maccarone
- 2006: Sehnsucht - director: Valeska Grisebach
- 2006: It Started Well (documentary film) - Director: Susanna Salonen
- 2006: Yella - director: Christian Petzold
- 2008: Germany 09 - "The Unfinished" - director: Nicolette Krebitz
- 2008: Jerichow - director: Christian Petzold
- 2008: Pomegranates and Myrrh (Al mor wa al rumman) - director: Najwa Najjar
- 2009: Lulu & Jimi - Director: Oskar Roehler
- 2010: Jew Suss: Rise and Fall - director: Oskar Roehler
- 2011: The Look - Charlotte Rampling (cinema documentary) - director: Angelina Maccarone
- 2012: Barbara - director: Christian Petzold
- 2012: Hannah Arendt - director: Margarethe von Trotta
- 2013: Gold - director: Thomas Arslan
- 2013: Rosie - director: Marcel Gisler
- 2014: Patong Girl - director: Susanna Salonen
- 2014: Phoenix - director: Christian Petzold
- 2017: Axolotl Overkill - director: Helene Hegemann
- 2018: Transit - director: Christian Petzold
- 2019: A Regular Woman - director: Sherry Hormann
- 2020: Undine - director: Christian Petzold
- 2023: Afire - director: Christian Petzold
- 2024: September Says - director: Ariane Labed
- 2025: Miroirs No. 3 - director: Christian Petzold

=== As director and editor ===
- 2020: Schlingensief - A Voice that Shook the Silence (cinema documentary)

== Awards and honours ==
- 2000: German Editing Award for The State I Am In
- 2001: German Film Critics' Award for The State I Am In
- 2007: Bremen Film Prize for Yella
- 2007: Femina Film Award for Yella
- 2012: German Film Critics' Award for Barbara
- 2012: Nomination for the German Film Award in the category Best Editing for Barbara"
- 2017: Nomination for the German Film Award in the category Best Editing for Wild
- 2021: Bavarian Film Award for Schlingensief - A Voice that Shook the Silence
- 2021: German Camera Award for Schlingensief - A Voice that Shook the Silence
