= Grimme-Preis =

German television award

- Location: Theater Marl, Marl, North Rhine-Westphalia
- Country: Germany
- Presented by: Grimme Institut
- Formerly called: Adolf-Grimme-Preis
- Website: grimme-preis.de

The Grimme-Preis (Grimme Award), formerly known as the Adolf-Grimme-Preis, is one of the most prestigious German television awards. It is named after the first general director of Nordwestdeutscher Rundfunk, Adolf Grimme. The Grimme Institute also awards the Grimme Online Award and the Deutscher Radiopreis (German Radio Award).

== History ==
The award, founded as the Adolf-Grimme-Preis in 1964, is named after the first general director of Nordwestdeutscher Rundfunk, Adolf Grimme. The award was endowed by the German Community College association and is granted to productions "that use the specific possibilities of the medium of television in an extraordinary manner and at the same time can serve as examples regarding content and method".

It was renamed the Grimme-Preis in 2011.

One of the first award winners was Gerd Oelschlegel in 1964, for his TV movie Sonderurlaub, about a failed escape from the German Democratic Republic.

Rainer Werner Fassbinder received an honorable mention in 1974 for his film World on a Wire.

By 2014, German veteran director Dominik Graf had received ten awards for his various films. Danish director Lars von Trier was awarded a Grimme-Preis in 1996 for his miniseries The Kingdom. Director Christian Petzold has been awarded the prize twice, for his films Wolfsburg (2003) and Something to Remind Me (2001). In 2016, Edward Berger's series Deutschland 83 was one of the four recipients in the principal "fiction" category. The TV series Dark became in 2018 the first Netflix show to receive the award.

== Description and significance ==
The award ceremony takes place annually at Theater Marl in Marl, North Rhine-Westphalia, and is hosted by the Grimme-Institut.

In addition to the Grimme Award, the institute also grants the Grimme Online Award and the German Radio Award (de).

The Grimme Award has been referred to in Kino magazine as the "German TV Oscar".

== Notable laureates ==
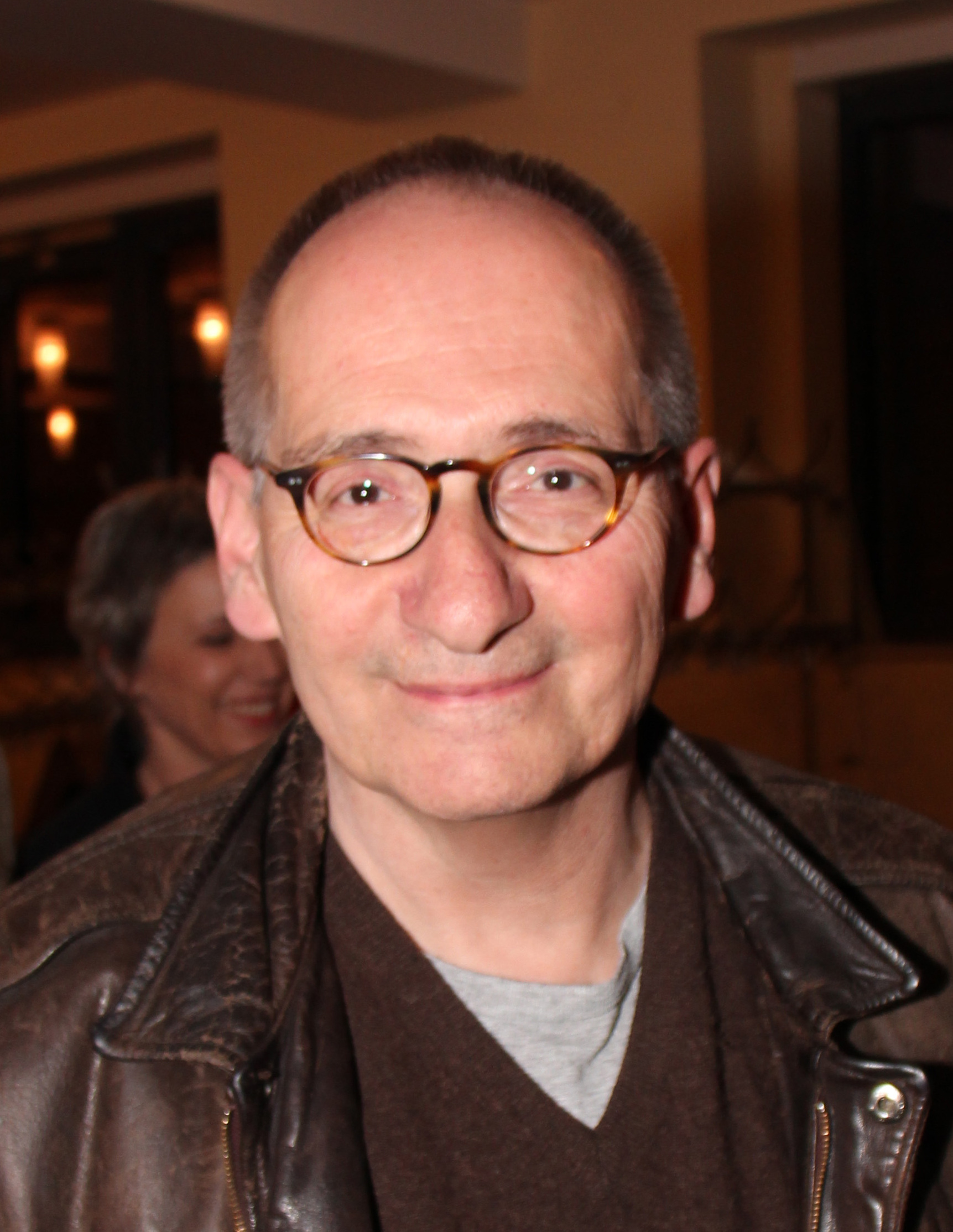
2011: Dominik Graf

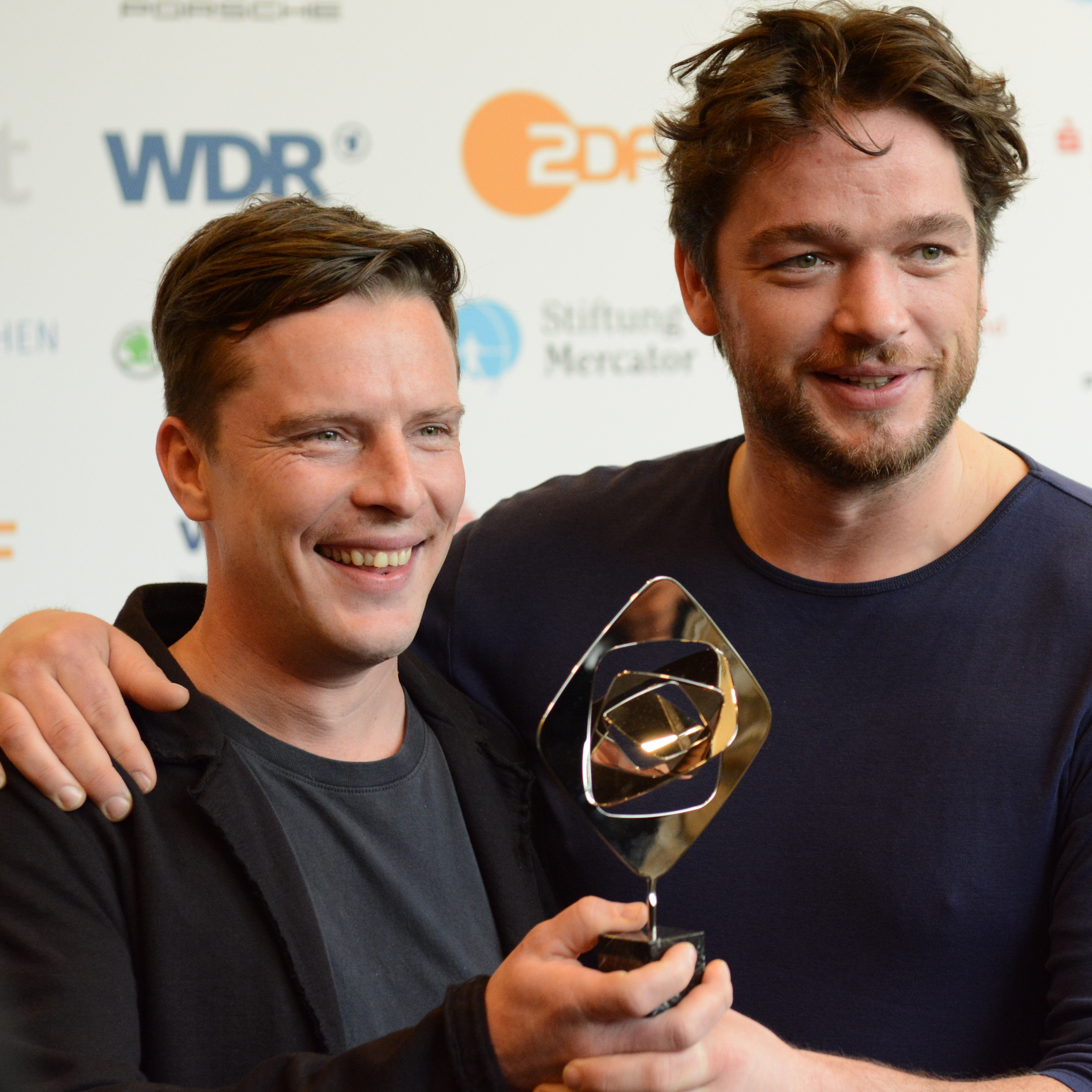
2014: actors Florian Panzner and Ronald Zehrfeld

- Hans Abich (1978)
- Mario Adorf (1994)
- Gabriel Barylli (1999)
- Ben Becker (1993, 1995)
- Jurek Becker (1987, 1988)
- Martin Benrath (1999)
- Edward Berger (several)
- Bernd das Brot (2004)
- Thomas Bernhard (1972)
- Frank Beyer (1991)
- Alfred Biolek (1983)
- Jan Böhmermann (2014, 2016)
- Suzanne von Borsody (1981)
- Heinrich Breloer (1981, 1983, 1984, 1988, 1992, 1994, 2002)
- Nadeshda Brennicke (2000)
- Vicco von Bülow (1968, 1973)
- Axel Corti (1985, 1987, 1995)
- Gerhard Delling (2000, together with Günter Netzer)
- Renan Demirkan (1990)
- Helmut Dietl (1987, 1988)
- Hoimar von Ditfurth (1968, 1974)
- Olli Dittrich (1995, 2003, 2005, 2016)
- Elfie Donnelly (1979)
- Tankred Dorst (1970)
- Ruth Drexel (1989)
- Klaus Emmerich (1984, 1990)
- Anke Engelke (1999, 2003)
- Rainer Werner Fassbinder (1974)
- Herbert Feuerstein (1994)
- Veronica Ferres (2002)
- Helmut Fischer (1990)
- Veronika Fitz (1990)
- Jürgen Flimm (1991)
- Nina Franoszek (1998)
- Jantje Friese (2018, together with Baran bo Odar)
- Bruno Ganz (1999)
- Martina Gedeck (1998, 2002)
- Götz George (1989, 1996)
- Dominik Graf (1997, 1998, 1999, 2003, 2006, 2007, 2008, 2010, 2011, 2012)
- Herbert Grönemeyer (1988)
- Heinz Haber (1965, 1967)
- Josef Hader (2010)
- Peter Hamm (1978)
- Corinna Harfouch (1997)
- Elke Heidenreich (1985)
- Jürgen Hentsch (2002)
- Dieter Hildebrandt (1976, 1983, 1986, 2004)
- Werner Höfer (1967, 1982)
- Jürgen Holtz (1990)
- Jörg Hube (1992, 1993)
- Walter Jens (1984)
- Helmut Käutner (1968)
- Mauricio Kagel (1970, 1971)
- Oliver Kalkofe (1996)
- Peter Keglevic (2002)
- Otto Kelmer (1993)
- Hape Kerkeling (1991)
- Heinar Kipphardt (1965)
- Marianne Koch (1976)
- Sebastian Koch (2002)
- Oliver Korittke (2000)
- Lars Kraume (2000)
- Nicolette Krebitz (1994, 1995)
- Peter Krieg (1981, 1983)
- Manfred Krug (1987, 1988)
- Hans-Joachim Kulenkampff (1985)
- Stefan Kurt (1997, 1999)
- Michael Lentz (1983,1986)
- Jürgen von der Lippe (1994, 2007)
- Lyrikline.org (2005)
- Klaus Löwitsch (1998)
- Peter Lustig (1980,1982)
- Bjarne Mädel (2012, 2013, 2022)
- Armin Maiwald (1988)
- Tobias Moretti (1999, 2002)
- Armin Mueller-Stahl (2002)
- Günter Netzer (2000, together with Gerhard Delling)
- Christine Neubauer (1992, 1999)
- Jennifer Nitsch (1995)
- Baran bo Odar (2018, together with Jantje Friese)
- Leonie Ossowski (1973, 1980)
- Peter Patzak (1985)
- Dieter Pfaff (1996)
- Michael Pfleghar (1975)
- Wolfgang Petersen (1978)
- Christian Petzold (2003, 2005)
- Ulrich Plenzdorf (1995)
- Jindrich Polak (1981, 1993)
- Gerhard Polt (1981, 1983)
- Will Quadflieg (1994)
- Sophie Rois (2002)
- Gernot Roll (1982, 1985, 1993, 2000)
- Lea Rosh (1983, 1985)
- Udo Samel (1987)
- Otto Sander (1995)
- Hans-Christian Schmid (1998)
- Harald Schmidt (1992, 1997, 2002)
- Rolf Schübel (1970, 1972, 1986, 1990)
- Walter Sedlmayr (1973)
- Eyal Sivan (2001)
- Walter Sittler (1998)
- Martin Sonneborn (2014)
- Oliver Stritzel (1996)
- Katharina Thalbach (1997)
- Robert Thalheim (2011)
- Lars von Trier (1996)
- Ulrich Tukur (2000)
- Dana Vávrová (1983)
- Bernhard Wicki (1988)
- Peter Zadek (1970, 1972)
- Helmut Zenker (1985)
- Eduard Zimmermann (1967)

== In literature ==
In Look Who's Back by Timur Vermes, a novel in which Hitler awakens in the 21st century and becomes a comedian, the Grimme Prize is awarded to Hitler.
