= Sven Pippig =

German actor (1963-2013)

- Born: 27 May 1963; Hof, West Germany
- Died: 25 September 2013 (aged 50); Hof, Germany
- Occupation: Actor
- Years active: 1993–2013

Sven Pippig (27 May 1963 – 25 September 2013) was a German actor. He appeared in more than sixty films from 1993 to 2013.

== Selected filmography ==
Year	Title	Role	Notes
2012	Lore	Bauer	
2010	Henri 4		
2009	Lilly the Witch: The Dragon and the Magic Book		
2006	Four Minutes		
2003	Wolfsburg		
2002	FeardotCom	Henry	
2001	Something to Remind Me	Blum	TV
