= Pelican Blood =

Pelican Blood may refer to:

- Pelican Blood (2010 film), a British drama directed by Karl Golden
- Pelican Blood (2019 film), a German drama directed by Katrin Gebbe
