= Benno Fürmann =

German actor

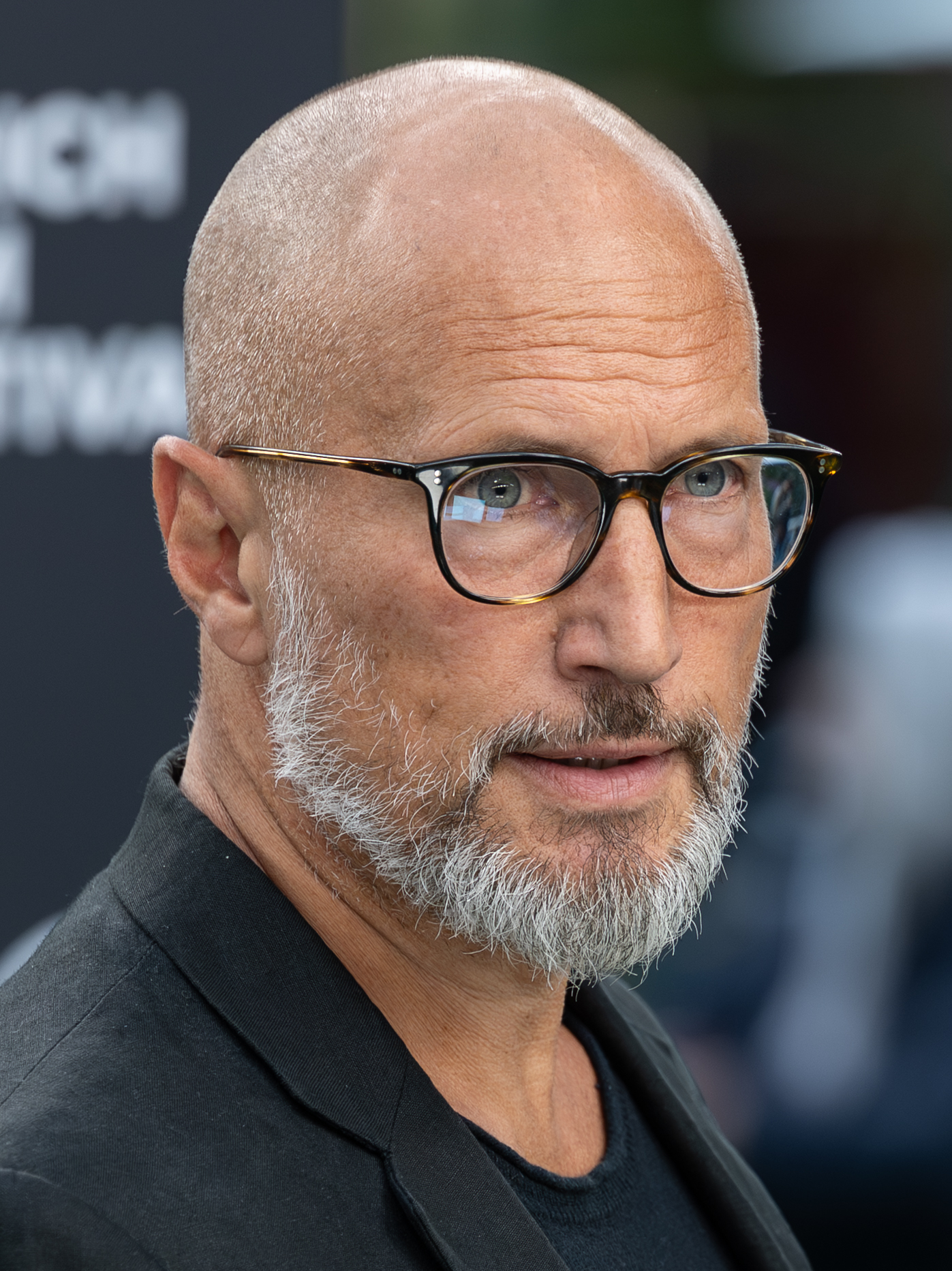
- Benno Fürmannn on the Green Carpet at the 2025 Zurich Film Festival
- Born: 17 January 1972 (age 53); West Berlin, West Germany
- Occupation: Actor

Benjamin "Benno" Fürmann (German: [ˈbɛ.no ˈfyːɐ̯ˌman]; born 17 January 1972) is a German film and television actor. He played lead roles in the 2008 film The North Face (where he played Toni Kurz), and Jerichow. He appeared in In Darkness, and was the voice of Puss in Boots in the Shrek franchise's German dubbing.

== Life and work ==
Fürmann was born in Berlin-Kreuzberg. By the time he was 15 both his parents had died. At 17, he had a serious accident while train surfing, and had to spend six weeks in the hospital. Fürmann left school after his Mittlere Reife and worked as a waiter and a bouncer. In 1991 he went to New York City and studied acting at the Lee Strasberg Theatre Institute.

Fürmann has a daughter and lives in Berlin.

== Awards ==
- 1999 German Television Award Best Actor in a Leading Role for The Bubi Scholz Story
- 2000 Bavarian Film Awards, Best Actor

== Filmography ==
- 1992: Die ungewisse Lage des Paradieses
- 1993: Blame It on the Bossa Nova (TV Movie) (with Beate Abraham, Muriel Baumeister) - Little Joe
- 1993: Durst - Schüler
- 1993: Simply Love (with Regula Grauwiller, Uwe Ochsenknecht) - Mamba
- 1995: California Convertible
- 1996: The First Time (TV Movie) (with Lavinia Wilson) - Ike
- 1998: The Bubi Scholz Story (TV Movie) (with Götz George, Nicolette Krebitz) - Gustav 'Bubi' Scholz - jung
- 1998: Kiss My Blood - John
- 1998: Candy - Robert
- 1998: The Polar Bear (with Til Schweiger, Karina Krawczyk) - Fabian
- 1999: Annaluise & Anton - Carlos
- 1999: St. Pauli Night - Johnny
- 1999: 'Ne günstige Gelegenheit - Gosbert Klee
- 2000: Anatomy (with Franka Potente) - Hein
- 2000: Trust Me (with Christiane Paul, Erdal Yıldız) - Nils
- 2000: Kanak Attack - Der Neue
- 2000: The Princess and the Warrior (with Franka Potente, Joachim Król) - Bodo
- 2001: Jeans
- 2001: High Score (TV Movie) - Lars Schelling
- 2002: Naked (with Heike Makatsch, Jürgen Vogel, Alexandra Maria Lara) - Felix
- 2002: Wolfsburg (with Nina Hoss) - Philipp Gerber
- 2003: My House in Umbria (TV Movie) (with Maggie Smith) - Werner
- 2003: The Order (alternative title: The Sin Eater) (with Heath Ledger) - William Eden
- 2004: Shrek 2 - Puss in Boots (German Dub)
- 2004: Dark Kingdom: The Dragon King (TV Movie) (with Alicia Witt) - Eric / Siegfried
- 2005: Ghosts (with Julia Hummer) - Oliver
- 2005: Joyeux Noël (with Diane Kruger and Daniel Brühl) - Nikolaus Sprink
- 2006: Wild Chicks - Lehrer Grünbaum
- 2006: Storm Tide (TV Movie) - Jürgen Urban
- 2006: Crusade in Jeans - Thaddeus
- 2007: Wild Chicks in Love - Lehrer Grünbaum
- 2007: Shrek the Third - Puss in Boots (German Dub)
- 2007: Pornorama (with Tom Schilling) - Freddie
- 2007: Survivre avec les loups - Reuven
- 2007: Why Men Don't Listen and Women Can't Read Maps - Jan Rietmüller
- 2008: Speed Racer (with Emile Hirsch and John Goodman) - Inspector Detector
- 2008: Mutant Chronicles - Lt. Maximillian von Steiner
- 2008: North Face (with Johanna Wokalek and Ulrich Tukur) - Toni Kurz
- 2008: Jerichow - Thomas
- 2009: The Wild Chicks and Life - Lehrer Grünbaum
- 2009: Germany 09 - Herr Feierlich (segment "Feierlich reist")
- 2009: Kaifeck Murder (with Alexandra Maria Lara) - Marc Barenberg
- 2009: Mullewapp - Johnny Mauser (voice)
- 2009: Farewell - Agent fédéral allemand 1
- 2009: Überlebensstrategien für das neue Jahrtausend - Werner Krupp
- 2009: Dinosaurier – Gegen uns seht ihr alt aus! - Jo Schwertlein
- 2010: Devil's Kickers - Moritz' Vater
- 2010: Shrek Forever After - Puss in Boots (German Dub)
- 2010: The Frontier - Rolf Haas
- 2011: In Darkness - Mundek Margulies
- 2011: Puss in Boots - Puss in Boots (German Dub)
- 2011: Tom Sawyer - Injun Joe
- 2012: Lara
- 2013: Shark Alarm at Müggel Lake - Der reiche Mann von Friedrichshagen
- 2013: The Blind Spot - Ulrich Chaussy
- 2013: The Almost Perfect Man - Ulf
- 2014: Fiddlesticks - Animal Catcher
- 2014: A Hitman's Solitude Before the Shot - Koralnik
- 2014: Bright Night - Bernd
- 2015: Von glücklichen Schafen - Klaus
- 2015: Survivor - Pavlou
- 2015: Heil - Sven Stanislawski
- 2016: Volt - Volt
- 2017: Do You Sometimes Feel Burned Out and Empty? - Leopold
- 2017-2022: Babylon Berlin (TV Series) - Oberst Wendt
- 2018: Intrigo: Death of an Author - David
- 2019: Get Lucky - Martin
- 2019: Hanna - Dieter
- 2022: Puss in Boots: The Last Wish - Puss in Boots (German Dub)
