= Yella (film) =

- Theatrical release poster
- Directed by: Christian Petzold
- Written by: Christian Petzold
- Produced by: Florian Koerner von Gustorf; Michael Weber
- Starring: Nina Hoss; Devid Striesow; Hinnerk Schönemann; Burghart Klaußner; Barbara Auer; Christian Redl; Michael Wittenborn; Wanja Mues; Martin Brambach; Joachim Nimtz; Peter Benedict; Peter Knaack; Selin Bademsoy
- Cinematography: Hans Fromm
- Edited by: Bettina Böhler
- Music by: Stefan Will
- Production companies: Schramm Film Koerner & Weber
- Distributed by: Piffl Medien
- Release date: 13 September 2007
- Running time: 89 minutes
- Country: Germany
- Language: German
- Box office: $999,588 (Worldwide)

Yella is a 2007 German drama-thriller film written and directed by Christian Petzold and starring Nina Hoss. The film is an unofficial remake of the 1962 American film Carnival of Souls. Yella premiered at the 57th Berlin International Film Festival where Hoss won the Silver Bear for Best Actress award.

== Plot ==
Yella Fichte, newly separated from her abusive husband and business partner Ben, tells her father that she is leaving her native Wittenberge for an accounting job in Hanover. Ben insists on giving her a ride to the train station. She reluctantly agrees. When she again rebuffs his pleas for her to return, he refuses to let her out of the car and drives off of a bridge. Both emerge from the car unscathed, and Yella leaves her unconscious husband on the riverbank in order to catch her train.

Yella checks in at a business hotel in Hanover, where a venture capitalist, Philipp, suggests that she becomes his assistant. She gives a noncommittal reply. The next day, Yella arrives at her workplace, only to find that the man who hired her no longer works for the company. She retrieves a billfold from his former office for him, but is only rewarded by a crude pass, which she rejects. Exhausted and planning to return to Wittenberge, she falls asleep in her hotel room with the door open.

Philipp wakes her up and renews his offer, which she accepts. Thanks to her bookkeeping acumen, she becomes Philipp's assistant in his aggressive venture capital negotiations, the profits of which he skims for his own purposes. Meanwhile, Ben stalks Yella. When Philipp gives her €100,000 for a €75,000 bank deposit, she pockets the difference, hoping to bribe the indebted Ben into leaving her alone. Philipp catches her in the act, but forgives her, and they begin an affair after Philipp stymies a kidnapping attempt by Ben.

Philipp is fired from his firm after news of his scam reaches management. Philipp admits that he was using the scam's profits to invest in a new Cork-incorporated oil drilling firm which he predicts will be wildly profitable, but is now €200,000 short. She visits the home of one of the pair's former victims, Dr. Gunthen, to blackmail the rest of the money out of him; he insists he cannot afford it. Gunthen fails to deliver at the agreed-upon time and place, and the pair goes back to his house, where they find him drowned in the backyard pond.

Yella, crying, drifts off in the backseat of a taxi. When she wakes up, she is back in the driver's seat of Ben's car as he prepares to drive off the bridge. This time, she does not attempt to stop him. Later, Wittenberge police recover Yella and Ben's lifeless bodies from the crash site.

As in Carnival of Souls, inconsistencies manifest themselves over the course of the film which suggest that the plot is merely Yella's imagination racing as she drowns in the initial crash. These include:

- Ben's initial ride offer and his first kidnapping attempt in Hanover are both interrupted by sonic booms.
- Yella has recurring visions of a crow flying through the willow leaves above the crash site.
- Upon arriving in Hanover, the bedraggled Yella stares at an affluent family in their driveway, which is the same one she later attempts to blackmail.
- Both Ben and Philipp are repeatedly seen listening to "Road to Cairo" by Julie Driscoll and David Ackles.
- While waiting for the payment from Dr. Gunthen and unaware that he is drowned at home, Yella momentarily sees him, sopping wet, through a window.

== Cast ==
- Nina Hoss - Yella Fichte
- Devid Striesow - Philipp
- Hinnerk Schönemann - Ben
- Burghart Klaußner - Dr. Gunthen
- Barbara Auer - Barbara Gunthen
- Christian Redl - Yella's father
- Michael Wittenborn - Dr. Schmidt-Ott
- Wanja Mues - Sprenger
- Martin Brambach - Dr. Fritz
- Joachim Nimtz - Prietzel
- Peter Benedict - Dr. Friedrich's lawyer Oliver
- Peter Knaack - official receiver
- Selin Bademsoy - Dr. Gunthen's daughter

== Release ==
=== Home media ===
Yella was released on DVD by Artificial Eye on January 28, 2008. It was later released by Cinema Guild on March 31, 2009.

== Reception ==
On review aggregator Rotten Tomatoes, Yella holds an approval rating of 81%, based on 53 reviews, and an average rating of 6.57/10. Its consensus reads, "Chilly and haunting, Yella's atmosphere gets under the skin."

Roger Ebert praised the film awarding it 3.5 out of 4 stars stating, "The writer-director, Christian Petzold, uses a spare, straightforward visual style for the most part, except for those cutaways to trees blowing in the wind whenever we heard the harsh bird cry. He trusts his story and characters. And he trusts us to follow the business deals and become engrossed in the intrigue. I did." Ebert also praised male leads Striesow and Schoenemann calling the similarities of both characters' physical presences as being "unsettling". Stephen Holden from The New York Times gave the film a positive review, praising the film's symbolism, atmosphere, and Hoss' performance; writing, "Yella is the kind of movie that tantalizes the mind with possibilities without solving the puzzle." Time Out awarded the film four out of five stars, calling it "an expertly crafted thriller which offers a pessimistic, though deeply rewarding, glimpse of a society being haunted by its own past." Walter Addiego of the San Francisco Chronicle praised the film's atmosphere, Petzold's direction, and Hoss' performance. Peter Bradshaw of The Guardian rated the film four out of five stars, calling it "exquisitely frigid, menacing, disquieting, with a storyline that keeps you off-balance, marred only by a slightly hackneyed dénouement".
