= The Blue One =

1994 film

- Directed by: Lienhard Wawrzyn
- Written by: Lienhard Wawrzyn
- Produced by: Gebhard Henke
- Starring: Manfred Krug
- Cinematography: Martin Kukula
- Edited by: Bettina Böhler
- Release date: February 17, 1994
- Running time: 96 minutes
- Country: Germany
- Language: German

The Blue One (German: Der Blaue) is a 1994 German drama film written and directed by Lienhard Wawrzyn. It was entered into the 44th Berlin International Film Festival.

== Cast ==
- Manfred Krug as Otto Skrodt
- Ulrich Mühe as Karl 'Kalle' Kaminski
- Meret Becker as Isabelle Skrodt
- Klaus Manchen as Führungsoffizier Werner
- Marijam Agischewa as Mandy Skrodt
- Hanns Zischler as Minister
- Margret Völker as Briefträgerin
- Jean Claude Mawila as Martin, Isabelles Freund
- Ralf Hirsch as Archivar
- Lienhard Wawrzyn as Stasi-Oberst Baum
- Michael Christian as General Pohlschröder
- Anette Hellwig as Heidi Pohlschröder
- Hanna Thiele as Frau des Ministers
