= Four Minutes =

- The German theatrical poster
- Directed by: Chris Kraus
- Written by: Chris Kraus
- Produced by: Alexandra Kordes, Meike Kordes
- Starring: Monica Bleibtreu; Hannah Herzsprung; Sven Pippig; Richy Müller
- Cinematography: Judith Kaufmann
- Music by: Annette Focks
- Distributed by: EuropaCorp Distribution; Senator International
- Release dates: June 23, 2006 (Shanghai International Film Festival); February 1, 2007 (Germany)
- Running time: 112 minutes
- Country: Germany
- Language: German

Four Minutes (German: Vier Minuten) is a 2006 German existentialist drama film directed by Chris Kraus starring Hannah Herzsprung, as a disturbed piano-playing genius imprisoned for murder and Monica Bleibtreu, as her 80-year-old piano teacher, with Richy Müller and Sven Pippig as prison wards.

== Plot ==
Traude Krueger (Bleibtreu) is working as a piano teacher in a women's prison. While selecting new students, she meets Jenny von Loeben (Herzsprung). When she tells her she can't take any lessons because her hands are too rough and she is uncooperative, Jenny becomes enraged and almost kills the prison guard, Mütze (Pippig), also one of Krueger's students. Then she starts playing the piano. Krueger listens from the hallway and, impressed by her talent, later offers Jenny lessons, but requires absolute obedience, including eating a sheet of paper. She tells Jenny never to play "that kind of negro-music" again.

Jenny's adoptive father wanted to turn her into a Mozart-like child prodigy when she was young, but when she resisted going to further contests, he raped her. Krueger plans to have her compete again. While practicing, some inmates become jealous of Jenny, who doesn't seem to get punished for beating up the guard. Some of the prison personnel oppose giving her the freedom to play the piano. However, the prison director wants positive media attention for his prison.

Jenny reaches the finals of a piano competition for players age 21 and under. Mütze transfers her to the cell of her rival inmates. They strap her hands to the bed with some cloth and set them on fire. Jenny severely wounds one of the culprits, and she is forbidden to enter the competition. Krueger learns that Mütze deliberately set up the conflict and she confronts him. Krueger resigns, and takes her piano. Mütze helps Jenny escape from prison with the piano so she can play at the competition.

Jenny learns that Krueger has had contact with her adoptive father. Thinking he arranged all of it and that Krueger was just being bribed into teaching her, she rages violently. Krueger tells her about her own past, how she lost her great love, another woman, during the second world war, because she was a communist, and how she also taught her to play the piano.

Krueger convinces Jenny to play at the competition, where, because the police have come to take her back to prison, she has only four minutes to win the support of the crowd. She deviates from the original plan of playing a piece by Robert Schumann and plays a unique piece of her beloved "negro-music", John Cage-style lid-slapping, percussing, foot-stomping and string-plucking. When she is finished, the crowd erupts in a standing ovation.

== Critical appraisal ==
The Hollywood Reporter noted Bleibtreu's and Herzsprung's "polished performances, but their characters never change and their efforts end up feeling monotone and exhausting". It called the plot "a rehash of a tired premise" with "that romantic German idea of the doomed, misunderstood artist".

In 2008, The Guardian's film critic, Philip French, called the film "confused and disappointing", and Peter Bradshaw even felt that "underneath the harshness and the severity there is a thick, spongey layer of pure Hollywood schmaltz".

In 2009, Film Threat saw the myth of Pygmalion in the film, in how Traude, the piano teacher tried to "justify her empty life by creating one thing of beauty".

In 2012, the German Society of Pennsylvania showed the movie in their Friday Film Fest Series describing the film as defying "straightforward genrefication" if anything being part of a "genre of despairing existentialism". It criticized that it "tend[ed] toward unwitting dogmatism" and was "reductionist by nature".

As of 2012, the movie had been released in 15 territories, amongst them Great Britain, Italy, Belgium, Australia, Japan and France.

On review aggregator website Rotten Tomatoes, the film holds an approval rating of 77% based on 26 reviews, with an average rating of 6.6/10.

== Musical score ==
Annette Focks composed the score, which includes several classical pieces such as Mozart's Piano Sonata No. 12 in F major, Franz Schubert's Impromptu for piano in A flat major, Johann Sebastian Bach's Jesus bleibet meine Freude from the Cantata No. 147, "Herz und Mund und Tat und Leben". The recurring theme however, is the first movement of Mozart's Piano Sonata No. 11 in A major ("Alla Turca"), played by both Traude and Jenny. A version of "Chosn Kale Mazel Tov" was arranged by Focks.

== Awards ==
2006

- Bavarian Film Awards
  - "Best Actress" (Monica Bleibtreu)
  - "Best New Actress" (Hannah Herzsprung)
  - "Best Screenplay"
  - "Best New Director"
- "Jin Jue Award (Shanghai International Film Festival)
  - "Best Feature Film"
- "Best Feature Film" at the Reykjavik International Film Festival
- Golden Biber (28th Biberach Film Festival)
  - "Best Film"
  - "Audience Award"
- Golden Heinrich (20th International Film Festival Brunswick)
  - "Audience Award"
- "Best Set Design" (Silke Buhr) at the 40th Hofer International Film Festival
- State of Baden-Wuerttemberg
  - "Best Screenplay"

2007

- German Film Awards
  - "Best Feature Film in Gold"
  - "Best outstanding performances - female leading role" (Monica Bleibtreu)
- European Film Awards
  - European Film Academy Prix d'Excellence, EFA Feature Film Selection
