= Richy Müller =

German television and movie actor (born 1955)

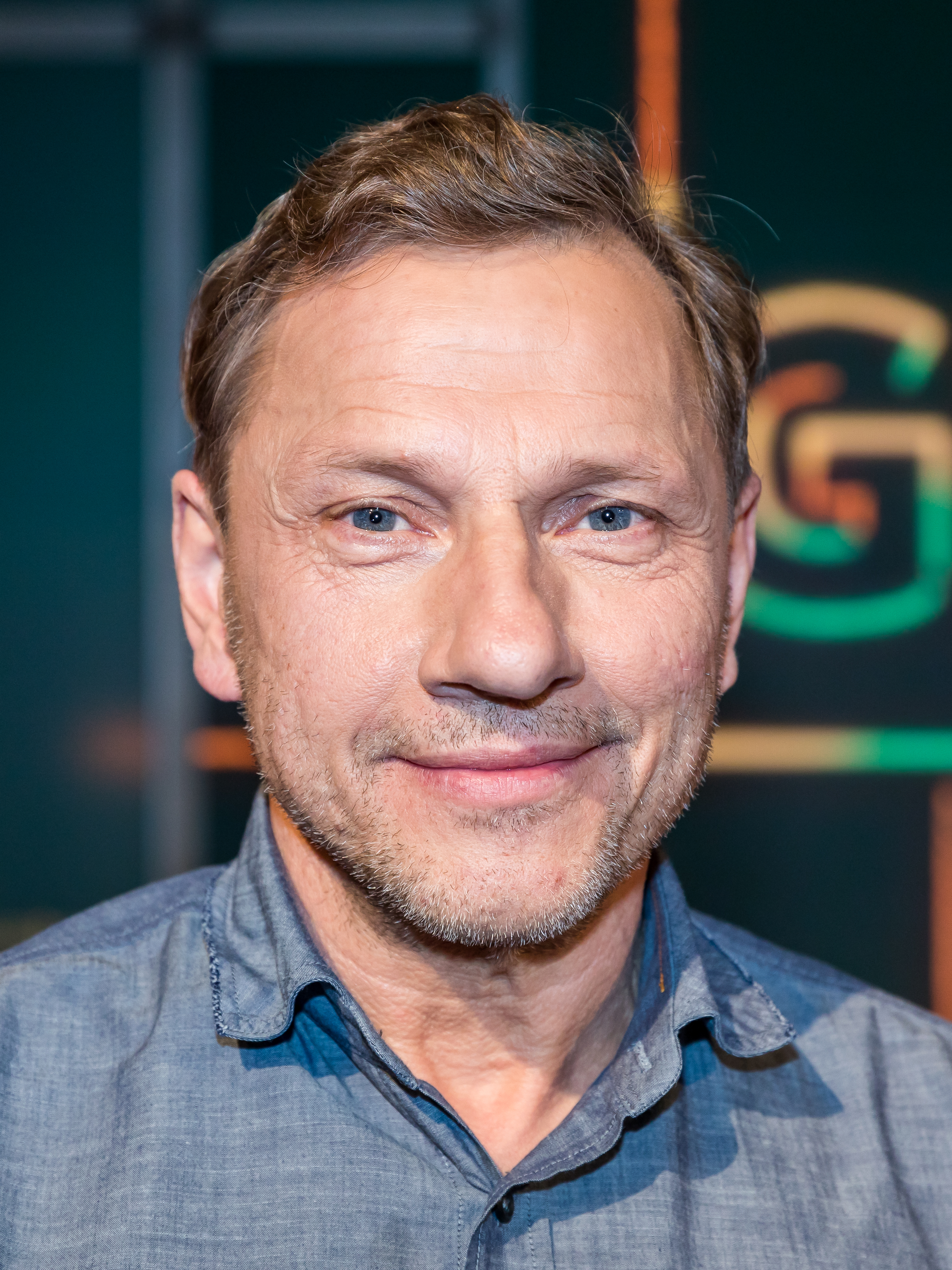
- Born: Hans-Jürgen Müller; 26 September 1955 (age 70); Mannheim, West Germany
- Years active: 1977–present

Richy Müller (born Hans-Jürgen Müller; 26 September 1955) is a German television and movie actor. He is particularly known as a crime scene investigator in the German television series Tatort.

== Filmography ==
- The Great Runaway (1979, TV miniseries)
- Jetzt und alles (1981)
- Be Gentle, Penguin (1982)
- Who's Crazy, Doc? (1982)
- Kamikaze 1989 (1982)
- The Man on the Wall (1982)
- The Noah's Ark Principle (1984)
- Pogo 1104 (1984, TV miniseries)
- The Voice (1989)
- Rosamunde (1990)
- Just a Matter of Duty (1992)
- The Little Innocent (1994, TV film)
- One of My Oldest Friends (1995)
- The Superwife (1996)
- Father's Day (1996)
- Cuba Libre (1996, TV film)
- The Pharmacist (1997)
- Die Cellistin (1998, TV film)
- Gierig (1999)
- A Big Job (1999, TV film)
- Stunde des Wolfs (2000, TV film)
- The State I Am In (2000)
- Rote Glut (2000, TV film)
- Fandango (2000)
- Die Affäre Semmeling (2002, TV miniseries)
- xXx (2002)
- Between Night and Day (2004, TV film)
- I'll Be Seeing You (2004)
- Alone (2004)
- Farland (2004)
- The Day Bobby Ewing Died (2005)
- Not All Were Murderers (2006, TV film)
- Four Minutes (2006)
- Another Word and I'll Marry You! (2007, TV film)
- Ein verlockendes Angebot (2007, TV film)
- Treasure Island (2007, TV film)
- The Poll Diaries (2010)
- Vanished (2011, TV film)
- Vampire Sisters (2012)
- Die schwarzen Brüder (2013)
- Burning Souls (2014, TV film)

== Controversy ==
During the COVID-19 pandemic in April 2021, Müller contributed to and later distanced himself from the controversial #allesdichtmachen initiative.
