= Chris Kraus (director) =

German film director and screenwriter (born 1963)

Kraus in 2017

Christopher J. Kraus (born 1963) is a German film director, screenwriter and author.

== Life and work ==
Kraus was born in 1963 in Göttingen. He worked as a screenwriter before he staged his love duel Shattered Glass (Scherbentanz) into a feature film in 2002. His second work as a director Four Minutes (Vier Minuten), a drama, won national and international awards. Kraus' third feature film, The Poll Diaries, received four golden "Lolas," three Bavarian Film Awards, one Bambi and the German Film Critic's Award. Kraus shot the film Pink Children (2012) together with four German directors about their mentor Rosa von Praunheim. This was followed by his film The Bloom of Yesterday, a winner at the Tokyo International Film Festival, at the Jewish Film Festival Moscow, of the Baden-Württemberg Film Prize and of the Thomas-Strittmatter Prize for Best Screenplay. In total, this comedy featuring Lars Eidinger and Adèle Haenel was nominated in eight categories for the German Film Prize and in three categories for the Austrian Film Prize.

== Awards ==
- 2002: Bavarian Film Award, Best New Director (Shattered Glass)
- 2002: German Film Advancement Award, Screenplay (Shattered Glass)
- 2003: New Faces Award, Best Director (Shattered Glass)
- 2006: Bavarian Film Award, Best Screenplay
- 2007: German Film Prize, Best Film (Four Minutes)
- 2007: Sofia International Film Festival, Best Director (Four Minutes)
- 2010: Black Nights Tallinn Film Festival: Best Director (The Poll Diaries)

== Filmography ==
- 1999: The Einstein of Sex
- 2000: Lovebabe
- 2002: Shattered Glass
- 2004: C(r)ook
- 2004: Acapulco
- 2006: Four Minutes
- 2008: Bella Block: Trip to China (TV film)
- 2010: The Poll Diaries
- 2012: Pink Children
- 2016: The Bloom of Yesterday

== Publications ==
- Kraus, Chris (2002). Scherbentanz : Roman (in German). Frankfurt am Main: Frankfurter Verl.-Anst. ISBN 3-627-00090-0. OCLC 236100964.
- —— (2017). Die Blumen von gestern ein Filmbuch (in German). Zürich: Diogenes Verlag. ISBN 978-3-257-30049-9. OCLC 964393572.
- —— (2017). Das kalte Blut Roman (in German). Zürich: Diogenes Verlag. ISBN 978-3-257-06973-0. OCLC 964392508.
- —— (2018). Sommerfrauen, Winterfrauen (in German). Zürich: Diogenes Verlag. ISBN 978-3-257-07040-8. OCLC 1031718240.
