= The Princess and the Warrior =

2000 film by Tom Tykwer

- Theatrical release poster
- German: Der Krieger und die Kaiserin
- Directed by: Tom Tykwer
- Written by: Tom Tykwer
- Produced by: Stefan Arndt; Katja De Bock; Gebhard Henke; Maria Köpf
- Starring: Franka Potente; Benno Fürmann
- Cinematography: Frank Griebe
- Edited by: Mathilde Bonnefoy
- Music by: Reinhold Heil; Johnny Klimek; Tom Tykwer; Lou Rhodes
- Distributed by: X Verleih
- Release dates: 2 September 2000 (Venice); 12 October 2000 (Germany)
- Running time: 135 minutes
- Country: Germany
- Language: German
- Box office: $871,058 (US)

The Princess and the Warrior (German: Der Krieger und die Kaiserin, lit. 'The Warrior and the Empress') is a 2000 German romantic drama film written and directed by Tom Tykwer. It follows the life of Sissi (Franka Potente), a psychiatric hospital nurse who, after a near-death experience, enters into a relationship with Bodo (Benno Fürmann), an anguished former soldier who lapses into criminality.

== Plot ==
Sissi, a nurse in a psychiatric hospital, receives a letter from her old friend Meike, asking for her help in retrieving a bequest from Meike's recently deceased mother. Sissi cares for her patients to the extent that they appear to be her extended family (in fact, she states that her own father is a patient in the hospital). As such, she has little experience of life outside the hospital. Meanwhile, Bodo, living with his brother, applies for a funerary job but is quickly dismissed because of his inability to control his emotions. He later robs a grocery store and during the ensuing chase indirectly causes a truck to hit Sissi. Taking cover from the police underneath the truck, Bodo finds Sissi, who cannot speak or breathe. In order to save her life, he performs an emergency tracheotomy. Once Sissi is in medical care, they are separated without Sissi ever learning his name.

The circumstances of her accident prevent Sissi from re-adjusting to her mundane life at the hospital, as she obsesses about tracking down her saviour. One of her patient friends, who had accompanied her on the day of her accident, helps her do so. She manages to track down Bodo, who is not interested in maintaining contact with her or any other woman. Bodo is seen several times, in a semi-conscious state, embracing a hot stove, having to be restrained by his brother Walter. It later becomes clear that Bodo is hallucinating (or perhaps dreaming) about his deceased wife, having never fully recovered from her death. Walter tells Sissi that Bodo's wife was killed in an explosion at a filling station, while Bodo was in the washroom. After Walter finishes his explanation, Bodo arrives and throws Sissi out.

Walter, employed as a security guard at a local bank, involves Bodo in a planned robbery (in preparation for their impending move to Australia together). As they are overpowering the money couriers in the vault, Sissi visits the bank, following Meike's instructions. As she enters, she notices that Walter is employed at the bank. The alarm is tripped by one of the couriers and Walter is shot when a security guard comes to investigate. Without thinking about it, Sissi prevents the guard from shooting the brothers and helps them escape. They deliver Walter to an emergency room, where his last words to his brother are "get off the toilet, Bodo" (referring to Bodo's inability to move on after his wife's death, seeing himself stuck in the gas station's restroom). Sissi hides Bodo at the institution, where he suffers a violent breakdown upon learning of his brother's death on TV. This incident brings Bodo to the attention of the head doctor at the institution, and he is treated and kept as a patient. It is during this period that Bodo explains to Sissi the true nature of his wife's death; a flashback shows Bodo and his wife engaged in a serious argument at the filling station. After heading to the washroom, Bodo witnesses his wife engulfed in a huge explosion caused by her deliberate dropping of a cigarette into a pool of gasoline.

Sissi makes the decision to leave and asks Bodo to come with her, telling him of her dream in which they were "brother and sister, father and mother, husband and wife". Meanwhile, Steini, one of the patients, who recognized Bodo's identity and is jealous of him spending time with Sissi, calls the police and in a delusion tries to kill Bodo by electrocution (by throwing a toaster into Bodo's bathtub). The delusion, really a flashback, reveals that Steini had killed Sissi's mother the same way. Bodo however catches the toaster out of the air before it can fall into the tub and chases Steini into the attic. Meanwhile, the police arrive, and Sissi realizes that her mother was in fact murdered and did not commit suicide. She follows Steini to the roof, who offers to jump to atone for his actions. She declines, saying "You're not going to jump anyway", grabs Bodo's hand, and together they jump from the roof of the building, into a small pond.

The final scene (taking place at the scene of Bodo's wife's accident) strays into a bit of surrealism: Bodo's past personality, unkempt and finally emerging from the gas station restroom, takes a seat behind the wheel, while the real Bodo gets in the back of the car. As they drive off, Sissi touches (old) Bodo's face to wipe away his tears, but he stops her and does so himself, pushing her away yet again. This visibly stirs (real) Bodo, who leans forward and covers his former self's eyes, forcing him to brake. "Real" Bodo tells "old" Bodo to get out and leaves him standing in the middle of the road thus symbolically taking over "old" Bodo's life; perhaps a visual metaphor for beginning anew.

In the international version of the movie, a small scene commences with the abandoned "old" Bodo as a more resolved ending to this surrealistic character and moment. Turning, he notices a sign indicating a bus stop in the field off the road; he waits by it, and an empty bus, driven by Walter, soon arrives to pick up this "dead" version of Bodo. The brothers do not speak, and they drive off a short distance before disappearing.

The film ends with Bodo's redemption through his acceptance of Sissi, as he is shown at last content and dry-eyed as the couple arrive at Meike's seaside house on the edge of a cliff.

== Cast ==
- Franka Potente as Simone, "Sissi"
- Benno Fürmann as Bodo
- Joachim Król as Walter
- Lars Rudolph as Steini
- Melchior Beslon as Otto
- Ludger Pistor as Werner
- Natja Brunckhorst as Meike

== Reception ==
On the review aggregator website Rotten Tomatoes, 63% of 82 critics' reviews are positive, with an average rating of 6.1/10. The website's consensus reads: "More slow-moving than Run Lola Run, this film nonetheless offers an intriguing storyline about love and fate." Metacritic, which uses a weighted average, assigned the film a score of 64 out of 100, based on 25 critics, indicating "generally favorable" reviews.
