= Alien Invasion: S.U.M.1 =

2017 film

- Directed by: Christian Pasquariello
- Written by: Christian Pasquariello
- Starring: Iwan Rheon; André M. Hennicke; Rainer Werner; Zoe Grisedale; Niels Bruno Schmidt
- Cinematography: Hagen Bogdanski
- Edited by: Dirk Grau
- Distributed by: UFA
- Release dates: 11 March 2017 (Japan); 7 December 2017 (Germany)
- Running time: 93 minutes
- Country: Germany
- Language: English

Alien Invasion: S.U.M.1 (also marketed as simply S.U.M.1 or SUM1) is a 2017 science fiction film written and directed by Christian Pasquariello and starring Iwan Rheon and André Hennicke.

== Premise ==
Private S.U.M.1, a soldier living in a post-apocalyptic Earth, is serving on a hundred-day mission outside Exilium, the highly fortified compound housing the human survivors of an alien invasion. S.U.M.1 is assigned to an outpost to monitor and secure a remote bunker which is part of a defense circle surrounding the compound.

== Plot ==
S.U.M.1 completes training and mounts into a tank for his 100 day deployment to outpost Cerberus. On his way, you see refugees outside running toward Exilium. Upon arrival, the tank goes on as he gets situated. His initial entry into the housing bunker is unsuccessful, as the door is jammed, so he climbs the sentry tower to communicate with the higher ups, where he hears that the former soldier occupying his post, VAX7, was evacuated for medical reasons and that everything is fine. They instruct him how to get into the back entrance to the bunker, gives him the daily access code, and he goes off to settle in. He opens the outer door, enters a long hallway, and eventually arrives in the residence, which is unkempt and mostly empty. There are 6 bunks and a central table, and he puts away his food rations and cleans the space, finishing up by polishing a glass cup.

He then enters a monotonous cycle where he dreams of children bouncing against a warm blue background, is abruptly woken up by the daily alarm, telling him how many days left of his active service, exercise, showers, daily check-ins, and a single rationed cigarette. There are constant audio messages outside asking surviving humans to go to Exilium for their protection from the Nonsuch, and that the soldiers' duties are to assist in this as much as possible. Outpost Cerberus consists of a tower surrounded by a defensive circle made up of individual security rings, each centered around a monitoring camera. As part of his duties, SUM1 goes outside to conduct maintenance on the security system, and as time progresses, he gets more and more curious as to why he's never seen the Nonsuch and what is actually going on. The camera also focuses on many security domes housing cameras, revealing the heavy surveillance of the soldiers while the soldiers surveil their defense circle (DC). Soon after settling in, there's a general broadcast that reports Outpost Lalops was suddenly attacked by Nonsuch and SUM1 sees and hears explosions and alien screams from his tower balcony.

He starts to get bored and lonely, especially since there are no other people around and his communications with his superiors is always abrupt and they're always telling him not to worry. Eventually, he makes friends with the resident rat, calling him Doc, and sharing his food (and his own blood, sometimes) with him. The loneliness starts descending into hallucinations and questioning of his mission, and though he reports what he sees and experiences, including finding a dog tag on a tree along with a dead bird, all his concerns are quickly dismissed by his commander, causing him to doubt even more. As he explores the bunker more thoroughly, he finds a blood spot on the wall and starts suspecting now that VAX7 shot himself and wasn't evacuated at all. He then decides to break into VAX7's still-locked locker, and tries to find what he can about what really is going on. After breaking the lock, he finds a sketchbook and a radio. Among the drawings is a sketch of Cerberus and the neighboring defense circle Gram, and piques his interest. He goes out to try to make contact with Gram, but the perimeter of his DC activates a pain-inducing implant that keeps him from going on, along with audible commands to remain at his post. He decides to back away a little and climb a tree, hoping to make contact by waving and yelling at Gram, but with no response.

Back in the bunker, he gets so frustrated that he breaks the glass while polishing it, and cuts himself. While he and doc clean up, he hears music from the radio in the locker, followed by the voice of a neighboring soldier KER4 calling for VAX7. While he tries passing as VAX7, the sending soldier knows it's not him and asks what happened to VAX7, concluding communications by saying communication is unauthorized. As SUM1 continues his deployment, his mental state deteriorates as he continues to investigate and strange "coincidences" occur, like while digging through outpost video history, a sudden power outage strikes and upon restoration, files he was looking at are gone. He continues to doubt everything, particularly when the power outage at his outpost are minimized and he's told a MAC will be there eventually to fix things, but with no estimated date given the risk of Nonsuch.

The MAC finally arrives during a storm, and while he is grateful for someone to talk to, SUM1 is also highly suspicious of the newcomer, so he treats him coldly and they get to fisticuffs when the MAC swipes Doc into the wall. He eventually pulls a gun to the MAC to shut off the internal camera and to help unlock the historical videos. When the MAC gets stuck, as access requires 2 soldiers' daily codes, they fight again. After losing the fight, the MAC tells SUM1 of his war stories long ago when he was a soldier fighting the Nonsuch, and SUM1 locks the MAC in the bunker as he gets a set of codes from KER4 over the radio. After digging around in the videos, he finds out that VAX7 did go crazy after all, and SUM1 reports this back to KER4 where his conspiracy theories overflow, saying there's no Nonsuch to defend against and their mission to get humans into Exilium is a ploy to restrict their consumption of dwindling natural resources while rich and powerful people enjoy the remnants unrestricted. After his rant, he asks KER4 for a meet, which the latter reluctantly accepts.

Calming only slightly as he goes back to the bunker residence, he is set off again by the announcement that the Nonsuch have advanced and in his fury, kills Doc who was inside a canister he threw. In mourning, he goes outside naked with a still-deteriorating mentality when he sees a monstrous figure whom he suspects is a Nonsuch. Pulling a set of antlers out of a tree, he fatally stabs the monster, only to find it is VAX7 from a neck tattoo, further cementing his conspiracy theory. He goes back to release the MAC, and tells him all about the conspiracy, including that he thinks the MAC is in on it and that the MAC's stories drove VAX7 mad. With one final threat to the MAC's life, he asks how to deactivate the DC so he can leave his post and talk to KER4. After getting the information, he sets the MAC free though the MAC's 4x4 computer is also destroyed.

SUM1 approaches the DC perimeter, and while in pain, digs up the cable and cuts it, setting off alarms while he continues on to Gram. Upon entering and climbing up, he finds the tower in disarray from an attack and KER4 nowhere to be found. When he sees drips of blood, not his own, he finally realizes that the Nonsuch threat is real, and while looking out the broken windows, sees vehicles attacking all around in the twilight. With his DC down and Gram already taken offline, the Nonsuch are able to advance and attack, and while the MAC returns to try to save SUM1, his vehicle is taken by a Nonsuch and is himself eaten or otherwise beheaded. SUM1 flees and tries to enter his bunker but finds that the daily code isn't working as he smashed his wrist computer. On the 3rd try, he is able to get in, and the automated system tells him to stay calm while evacuation is dispatched. However, he quickly finds that the bunker is not able to withstand Nonsuch attack, and the film ends as a single Nonsuch breaches the bunker and looks for SUM1, who fires to unknown effect toward the alien's mouthparts.

== Cast ==
- Iwan Rheon as S.U.M.1
- André Hennicke as MAC
- Rainer Werner as V.A.X.7
- Norman Reedus as K.E.R.4 (voice)
