= Operational image =

Image with a functional purpose

An operational image, also known as operative image, is an image that serves a functional, rather than aesthetic, purpose. Operational images are not intended to be viewed by people as representations of the real world; they are created to be used as instruments in performing some task or operation, often by machine automation. Operational images are used in a wide variety of applications, such as weapons targeting and guidance systems, and assisting surgeons performing robot-assisted surgery.

The term "operational image" was first coined in 2000 by German filmmaker Harun Farocki in the first part of his three-part audiovisual installation, Eye/Machine. Farocki's installation included operational images used by militaries, such as weapons guidance and targeting systems. Eye/Machine featured images shown to the public by the United States military from the cameras used by laser-guided missiles in the Gulf War. Farocki defined operational images as "Images without a social goal, not for edification, not for reflection," and that they "do not represent an object, but rather are part of an operation."

According to Volker Pantenburg, operational images are more accurately characterized as "visualizations of data". He describes operational images as a "working image" or an image that "performs work".

Operational images are ubiquitous in modern society, used for a variety of military and non-military applications, such as inspecting sewer pipes, and assisting surgeons performing robotic surgery.
