= Naked (2002 film) =

2002 film by Doris Dörrie

- Directed by: Doris Dörrie
- Screenplay by: Doris Dörrie
- Based on: Happy; 2001 play by Doris Dörrie
- Produced by: Bernd Eichinger; Norbert Preuss
- Starring: Heike Makatsch; Benno Fürmann; Alexandra Maria Lara
- Cinematography: Frank Griebe
- Edited by: Frank Müller; Inez Regnier
- Music by: Liquid Loop; Florian Riedl
- Release date: 19 September 2002
- Running time: 100 minutes
- Country: Germany
- Language: German

Naked (Nackt in German) is a German comedy film about the relationship problems of three young couples in Berlin, who meet for a dinner party which does not go well. Released in 2002, it was directed by Doris Dörrie who also wrote the screenplay.

== Plot ==
Three couples aged around 30, who were close friends when younger, meet for a dinner party. But nothing is as uncomplicated as it used to be and tension is felt from the first moment.

Emilia and Felix have recently separated and she has let herself go. She has cut off her hair, wears grungy clothes and her flat is a mess. Though the two never minded not having much money, she admits to an affair with the now-rich Dylan, their host for the evening. Their friends Annette and Boris do not have much money either and their relationship is always edgy, so much so that Boris can never find the right moment to hand over the engagement ring he has bought. Dylan and his wife are millionaires, from the business Dylan has built. With an ostentatious new house full of designer kitsch and no need to work, Charlotte is deeply unhappy and feels that their wealth has trapped them both.

In the company of their four old friends, the atmosphere is not relaxed and sharp remarks are exchanged. After the meal, Felix suggests replicating an experiment conducted at the university where Emilia works. The other two couples must place bets that once stripped and blindfolded they will be able to pick out their partner by touch alone. Any sound is forbidden and all are sprayed with the same perfume to mask differences in smell. Emilia and Felix, not being a couple, will be referees.

When the blindfolds are removed, Annette has been selected by Dylan and his wife Charlotte by Boris. Recriminations follow, ending in insults and blows. Left alone, Dylan tries to placate the hurt and furious Charlotte, ultimately suggesting that the answer to their problems would be a baby. Walking home together, Annette (who fancies Dylan) takes such a philosophical attitude to the mix-up that Boris at last feels able to propose to her with the ring he always carries. Felix sees Emilia to her flat and she tries to go to bed, but he wants to talk about past happy times. In the end, she agrees to strip and play the blindfold game with him.

== Cast ==
- Heike Makatsch: Emilia
- Benno Fürmann: Felix
- Alexandra Maria Lara: Annette
- Jürgen Vogel: Boris
- Nina Hoss: Charlotte
- Mehmet Kurtuluş: Dylan
