= Jerichow (film) =

- theatrical film poster
- Directed by: Christian Petzold
- Written by: Christian Petzold
- Produced by: Florian Koerner von Gustorf; Jochen Kölsch; Bettina Reitz; Andreas Schreitmüller; Michael Weber
- Starring: Benno Fürmann; Nina Hoss; Hilmi Sözer
- Cinematography: Hans Fromm
- Edited by: Bettina Böhler
- Music by: Stefan Will
- Release dates: 7 September 2008 (Toronto International Film Festival); 8 January 2009 (Germany)
- Running time: 90 minutes
- Country: Germany
- Languages: German, Turkish

Jerichow is a 2008 German drama film written and directed by Christian Petzold. It is loosely inspired by the 1934 American novel The Postman Always Rings Twice by James M. Cain.

The film was invited into the competition of the 65th Venice Film Festival, as the first film to be shown, and was also nominated for the 2009 German Film Prize in the Best Feature Film and Best Director categories. The official German premiere was on 8 January 2009. The American showings were in German with English subtitles. As the title suggests, the film takes place in the German town of Jerichow.

== Plot summary ==
Thomas, a soldier dishonorably discharged from the army after service in Afghanistan, returns home to Jerichow, where he is in debt and can only find menial employment. As he walks home from a day of degrading cucumber picking, he witnesses a drunk driver veer off of the road. He assists the driver, a Turkish German businessman named Ali, and when the police arrive, vouches for him, stating that he, not Ali was driving the car. Ali asks him to drive him back home, where Thomas catches a glimpse of Ali's young, beautiful wife Laura.

Shortly after, Ali approaches Thomas and asks him to become his driver, as his license has been suspended for drunk driving. Thomas accepts, and begins to accompany him on his rounds visiting the fast food joints he owns. After Thomas disarms a vengeful renter attempting to harm Ali, he gratefully invites Thomas to a day at the beach with Laura. There, Ali gets drunk and encourages Thomas and Laura to dance with each other "like Germans do", igniting a torrid affair. Ali does catch his wife cheating—not with Thomas, but with one of Ali's suppliers—but forgives her (only after beating her).

Ali tells Thomas that he is going on a trip to Turkey, and entrusts his business to Thomas and Laura in his absence. After he leaves, Thomas asks Laura to run away with him, citing Ali's abusive and jealous behavior. Laura refuses, explaining that she is financially dependent on Ali, who took on her sizable debts upon marriage but would be released from them in the case of divorce. In order to circumvent the prenup, the pair hatch a plan to kill Ali and stage his death as a suicide by getting him drunk, knocking him unconscious, and driving his car off of a seaside cliff.

Laura picks Ali up from the airport and drives him to the beach, where Thomas is lying in wait. There, Ali admits to her that he was not in Turkey, but seeking treatment for a heart condition in Leipzig; it is incurable and he has two months to live. He tells Laura that he will pay off her debts and make her his sole heir. Stunned, Laura tries to call off the plot, inadvertently alerting Ali to it in the process. He finds Thomas and disdainfully tells Laura to leave with him. As they walk away, he gets into the car and drives it off of the cliff.

== Cast ==
- Benno Fürmann as Thomas
- Nina Hoss as Laura
- Hilmi Sözer as Ali Özkan
- André Hennicke as Leon
- Claudia Geisler as Clerical assistant
- Marie Gruber as Cashier
- Knut Berger as Policeman

== Reception ==
Wesley Morris, a writer for The Boston Globe, liked the film despite what he called silly romance and even sillier suspense. In a review for Philadelphia Weekly, Matt Prigge gave the film a mixed review with a B rating. Roderick Conway Morris, of International Herald Tribune, complimented the performances of the three actors. Roger Ebert gave the film a positive review, saying "Petzold, who also wrote the script, doesn't make level one thrillers, and his characters may be smarter than us, or dumber".

On review aggregator website Rotten Tomatoes, the film holds an approval rating of 90% based on 39 reviews, with an average rating of 7.2/10.
