= André Hennicke =

German actor

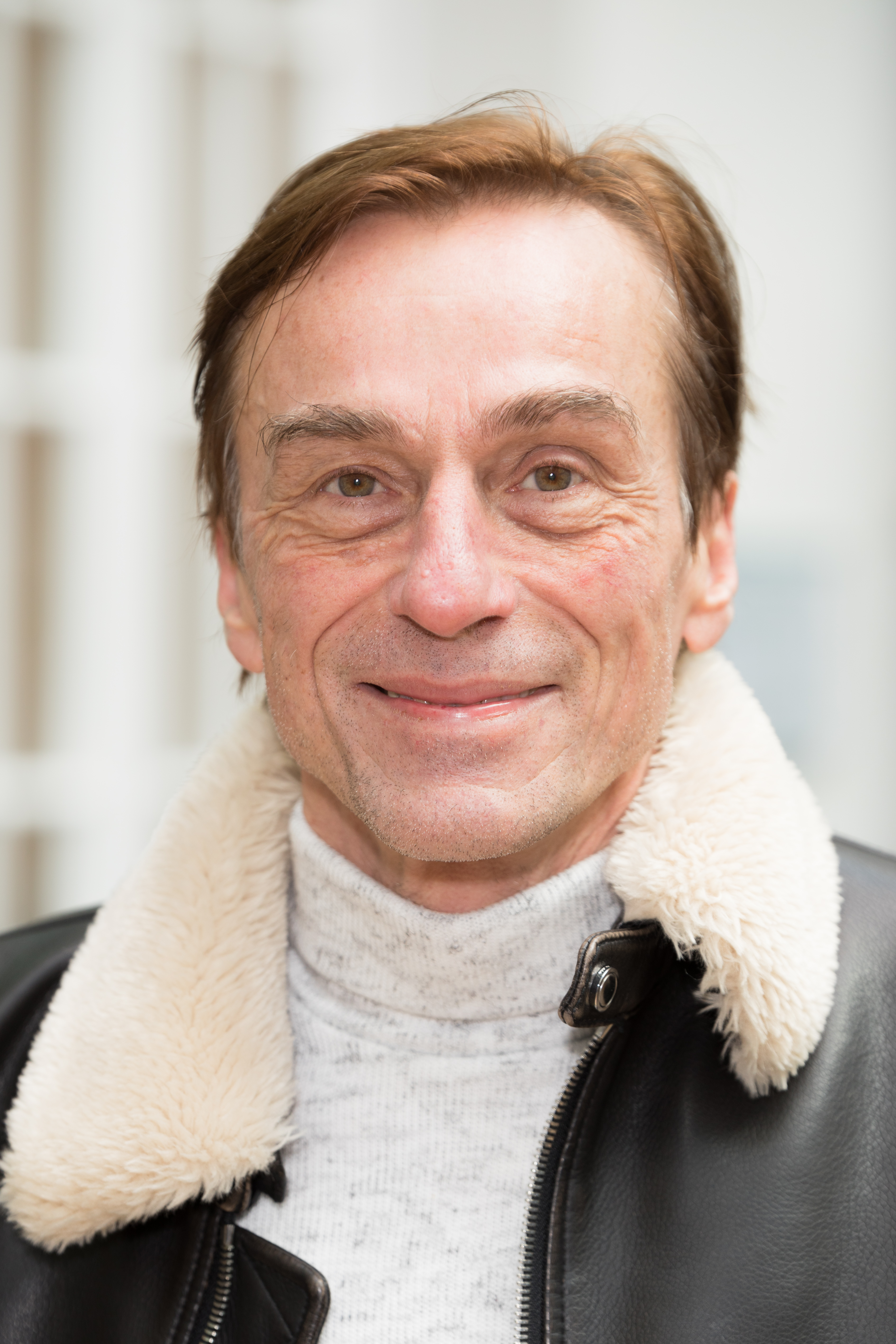
- Born: 21 September 1958 (age 67); Johanngeorgenstadt, Bezirk Karl-Marx-Stadt, East Germany
- Occupation: Actor
- Years active: 1984-present

André Hennicke (born 21 September 1958) is a German actor. He has appeared in more than one hundred films since 1984.

Hennicke was born in Johanngeorgenstadt in Saxony. He was awarded a German television award for best actor for Something to Remind Me in 2002. He has appeared in the 2004 film Downfall as SS General Wilhelm Mohnke, 2005's Sophie Scholl – The Final Days as infamous Nazi judge Roland Freisler, and the 2005 docudrama Speer und Er as Nazi leader Rudolf Hess. In 2009, he appeared as one of the primary antagonists in science-fiction thriller Pandorum, portraying the leader of a group of genetically mutated human-hybrids. In 2015 in Buddha's Little Finger plays role of Vasily Chapayev.

== Selected filmography ==
Film
Year	Title	Role	Notes
2001	Something to Remind Me	Thomas Richter	TV film
2003	Angst	Robert	
2004	Downfall	General Wilhelm Mohnke	
2005	Sophie Scholl – The Final Days	Roland Freisler	
2005	Antibodies	Gabriel Engel	
2006	The Free Will	Sascha	
2006	Eduart	Christoph	
2007	Youth Without Youth	Josef Rudolf	
2008	Buddenbrooks	Gosch	
2008	Jerichow	Leon	
2009	The Countess	Andreas Berthoni	
2009	Sometime in August	Friedrich	
2010	Die Auflehnung	Willy Wittmann	TV film
2010	The Albanian	Pharmacist	
2011	A Dangerous Method	Eugen Bleuler	
2011	Shadows from the Past	Kurt Matzinger	TV film
2011	205 – Room of Fear	Commissioner Urban	
2012	Reported Missing	Lothar	
2014	The Wonders	Adrian	
2014	ABCs of Death 2	Klaus	Segment: "R is for Roulette"
2015	Victoria	Andi	
2015	Buddha's Little Finger	Vasily Chapayev	
2016	Jonathan	Burkhard	
2017	The Last Note	Karl Fischer	
2017	Iceman	Gris	
2017	Alien Invasion: S.U.M.1	MAC	
2021	The Girl and the Spider	Jurek	

TV Series
Year	Title	Role	Notes
2005	The Fall of the Empire	Rigert	TV miniseries
2005	Speer und Er	Rudolf Hess	TV miniseries
2007–2008	GSG 9 – Ihr Einsatz ist ihr Leben	Thomas Anhoff	25 episodes
2012	World Without End	Joby	TV miniseries
