= Katrin Gebbe =

German film director and screenwriter (born 1983)

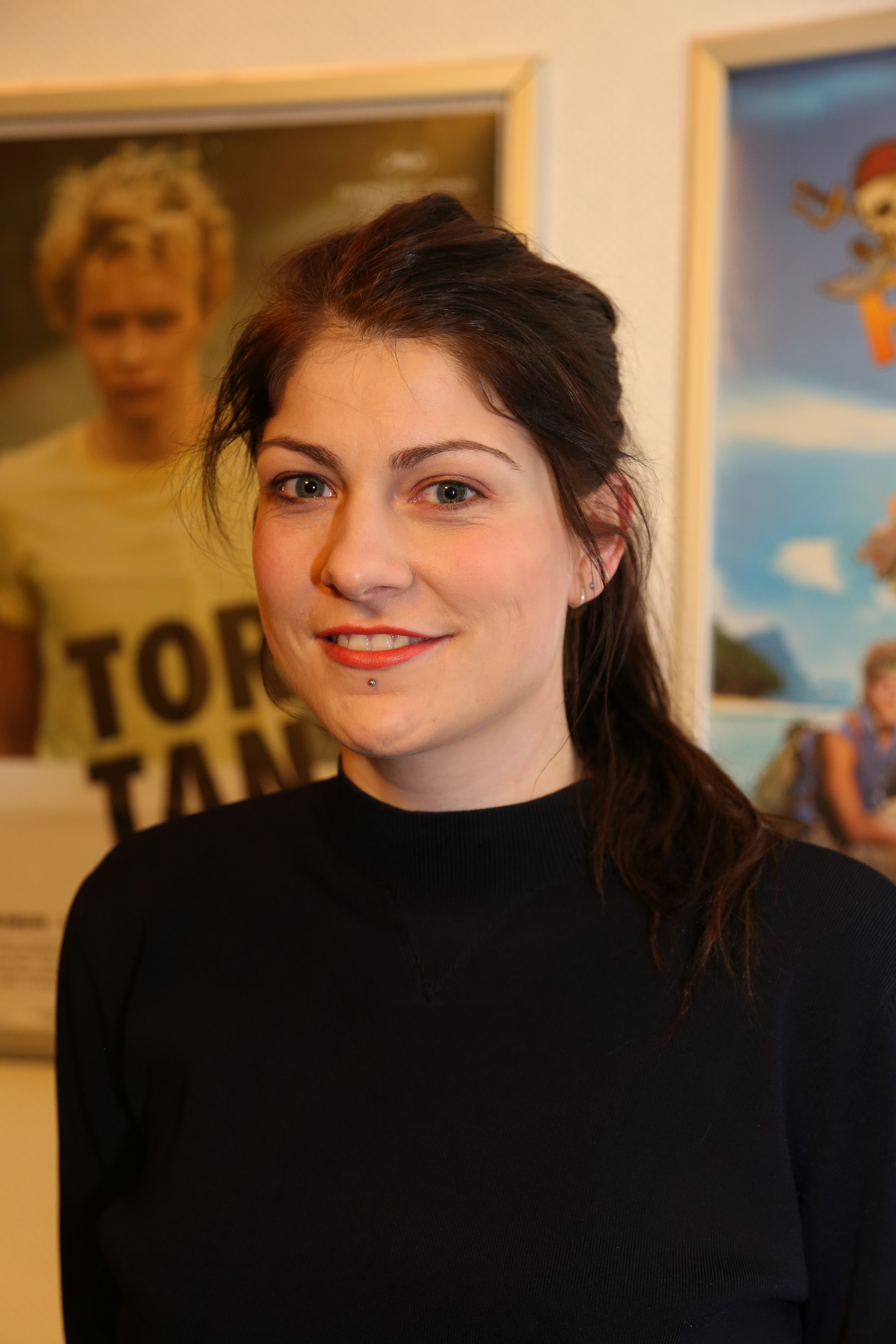
- Katrin Gebbe showing her first movie Tore tanzt, at the Apollo-Cinema Center, 2014 in Ibbenbühren (GER).
- Born: 1983 (age 41–42); Ibbenbüren, Germany
- Occupation(s): Film director, screenwriter
- Years active: 2005–present
- Awards: Bavarian Film Awards; Adult Jury Prize CICFF (Short Film); European Young Civis media prize; Preis der deutschen Filmkritik; German Film Award for Best Direction; Montblanc Script Award

Katrin Gebbe (born 1983) is a German film director and screenwriter.

== Biography ==
Katrin Gebbe studied liberal arts and visual communication at the Academy of Visual Arts in Enschede, where she made her first short experimental film. In 2005, she completed her postgraduate specialty work of film direction at the Hamburg Media School. Her degree work, the short film Şoreş & Şîrîn, featuring Ulrike Folkerts, was awarded at the Chicago International Children's Film Festival with the ″Adult Jury Prize″ for short films. In addition, Şoreş & Şîrîn also received the European Young Civis media prize in 2009

Her feature film début Nothing Bad Can Happen (German: Tore tanzt) tells the story of a Hamburg Jesus Freak. The film received an invitation from the Un Certain Regard section at the 66th Cannes Film Festival. There, the movie also had its premiere, on 23 May 2013. Gebbe and Verena Höfe-Gräft, the producer, originally met during their time in college and started working together on the project in 2009. The main role was played by the actor, newcomer Julius Feldmeier. For this movie, Katrin Gebbe received the 2013 Preis der deutschen Filmkritik for the best feature film début, as the Bavarian Film Awards for the best newcomer director.

== Filmography ==
- KOI (short film - 2006)
- Narzissen (short film - 2007)
- Einladung (short film - 2007)
- Şoreş & Şîrîn (short film - 2008)
- Nothing Bad Can Happen (2013)
- Tatort: Fünf Minuten Himmel (2016, TV series episode)
- The Field Guide to Evil (2018, anthology film, segment: A Nocturnal Breath)
- Pelican Blood (2019)
- The Empress (2022, co-directing in upcoming Netflix series; lead director in pilot and two episodes)
