= Nina Hoss =

German actress

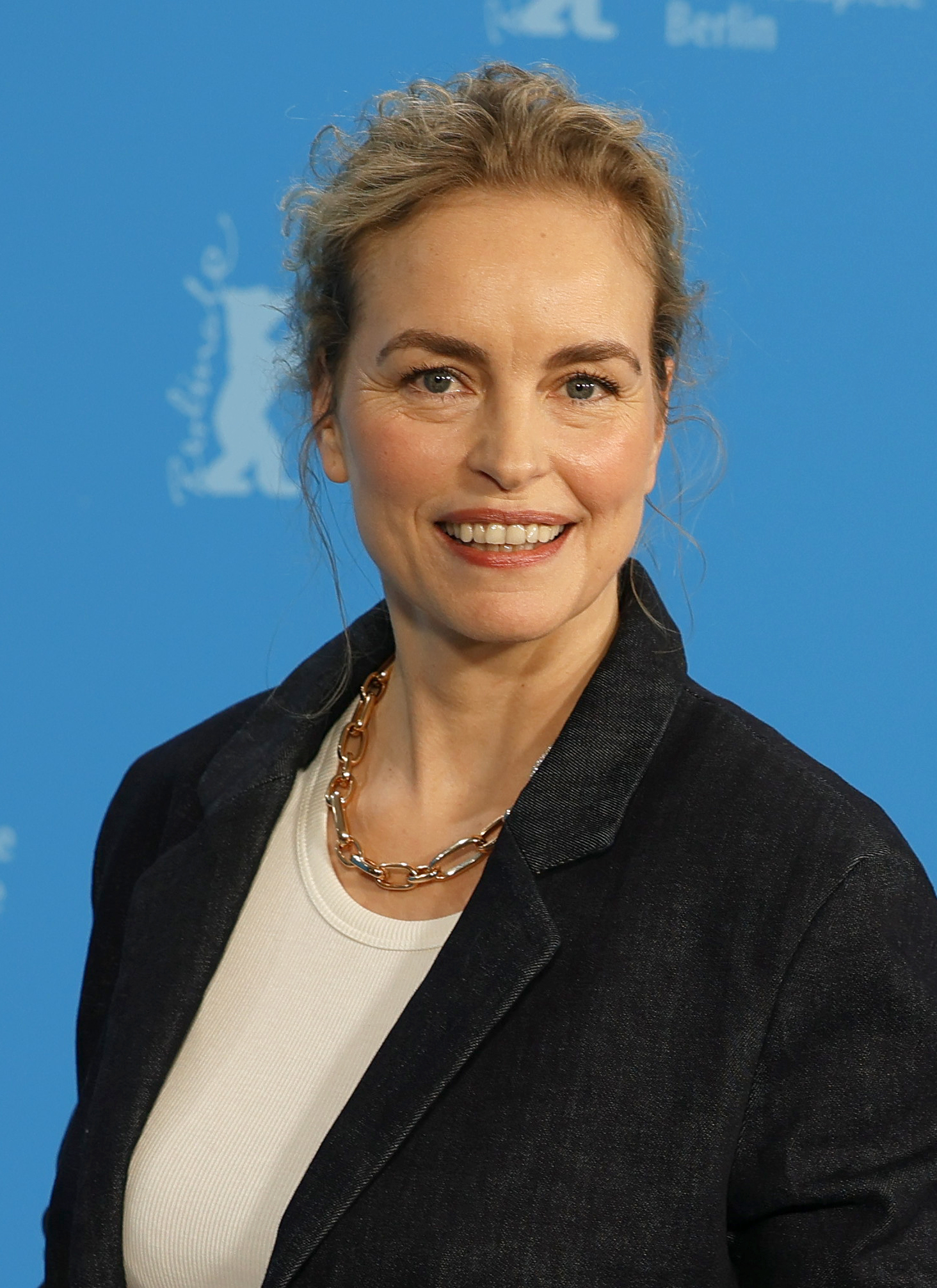
- Hoss at the Berlinale 2024
- Born: 7 July 1975 (age 51); Stuttgart, West Germany
- Occupation: Actress
- Years active: 1996–present
- Known for: The White Masai; A Woman in Berlin; Barbara; Phoenix; A Most Wanted Man; Homeland; Tár; Hedda
- Spouse: Alex Silva (m. 2015)

Nina Hoss (German: [ˈniːna hɔs]; born 7 July 1975) is a German stage, film, and television actress. She is known for her collaborations with director Christian Petzold in films such as Barbara (2012) and Phoenix (2014). Her roles in other films include The White Masai (2005), Pelican Blood (2020), Tár (2022), and Hedda (2025). She has also starred in the American TV series Homeland (2014–2017), The Defeated (2020), and Jack Ryan (2022).

Hoss received the Order of Merit of the Federal Republic of Germany in 2013 and was appointed a Ordre des Arts et des Lettres of France in 2015.

== Early life and education ==
Hoss was born in Stuttgart, West Germany, in 1975. Her father, Willi Hoss, was a German trade unionist and politician (member of the Bundestag with The Greens, which he co-founded). Her mother, Heidemarie Rohweder, was an actress at Stuttgart National Theatre and later director of the Esslingen-based Württemberg State Playhouse (Württembergische Landesbühne Esslingen).

Hoss acted in radio plays at the age of seven, and appeared on stage for the first time at the age of 14.

In 1997, Hoss graduated from the Ernst Busch Academy of Dramatic Arts in Berlin, where she studied alongside Lars Eidinger, Fritzi Haberlandt, Devid Striesow, and Mark Waschke.

== Career ==
Hoss' first major success was the title role Rosemarie Nitribitt of Bernd Eichinger's A Girl Called Rosemary in 1996, a period drama (based on an actual scandal) set in the 1950s that looks back at the days of West Germany's postwar Wirtschaftswunder, with what a New York Times review calls a "curdling cynicism".

In 2000, Hoss was one of the Shooting Stars at the Berlinale. Her close collaboration with director Christian Petzold has been extremely successful; she won the 2003 Adolf Grimme Award for her role in his film Something to Remind Me and two years later the Adolf Grimme Award in Gold for Wolfsburg. Her performance of Yella, earned her the Silver Bear for Best Actress at the Berlin International Film Festival in 2007 and the German Film Award in 2008. Another collaboration with Petzold, Barbara, in which Hoss plays a doctor exiled to an East German provincial backwater in 1980, premiered at the Berlin International Film Festival in 2011 and the Toronto International Film Festival in 2012.

She later made her name in Hollywood playing a German BND agent in three seasons of the series Homeland (2014–2017). Hoss starred in the 2020 miniseries The Defeated, and was a series regular in season three of Tom Clancy's Jack Ryan in 2022.

As a stage actress, Hoss was an ensemble member at the Deutsches Theater in Berlin from 1998 to 2013, where she appeared as Medea and as Franziska in Minna von Barnhelm (2005). In 2013, she joined the ensemble of the Schaubühne theatre in Berlin. There, she starred in three productions by director Thomas Ostermeier, including Lillian Hellman's 'Little Foxes' (2014) and the world premiere of Yasmina Reza's Bella Figura (2015). In his stage production (2017) of Didier Eribon's book Returning to Reims, her starring role drew autobiographically from her relationship with her father and his activist politics.

Hoss recorded a duet with the Welsh rock band Manic Street Preachers called "Europa geht durch mich" ("Europe goes through me") for the album Futurology, which was released on 7 July 2014. Hoss features on the 2021 album Bright Magic by Public Service Broadcasting.

She stars in Todd Field's Tár alongside Cate Blanchett as Sharon Goodnow, a violin player who is the partner of conductor Lydia Tár. In the film, Hoss plays the concertmaster of an orchestra. In 2025, Hoss starred as Eileen Lovborg in Nia DaCosta's Hedda, for which she received critical praise for her performance.

== Other activities ==
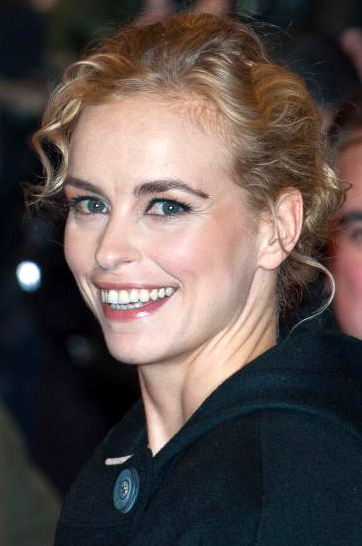
Hoss in 2012

Hoss was a jury member of the German Film Academy's First Steps awards for young filmmakers in 2000. She was a member of the juries of the Locarno International Film Festival in 2009, the Berlin International Film Festival in 2011, and the 73rd Venice International Film Festival in 2016.

She served as the sole judge of the 2012 Alfred Kerr Acting Prize at the Berliner Theatertreffen.

In 2018, she was part of the jury that awarded the first-ever Wortmeldungen Prize for Literature of the Crespo Foundation.

=== Social and political commitment ===
Hoss supports the Make Poverty History campaign and fights female genital mutilation. In continuation of the work of her father she is committed as a goodwill ambassador of the state of Pará in Brazil against the destruction of the rain forest and to improve the living conditions of the indigenous people living there.

In 2017, she joined Cate Blanchett, Lars von Trier, and others, in signing a petition in support of Russian director Kirill Serebrennikov and against a crackdown on artistic expression in Russia.

Hoss served as an Alliance 90/The Greens delegate to the Federal Convention for the purpose of electing the President of Germany in 2004 and 2010.

== Recognition and honors ==
Hoss has received numerous state honours, including the Order of Merit of the Federal Republic of Germany (2013). She was appointed a Chevalier de l'Ordre des Arts et des Lettres in France (2015).

In August 2019 Hoss was invited to be a member of the Academy of Motion Picture Arts and Sciences.

She has received glowing reviews by American critics for her performances in films.

== Personal life ==
Hoss married British music producer Alex Silva in 2015 after having been in a relationship with him for 12 years.

== Filmography ==
Film and television roles
Year	Title	Role	Notes
1996	And Nobody Weeps for Me	Marilli Kosemund	
1996	A Girl Called Rosemary	Rosemarie Nitribitt	Television film
1998	Rider of the Flames	Marie Rätzer	
1998	Love Your Neighbour!	Liz	
1999	The Volcano	Marion von Kammer	Dir. Ottokar Runze
2000	Die Geiseln von Costa Rica	Kiki	Television film
2001	Toter Mann	Leyla	Television film
2002	Naked	Charlotte	
2002	Epstein's Night	Paula	
2002	Emilia Galotti	Countess Orsina	Television film
2003	Wolfsburg	Laura Reiser	
2003	Leonce und Lena	Prinzessin Lena	Television film
2005	The White Masai	Carola Mamutelil geb. Lehmann	
2006	Atomised	Jane	
2006	Hannah	Hannah Morgan	
2007	Yella	Yella Fichte	
2007	The Heart Is a Dark Forest	Marie	
2008	The Anarchist's Wife	Lenin	
2008	Jerichow	Laura	
2008	A Woman in Berlin	Anonyma	
2010	We Are the Night	Louise	
2011	Summer Window	Juliane Kreisler	
2012	Barbara	Barbara	
2013	Gold	Emily Meyer	
2014	A Most Wanted Man	Irna Frey	
2014	Phoenix	Nelly Lenz	
2014–2017	Homeland	Astrid	Recurring role (seasons 4–6), 13 episodes
2017	Return to Montauk	Rebecca	
2019	The Audition	Anna Bronsky	
2019	Pelican Blood	Wiebke	
2019	Criminal (Germany)	Claudia	
2020	My Little Sister	Lisa	
2020	The Defeated	Elsie Garten	Miniseries
2022	The Contractor	Katia	
2022	Tár	Sharon Goodnow	
2022	Jack Ryan	President Alena Kovac	Main role (season 3)
2023	Do Not Expect Too Much from the End of the World	Doris Goethe	
2024	Langue étrangère	Suzanne Schreber	It was screened in Competition at the Berlinale on 19 February 2024.
2025	Cicadas	Anja	It was screened in Panorama at the 75th Berlin International Film Festival in February 2025.
2025	Hannah Arendt: Facing Tyranny	Hannah Arendt	
2025	Hedda	Eileen Lovborg	
TBA	The Julia Set †		Post-production

== Film awards and nominations ==
Hoss has won or been nominated for many awards, including:

- 2019 – Douglas Sirk Award at the Filmfest Hamburg
- 2023 – Santa Barbara International Film Festival - Virtuosos Award, for Tár; recognising "noteworthy performances in films which have elevated them into the national cinematic dialogue"

Year	Nominated work	Award	Category	Results	Ref
1997	A Girl Called Rosemarie	Goldene Kamera awards	Lilli Palmer Memorial Camera	Won	
1999	The Volcano (Der Vulkan)	Montreal World Film Festival	Best Actress	Won	
2000		Berlin International Film Festival	Shooting Stars Award by European Film Promotion	Won	
2002	Toter Mann	German Television Awards	Best Actress in a Movie Made for Television	Nominated	
2004	Wolfsburg	German Film Awards	Best Performance by an Actress in a Leading Role	Nominated	
2004	Wolfsburg	German Television Awards	Best Actress in a Movie Made for Television	Nominated	
2006	The White Masai	Bavarian Film Awards	Best Actress (Darstellerpreis)	Won	
2007	Yella	Bambi Awards	Best Actress - National	Nominated	
2007	Yella	Berlin International Film Festival	Silver Bear for Best Actress	Won	
2007	Yella	German Film Awards	Best Performance by an Actress in a Leading Role	Won	
2008	Yella	Jupiter Award	Best German Actress	Won	
2012	Barbara	Capri Hollywood Film Festival	Best Actress	Won	
2012	Barbara	Dublin Film Critics Circle Awards	Best Actress	Nominated	
2012	Barbara	European Film Awards	Best Actress	Nominated	
2012	Barbara	Indiewire Critics' Poll	Best Actress	Nominated	
2012	Barbara	Village Voice Film Poll	Best Actress	Nominated	
2013	Barbara	German Film Critics Association Awards	Best Actress (Beste Darstellerin)	Nominated	
2013	Barbara	International Cinephile Society Awards	Best Actress	Nominated	
2014	Fenster zum Sommer	Jupiter Awards	Best German TV Actress	Nominated	
2015	Phoenix	Dublin Film Critics Circle Awards	Best Actress	Nominated	
2015	Phoenix	German Film Awards	Best Performance by an Actress in a Leading Role	Nominated	
2015	Phoenix	Indiewire Critics' Poll	Best Lead Actress	Nominated	
2015	Phoenix	Jupiter Award	Best German Actress	Nominated	
2015	Phoenix	Mons International Festival of Love Films	Best Actress	Won	
2015	Phoenix	Seattle International Film Festival	Best Actress	Won	
2015	Phoenix	Toronto Film Critics Association Awards	Best Actress	Won	
2015	Phoenix	Village Voice Film Poll	Best Actress	Nominated	
2016	Phoenix	Chlotrudis Awards	Best Actress	Nominated	
2016	Phoenix	International Cinephile Society Awards	Best Actress	Nominated	
2016	Phoenix	National Society of Film Critics Awards	Best Actress	Nominated	
2016	Phoenix	Seattle Film Critics Awards	Best Actress	Won	
2016	Homeland	Screen Actors Guild Awards	Outstanding Performance by an Ensemble in a Drama Series	Nominated	
2019	The Audition	San Sebastián International Film Festival	Silver Shell for Best Actress	Won	
2019	The Audition	Stockholm Film Festival	Best Actress	Won	
2020	The Audition	Días de Cine Awards	Best Foreign Actress	Nominated	
2020	Pelican Blood	Guenter Rohrbach Filmpreis	Best Female Actor	Won	
2020	My Little Sister	European Film Awards	Best Actress	Nominated	
2020	My Little Sister	German Screen Actors Awards	Best Leading Actress (Beste Hauptdarstellerin)	Nominated	
2021	My Little Sister	Festival del Cinema Europeo	Best European Actor	Won	
2021	The Audition	German Film Critics Association Awards	Best Actress (Beste Darstellerin)	Won	
2021	Pelican Blood	German Film Critics Association Awards	Best Actress (Beste Darstellerin)	Won	
2022	Tár	Florida Film Critics Circle	Best Supporting Actress	Won (Note: Tied with Jessie Buckley for Women Talking.)	
2022	Tár	Gotham Independent Film Awards	Outstanding Supporting Performance	Nominated	
2023	Tár	Dorian Awards	Supporting Film Performance of the Year	Nominated	
2023	Tár	Independent Spirit Awards	Best Supporting Performance	Nominated	
2023	Tár	London Film Critics' Circle	Supporting Actress of the Year	Nominated	
2023	Tár	Minnesota Film Critics Alliance	Best Supporting Actress	Nominated	
2023	Tár	National Society of Film Critics	Best Supporting Actress	2nd place	
2023	Tár	North Dakota Film Society	Best Supporting Actress	Nominated	
2023	Tár	San Diego Film Critics Society	Best Supporting Actress	Nominated	
2023	Tár	San Francisco Bay Area Film Critics Circle	Best Supporting Actress	Nominated	
2025	Hedda	Alliance of Women Film Journalists	Best Supporting Actress	Nominated	
2025	Hedda	Astra Film Awards	Best Supporting Actress - Drama	Nominated	
2025	Hedda	Chicago Film Critics Association	Best Supporting Actress	Nominated	
2025	Hedda	Independent Spirit Awards	Best Supporting Performance	Nominated	
2025	Hedda	San Diego Film Critics Society	Best Supporting Actress	Runner-up (Note: Tied with Wunmi Mosaku for Sinners.)	
2025	Hedda	Toronto Film Critics Association	Outstanding Supporting Performance	Won (Note: Shared with Benicio del Toro for One Battle After Another.)	
2025	Hedda	Toronto International Film Festival	TIFF Tribute Performance Award	Won	
2025	Hedda	Middleburg Film Festival	Excellence in Acting Award	Won	
