= Harun Farocki =

German filmmaker, author, and lecturer in film (1944–2014)

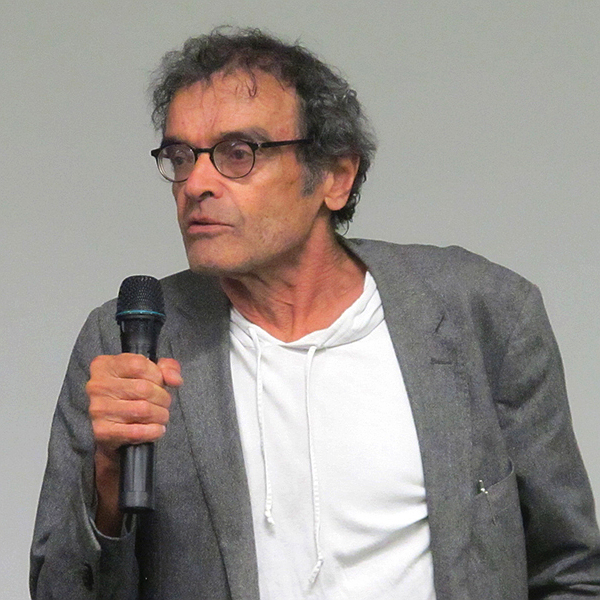
- Farocki in 2013
- Born: Harun El Osman Faroqhi; 9 January 1944; Neutitschein, Sudetenland, Germany
- Died: 30 July 2014 (aged 70)
- Occupations: Filmmaker, writer
- Spouse(s): Ursula Lefkes (m. 1966; died 1996) Antje Ehmann (m. 2001)
- Children: 2

Harun Farocki (9 January 1944 – 30 July 2014) was a German filmmaker, author, and film theorist.

== Early life ==
Farocki was born as Harun El Usman Faroqhi in Neutitschein, Reichsgau Sudetenland, Germany (now Nový Jičín in the Czech Republic) to Abdul Qudus Faroqui, a physician who immigrated to Germany from India in the 1921, and Lili, a German woman. Farocki's family was evacuated from Berlin due to the Allied bombing of Germany. Farocki's father had moved to Germany in order to study engineering and had originally been involved in socialist anti-colonialist politics in Berlin and Paris before earning his doctorate in history at the University of Gießen and a medical degree. In the 1930s, he gained the trust of the Nazi regime and became the announcer for Urdu-language Reichs-Rundfunk-Gesellschaft transmissions aimed at India, as well as a writer of pro-German propaganda.

Farocki simplified the spelling of his surname as a young man. After World War II, Farocki grew up in India and Indonesia before the family returned to Germany in 1958, first to Bad Godesberg (where he attended the Aloisiuskolleg) and later to Hamburg, where his father established a successful surgical practice.

Farocki, who was deeply influenced by Bertolt Brecht and Jean-Luc Godard, studied at the German Film and Television Academy Berlin (dffb) from 1966 to 1968. There, in the mid-1960s, he began making films which, from the very beginning, were non-narrative essays on the politics of imagery.

== Work ==
Farocki made over 90 films, including film essays, documentaries, shorts and feature films. His practice combined essay film, political analysis, media archaeology, and installation art. Farocki was particularly concerned with the politics of images, how images are produced, circulated, and operationalized within systems of power such as the military, industry, surveillance, and advertising.

From 1974 to 1984, when its publication ceased, Farocki edited the magazine Filmkritik, which served as a crucial forum for politically engaged film theory in West Germany. From 1993 to 1999, Farocki taught at the University of California, Berkeley. He later was a professor at the Academy of Fine Arts Vienna. In his 2000-2003 three-part installation, Eye/Machine, Farocki coined the term "operational image".

His 2007 twelve-channel video installation Deep Play, first shown at documenta 12, used footage, computer-generated visualizations and data from the 2006 FIFA World Cup final.

Farocki's works Serious Games I-IV (2009-10) are a series of four video installations featuring footage recorded at different US military sites where computer-game technology was used to train soldiers, as well as treat them for post-traumatic stress disorder (PTSD). The series was ranked No. 20 in Frieze's list of "The 25 Best Works of the 21st Century".

== Exhibitions ==
Farocki's work was included in the 2004–05 Carnegie International at the Carnegie Museum of Art in Pittsburgh, Pennsylvania.

In 2006, the Austrian Film Museum in Vienna presented a retrospective of Farocki's film and video work. The programme included 36 works as well as a carte blanche selected by Farocki and Antje Ehmann.

The following year, Farocki participated in documenta 12 in Kassel, where he presented the twelve-channel installation Deep Play.

A first major UK retrospective of his films was held at Tate Modern in 2009.

Also in 2009, the Jeu de Paume in Paris presented a retrospective of Farocki's films. It ran alongside HF | RG, an exhibition bringing together works by Farocki and Rodney Graham.

From October 2010 to January 2011, the Kunsthaus Bregenz presented Soft Montages, a retrospective of Farocki's installations and films. The exhibition included works from the Serious Games series as well as earlier multi-channel installations.

The 2011 exhibition "Harun Farocki: Images of War (at a Distance)" at the Museum of Modern Art was the first comprehensive solo exhibition of Farocki's work in a U.S. museum. It featured a major acquisition of around 36 works spanning four decades, including the U.S. premiere of Serious Games I–IV and seminal works such as Videograms of a Revolution.

Farocki's works were exhibited in a major showcase in Brazil at Paço das Artes in 2015, curated by Jane de Almeida.

In 2016, the Fundació Antoni Tàpies in Barcelona presented Harun Farocki. Empathy, an exhibition of his films and video installations curated by Antje Ehmann and Carles Guerra.

A further exhibition of Farocki's work was held in Brazil at the Moreira Salles Institute in 2019, curated by Antje Ehmann and Heloisa Espada.

== Personal life ==
Farocki's sister, Suraiya Faroqhi, is a prominent scholar of the Ottoman Empire. Farocki's first wife, Ursula Lefkes, whom he married in 1966, died in 1996.

Farocki died on 30 July 2014, aged 70. His survivors include his second wife, Antje Ehmann, whom he married in 2001; twin daughters from his first marriage, Annabel Lee and Larissa Lu; and eight grandchildren.

== Films (selection) ==
(D = Director, E = Editor, S = Screenplay, P = Production, A = Actor)

- 1967: Die Worte des Vorsitzenden - The Words of The Chairman
- 1969: Nicht löschbares Feuer - Inextinguishable Fire (Short, D)
- 1970: Die Teilung aller Tage - The Division of All Days (D, E, S)
- 1971: Eine Sache, die sich versteht (D, S, P)
- 1975: By Hook or by Crook (S)
- 1978: Zwischen zwei Kriegen (Between Two Wars) (D, E, S, P) - Himself / narrator
- 1979: Ich räume auf (A) - Herausgeber
- 1980: Henry Angst (A)
- 1982: Etwas wird sichtbar - Before Your Eyes Vietnam (D, S, P, A)
- 1983: Ein Bild - An Image
- 1983: Jean-Marie Straub and Danièle Huillet (at work on Franz Kafka's "Amerika")
- 1984: Klassenverhältnisse (Straub-Huillet's) (A) - Delamarche
- 1985: Betrogen (Betrayed) (D, S)
- 1986: Wie man sieht (As You See) (D, S, P)
- 1987: Bilderkrieg (D)
- 1987: Die Schulung
- 1988: Bilder der Welt und Inschrift des Krieges (Images of the World and the Inscription of War) (D, S, P)
- 1990: Leben: BRD - How to live in the Federal Republic of Germany (D, S, P)
- 1991: Was ist los? - What's up? (D, S)
- 1992: Videogramme einer Revolution (Videograms of a Revolution) (D, S, P)
- 1994: Die Umschulung
- 1995: Arbeiter verlassen die Fabrik (Workers Leaving the Factory)
- 1995: Schnittstelle
- 1996: Der Auftritt - The Appearance
- 1997: Die Bewerbung - The Interview (TV) (D, S)
- 1997: Stilleben - Still Life (D, S)
- 1997: Nach dem Spiel (P)
- 1998: Worte und Spiele
- 2000: Die innere Sicherheit - The State I Am In (S)
- 2000: Gefängnisbilder (Prison Images) (D, S)
- 2001: Auge/Maschine
- 2001: Die Schöpfer der Einkaufswelten - The Creators of the Shopping Worlds (D, S)
- 2003: Erkennen und Verfolgen (D, S, P)
- 2004: Nicht ohne Risiko (D, S, P)
- 2005: Die Hochzeitsfabrik (P)
- 2005: Ghosts (S)
- 2006: Am Rand der Städte (P)
- 2007: Aufschub
- 2007: Respite - first episode of Memories (Jeonju Digital Project 2007)
- 2009: Zum Vergleich (D, S)
- 2009-2010: Serious Games I-IV Video series
- 2012: Barbara (S)
- 2014: Phoenix (S)

== Academic articles ==
- Embodied histories. Harun Farocki and Andrei Ujică's Videograms of a Revolution.
- Pantenburg, Volker: Farocki/Godard: Film as Theory. Amsterdam: Amsterdam University Press 2015.
