= Something to Remind Me =

2001 German psychological thriller film

- Written by: Christian Petzold
- Directed by: Christian Petzold
- Starring: Nina Hoss; André Hennicke
- Music by: Stefan Will
- Country of origin: Germany
- Original language: German

Production
- Producers: Bettina Reitz; Christian Rohde
- Cinematography: Hans Fromm
- Editor: Bettina Böhler
- Running time: 90 minutes

Original release
- Release: October 2001

Something to Remind Me (German: Toter Mann) is a 2001 German psychological thriller film directed by Christian Petzold.

== Cast and characters ==
- Nina Hoss as Leyla
- André Hennicke as Thomas Richter
- Sven Pippig as Blum
- Heinrich Schmieder as Richard
- Kathrin Angerer as Sophie
- Henning Peker as Ott
- Michael Gerber as Makler
- Franziska Troegner as Peggy
- Johannes Hitzblech as Seifert
- Hilmar Baumann as building superintendent
- Rainer Laupichler as police officer
