= Undine (2020 film) =

2020 film

- Film poster
- Directed by: Christian Petzold
- Written by: Christian Petzold
- Produced by: Florian Koerner von Gustorf; Michael Weber
- Starring: Paula Beer; Franz Rogowski
- Cinematography: Hans Fromm
- Edited by: Bettina Böhler
- Release dates: 23 February 2020 (Berlinale); 11 June 2020 (Germany)
- Running time: 90 minutes
- Countries: Germany; France
- Language: German
- Box office: $1.1 million

Undine is a 2020 German-French romantic fantasy drama film directed by Christian Petzold. It had its world premiere on 23 February 2020 at the 70th Berlin International Film Festival, where it was selected to compete for the Golden Bear in the competition section. Paula Beer won the Silver Bear for Best Actress. It was released in theaters starting in Germany on 11 June 2020.

== Plot ==
Undine Wibeau, a historian who lectures on the urban development of Berlin, is broken up with by a married man with whom she is having an affair, Johannes. She tells him that if he leaves her she will have to kill him, a reference to the myth of undine, and asks him to wait at a café for her while she delivers a lecture. After the lecture, she returns to the café to find he has left. While looking for him, a man who attended her lecture, Christoph, introduces himself to her, telling her that he is an industrial diver and asking her to have a coffee. Christoph accidentally breaks the aquarium in the café and the two are ejected. The two begin a passionate relationship.

Christoph is fixing a turbine in the Lingese when he sees a giant Wels catfish that he and his colleagues affectionally refer to as Big Gunther. Later, he and Undine meet up and he takes her diving. Undine floats away and almost drowns, but Christoph is able to drag her to shore and revive her. Before she returns to Berlin, he gives her a small statue of a diver. He visits her at her apartment in Berlin, and while the two are out walking they pass Johannes and his partner Nora, with Undine and Johannes sharing a knowing look at one another.

After Christoph leaves, Johannes asks to meet with Undine, telling her he has made a mistake and should not have ended their relationship, but she rejects him. In the evening, Undine receives a call from Christoph asking about Johannes. Christoph asks Undine if she was in love with Johannes, but does not believe Undine when she denies it and hangs up. Undine leaves Christoph a voicemail, but after receiving no response by the morning decides to visit him. Arriving at the Lingese, she discovers that an accident left Christoph trapped underwater without air for 12 minutes and he has been hospitalized in a braindead state. She tells Christoph's colleague, Monika, about the phone call, but Monika tells her that Christoph's accident happened the previous afternoon, before the time of the phone call, and accuses Undine of lying.

Undine visits Johannes at his home, where he is swimming. While Nora is in the house, Undine enters the pool and drowns Johannes, then walks to a body of water and submerges herself. At the same moment, Christoph wakes up yelling her name. Christoph travels to Berlin to look for Undine, but visiting her apartment he finds a couple he does not recognize, who tell him that the apartments are for short-term leases and Undine must have left already. He visits her work, where one of her co-workers tells him that Undine was a freelancer and she has not seen her in months.

Two years later, Christoph is now living with Monika, who is pregnant. He is asked to work on the turbines in the Lingese again. While diving there, he encounters Undine, who takes his hand. When he emerges, he inspects the video feed, but finds no trace of her. That night, he returns to the Lingese and submerges himself, despite Monika's cries. He sees Undine once again. As Monika sits alone by the water, Christoph returns and embraces her, holding the statue of the diver.

== Cast ==
- Paula Beer as Undine Wibeau
- Franz Rogowski as Christoph
- Jacob Matschenz as Johannes
- Maryam Zaree as Monika
- Julia Franz Richter as Nora
- Rafael Stachowiak as Jochen
- Anne Ratte-Polle as Anna
- Gloria Endres de Oliveira as Antonia
- José Barros as Miguel

== Reception ==
Undine grossed $78,689 in North America and $932,147 worldwide. The film holds an 89% approval rating on review aggregator Rotten Tomatoes, based on 142 reviews, with an average of 7.3/10. The website's critical consensus reads, "Undine draws on folklore for a dark fantasy whose murky storytelling is often offset by the enchanting romance at its core." On Metacritic, it holds a rating of 75 out of 100, based on 32 critics, indicating "generally favorable reviews".
