= Ghosts (2005 film) =

2005 German drama film

Gespenster (Ghosts)
- Gespenster (Ghosts)
- Directed by: Christian Petzold
- Written by: Christian Petzold; Harun Farocki
- Produced by: Florian Koerner von Gustorf; Michael Weber
- Starring: Julia Hammer; Sabine Timoteo; Marianne Basler; Aurélien Recoing; Benno Fürmann
- Cinematography: Hans Fromm
- Edited by: Bettina Böhler
- Music by: Marco Dreckkötter; Stefan Will
- Release date: September 15, 2005
- Running time: 86 minutes
- Country: Germany
- Languages: German, French

Gespenster is a 2005 German film directed by Christian Petzold and written by Petzold and Harun Farocki. The film, which follows a teenage orphan through Berlin over 24 hours, was presented at the 2005 Berlin International Film Festival, where it was officially entered into competition.

== Plot ==
Nina, an introverted and melancholic teenage orphan who lives in a group home, has a chance encounter with Toni, an impulsive and delinquent street child, while performing menial work in a Berlin city park. Toni follows Nina back to the group home, where they kiss, and runs away from the home with her. She enlists Nina in a casting where they each tell fictional stories of how they met; the pair's off-kilter performance (Toni recites an upbeat story, and Nina improvises a dark and enigmatic one) impresses the director Oliver, who invites them to a party later.

Meanwhile, Françoise, a French woman, is released from a psychiatric hospital and reunites with her husband Pierre. Pierre patiently entertains Françoise's belief that she will find her daughter Marie, who was kidnapped in Berlin when she was three and subsequently disappeared. While loitering near the site of Marie's kidnapping she encounters Nina, and immediately believes her to be Marie; her belief is further substantiated by a distinct scar and mole. Toni finds Nina and Françoise and is disturbed by the interaction. She pickpockets Françoise and pulls Nina away from her, discarding Françoise's wallet in the process.

That night, Toni and Nina come to Oliver's swanky party. They intimately dance with each other in front of Oliver, to his wife's horror. The next morning, Nina wakes up alone. Oliver's wife tells her that Toni left to "fuck" Oliver. Nina wanders back to where she had earlier met Françoise, who is waiting there and overjoyed by her return. Françoise and Nina have breakfast together, but Pierre tells Françoise that they must leave. He hands Nina a few bills; when Nina says that she wants to be with her "mama", Pierre coldly tells her that Marie is dead.

Once again alone, Nina retrieves Françoise's pickpocketed wallet, where she finds photos of Marie and a forensic age progression which bears a striking resemblance to herself. She discards the photos and walks away.

== Cast ==
- Julia Hummer - Nina:
- Sabine Timoteo - Toni
- Marianne Basler - Françoise
- Aurélien Recoing - Pierre
- Benno Fürmann - Oliver
- Anna Schudt - Kai
- Claudia Geisler-Bading - Heimleiterin
- Philipp Hauß - Mathias
- Victoria Trauttmansdorff - Mathias' Mutter

== Awards ==
- 2005: Findling Award
- 2006: German Film Critics Association Award - Best Feature
