= Barbara Auer =

German actress

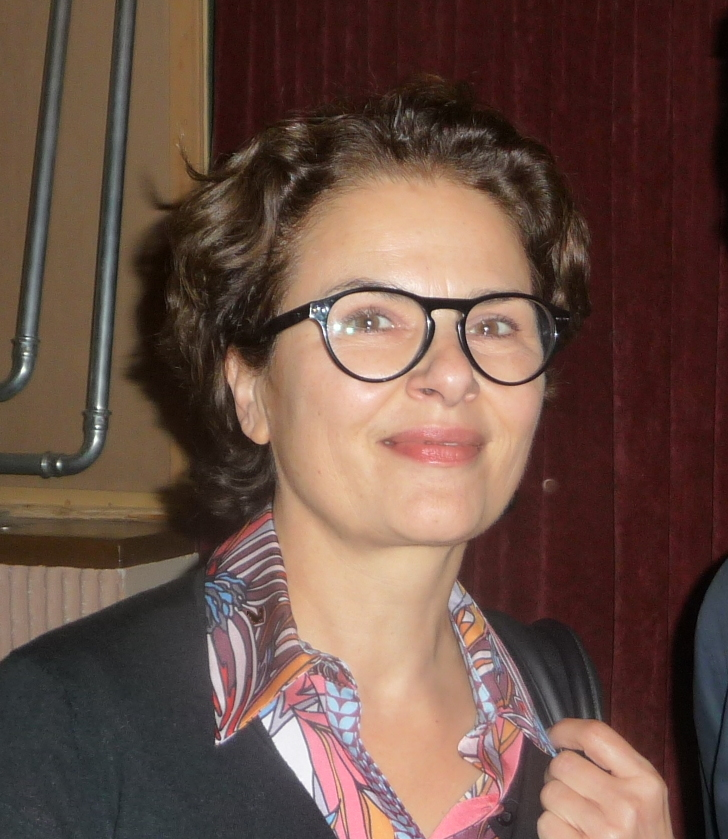
- Barbara Auer (2018)
- Born: 1 February 1959 (age 67); Konstanz, West Germany
- Occupation: Actress
- Years active: 1987–present

Barbara Auer (German: [ˈbaʁbaʁa ˈaʊ̯ɐ]; born 1 February 1959) is a German actress. She has appeared in multiple television shows and films including My Daughter Belongs to Me (for which she won a German Film Award for "Best Actress"), Impossibly Yours, Waiting for Angelina, and The Book Thief.

== Awards ==
- 1989: Goldene Kamera for The Boss from the West
- 1991: Special Prize of the German Academy of Performing Arts for Die Arbeitersaga: Das Lachen der Maca Daracs
- 1993: German Film Awards "Best Actress" for My Daughter Belongs to Me
- 1995: Telestar "Best Actress" in a Move Made For TV" for Der große Abgang
- 2019: Fünf Seen Filmfestival "Hannelore-Elsner-Award" for Best Art of Acting

== Selected filmography ==
- The Boss from the West (dir. Vivian Naefe, 1988, TV film), as Jessica
- The Play with Billions (dir. Peter Keglevic, 1989, TV film), as Larissa Asselt
- Verfolgte Wege (dir. Uwe Janson, 1989), as Marie
- Mit Leib und Seele (1989–1990, TV series, 19 episodes), as Annemarie Bieler
- Herzlich willkommen (dir. Hark Bohm, 1990), as Elke Kramer
- Café Europa (dir. Franz Xaver Bogner, 1990), as Nana Schröder
- A Crazy Couple (dir. Sönke Wortmann, 1990), as Jana
- Heart in the Hand (dir. Uwe Janson, 1991), as Ena
- The Terrible Threesome (dir. Hermine Huntgeburth, 1991), as Maria Grund
- My Daughter Belongs to Me (dir. Vivian Naefe, 1991, TV film), as Ruth
- Die Arbeitersaga: Das Lachen der Maca Daracs (dir. Dieter Berner, 1991, TV film), as Maca Daracs
- Night on Fire (dir. Markus Fischer, 1992), as Uta Schwengeler
- Madregilda (dir. Francisco Regueiro, 1993), as Madregilda
- Women Are Simply Wonderful (dir. Sherry Hormann, 1994), as Kim
- Der große Abgang (dir. Nico Hofmann, 1995, TV film), as Irmgard Bode
- Nikolaikirche (dir. Frank Beyer, 1995, TV film), as Astrid Protter
- Reise nach Weimar (dir. Dominik Graf, 1996, TV film), as Mafalda La Rocca
- Solo for Clarinet (dir. Nico Hofmann, 1998), as Lydia Kominka
- Waiting Means Death (dir. Hartmut Schoen, 1999, TV film), as Gertrud Venske
- The State I Am In (dir. Christian Petzold, 2000), as Clara
- Donna Leon (2000–2002, TV series, 4 episodes), as Paola Brunetti
- The Other Woman (dir. Margarethe von Trotta, 2004, TV film), as Yvonne Schumacher
- Impossibly Yours (dir. Torsten C. Fischer, 2006), as Marlene
- Nachtschicht (since 2006, TV series, 15 episodes), as Lisa Brenner
- The Other Boy (dir. Volker Einrauch, 2007), as Sylvie Wagner
- Waiting for Angelina (dir. Hans-Christoph Blumenberg, 2008), as Marlene
- At Any Second (dir. Jan Fehse, 2008), as Anna Frick
- Effi Briest (dir. Hermine Huntgeburth, 2009), as Johanna
- The Last 30 Years (dir. Michael Gutmann, 2010, TV film), as Resa Schade
- The Weekend (dir. Nina Grosse, 2012), as Tina Kessler
- Where Friendship Ends (dir. Stefan Krohmer, 2013, TV film), as Heike Rogel
- Take Good Care of Him (dir. Johannes Fabrick, 2013, TV film), as Lene
- The Book Thief (dir. Brian Percival, 2013), as Ilsa Hermann
- Death of a Girl (dir. Thomas Berger, 2015, TV film), as Hella Christensen
- Grzimek (dir. Roland Suso Richter, 2015, TV film), as Hildegard Grzimek
- Jonathan (dir. Piotr J. Lewandowski, 2016), as Martha
