= Pelican Blood (2019 film) =

2019 film directed by Katrin Gebbe

- Film poster
- Directed by: Katrin Gebbe
- Produced by: Verena Gräfe-Höft; Mila Voinikova
- Starring: Nina Hoss
- Cinematography: Moritz Schultheiß
- Edited by: Heike Gnida
- Music by: Johannes Lehniger
- Release dates: 28 August 2019 (Venice); 24 September 2020 (German cinemas)
- Running time: 121 minutes
- Countries: Germany; Bulgaria
- Language: German

Pelican Blood (German: Pelikanblut) is a 2019 German-Bulgarian drama horror film directed by Katrin Gebbe and starring Nina Hoss. The film was screened in the Horizons section at the 76th Venice International Film Festival.

It received the Méliès d'Or for Best European Fantastic Film.

== Premise ==
“A woman who trains police horses adopts her second child, a severely traumatised 5-year-old girl. When the girl shows violent and anti-social behaviour, her new mother becomes determined to help her.”

== Cast ==
- Nina Hoss as Wiebke
- Katerina Lipovska as Raya
- Yana Marinova as Sigrid
- Murathan Muslu as Benedict
- Sophie Pfennigstorf as Alma
- Dimitar Banenkin as Hagen
- Daniela Holtz as Bibi

== Critical reception ==
The film holds an approval rating of 74% on Rotten Tomatoes, with an average rating of 7/10 based on 19 reviews and has a Letterboxd rating of 3.2/5.
