= Florian Gärtner =

German film director and writer (born 1968)

- Born: 23 April 1968 (age 58); Korbach, West Germany
- Occupations: Director, Writer
- Years active: 1990—present

Florian Gärtner (born 23 April 1968 in Korbach) is a German film director and author.

== Life and career ==
Florian Gärtner grew up in Marburg and London. He studied English literature and media studies at Philipps University, Marburg and the Free University, Berlin. At age 15, Gärtner made his first home movie. He continued making shorts and eventually award-winning feature-length Super-8-films throughout his school and university years.

Gärtner's film Dragonland premiered at the Max Ophüls Film Festival in 1999, where it won the Interfilmpreis. The film also screened at the Berlin Film Festival 1999.

Florian Gärtner lives in Berlin.

== Filmography ==
- 1993: Extraterrestrial (director, screenplay)
- 1996: No One but Me (director, screenplay)
- 1999: Dragonland (director, screenplay)
- 2003: Sex Up (director, screenplay)
- 2003: Oh Mother (Director, screenplay)
- 2005: Sex Up 2 (director, screenplay)
- 2007: Second Life (director, screenplay)
- 2008: The Lightship (director)
- 2008: Instructor Schmidt (screenplay)
- 2012: Some Like It Happy (director)
- 2012: A Special Band (director)
- 2012: A Small Thing (director, screenplay)
- 2013: Separation the Italian Way (director)
- 2015: Tatort: Borowski and the Kids from Gaarden (director)
- 2017: Brown Bread in Thailand (director, screenplay)
- 2018: Lotta and the Serious Side of Life (director)
- 2019: A Summer on Mallorca (director)
- 2019: Real Guys (director)
- 2020: Clueless in Ireland (director)
