= Christian Petzold (director) =

German film director

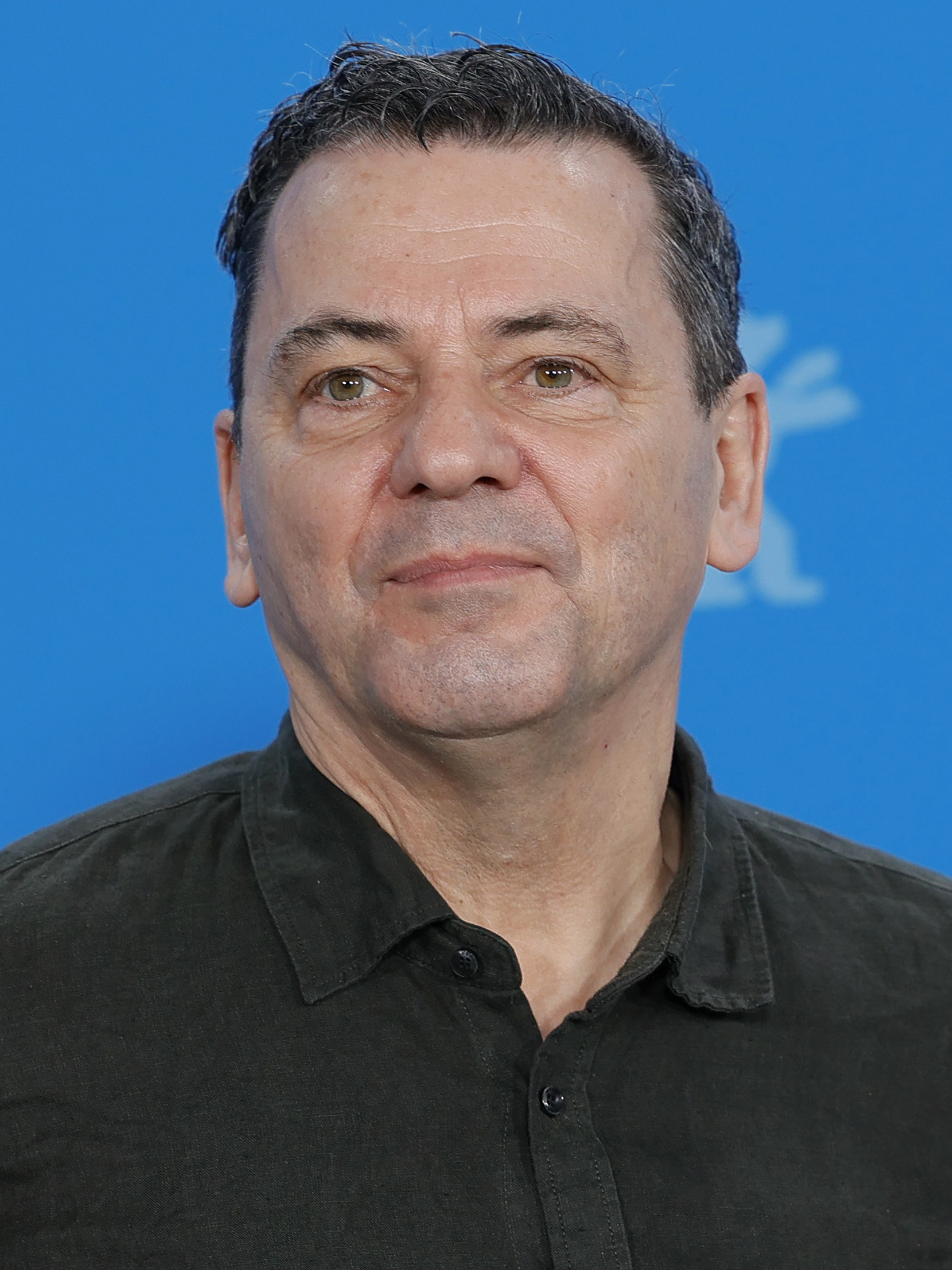
- Petzold in 2024
- Born: 14 September 1960 (age 66); Hilden, West Germany
- Occupation: Film director
- Years active: 1988–present

Christian Petzold (born 1960) is a German film director and screenwriter. Petzold is part of the 21st century Berlin School film movement. His films have received international recognition and acclaim. He is known for his frequent collaborations with actresses Nina Hoss and Paula Beer. Petzold won the Silver Bear for Best Director for his film Barbara (2012) at the 62nd Berlin International Film Festival.

Petzold started his career with his "Ghosts Trilogy" which consist of the films The State I Am In (2000), Ghosts (2005), and Yella (2007). He has earned further acclaim directing Jerichow (2008), Barbara (2012), Phoenix (2014), Transit (2018), Undine (2020), and Afire (2023).

== Early life and education ==
Born in Hilden and raised in Haan, where he graduated from high school in 1979, Petzold fulfilled his military civil service in a small cinema club of a local YMCA, showing films to troubled adolescents. From 1981 on he lived in Berlin, where he studied theatre and German studies at the Free University of Berlin. From 1988 to 1994, he studied film at the German Film and Television Academy Berlin (dffb) where he studied with mentors who "included filmmakers, media artists, and media theorists Harun Farocki and Hartmut Bitomsky, who are both known for their non-narrative films, video work, and film installations in galleries and museums." While at dffb, Petzold appeared in Thomas Arslan's short experimental film 19 Porträts (1990), a 16-millimeter black-and-white film in the tradition of Andy Warhol's Screen Tests.

== Career ==
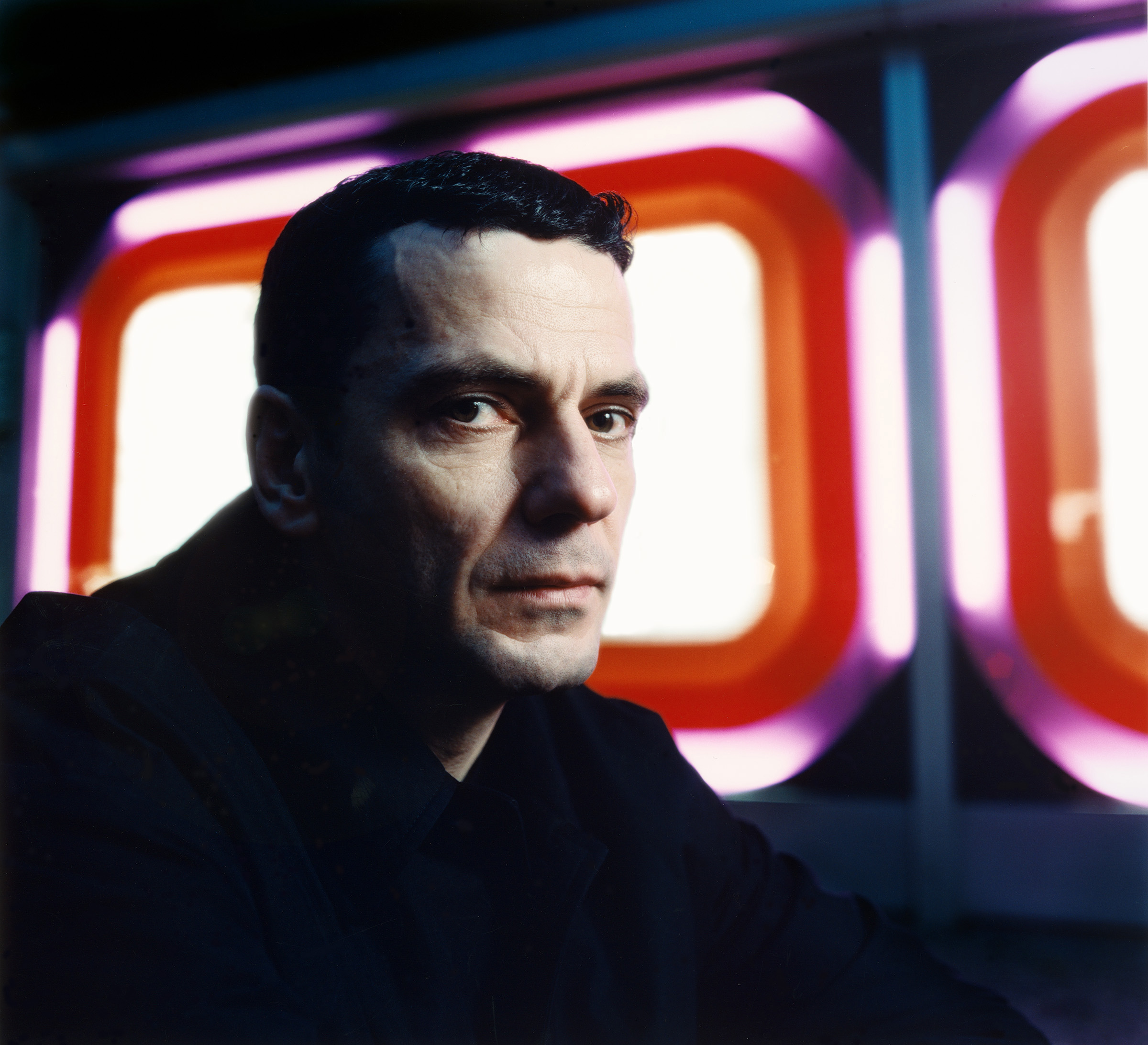
Christian Petzold in 2002

His first film was Pilotinnen, which he directed for his film school graduation in 1995. While The State I Am In (German: Die innere Sicherheit) (2000) was his first feature film, also noting his first collaboration with Harun Farocki. In 2005, his film Gespenster was presented at the Berlin International Film Festival, as was his 2007 film Yella. Petzold writes his own screenplays, and often collaborated with Harun Farocki early in his career. As his former teacher at dffb, Farocki was a major influence on Petzold, who, along with Angela Schanelec and Thomas Arslan, is generally considered to be part of the Berlin School.

While the Berlin School is often associated with a new turn towards realism and political cinema, Petzold's films, while they address issues of work and employment, also deal with conflicts between life and death. In Gespenster the protagonist leads a ghost-like existence. In Yella the protagonist is, possibly, already dead at the beginning of the film. These three films came to be called the "Gespenster Trilogy".

The 2008 film Jerichow was his fourth collaboration with Nina Hoss after Something to Remind Me (German: Toter Mann), Wolfsburg and Yella. The drama concerns a soldier who, having returned from Afghanistan to Prignitz, becomes involved in a relationship with a married woman. The movie was nominated in the main competition at the 65th Venice International Film Festival in 2008. In 2009, Petzold received a 'best director' nomination for the Deutscher Filmpreis award.

Although more famous as a director of film and television, Petzold has also staged Arthur Schnitzler's The Lonely Way (German: Der einsame Weg) at the Deutsches Theater following an invitation by Oliver Reese. The drama, with Nina Hoss as protagonist, premiered on 14 March 2009.

Petzold's film Barbara competed in competition at the 62nd Berlin International Film Festival and Petzold won the Silver Bear for Best Director. The film was selected as the German entry for the Best Foreign Language Oscar at the 85th Academy Awards, but it did not make the final shortlist. The film became Petzold's greatest box office success, grossing $4,129,250 worldwide.

== Other activities ==
In 2023, Petzold served on the official selection jury for the 71st San Sebastián International Film Festival, chaired by Claire Denis.

== Political views ==
In December 2023, alongside 50 other filmmakers, Petzold signed an open letter published in Libération demanding a ceasefire and an end to the killing of civilians amid the 2023 Israeli invasion of the Gaza Strip, and for a humanitarian corridor into Gaza to be established for humanitarian aid, and the release of hostages.

== Filmography ==
=== Feature films ===
Year	English title	Original title	Notes
2000	The State I Am In	Die innere Sicherheit	Part 1 of the "Ghosts" Trilogy
2001	Something to Remind Me	Toter Mann	
2003	Wolfsburg		
2005	Ghosts	Gespenster	Part 2 of the "Ghosts" Trilogy
2007	Yella		Part 3 of the "Ghosts" Trilogy
2008	Jerichow		
2012	Barbara		Part 1 of the "Love in Times of Oppressive Systems" Trilogy
2014	Phoenix		Part 2 of the "Love in Times of Oppressive Systems" Trilogy
2018	Transit		Part 3 of the "Love in Times of Oppressive Systems" Trilogy
2020	Undine		
2023	Afire	Roter Himmel	
2025	Miroirs No. 3		

=== Short films ===
Year	Title	Credited as		Notes
Year	Title	Director	Writer	Notes
1988	Ich arbeite alles ab... Ehrenwort!	Yes	No	Short film
1990	Süden	Yes	Yes	Documentary short; Also cinematographer and editor
1991	Ostwärts	Yes	Yes	Documentary short; Also cinematographer
1992	The Warm Money	Yes	Yes	Short film

=== Television ===
Television
Year	Title	Credited as		Notes
Year	Title	Director	Writer	Notes
1995	Pilots	Yes	Yes	TV movie
1996	Cuba Libre	Yes	Yes	TV movie
1998	The Sex Thief	Yes	Yes	TV movie
2001	Something to Remind Me	Yes	Yes	TV movie
2011	Dreileben - Beats Being Dead	Yes	Yes	TV movie
2015–18	Police call 110	Yes	Yes	TV series; 3 episodes

== Accolades ==
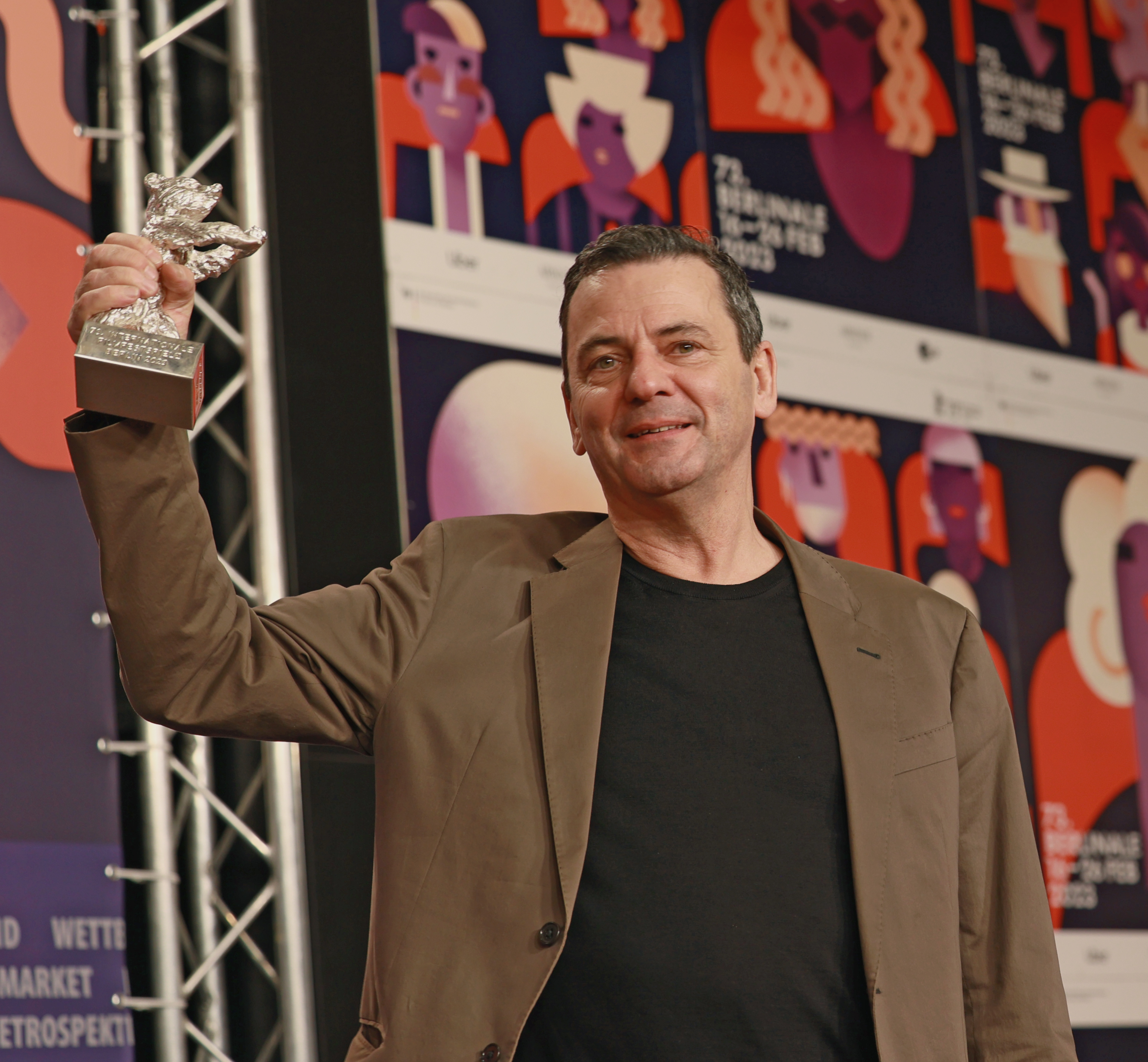
Petzold with the Silver Bear Grand Jury Prize for Afire, at Berlinale 2023

Year	Award	Nominated work	Category	Result	Ref.
2003	Berlin International Film Festival	Wolfsburg	FIPRESCI Prize	Won	
2005	Berlin International Film Festival	Gespenster	Golden Bear	Nominated	
2007	Berlin International Film Festival	Yella	Golden Bear	Nominated	
2012	Berlin International Film Festival	Barbara	Golden Bear	Nominated	
2012	Berlin International Film Festival	Barbara	Silver Bear for Best Director	Won	
2012	Berlin International Film Festival	Barbara	Reader Jury of the "Berliner Morgenpost"	Won	
2018	Berlin International Film Festival	Transit	Golden Bear	Nominated	
2020	Berlin International Film Festival	Undine	Golden Bear	Nominated	
2020	Berlin International Film Festival	Undine	FIPRESCI Prize	Won	
2023	Berlin International Film Festival	Afire	Golden Bear	Nominated	
2023	Berlin International Film Festival	Afire	Silver Bear Grand Jury Prize	Won	
2012	European Film Awards	Barbara	Best Film	Nominated	
2012	European Film Awards	Barbara	People's Choice Award	Nominated	
2020	European Film Awards	Undine	Best Film	Nominated	
2000	Venice Film Festival	The State I Am In	Cinema of the Present - Lion of the Year	Nominated	
2008	Venice Film Festival	Jerichow	Golden Lion	Nominated	
