= Wolfsburg (film) =

2003 German film

- Directed by: Christian Petzold
- Written by: Christian Petzold
- Produced by: Bettina Reitz
- Starring: Benno Fürmann; Nina Hoss; Stephan Kampwirth
- Cinematography: Hans Fromm
- Edited by: Bettina Böhler
- Music by: Stefan Will
- Release date: 25 September 2003
- Running time: 90 minutes
- Country: Germany
- Language: German
- Budget: €2,600,000 (estimated)

Wolfsburg is a 2003 German film directed by Christian Petzold, starring Benno Fürmann, Nina Hoss and Astrid Meyerfeldt.

== Cast ==
- Benno Fürmann as Philipp Gerber
- Nina Hoss as Laura Reiser
- Antje Westermann as Katja
- Astrid Meyerfeldt as Vera
- Matthias Matschke as Scholz
- Soraya Gomaa as Françoise
- Stephan Kampwirth as Klaus

== Awards ==
- Berlin International Film Festival FIPRESCI award in panorama (2003)
- Adolf Grimme golden award (2005)
