= 4 Blocks =

German drama series

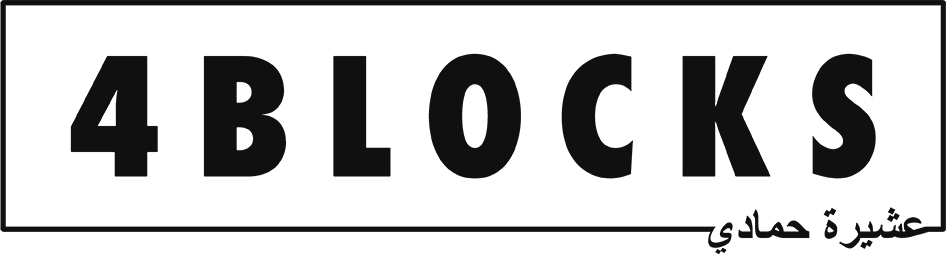
- Genre: Crime drama; Gangster drama
- Written by: Hanno Hackfort; Bob Konrad; Richard Kropf; Marvin Kren
- Directed by: Marvin Kren; Oliver Hirschbiegel
- Starring: Kida Khodr Ramadan; Frederick Lau; Veysel Gelin; Almila Bagriacik; Maryam Zaree; Karolina Lodyga; Massiv; Sami Nasser; Erkan Sulcani; Rauand Taleb; Emilio Sakraya; Ronald Zehrfeld; Oliver Masucci; Ludwig Trepte
- Composers: Stefan Will; Marco Dreckkötter
- Country of origin: Germany
- Original languages: German; Arabic
- No. of seasons: 3
- No. of episodes: 19

Production
- Executive producers: Eva Stadler; Karsten Rühle
- Producers: Quirin Berg; Max Wiedemann; Anke Greifeneder; Hannes Heyelmann
- Running time: 51–59 Minutes
- Production companies: Wiedemann & Berg Television; Turner Germany

Original release
- Network: TNT Serie
- Release: May 8, 2017 – December 12, 2019

4 Blocks is a German drama series. It stars Kida Khodr Ramadan as Ali "Toni" Hamadi, the leader of a drug cartel in Berlin-Neukölln which has strong connections with the Arab crime families including his clan. He is forced to postpone his plans to leave the business to live an ordinary life with his wife, played by Maryam Zaree, when his brother-in-law, played by Massiv, is arrested. He brings in Vince Kerner, played by Frederick Lau, a boyhood friend, to restore order in the family business, much to the dislike of Toni's brother Abbas, played by Veysel, who is eager to succeed him as the family leader.

The first season premiered on German pay television channel TNT Serie on May 8, 2017. A second season premiered on October 11, 2018 and a third in November 2019. Internationally, the series airs on Amazon Prime Video.

4 Blocks has received critical acclaim in Germany and has won multiple domestic awards, including the Grimme-Preis for Ramadan, Gelin, and director Marvin Kren, and six German Television Awards (Deutscher Fernsehpreis), including Best Drama Series, Best Actor for Ramadan, and Best Director for Kren.

== Plot ==
=== Season 1 ===
Lebanese Ali "Toni" Hamady has lived in Germany with his family for 26 years. He is the leader of a family clan living in Berlin-Neukölln that belongs to organised crime. The real boss, his uncle Ibrahim, has largely withdrawn from the business, but still gives the important orders in the background. Toni, however, is dissatisfied with his role and wishes to be able to lead a life without crime with his wife Kalila and daughter Serin. In order to realise this, however, he needs a permanent residence permit, for which he has been waiting for years. He then wants to go into the property business.

After his brother-in-law Latif is arrested with nine kilograms of cocaine in his car, Toni has to react. Under no circumstances does he want to leave control of the Hamady clan to his unpredictable brother Abbas. He has just killed an investigating officer who was on his payroll and whom he blamed for Latif's arrest. Under head of investigation Hagen Kutscha, the police penetrate deeper and deeper into the Hamadys' circles. But it is not only the police who are challenging the Hamadys' core business, the drug trade. The rocker club Cthulhus is also disrupting business and doing everything it can to harm the Hamadys.

In his time of need, Toni meets Vince, an old friend whom he trusts and who stands by his side. However, Toni doesn't realise that Vince is actually an undercover police investigator. The situation becomes even more complicated when Vince meets Latif's wife Amara, for whom he already had a soft spot. While Vince penetrates deeper and deeper into the Hamadys' circle and even gets to know Ibrahim, the rift between Abbas and Toni grows ever wider. When the Cthulhus raid Ibrahim's house following a tip-off from the police, Abbas happens to be there. They leave his uncle badly injured, but Abbas kills the leader of the Hamadys in revenge for a reprimand he has received. However, he makes it look like it was the Cthulhus.

Vince tries to finalise his investigation and pushes for witness protection for him and Amara, who wants to elope with him. However, when Toni finds out that his friend is an undercover agent, he wants to kill him. But Vince manages to overpower him and change his mind. He wants a strong Toni at the head of the Hamadys to prevent an open war, especially as he also realises that a megalomaniac Abbas is not the solution. However, Latif is released because Zeki, a younger clan member, has taken the blame instead of him. This complicates matters, as Latif has since learnt Vince's true identity in prison.

Vince manages to get hold of the gun Abbas used to shoot the policeman and passes it on to his colleagues. Abbas' arrest has already been scheduled and a safe house has been prepared. But just as Vince is about to go into hiding with Amara, he realises that the Cthulhus have kidnapped Toni. Against all reason, he informs Abbas and leads the Hamadys to the Cthulhus' hideout. The showdown in the first season ends with Vince stabbed to death. Abbas is arrested and Toni kills the leader of the Cthulhus, violating his own code of honour ("We don't kill people"). He ends up as the head of the Hamady family.

=== Season 2 ===
The second season takes place a year later. Toni is the undisputed head of the Hamady clan, while Latif runs the street business. Toni travels to Lebanon, where he negotiates with the big bosses. They have been let down by their former partner, Mohammad al-Saafi, and now put Toni in charge of Berlin. In the course of the talks, Omar al-Saafi, Mohammad's nephew, is killed. Toni has now entered the property business and runs an emergency shelter for refugees. He buys a large plot of land on the River Spree, on which he plans to build hotels and other properties in the future, but comes into conflict with the young property shark Matthias Keil. Things are not going well for Toni in his private life either. He is separated from his wife Kalila and rarely sees their daughter. He tries to bring the family back together.

A war with the al-Saafis begins after they burn down the refugee centre with the help of Chechen gangsters. The war puts a heavy strain on the family's business and there are mutual attacks. When Mohammad's brother, who had previously served as a bargaining chip, dies in Lebanese prison, the Hamadys have no means of exerting pressure. Zeki, now free again, has not been able to improve his standing in the clan and continues to be put off. This drives him into the clutches of Mohammad, who recruits him as an informer for his clan. Information from him leads to the murder of Enis Haziri, known as "Potato", who is shot dead by Chechens during a courier trip. This unsettles the base and calls for revenge are heard. However, the clan is still under increased observation by Hagen Kutscha and the police.

Meanwhile, Abbas is sentenced to life imprisonment followed by preventive detention in a trial. The Hamadys demand an appeal, but in the meantime Abbas is being held in Tegel prison, which is under the control of the al-Saafis. Toni, whose dispute with his brother remains unresolved, tries to get him out or at least have him transferred, while Abbas clashes with Frankie, who runs the prison's drug business. The situation escalates when Abbas is attacked and seriously injured by two Chechens in solitary confinement. When he is to be transported to a clinic, however, he manages to escape en route. He arrives at Toni's, who is now planning to transfer him to Lebanon. Toni puts Abbas up in an old warehouse where Ewa can visit him.

Due to dubious payments Toni receives from Lebanon, his bank accounts are frozen. As a result, the contract for the property on the Spree does not materialise after all. Matthias Keil senses his chance and buys the property himself, much to Toni's annoyance. After Toni's attempts to intimidate Keil have no effect, he has Keil's girlfriend shot, which visibly shakes Keil. Keil is furious and in his distress contacts Nico, a former member of the Cthulhus, who still has unfinished business with Toni.

After Toni's daughter Serin is kidnapped, he immediately suspects Mohammad. However, it turns out that Zaur, the leader of the Chechens, has kidnapped Serin. Mohammad is furious that Zaur has kidnapped the girl without his instructions and cuts his neck. He then brings Serin back to her parents unharmed.

Kalila persuades Toni to finally make peace with Mohammad, which they try to do by arranging a forced marriage between Maruf and Djamila, Mohammad's niece. Mohammad also tells Toni that Zeki was the traitor in his ranks. Toni threatens to kill Zeki if he doesn't leave Berlin immediately, which he eventually does.

The uncle of the murdered Zaur wants revenge on Mohammad, but Mohammad convinces him that Toni was responsible for the murder and promises to hand Toni and his family over to him. Mohammad plans to murder Toni and his family at his niece's wedding. However, Djamila gets wind of this and manages to tell Kalila about the murder plans, whereupon Toni executes Mohammad.

Now that everything seems to be settled, Toni, Kalila and Serin pack their bags for their long-awaited holiday. Nico, hired by Keil to murder Toni, suddenly appears in the garden. He shoots, but Toni bends down at that moment and the bullet hits Kalila in the chest. Toni is then hit by a second shot, but the bullet only grazes his neck. Kemal manages to save Toni from further shots and pursues the fleeing Nico while Kalila collapses.

=== Season 3 ===
Season 3 picks up immediately after the end of the second season. Kalila is taken to hospital, where Toni and Serin hope that she will survive her gunshot wound. Meanwhile, his people are feverishly searching for the shooter. They finally manage to catch him. Toni leaves the hospital and kills him as he sleeps in a kind of comatose state. When he returns, his wife has died. This becomes a turning point for Toni. He still chases Keil and has him brought to a mock execution, but spares him.

A year later, Toni has largely withdrawn from the drug business and is volunteering to coach a football team in Neukölln made up of refugees. He is also fighting for custody of his daughter Serin, who lives with her grandmother. Abbas is now head of the clan, while Latif takes care of the day-to-day business. But Toni is drawn back into the clan business. Karami, the boss from Lebanon, sends men to Toni to ask him to return the embezzled drug money and find the person responsible for this embezzlement. A desperate search for the traitor begins. Even Kemal, who has always been considered loyal, comes under suspicion. In the meantime, Abbas is planning the coup of his life: a diamond heist at the airport.

But new problems are on the horizon: Zeki is back and has built up an excellent reputation in Frankfurt. Despite the ban on returning to Berlin, he now wants to expand his business into the Berlin drugs market. To this end, he makes contact with the Russians. Together with the unreliable Pascal, he has to commit a murder to prove his loyalty. Eventually he manages to get his old mate Maruf on his side. He provides him with drug contacts, mainly to get in touch with his old girlfriend, and betrays his uncle in the process.

The Berlin State Office of Criminal Investigation, with Alexandra Winter as the new head of the clan crime department, is also hot on the Hamadys' heels. Fuelled by anonymous information from Zeki and a bugging operation in Abbas' house, Winter begins to increase the pressure on everyone involved. The officers also blackmail Latif's wife Amara, who is hiding from her vengeful husband. She returns to Berlin to sort things out with her husband. When an initial discussion fails, she turns to Toni.

Meanwhile, the coup takes place at the airport. The LKA has received another tip from Zeki. But Winter wants the big fish, and instead of foiling the robbery, she lets herself be fooled by Abbas and only finds the empty suitcase. When Abbas tries to kill Kemal, Toni is able to resolve the situation, but misses an important appointment to visit his daughter. He now has to make a decision and wants to sort out the clan business first.

Meanwhile, Karami increases the pressure on Toni and has Latif shot just as he is about to reconcile with his wife for the sake of the children. He dies in Amara's arms. After a long search, they finally find the traitor. It is Ewa, Abbas' impulsive wife, who is behind the embezzlement. Abbas confronts her after a visit to the gynaecologist and accidentally kills her and her unborn child. Toni tries to appease Karami with a picture of the dead Ewa and they apparently sever their business ties.

But shortly afterwards, when Toni receives another visit, they attack Toni in his car. He is only just able to get himself and his daughter to safety. Finally, they set a trap for Karami on seemingly neutral territory and kill him and his henchmen. The LKA was in on it again, but was tricked by Karami during their surveillance.

Meanwhile, the situation escalates with Zeki, who is caught by the Hamadys after a tip-off from Keil. Maruf, who has broken up with Zeki, is finally ordered to kill his old mate and shoots him under duress. Winter now puts all her eggs in one basket. She knows that Abbas and Toni will have to flee after the coup against Karami and turn the diamonds into money first. While the police unearth various hideouts of the Hamadys and presumably save the life of the seriously injured Zeki, Winter concentrates on the suspected diamond dealer. There, the LKA officers actually come across Abbas. In a hopeless situation, the surrounded Abbas fires two shots at the police, who then shoot him dead. Toni manages to escape and hides in his house in the country, which he wanted to renovate for Serin. Shortly afterwards, several limousines arrive; his fate remains uncertain.

While Winter savours her victory alone with rare champagne, the final scene shows Maruf sitting down at Latif's desk.

== Cast ==
- Kida Khodr Ramadan as Ali "Toni" Hamadi, the former leader of the Hamadi crime family. After planning to leave in order to live an ordinary life with his wife, he is forced back into business in order to protect his family.
- Frederick Lau as Vince Kerner, a boyhood friend of Toni and former member of the Southeast Warriors, who returns to Berlin after many years to assist him in restoring order in the family business.
- Veysel Gelin as Abbas Hamadi, Ali's younger brother and the designated new leader of his family's business.
- Almila Bagriacik as Amara Hamadi, Latif's wife and the sister of Ali and Abbas.
- Maryam Zaree as Kalila Hamadi, Ali's wife. She pushes Ali to leave the criminal activities of his family behind to start a legal life and obtain German citizenship.
- Karolina Lodyga as Ewa Niziol, Abbas's wife and the only non-Arab member of the Hamadi Family. She enjoys little respect within the family and pushes Abbas to strengthen his position against Ali.
- Massiv as Latif Hamadi, Amara's husband. He and Abbas organize the family's drug business through his car repair shop.
- Sami Nasser as Jemal Hamadi, a former member of the Southeast Warriors and one of the closest confidants of Ali and Abbas. He is responsible for the smaller crime businesses of the family.
- Erkan Sulcani as Ahmed "Kartoffel" Hamadi, part of the inner circle of the clan, who acts as one of the enforcers of the family.
- Rauand Taleb as Zeki, Issam's best friend and one of the Hamadi family's drug runners. He dreams of working his way up in the family's business.
- Emilio Sakraya as Issam, Zeki's best friend and one of the Hamadi family's drug runners. He is the more deliberate of the two, but Zeki often convinces him to actions which get him into trouble.
- Ronald Zehrfeld as Rainer "Ruffi" Ruff, the president of the Cthuhlu MC, a biker club funded by drug trafficking and prostitution. In the light of the Hamadi family's supply difficulties, he tries to take over their territories in Berlin-Neukölln.
- Oliver Masucci as Hagen Kutscha, leader of the police's investigations of the Hamadi family.
- Ludwig Trepte as Nico, the Cthuhlu's drug runner. He tries to lure dealers away from the Hamadi, which causes conflict between him and Zeki and Issam.
- Mousa Suleiman as Halim Karami, Boss of the Karami Clan, one of the most powerful clans that controls Beirut and wants to control Berlin via the Arab crime families of Germany.

== Production ==
The first episode of the series was shot in July 2016 in Berlin. Locations in the Neukölln and Kreuzberg boroughs were used including the Sonnenallee, the Kottbusser Tor subway station and Görlitzer Park. The budget for the first season was four million euros, including €250,000 they received from the Medienboard Berlin-Brandenburg.

== Release ==
The first two episodes of the series were shown on 15 February 2017 at the Berlin International Film Festival. The complete first season was broadcast weekly for six weeks from May to June 2017 on TNT Serie. It also aired on free-to-air channel ZDFneo in November 2018.

Amazon secured international broadcasting rights in more than 150 countries, with the first season added on Amazon Prime on October 5, 2017 and season 2 on December 15, 2018. In Summer 2018, it was released in 50 additional countries including Germany, France and Russia.

== Episodes ==
=== Season 1 (2017) ===
No. overall	No. in season	Title	Directed by	Original release date
1	1	"Brothers" "Brüder"	Marvin Kren	May 8, 2017
2	2	"False Nine" "Die falsche Neun"	Marvin Kren	May 15, 2017
3	3	"Ibrahim"	Marvin Kren	May 22, 2017
4	4	"Betrayal" "Verrat"	Marvin Kren	May 29, 2017
5	5	"Powerless" "Machtlos"	Marvin Kren	June 5, 2017
6	6	"Dead Man Walking"	Marvin Kren	June 12, 2017

=== Season 2 (2018) ===
No. overall	No. in season	Title	Directed by	Original release date
7	1	"Fire" "Feuer"	Oliver Hirschbiegel	October 11, 2018
8	2	"Sheep and Lions" "Schafe und Löwen"	Oliver Hirschbiegel	October 18, 2018
9	3	"Blood" "Blut"	Oliver Hirschbiegel	October 25, 2018
10	4	"Free" "Frei"	Özgür Yıldırım	November 1, 2018
11	5	"Peace" "Frieden"	Özgür Yıldırım	November 8, 2018
12	6	"Reparation" "Wiedergutmachung"	Özgür Yıldırım	November 15, 2018
13	7	"Winning and losing" "Gewinnen und verlieren"	Özgür Yıldırım	November 22, 2018

=== Season 3 (2019) ===
No. overall	No. in season	Title	Directed by	Original release date
14	1	"Ali"	Özgür Yıldırım	November 7, 2019
15	2	"The Path of Money" "Der Weg des Geldes"	Özgür Yıldırım	November 14, 2019
16	3	"Familiar enemy" "Vertrauter Feind"	Özgür Yıldırım	November 21, 2019
17	4	"Diamonds" "Diamanten"	Özgür Yıldırım	November 28, 2019
18	5	"Pact with the Devil" "Der Pakt mit dem Teufel"	Özgür Yıldırım	December 5, 2019
19	6	"Brothers for Ever" "Brüder für immer"	Özgür Yıldırım	December 12, 2019

== See also ==
- List of German television series
