= Phoenix (2014 film) =

2014 German melodrama war film

- Theatrical release poster
- Directed by: Christian Petzold
- Screenplay by: Christian Petzold; Harun Farocki
- Based on: The Return from the Ashes by Hubert Monteilhet
- Produced by: Florian Koerner von Gustorf; Michael Weber
- Starring: Nina Hoss; Ronald Zehrfeld; Nina Kunzendorf; Michael Maertens; Imogen Kogge; Kirsten Block
- Cinematography: Hans Fromm
- Edited by: Bettina Böhler
- Music by: Stefan Will
- Release dates: 25 September 2014 (Germany); 24 July 2015 (United States)
- Running time: 100 minutes
- Country: Germany
- Languages: German; English
- Box office: $5.6 million

Phoenix is a 2014 German melodrama war film directed by Christian Petzold. Loosely adapted from the 1961 novel Le Retour des Cendres (English: The Return from the Ashes) by French author Hubert Monteilhet, the film stars Nina Hoss and Ronald Zehrfeld as Nelly and Johnny Lenz, respectively.

Phoenix is set in Germany in the aftermath of World War II, where Nelly, a Jewish woman who managed to survive Auschwitz concentration camp, decides to go back to her husband Johnny in Berlin. She has had to have her face reconstructed owing to a bullet wound, and her husband does not recognize her. The film marks the sixth collaboration between Petzold and Hoss, as well as being the second film in which Hoss and Zehrfeld star opposite each other, after Barbara (2012), also directed by Petzold.

Phoenix was released in Germany on 25 September 2014, and in the United States on 24 July 2015. The film received widespread critical acclaim, with praise for the film's suspenseful narrative, for its direction, for Hoss's performance, and for its production design and symbolic ambiguous elements. The film was released on Blu-ray and DVD in North America by The Criterion Collection on 26 April 2016. It has been widely assessed as one of the best movies of the 2010s.

== Plot ==
Following the end of World War II, Holocaust survivor and former cabaret singer Nelly Lenz returns to Berlin with damage caused by a bullet wound. Her friend Lene takes Nelly to a reconstructive plastic surgeon. Although Nelly tells the surgeon that she would like to look exactly as she used to, he is unable to recreate her old face completely, and Nelly is disappointed with the final result.

Lene finds an apartment for her and Nelly. Since Nelly's family members all died during the war, Nelly has inherited a considerable amount of money. Lene suggests to Nelly that she collect the money and that the two of them travel to Palestine. She believes they will be safe there and can help with the creation of an independent Jewish state.

Although Lene warns Nelly that her husband Johnny may have been the one to betray her to the Nazis, Nelly denies this possibility. She leaves the apartment at night to find him. She finds Johnny working in a nightclub called Phoenix. Johnny fails to recognize her, yet says later that she bears an uncanny resemblance to his late wife, Nelly. In order to obtain his wife's inheritance, he asks Nelly to impersonate his wife.

Johnny slowly transforms Nelly into an image and performer of her previous self before her arrest. Nelly goes along with Johnny's plan and keeps her true identity concealed, telling Johnny that her name is Esther. Although Lene continues to warn Nelly that Johnny was possibly complicit in her arrest, Nelly maintains a romantic view of the relationship. As Esther, she questions Johnny about his feelings for his wife and his behavior at the time of her arrest. Johnny avoids answering most of Nelly's questions, wanting her to concentrate on learning to impersonate his wife. Johnny tells Nelly that he plans to stage her "return" from the camps within the week, and invites several of the couple's old friends to meet her with him at the train station.

After spending several days with Johnny, Nelly returns to the apartment she shares with Lene. Here, the landlady informs her that Lene has killed herself, leaving behind a note for Nelly. In this note, Lene admits to Nelly that she knows that Johnny divorced Nelly the day before her arrest. She includes a copy of the divorce decree, which forces Nelly to accept Johnny's betrayal.

Nelly keeps this knowledge a secret, meeting Johnny and their old friends at the train station as planned. Later, at the home of one of her friends, Nelly invites the group to listen to her sing, accompanied by Johnny on piano. As Nelly sings, Johnny recognizes her voice and sees the identification number tattooed on her arm when she was a prisoner in the concentration camps. He stops playing the piano and shows strong feelings of guilt while Nelly finishes the song and walks away.

== Cast ==
- Nina Hoss as Nelly Lenz
- Ronald Zehrfeld as Johannes "Johnny" Lenz
- Nina Kunzendorf as Lene Winter
- Michael Maertens as Arzt
- Imogen Kogge as Elisabeth
- Felix Römer as Geiger

== Production ==
=== Deviations from source novel ===
The film's screenplay is loosely based on Hubert Monteilhet's 1961 French detective novel Le Retour des cendres (English: The Return from the Ashes), which set the story in France. The novel was freely adapted into the 1965 J. Lee Thompson film Return from the Ashes.

In his adaptation, Christian Petzold decided to change the setting to Berlin shortly after the German surrender at the end of World War II. The screenplay was co-written by Petzold and the artist Harun Farocki. It was the last screenplay of Farocki's career.

In the process, the scenarists changed the characters' names and occupations. They eliminated the book's narrative device, in which the survivor's daughter Fabienne discovers the story of her mother's and stepfather/lover's relationship through journal entries written by her mother. She is revealed to have died under suspicious circumstances. They also dropped a secondary plot in which Fabienne has developed a relationship with her stepfather, and thus challenges her mother for his affection when identities are ambiguous.

== Soundtrack ==
The film features the Kurt Weill/Ogden Nash song "Speak Low" (1943), and Cole Porter's "Night and Day".

== Release ==
Phoenix was released on Blu-ray and DVD in Germany by Indigo on 27 March 2015.

In the United Kingdom, the film was released on Blu-ray and DVD by Soda Pictures on 31 August 2015, with the Blu-ray including a 21-minute "making-of" featurette and the film's trailer.

On 26 April 2016, the film was released by The Criterion Collection for Region 1 on Blu-ray and DVD using a 2K digital master. Both include a conversation between director Christian Petzold and actress Nina Hoss, a new interview with the film's cinematographer Hans Fromm, and a documentary featuring interviews with the cast and crew from 2013, as well as the film's original trailer, and a new English subtitle translation. Exclusive to the Blu-ray is 5.1 surround DTS-HD Master Audio soundtrack for the film. The new Blu-ray and DVD cover is made by Nessim Higson.

== Reception ==
=== Box office ===
Phoenix was given a limited release in two theaters under Sundance Selects on 24 July 2015, where it grossed $28,210 during the weekend. As of 30 October 2015 the film has earned a gross of $3,143,677 in North America, making it one of the highest-grossing German films in the United States in recent years. Audiences surveyed by CinemaScore gave the film an average grade of "A–" on an A+ to F scale.

=== Critical response ===
Phoenix received acclaim from critics. The review aggregator website Rotten Tomatoes reported a 98% approval rating with an average rating of 8.1/10 based on 121 reviews. The website's critical consensus reads: "Tense, complex, and drenched in atmosphere, Phoenix is a well-acted, smartly crafted war drama that finds writer-director Christian Petzold working at peak power." On Metacritic, the film has a weighted average score of 89 out of 100, based on 30 reviews from mainstream critics, indicating "universal acclaim".

The A.V. Club's A.A. Dowd described Phoenix as a "noir psychodrama for the ages", and Nina Hoss as "an actress of old-school glamour and modern nuance". He wrote: "Petzold has made an expertly tuned genre piece, one whose pulpiness—guns, face changes, a danger-laced nightlife—doesn't conflict with its more serious aims, and whose deep real-world resonance doesn't compromise its dramatic economy. No scene is unnecessary. No shot is wasted." At the end of 2019, Phoenix was ranked No. 26 on The A.V. Club's list of 100 best films of the 2010s, and was No. 6 on Time's top 10 films of the decade compiled by Stephanie Zacharek.

The National Board of Review named Phoenix as one of the Top 5 Foreign Language Films of 2015.
