= Lars Kraume =

German film director (born 1973)

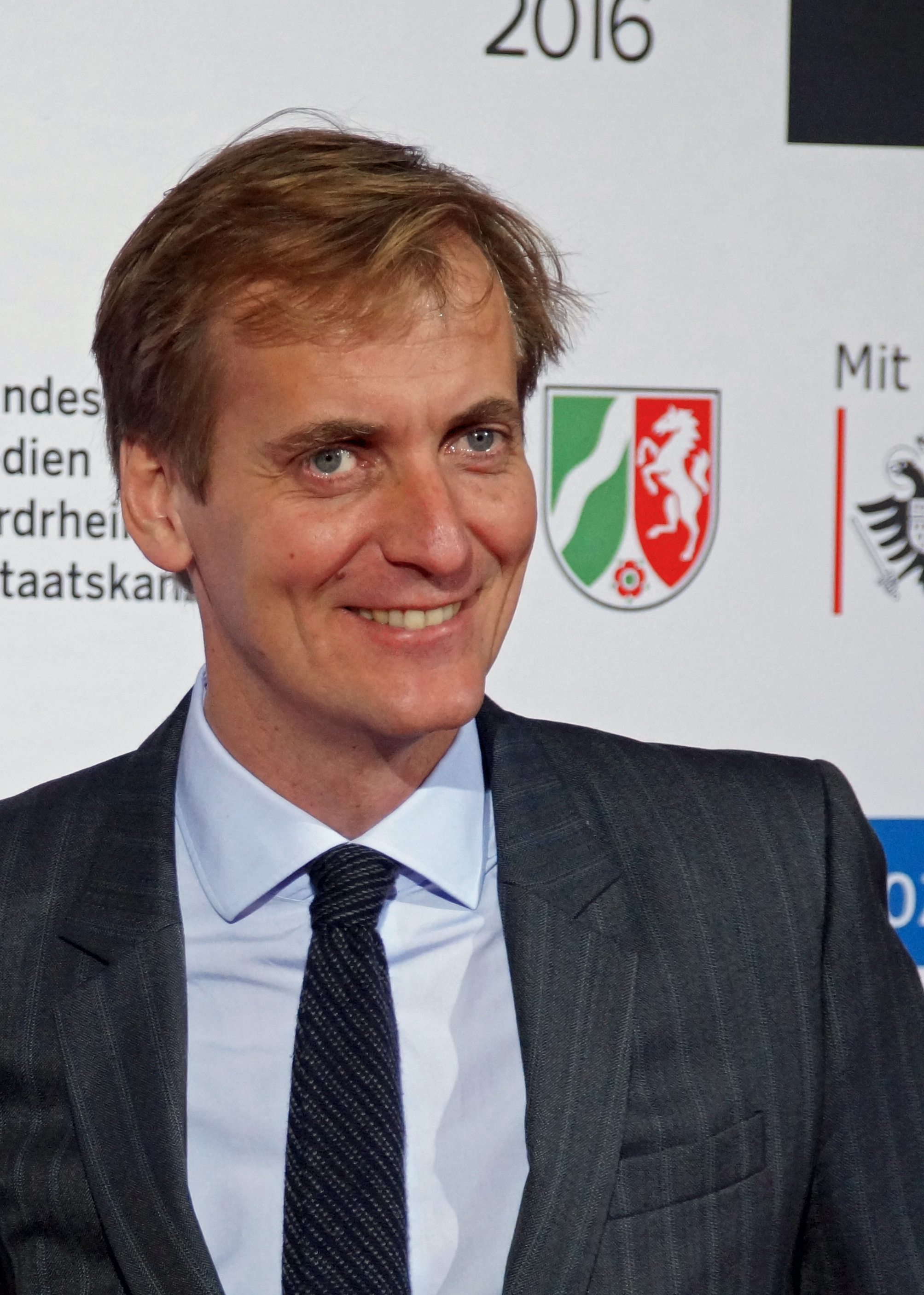
- Born: 24 February 1973 (age 53); Chieti, Italy
- Occupations: Film director, screenwriter, producer
- Years active: 1996-present

Lars Kraume (born 24 February 1973) is an Italian-born German film director, screenwriter and producer. He has directed 35 films since 1996.

== Biography ==
Born in Abruzzo, Italy, to German parents.

== Career ==
Kraume has directed numerous television productions, including several episodes of the crime series Tatort and his own crime mini-series Dengler. His feature film The People vs. Fritz Bauer was nominated for nine German Film Awards, winning in the categories of best film, best director, best screenplay, best supporting actor, best costume design and best production design. Lars Kraume's next film, The Silent Revolution, is based on the true story about a group of DDR youth whose protest in solidarity with the Hungarian Revolution of 1956 became global news after they were interrogated and denounced by the East German government. It was distributed by StudioCanal in 2018.

Kraume has directed some of Germany's most celebrated actors and actresses, including Martina Gedeck, Lars Eidinger, Florian Lukas, Burghart Klaußner, Ronald Zehrfeld as well as Wolfgang Büttner's last performance for Kraume's directing debut Dunkel.

== Selected filmography ==
Year	Title	Director	Writer
2001	Viktor Vogel – Commercial Man	Yes	No
2005	No Songs of Love	Yes	No
2010	The Coming Days	Yes	No
2013	My Sisters	Yes	No
2015	The People vs. Fritz Bauer	Yes	Yes
2018	The Silent Revolution	Yes	Yes
2023	Measures of Men	Yes	Yes
2023	The Uncertainty Principle of Love	Yes	No

TV film

- Dunckel (1998)
- The Verdict (2016)
