= Stephanie Zacharek =

American film critic

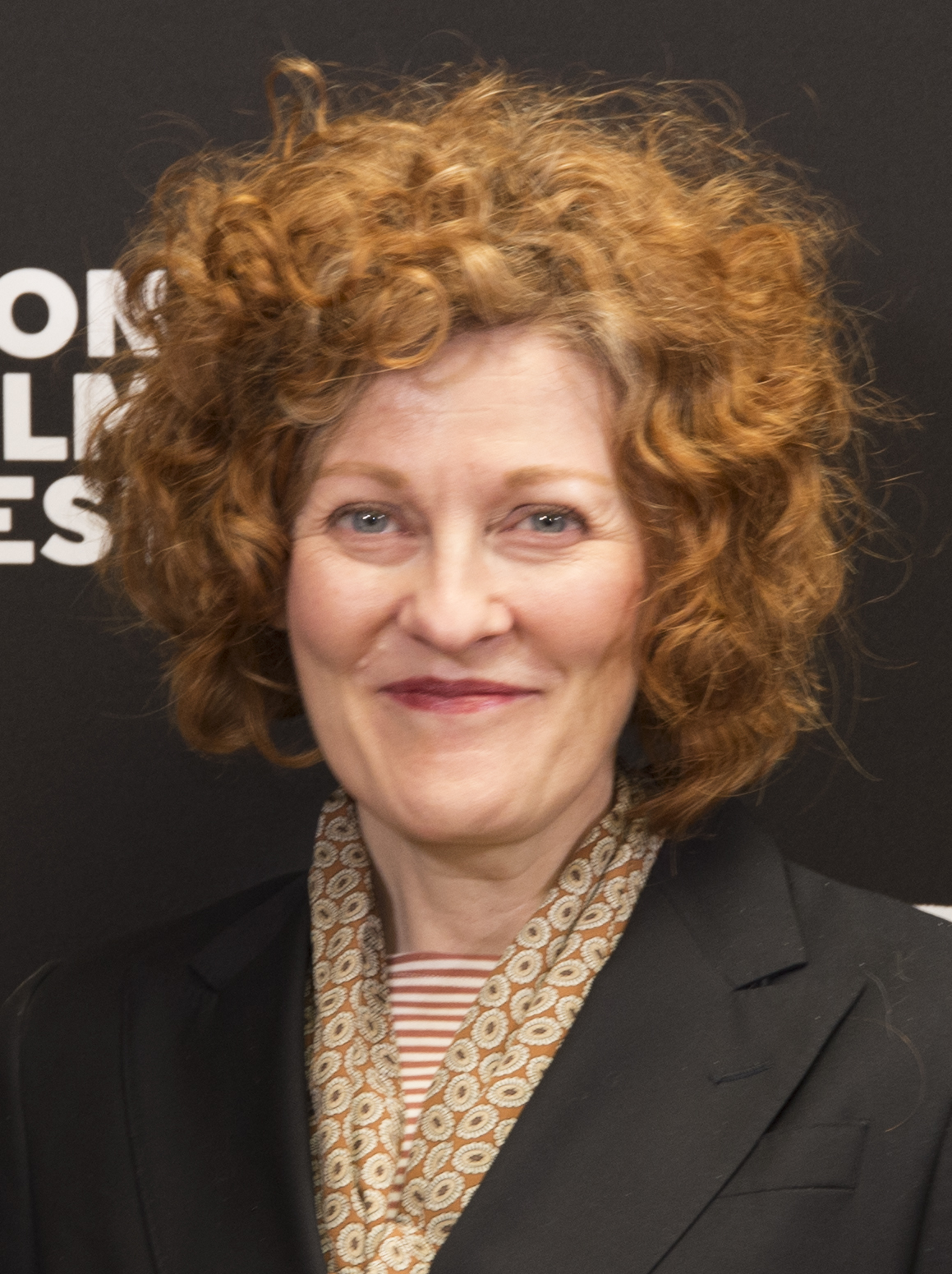
- Zacharek in 2018
- Education: Syracuse University (BS)
- Occupations: Film critic, journalist
- Years active: 1986–present
- Spouse: Charles Taylor (divorced)

Stephanie Zacharek is an American film critic at Time, based in New York City. From 2013 to 2015, she was the principal film critic for The Village Voice. She was a 2015 Pulitzer Prize finalist in criticism. In February 2018, she was invited to serve as a judge for the main competition unit of the 68th Berlin International Film Festival.

== Early life ==
Stephanie Zacharek received a Bachelor of Science degree from the S.I. Newhouse School of Public Communications at Syracuse University, in New York.

== Career ==
Zacharek contributed articles to Rolling Stone Magazine, Entertainment Weekly, Interview, The Village Voice and The Boston Phoenix. For 9 years, she was a copy editor at Inc.. From 1999 to 2010, she was a film critic and senior writer at Salon.com, where her husband, Charles Taylor, was also a film critic until 2005. She became chief film critic of Movieline in 2010, and left in mid-2012. In April 2013, the Voice Media Group hired her as chief film critic of The Village Voice. In 2015 she left the Village Voice and became the film critic for Time magazine. In February 2018, she was selected to be on the jury for the main competition section of the 68th Berlin International Film Festival.

== Personal life ==
Zacharek was married to film critic Charles Taylor, but they are now divorced. Zacharek tried to have children when she was younger, but never got pregnant. However, today she has "zero regrets" about not having children. As of 1999, she lives in New York.

== Preferences ==
When she participated in the 2012 Sight & Sound critics' poll, Zacharek listed her ten favorite films as follows: Breathless, Carlito's Way, The Godfather, The Godfather: Part II, The Lady Eve, Once Upon a Time in the West, The Rules of the Game, Sunrise, Touch of Evil, and The World of Apu. She has also cited Holiday as a personal favorite.

=== Best films of the year ===
Year	#1	#2	#3	#4	#5	#6	#7	#8	#9	#10
1999	Three Kings	All About My Mother	The Insider	American Pie	Besieged	South Park: Bigger, Longer & Uncut and Dick	Romance	The Limey	Run Lola Run	The Straight Story
2000	Hamlet	Almost Famous	Quills	Yi Yi	The Virgin Suicides	Set Me Free	O Brother, Where Art Thou?	Jesus' Son	The Original Kings of Comedy	Love and Sex
2001	Mulholland Drive	The Lord of the Rings: The Fellowship of the Ring	Moulin Rouge!	Together	Sexy Beast	The Gleaners & I	In the Mood for Love	Charlotte Gray	Born Romantic	Donnie Darko
2002	Y Tu Mamá También	Far from Heaven	About a Boy	Secretary	Femme Fatale	Chicago	The Pianist	Morvern Callar	Possession	CQ
2003	Lost in Translation	In America	A Mighty Wind	Spellbound	American Splendor	The Lord of the Rings: The Return of the King	Master and Commander: The Far Side of the World	To Be and To Have	School of Rock	Masked and Anonymous
2004	Before Sunset	House of Flying Daggers	Hotel Rwanda	Last Life in the Universe	I'll Sleep When I'm Dead	Harry Potter and the Prisoner of Azkaban	The Incredibles and The SpongeBob SquarePants Movie	Hellboy	The Aviator	Harold & Kumar Go to White Castle
2005	Kings and Queen	The Best of Youth	Pride & Prejudice	Oldboy	Tropical Malady	The Beat That My Heart Skipped	Breakfast on Pluto	The Skeleton Key and Land of the Dead	Wallace & Gromit: The Curse of the Were-Rabbit and Corpse Bride	King Kong
2006	Army of Shadows	Days of Glory	Casino Royale	Pan's Labyrinth	The Queen and Marie Antoinette	Dave Chappelle's Block Party and Dixie Chicks: Shut Up and Sing	Idlewild	The Painted Veil	The Notorious Bettie Page	A Prairie Home Companion
2007	I'm Not There	Control	The Diving Bell and the Butterfly	Persepolis	Away from Her	Ratatouille	Planet Terror and Death Proof	Once	Joe Strummer: The Future Is Unwritten	No End in Sight and Redacted
2008	Happy-Go-Lucky	A Christmas Tale	Ghost Town	Cadillac Records	The Class	The Visitor	Before I Forget	Trouble the Water	Sparrow	Iron Man and Hellboy II: The Golden Army
2009	Summer Hours	Fantastic Mr. Fox	Antichrist	The September Issue and Valentino: The Last Emperor	Bright Star	Coraline	The International	Lake Tahoe	Broken Embraces	Star Trek
2010	Somewhere	The Ghost Writer	The Social Network	The King's Speech	I Am Love	Despicable Me and My Dog Tulip	Vincere	Carlos	Vengeance	The American and The Tourist
2011	The Artist	Melancholia	Tinker Tailor Soldier Spy	Midnight in Paris	Jane Eyre	Le Havre	Bill Cunningham New York	Pina	Cave of Forgotten Dreams	Drive
2012	Holy Motors	Zero Dark Thirty	Barbara	Django Unchained	Rust and Bone	Skyfall	This Is Not a Film	Oslo, August 31st	Premium Rush	Hit and Run and Haywire
2013	Gravity	Blue Is the Warmest Color	Inside Llewyn Davis	Much Ado About Nothing	Frances Ha	The To Do List	Before Midnight	Stories We Tell	20 Feet from Stardom	Despicable Me 2
2014	Under the Skin	Boyhood	Only Lovers Left Alive	Mr. Turner	The Immigrant	Revenge of the Mekons, Pulp: A Film About Life, Death & Supermarkets, and 20,000 Days on Earth	Love Is Strange	The Missing Picture	John Wick	Top Five
2015	Spotlight	Phoenix	I'll See You in My Dreams	Clouds of Sils Maria	Iris	Mustang	Tangerine	Creed	The Man from U.N.C.L.E.	Ex Machina
2016	Moonlight	Paterson	Loving	Elle	Silence	Manchester by the Sea	Tower	La La Land	Everybody Wants Some!!	The Shallows
2017	The Post	Lady Bird	The Lost City of Z	Personal Shopper	Kedi	Call Me By Your Name	Dunkirk	Faces Places	Get Out	Girls Trip
2018	Roma	Won't You Be My Neighbor?	First Reformed	Eighth Grade	The Favourite	Can You Ever Forgive Me?	A Star Is Born	If Beale Street Could Talk	Bohemian Rhapsody	Paddington 2
2019	Pain and Glory	The Irishman	Once Upon a Time in Hollywood	Marriage Story	Little Women	Parasite	Knives Out	Dolemite Is My Name	A Beautiful Day in the Neighborhood	Hustlers
2020	First Cow	Collective	The Trial of the Chicago 7	David Byrne's American Utopia	Small Axe: Lovers Rock	Emma	Wolfwalkers	Nomadland	Miss Juneteenth	Bill & Ted Face the Music
2021	The Power of the Dog	The Worst Person in the World	Summer of Soul	The Souvenir: Part II	Parallel Mothers	Passing	The Disciple	C'mon C'mon	The Tragedy of Macbeth	Drive My Car
2022	The Fabelmans	Aftersun	Armageddon Time	Elvis	Happening	Tár	EO	Il Buco	The Inspection	All the Beauty and the Bloodshed
2023	Fallen Leaves	Maestro	The Zone of Interest	Priscilla	Revoir Paris	Past Lives	Killers of the Flower Moon	Are You There, God? It's Me, Margaret.	Dreamin' Wild	Passages
2024	Babygirl	All We Imagine as Light	The Seed of the Sacred Fig	Anora	A Complete Unknown	Hard Truths	Green Border	Emilia Pérez	Flow	DogMan
2025	Nouvelle Vague	An Officer and a Spy	Blue Moon	Sentimental Value	Peter Hujar's Day	Roofman	Sinners	The Mastermind	Kill the Jockey	One of Them Days
