= Almila Bagriacik =

Turkish-German actress (born 1990)

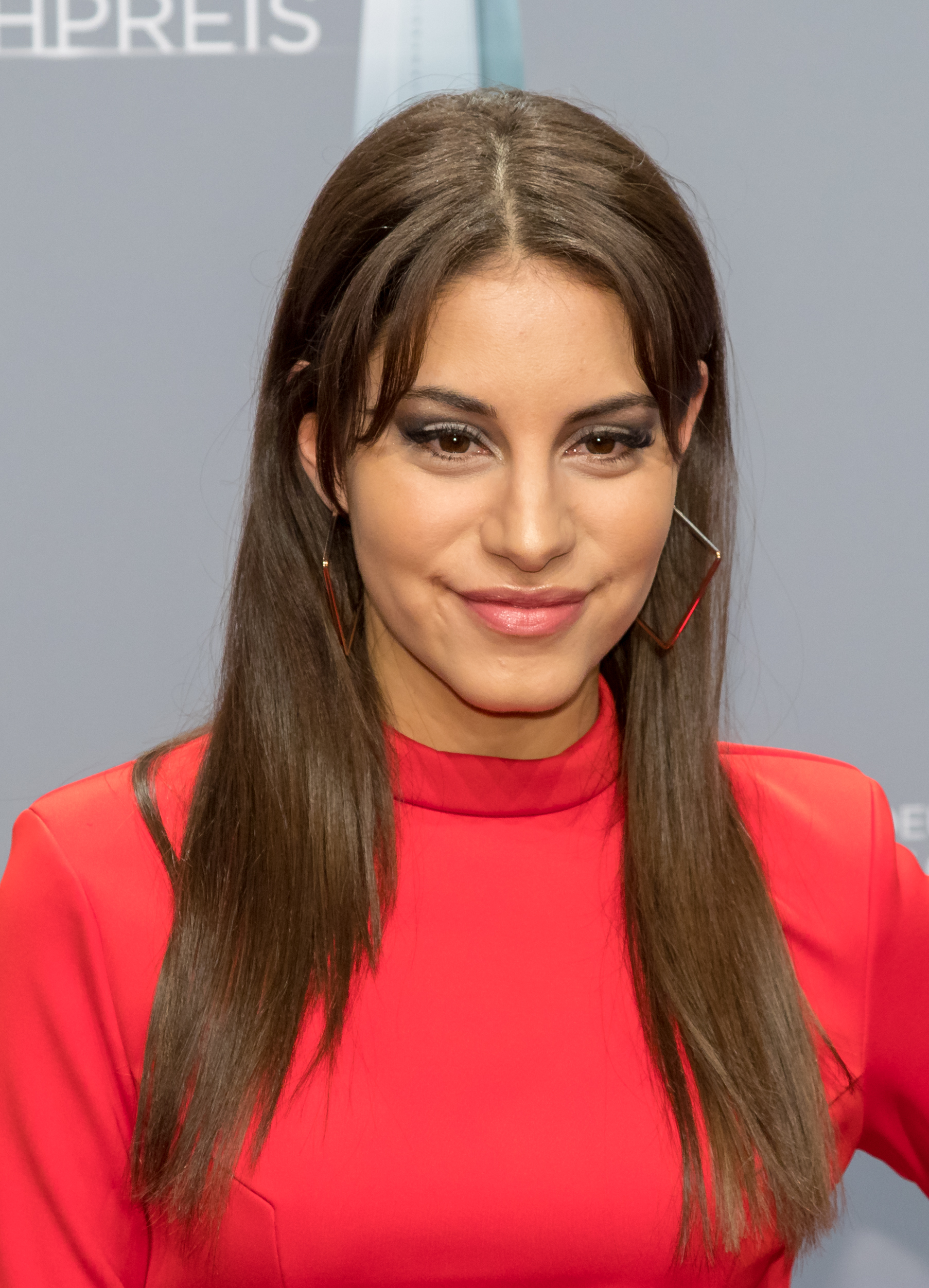
- Bagriacik in 2018
- Born: 10 July 1990 (age 36); Ankara, Turkey
- Occupation: Actress
- Years active: 2010–present

Almila Bagriacik (born 10 July 1990) is a Turkish-German actress. She has performed in German film and television.

== Life and career ==
Bagriacik was born in 1990 in Ankara. Her parents, who were correspondents for the Turkish media, moved to Berlin in 1995, where she grew up speaking both German and Turkish. She was discovered, by chance, by a photographer in 2008, at a club in Kreuzberg in Berlin, who invited her to an audition. She won a role in the drama When We Leave, directed by Feo Aladag, which premiered in 2010 at the Berlin International Film Festival.

Bagriacik subsequently played leading roles in numerous television series, such as Der Kriminalist, Notruf Hafenkante, Der Lehrer, Großstadtrevier and The Old Fox. Between 2008 and 2010, Bagriacik played the lead on stage in Ein Warngedicht at the Hebbel am Ufer theater in Berlin.

Bagriacik played her first major leading role in the feature film Hördur, released in Germany in October 2015. The German film rating authority Deutsche Film- und Medienbewertung (FBW) distinguished the film as "Especially worthwhile", the higher of two quality certification levels issued by the FBW. One of the reasons for the jury's decision was, among other things: "The casting of young Almila Bagriacik in the role of [the film's protagonist] Aylin can be described as a stroke of luck." The Verband der deutschen Filmkritik nominated Bagriacik for best actress in 2015 for her performance in Hördur.

In the ARD television series Detective Pasha, Bagriacik took on the leading role of the investigator Jale Cengiz in 2015. The two films, Kommissar Pascha (Detective

In the award-winning TNT mini-series 4 Blocks (including the German Television Award in 3 categories, the German Academy of Television Prize in 6 categories, the Grimme Prize 2017 and Goldene Kamera 2017 as "Best Series"), Bagriacik plays the leading female role Amara alongside Frederick Lau, rapper Veysel, and Kida Khodr Ramadan. TNT Series started broadcasting the first 6 episodes of this self-produced series on 8 May 2017. The first two episodes were presented at the Berlinale 2017. The free TV premiere started on ZDFneo on 28 November 2017. In 2018 the shooting finished on a second season, which will be broadcast on the TNT Serie channel from 11 October 2018.

From the end of 2015 to 2017, Bagriacik played Filiz in the successful Turkish series Hayat Şarkisi (Song of Life) in a continuous role. Since mid-2017 she has appeared in the Kiel episodes of Tatort (Scene of the crime) as Commissioner Mila Sahin alongside Axel Milberg. Further completed projects include leading roles in the ZDF productions Nachtschicht – Es lebe der Tod (2017) and Der gute Bulle: Friss oder stirb (2018), both directed by Lars Becker, and the ARD TV - Event-Zweiteiler Unschuldig (2018, director: Nicolai Rohde). Bagriacik also appeared as the leading actress Nile in the world premiere Träum weiter (Dream on) (director: Selen Kara, author Nesrin Samdereli) at the Schauspielhaus Bochum during the 2017/2018 season.

Bagriacik has her main residence in Berlin.

== Filmography (selection) ==
- 2010: When We Leave
- 2010: Countdown – Die Jagd beginnt (TV series; Episode: Blutsbande)
- 2011: GhettoLoveGrief (short film)
- 2012: Glanz & Gloria
- 2013: Tatort: Wer das Schweigen bricht
- 2013: 300 Worte Deutsch, director: Züli Aladag
- 2013: Notruf Hafenkante (TV Series, Lead, Episode: Gelegenheit macht Diebe)
- 2013: Der Lehrer (TV Series; Lead, Episode: Elektroschocker, Pfefferspray und SEK vor der Tür)
- 2014: Großstadtrevier (TV Series, Lead, Episode: Auf den Barrikaden)
- 2010–2014: Der Kriminalist (TV crime series: 2 Episodes)
- 2014: Alarm für Cobra 11 – Die Autobahnpolizei (TV series; Episode: 1983)
- 2012–2014: Leipzig Homicide (TV crime series; 2 Episodes)
- 2014: Hördur, Feature Film, Lead, Director: Ekrem Ergün
- 2015: Unter Verdacht – Verlorene Sicherheit, Director: Andreas Herzog
- 2015: The Old Fox – Tödliche Ideale, TV Series, Lead, Director: Matthias Kiefersauer
- 2016: Kommissar Pascha, TV Movie, Lead, Director: Sascha Bigler
- 2016: Die Opfer – Vergesst mich nicht, Lead, director: Züli Aladag (Three-part film project NSU German History X)
- 2016: Hayat Şarkısı, TV Series, Lead, Director: Cem Karci, Kanal D
- 2017: Bierleichen, TV Movie, Lead, Director: Matthias Steurer
- 2017: 4 Blocks, Season 1, TV Series, Lead, Director: Marvin Kren, TNT Serie
- 2017: Kommissarin Lucas, Director: Ralf Huettner
- 2017: Tatort - Borowski und das Haus der Geister, TV Movie, Lead, Director: Elmar Fischer
- 2017: Nachtschicht – Es lebe der Tod, TV Movie, Lead, Director: Lars Becker
- 2018: 4 Blocks, Season 2, TV Series, TNT Serie, Lead, Director: Oliver Hirschbiegel, Özgür Yildirim
- 2018: Tatort - Borowski und das Glück der Anderen, TV Movie, Lead, Director: Andreas Kleinert
- 2018: Der gute Bulle: Friss oder stirb, TV Movie, Lead, Director: Lars Becker
- 2018: Unschuldig, TV Movie (multi-part), Lead, Director: Nicolai Rohde
- 2019: A Regular Woman
- 2020: Nimby
- 2021: Dangerous Truth
- 2022–Present: The Empress

== Awards (selection) ==
- 2017: Best Young Actor (Die Opfer - Vergesst mich nicht), German Actors Award(won)
- 2016: Best Young Actress (Die Opfer – Vergesst mich nicht), Bunte New Faces Award (nominated)
- 2016: Best Performance – Young Actress (Hördur), Dream Fest Cinema (won)
- 2016: Best Actress (Hördur), Children Jury Golden Sparrow (nominated)
- 2015: Best Actress, (Hördur), German Film Critics Award (nominated)
