= The People vs. Fritz Bauer =

2015 film

- Theatrical release poster
- Directed by: Lars Kraume
- Written by: Lars Kraume; Olivier Guez
- Produced by: Thomas Kufus
- Starring: Burghart Klaußner; Ronald Zehrfeld
- Cinematography: Jens Harant
- Edited by: Barbara Gies
- Music by: Christoph M. Kaiser; Julian Maas
- Distributed by: Beta Cinema
- Release dates: 7 August 2015 (Locarno); 1 October 2015 (Germany)
- Running time: 105 minutes
- Country: Germany
- Language: German
- Box office: $2.8 million

The People vs. Fritz Bauer (German: Der Staat gegen Fritz Bauer) is a 2015 German biographical drama film directed by Lars Kraume, chronicling the German Jewish prosecutor Fritz Bauer's post-war capture of former Holocaust planner Adolf Eichmann. It was screened in the Contemporary World Cinema section of the 2015 Toronto International Film Festival.

The film won the awards for Best Film, Best Direction, Best Screenplay, and three more at Deutscher Filmpreis (″Lola″) 2016. The film also won the Best Documentary Audience Award at the Philadelphia Jewish Film Festival 36. It was listed as one of eight films that could be the German submission for the Best Foreign Language Film at the 89th Academy Awards, but it was not selected.

== Plot ==
Bauer's driver finds his boss unconscious in the bathtub. He is taken to the hospital, while the police, politically motivated, suspected a suicide attempt. His opponents - especially Attorney General Kreidler and Paul Gebhardt of the Federal Criminal Police Office (BKA) - triumph.

During Bauer's recovery, a file disappears from his office. He then cites the prosecutors and asks them about progress in the prosecution of Nazi criminals. However, the prosecutors can not show anything. The young prosecutor Karl Angermann reminds Bauer that he received the file in question with the request of him, Bauer, to draft a statement. Bauer gets the feeling that he can rely on the young man, and invites him to a meeting on the weekend to his home, because he imagines in his authority as "in the enemy country". Bauer wants to bring Adolf Eichmann from Argentina to a German court. However, since the BKA and Interpol are not responsible for political crimes, Bauer is considering engaging Israeli intelligence service Mossad.

With the receipt of a letter from Argentina, Bauer learns that Eichmann lives there under a different name. He passes on the letter to the Mossad and speaks in Israel as well. The Mossad boss Isser Harel already checked this trail, but wants Eichmann to be abducted only if Bauer has a second proof.

Angermann asks Bauer for advice on the sentence in a homosexual trial. After Bauer's reference to a similar process, Angermann then demands a sensationally low penalty. Victoria, a friend of the defendant, thanks Angermann and invites him to the nightclub "Kokett". Angermann falls in love with the woman, who turns out to be transgender. At the same time, the BKA has photos of sexual activities between them and tries to blackmail him with them.

When Bauer discovers that the former Nazi Schneider at Daimler-Benz works in the human resources department for South America, he puts pressure on him to obtain Eichmann's code name in Argentina. He directs this to the Mossad to confirm the first lane. Eichmann is abducted in the sequence in Argentina by the Mossad and abducted to Israel. Bauer's application for extradition of Eichmann is rejected by the federal government under Konrad Adenauer, as there are extensive arms deals between the FRG and Israel and is feared by possible statements of Eichmann in front of a German court, a government crisis, as many former Nazis are represented in the state apparatus up to the Cabinet.

Angermann cannot be blackmailed with the compromising photos and turns himself in for violating § 175. Bauer, who temporarily thought of giving up, then plunges into the Nazi investigation, which eventually leads to the Frankfurt Auschwitz trials.

== Cast ==
- Burghart Klaußner as Attorney General Fritz Bauer
- Ronald Zehrfeld as Prosecuting Attorney Karl Angermann
- Jörg Schüttauf as Paul Gebhardt
- Sebastian Blomberg as Ulrich Kreidler
- Lilith Stangenberg as Victoria
- Michael Schenk as Adolf Eichmann
- Stefan Gebelhoff as Willem Sassen
- Pierre Shrady as Eberhard Fritsch
- Götz Schubert as Georg August Zinn
- Nicole Johannhanwahr-Balk as Vera Eichmann
- Tilo Werner as Isser Harel
- Dani Levy as Chaim Cohn
- Matthias Weidenhöfer as Zvi Aharoni
- Laura Tonke as Fräulein Schütt
- Arndt Schwering-Sohnrey as Prosecuting Attorney Kügler
- Daniel Krauss as Prosecuting Attorney Vogel
- Rüdiger Klink as Heinz Mahler
- Andrej Kaminsky as Police Officer
- Jacky Bar-Lev as Bus Driver

== See also ==
- Labyrinth of Lies (2014)

== Book ==
Steinke, Ronen (2020). Fritz Bauer: The Jewish Prosecutor Who Brought Eichmann to Trial. Bloomington: Indiana University Press. ISBN 978-0-253-04687-1.
