= Inbetween Worlds =

2014 film

- Film poster
- Original title: Zwischen Welten
- Directed by: Feo Aladag
- Written by: Feo Aladag
- Produced by: Feo Aladag
- Starring: Ronald Zehrfeld
- Cinematography: Judith Kaufmann
- Edited by: Andrea Mertens
- Music by: Jan A.P. Kaczmarek
- Release dates: 11 February 2014 (Berlin); 27 March 2014 (Germany)
- Running time: 103 minutes
- Countries: Germany; Afghanistan
- Languages: German; English; Dari; Pashto

Inbetween Worlds (German: Zwischen Welten) is a 2014 German drama film produced, written and directed by Feo Aladag. The film tells the story of a friendship between the German soldier Jesper and his young Afghan interpreter Tarik. Both men are confronted with the adversities between their diverging cultures, their set of values as well as the risk of the international engagement in the Hindukush.

The film stars the German actors Ronald Zehrfeld, Burghart Klaussner, Felix Kramer, Pit Bukowski and the Afghan actors Mohsin Ahmady, Saida Barmaki and Abdul Salam Yusoufzai. It was produced by Independent Artists Filmproduktion, a company founded by Aladag in 2005.

Inbetween Worlds had its world premiere on 11 February 2014 in the competition section of the 64th Berlin International Film Festival. It had its German release on 27 March 2014.

== Cast ==
- Ronald Zehrfeld as Jesper
- Mohamad Mohsen as Tarik
- Saida Barmaki as Nala
- Salam Yousefzai as Haroon
- Burghart Klaußner as Oberst Haar
- Felix Kramer as Oli
- Pit Bukowski as Teckl
- Tobias Schönenberg as Petze
- Roman-Timothy Rien as Sepp
- Abdul Sabor Rasooly as Zia Khan
- Sher Aqa as Malik Habib
- Ali Reza as Fela

== Development ==
Feo Aladag came up with the idea of making a film about German soldiers in Afghanistan when she saw a newspaper photograph showing a German soldier in Afghanistan back in 2002/3.

It seemed unfair to her how the work of German soldiers was being reflected in German society she describes in an interview with the magazine Indie Wire: "Too much of too unreflected United We Stand makes me shiver, but too little respect for commitment and bravery make me feel worse. [...] It seemed time to shift perspective and move beyond the trauma. It's vital to communicate, to tell stories, to trigger some sort of dialogue and empathy by generating options of identification".

Aladag's research began with much reading about the German army and Afghanistan. During research, she made three trips to Afghanistan, each time for two to three weeks. She lived with German soldiers, accompanied them on patrols, made contact with the locals and listened to their stories like that of the 18-year-old Afghan main actor Mohsin Ahmady who does not know his exact date of birth and has had first-hand experience of what it means to grow up in Afghanistan: In 2002, while still a pupil at the Gore Mar High School, he had to deal with the death of his father. Since then, as an eldest son, he has worked in order to earn money for his family and taken every opportunity to advance his education.

== Filming locations ==
Inbetween Worlds was shot primarily on location in northern Afghanistan, in and around the cities of Mazar-e-Sharif and Kunduz. This was necessary for the highest authenticity in environment, cast and atmosphere. Director Aladag said "I didn’t want a German Turk speaking a fantasy dialect in Morocco". Shooting locations in Germany were North Rhine Westphalia and Lower Saxony.

== Critical reception ==
Deborah Young describes in The Hollywood Reporter that the "territories are bound to appreciate the realism and muscular shooting by a woman director and crew (shades of Kathryn Bigelow and Zero Dark Thirty) on location in northern Afghanistan" and that "the immediacy and tension with which Aladag conveys the daily life of the soldiers is something to take home".

Guy Lodge writes in the Variety that the film "is a sensitive corrective to more partisan war dramas" and that the "film's visual palette, as well as its marriage of classic melodrama with contempo grit, is most strongly reminiscent of Susanne Bier's earlier work; if seen in the right places, it’s slick enough to potentially secure her an English-language assignment".

Fionnuala Halliganut wrote in Screen Daily that Inbetween Worlds is a "nuanced story, stylishly shot with a good deal of integrity", which '"should attract international arthouse audiences intrigued by the added weight of a German military presence in a modern battle zone".
