= Ronald Zehrfeld =

German actor (born 1977)

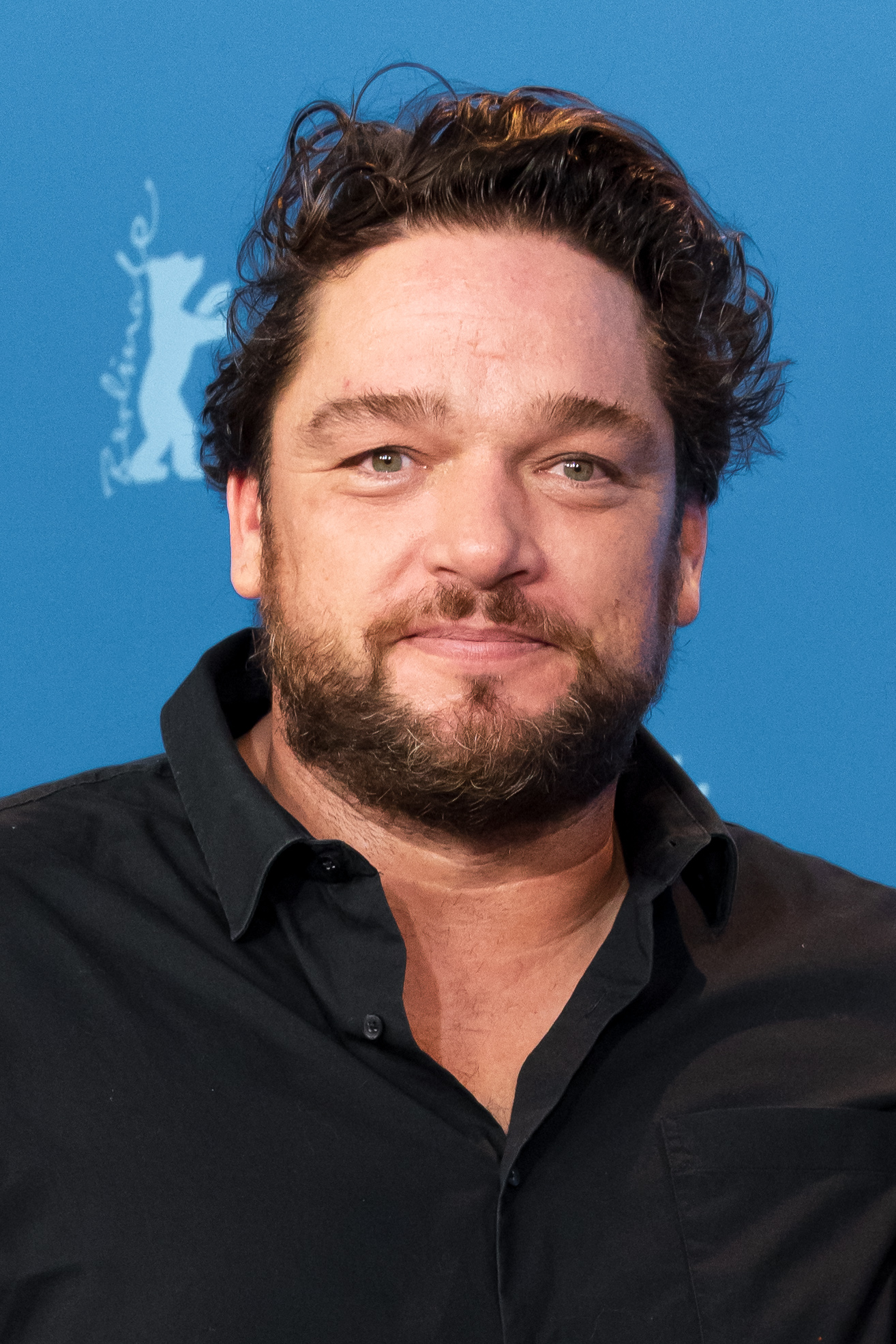
- Zehrfeld in 2023
- Born: 15 January 1977 (age 48); East Berlin, East Germany
- Occupation: Actor

Ronald Zehrfeld (German: [ˈʁoːnalt ˈtseːɐ̯fɛlt]; born 15 January 1977) is a German actor. His movie roles include Barbara (2012), Inbetween Worlds (2014), and Phoenix (2014).

== Career ==
Zehrfeld made his film debut in 2005 with a lead role in Dominik Graf's The Red Cockatoo. He starred in the comedic pirate movie 12 Paces Without a Head directed by Sven Taddicken where he played the role of the pirate Klaus Störtebeker.

In 2010, he played a major role as an idealistic Berlin police detective in Dominik Graf's elaborate and critically acclaimed television ten-part series Im Angesicht des Verbrechens. In 2011 he works with Graf again in the crime drama "Cassandra's Warning" (2011) from the series Polizeiruf 110, this time in an unfamiliar role as a murderous villain, and in the TV crime drama The Invisible Girl. He also takes supporting role in Matthias Glasner's TV mystery thriller The Hour of the Wolf (2011).

In 2012 he starred in Christian Petzold's Barbara, which won Silver Bear for Best Director at the 62nd Berlin International Film Festival. The film was selected as the German entry for the Best Foreign Language Oscar at the 85th Academy Awards, but it did not make the final shortlist.

In 2014 Zehrfeld appeared in several movies. In Dominik Graf's historical film Beloved Sisters he played Wilhelm von Wolzogen, a college friend of the main character Friedrich Schiller, it was selected as the German entry for the Best Foreign Language Film at the 87th Academy Awards, but was not nominated. In the war drama Inbetween Worlds he appears as a German soldier in Afghanistan, who falls into a crisis of conscience. The children's film The Pasta Detectives shows him as a new resident of an apartment building in which there are mysterious happenings. He also starred in Christian Petzold's postwar drama Phoenix alongside Nina Hoss; the movie received universal acclaim from critics.

Zehrfeld won the 2016 German Film Award in the category Best Supporting Actor for his role in Lars Kraume's history-thriller film The People vs. Fritz Bauer.

== Selected filmography ==
Year	Title	Role	Director	Notes
2005	Goldjunge	Ronny	Stephan Schiffers	Short film
2006	The Red Cockatoo	Wolle	Dominik Graf	
2008	The Wall: The Final Days	Dirk Faber	Thomas Berger	TV film
2008	At Any Second	Ben Weissner	Jan Fehse	
2009	12 Paces Without a Head	Klaus Störtebeker	Sven Taddicken	
2010	The Frontier	Robert Klaars	Roland Suso Richter	TV film
2010	Im Angesicht des Verbrechens	Sven Lottner	Dominik Graf	TV miniseries
2010	In the Jungle	Frank Sperber	Elmar Fischer	TV film
2011	Polizeiruf 110 - Episode: "Cassandras Warnung"	Gerry Vogt	Dominik Graf	TV series episode
2011	Cracks in the Shell	Joachim	Christian Schwochow	
2011	Die Stunde des Wolfes	Tom Faller	Matthias Glasner	TV film
2011	The Invisible Girl	Niklas Tanner	Dominik Graf	TV film
2012	Barbara	Dr. André Reiser	Christian Petzold	
2012	Shores of Hope	Matthias Schönherr	Toke Constantin Hebbeln	
2013	The Impossible Crime	Kommissar Gödicke	Stephan Wagner	TV film
2013	Finsterworld	Tom	Frauke Finsterwalder	
2014	Lose My Self	Roman	Jan Schomburg	
2014	Inbetween Worlds	Jesper	Feo Aladag	
2014	The Pasta Detectives	Simon Westbühl	Neele Vollmar	
2014	Beloved Sisters	Wilhelm von Wolzogen	Dominik Graf	
2014	Phoenix	Johnny Lenz	Christian Petzold	
2014	The King's Surrender	Kevin	Philipp Leinemann	
2015	Tannbach	Konrad Werner	Alexander Dierbach	TV miniseries
2015	The Pasta Detectives 2	Simon Westbühl	Wolfgang Groos	
2015	The People vs. Fritz Bauer	Prosecutor Karl Angermann	Lars Kraume	
2015	The Burglar	Michael	Hagar Ben-Asher	Israeli co-production
2016	Sag mir nichts	Martin	Andreas Kleinert	TV film
2016	Manhunt: Escape to the Carpathians	Sven Schröder	Dominik Graf	TV film
2017	Redemption Road	Richard Kornitzer	Matthias Glasner	TV film
2017	SS-GB	Captain Hans Hesse	Philipp Kadelbach	TV miniseries/2 episodes
2018	The Silent Revolution		Lars Kraume	
2019	Sweethearts	Frank	Karoline Herfurth	
2020	Babylon Berlin	Walter Weintraub		TV miniseries/12 episodes
2020	Barbarians	Berulf		TV miniseries/2 episodes
2023	Ingeborg Bachmann – Journey into the Desert		Margarethe von Trotta	

== Awards and nominations ==
Year	Award	Category	Work	Result	Ref(s)
2006	Undine Award	Best Debut, Male	The Red Cockatoo	Nominated	
2006	New Faces Award	Actor	The Red Cockatoo	Nominated	
2011	Grimme-Preis	Fiction	Im Angesicht des Verbrechens	Won	
2012	Deutscher Filmpreis	Best Actor	Barbara	Nominated	
2013	Baden-Baden TV Film Festival	Best Performance	The Impossible Crime	Won	
2013	German Film Critics Association Award	Best Actor	Barbara	Nominated	
2013	Jupiter Award	Best German TV Actor	The Invisible Girl	Won	
2014	Grimme-Preis	Fiction	The Impossible Crime	Won	
2016	German Film Award	Best Supporting Actor	The People vs. Fritz Bauer	Won	
