= Im Angesicht des Verbrechens =

German television series

- Created by: Dominik Graf
- Starring: Max Riemelt; Ronald Zehrfeld; Marie Bäumer; Mišel Matičević
- Country of origin: Germany
- No. of seasons: 1
- No. of episodes: 10

Production
- Running time: 50 minutes

Original release
- Network: Arte; Das Erste
- Release: 2010

Im Angesicht des Verbrechens (English title: In the Face of Crime) is a German television series about the Russian mafia in Berlin. It received high critical acclaim, but the viewer figures were disappointing. The 10 episodes of the series were broadcast by ARTE and Das Erste in 2010 and are also available on DVD in the United States.

== Characters ==
- Max Riemelt is Marek Gorsky, a Soviet Jewish immigrant from Riga. Haunted by the murder of his older brother who had chosen to become a gangster, Marek has defied the values of his family and community by becoming a police officer. For this reason, Marek is widely despised as a Musor and a traitor to his own people. Despite this, he is determined to enforce the law and ultimately to solve the murder of his brother.
- Ronald Zehrfeld is Sven Lottner, a former apprentice Stasi agent and Marek's partner in the police force. Like Marek, Sven is a tenacious investigator who will do his duty even when obstructed by corrupt police colleagues. He is also a consummate womanizer.
- Marie Bäumer is Stella, Marek's beloved sister, who is married to Misha, one of the most powerful Russian mafia bosses in Berlin. Aware that her husband has a mistress, Stella debates leaving him, but ultimately becomes involved in his illegal businesses.
- Mišel Matičević is Misha, a Russian Thief in law, the owner of the Odessa night club, and Stella's husband. The night club serves as the headquarters of the crime family that Misha leads and which has made him a fortune through the black market trade in untaxed cigarettes. Despite having a mistress, Misha is shown to be far more loving and considerate to his wife than Tony Soprano, which is why she reluctantly stays with him. Early in the series, Misha attempts to corrupt Marek by feeding him information about a rival crime family. Although this is a violation of the Thieves' Law, Misha rationalizes his act by reminding his followers that the rival gang rejects the Law completely. Misha's violation of the Law ultimately fails to corrupt Marek and leads both crime families to the brink of war.
- Ryszard Ronczewski is Uncle Sasha, a Soviet Jewish Thief in law from Odessa and relative to Marek and Stella. Despite appearing to be merely the simple owner of a shoe repair shop, Uncle Sasha is viewed as the elder statesman of Berlin's Russian underworld. In a conversation with Stella, Uncle Sasha relates how he has an entire room filled with the shoes of other Soviet Jewish immigrants who have joined the city's criminal underworld and been killed in its quarrels. Despite his relation to Marek, Uncle Sasha refuses to violate the Thieves' Law by revealing the name of the man who murdered Marek's brother.
- Alina Levshin is Yelena, a young and beautiful Ukrainian woman who has been lured into emigrating to Germany under the promise that she will work in a restaurant. Upon arrival, Yelena learns that she and her close friend Svetlana have been duped by a sex trafficking ring and that they are expected to work as prostitutes. Unlike Svetlana, Yelena is unwilling to turn tricks and longs to escape the prostitution ring. Shortly before leaving for Germany, Yelena has a vision under water which leads her to believe that Marek is her true love.
- Vladimir Burlakov
