= The Silent Revolution (2018 film) =

2018 German film

- German: Das schweigende Klassenzimmer
- Literally: The Silent Classroom
- Directed by: Lars Kraume
- Screenplay by: Lars Kraume
- Based on: Das schweigende Klassenzimmer: Eine wahre Geschichte über Mut, Zusammenhalt und den Kalten Krieg lit. 'The Silent Classroom: A True Story about Courage, Solidarity and the Cold War' by Dietrich Garstka
- Produced by: Miriam Düssel; Susanne Freyer-Mathes; Kalle Friz; Isabel Hund; Thomas Kufus
- Starring: Leonard Scheicher; Tom Gramenz
- Cinematography: Jens Harant
- Edited by: Barbara Gies
- Music by: Christoph M. Kaiser; Julian Maas
- Production companies: Akzente Film & Fernsehproduktion; zero one film; StudioCanal Germany; Zweites Deutsches Fernsehen; WunderWerk
- Distributed by: StudioCanal
- Release dates: 20 February 2018 (68th Berlin International Film Festival); 1 March 2018 (Germany)
- Running time: 1 hour 51 minutes
- Country: Germany
- Languages: German; Russian; Hungarian; English
- Box office: US$1,264,193

The Silent Revolution (German: Das schweigende Klassenzimmer, lit. 'The Silent Classroom') is a 2018 German historical drama film written and directed by Lars Kraume. The film depicts the true story of a high school class in the German Democratic Republic, who have a moment of silence for the victims of the failed Hungarian Revolution of 1956, and who conflict with the state, based on the book of the same name by Dietrich Garstka who was one of the students.

== Plot ==
In late 1956, prior to the 1961 construction of the Berlin Wall, East German (GDR) high school students Kurt and Theo secretly go to the cinema in West Berlin. They watch a newsreel and learn of the anti-communist Hungarian uprising. Back home in Stalinstadt, they convince some class members to visit the nearby home of Edgar, the great-uncle of one of the students, Paul. At Edgar's, the students listen to the radio station RIAS, broadcasting from West Berlin. While listening, they learn of the death of Ferenc Puskás, a Hungarian footballer adored by the students, which ultimately turns out to be misinformation, possibly intended to infuriate the protesters. Kurt manages to convince the majority of the class to hold a moment of silence for the victims in Hungary before class starts. This upsets their teacher, and student Erik tells him it is an act of protest. After once again meeting at Edgar's, the class takes a vote and decides to lie about what happened, and to say it was a moment of mourning for footballer Puskás.

Kessler, a zealous school superintendent, begins to look into the incident. Fritz Lange, the minister for national education in the GDR, arrives at the school and classifies the incident as counter-revolutionary and asks the class to point to the instigator. The entire class stays silent, and as punishment they are all prohibited from graduating. Under pressure, Erik confesses the entire story about Edgar and listening to RIAS. Edgar is then arrested, with Paul witnessing the arrest. Theo's father tries to reason with Lange, but he is not taken seriously due to his involvement with the East German uprising of 1953.

The next day, Kessler interrogates every member of the class. To up the pressure on Erik, she tells Erik that his father, whom he reveres as a socialist hero, was actually a Nazi collaborator who was then hanged by the Red Army. Erik cannot deal with this, betrays Kurt, and shoots his firearm instructor. After threatening his mother, he is overpowered by three of his classmates. He then confesses to having betrayed Kurt. That evening, Kessler tries to convince Kurt to put the blame on Erik. Kurt refuses and flees to West Berlin. The next day, Kessler asks every class member to confirm that Kurt was indeed the instigator of the moment of silence, to which the class refuses. Following their refusal they are all expelled, and within a few days they collectively flee to West Berlin.

== Cast ==
- Leonard Scheicher as Theo Lemke
- Tom Gramenz as Kurt Wächter
- Lena Klenke as Lena
- Isaiah Michalski as Paul
- Jonas Dassler as Erik Babinsky
- Florian Lukas as School director Schwarz
- Jördis Triebel as Frau Kessler, investigator
- Michael Gwisdek as Uncle Edgar
- Burghart Klaußner as Fritz Lange, education minister
- Ronald Zehrfeld as Hermann Lemke, Theo's father
- Carina Wiese as Irmgard Lemke, Theo's mother
- Max Hopp as Hans Wächter, Kurt's father
- Judith Engel as Anna Wächter, Kurt's mother
- Bettina Hoppe as Christa, Erik's mother
- Götz Schubert as Pfarrer Melzer, Erik's father
- Daniel Krauss as Lange, secretary of the Free German Youth
- Rolf Kanies as Wardetzki, shooting teacher
- Carmen-Maja Antoni as Lena's grandmother

== Reception ==
On the review aggregator website Rotten Tomatoes, 90% of 10 critics' reviews are positive, with an average rating of 7.3/10.
