= Home Coming (2006 film) =

- Film poster
- Turkish: Eve Dönüş
- Directed by: Ömer Ugur
- Written by: Ömer Ugur
- Produced by: Hayri Aslan
- Starring: Memet Ali Alabora; Sibel Kekilli
- Cinematography: Mustafa Kusçu
- Edited by: Ulas Cihan Simsek
- Music by: Tamer Ciray
- Release date: 3 November 2006
- Running time: 101 minutes
- Countries: Turkey; Greece
- Language: Turkish

Home Coming (Turkish: Eve Dönüş) is a 2006 Greek-Turkish drama film directed by Ömer Ugur.

== Cast ==
- Memet Ali Alabora as Mustafa
- Sibel Kekilli as Esma
- Altan Erkekli as Hoca
- Civan Canova as Iskenceci Komiser
- Erdal Tosun as Iskenceci polis
