= Civan Canova =

Turkish actor (1955–2022)

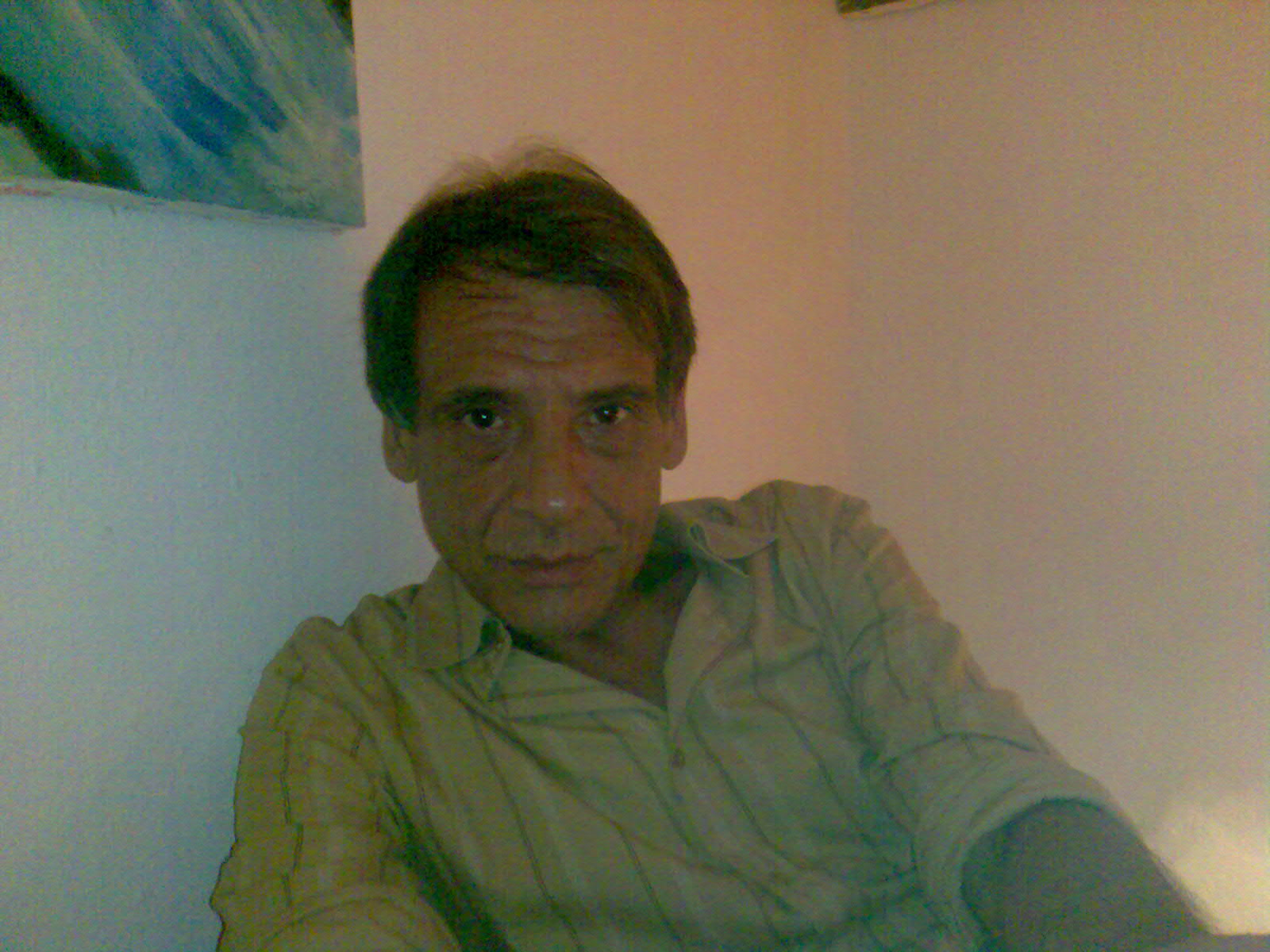
- Canova in 2007
- Born: Ahmet Civan Canova; 28 June 1955; Ankara, Turkey
- Died: 20 August 2022 (aged 67); Istanbul, Turkey
- Education: TED Ankara College (1973); Ankara State Conservatory
- Occupations: Actor, playwright, theatre director
- Years active: 1974–2022
- Spouse: Açelya Akkoyun (m. 1998; div. 2004)
- Parents: Mahir Canova (father); Gündüz Sencer (mother)
- Relatives: Kartal Tibet (stepfather)
- Website: www.civancanova.org

Ahmet Civan Canova (28 June 1955 – 20 August 2022) was a Turkish actor, playwright and theatre director.

== Life and career ==
Canova was the son of Turkish director Mahir Canova. He was a graduate of TED Ankara College (1973). He started his career as an actor by making his cinematic debut in Yılmaz Güney's 1974 movie Arkadaş. In the same year, he enrolled in the Ankara State Conservatory's Theater Department. After four years of studying, he joined the crew of Turkish State Theatres. Aside from his acting career both on stage and in front of the camera, he is known for his plays. Between 1998–2004, he was married to actress Açelya Akkoyun. Canova continued to work for the State Theatres.

He died of lung cancer on 20 August 2022, at the age of 67, following a long illness.

== Plays written ==
- Düğün Şarkısı
- Erkekler Tuvaleti
- Evaristo
- Ful Yaprakları
- Gala
- Kör Buluşma
- Kızıl Ötesi Aydınlık
- MitosMorfos
- Neon
- Niobe
- Sokağa Çıkma Yasağı
- Üstat Harpagona Saygı ve Destek Gecesi

== Filmography ==
=== Film ===
- Arkadaş (1974) as Halil
- Nehir (1977) as Engin
- Yaşamak Bu Değil (1981) as Fatih
- Mutlu Ol Yeter (1981)
- Berduşlar (1982) as Kenan
- Yıkılan Gurur (1983) as Naci
- Hırsız (1986)
- Acı Lokma (1986) as Ömer
- Sokaktaki Adam (1995)
- 80. Adım (1996) as Sedat
- Sır (1997)
- Ömerçip (2003) as Celal
- Eve Dönüş (2006) as İşkenceci Polis
- 72. Koğuş (2010) as Hilmi
- F Tipi

=== Television ===
- Yalancı Şafak (1990)
- Bizim Aile (1995) as Ataç
- Çiçek Taksi (2000) as Celal Kıraç
- Gece Yürüyüşü (2004) as Cüneyt
- Çeşm-i Bülbül (2005)
- Esir Kalpler (2006) as Ekrem Akerman
- Arka Sokaklar (2007) as Nazım Tahsin
- Eksik Etek (2007)
- Sınıf (2008) as Şeref
- Ay Işığı (2008) as Yıldırım Duman
- Sensiz Yaşayamam (2010) as Mummer
- Fatmagül'ün Suçu Ne? (2011–12) as Kadir
- Karadayı (2012)
- Her Sevda Bir Veda (2014)
- Paramparça (2014) as Rahmi Gürpinar
- Atiye (2019–21) as Mustafa Özgürsoy
- Üç Kuruş (2021–22) as Oktay

== Awards ==
- Ministry of Culture and Tourism – 1989: Best Script Award for Kör Buluşma
- İsmet Küntay Awards – 1994: Best Playwright Award for Kıyamet Sularında
- Avni Dilligil Awards – 1996: Best Playwright Award for Kıyamet Sularında
- Cevdet Kudret Literature Awards – 1997: Best Play Award for Sokağa Çıkma Yasağı
- Avni Dilligil Awards – 2000: Best Playwright Award for Sokağa Çıkma Yasağı
- 43rd Antalya Golden Orange Film Festival – 2006: Best Supporting Actor Award for Eve Dönüş
- 12th Sadri Alışık Awards – 2007: Best Supporting Actor Award for Eve Dönüş
- 15th Afife Theatre Awards: Most Successful Supporting Actor of the Year Award for Bury the Dead
