= A Regular Woman =

2019 German biographical film

- Directed by: Sherry Hormann
- Starring: Almila Bagriacik; Aram Arami
- Cinematography: Judith Kaufmann
- Release date: 27 April 2019 (TFF)
- Running time: 90 minutes
- Country: Germany
- Language: German

A Regular Woman (German: Nur eine Frau) is a 2019 German biographical film directed by Sherry Hormann. It is based on the life of Hatun "Aynur" Sürücü who was killed by her brother in an honour killing.

Hormann stated that by 2019 people were "increasingly fencing ourselves in", so she decided to make the film.

The film is narrated by an actress playing Sürücü. The characters, in the initial scene, speak Turkish until one breaks the fourth wall and acknowledges that the viewers cannot comprehend their speech, before the characters switch to German, the primary medium of the film. The film includes some video footage of the real Sürücü with her boyfriend.

== Reception ==
Alissa Simon of Variety wrote that how "accomplished and watchable" the film turned out to be "owes much to its fine cast and impeccable technical package."

Keith Ulrich of The Hollywood Reporter wrote that the actors were "excellent" and that it was "meticulous dramatic reenactment designed specifically to give a victim back their voice — quite the honorable intention." Ulrich criticised how the film highlights "the fact that Aynur's murder is a foregone conclusion" and the final death scene. The film received the Cinema for Peace Award for Justice in 2020.
