= When We Leave =

2010 film

- Film poster
- Directed by: Feo Aladag
- Written by: Feo Aladag
- Produced by: Feo Aladag
- Starring: Sibel Kekilli
- Cinematography: Judith Kaufmann
- Edited by: Andrea Mertens
- Music by: Max Richter; Stephané Moucha
- Distributed by: 20th Century Fox
- Release dates: 13 February 2010 (Berlinale); 11 March 2010
- Running time: 119 minutes
- Countries: Germany; Turkey
- Languages: German; Turkish

When We Leave (German: Die Fremde, Turkish: Ayrılık) is a 2010 German-Turkish drama film, produced, written and directed by Austrian filmmaker Feo Aladag. The film received worldwide acclaim and represented Aladag's debut as a producer, writer, and director.

When We Leave tells the story of a young German/Turkish mother's struggle for self-determination between two systems of values. It is a multi-layered story about honour, intolerance, and the unshakeable belief in a harmonious coexistence. The film stars Sibel Kekilli, Florian Lukas, Alwara Höfels, Nursel Köse, and Turkish actors Settar Tanrıöğen and Derya Alabora. It was produced by Independent Artists, a company founded by Aladag in 2005.

When We Leave had its world premiere on 13 February 2010 at the 60th Berlin International Film Festival. It screened in the special Panorama section and was awarded the Europa Cinemas Label Prize. It began its German release on 11 March 2010. Reviewers called When We Leave "the strongest debut film in years" and gave special notice to the sensitive direction of the actors as well as the courage the film showed in addressing such heated subject matter.

The film was awarded numerous national and international prizes, including seven nominations for the 2010 German Film Awards, in the categories Best Film, Best Debut Film, Best Screenplay, Best Actress, Best Cinematography, Best Editing, and Best Score. It went on to win in two categories, Best Film (Bronze) and Best Actress.

The film also won the LUX Film Prize for Best European Film 2010, the New Faces Award (Best First Feature), the DEFA Board's Emerging Artists Prize (Best First Feature 2010), the Grand Prize for Best Film at the 2010 Tribeca Film Festival as well as many others from film festivals including Ghent, São Paulo, and Calgary.

When We Leave played at more than 100 film festivals worldwide, in 73 countries, and on 6 continents. On 17 September 2010 the German selection committee chose the film as its official entry in the competition for the Academy Award for Best Foreign Language Film.

== Plot ==
Umay (Sibel Kekilli) lives with her husband Kemal (Ufuk Bayraktar) and son Cem (Nizam Schiller) in the suburbs of Istanbul. Kemal has regular violent outbursts against both his wife and son. Umay's longing for her home and parents in Berlin finally overwhelms her. She packs up her things and flees her life and marriage in Istanbul.

She returns to her family home in Berlin, where she hopes to start a new, independent life with her son. She hopes her family will be supportive of her new beginning, but when Umay's father Kader (Setter Tanröigen) learns what Umay has done, he orders her to return immediately. According to tradition she belongs forever to her husband Kemal. Umay refuses to go and burns her passport. "Stop dreaming!" her mother tells her, as her siblings suffer rejection in their community based on their sister's actions.

Mehmet, Umay's older brother (Tamer Yigit), and Kader devise a plan to kidnap young Cem and take him back to his father in Istanbul. Umay overhears them and flees to start a new life with her son, without her family. She moves to a women's shelter, where she builds a new life for herself. Through her work at a kitchen she meets Stipe (Florian Lukas), a colleague she feels drawn to.

Soon she even has her own apartment and a satisfying new life. Only one thing is missing; her family. Again and again she tries to contact her mother and younger brother Acar. Every time she fails. During all of this, her father and brothers come to a difficult decision. Acar (Serhad Can) has earned a terrible fate; he's been elected to kill his beloved sister to restore his family's lost honour.

== Cast ==
- Sibel Kekilli as Umay
- Nizam Schiller as Cem
- Derya Alabora as Halyme
- Settar Tanriogen as Kader
- Tamer Yiğit as Mehmet
- Serhad Can as Acar
- Almila Bagriacik as Rana
- Florian Lukas as Stipe
- Nursel Köse as Gül
- Alwara Höfels as Atife
- Ufuk Bayraktar as Kemal
- Blanca Apilánez as Carmen
- Rosa Enskat as Manuela

Aladag worked with an extremely diverse group of both trained and non-trained actors for the film, some of which came from street-casting sessions. Nizam Schiller (Cem), Almila Bagriacik (Rana) and Serhad Can (Acar) all made their screen debut in the film. Her own acting experience helped Aladag to individualise her approach to each actor in the film. All non-actors participated in an acting workshop which lasted several months, during which Aladag helped them learn from her experience in front of the camera.

== Background ==
When We Leave was produced by Independent Artists in co-production with WDR, RBB and ARTE. It was supported by the Medienboard Berlin-Brandenburg, the BKM, the NRW Film Board and the Kuratorium junger deutscher Film.

The film had its debut at the Berlin Film Festival. Afterwards it was released on 11 March 2010 throughout Germany by its German Distributor Majestic. The director supported the theatrical release with a Germany-wide Q&A tour. On 27 August 2010 Majestic Home Entertainment released the film on Blu-ray and DVD.

== Development ==
While directing PSAs for Amnesty International's "Violence Against Women" campaign, Aladag began researching themes related to domestic violence. Her research led her to a series of honour killings in Germany, mainly perpetrated against women who tried to free themselves from familial and social pressures.

She quickly became engrossed in her quest to understand the complex family dynamics that contribute to honour killings. Out of this passion came the desire to create a cinematic story that dealt with the fate of a young German woman of Turkish origins. Aladag researched for over two years and consulted with various experts on the issues involved. She researched police case files from the previous fifteen years and discovered similar patterns in them that helped her begin writing the screenplay.

Aladag wanted to distil the conflicts she found in those documents in her screenplay. She wanted to create an emotional, authentic but also universal story, without moral judgments and with the goal of showing not only the conflict, but also to empathetically portray the tragedy of the situation.

== Production and post-production ==
Production began on 15 July 2008 for what was to be a 39-day shoot. When We Leave was shot on 35 mm in Cinemascope. Aladag worked closely with editor Andrea Mertens for four months at Cineimpuls, a post-production house in Berlin.

== Critical reception ==
Joseph Smiegelski wrote in the Huffington Post that he "consider[ed] When We Leave one of the best movies I have ever seen. It is Bicycle Thief good, and the kind of movie I like the most: a simple yet meaningful story told without bells and whistles and with a small number of major characters. [It] is a remarkable artistic achievement. You must see this film."

Ray Bennett wrote in The Hollywood Reporter that When We Leave is "a universal story that will connect with audiences."

On review aggregator website Rotten Tomatoes, the film holds an approval rating of 72% based on 32 reviews, with an average rating of 6.3/10.

== Awards ==
The film won Best Narrative Feature at the 9th Tribeca Film Festival, Best Film at the 37th Film Fest Gent in Belgium, the European Parliament's Lux Prize, and was selected as the German entry for the Best Foreign Language Film at the 83rd Academy Awards, but it didn't make the final shortlist.

== See also ==
- List of submissions to the 83rd Academy Awards for Best Foreign Language Film
- List of German submissions for the Academy Award for Best Foreign Language Film
