= Barbara (2012 film) =

2012 film

- Film poster
- Directed by: Christian Petzold
- Written by: Christian Petzold; Harun Farocki
- Produced by: Florian Koerner von Gustorf
- Starring: Nina Hoss; Ronald Zehrfeld; Jasna Fritzi Bauer; Mark Waschke; Rainer Bock; Jannik Schümann
- Cinematography: Hans Fromm
- Edited by: Bettina Böhler
- Music by: Stefan Will
- Release dates: 11 February 2012 (Berlin); 8 March 2012 (Germany)
- Running time: 105 minutes
- Country: Germany
- Language: German
- Box office: $4.1 million

Barbara is a 2012 German drama film directed by Christian Petzold and starring Nina Hoss. The film competed at the 62nd Berlin International Film Festival in February 2012, where Petzold won the Silver Bear for Best Director. The film was selected as the German entry for the Best Foreign Language Oscar at the 85th Academy Awards, but it did not make the shortlist.

== Plot ==
East Germany in 1980: Barbara is a physician who arrives for her first day at a small rural hospital near the Baltic Sea. She had been at the prestigious Charité hospital in East Berlin but, after she'd filed an "Ausreiseantrag" – an official request to leave East Germany – she had been incarcerated and transferred to the small town where she is still monitored by the Stasi. The Stasi punishes her for the hours in which they cannot find her by searching her house, strip-searching and cavity-searching her.

In her new job, she works in pediatric surgery, a department led by chief physician André Reiser. He eventually tells her a story (the veracity of which she questions) of how he too had lost his job at a more prestigious hospital in Berlin – he was responsible for an accident with an incubator (his assistant confused Fahrenheit and Celsius on a new machine from New Zealand) that left two premature infants blind. The Stasi had agreed to keep it quiet if he agreed to move to the provincial hospital and to work for them. So now Reiser reports on people under suspicion, including Barbara.

Early on, when the police deliver Stella, a young runaway from a labour camp, to the hospital for the fourth time, Reiser thinks Stella is malingering. Barbara intervenes and orders removal of the restraints on the patient, readily diagnosing her with meningitis. During her recovery, Stella develops a strong attachment to Barbara, whose welcome bedside manner includes reading the Adventures of Huckleberry Finn to her.

Stella is pregnant and wants to raise the child. She wants to escape from the country and to have her child in a new land, and implores Barbara to take her with her. The doctors cannot find grounds for keeping Stella longer and soon she is returned against her will to the labour camp.

Barbara makes secretive bicycle treks, to a place to stash her secretly received funds for escape, and to the woods where she meets with her West German lover Jörg, who has been supplying her with prized goods and is preparing for her escape. When she meets him for a second rendezvous in an "Interhotel" (an East German hotel for foreigners), he tells her of his completed plan for her escape the following weekend: she will be picked up in a small boat in the Baltic Sea and taken the short distance to Denmark.

As Barbara spends more time working with Reiser, he begins making romantic overtures, which she rebuffs although she is intrigued by and attracted to him. He has built a laboratory, to test samples, and he has created his own serums with which to treat patients. One day before her planned escape, Barbara is on duty caring for a critically ill patient named Mario, whose suicide attempt had resulted in his being hospitalized. Barbara discovers that Mario has not been recovering from his traumatic head injury as well as believed and requires immediate brain surgery. She tracks Reiser down on his day off, to inform him of Mario's urgent need of surgery. She finds him at the home of the Stasi agent who has been overseeing her monitoring. Reiser is treating the agent's wife, who is dying of cancer. Reiser persuades her to return to the hospital – the same night of her planned escape – so that he can perform the surgery, with her assistance as anaesthetist during the operation.

Following her agreement to be there, yet still planning her escape, Barbara accepts Reiser's invitation to let him cook a lunch for her at his home on the same day. When Reiser finally tells Barbara that he is happy to have her there with him, she kisses him. Then she abruptly pulls away from him, and returns to her house to continue preparing to escape.

Stella flees the labour youth detention programme again and comes to Barbara's doorstep that night. Barbara takes her to the area on the beach, where she is to meet a person who will help smuggle her out. Barbara writes a note to accompany Stella, which is presumably addressed to Jörg, explaining why she has chosen to let Stella escape, instead of going herself. After helping Stella to a waiting raft, and a skin diver who will help her escape by sea, she returns to the hospital. She takes a seat, across from Reiser, who is watching over Mario at his bedside. She has decided to stay in the East, to be with Reiser. In a final close-up, their eyes meet in mutual understanding.

== Cast ==
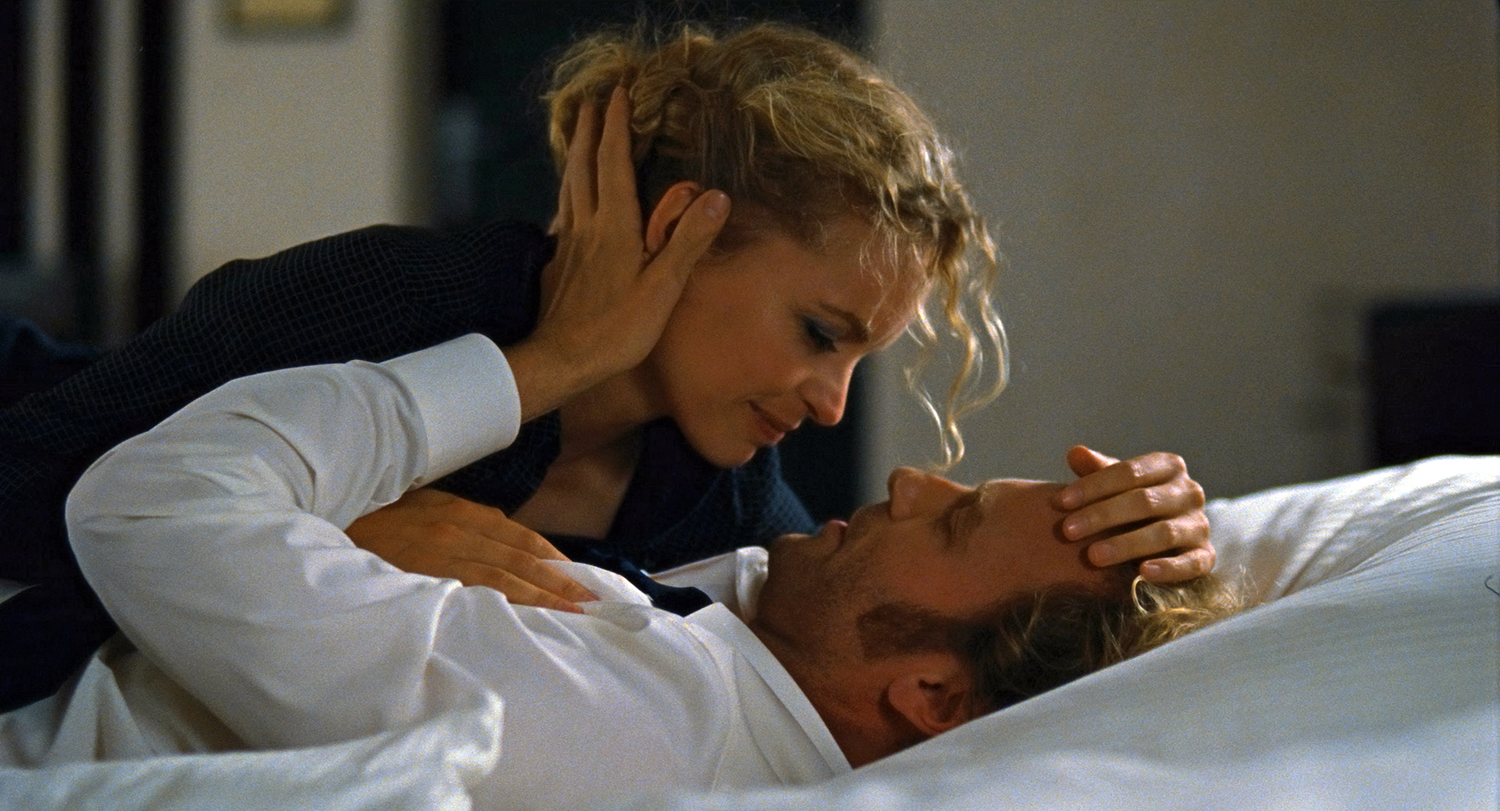
Nina Hoss and Mark Waschke

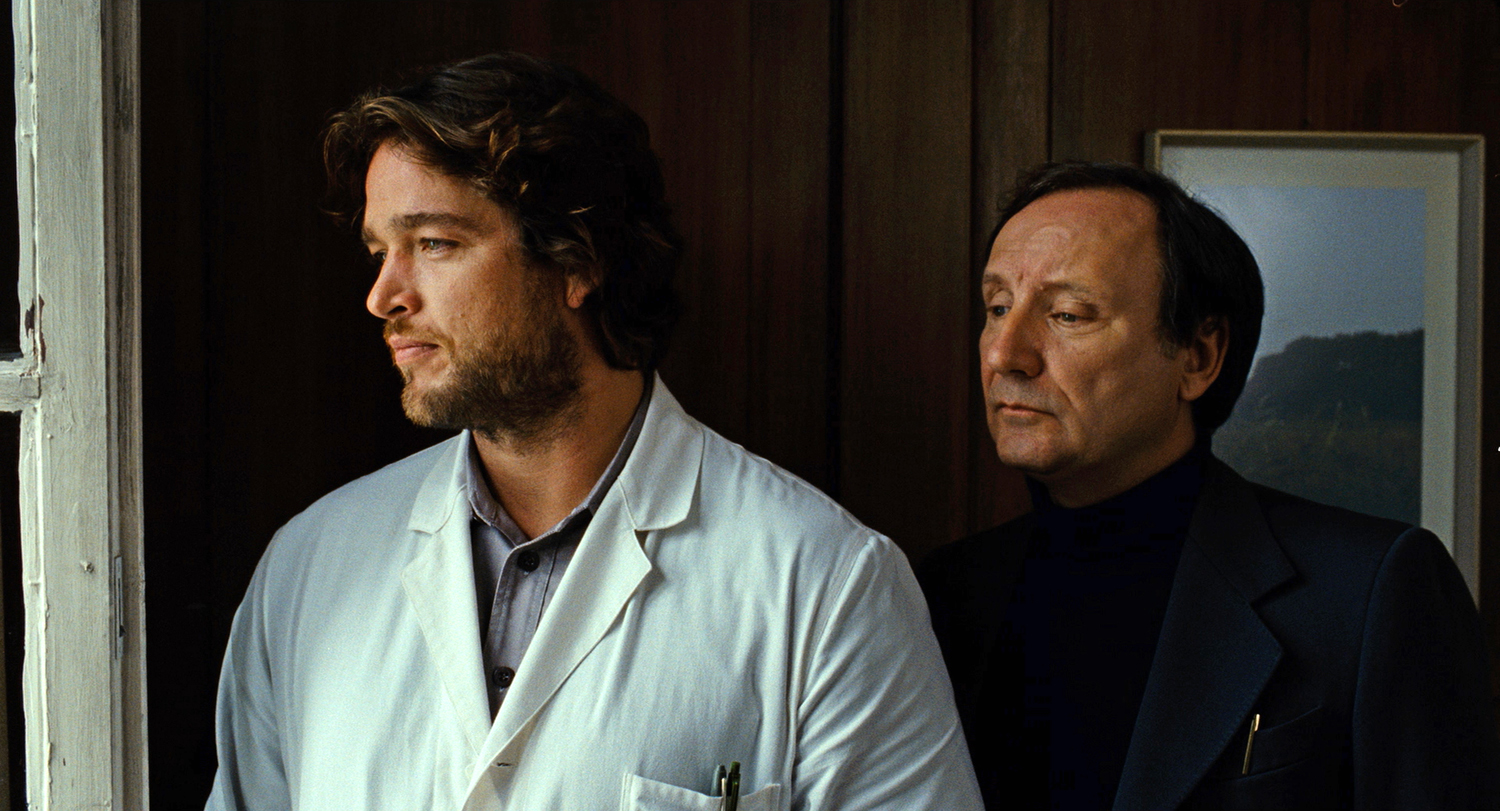
Ronald Zehrfeld and Rainer Bock

- Nina Hoss as Barbara Wolff
- Ronald Zehrfeld as Dr André Reiser
- Rainer Bock as Stasi Officer Klaus Schütz
- Jasna Fritzi Bauer as Stella
- Christina Hecke as Karin
- Mark Waschke as Jörg
- Peter Benedict as Gerhard
- Jannik Schümann as Mario
- Alicia von Rittberg as Angie
- Susanne Bormann as Steffi
- Claudia Geisler as nurse Schlösser
- Deniz Petzold as Angelo
- Rosa Enskat as janitor Bungert

== Critical reception ==
Barbara has an approval rating of 94% on Rotten Tomatoes, based on 82 reviews, with an average score of 7.8/10. The website's critical consensus reads, "Smart, solidly crafted, and thoroughly gripping, Barbara offers a deliberately paced, subtly powerful character study." The film also has a weighted average score of 86/100 on the critical aggregator website Metacritic.

Writing in The Guardian, film critic Peter Bradshaw said of Barbara: "The weird oppression and seediness of the times is elegantly captured, and Hoss coolly conveys Barbara's highly strung desperation." Bradshaw awarded the film four stars out of five. The New York Times designated Barbara a critics' pick. In her review, Manohla Dargis said of the film: "Barbara is a film about the old Germany from one of the best directors working in the new: Christian Petzold. For more than a decade Mr. Petzold has been making his mark on the international cinema scene with smart, tense films that resemble psychological thrillers, but are distinguished by their strange story turns, moral thorns, visual beauty and filmmaking intelligence." Steven Rea wrote that "Christian Petzold's masterfully hushed, suspenseful thriller percolates with dread....Hoss, wearing her blond hair pulled back tight, and wearing an expression of inscrutable melancholy, gives a performance that doesn't feel like a performance at all. Her Barbara is absolutely real, and absolutely trapped. The film is aching, and exquisite."

In The Independent, Jonathan Romney includes Barbara in the genre of war stories - "as nerve-wracking as the best." In the Chicago Sun-Times, Sheila O'Malley concluded "This is well-trod ground for Petzold, but never has it been so fully realized, so palpable, as in 'Barbara.'" In her article on Barbara, film scholar Christina Gerhardt argues that Petzold draws on melodrama and combines this genre with slow realism to add a chapter to post-Wende films about the GDR.

== See also ==
- List of submissions to the 85th Academy Awards for Best Foreign Language Film
- List of German submissions for the Academy Award for Best Foreign Language Film
