= Sibel Kekilli =

German actress

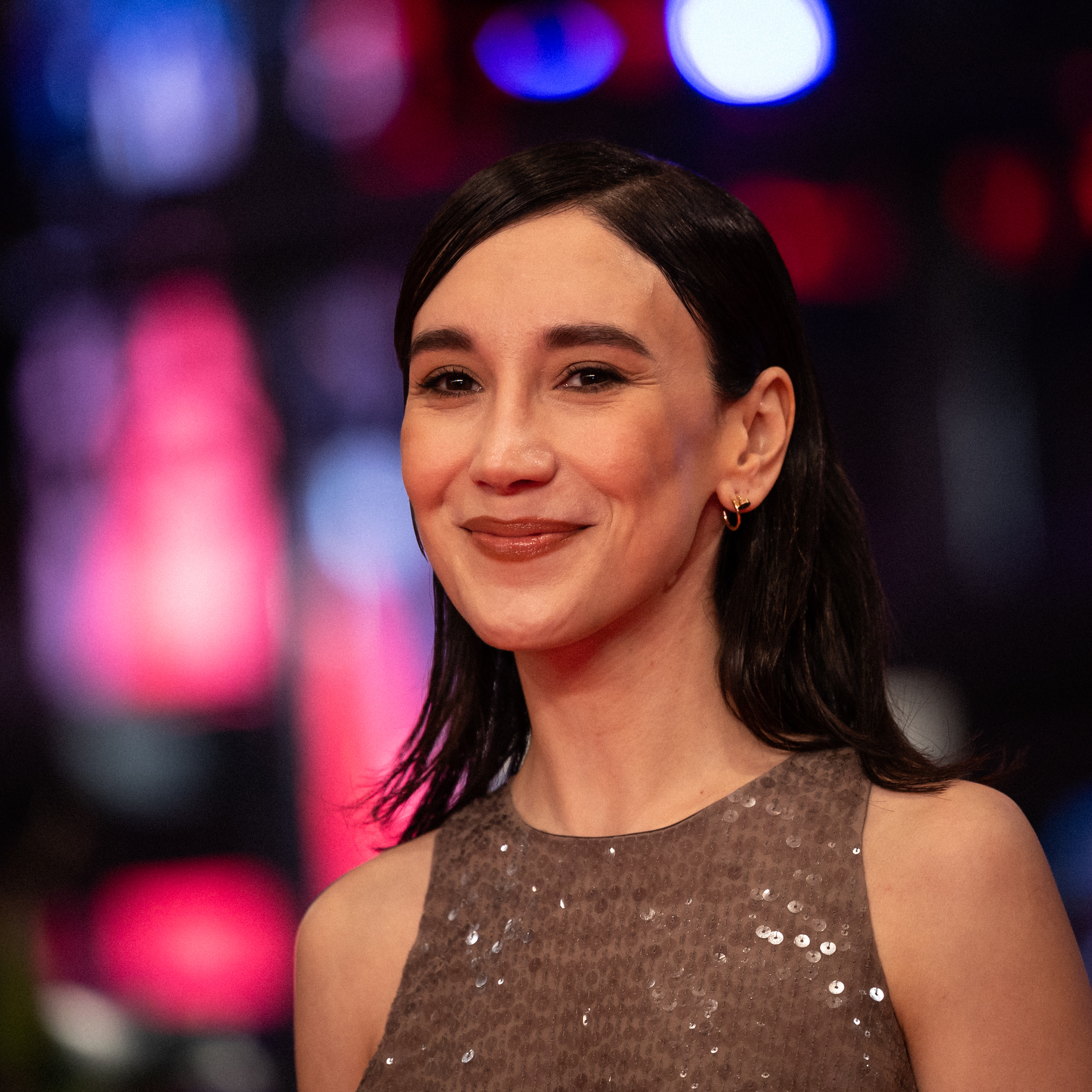
- Kekilli at the 74th Berlin International Film Festival
- Born: 16 June 1980 (age 46); Heilbronn, West Germany
- Occupation: Actress
- Years active: 2001–present
- Spouse: Andreas Daurer (m. 2026)
- Website: sibelkekilli.com/en/

Sibel Kekilli (born 16 June 1980) is a German actress. She gained public attention after starring in the 2004 film Head-On. She won two Lolas, the most prestigious German film award, for her performances in Head-On and When We Leave (2010). Beginning in 2011, she became more widely known for her role as Shae in the HBO series Game of Thrones.

== Early life ==
Sibel Kekilli was born on 16 June 1980 in Heilbronn, Baden-Württemberg, West Germany. Her parents emigrated from Turkey in 1977, and she has described them as having a rather modern and open attitude. After completing school with excellent grades at age 16, Kekilli entered a 30-month-long combined training program to become a certified public administration specialist at the local city administration.

== Career ==
After successful completion of the training program, she continued to work as an administrative assistant for another two years at Heilbronn city hall, then moved to Essen, where she worked various jobs as a bouncer, cleaner, waitress, nightclub manager, saleswoman, and pornographic film actress.

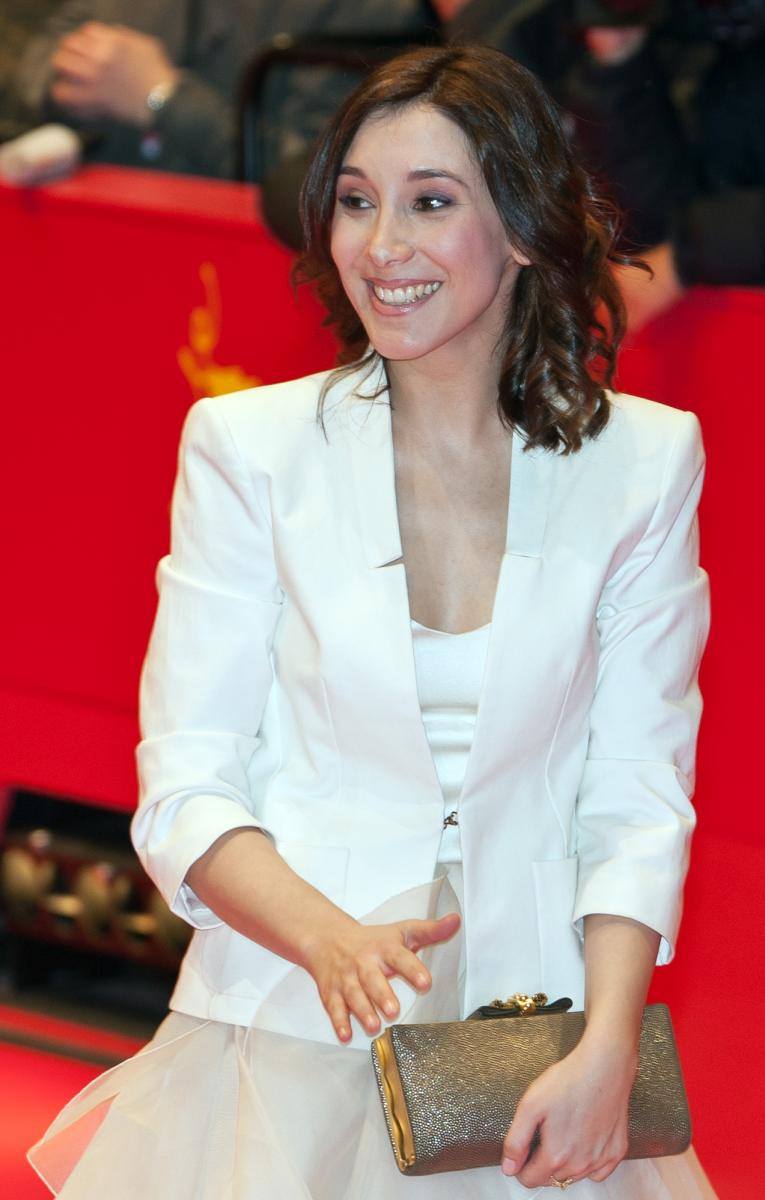
Kekilli at the 2012 Berlin International Film Festival

In 2001–2002, over a period of six months, Kekilli appeared in a number of pornographic films for various directors including Josef Baumberger and Harry S. Morgan.

In 2002, while at a shopping mall in Cologne, she was noticed by a casting director, who invited her to audition for a role in a film. She won the leading part in Head-On (German: Gegen die Wand) against a field of 350 other hopefuls. The film was released in 2004 and was a major success, receiving several prizes at film festivals. Filming proved strenuous for Kekilli personally, and she underwent an appendectomy during filming in Turkey.

Shortly after the release of Head-On, the German tabloid newspaper Bild made public Kekilli's earlier work in pornography. This led to a public sensation, and Kekilli's parents broke off all contact with her. She received the 2004 Bambi prize for "best shooting star" for her role in Head-On. During the televised acceptance speech, she tearfully complained that she was being subject to a "dreckige Hetzkampagne" ("dirty smear campaign") and "Medienvergewaltigung" ("media rape"). Bild-Zeitung was later reprimanded by the Deutscher Presserat (German Press Council) for the manner in which it covered the story.

Kekilli starred in the Turkish coup d'état film Home Coming (Eve Dönüş) (2006), playing the wife of a man who was unjustly imprisoned and tortured. The performance won her the Best Actress award at the 2006 Antalya Golden Orange Film Festival. Also that year, she played a Jewish woman on the way to the Auschwitz concentration camp in the 2006 film The Last Train (German: Der letzte Zug). In 2009, she played Umay, a young Turkish woman who leaves Istanbul to return to her family in Berlin, in When We Leave (Die Fremde). She was awarded the Lola for Best Actress in 2010 for her role. Kekilli was cast as Shae in HBO's Game of Thrones, an adaptation of George R. R. Martin's A Song of Ice and Fire novels.

In 2011, one year after first appearing in a supporting role in the long-running crime series Tatort, she became a permanent cast member as new investigator Sarah Brandt, working alongside chief investigator Klaus Borowski. She said that she was glad not to be playing a character of foreign descent, as she feels she has been typecast in the past. In 2017 she left the Tatort franchise, after 14 feature-length episodes, citing a need for change.

=== Activism ===
Kekilli supports the organization Terre des Femmes in its work against violence against women. In December 2006, at an anti-domestic violence event run by the Turkish newspaper Hürriyet in Berlin, she stated, in German, the equivalent of "I have experienced for myself that both physical and psychological abuse are regarded as normal in a Muslim family. Sadly, violence is part of the cultural heritage in Islam." In response, the Turkish consul general left the room.

In March 2015 at an International Women's Day event at the President of Germany's residence at Schloss Bellevue, Kekilli gave a speech on violence against women in the name of honour. The speech drew wide attention and praise in Germany for its empathic message. In May 2015, Friedrich Naumann Foundation named Kekilli "Author of Freedom" for the speech.

== Public image ==
In 2017, Kekilli blocked her Instagram account from being accessed in Turkey, saying that users from that country had sent a multitude of abusive and threatening messages. She denounced the senders as "bigoted, hypocrites and full of hate".

== Personal life ==
As of 2015, Kekilli lives in Hamburg.

Since citizenship in Germany is primarily established by Jus sanguinis rather than Jus soli, she originally held Turkish rather than German citizenship, and had to apply to the Turkish government when she sought a marriage license (for a planned marriage that ultimately did not take place).

In 2026 Kekilli married German photographer Andreas Daurer.

== Filmography ==
=== Film ===
Year	Title	Role	Notes
2002	Amateure intim (episode eleven)		Adult film
2004	Head-On (German: Gegen die Wand, Turkish: Duvara Karşı)	Sibel Güner	
2004	Kebab Connection	Italienerin	
2006	Winter Journey (German: Winterreise)	Leyla	
2006	Fay Grim	Concierge First Istanbul Hotel	
2006	The Last Train (German: Der letzte Zug)	Ruth Zilbermann	
2006	Home Coming (Turkish: Eve Dönüş)	Esma	
2009	Pihalla	Laura	
2010	When We Leave (German: Die Fremde, Turkish: Ayrılık)	Umay	
2011	What a Man	Nele	
2012	Die Männer der Emden	Salima Bey	
2019	Berlin, I Love You	Yasil	Segment: "Embassy"
2019	Deutschland ist... Heim		
2020	Fuchs im Bau	Tara Ketabi	
2022	Karanlık Gece	Sırma	
2025	Yunan	wife of the shepherd	Premiere at 75th Berlin International Film Festival in February.
TBD	7 Chats	Sarah	Post-production
TBD	Rostocken	Sibel	Announced

=== Television ===
Year	Title	Role	Notes
2010	Gier	Nadja Hartmann	2 episodes
2010	Homicide Unit Istanbul	Fatma Benli	1 episode
2010–2017	Tatort	Sarah Brandt	14 episodes
2011–2014	Game of Thrones	Shae	20 episodes
2015–2017	Paare	Patientin	4 episodes
2016	Inspector Borowski	Sarah Brandt	9 episodes
2017	Bruder: Schwarze Macht	Sibel	4 episodes
2017	Sesamstraße	Sibel	1 episode
2018	Bullets	Madina Taburova/Zamira Hoxha	10 episodes
2021	Meeresleuchten	Nina Baselau	TV film
2023	Freiheit ist das Einzigste, was zählt	Ulli	

== Awards ==
- 2004 Lola for Best Actress in Head-On
- 2004 Bambi for Best "Shooting Star" in Head-On
- 2006 Golden Orange Prize for Best Actress in Home Coming
- 2010 Lola for Best Actress in When We Leave
- 2010 Tribeca Prize for Best Actress in When We Leave

Awards and achievements
Preceded by Ursula Werner	German Film Award for Best Actress; 2010 for Die Fremde	Succeeded by incumbent
Preceded by Beste Bereket	Golden Orange Award for Best Actress; 2006 for Eve Dönüş	Succeeded by Özgü Namal
Preceded by Hannelore Elsner	German Film Award for Best Actress; 2004 for Gegen die Wand	Succeeded by Julia Jentsch
