= Massiv =

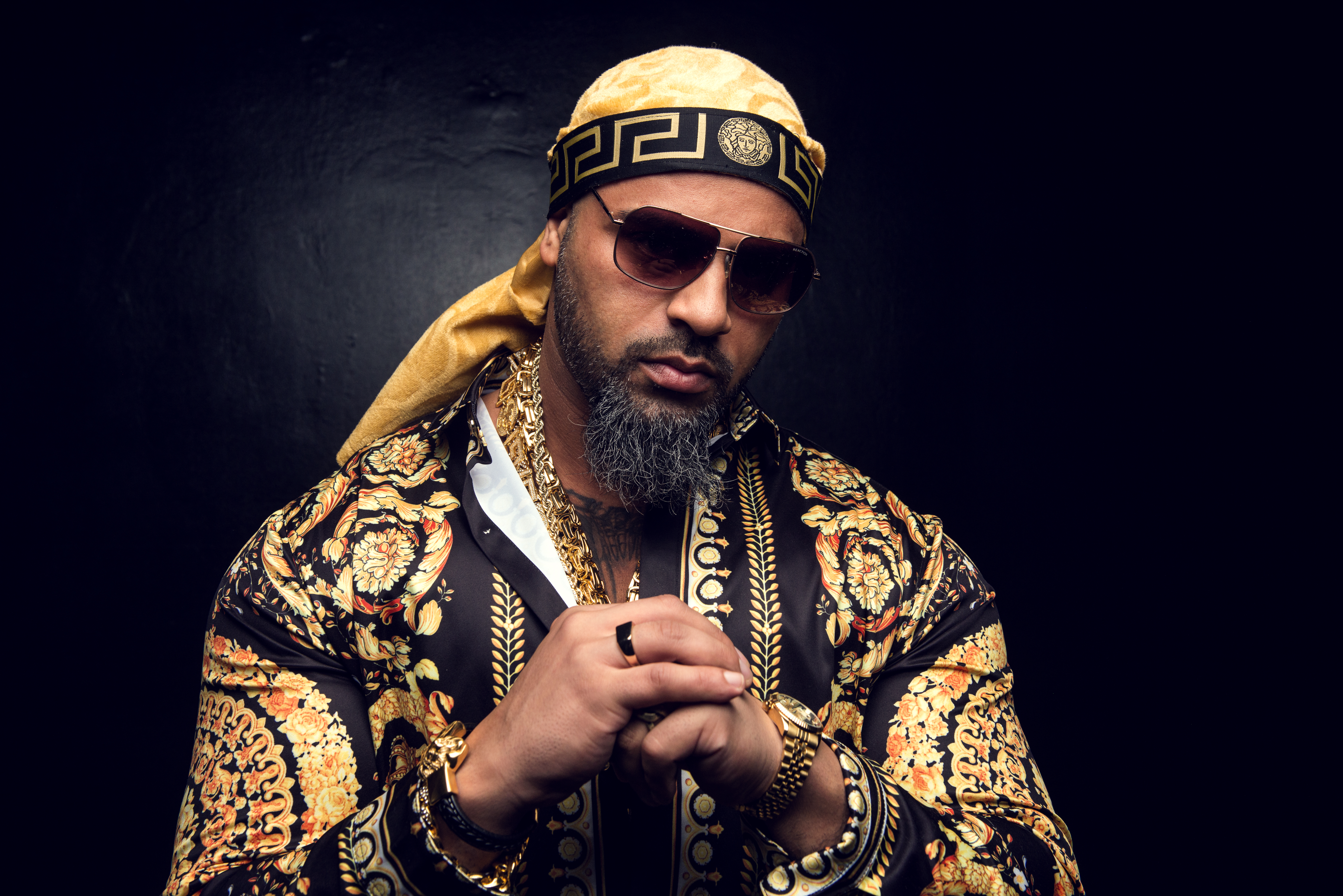
- Massiv in 2018

Background information
- Born: Wasiem Taha; 9 November 1982 (age 44); Pirmasens, Rheinland-Pfalz, West Germany
- Genres: Gangsta rap, hip hop
- Years active: 2004–present
- Labels: Horrorkore Entertainment (June–August 2006); Al Massiva (Sony BMG) (2007)
- Website: massiv65.de

Wasiem Taha (Arabic: وسيم طه), better known as Massiv (born 9 November 1982), is a German gangsta rapper, Twitch streamer, YouTuber, and actor. He began his career in 2004 under the stage name Pitbull, but changed it to Massiv (German for “massive”) in 2005 or 2006. Both stage names are based on his massive physique, which has become his signature. Since 2022, he has been streaming on the streaming platform Twitch under the name MASSIV_65, and later uploads the streams to his YouTube series called MASSIV ON AIR. His streams are a type of podcasts in which he discusses musical, cultural, and social topics. He is socially critical and primarily expresses criticism of Israel, which he believes disregards the lives of children in Palestine. Massiv is of Palestinian descent.

== Life and career ==
=== Early life ===
Taha had been influenced by hip-hop from an early age. He moved to Berlin in 2005, having struggled to find a job after not finishing school.

=== 2006: Early career and debut album ===
In July 2006 Taha's debut album, Blut gegen Blut, was released. On 22 August, Taha left the Horrorkore Entertainment label and signed to Sony BMG. Reasons for the separation were not mentioned.

The label has reportedly invested 250,000 euros into Taha's career. Frankfurt-based rapper Azad said in an interview that he was interested to sign Taha onto his label, Bozz Music.

== Shooting ==
In January 2008, Taha was purportedly shot three times by a masked man while talking on a cell phone near his car. Taha was subsequently hospitalized and lost a lot of blood, but was apparently able to leave the hospital later that same night. The Independent reported a rumor that the incident was a publicity stunt.

== Discography ==
=== Solo ===
Year	Title	Chart positions			Sales
Year	Title	GER	AUT	SWI	Sales
2004	Zahltag (aka Pitbull)				
2006	Horrorkore Mixtape Teil 1 (with MC Basstard)				
2006	Blut gegen Blut				
2007	Blut gegen Blut Re-Release	55	—	—	
2008	Ein Mann ein Wort	18	66	25	
2009	Meine Zeit	30	53	32	
2009	Der Ghettotraum in Handarbeit	100	—	—	
2011	Blut gegen Blut II	22	42	32	
2011	Eine Kugel reicht nicht	58	70	50	
2012	Solange mein Herz schlägt	18	43	22	
2013	Blut gegen Blut III	4	13	7	
2014	M10	3	14	6	
2015	Ein Mann ein Wort II	16	62	18	
2016	Raubtier	8	20	9	
2017	BGB X	8	22	26	
2018	M10 II	16	57	59	
2020	Lativ	15	62	—	
2023	Turbo Kanacke	—	—	—	
2026	BGB Reset	14	—	—	

=== Singles ===
Year	Title	Chart positions			Album
Year	Title	GER	AUT	SWI	Album
2007	"Wenn der Mond in mein Ghetto kracht"	44	72		
2008	"Weißt du wie es ist?" (samples "Sibylla" from Kingdom of Heaven)	29			
2008	"Es tut mir Leid"	84			
2009	"Hollyhood" / "MAS Techno"				
2018	"Hubba Bubba" (feat. Capital Bra)	43	65		

=== Free tracks and other releases ===
Year	Title	Info(s)
2006	"Weil es meine Strasse ist"	Released on the Juice CD #67.
2006	"Stellungnahme"	Diss vs. Manuellsen, Snaga & Pillath.
2006	"Nichts als mein Hemd an"	Der Spiegel Exclusive.
2007	"Von der Siedlung in das Blockhaus"	Released on the Juice CD #81.
2007	"Kein Ausweg" (with Shai)	
2007	"Die Antwort"	Diss vs. Manuellsen, Snaga & Pillath.
2007	"Opferfest"	Diss vs. Shok-Muzik.
2008	"Gangsta Shit" (with Hot Rod of G Unit)	Released on the Juice CD #84
2008	"Ohne euch wäre ich nichts"	
2009	"Meine Zeit"	
