= Burghart Klaußner =

German actor (born 1949)

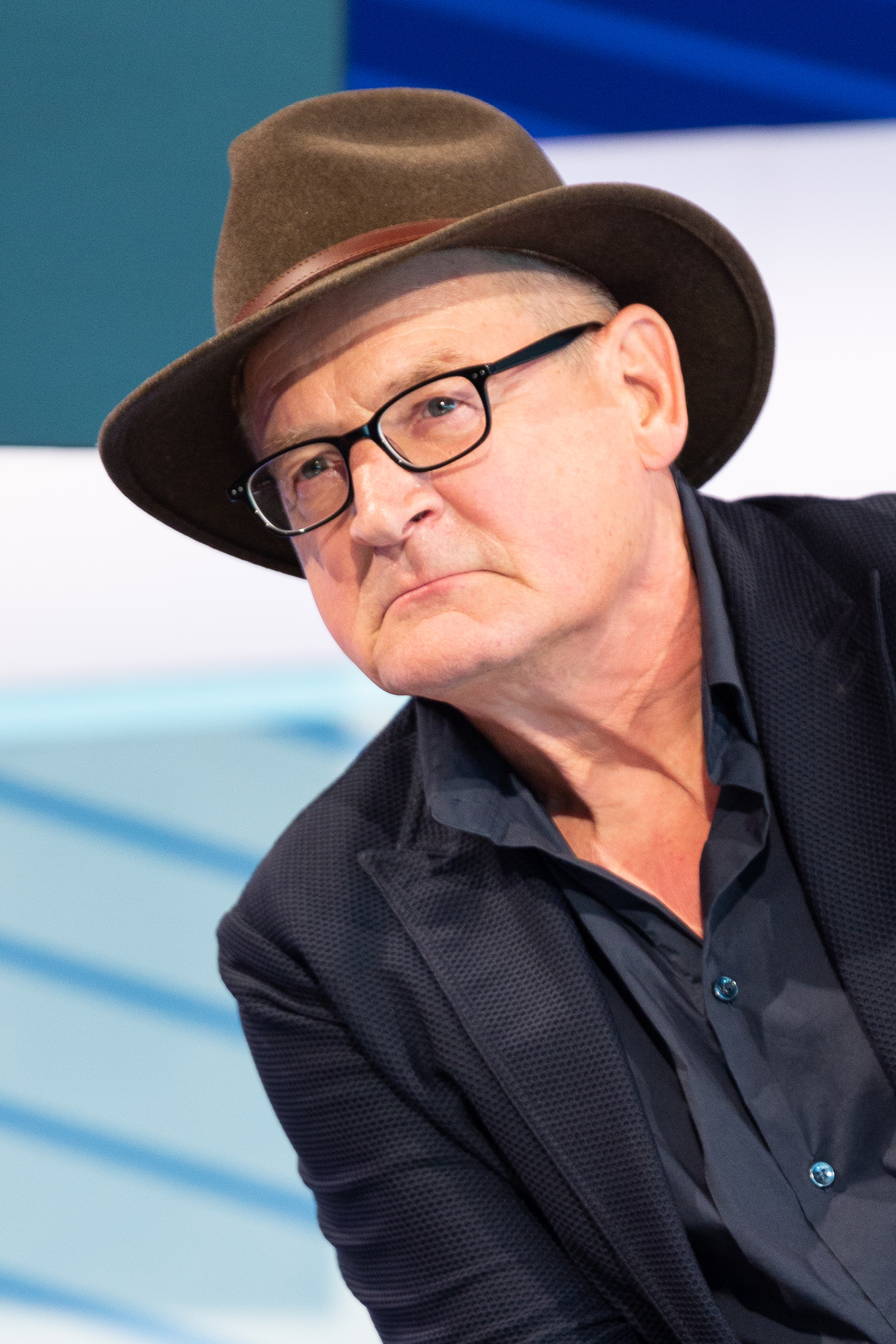
- Burghart Klaußner in 2018
- Born: 13 September 1949 (age 76); West Berlin, West Germany
- Occupation: Actor
- Years active: 1983–present

Burghart Klaußner (born 13 September 1949) is a German film actor. He received acting training at the Max-Reinhardt-Schule für Schauspiel in Berlin.

Klaußner had engagements at Maxim Gorki Theater in Berlin, Hamburger Kammerspiele and at the theaters in Cologne, Hamburg, Zürich, Bremen and Bochum. In Hamburg 2006, Klaußner also made his debut as a theater director. He has appeared in more than 90 films and television shows since 1983. He has also narrated many audiobooks, including Ian McEwan's Solar, and several Ferdinand von Schirach novels.

He is a member of the Deutsche Filmakademie and vice-president of the Freie Akademie der Künste in Hamburg since 2021.

== Selected filmography ==
- Ziemlich weit weg (1983)
- Love Is the Beginning of All Terror (1984)
- Das Rätsel der Sandbank (1987, TV film) – Davies
- Europa, abends (1989) – Reisebüro-Angestellter
- The State Chancellery (1989, TV film) – Björn Engholm
- Kollege Otto – Die Coop-Affäre (1991, TV film) – Referent
- The Terrible Threesome (1991) – House Owner
- Child's Play (1992) – Father
- Shadow Boxer (1992) – Maler
- Just a Matter of Duty (1993) – Werner Kraengel
- La lumière des étoiles mortes (1994) – Capitaine Krantz
- Ein falscher Schritt (1995) – Eugen Himmelreiter
- And Nobody Weeps for Me (1996) – Herr Leer
- The Superwife (1996) – Rudi Fährenberg
- Rossini (1997) – Tabatier
- 23 (1998) – Weber
- Crazy (2000) – Klaus Lebert, Benjamins Vater
- Good Bye Lenin! (2003) – Alex' Vater
- Hamlet_X (2003) – Polonius
- The Edukators (2004) – Hardenberg
- Ein Goldfisch unter Haien (2004) – Rupert
- Requiem (2006) – Karl Klingler
- Der Mann von der Botschaft (2006) – Herbert Neumann
- Cutting Edge (2007) – Prof. Udo Keller
- Yella (2007) – Dr. Gunthen
- An die Grenze (2007, TV film) – Professor Karow
- The Reader (2008) – Judge
- Mediator (2008) – Mediator
- Age and Beauty (2009) – Justus Lenz
- The White Ribbon (2009) – The Pastor
- The Silence (2010) – Krischan Mittich
- Life Is Too Long (2010)
- Young Goethe in Love (2010) – Lottes Vater
- Lessons of a Dream (2011) – Gustav Merfeld
- Invasion (2012) – Josef
- The Zigzag Kid (2012) – Felix
- Hotel Adlon: A Family Saga (2013, TV miniseries) – Lorenz Adlon
- Night Train to Lisbon (2013) – Judge Prado
- George (2013, TV film) – Helmut Maurer
- Inbetween Worlds (2014) – Oberst Haar
- Diplomacy (2014) – Hauptmann Werner Ebernach
- 13 Minutes (2015) – Arthur Nebe
- The People vs. Fritz Bauer (2015) – Fritz Bauer
- Bridge of Spies (2015) – Harald Ott
- The Lion Woman (2016) – Johannes Joachim
- The Verdict (2016, TV film) – Vorsitzender Richter
- Freddy/Eddy (2016) – Dr. Weiss
- The Crown (2017, TV series) – Kurt Hahn
- Das schweigende Klassenzimmer (2018) – Volksbildungsminister Lange
- Brecht (2019) – Bertolt Brecht

== Writings ==
- Klaußner, Burghart (2018). Vor dem Anfang (in German). Köln: Verlag Kiepenheuer & Witsch. ISBN 978-3-462-05196-4. OCLC 1032351637.
