= Feo Aladag =

Austrian actress, film director and screenwriter

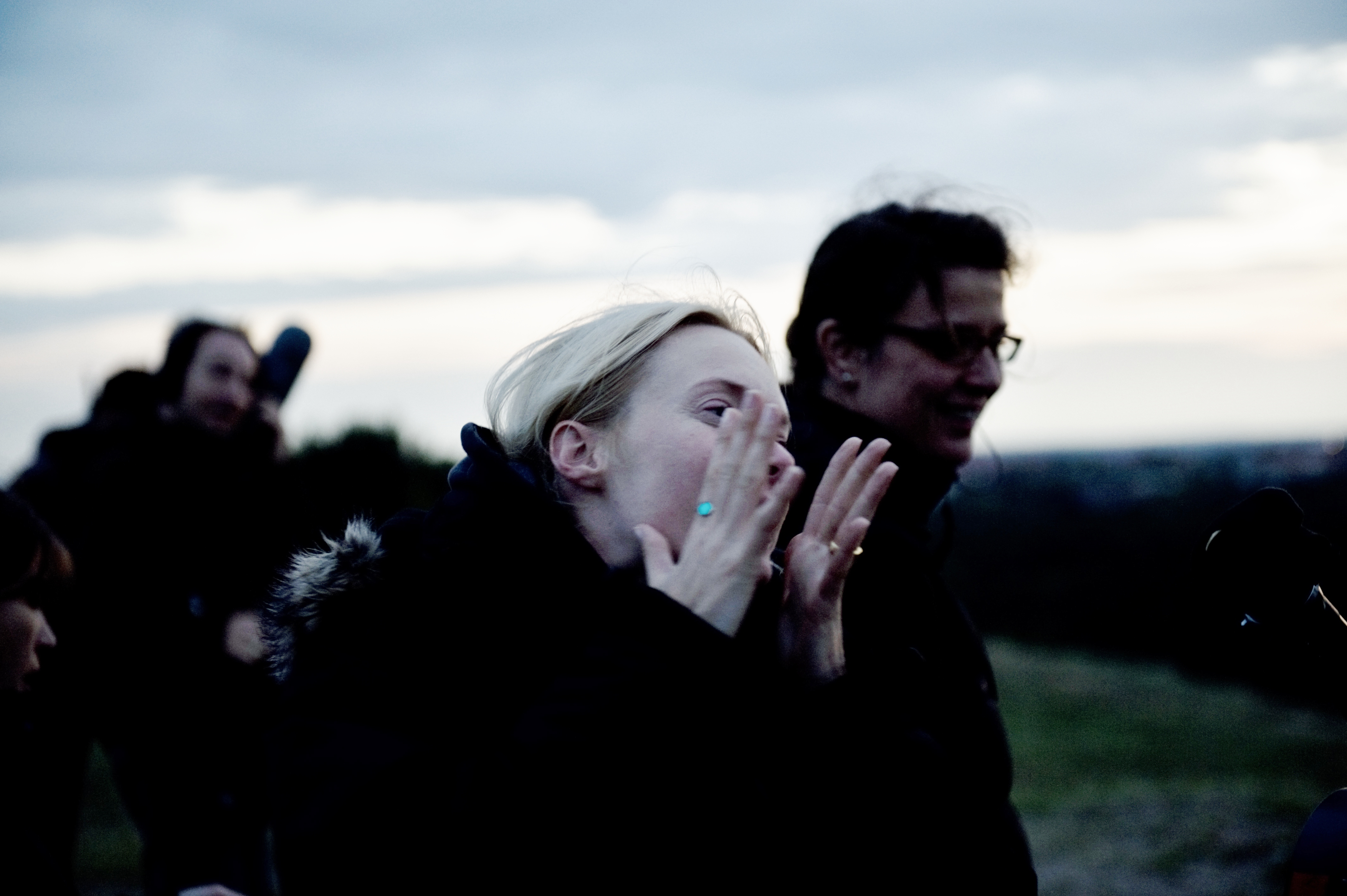
- Aladag on set
- Born: Feodora Schenk; 13 January 1972 (age 54); Vienna, Austria
- Occupations: Film director, film actor, screenwriter, producer
- Years active: 1995–present

Feo Aladag is an Austrian film director, screenwriter, producer, and actress. She is the producer, executive producer, director and writer of the multi-awarded feature films “When we leave”, “Inbetween Worlds” and “Alone – A Family story” (a.k.a. “The Boy who wants to live”). She runs the production house Independent Artists GmbH, based in Berlin, Germany.

== Early life and acting ==
Aladag was born as Feodora Schenk in 1972 and grew up in Vienna, Austria; Her mother is the Swiss born Jewish painter Gina Schenk-Roche, her deceased father was Sebastian Schenk, architect, son of Princess Feodora (Feo) Auersperg, née Countess Solms-Baruth. Aladag is the great granddaughter of Prinz Friedrich of Solms-Baruth III, who is listed as one of the Resistance fighters against Nazism.

She began her film career as an actress, completing her training in London and Vienna from 1990–1995. While studying acting she also completed a PhD in Psychology and Communication Science in 2000.

Before she started writing, producing, and directing, she worked as an actress and journalist for more than a decade. She acted in numerous film and television productions while attending master-classes and directing seminars at the European Film Academy and the German Film and Television Academy. From 2003 to 2005 she attended the directing master class of Michael Radford and Mike Figgis at the European Film Academy. From 2004 to 2005 she attended the directing seminars of Stephen Frears, Mike Leigh, Fernando Solanas, Bertrand Tavernier and Peter Lilienthal at the German Film and Television Academy Berlin. During this time she also maintained a career as a successful scriptwriter and commercial film director; directing various spots for Amnesty International, Ford, Wrigley´s and others and writing scripts for the German television series Tatort.

== Personal life ==
In 2002 Aladag married fellow director Züli Aladağ. They divorced in 2012. Feo Aladag lives in Berlin with her four children. She speaks English, French and German and writes in German and English.

== When We Leave ==
Aladag's directorial debut When We Leave had its world premiere at the 60th Berlin International Film Festival in 2010, where it won the Europa Cinema Label Award. It went on to win the World Narrative Feature Competition at the 2010 Tribeca Film Festival, as well as the German Film Award for Best Actress for Sibel Kekilli, and the for Best Film in Bronze.

The film's festival run included several international film festivals, where it won some "best of" and audience awards at festivals like the São Paulo International Film Festival, the Fort Lauderdale Film Festival and the Angers European First Film Festival in France.

When We Leave was selected as the German entry for the Best Foreign Language Film at the 83rd Academy Awards.

== Inbetween Worlds ==
In June 2013, Independent Artists wrapped their new feature film Inbetween Worlds, which was secretly filmed on location in the region of Mazar-i-Sharif and Kunduz in Afghanistan. Inbetween Worlds had its premiere at the competition section of the 64th Berlin International Film Festival in 2014 and was nominated for the German Directors Award Metropolis and the VGF Producers Newcomers Award in 2014.

== Independent Artists GmbH ==
In 2005 Aladag founded Independent Artists GmbH. Based in Berlin, Germany, Independent Artists was the production company behind When We Leave and Inbetween Worlds, as well as Aladag's upcoming projects.
