= Christina Gerhardt =

Christina Gerhardt is an author, academic and journalist. She has written on a range of subjects, namely the Environmental Humanities. She has been the Currie C. and Thomas A. Barron Visiting Professor of Environment and the Humanities at the High Meadows Environmental Institute at Princeton University, and held visiting positions at Harvard University, the Free University of Berlin, Columbia University and University of California at Berkeley, where she taught previously and is a permanent Senior Fellow. She has been awarded grants by the Fulbright Commission, the DAAD, the National Endowment for the Humanities, and the Newberry Library. Her environmental journalism has been published (under Tina Gerhardt) in The Guardian, The Nation, Grist, Orion and Sierra Magazine, among other venues (see below).

== Writing ==
Gerhardt has made contributions to a number of fields, notably the environmental humanities.

=== Environmental Humanities ===
Professor Gerhardt is author of Sea Change: An Atlas of Islands in a Rising Ocean (University of California Press, 2023), which the New Scientist called one of the "best popular science books of 2023" and the LA Times called "a work of art." Sea Change received the 2025 ASLE Book Award for Ecocriticism, the 2024 California Book Award Silver Medal for Contribution to Publishing, the 2024 Nautilus Award Silver Medal in the category Ecology and Environment and the 2023 Society for Literature, Science and the Arts (SLSA) Michelle Kendrick Award. She is a regular commentator on television and radio and has been featured on the BBC's World Service, CBC's The Current and NPR's 1A, among other television and radio programs and podcasts.

She is also Editor-in-Chief of ISLE: Interdisciplinary Studies in Literature and Environment, the quarterly journal of the Association for the Study of Literature and Environment (ASLE), published by Oxford University Press. Gerhardt has written about walking and experiential learning, civic engagement and citizen science; about human-animal-environment entanglement; about petro-cultures and petro-landscapes, e.g. plastic and the Pacific; about sea level rise and islands; and about future shorelines. She was also active in the public humanities, having created the High Water Line: Honolulu and the High Water Line: New Jersey. In them, she led walking tours, with both classes and the public, revealing the past histories of urban landscapes, considering how the present-day environment came to be shaped, and imagining possible futures.

== Awards ==
- DAAD Faculty Research Award
- Fulbright Commission - Junior Research Grant

== Selected publications ==
=== Books ===
- Sea Change: An Atlas of Islands in a Rising Ocean, 2023.
- Atlas de las Futuras Islas Sumergidas, 2024.
- Screening the Red Army Faction: Historical and Cultural Memory, 2018. pb 2020.

=== Edited volumes ===
- The Bloomsbury Handbook to Literature and Environmental Justice. 2028. (Under contract.)
- Celluloid Revolt: German Screen Cultures and the Long 1968. 2019
- 1968 and Global Cinema. 2018

=== Special Issues ===
- The Environmental Humanities in Practice, Co-Editor, with Cajetan Iheka, Special Topic issue of the PMLA (journal), 2027
- The Authoritarian Personality, Co-Editor, with Robyn Marasco and Kirk Wetters, special issue of Polity, 2022
- 1968 and West German Cinema, Editor, special issue of The Sixties: A Journal of History, Politics and Culture, 2017
- Adorno and Ethics, Editor, special issue of New German Critique, 2006

=== Environmental Humanities - Select Articles and Book Chapters ===
- "Ocean Temperature and Climate Change." Environmental Justice Encyclopedia. Edited by Dorceta Taylor. Sage Publications, 2026.
- "Climate Change, the Caribbean and Literature" in Teaching the Literature of Climate Change. Edited by Debby Rosenthal. MLA Series: Options for Teaching, 2024.
- "Postcolonial Cartographies, Environmental Humanities and Sea Level Rise" in Teaching Postcolonial Environmental Literature and Media. Edited by Cajetan Iheka. MLA Series: Options for Teaching, 2021. pp. 119–128.
- "Walking, We Ask Questions: Experiential Learning and Environmental Humanities." in Environment and Pedagogy in Higher Education. Edited by Lucie Viakinnou-Brinson. Lexington Books, 2018. pp. 133–151.
