= Preis der deutschen Filmkritik =

German film award

The Preis der deutschen Filmkritik is a prize given by the German Film Critics Association, awarded to the best German films of the past year. The Preis der deutschen Filmkritik is the only German film prize issued exclusively by film critics. The announcement and award ceremony takes place at the Berlinale, and is conducted in cooperation with Moviepilot. The prizes for the best experimental film and for the best short film are awarded at the Media & Art Festival in Osnabrück and at the Dresden Film Festival, respectively. The Preis der deutschen Filmkritik was awarded irregularly from 1956 to 1963 in varying categories. From 1968, the prize was awarded regularly in the areas of feature (Spielfilm), short film (Kurzfilm) and documentary film (Dokumentarfilm). Since 2000, prizes are given in eleven categories

- Bester Spielfilm – Best Feature Film
- Bestes Spielfilmdebüt – Best Feature Film Debut
- Bester Kinderfilm- Best Children's Film
- Beste Darstellerin – Best Actress
- Bester Darsteller – Best Actor
- Bester Dokumentarfilm – Best Documentary Film
- Bestes Drehbuch – Best Screenplay
- Beste Kamera – Best Cinematography
- Beste Musik – Best Music
- Bester Schnitt – Best Editing
- Bester Experimentalfilm – Best Experimental Film
- Bester Kurzfilm – Best Short Film

Since 2006, an additional Special Prize has been awarded.

== Winners ==
The year indicates the year when the film was first shown. The prize is always awarded the following year.

=== 2004 ===
- Bester Spielfilm: The Edukators by Hans Weingartner
- Bestes Spielfilmdebüt: Schultze Gets the Blues by Michael Schorr
- Beste Darstellerin: Julia Jentsch
- Bester Darsteller: August Diehl
- Bester Dokumentarfilm: Die Spielwütigen by Andres Veiel
- Bestes Drehbuch: Angela Schanelec for Marseille
- Beste Kamera: Manuel Mack for Gun-Shy
- Beste Musik: Andreas Grimm for Der Wixxer
- Bester Schnitt: Mona Bräuer for Hell on Wheels
- Bester Experimentalfilm: Zygose by Arndt Stepper and Gonzalo Arilla
- Bester Kurzfilm: Living a Beautiful Life by Corinna Schnitt

=== 2005 ===
- Bester Spielfilm: Ghosts by Christian Petzold
- Bestes Spielfilmdebüt: Netto by Robert Thalheim
- Beste Darstellerin: Julia Jentsch
- Bester Darsteller: Axel Prahl
- Bester Dokumentarfilm: Into Great Silence by Philip Gröning
- Bestes Drehbuch: Holger Franke and Dani Levy for Alles auf Zucker!
- Beste Kamera: Hans-Günther Bücking for Schneeland
- Beste Musik: Hans Zimmer and Nick Glennie-Smith for The Little Polar Bear
- Bester Schnitt: Patricia Rommel for Off Beat
- Bester Experimentalfilm: You Killed the Undergroundfilm or The Real Meaning of Kunst bleibt... bleibt von Wilhelm Hein
- Bester Kurzfilm: Blackout by Maximilian Erlenwein

=== 2006 ===
- Bester Spielfilm: Requiem by Hans-Christian Schmid
- Bestes Spielfilmdebüt: The Lives of Others by Florian Henckel von Donnersmarck
- Beste Darstellerin: Sandra Hüller in Requiem
- Bester Darsteller: Ulrich Mühe in The Lives of Others
- Bester Dokumentarfilm: Behind the Couch by Veit Helmer, and Deutschland. Ein Sommermärchen by Sönke Wortmann
- Bestes Drehbuch: Wolfgang Kohlhaase by Summer in Berlin
- Beste Kamera: Hagen Bogdanski for The Lives of Others
- Beste Musik: Bert Wrede for Tough Enough
- Bester Schnitt: Patricia Rommel for The Lives of Others
- Bester Experimentalfilm: Daumenlutscherin by Ute Ströer
- Bester Kurzfilm: Detektive by Andreas Goldstein
- Spezialpreis: Brinkmann's Wrath by Harald Bergmann

=== 2007 ===
- Bester Spielfilm: Yella, by Christian Petzold
- Bestes Spielfilmdebüt: The Unpolished, by Pia Marais
- Beste Darstellerin: Maren Kroymann in Hounded
- Bester Darsteller: Ulrich Noethen in My Führer – The Really Truest Truth about Adolf Hitler
- Bester Dokumentarfilm: Prater, by Ulrike Ottinger
- Bestes Drehbuch: Matthias Pacht and Alex Buresch for Life Actually
- Beste Kamera: Hans Fromm for Yella
- Beste Musik: Dieter Schleip for Die Hochstapler
- Bester Schnitt: Andrew Bird for The Edge of Heaven
- Bester Experimentalfilm: Wie ich ein freier Reisebegleiter wurde, by Jan Peters
- Bester Kurzfilm: Illusion, by Burhan Qurbani
- Spezialpreis: The Heart Is a Dark Forest, by Nicolette Krebitz (director) and Bella Halben (camera)

=== 2008 ===
- Bester Spielfilm: Jerichow by Christian Petzold
- Bestes Spielfilmdebüt: Nacht vor Augen by Brigitte Bertele
- Beste Darstellerin: Karoline Herfurth in A Year Ago in Winter
- Bester Darsteller: Elmar Wepper in Cherry Blossoms
- Bester Dokumentarfilm: Holunderblüte by Volker Koepp
- Bestes Drehbuch: Philipp Stölzl, Christoph Silber, Rupert Henning and Johannes Naber for North Face
- Beste Kamera: Kolja Brandt for North Face
- Beste Musik: Niki Reiser for A Year Ago in Winter
- Bester Schnitt: Andreas Wodraschke for Dr. Alemán
- Bester Experimentalfilm: Falsche Freunde by Sylvia Schedelbauer
- Bester Kurzfilm: Das heimliche Geräusch by Michael Watzke
- Spezialpreis: Klaas Akkermann (film promotion)

=== 2009 ===
- Bester Spielfilm: The White Ribbon by Michael Haneke
- Bestes Spielfilmdebüt: Salami Aleikum by Ali Samadi Ahadi
- Beste Darstellerin: Birgit Minichmayr in Everyone Else
- Bester Darsteller: Burghart Klaußner in The White Ribbon
- Bester Dokumentarfilm: Achterbahn by Peter Dörfler
- Bestes Drehbuch: Michael Haneke for The White Ribbon
- Beste Kamera: Christian Berge for The White Ribbon
- Beste Musik: Fabian Römer for The Door
- Bester Schnitt: Hansjörg Weißbrich for Storm
- Bester Experimentalfilm: Painting Paradise by Barbara Hlali
- Bester Kurzfilm: Heimspiel by Bogdana Vera Lorenz
- Ehrenpreis: Ron Holloway

=== 2010 ===
- Bester Spielfilm: When We Leave by Feo Aladağ
- Bestes Spielfilmdebüt: When We Leave by Feo Aladağ
- Beste Darstellerin: Sibel Kekilli in When We Leave, and Sophie Rois in Three
- Bester Darsteller: Devid Striesow in Three
- Bester Dokumentarfilm: Im Haus meines Vaters sind viele Wohnungen by Hajo Schomerus
- Bestes Drehbuch: Feo Aladağ for When We Leave
- Beste Kamera: Judith Kaufmann for When We Leave
- Beste Musik: Stéphane Moucha & Max Richter for When We Leave, and Christoph M. Kaiser & Julian Maas for The Coming Days
- Bester Schnitt: Andrea Mertens for When We Leave
- Bester Experimentalfilm: Nacht um Olympia by Timo Schierhorn
- Bester Kurzfilm: Go Bash by Stefan Prehn and Stefan Eckel
- Ehrenpreis: Heinz Badewitz

=== 2011 ===
- Bester Spielfilm: Stopped on Track by Andreas Dresen
- Bestes Spielfilmdebüt: Almanya: Welcome to Germany by Yasemin Şamdereli
- Beste Darstellerin: Sandra Hüller in Above Us Only Sky
- Bester Darsteller: Milan Peschel in Stopped on Track
- Bester Dokumentarfilm: Pina by Wim Wenders
- Bestes Drehbuch: Yasemin und Nesrin Şamdereli for Almanya: Welcome to Germany
- Beste Kamera: Daniela Knapp for The Poll Diaries
- Beste Musik: Ingo Ludwig Frenzel for Lollipop Monster, ex aequo Benedikt Schiefer for The City Below
- Bester Schnitt: Toni Froschhammer for Pina
- Bester Experimentalfilm: Bardzo by Gerhard Funk
- Ehrenpreis: Darius Ghanai (title designer)

=== 2012 ===
- Bester Spielfilm: Barbara by Christian Petzold
- Bestes Spielfilmdebüt: A Coffee in Berlin by Jan-Ole Gerster
- Beste Darstellerin: Alina Levshin in Combat Girls
- Bester Darsteller: Lars Eidinger in Home for the Weekend
- Bester Dokumentarfilm: Das Ding am Deich by Antje Hubert
- Bester Kinderfilm: Tom und Hacke by Norbert Lechner
- Bestes Drehbuch: Bernd Lange for Home for the Weekend
- Beste Kamera: Jakub Bejnarowicz for The River Used to Be a Man
- Beste Musik: The Major Minors and Cherilyn MacNeil for A Coffee in Berlin
- Bester Schnitt: Bettina Böhler for Barbara
- Bester Kurzfilm: Die Schaukel des Sargmachers by Elmar Imanov
- Ehrenpreis: Christel and Hans Strobel for Verdienste on the German Kinderfilm
- Innovationspreis: Fred Kelemen for herausragende Bildgestaltung in The Turin Horse

=== 2013 ===
- Bester Spielfilm: Home from Home by Edgar Reitz
- Bestes Spielfilmdebüt: Nothing Bad Can Happen by Katrin Gebbe
- Beste Darstellerin: Antonia Lingemann in Bastard by Carsten Unger
- Bester Darsteller: Sascha Alexander Gersak in Nothing Bad Can Happen, and Murat Kurnaz in 5 Jahre Leben
- Bester Dokumentarfilm: Der Banker: Master of the Universe by Marc Bauder
- Bester Kinderfilm: Sputnik by Markus Dietrich
- Bestes Drehbuch: Frauke Finsterwalder and Christian Kracht for Finsterworld
- Beste Kamera: Gernot Roll for Home from Home
- Beste Musik: Martin Todsharow for Sources of Life
- Bester Schnitt: Anne Fabini for Houston by Bastian Günther
- Bester Experimentalfilm: Ein Gespenst geht um in Europa by Julian Radlmaier
- Bester Kurzfilm: Wie ist die Welt so stille by Susann Maria Hempel
- Ehrenpreis: Wilhelm Hein for his Engagement for the Undergroundkino and the independent and experimental Film

=== 2014 ===
- Bester Spielfilm: Age of Cannibals by Johannes Naber
- Bestes Spielfilmdebüt: Fräulein Else by Anna Martinetz
- Beste Darstellerin: Liv Lisa Fries in Zurich and The Dam
- Bester Darsteller: Sebastian Blomberg in Age of Cannibals
- Bester Dokumentarfilm: Deutschboden by André Schäfer
- Bester Kinderfilm: The Pasta Detectives by Neele Vollmar
- Bestes Drehbuch: Stefan Weigl for Age of Cannibals
- Beste Kamera: Philip Gröning for The Police Officer's Wife
- Beste Musik: Sven Rossenbach and Florian van Volxem for Beloved Sisters
- Bester Schnitt: Claudia Wolscht for Beloved Sisters
- Bester Experimentalfilm: Femminielli by Nino Pezzella
- Bester Kurzfilm: Raimund – Ein Jahr davor by Hans-Dieter Grabe
- Ehrenpreis: Erika and Ulrich Gregor
- Sonderpreis der Dokumentarfilmjury: Heinz Emigholz for his work Photographie und jenseits

=== 2015 ===
- Bester Spielfilm: The People vs. Fritz Bauer by Lars Kraume
- Bestes Spielfilmdebüt: Verfehlung by Gerd Schneider
- Beste Darstellerin: Laura Tonke in Hedi Schneider Is Stuck
- Bester Darsteller: Burghart Klaußner in The People vs. Fritz Bauer
- Bester Dokumentarfilm: Das Gelände by Martin Gressmann
- Bester Kinderfilm: Hördur by Ekrem Ergün
- Bestes Drehbuch: Dietrich Brüggemann for Heil
- Beste Kamera: Sturla Brandth Grøvlen for Victoria
- Beste Musik: Nils Frahm for Victoria
- Bester Schnitt: Vincent Assmann for Heil
- Bester Experimentalfilm: Schicht by Alexandra Gerbaulet
- Bester Kurzfilm: Stadt der Elefanten by Marko Mijatovic
- Ehrenpreis: Joachim von Mengershausen

=== 2016 ===
- Bester Spielfilm: Toni Erdmann by Maren Ade
- Bestes Spielfilmdebüt: Fado by Jonas Rothlaender
- Beste Darstellerin: Lilith Stangenberg in Wild
- Bester Darsteller: Josef Hader in Stefan Zweig: Farewell to Europe
- Bester Dokumentarfilm: Chamissos Schatten by Ulrike Ottinger
- Bester Kinderfilm: At Eye Level by Evi Goldbrunner and Joachim Dollhopf
- Bestes Drehbuch: Maren Ade for Toni Erdmann
- Beste Kamera: Wolfgang Thaler for Stefan Zweig: Farewell to Europe
- Beste Musik: Levin Kärcher and Alula Araya for Beti und Amare
- Bester Schnitt: Heike Parplies for Toni Erdmann
- Bester Experimentalfilm: Havarie by Philip Scheffner
- Bester Kurzfilm: Telefon Santrali by Sarah Drath
- Ehrenpreis: Helke Misselwitz

=== 2017 ===
- Bester Spielfilm: Western by Valeska Grisebach
- Bestest Spielfilmdebüt: Selbstkritik by Julian Radlmaier
- Bester Kinderfilm: Nur ein Tag by Martin Baltscheits
- Beste Darstellerin: Clara Schramm in Naomi Achternbusch
- Bester Darsteller: Meinhard Neumann in Western
- Bester Dokumentarfilm: Happy by Carolin Genreith
- Bestest Drehbuch: Heinz Emigholz, Zohar Rubinstein for Streetscapes
- Beste Kamera: Reinhold Vorschneider in Der traumhafte Weg
- Beste Musik: Ricardo Villalobos, Sonja Moonear, Athaassios Christos Macias, Roman Flügel, David Moufang, Romuald Karmakar for Denk ich an Deutschland in der Nacht
- Bester Schnitt: Angela Schanelec, Maja Tennstedt for Der traumhafte Weg
- Bester Experimentalfilm: Lass den Sommer nie wieder kommen by Alexandre Koberidze
- Bester Kurzfilm: Final Stage by Nicolaas Schmidt
