= The Edukators =

2004 Austrian-German film by Hans Weingartner

- German film poster
- German: Die fetten Jahre sind vorbei (Note: The original German title translates literally as "the fat years are over". Die fetten Jahre is a German expression originating from the life of Joseph as found in the Luther Bible, a reference to the scarcity that will follow his "fat days." The official translation of the statement as used in the film and the subtitle to the English-language release was "Your days of plenty are numbered".)
- Directed by: Hans Weingartner
- Written by: Katharina Held; Hans Weingartner
- Produced by: Antonin Svoboda; Hans Weingartner
- Starring: Daniel Brühl; Julia Jentsch; Stipe Erceg; Burghart Klaußner
- Cinematography: Daniela Knapp; Matthias Schellenberg
- Edited by: Dirk Oetelshoven; Andreas Wodraschke
- Music by: Andreas Wodraschke
- Production companies: y3film; coop99
- Distributed by: Celluloid Dreams
- Release dates: 17 May 2004 (Cannes Film Festival); 25 November 2004 (Germany); 26 November 2004 (Austria)
- Running time: 127 minutes
- Countries: Austria; Germany
- Language: German
- Box office: US$8.1 million

The Edukators (German: Die fetten Jahre sind vorbei) is a 2004 crime drama film directed by the Austrian director Hans Weingartner. A co-production between Germany and Austria, it stars Daniel Brühl, Stipe Erceg, and Julia Jentsch as three young, anti-capitalist Berlin activists involved in a love triangle. The friends, calling themselves "the Edukators", (Note: "Edukators" is a made-up word used in the English dub. In the German version of the film, the three call themselves the Erziehungsberechtigten, which roughly translates as "The Guardians.") invade upper-class houses, rearrange the furniture, and leave notes identifying themselves. Weingartner, a former activist, wrote the film based on his experiences and chose to use nonviolent characters. The film, shot in Berlin and Austria with digital hand-held cameras, was made on a low budget which Weingartner said kept the focus on the acting.

First shown at the Cannes Film Festival on 17 May 2004 and released in its home countries later that year, The Edukators was praised by critics and audiences. It grossed more than US$8 million worldwide and received a number of awards and nominations. It did, however, receive criticism mainly for its political statements and also for its long running time. It has become a cult film, part of a "German New Wave", and the inspiration for real-life actions and a 2013 stage adaptation in Brazil.

== Plot ==
Set in 2004, the film revolves around three young anti-capitalist activists in Berlin's city centre: Jule (Julia Jentsch), her boyfriend Peter (Stipe Erceg) and his best friend Jan (Daniel Brühl). Jule is a waitress struggling to pay off a €100,000 debt she incurred a year ago when she crashed into a Mercedes-Benz S-Class belonging to a wealthy businessman named Hardenberg (Burghart Klaußner). After her eviction for non-payment of rent, she moves in with Peter and Jan, who are often out all night. While Peter is in Barcelona, Jan tells Jule that he and Peter spend their nights "educating" upper-class people by breaking into their houses, moving furniture around and leaving notes saying "die fetten Jahre sind vorbei" ("the days of plenty are over") or "Sie haben zu viel Geld" ("you have too much money").

After hearing this, Jule convinces the reluctant Jan to break into Hardenberg's home in the affluent Berlin suburb of Zehlendorf while he is away on business. During the break-in, the thrill of the moment entices them to kiss before Jan leaves Jule alone for a few minutes; he does not want to destroy his friendship with Peter. As she wanders around outside Jule accidentally sets off the house's floodlights, and they quickly leave.

When Peter returns the next day, Jan and Jule do not tell him about their activities the night before. Jule realises that her mobile phone is gone, and she and Jan leave later that night to look for it in the house. After she finds it, Hardenberg walks in the door and struggles with Jule when he recognises her. Hearing them, Jan comes downstairs and knocks Hardenberg unconscious with a flashlight. Not knowing what to do, they call Peter and he comes to their aid.

The three cannot decide what to do with Hardenberg and take him to a remote, rarely used cabin belonging to Jule's uncle in the Tyrolean Austrian Alps near Jenbach, overlooking Achensee. As they try to decide how to deal with their hostage, they learn that Hardenberg was a radical himself during the 1960s. A leader of the Socialist German Student Union, he was a good friend of Rudi Dutschke before marrying, getting a good job and abandoning his ideals.

As the story progresses, political ideology and the characters' relationships become the main issues. Peter and Jan temporarily fall out over Jan's developing romance with Jule, and Hardenberg seems to regain some of his former self.

The trio finally decides that kidnapping Hardenberg was wrong and take him back to his house to let him go. As they prepare to leave, Hardenberg gives Jule a letter forgiving her debt and promising not to involve the police. The film ends with Peter, Jan and Jule asleep in the same bed as a group of heavily armed police (Spezialeinsatzkommando) (Note: Spezialeinsatzkommando are special police forces that are essentially the German equivalent of American SWAT teams.) gather outside their flat and knock on the door. Jule wakes up when she hears a knock, and the police force their way into the almost-empty flat. Apparently in Barcelona, Jule opens the door to a hotel maid who wishes to clean their room. In the Berlin apartment, the police find a note: "Manche Menschen ändern sich nie" ("some people never change"). In the original German version, the Edukators set off in Hardenberg's boat in the Mediterranean, presumably to disrupt the island signal towers supplying most television programming to Western Europe. (Note: Earlier in the film Jan proposes disrupting the towers to Peter and Jule, as he believes that Europe's youth watches too much television, which keeps them from engaging in revolutionary activities.)

== Production ==
=== Development and characters ===
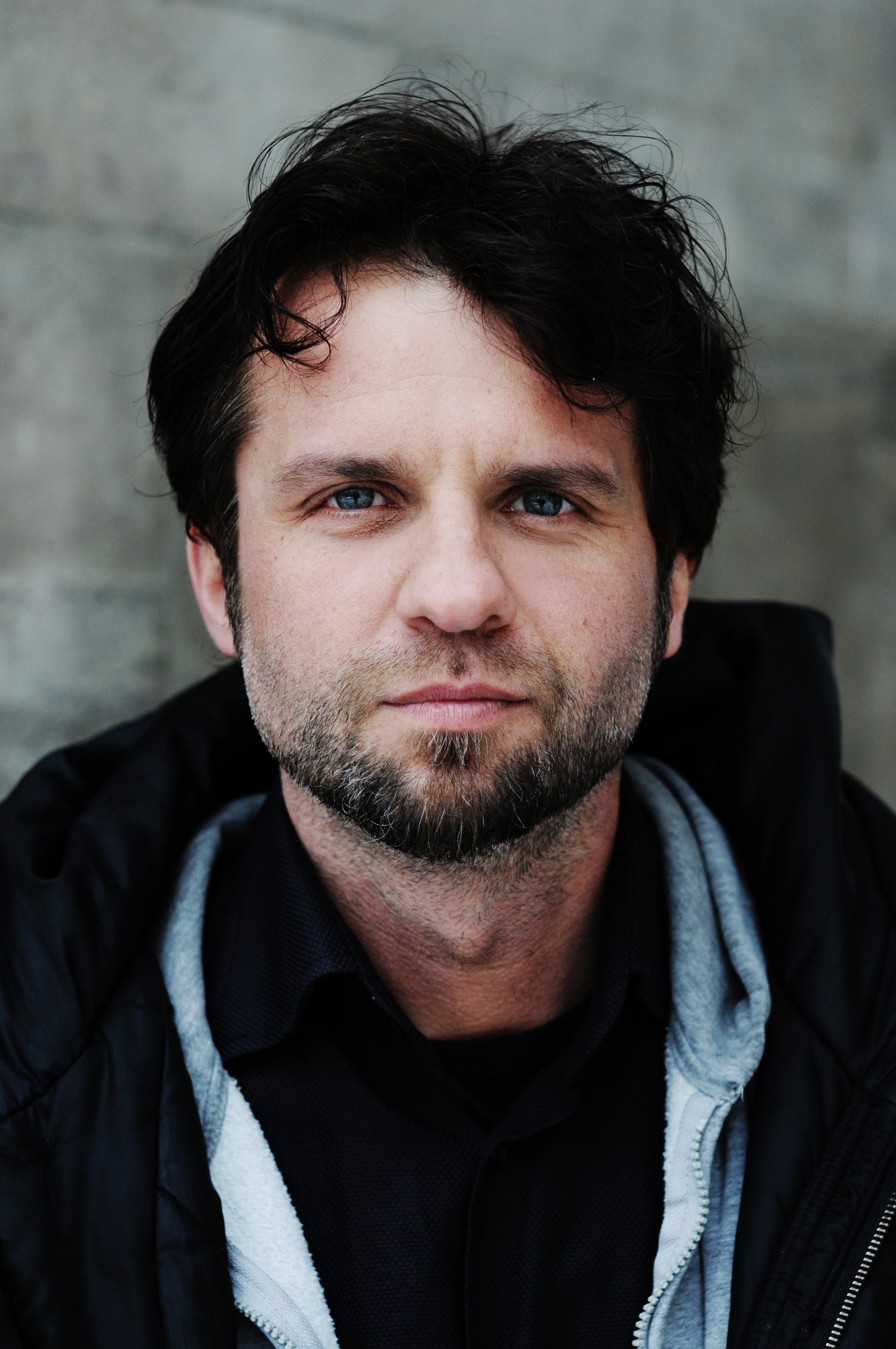
Director Hans Weingartner based the film on his past as a political activist.

According to Weingartner, The Edukators was influenced by his past as a political activist: "There's some of me in the film". He considers it an autobiographical film, with Brühl playing Weingartner. It describes the last 10 years of his life, an attempt to find a political movement satisfying his ideals. It also reflects his frustration over the lack of political ideals among his generation and the effect of advertising and media images. About this, he stated, "We don't know where to put our revolutionary energy and we don't know how to fight the system because we can't grab it, we don't know how to attack it," he said. "The system has become so invulnerable because it sells revolution to us."

The director opted for nonviolence because violence "only makes the system stronger", citing the Baader-Meinhof gang which "practically killed the Left movement in Germany ... because they gave the police an excuse to really arm up and create a more totalitarian system." Instead, Weingartner gave his characters "poetic resistance."

Although Brühl thought the film "very realistic", he was dissatisfied with his character's authenticity. The actor felt "attached" to Jan, admiring his "courage to want to change the way things are going, to act to defend his beliefs", but thought it was "very utopian and naive, that they take so much risk to break into some rich man's house to move things around."

The authenticity of the love triangle was "very important" to Weingartner, who was once part of such a relationship. Although the actors were uncertain at first that Peter could forgive Jan and Jule's betrayal, Weingartner uses the situation to explore his concept of friendship: "Friendship means more to him than bourgeois moral values. Peter loves Jule – he doesn't own her. He can tell that when she falls in love with Jan, their love is a wonderful thing, coloured by a joint rebellion – a shared rejection of social constraint."

=== Production and filming ===
Weingartner said he received an offer large enough that "I would not have to work for the rest of my life" from an American studio but refused it, opting to produce the film with his own studio, y3film, and coop99, an Austrian studio. A low-budget film, it was funded by a €250,000 loan Weingartner obtained with his parents' house as collateral. His second feature film, The Edukators was shot with hand-held digital cameras, allowing the director "to explore the space and give actors license to go wherever they wanted." Weingartner wanted a technically simple film focused on the actors. His decision to have a low budget was measured: "More money means more pressure. This way, I used a limited crew and was able to set the shooting schedule the way I wanted it – usually. The huge advantage of this kind of film-making is that it's rapid." Most of the film was shot in Berlin, except for scenes in the Austrian Alps.

=== Casting ===
The character of Peter was written for Erceg after Weingartner saw him "in a friend's film." Brühl, already a popular actor in Germany, was known to the director, who saw him as a "perfect match" for Erceg. Klaußner was cast because, according to Weingartner, "I knew the energy and vibe between us was right." The most difficult role to cast was Jule; Weingartner searched for eight months, and when he found Jentsch she was committed to another film. Since he was certain that the actress was "the perfect cast", he rescheduled filming.

== Themes and analysis ==
Another theme of the movie is getting rid of one's fears. It's important to put an end to anxiety, to stop worrying about safety and security. Freedom is more strenuous than safety ... I believe that human beings are nomadic. They need to be free. And nowadays, very few of us are. Most people are like Hardenberg, prisoners of their own possessions. 'What you own,' someone once said, 'One day owns you.'

— Hans Weingartner

Weingartner commented that the film is "about economic revolution, about poor vs. rich." He also tried to explore in the film the fact that, in his opinion, "Today, we live in a society in which revolution is on sale." For example, in the film Jan comments that revolutionary icon Che Guevara now appears on T-shirts. Hardenberg's "psycho-sexual powerplay" against the main characters while in the Alps stands for what Weingartner considers "a betrayal of European Left by hippie-era survivors including Joschka Fischer, Gerhard Schroder—and Tony Blair." Nonetheless, Weingartner was "not calling for revolution with this film. It was much more important to me to emphasize how important it is to be critical and to question the status quo".

Even if the subject of the film is political, it deals with "lots of themes," and "the theme of revolution, of rebellion," and of "how a person can change the course of his life" are the main ones. Similarly, Brühl commented that "there are different things you can take out of it" as the film also deals with generational conflict and stories of love and friendship. Weingartner said, "the whole idea of 'Edukating' is playful. The movie is full of jokes. And happiness. I read somewhere that kids laugh out loud more than 150 times a day. Adults laugh only 10 times a day. Well, I want people to laugh. I want people to go see the film and have fun."

Like Brühl, Juliane Grieb of the British Film Institute also stressed its "generational conflict" theme. While Roxanne Sancto of Paste dubbed it as a film about "disillusioned youth", Boyd van Hoeij, writing for The Hollywood Reporter, said that it was part of a trend of films that "attempt to figure out what it is about political extremes that seduces young people – and how their idealism and hormone-powered gumption can eventually come head-to-head with the much uglier realities of politics and life".

== Release and reception ==
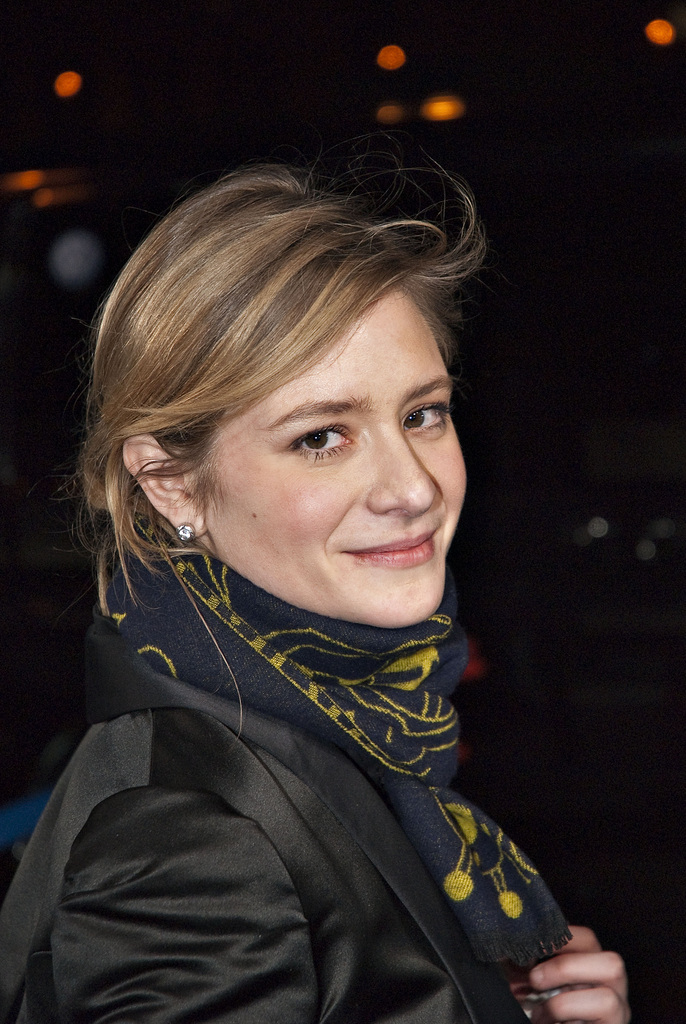
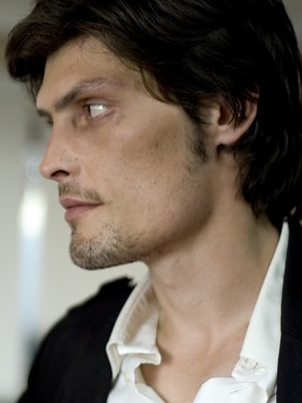
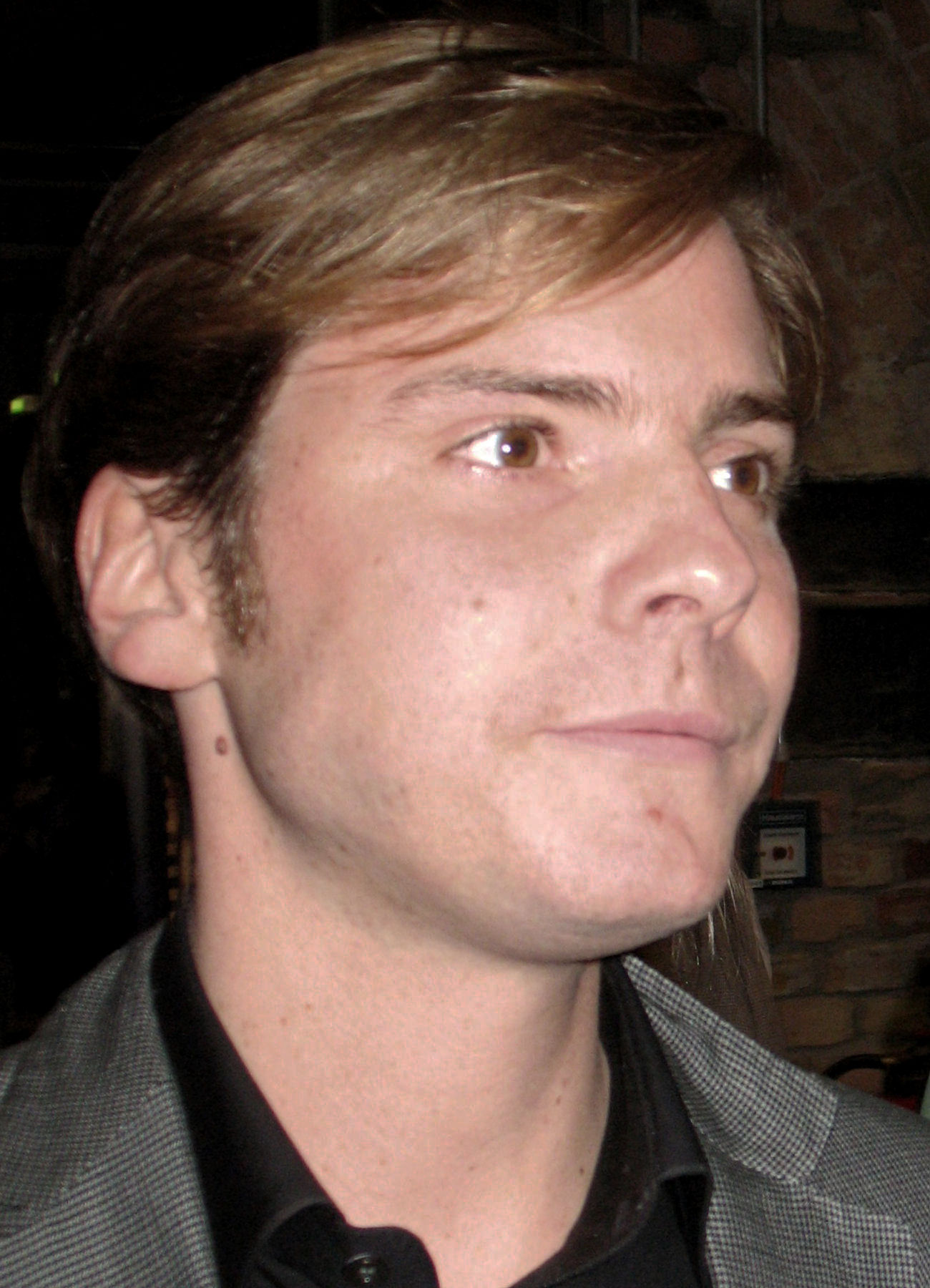
The main characters received accolades for their performances:
- Jentsch (above) received two awards and a nomination.
- Erceg (centre) won an award and received a nomination.
- Brühl was nominated for a Best Actor European Film Award.

=== Accolades and public reception ===
The Edukators premiered on 17 May at the 2004 Cannes Film Festival, where it received a 10-minute standing ovation. There it was nominated for the Palme d'Or, marking the first time a German film entered in the competition since 1993, when Wim Wenders' Faraway, So Close! did it. Cinematographers Daniela Knapp and Matthias Schellenberg were nominated for the 2004 Camerimage. The film won the Silver Giraldillo (second place) at the 2004 Seville European Film Festival, and that year Brühl was nominated for a European Film Award for Best Actor. Of the German Cinema New Talent Awards at the 2004 Munich Film Festival, Weingartner was Best Director, Erceg Best Actor, and writers Weingartner and Held received a jury award.

Erceg and Jentsch were nominated for the 2005 New Faces Award. At the 2005 German Film Awards The Edukators shared the Best Feature Film Silver Award with Sophie Scholl – The Final Days, Klaußner was Best Supporting Actor and Weingartner was nominated for the Best Director Award. It was the Best Film and Jentsch the Best Actress at the 2005 German Film Critics Association Awards. At the 2005 Bavarian Film Awards, Jentsch won Best New Actress. The film shared the Audience Award for Best Dramatic Feature at the 2005 Miami International Film Festival with The Overture and Red Dust.

The Edukators debuted in German theaters on 25 November 2004, and the following day in Austria. According to the European Audiovisual Observatory, the film was seen by over 1.4 million people in Europe: almost 890,000 in Germany, 71,000 in Austria and 67,000 in Switzerland. The highest attendance in non-German-speaking countries was in France (over 72,000) and Turkey (over 69,000). Box Office Mojo reported gross earnings of US$8,152,859 in Argentina, Austria, the Czech Republic, Germany, the Netherlands, New Zealand, Norway, Portugal, Slovakia, Taiwan, the United Kingdom and the United States. In Germany and Austria, the film's home countries, it grossed US$4,540,541 and US$479,678 respectively. Since its release The Edukators has become a cult film.

=== Critical reception ===
The film was generally well received by critics. Based on 76 reviews collected by Rotten Tomatoes, it has an overall approval rating of 70% from critics and an average score of 6.5 out of 10. According to the website's consensus, "The Edukators engagingly plays out the clash between youthful idealism and older pragmaticism." Metacritic, which assigns a normalised rating from 100 top reviews by mainstream critics, calculated a score of 68 based on 28 reviews, indicating "generally favorable reviews". Stephanie Bunbury of The Age wrote that in Germany it was a "huge hit ... Abroad, however, it has been the butt of plenty of criticism. It is too earnest, too naive, too Teutonic and sincere."

Joe Morgenstern of The Wall Street Journal called The Edukators "an uncommonly smart and interesting" film, and the Austin Chronicle's Marc Savlov said the film was a "smart, kicky little gem that owes as much to Guy Debord and the Situationists." According to Sean Axmaker of the Seattle Post-Intelligencer, it was "a rare film that gets smarter as it goes along ... inject[ing] a satisfying dash of pragmatism every time it seems ready to slip into either unearned idealism or cynical fatalism." Ray Bennett wrote for The Hollywood Reporter, "The Edukators is that rare beast, a terrific movie that boasts intelligent wit, expert storytelling, delightful characters and grown-up dialogue plus suspense and a wicked surprise ending."

A. O. Scott of The New York Times wrote that despite "its shortcomings" on political subjects, it "succeeds brilliantly in telling the story of a man who falls in love with his best buddy's girlfriend and doesn't know what to do about it." Tim Appelo of Seattle Weekly praised "the marvelous acting, the sensitive, utterly realistic treatment of the young-love triangle," adding: "The Edukators is educational—not intellectually, but emotionally." Washington Post critic Stephen Hunter praised the film's realism: "The whole thing feels messy, painful, funny and believable, just like that hideous circus known as real life." The Times' Howard Swains wrote that it "manages to combine political discourse, a love-triangle and a hostage plot, all without sacrificing its graceful humour." Los Angeles Times critic Carina Chocano described it as a "sweet, funny and gripping romantic adventure," and "The only accurate, ironic and poignant depiction of what it's like to be young and socially committed in the WTO era". Chocano choose it as one of the 13 best films released in 2005. Liese Spencer of Sight & Sound also elected it as one of the best five films of 2005.

Not all reviews were positive. The Orlando Sentinel's Roger Moore called The Edukators "a surprisingly generic German 'Stockholm syndrome' romantic triangle thriller," adding: "It ends interestingly, but it would've ended better, and played better, had it been half an hour shorter." In Slant Magazine, Jason Clark wrote that the film needed "a touch of the perverse", but "Weingartner plays out the drama far too earnestly, and the story barely sustains the length of a movie half of its running time." According to Jack Mathews of the New York Daily News, "The dialogue between the captive and the captors gets a little didactic, and the ending is as contrived as it is cynical." Similar criticism of the film's didacticism was made by Brett Michel of Boston Phoenix, Kriss Allison of Stylus Magazine and Glenn Whipp of the Los Angeles Daily News.

Andre Wright wrote for The Stranger, "[It] starts strong, with an ingratiatingly anarchic vibe, but quickly devolves into a dust-dry, hectoring socialist lecture: a cinematic version of Kenner's My First Revolution playset." Jonathan Romney of The Independent said that Weingartner "presents his indictment of the System in crudely stacked terms that make The Edukators very much a teen movie rather than a plausible political statement." In The Times, Wendy Ide wrote: "What could have been an effective piece of drama, a dialogue to cause both sides to question the very foundations of their belief systems, is just a two-hour rant from a wispy bearded idealist whose idea of brotherhood is to sleep with his best friend's girlfriend."

The film has been considered to be part of a "New German Wave" in the cinema. The Deutsche Welle staff considered it to be one of the best German films of 2004 and early 2005. In 2018, the British Film Institute named it one of the ten "great German films of the 21st century". News publisher The Local and DE magazine Deutschland also included the film among the best ten films of Germany in 2018 and 2019 articles.

=== Cultural impact ===
In 2006 a group of left-wing activists calling itself "Hamburg for Free" dressed as superheroes, robbing food from upper-class stores to distribute to the underclass. The media considered the crimes inspired by the film, and some protesters had T-shirts and banners reading "Die fetten Jahre sind vorbei" (The Edukators' original title). In 2009, a statue stolen from Bernard Madoff was returned with a note ("Bernie the Swindler, Lesson: Return stolen property to rightful owners") signed by "The Educators".

It gained international attention and in 2006 it was announced that Brad Anderson would adapt and direct a version of the film set in the United States.

In 2013, a Brazilian stage adaptation of The Edukators was directed by João Fonseca and scripted by Rafael Gomes. The idea came from Pablo Sanábio, who stars in the play as Peter. The remaining cast was composed by Fabrício Belsoff (Jan), Nathália Lage (Jule) and Edmílson Barros (Hardenberg). To promote the play, furniture-like sculptures by juvenile interns in Rio de Janeiro were placed in affluent neighborhoods such as Flamengo, Gávea, Ipanema, Lagoa and Leblon. Film director Weingartner approved the stage adaptation and besides watching it in Rio de Janeiro, he made a five-minute montage for the play featuring The Edukator film scenes and newspaper headlines about the Arab Spring and Occupy Wall Street. After being staged in Rio de Janeiro, performances were also held in São Paulo, Porto Alegre, Salvador, Brasília, and Belo Horizonte.

== See also ==
- List of films featuring home invasions
