= Daniel Brühl =

German and Spanish actor (born 1978)

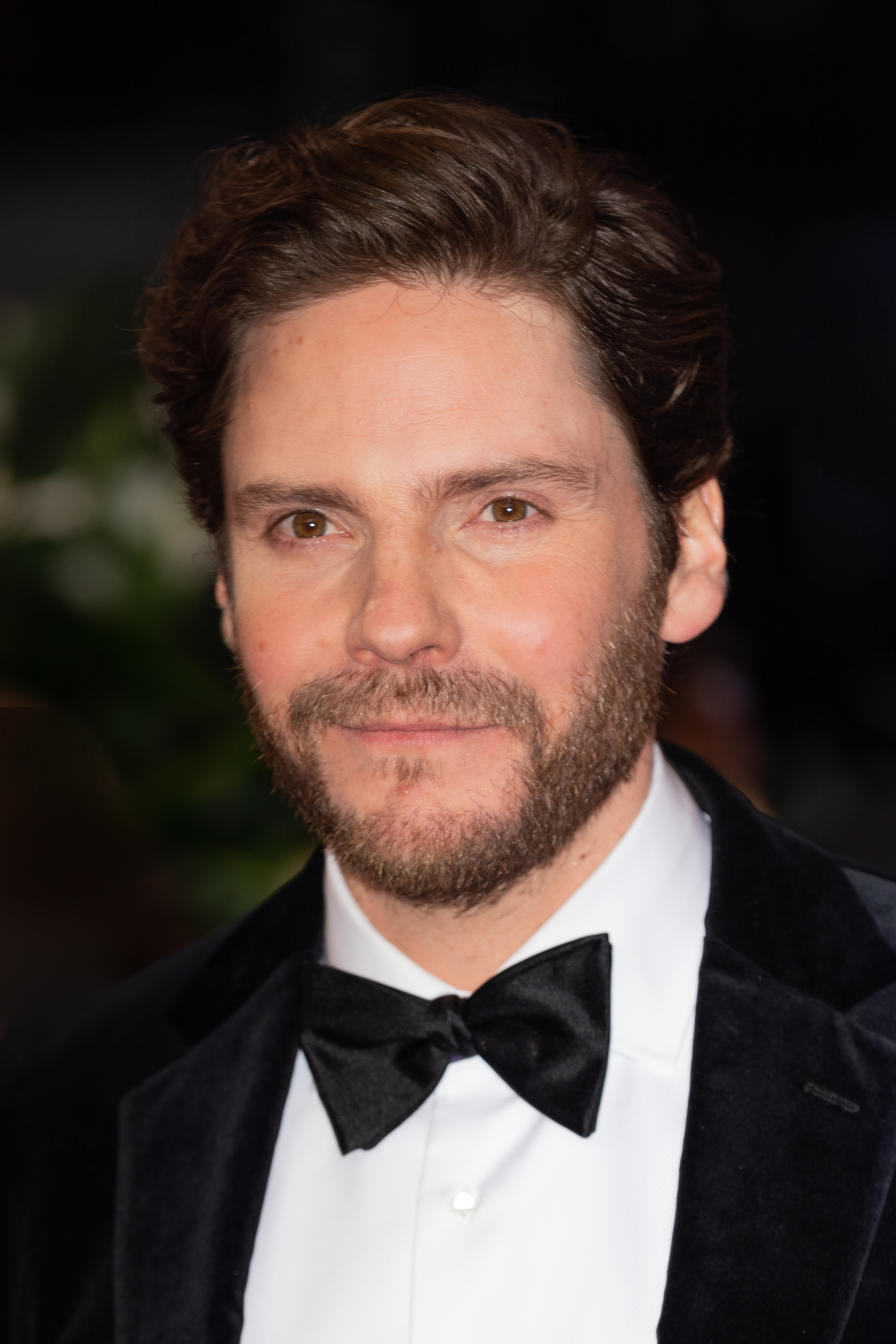
- Brühl in 2020
- Born: Daniel César Martín Brühl González; 16 June 1978 (age 48); Barcelona, Spain
- Citizenship: Germany; Spain
- Occupations: Actor; film producer
- Years active: 1995–present
- Spouse: Felicitas Rombold (m. 2017)
- Partner: Jessica Schwarz (2001–2006)
- Children: 2

Daniel César Martín Brühl González (Note: In this Spanish name, the first or paternal surname is Brühl and the second or maternal family name is González.) (German: [ˈdaːni̯eːl ˈbʁyːl, -ni̯ɛl -]; Spanish: [daˈnjel ˈbɾul ɡonˈθaleθ]; born 16 June 1978) is a German and Spanish actor. He has received various accolades, including three European Film Awards and three German Film Awards, along with nominations for two Golden Globe Awards and a BAFTA Award. He received his first German Film Award for Best Actor for his roles in Das Weisse Rauschen (2001), Nichts Bereuen (2001), and Vaya con Dios (2002). His starring role in the German film Good Bye, Lenin! (2003) received widespread recognition and critical acclaim, and garnered him the European Film Award for Best Actor and another German Film Award for Best Actor.

He was introduced to mainstream international audiences through his breakthrough performance as Fredrick Zoller, a Nazi German war hero in Quentin Tarantino's Inglourious Basterds (2009), and appearances in films like The Bourne Ultimatum (2007), The Fifth Estate (2013), and A Most Wanted Man (2014). Brühl received widespread critical acclaim and further recognition for his portrayal of former Formula 1 driver Niki Lauda in the biographical film Rush (2013), for which he earned nominations including the Golden Globe Award for Best Supporting Actor, the Critic's Choice Award for Best Supporting Actor, the Screen Actors Guild Award for Best Supporting Actor and the BAFTA Award for Best Actor in a Supporting Role.

In the Marvel Cinematic Universe, Brühl portrays Helmut Zemo in Captain America: Civil War (2016) and the Disney+ series The Falcon and the Winter Soldier (2021). He also starred as Dr. Laszlo Kreizler in the television series The Alienist (2018–2020), for which he earned a nomination for the Golden Globe Award as Best Actor in a Television Motion Picture at the 76th Golden Globe Awards in 2018.

== Early life ==
Brühl was born on 16 June 1978 in Barcelona. His father was the German television director and documentarian Hanno Brühl, who was born in São Paulo, Brazil. His mother is Marisa González Domingo, a Spanish teacher. Shortly after his birth, the family moved from Spain to Cologne, Germany, where he grew up. He was raised speaking Spanish, German, Catalan, Portuguese and French. He attended secondary school at the Dreikönigsgymnasium, the oldest school in Cologne.

== Career ==
=== 1995–2002: Early work ===
Brühl began acting at a young age despite not having any formal training as an actor. He participated in children's theater at school and first earned money at age 8 doing radio plays, followed by work in a dubbing studio leading to one of the dubbing actors to recommend the teenager to a talent agency. At age 15, Brühl landed a small part in the TV film Sven's Secret, played the street kid Benji in the soap opera Verbotene Liebe (Forbidden Love)(1995), and continued to feature in television series in the following years. In 1999, he appeared in his film debut as Checo in Paradise Mall (Schlaraffenland) and voiced Kom in the German version of Le château des singes. In 2000, he starred in his first main role as Markus Baasweiler in No More School (Schule), and was cast as Jay in Deeply.

In 2001, he continued to play main roles as the schizophrenic Lukas in Hans Weingartner's critically acclaimed debut film Das Weisse Rauschen (The White Sound), as Daniel in Nichts Bereuen (No Regrets), and as Marek in Honolulu. In 2002, he starred as Arbo in Vaya con Dios and as boxer Marko Stemper in Elefantenherz (Elephant Heart). He won the German Film Award (2002) for Best Actor, the Bavarian Film Award (2001) for Best New Actor, and the New Faces Award (2002) for Best Actor for his performance in Das Weisse Rauschen, Nichts Bereuen, and Vaya con Dios. He won the German Film Critics Award (2003) for Best Actor for Das Weisse Rauschen and Vaya con Dios. For Das Weisse Rauschen, Brühl insisted on meeting someone with paranoid schizophrenia to avoid the risk of making the character look clichéd. Two decades later, he still considers it his most difficult character to portray and comments that "It was important for me to explore my own madness, to believe in what I was doing and to convince myself that I was suffering from that disease, so it was quite difficult." The film has been widely cited by the academic community in discussing and understanding schizophrenia due to its realistic portrayal.

=== 2003–2008: Breakthrough and early success ===
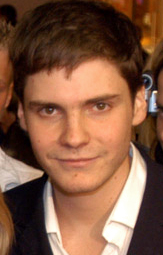
Brühl in 2004

Brühl's international breakthrough role came in 2003 as Alex Kerner in Wolfgang Becker's German tragicomedy Good Bye, Lenin! which tells about a German family that lived during the unification of Germany. The film became one of the most successful German films to date, receiving nominations at the Golden Globe Awards and the BAFTA Awards and winning at the European Film Awards, German Film Awards, Cesar Awards, and London Film Critics' Circle among others. It was sold to more than 65 countries, reaching an estimated six million cinema-goers worldwide. In that year, Brühl won awards including the European Film Awards Peoples's Choice Award for Best European Actor and the European Film Award for Best Actor for the role. He also won his second German Film Award as Best Actor for both his performance in the film and in Elefantenherz. He then voiced Kenai in the German version of Brother Bear.

Brühl reached further recognition in 2004 reuniting with filmmaker Hans Weingartner and starring as the anti-capitalist activist Jan in the internationally successful film The Edukators (Die Fetten Jahre sind vorbei). The film became a cult film as part of a "German New Wave" and received a 10-minute standing ovation at its premier at the 2004 Cannes Film Festival where it was nominated for the Palme d'Or. Brühl earned a nomination for the European Film Award for Best Actor for his role. At the same time, he won the European Film Awards Peoples's Choice Award for Best European Actor for his role as Paul in Love in Thoughts of which plot is based on the Steglitz student tragedy involving two teenagers who created a suicide club.

In the same year, Brühl made his English-speaking film debut in Ladies in Lavender, starring alongside English actresses Judi Dench and Maggie Smith as Andrea Marowski, and met Queen Elizabeth II who attended its premiere. He also played Frank in Farland. Brühl featured as Lieutenant Horstmayer of the German 93rd Infantry Regiment, a central character in the 2005 film Joyeux Noël, a trilingual World War I film based on the experiences of French, German and Scottish soldiers during the Christmas truce of 1914. The film shows Brühl's linguistic ability as he ably communicates in German, French and English throughout.

In 2006, he was invited to be part of the short film and Cinéfondation juries of the Cannes Film Festival. He starred as Chris in Cargo and Karl in A Friend of Mine, voiced Lightning McQueen in the German version of Cars and reprised his voice-over role as Kenai in the German version of Brother Bear 2. In Cannes-nominated film Salvador (Puig Antich), he played Salvador Puig Antich, a Spanish anarchist executed during the Franco era, marking his first time acting in his second language. In 2007, Brühl made a cameo appearance in 2 Days in Paris, a romantic comedy film directed by French actress Julie Delpy. He appeared in a small role as Martin Kreutz in the film The Bourne Ultimatum. In 2008, he starred in the British-Russian production In Transit, in which he played a young Nazi soldier named Klaus opposite John Malkovich. He also played Tonda in Krabat, which was based on a popular German children's story, and Marcos in A Bit of Chocolate.

=== 2009–2015: Worldwide recognition and critical acclaim ===
In 2009, Brühl starred as Dr. Georg Rosen, a notable member of the International Safety Zone Committee in Nanjing, China, in the German-Chinese-French biographical film John Rabe. He played Amaro in Las madres de Elna, István Thurzó in Julie Delpy's third directorial film The Countess, Tobias Hardmann in Dinosaurier – Gegen uns seht ihr alt aus!, and David Kern in Lila, Lila. He was introduced to mainstream U.S. audiences in the role of Fredrick Zoller, a German war hero in Quentin Tarantino's Inglourious Basterds, starring Brad Pitt, which premiered at the 2009 Cannes Film Festival to widespread acclaim. The film won multiple awards and nominations, among them 8 Academy Award nominations including Best Picture. He and his co-stars won ensemble cast awards including the Screen Actors Guild Award for Outstanding Performance by a Cast in a Motion Picture. In May, Brühl decided to become active in a different field of filmmaking by launching the production company Fouronfilm together with Film1.

In 2010, he starred as Rupert in King's Road (Kóngavegur 7) and as Hans Krämer in The Coming Days (Die kommenden Tage). In 2011, he starred as cybernetics engineer Álex Garel employed by his former university to design robot software in Eva, a science fiction film set in the year 2041. He portrayed English teacher Konrad Koch who introduced Britain's football to his students in late 19th century Germany in Lessons of a Dream (Der ganz große Traum). He played the Oak Fairy in 2 Days in New York and starred as ethnology student Dirk whose thesis is on the aging population in All Together (Et si on vivait tous ensemble?) alongside Jane Fonda and Geraldine Chaplin. He also co-starred as Father Antonio with Clive Owen in the horror thriller Intruders. In 2012, he starred as Iván Pelayo in Winning Streak (The Pelayos) and as Leonardo in 7 Days in Havana.

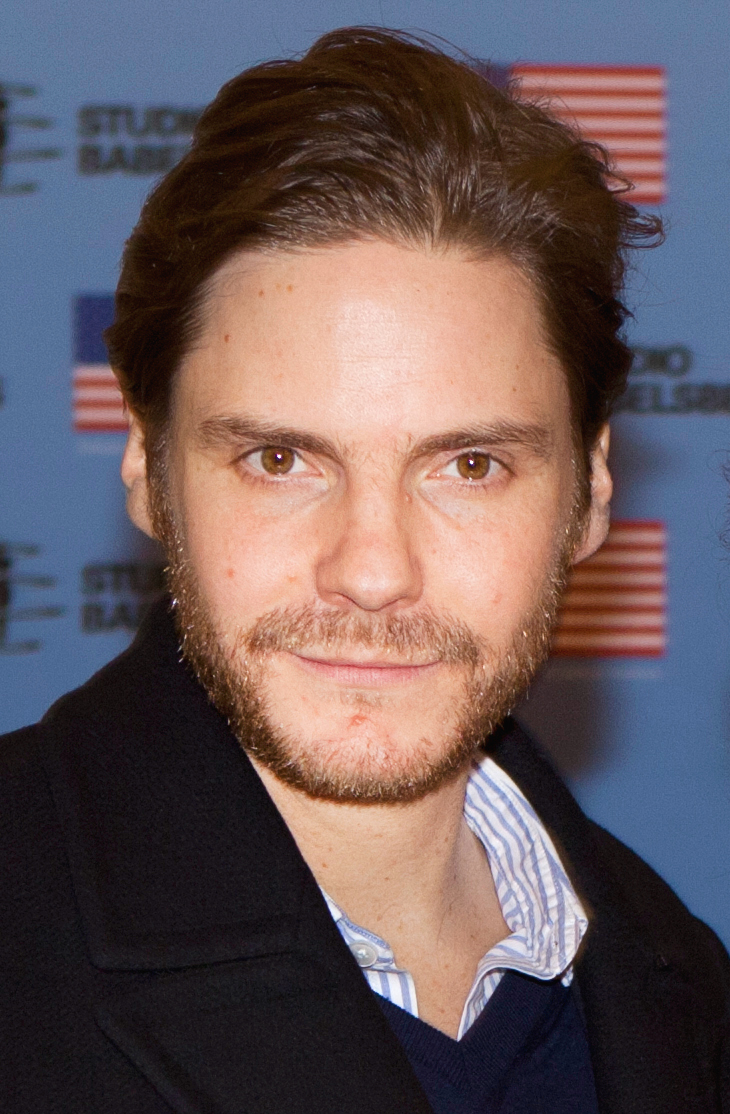
Brühl at the Berlin Embassy of the United States in 2015

In 2013, he co-starred in The Fifth Estate, a film based on the founding of WikiLeaks in which Brühl played co-founder Daniel Domscheit-Berg alongside Benedict Cumberbatch as Julian Assange. In the same year, Brühl portrayed former Formula 1 driver Niki Lauda in the Ron Howard biographical film Rush opposite Chris Hemsworth. After he was cast, he took Formula Three lessons and later more lessons with Hemsworth. He came to Vienna to meet Lauda who also flew him to the Brazilian Grand Prix to feel the racing atmosphere where he watched in the pit with the Mercedes team, putting on an earpiece to listen to conversations, and spoke to Formula 1 drivers. He had to endure seven hours of prosthetics daily during taping as his face structure was altered to take on Lauda's features. Brühl added layers that are different from Lauda to find the right balance of not just imitating the person, but also being creative. The film was a commercial and critical success. For his authentic portrayal of Lauda in terms of accent and mannerisms, he received multiple award nominations including the Golden Globe Award for Best Supporting Actor, the Critic's Choice Award for Best Supporting Actor, the Screen Actors Guild Award for Best Supporting Actor and the BAFTA Award for Best Actor in a Supporting Role.

In 2014, he starred in A Most Wanted Man as Maximilian alongside Philip Seymour Hoffman and Rachel McAdams, in The Face of an Angel as Thomas, and in the series The Trip as a patron at Terrace Bar. In 2015, Brühl was part of the Berlinale jury along with Darren Aronofsky, Audrey Tautou, and Bong Joon-ho among others. He reunited with director Wolfang Becker in one of his best performances as young writer Sebastian Zöllner in Me and Kaminski and played Austrian investigative journalist Hubertus Czernin in the biographical drama Woman in Gold alongside Helen Mirren and Ryan Reynolds. He co-starred with Emma Watson and Michael Nyqvist in Colonia. He also played maître d'hôtel Tony Balerdi in Burnt alongside Bradley Cooper. In preparation for the role, he was trained as a maître d' in Marcus Wareing's Michelin-star restaurant in London. Brühl said that since he has done the film, he has much more respect and appreciation for food, taking his time while eating and tasting, imagining the incredible effort behind it. In the same year, Brühl became a partner at Berlin- and Hamburg-based production company Amusement Park Film as a producer.

=== 2016–present: Marvel Cinematic Universe and continued acclaim ===
In 2016, Brühl starred as Escherich in Alone in Berlin, and convicted murderer Jens Söring in Killing for Love. Brühl played the Marvel Comics supervillain Helmut Zemo alongside Chris Evans and Robert Downey Jr. in one of the most critically acclaimed films in the Marvel Cinematic Universe, Captain America: Civil War (2016). In Niki Caro's World War II film The Zookeeper's Wife (2017) about a married couple who saved hundreds of Jews, Brühl played Nazi zoologist Lutz Heck, who forced Jan and Antonina Żabiński to abandon the Warsaw Zoo. He starred as Ernst Schmidt in The Cloverfield Paradox, an installment in the Cloverfield franchise, and as Wilfried Böse, a founding member of the German organization Revolutionary Cells, in the action thriller Entebbe (7 Days in Entebbe) which recounts the story of Operation Entebbe.

From 2018 to 2020, he played the title role as Dr. Laszlo Kreizler in The Alienist, an American period crime drama series based on the 1994 novel by Caleb Carr, alongside Luke Evans and Dakota Fanning. In his preparation, Brühl read about famous pioneering psychologists of the time (Sigmund Freud, Josef Breuer, and Carl Jung) and went to psychotherapy in Budapest just to get an understanding of the way they worked and thought. His wife Felicitas, a practicing psychotherapist, also put him in touch with criminal psychologists. In 2019, he received nominations for the Golden Globe Award as Best Actor in a Television Motion Picture and the Satellite Award for Best Actor in a Miniseries or Television Film for his role in the series which was nominated at the Primetime Emmy Awards as Outstanding Limited Series and the Golden Globe Awards as Best Television Motion Picture. In the same year, he played fertility physician Thomas in My Zoe (2019) which was his first foray into executive production.

2021 marked Brühl's directorial debut through his dark comedy film Next Door (Nebenan), which premiered in the Berlinale Competition section at the Berlin International Film Festival as a Golden Bear nominee, wherein he also acted as Daniel, a vain and mean version of himself. The film won as Best Film and Brühl won as Best Actor in the Taormina Film Festival. He reprised his role as Helmut Zemo in the Disney+ series The Falcon and the Winter Soldier. His dancing which he improvised in The Falcon and the Winter Soldier became viral and was released in the Zemo Cut. He also starred in the Academy Award-nominated Netflix film All Quiet on the Western Front in which he played Matthias Erzberger.

== Reception and acting style ==
"If Daniel Brühl were a natural American or British talent, without a doubt he'd be a household name, based on the level of his acting ability but also on who he is, he's here for the long haul, he's highly intelligent, balanced, sensible...He's complex enough as a human being to be able to do justice to the most complex parts."

— Peter Morgan on Brühl

The roles Brühl takes on are often morally complex characters, men who are suffering with a deep-seated darkness that threatens to weigh down their inherent humanity. He has utilized method acting since the beginning of his career. A German and Spanish national, he has played at least ten different nationalities (Polish, Spanish, French, Hungarian, German, Austrian, British, American, Argentine and a fictional Sokovian) and in his films has spoken English, Spanish, German, and French comfortably, as well as Polish, Russian, and Chinese. Writing for The Hollywood Reporter in 2018, Katie Kilkenny said: "If Hollywood executives have a global, and particularly European, male part to cast, there's a good chance Bruhl will make the shortlist. How did Bruhl become Hollywood's answer to a global everyman? The answer, collaborators say, lies not only in Bruhl's multilingualism, but also his choice of collaborators and Hollywood's welcoming of an influx of German talent in the last two decades." In a 2017 interview with Gentleman's Journal, Brühl attributed his success to finding his niche as an actor.

On being typecast as a villain after taking on an increasing number of antagonistic roles, Brühl said that though it was a privilege to have made Good Bye, Lenin!, it was also a "curse" because he "was always offered the part of the sympathetic nice guy" and was refreshed and relieved when offered villain roles outside of Germany. The Hollywood Insider noted his atypical career arc, "He went from consistently playing the love interest in European Cinema to playing the villain in Hollywood". Due to Brühl's performance, Baron Zemo has become one of the most iconic villains in the Marvel Cinematic Universe, despite having no superpowers. Film School Rejects remarks, "Even when embodying the role of a Nazi or another nefarious villain, Brühl manages to bring out the character's humanity — no matter how little of it there actually is". Brühl has also been described as having an "innate likability and charm". The LA Times deemed his openness as such that "even his irony sounds straightforward". He has also been lauded for his work ethic. He befriended activist Daniel Domscheit-Berg and racing driver Niki Lauda after meeting them in preparation for his roles.

Brühl has worked in both European and American film productions in several languages (English, Catalan, Spanish, German, French, Polish, and Chinese) and played at least ten different nationalities, including Polish (Ladies in Lavender), Catalan (Salvador), Spanish (7 Days in Havana), French (2 Days in Paris), Hungarian (The Countess), German (Inglourious Basterds, Entebbe, and most German productions), Austrian (Rush, Woman in Gold), English (Burnt), American (The Alienist) and Sokovian (a fictional Eastern European country in Captain America: Civil War).

== Advertising ==
In 2020, Brühl became a CUPRA ambassador, launching the CUPRA Leon e-HYBRID as the brand's first plug-in hybrid model. In May 2021, he introduced its first 100% electric model— the CUPRA Born. For a 2023 collaboration of fashion brands The Elder Statesman and Zegna, he appeared in an advertising campaign. In 2025, he featured in a Montblanc commercial directed by Wes Anderson.

== Public image ==
Brühl is referred to as the "golden boy of German film" and the "undisputed ruler of the European acting elite" by The Gentleman's Journal on its May/June 2017 cover. He is also regarded as the most recognizable German actor to emerge since the country's reunification. He graced the GQ Germany cover issue in December 2015 and was the recipient of the GQ Film National Award at the 2015 GQ Men of the Year Awards. He also headlined Esquire Spain, Esquire Germany, and Men's Health Best Fashion magazine, and featured in Esquire UK. He shot a Vogue and GQ Germany advert with his wife too.

In February 2017, he was honoured by the French government at the Berlin International Film Festival and awarded the Chevalier de l'Ordre des Arts et des Lettres for his 'major contribution to the influence of film culture in France, Germany, Europe and the world', making him a Knight of the Order of Arts and Literature. He was offered membership in the Academy of Motion Picture Arts and Sciences in June 2017 to vote for the Oscars. In October 2018, Brühl accompanied Germany's Federal President Frank-Walter Steinmeier and his wife Elke Büdenbender during their visit to Spain.

== Personal life ==
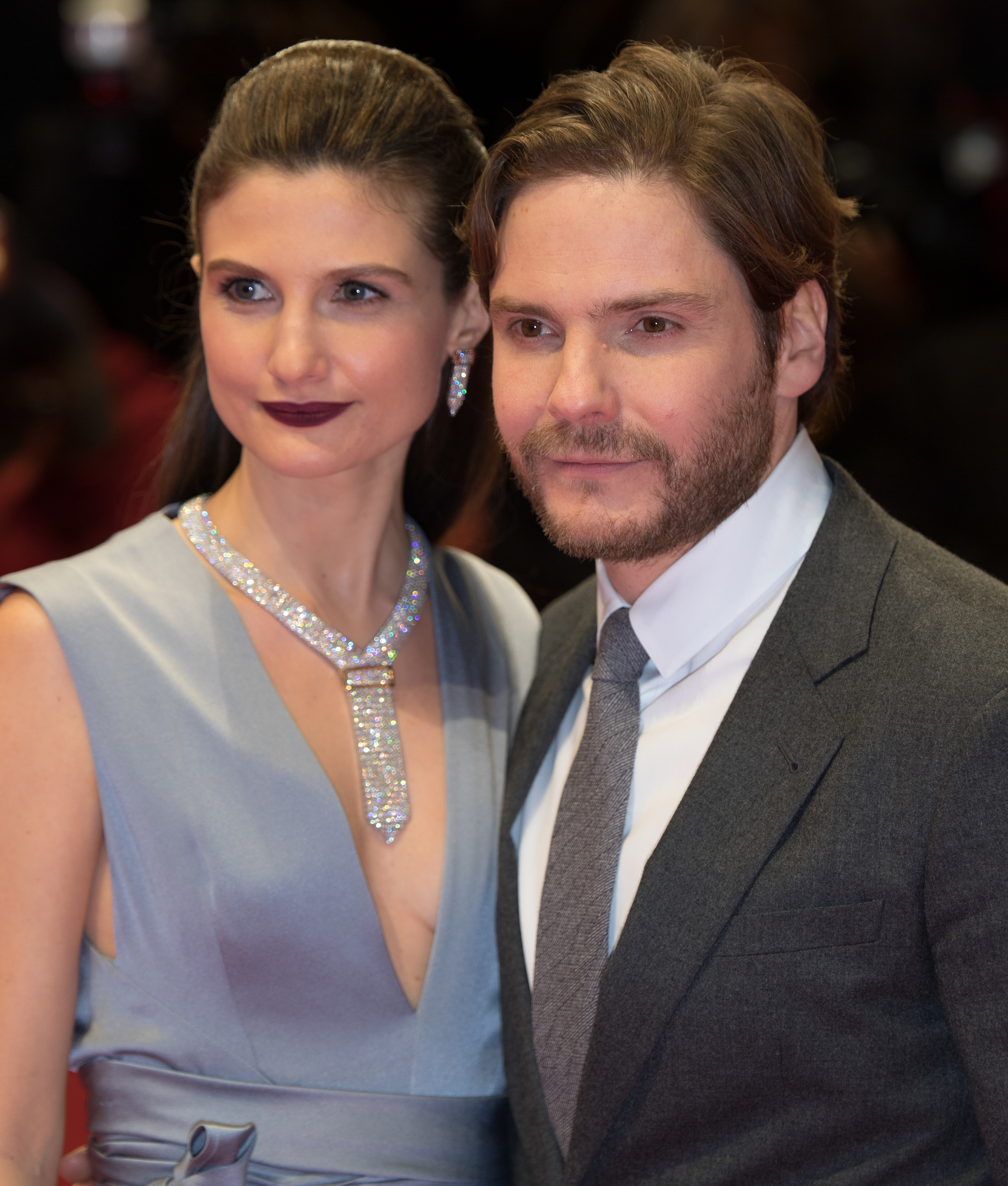
Brühl with his partner Felicitas Rombold at the 2018 Berlin International Film Festival

In 2006, Brühl separated from his longtime girlfriend and later fiancée, actress Jessica Schwarz, whom he had met on the set of the 2001 film No Regrets. Since 2010, he has been in a relationship with practising psychotherapist and former model-actress Felicitas Rombold. They married in 2017. Their first son was born in October 2016. The couple had a second son in 2020.

Brühl's hobbies include running and hiking, and playing and watching tennis. His favourite player is Rafael Nadal; they are both left handed.

=== Philanthropy ===
Since 2017, Brühl has been campaigning for the United Nations World Food Programme, the 2020 Nobel Peace Prize winner. In 2019, he supported the "Do something for Europe!" initiative to foster solidarity in Europe and The Global Fund's Step Up The Fight initiative to end AIDS, tuberculosis, and malaria. In the same year, he campaigned for Earth Alliance's emergency Amazon Forest Fund to support partners working on the ground to protect the Amazon. In 2020, he was one of the 25 personalities to donate a personal item for the Los Fuer Lesbos (Win for Lesvos) Leave No One Behind campaign in support of refugees, donating his antique walking stick from the set of The Alienist.

=== Writing ===
Brühl's book Ein Tag in Barcelona follows him on a one-day journey through Barcelona. His book Tapas!, co-authored with Atilano González, recreates the best dishes served at the Bar Raval in Berlin.

- Brühl, Daniel; Cáceres, Javier (2012). Ein Tag in Barcelona. Berlin: Ullstein Verlag. ISBN 978-3-550-08832-2.
- Brühl, Daniel; Gonzales, Atilano (2014). ¡Tapas!: Die spanische Küche der Bar Raval. Königswinter: Heel Verlag. ISBN 978-3-86852-950-0.

=== Other ventures ===
Since 2011, Brühl has been the joint operator of a tapas bar named Bar Raval, located in the Kreuzberg district of Berlin. It opened during the first weekend of the 2011 Berlinale. From February to October 2017, he was joint operator of a similar bar in Prenzlauer Berg named Bar Gracia after Barcelona's nightlife district Gràcia, which closed due to lack of financial success.

== Filmography ==
Key
†	Denotes films that have not yet been released

=== Film ===
Year	Title	Role	Notes
1999	Paradise Mall (Schlaraffenland)	Checo	
1999	Le château des singes	Kom	German version, voice
2000	A Handful of Grass	Bernd	
2000	Deeply	Jay	
2000	Stundenhotel		
2000	No More School (Schule)	Markus Baasweiler	
2001	The White Sound	Lukas	
2001	Honolulu	Marek	
2001	No Regrets (Nichts bereuen)	Daniel	
2002	Elephant Heart	Marko Stemper	
2002	Vaya con Dios	Arbo	
2003	Good Bye, Lenin!	Alexander Kerner	
2003	Die Klasse von '99	Schnubbi	
2003	Der letzte Flug	Uffz. Barthel	Short film
2003	Brother Bear	Kenai	German version, voice
2004	Love in Thoughts (Was nützt die Liebe in Gedanken)	Paul Krantz	
2004	The Edukators (Die fetten Jahre sind vorbei)	Jan	
2004	Ladies in Lavender	Andrea Marowski	
2004	Farland	Frank	
2005	Merry Christmas (Joyeux Noël)	Le Lieutenant Horstmayer	
2006	Cargo	Chris	
2006	Cars	Lightning McQueen	German version, voice
2006	Salvador (Puig Antich)	Salvador Puig Antich	
2006	A Friend of Mine (Ein Freund von mir)	Karl	
2006	Brother Bear 2	Kenai	German version, voice
2007	2 Days in Paris	Lukas	
2007	The Bourne Ultimatum	Martin Kreutz	
2008	In Transit (In Tranzit)	Klaus	
2008	A Bit of Chocolate (Un poco de chocolate)	Marcos	
2008	Krabat	Tonda	
2009	John Rabe	Dr. Georg Rosen	
2009	Las madres de Elna	Amaro	
2009	The Countess	István Thurzó	
2009	Inglourious Basterds	Fredrick Zoller	
2009	Lila, Lila	David Kern	
2009	Inglorious Basterds: Stolz der Nation	Friedrich (as Fredrick Zoller)	Video short
2009	Dinosaurier – Gegen uns seht ihr alt aus!	Tobias Hardmann	
2010	King's Road (Kóngavegur 7)	Rupert	
2010	The Coming Days (Die kommenden Tage)	Hans Krämer	
2011	Lessons of a Dream (Der ganz große Traum)	Konrad Koch	
2011	All Together (Et si on vivait tous ensemble?)	Dirk	
2011	Eva	Álex Garel	
2011	Intruders	Father Antonio	
2011	2 Days in New York	The Oak Fairy	
2012	Winning Streak (The Pelayos)	Iván Pelayo	
2012	7 Days in Havana	Leonardo (segment "La tentación de Cecilia)	
2013	Rush	Niki Lauda	
2013	The Fifth Estate	Daniel Domscheit-Berg	
2014	A Most Wanted Man	Maximilian	
2014	The Face of an Angel	Thomas	
2015	Woman in Gold	Hubertus Czernin	
2015	Colonia	Daniel	
2015	Me and Kaminski	Sebastian Zöllner	
2015	Burnt	Tony Balerdi	
2016	Alone in Berlin	Escherich	
2016	Captain America: Civil War	Helmut Zemo	
2016	Killing for Love	Jens Söring	Documentary, voice
2017	The Zookeeper's Wife	Lutz Heck	
2018	The Cloverfield Paradox	Ernst Schmidt	
2018	Entebbe	Wilfried Böse	
2019	My Zoe	Thomas Fischer	Also executive producer
2021	Next Door (Nebenan)	Daniel Weltz	Also director and producer
2021	The King's Man	Erik Jan Hanussen	
2022	All Quiet on the Western Front	Matthias Erzberger	Also executive producer
2023	The Movie Teller	Nansen	
2024	Race for Glory: Audi vs. Lancia	Roland Gumpert	
2024	Eden	Heinz Wittmer	
2026	The Gallerist	TBA	
TBA	The Collaboration †	Bruno Bischofberger	Post-production
TBA	The Entertainment System Is Down †	TBA	Post-production
TBA	Porto Rico †	TBA	Filming

=== Television ===
Year	Title	Role	Notes
1995	Verbotene Liebe	Benji Kirchner	16 episodes
1995	Sven's Secret	TBA	TV movie
1996	Der Pakt – Wenn Kinder töten	Nikolas Koll	TV movie
1997	Freunde fürs Leben	Leander Heiden	4 episodes
1997	Polizeiruf 110	Robert Voigt	Episode: «Der Sohn der Kommissarin»
1998	SOKO München	Knut	Episode: «Ausgetrickst»
1998–2000	Tatort	Achim	2 episodes
1998	Blutiger Ernst	Reinhold Gerwander	TV movie
1999	Hin und weg	David	TV movie
1999	Sturmzeit	Chris Rathenberg	Episode: «Teil 4»
1999	Ein mörderischer Plan	Reini Pfaff	TV movie
2000	Eine öffentliche Affäre	TBA	
2014	The Trip	Patron at Terrace Bar	Episode: «Il Cenobio dei Dogi, Camogli»
2018–2020	The Alienist	Dr. Laszlo Kreizler	Main role
2021	The Falcon and the Winter Soldier	Helmut Zemo	Main Role 5 episodes
2021	Marvel Studios: Assembled	Himself	Documentary; Episode: "Assembled: The Making of The Falcon and the Winter Soldier"
2024	Becoming Karl Lagerfeld	Karl Lagerfeld	Lead role
2024	The Franchise	Eric	Main role
TBA	The Boys from Brazil †	Von Harteneck	

=== Filmmaking ===
Key
†	Denotes films that have not yet been released

Year	Title	Credited as			Notes	Distributor
Year	Title	Director	Writer	Producer	Notes	Distributor
2019	My Zoe	No	No	Yes	Feature film, Executive producer	Warner Bros Pictures, BAC Films, et al.
2021	Next Door (Nebenan)	Yes	No	Yes	Feature film	Curzon, Warner Bros Pictures
2022	All Quiet on the Western Front	No	No	Yes	Executive producer	Netflix

== Awards and nominations ==
Year	Association	Category	Nominated work	Result	Ref
2002	Bavarian Film Awards	Best Young Actor	Das Weisse Rauschen, No Regrets (Nichts Bereuen), Vaya con Dios	Won	
2002	German Film Awards	Best Actor in a Leading Role	Das Weisse Rauschen, No Regrets (Nichts Bereuen), Vaya con Dios	Won	
2002	New Faces Awards	Best Actor	Das Weisse Rauschen, No Regrets (Nichts Bereuen), Vaya con Dios	Won	
2003	Preis der deutschen Filmkritik (German Film Critics Association Awards)	Best Actor	Das Weisse Rauschen, Vaya con Dios	Won	
2003	Bambi Awards	Best Film – National	Good Bye, Lenin!	Won	
2003	European Shooting Stars Award	Top Young Actor	Good Bye, Lenin!	Won	
2003	Jupiter Awards	Best German Actor	Good Bye, Lenin!	Won	
2003	European Film Awards	European Film Award for Best Actor	Good Bye, Lenin!	Won	
2003	European Film Awards	Jameson People's Choice Award for Best Actor	Good Bye, Lenin!	Won	
2003	German Film Awards	Audience Award for Best German Actor	Good Bye, Lenin!	Won	
2003	German Film Awards	Best Actor in a Leading Role	Good Bye, Lenin!, Elefantenherz	Won	
2004	European Film Awards	European Film Award for Best Actor	The Edukators	Nominated	
2004	European Film Awards	Jameson People's Choice Award for Best Actor	Love in Thoughts	Won	
2006	Barcelona Film Awards	Best Actor	Salvador (Puig Antich)	Won	
2007	Butaca Awards	Best Catalan Film Actor	Salvador (Puig Antich)	Nominated	
2007	Cinema Writers Circle Awards	Best Actor	Salvador (Puig Antich)	Nominated	
2007	Fotogramas de Plata	Best Movie Actor	Salvador (Puig Antich)	Nominated	
2007	Goya Awards	Best Actor	Salvador (Puig Antich)	Nominated	
2007	Mestre Mateo Awards	Best Actor	Cargo	Nominated	
2007	Seattle International Film Festival	Best Actor	Salvador (Puig Antich)	Won	
2007	Spanish Actors Union	Best Male Lead Performance	Salvador (Puig Antich)	Nominated	
2009	Phoenix Film Critics Society Awards	Best Acting Ensemble	Inglourious Basterds	Won	
2009	San Diego Film Critics Society Awards	Best Ensemble Performance	Inglourious Basterds	Won	
2010	Central Ohio Film Critics Association Awards	Best Ensemble	Inglourious Basterds	Won	
2010	Screen Actors Guild Award	Outstanding Performance by a Cast in a Motion Picture	Inglourious Basterds	Won	
2010	CinEuphoria Awards	Best Ensemble – International Competition	Inglourious Basterds	Won	
2012	Cinema Writers Circle Awards	Best Actor	Eva	Nominated	
2012	Gaudí Awards	Best Performance by an Actor in a Leading Role	Eva	Nominated	
2012	Goya Awards	Best Actor	Eva	Nominated	
2013	Dallas–Fort Worth Film Critics Association Awards	Best Supporting Actor	Rush	Nominated	
2013	Dublin Film Critics Circle Awards	Best Actor	Rush	Nominated	
2013	San Diego Film Critics Society Awards	Best Supporting Actor	Rush	Nominated	
2013	Washington D.C. Area Film Critics Association Awards	Best Supporting Actor	Rush	Nominated	
2014	Golden Globe Award	Best Supporting Actor – Motion Picture	Rush	Nominated	
2014	British Academy Film Awards	Best Supporting Actor	Rush	Nominated	
2014	Saturn Awards	Best Supporting Actor	Rush	Nominated	
2014	Critics' Choice Movie Awards	Best Supporting Actor	Rush	Nominated	
2014	Empire Awards	Best Supporting Actor	Rush	Nominated	
2014	Jupiter Awards	Best German Actor	Rush	Nominated	
2014	Online Film & Television Association Awards	Best Supporting Actor	Rush	Nominated	
2014	Online Film & Television Association Awards	Best Breakthrough Performance: Male	Rush	Nominated	
2014	Romy Gala	Favorite Actor	Rush	Nominated	
2014	Santa Barbara International Film Festival	Virtuoso Award	Rush	Won	
2014	Screen Actors Guild Award	Best Supporting Actor	Rush	Nominated	
2014	Seattle Film Critics Awards	Best Supporting Actor	Rush	Won	
2016	Jupiter Awards	Best German Actor	Ich und Kaminski	Nominated	
2016	Teen Choice Awards	Choice Movie: Villain	Captain America: Civil War	Nominated	
2019	Golden Globe Awards	Best Actor – Miniseries or Television Film	The Alienist	Nominated	
2019	Satellite Awards	Satellite Awards for Best Actor in a Miniseries or Television Film	The Alienist	Nominated	
2021	Berlin International Film Festival	Golden Bear Best Film	Next Door (Nebenan)	Nominated	
2021	Taormina Film Festival	Cariddi D'Oro – Best Film	Next Door (Nebenan)	Won	
2021	Taormina Film Festival	Polifemo Mask – Best Actor	Next Door (Nebenan)	Won	
2021	Art Film Festival	Blue Angel Best Film	Next Door (Nebenan)	Nominated	
2021	Hollywood Critics Association	Best Supporting Actor in a Streaming Series, Drama	The Falcon and the Winter Soldier	Nominated	
2022	Jupiter Awards	Jury's Special Prize	Next Door (Nebenan)	Won	
2024	16th Gaudí Awards	Best Supporting Actor	The Movie Teller	Nominated	
