= Hinnerk Schönemann =

German actor (born 1974)

- Born: 30 November 1974 (age 51); Rostock, East Germany (now Germany)
- Occupation: Actor
- Years active: 1998–present

Hinnerk Schönemann (born 30 November 1974) is a German actor. He has appeared in more than ninety films since 1998.

== Filmography ==
Film
Year	Title	Role	Notes
2001	Getting My Brother Laid	Mike Klauser	
2002	Amen.	Chess Player	
2002	Baader	Victor	
2002	Kiss and Run	Christo	
2003	Gate to Heaven	Policeman	
2003	Kroko	Eddie	
2004	Hab mich lieb!	Ralf	
2005	Fremde Haut	Uwe	
2005	NVA	Raschke	
2006	Lucy	2. Mann in der Bar	
2006	Happy as One	Bronski	
2006	The Lives of Others	Unterleutnant Axel Stigler	
2006	Emma's Bliss	Henner	
2007	My Führer – The Really Truest Truth about Adolf Hitler	Gestapo Offizier	
2007	Große Lügen!		
2007	Yella	Ben	
2007	The Other Boy	Kommissar Bender	
2008	1st of May: All Belongs to You	Demonstrant	
2009	12 Paces Without a Head	Keule	
2009	Murder on Amrum	Helge Vogt	TV film
2011	Der Himmel hat vier Ecken		
2011	Tom Sawyer	Sheriff	
2011	War Horse	German Soldier called "Peter"	
2012	The Adventures of Huck Finn	Sheriff	
2014	The Whole Shebang	Tim / Tina Birker	
2015	Death of a Girl	Torben Broder	TV film
2016	Bibi & Tina: Girls vs. Boys	Vater Bernhard	
2018	Never Look Away	Werner Blaschke	
2019	Die Drei !!!	Kommissar Peters	

TV series
Year	Title	Role	Notes
2007	Dr. Psycho – Die Bösen, die Bullen, meine Frau und ich	Edmund 'Eddie' Stachowiak / Martin Stachowiak	14 episodes
2014-	Nord bei Nordwest	Hauke Jacobs	over 30
