= Getting My Brother Laid =

2001 film by Sven Taddicken

- Theatrical release poster
- German: Mein Bruder, der Vampir
- Directed by: Sven Taddicken
- Written by: Matthias Pacht
- Produced by: Christian Hünemörder
- Starring: Julia Jentsch; Roman Knižka; Hinnerk Schönemann
- Cinematography: Daniela Knapp
- Edited by: Jens Klüber
- Music by: Putte
- Release dates: October 2001 (Hof International Film Festival); 26 September 2002 (Germany)
- Running time: 94 minutes
- Country: Germany
- Language: German

Getting My Brother Laid (German: Mein Bruder, der Vampir, lit. 'My Brother, the Vampire') is a 2001 German romantic comedy-drama film directed by Sven Taddicken.

== Premise ==
Josch Klauser (Roman Knižka), Mike (Hinnerk Schönemann) and their younger sister Nic (Marie-Luise Schramm) experience ups and downs in search for their first love. Josch, the oldest of the three, is a big fan of Dracula, and mentally handicapped. He falls in love with Nadine (Julia Jentsch), who is the girlfriend of his brother Mike.
