= In Transit (2008 film) =

- Official poster
- Directed by: Tom Roberts
- Written by: Natalia Portnova; Simon van der Borgh
- Produced by: Jimmy de Brabant; Michael Dounaev; Kami Naghdi
- Starring: Thomas Kretschmann; Daniel Brühl; Vera Farmiga; John Malkovich
- Cinematography: Sergei Astakhov
- Edited by: Paul Carlin
- Music by: Dan Jones
- Production companies: Thema Production; Peace Arch Films
- Distributed by: Peace Arch Films
- Release dates: 4 March 2008 (Russia); 31 May 2010 (United Kingdom)
- Running time: 113 minutes
- Countries: Russia; United Kingdom
- Languages: Russian; German; English

In Transit (originally titled In Tranzit) is a 2008 Russian-British drama film based on the true story of German prisoners of war in a Soviet work camp after World War II. The film was directed by Tom Roberts, and stars Thomas Kretschmann, Daniel Brühl, Vera Farmiga, and John Malkovich.

The film was released in Russian cinemas on 4 March 2008 and in the United Kingdom on 31 May 2010.

== Plot ==
In the winter of 1946, in Leningrad, a group of German prisoners of war are sent to a female transit camp by the cruel Russian Colonel Pavlov. When they arrive, the Russian female soldiers show hostility to the prisoners on the grounds that have killed their families and friends; only Dr. Natalia and the cook treat the prisoners with dignity.

Natalia has an agreement with Colonel Pavlov to keep her former lover, who was wounded on the head during the war, in the camp instead of sending him to an institution in Siberia. Pavlov assigns Natalia to discover the members of the SS hiding in the group of prisoners. Natalia and the prisoner Max Bort feel a great attraction for each other, while another prisoner, Klaus Prompst, tries to convince Max to denounce a couple of prisoners to satisfy Pavlov.

Natalia convinces the businessman Yakov to organise an orchestra with the prisoners; they are invited to a ball, where the lonely women who survived the war get to dance with the Germans. After the ball, Natalia convinces Officer Elena to let the prisoners spend the night with the women. Natalia has a one-night stand with Max and while he sneaks back to the quarters, he is attacked by Klaus but saved by Natalia, who then discovers who Klaus actually is. Pavlov interrupts the fight between Max and Klaus. Klaus then commits suicide, being hit by a train. Max and Pavlov discuss who Klaus really was and the reputation he had. Pavlov calls Natalia a true soviet for completing her mission, revealing the truth to Max. Max is taken away heart broken. The next day, Max is returned and Natalia's former lover is taken to Siberia. They eventually receive the news that Stalin made a deal and the POWs will be going home.

== Cast ==
- Thomas Kretschmann as Max Bort, a German POW
- Vera Farmiga as Dr. Natalia, a Soviet officer
- Daniel Brühl as Klaus Prompst, a German POW
- Natalie Press as Zina Tyomina, a kindly citizen cook who fraternizes with a POW
- Ingeborga Dapkūnaitė as Cpl. Vera Tyurina, an embittered Soviet Corporal whose whole family and sister Sasha were killed by German soldiers
- John Lynch as Yakov, a Russian-Jewish businessman
- Thekla Reuten as Officer Elena, a Soviet Lieutenant who has an affair with Ivan
- Evgeny Mironov as Andrei, Natalia's injured husband
- Tatyana Yakovenko as Capt. Olga Alexandrova, the senior female Soviet officer in charge of the transit camp
- John Malkovich as Colonel Pavlov, to whom Alexandrova reports
- Guy Flanagan as Hans

== Production ==
In Transit was directed by Tom Roberts, from a screenplay written by Natalia Portnova and Simon van der Borgh. The film was produced by Jimmy de Brabant, Michael Dounaev and Kami Naghdi. Principal photography took place over five weeks in St. Petersburg, Russia in March and April 2006.

== Release ==
The film was sold at the Cannes Film Market in 2007 and was not subject to theatrical release thereafter. It was distributed straight to DVD by Peace Arch Films in Russia on 4 March 2008, Peace Arch Home Entertainment in the United States on 5 May 2009 and Peace Arch Films and Universal Pictures Home Entertainment in the United Kingdom on 31 May 2010. Pan Vision released the film straight to DVD in Denmark on 30 March 2010, Sweden on 31 March 2010 and Finland on 1 April 2010. The film was also released on DVD in Japan, Australia, the Netherlands and Belgium.

== Reception ==
In Transit received mixed reviews from film critics. The film was described by film critic Robert Roten as one where "strong acting helps overcome a meandering, but unpredictable plot. It is a solid international cast, and a story that, while not compelling, will keep you guessing right up to the end. It has an air of authenticity about it and it works for the most part." By way of contrast, another critic, Don Groves, saw the film as "almost totally devoid of tension, marred by slack pacing, thinly developed characters and banal dialogue."
