= Hut in the Woods =

- Film poster
- German: Die Summe meiner einzelnen Teile
- Directed by: Hans Weingartner
- Starring: Peter Schneider; Timur Massold
- Release date: 7 October 2011 (RIFF)
- Running time: 117 minutes
- Country: Germany
- Language: German

Hut in the Woods (German: Die Summe meiner einzelnen Teile, lit. 'The sum of my individual parts') is a 2011 German drama film directed by Hans Weingartner.

== Cast ==
- Peter Schneider - Martin
- Timur Massold - Viktor
- Henrike von Kuick - Lena
- Eleonore Weisgerber - Doctor
- Andreas Leupold - Martin's father
- Thomas Dannemann - Banker
- Robert Schupp - Personalchef
- Julia Jentsch - Petra
