= My Zoe =

- Film poster
- Directed by: Julie Delpy
- Written by: Julie Delpy
- Produced by: Dominique Boutonnat; Hubert Caillard; Malte Grunert; Andrew Levitas; Gabrielle Tana
- Starring: Julie Delpy; Richard Armitage; Daniel Brühl; Gemma Arterton; Saleh Bakri; Lindsay Duncan; Sophia Ally
- Cinematography: Stéphane Fontaine
- Edited by: Isabelle Devinck
- Production companies: Amusement Park Films; Baby Cow Productions; Electrick Films; Magnolia Mae Films; Metalwork Pictures; Warner Bros. Film Productions Germany; Canal+; Cine+
- Distributed by: Warner Bros. Pictures (Austria, Germany and Switzerland); Signature Entertainment (United Kingdom); BAC Films (France)
- Release dates: 7 September 2019 (TIFF); 14 November 2019 (Germany); 5 October 2020 (United Kingdom)
- Running time: 102 minutes
- Countries: United Kingdom; France; Germany
- Languages: English; French
- Box office: $50,820

My Zoe is a 2019 drama film written and directed by Julie Delpy. It stars Delpy, Richard Armitage, Daniel Brühl, Gemma Arterton, Saleh Bakri, Lindsay Duncan and Sophia Ally.

The film had its world premiere at the Toronto International Film Festival on 7 September 2019. It was released in Germany on 14 November 2019, by Warner Bros. Pictures and in the United Kingdom on 5 October 2020, by Signature Entertainment.

== Premise ==
Isabelle (Julie Delpy), a geneticist recovering from a toxic marriage, is raising her only daughter, Zoe, with her contentious ex-husband (Richard Armitage). Zoe means everything to her mother and so when tragedy strikes the fractured family, Isabelle uses her expertise to take matters into her own hands. As this mother's love knows no bounds, Isabelle travels to Russia in seeking the help of a world-renowned fertility physician (Daniel Brühl) who Isabelle believes can help bring back her little girl.

== Cast ==
- Julie Delpy as Isabelle Perrault-Lewis
- Gemma Arterton as Laura Fischer
- Daniel Brühl as Thomas Fischer
- Richard Armitage as James Lewis
- Sophia Ally as Zoe Perrault-Lewis
- Saleh Bakri as Akil Beser
- Lindsay Duncan as Kathy
- Lucas Prisor as Young Doctor
- Patrick Güldenberg as Professor Hoffman
- Jördis Triebel as Dr. Hazs
- Vladimir Burlakov as Anton

== Production ==
Julie Delpy had begun conceptualising the film 20 years prior to the December 2016 announcement she was set to write, direct and star in the film, alongside Gemma Arterton, Daniel Brühl and Lior Ashkenazi. Richard Armitage and Sophia Ally were added in February 2017. Shooting was due to begin in the spring of that year, however development on the film stalled, and in December that year Delpy announced it was due to the film's major financier pulling out of the film in November, which she referred to as being for sexist reasons.

New financing was found by the time filming began in May 2018, with Saleh Bakri and Lindsay Duncan added to the cast.

== Release ==
The film had its world premiere at the Toronto International Film Festival in the Platform Prize program on 7 September 2019. It was released in Germany on 14 November 2019, by Warner Bros. Pictures, and in the United Kingdom on 5 October 2020, by Signature Entertainment.

The film was set to screen at the Tribeca Film Festival in April 2020, however, the festival was cancelled due to the COVID-19 pandemic. It was released in the United States on 26 February 2021, by Blue Fox Entertainment.

== Reception ==
On review aggregator Rotten Tomatoes, the film holds an approval rating of 71% based on 41 reviews, with an average rating of 6/10. The site's critical consensus reads, "Storytelling isn't My Zoe's strength, but the depth of feeling that writer-director-star Julie Delpy brings to her characters helps offset this drama's flaws." On Metacritic, the film has a weighted average score of 59 out of 100, based on 10 critics, indicating "mixed or average reviews".

IndieWire raved that “Delpy’s ability to believe in both her audience and her wild story remains compelling throughout the film... Delpy earns every minute of the story, one that shows off her ability (and desire) mix things up with a fresh eye.”
