= The White Sound =

- Directed by: Hans Weingartner; Tobias Ammann (co-director)
- Screenplay by: Hans Weingartner; Tobias Ammann; Katrin Blum
- Starring: Daniel Brühl
- Release date: 31 January 2002 (Germany)
- Running time: 101 minutes
- Country: Germany
- Language: German

The White Sound (German: Das weisse Rauschen) is the directorial debut of Austrian-born German director Hans Weingartner. The film stars Daniel Brühl, who won the German Film Award for best lead actor in 2002 for his portrayal of Lukas, a 21-year-old man suffering from schizophrenia. It was released in German cinemas on 31 January 2002.

Highly praised by critics, the film won several other awards including the Max Ophüls Prize for best feature film debut. The film originated as a project at the Academy of Media Arts Cologne.

== See also ==
- List of films featuring hallucinogens
