= Corinna Schnitt =

German filmmaker, artist, and professor (born 1964)

- Born: 1964 (age 61–62); Duisburg, Germany
- Education: Hochschule für Gestaltung Offenbach am Main, Kunstakademie Düsseldorf
- Known for: Video Art, Experimental Film
- Website: http://www.corinnaschnitt.de

Corinna Schnitt (born in 1964) is a German filmmaker, artist, and professor. Her films, which are experimental in nature, have been presented in a variety of festivals, solo and group exhibitions at diverse international venues. Since 2009, she has been a professor at the Academy of Fine Arts in Braunschweig, Germany. Her 2003 film, Living a Beautiful Life, has been recognized with a German Film Critic's Award in 2005 and an award from the International Short Film Festival Oberhausen in 2004.

== Biography ==
Corinna Schnitt was born in Duisburg, Germany in 1964. Before adopting film as her primary medium, she trained as a wood-carver from 1986 to 1989, when she held an apprenticeship in Michelstadt, Germany. She also studied at the Hochschule für Gestaltung Offenbach am Main, and the Kunstakademie Düsseldorf, receiving her Master's degree from there in 1995. In June 1997, she founded Schnittraum, an independent storefront gallery and community art space in Cologne, Germany. She has received a number of awards for her experimental films. She has been a professor of Film and Video at the Academy of Fine Arts in Braunschweig since 2009.

== Work ==
=== Style ===
Schnitt's films depict a range of subjects, often following a narrative form with human protagonists. She experiments with a variety of narrative and technical techniques. Many of her works start with a focus on the banal activities in daily life before pushing them to "a point of absurdity" or humour through a variety of film techniques. A few examples of the diverse themes included in Schnitt's films range from "the listless banality of suburbia," unspoken social norms, the human body and the natural environment. She has shared in interviews that some of her work comes from her interest in how public spaces are activated by civilians. If speaking, characters in her films communicate in English or German.

=== Notable films ===
==== Whispering to Flowers or, Zu Blumen flüstern (2015) ====
Whispering to Flowers (also referenced as Zu Blumen flüstern, in German) is a recent body of work which continues in Schnitt's exploration into nature and social conventions. This series of films each follow the same general format. In these works, which take place indoors, a floral bouquet is placed in the center of the frame and is repetitively "caressed" and spoken to softly by a young protagonist (most of them are women). The series demonstrates a few of the conventions commonly used in ASMR video content.

==== Living a Beautiful Life (2003) ====
Living a Beautiful Life explores themes of idealism, good fortune, and the optimism of youth. The film opens upon a utopian garden scene with nude infants and young animals enjoying the idyllic surroundings. Following the title sequence, the film introduces an attractive well-to-do couple, who describe their life and goals in various locations of a large domestic property. The film's script is derived from interviews conducted by Schnitt with teenagers living in California. Schnitt asked her young subjects what constitutes a good life to them. As Kay von Keitz put it, "the ideal world is a fiction that stems from the teenagers' ideas of professional success, family happiness and perfect society, which in turn is fostered by fictions and clichés: fiction reflects fiction. The perfect happiness has oppressive features." The film has won several award and prizes.

==== Get out of your Clothes or, Raus aus seinen Kleidern (1998–1999) ====
Get out of his Clothes (translated from: Raus aus seinen Kleidern) was shot on 16mm film. The film opens with a woman shaking off her clothing on an outdoor apartment balcony and slowly zooms out revealing the neighbouring buildings. As the camera zooms out even further, the woman becomes smaller in the frame until she is nearly invisible. A woman's voice is heard throughout, speaking in German. It may appear that the narration is the inner monologue of the woman who is on the balcony. Towards the end of the film, the zoom out passes through a window which reveals a domestic interior of another apartment, where the camera is revealed to be located. From within this final interior setting, a seated woman is revealed to the left of a large window. It becomes evident that it has been her voice speaking for the duration of the video. According to the artist Siebren de Haan, "Schnitt's camera travels through architectonic barriers between private and public space," highlighting the themes of domesticity, public space and everyday urban dwelling in the video."

The film also references the 1967 film Wavelength by Canadian artist Michael Snow through its minimal structure and use of a slow zoom technique. Unlike in Wavelength, where the camera zooms in from one end of a room to another, Raus aus seinen Kleidern features a zoom out which passes through different architectural structures.

== Career ==
Schnitt's work has been recognized by a number of public and private institutions.

=== Exhibitions ===
Since the 1990s, Schnitt has extensively exhibited her work at a variety of solo and group exhibitions held at galleries and museums. She has been included in over one hundred group exhibitions, internationally. She has also held solo exhibitions internationally, including at the Philipp von Rosen Gallery in 2019 and 2016, Sprengel Museum in 2015, Wilhelm-Hack-Museum in 2012, Kunstverein Wolfenbüttel in 2012, Museum Ludwig in 2007, and The Chinati Foundation in 2004.

=== Collections ===
Schnitt's work is included in several public and private art collections, including that of Kunsthalle Hamburg, MUSAC, ZKM Center for Art and Media Karlsruhe, Museum Ludwig in Cologne, Germany, Museum für Moderne Kunst in Arnhem, Netherlands, and Neuer Berliner Kunstverein (NBK) in Berlin, Germany.

=== Residencies ===
- Edith Russ Site for Media Art in Oldenburg, Germany in 2006.
- Villa Massimo, Casa Baldi in Rome, Italy in 2005.
- Chianti Foundation in Marfa, Texas in 2004.
- Villa Aurora Residency in Los Angeles, California in 2003.
- Schloss Academy Solitude Residency in Frankfurt, Germany in 2001.

=== Awards ===
- Edith-Russ Stipend for Media Art in 2006.
- German Film Critic's Award for Experimental Film (for Living a Beautiful Life) in 2005.
- Else Heiliger Fund Grant in 2005.
- Konrad Adenauer Foundation Scholarship in 2005.
- First place in the German Competition of the International Short Film Festival Oberhausen (for Living a Beautiful Life) in 2004.
- North Rhine-Westphalia Grant in 2004.
- German Film Critic's Award for Experimental Film (for Das schlafende Mädchen) in 2002.
- HAS Grieshaber Award in 2001.
- DG Bank Prize for Video and Film (Honourable Mention) in 2000.
- International Media Artist Prize, ZKM (for Schönen guten Tag) in 2000.
- Third place in the International Short Film Festival Oberhausen (for Raus aus seinen Kleidern) in 2000.
- The Eisenstein Award at the International Short Film Festival Wilhelmshaven (for Zwischen vier und sechs) in 1998.
- Büro Grafenberg Studio Grant in Art and Architecture in 1997.
