= Lila, Lila =

- Directed by: Alain Gsponer
- Screenplay by: Alex Buresch
- Story by: Martin Suter
- Produced by: Andreas Fallscheer
- Starring: Daniel Brühl; Hannah Herzsprung; Henry Hübchen; Kirsten Block
- Cinematography: Mattias Fleischer
- Edited by: Barbara Gies
- Music by: Max Richter
- Release date: December 17, 2009
- Running time: 104 minutes
- Country: Germany
- Language: German

Lila, Lila is a 2009 German film starring Daniel Brühl and Hannah Herzsprung. It is based on the novel Lila, Lila by Martin Suter.

At various film festivals and international screenings the film was sometimes known under the title My Words, My Lies, My Love or My Words, My Lies – My Love.

The American distributor is Corinth Releasing.

== Plot ==
The film starts with a waiter named David Kern who, in a desperate move to impress Marie, passes off a manuscript he found as his own. However, trouble comes when the real author comes after him. The film is based on a novel of the same name by Swiss author Martin Suter.

== Cast ==
- Daniel Brühl as David Kern
- Hannah Herzsprung as Marie
- Henry Hübchen as Jacky Stocker
- Kirsten Block as Karin Kohler

== See also ==
- The Words (film), a 2012 American film with a similar plot
