= Cargo (2006 film) =

2006 film by Clive Gordon

- Film poster
- Directed by: Clive Gordon
- Written by: Paul Laverty
- Produced by: Andrea Calderwood; Juan Gordon
- Starring: Peter Mullan; Daniel Brühl; Luis Tosar
- Cinematography: Sean Bobbitt
- Music by: Stephen Warbeck
- Distributed by: Wild Bunch Pictures
- Release date: January 24, 2006
- Running time: 91 minutes
- Countries: Spain; Sweden; United Kingdom
- Languages: English; Spanish

Cargo is a 2006 thriller film. It was directed by Clive Gordon, produced by Andrea Calderwood and Juan Gordon, and written by Paul Laverty. The film features the actors Peter Mullan (as Brookes), Daniel Brühl (as Chris), Luis Tosar (as Baptist), Samuli Edelmann (as Rhombus), Nikki Amuka-Bird (as Subira) and Gary Lewis (as Herman).

== Plot ==
Cargo tells the tale of a young man who has gotten into trouble in Africa and because of this he decides to stow away on a cargo ship leaving for Europe. During this voyage, sailors on the ship began to disappear with no apparent reason and the ship's depraved captain seems to have the answers.
