= Julia Jentsch =

German actress (born 1978)

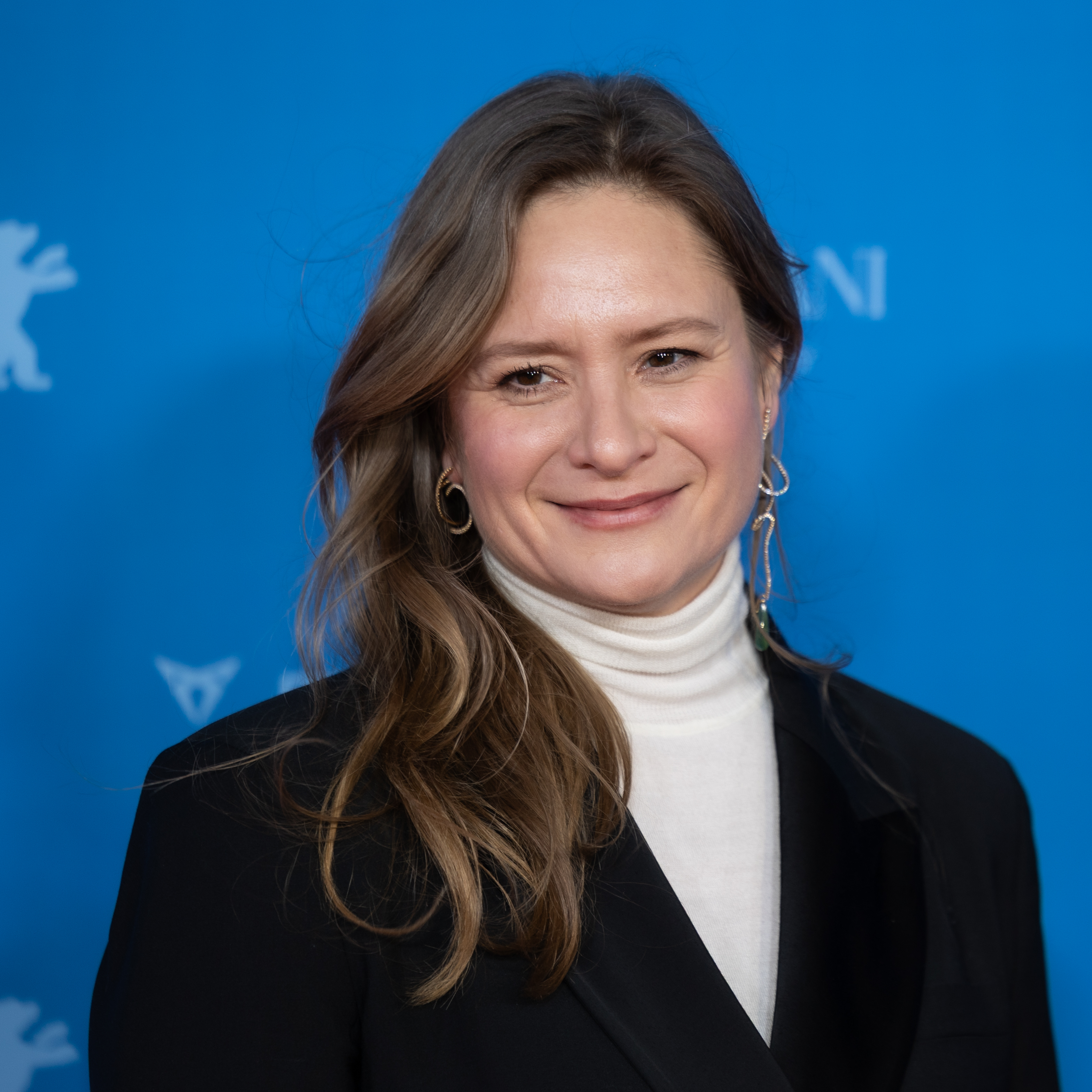
- Jentsch in 2026
- Born: 20 February 1978 (age 48); West Berlin, West Germany
- Education: Hochschule Ernst Busch
- Occupation: Actress
- Years active: 1999–present
- Height: 1.65 m (5 ft 5 in)
- Spouse: Christian Hablützel (2012-present)
- Children: 1

Julia Jentsch (German pronunciation: [ˈjuːli̯a ˈjɛntʃ]; born 20 February 1978) is a German actress. She has received awards including the Silver Bear, European Film Award, and Lola. She is best known for Sophie Scholl – The Final Days, The Edukators and I Served the King of England.

== Career ==
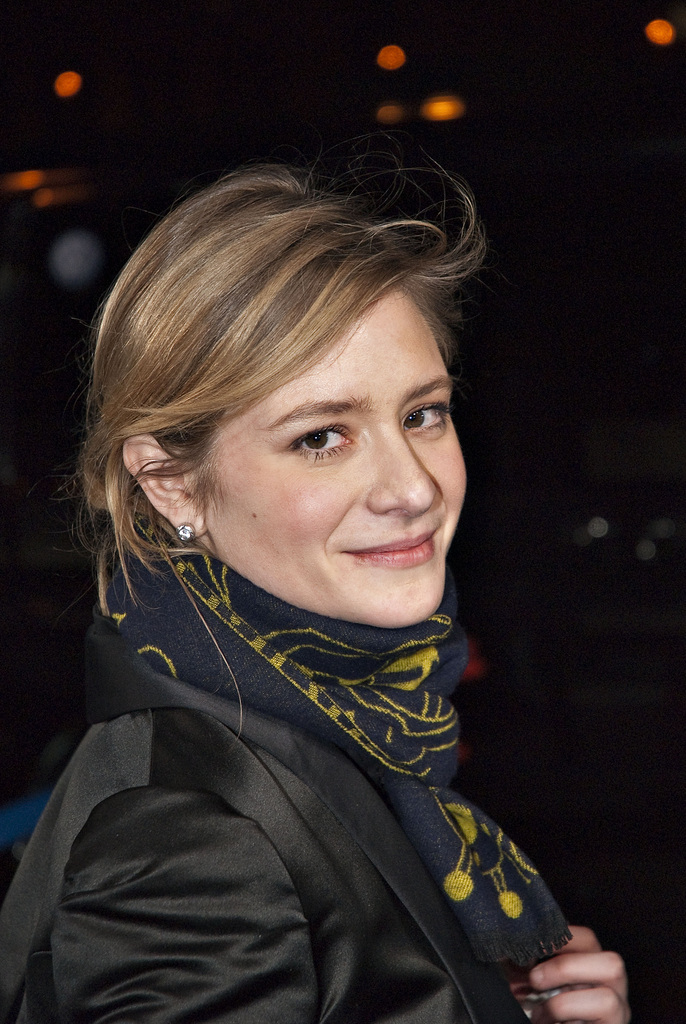
Julia Jentsch at the Berlin International Film Festival 2008

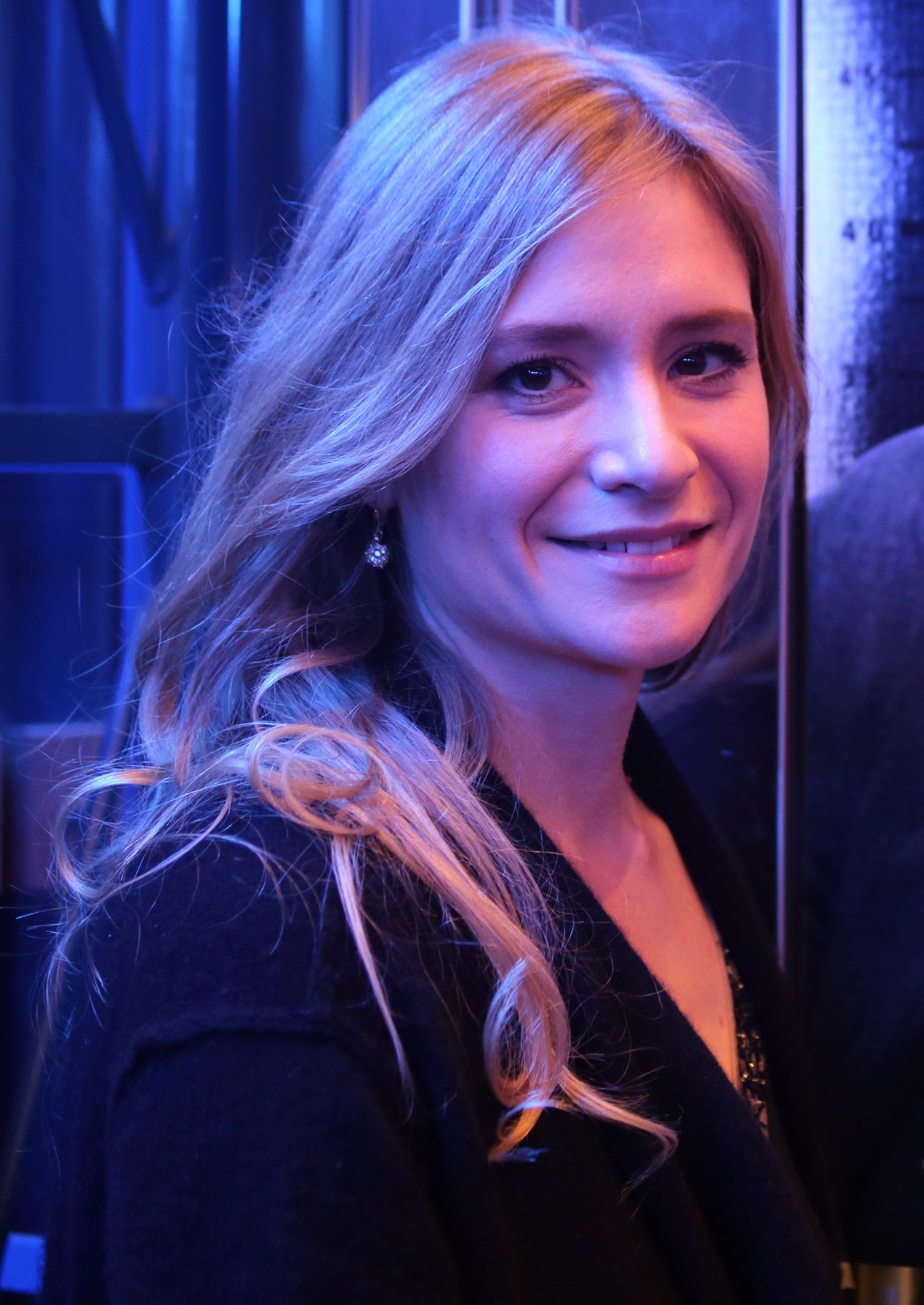
Julia Jentsch at the Vienna International Film Festival 2012

Jentsch was born into a family of lawyers in West Berlin and began her actor training in Berlin at the Hochschule Ernst Busch, a drama school. Her first prominent screen role was in the 2004 cult film The Edukators, starring opposite Daniel Brühl.

Jentsch garnered further attention playing Sophie Scholl in the 2005 film Sophie Scholl – The Final Days, which was nominated for an Academy Award for Best Foreign Language Film. In an interview, Jentsch said that playing the role was "an honour." She won Best Actress at the European Film Awards, at the German Film Awards (a.k.a. Lolas) and a Silver Bear at the Berlin Film Festival for her role as Sophie Scholl.

She was decorated with the Cross of the Order of Merit of the Federal Republic of Germany.

== Personal life ==
Jentsch has been married to the freelance German-Swiss artist and personality trainer Christian Hablützel since 2012. They have a daughter and live near Zurich.

== Selected filmography ==
- Angry Kisses (2000) - Katrin
- Julietta (2001) - Nicole
- Getting My Brother Laid, a.k.a. My Brother the Vampire (2001) - Nadine
- Tatort (TV) (2004) - Johanna Kemmerlang
- The Edukators (2004) - Jule
- Downfall, a.k.a. Der Untergang (2004) - Hanna Potrowski
- Schneeland (2005) - Ina
- Sophie Scholl – The Final Days (2005) - Sophie Scholl
- The Crown Prince (TV) (2006) - Sarah Maisel
- I Served the King of England (2006) - Líza
- Suddenly Gina (TV) (2007) - Angelina 'Gina' Franke
- 33 Scenes From Life (2008) - Julia Szczesna
- Effi Briest (2009) - Effi von Briest
- The Murder Farm (2009) - Kathrin
- Here Comes Lola! (2010) - 'Vicky' Viktualia Veloso
- Chalet Girl (2011) - The Race Starter (uncredited)
- Hut in the Woods (2011) - Petra
- Hannah Arendt (2012) - Lotte Köhler
- The Strange Case of Wilhelm Reich (2012) - Eva Reich
- Kokowääh 2 (2013) - Nicks Mutter
- Sovsem ne prostaya istoriya (2013)
- Monsoon Baby (2014) - Nina
- The Chosen Ones (2014) - Petra Grust
- Men Have to Go through This (2015) - Lena
- All of a Sudden (2016) - Laura
- 24 Weeks (2016) - Astrid
- The Have-Nots (2016) - Isabelle
- Der Pass (a.k.a. Pagan Peak, 2019) - Ellie Stocker
- Lindenberg! Mach dein Ding (2020) - Hermine Lindenberg
- What Marielle Knows (2025) – Julia, In competition at the 75th Berlin International Film Festival

== Awards ==
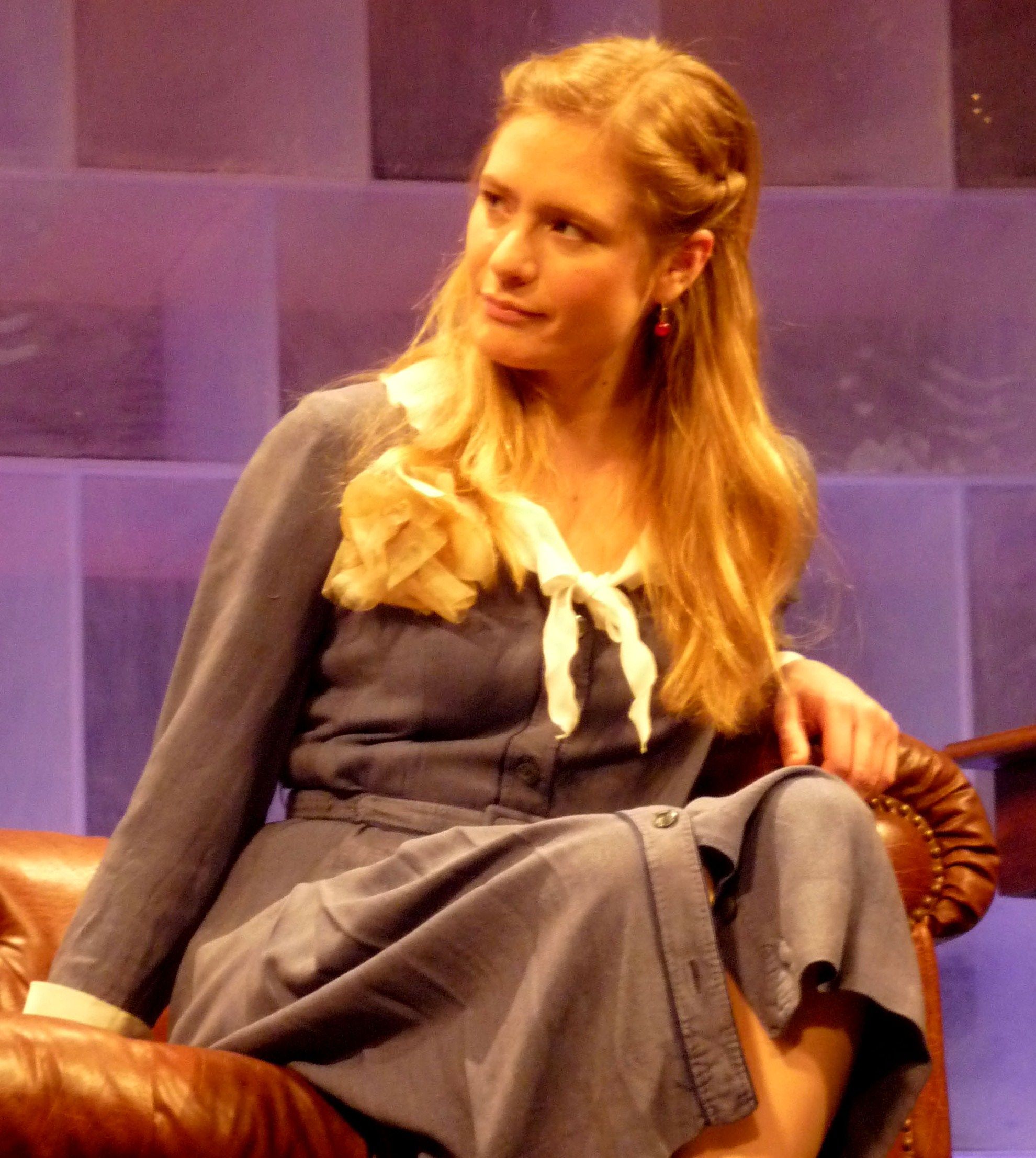
Julia Jentsch as Major Barbara

- 2004 Bavarian Film Award for Best New Actress.
- 2005 Film Award in Gold at the German Film Awards as Best Actress for portraying the role of Sophie Scholl.
- 2005 European Film Awards for Best Actress for the film Sophie Scholl – The Final Days.
- Best Actress for the film Sophie Scholl – The Final Days at the 55th Berlin International Film Festival (2005).
- 2018 Bavarian TV Awards for Best actress for her role in Das Verschicken
