= Lucy (2006 film) =

- Directed by: Henner Winckler
- Written by: Henner Winckler; Stefan Kriekhaus
- Starring: Kim Schnitzer; Gordon Schmidt; Feo Aladag; Polly Hauschild; Ninjo Borth; Ganeshi Becks; Jakob Bieber; Klara Manzel; Jakob Panzek; Annette Tolzmann; Marc Zwinz; Rahel Ohm; Sophie Kempe
- Release date: 14 February 2006 (BIFF)
- Running time: 1h 33min
- Country: Germany
- Language: German

Lucy is a 2006 German drama film directed by Henner Winckler.

== Plot ==
Maggy lives in Berlin. She is 18 years old, lives with her mother Eva and has an 8 month old daughter called Lucy. Maggy has a hard time dealing with the responsibility as a mother as she is still very young herself. She didn't finish school and doesn't want to anything to do with the father. If her mother Eva would not support her, her life would be even bleaker than it already is. Maggy still manages to go to a disco with her girlfriend from time to time. During one of these nights she meets Gordon and falls in love with the young man. Gordon stands on his own two feet, works and has his own apartment, although he isn't much older than Maggy.

== Cast ==
- Kim Schnitzer - Maggy
- Gordon Schmidt - Gordon
- Feo Aladag - Eva
- Polly Hauschild - Lucy
- Ninjo Borth - Mike
- Ganeshi Becks - Nadine
- Jakob Bieber - Daniel
- Klara Manzel - Steffi
- Gerdy Zint - Gordons first girlfriend
