= Hans Weingartner =

Austrian film director, film producer and author

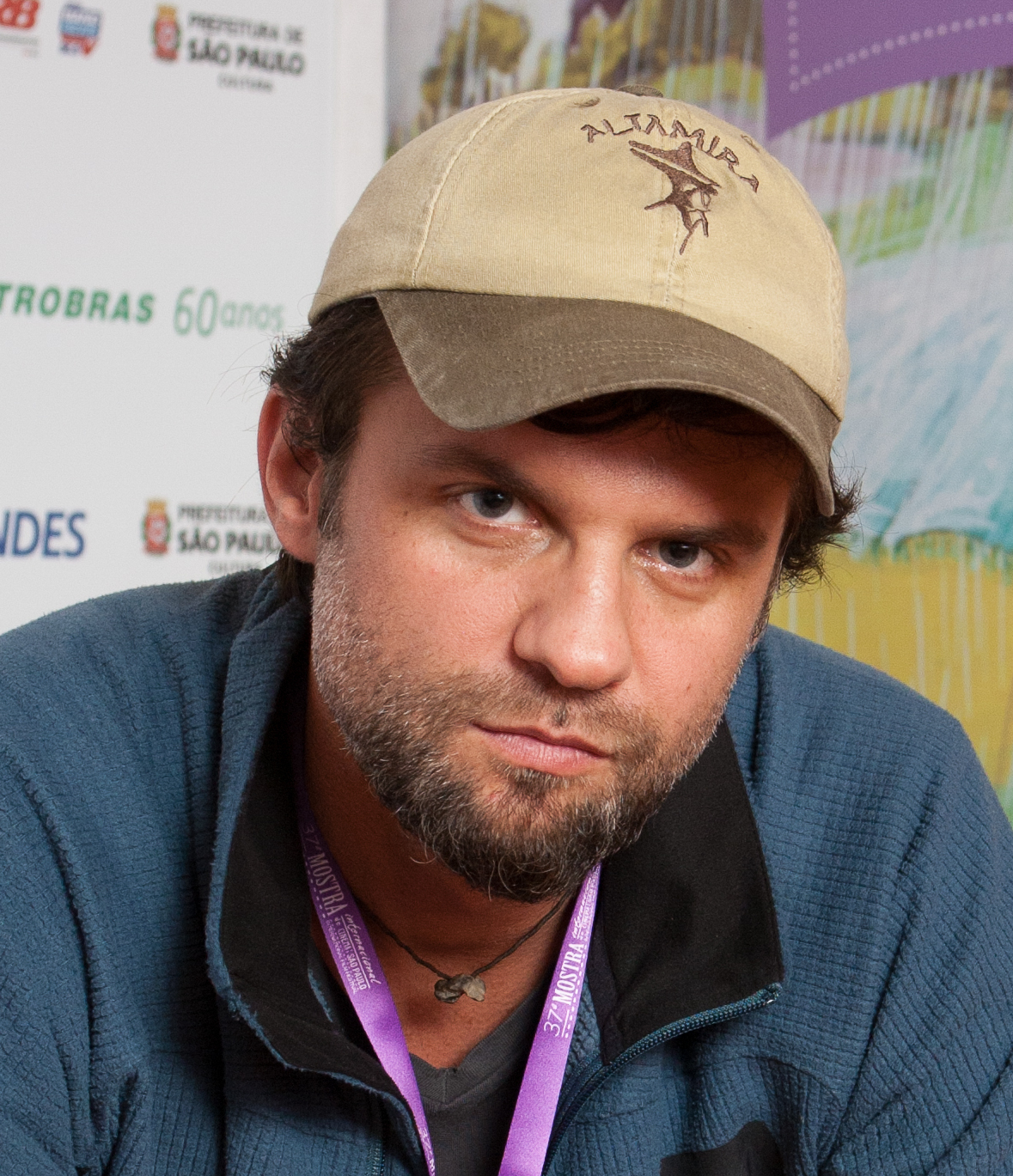
Weingartner in 2013

Hans Weingartner (born 2 November 1977) is an author, director and producer of films. Born in Feldkirch, Vorarlberg, he attended the Austrian Association of Cinematography in Vienna and earned a diploma as a camera assistant. Later, he studied film at the Academy of Media Arts KHM in Cologne, Germany. He also studied neuroscience at the University of Vienna and graduated from the neurosurgical department at the Free University of Berlin’s Steglitz Clinic.

== Filmography ==
=== Full length feature films ===
- The White Sound (Das weisse Rauschen, 2001)
- The Edukators (Die fetten Jahre sind vorbei, 2004)
- Reclaim Your Brain (Free Rainer – Dein Fernseher lügt, 2007)
- Germany 09 (Segment "Gefährder", 2009)
- Hut in the Woods (Die Summe meiner einzelnen Teile, 2011)
- 303 (303, 2018)

== Awards ==
- 2001 First Steps Award for Das weisse Rauschen as Best Picture
- 2001 Babelsberger Medienpreis for Das weisse Rauschen
- 2001 Filmfestival Max Ophüls Prize for Das weisse Rauschen as Best Film
- 2002 German Film Award for Das weisse Rauschen as Best Feature Film
- 2003 German Film Critics Award for Best Debut Film for Das weisse Rauschen
- 2004 Nomination The Edukators for the Golden Palm at the Cannes Film Festival
- 2004 German Film Critics Award for The Edukators as Best Feature Film
- 2004 Förderpreis Neues Deutsches Kino for Best Director and Best Script for The Edukators
- 2004 Jury Prize at the Cape Town World Cinema Festival for The Edukators
- 2004 Prize of the DEFA-Stiftung
- 2005 Audience Award at the Miami International Film Festival for The Edukators
- 2005 German Film Award in Silver / Silver Lola for The Edukators as Best Feature Film and Best Director
- 2012 Nomination for German Film Award in the category Best Director for Hut in the Woods
- 2012 Nomination for German Film Award in the category Best Feature Film for Hut in the Woods
- 2018 Regiepreis Ludwigshafen for 303
