= DE magazine Deutschland =

German magazine

DE magazine Deutschland was a magazine of culture, politics, business and science in Germany. It was a bimonthly magazine published in German, English, French, Spanish, Hebrew, Hungarian, Japanese, Polish, Turkish, among the others. It was styled DE Magazin Deutschland and DE magazine Deutschland, respectively. The Federal Foreign Office in Berlin supported it and it also conveyed general opinions of the German government. The magazine was based in Frankfurt but aimed at an international rather than domestic readership.

The magazine had once more than 1.5 million readers in 172 countries across the world. Some 32% of the subscribers occupied executive positions in industry while 40% were at the forefront of politics and scientific research.

The magazine was previously titled as Deutschland : Forum für Politik, Kultur und Wirtschaft, which in turn used to be Deutschland : Zeitschrift für Politik, Kultur, Wirtschaft und Wissenschaft, which itself is a continuation of the original West German periodical that dates back to the 1960s, Scala: A Periodical from the Federal Republic of Germany (Scala : Zeitschrift aus Deutschland).
