= The Poll Diaries =

2010 film

- Directed by: Chris Kraus
- Written by: Chris Kraus; Oda Schaefer
- Produced by: Alexandra Kordes; Meike Kordes
- Starring: Paula Beer
- Cinematography: Daniela Knapp
- Edited by: Uta Schmidt
- Music by: Annette Focks
- Production companies: Kordes & Kordes Film GmbH; MSM Studios
- Distributed by: Bavaria Film
- Release date: 16 September 2010 (Toronto)
- Running time: 129 minutes
- Country: Germany
- Language: German
- Box office: $1 million

The Poll Diaries (German: Poll) is a 2010 German drama film directed by Chris Kraus. The Poll Diaries was the most expensive film that had ever been made in Estonia at the time. Later, Truth and Justice (2019) became the most expensive Estonian film with a budget of 2.5 million euros.

== Cast ==
- Paula Beer as Oda von Siering
- Edgar Selge as Ebbo von Siering
- Tambet Tuisk as Schnaps
- Jeanette Hain as Milla von Siering
- Richy Müller as Mechmershausen
- Enno Trebs as Paul von Siering
- Yevgeni Sitokhin as Hauptmann Karpow
- Susi Stach as Gudrun Koskull
- Erwin Steinhauer as Professor Plötz
- Michael Kreihsl as Professor Hasenreich
- Gudrun Ritter as Oda Schaefer
