= Daniela Knapp =

Austrian cinematographer

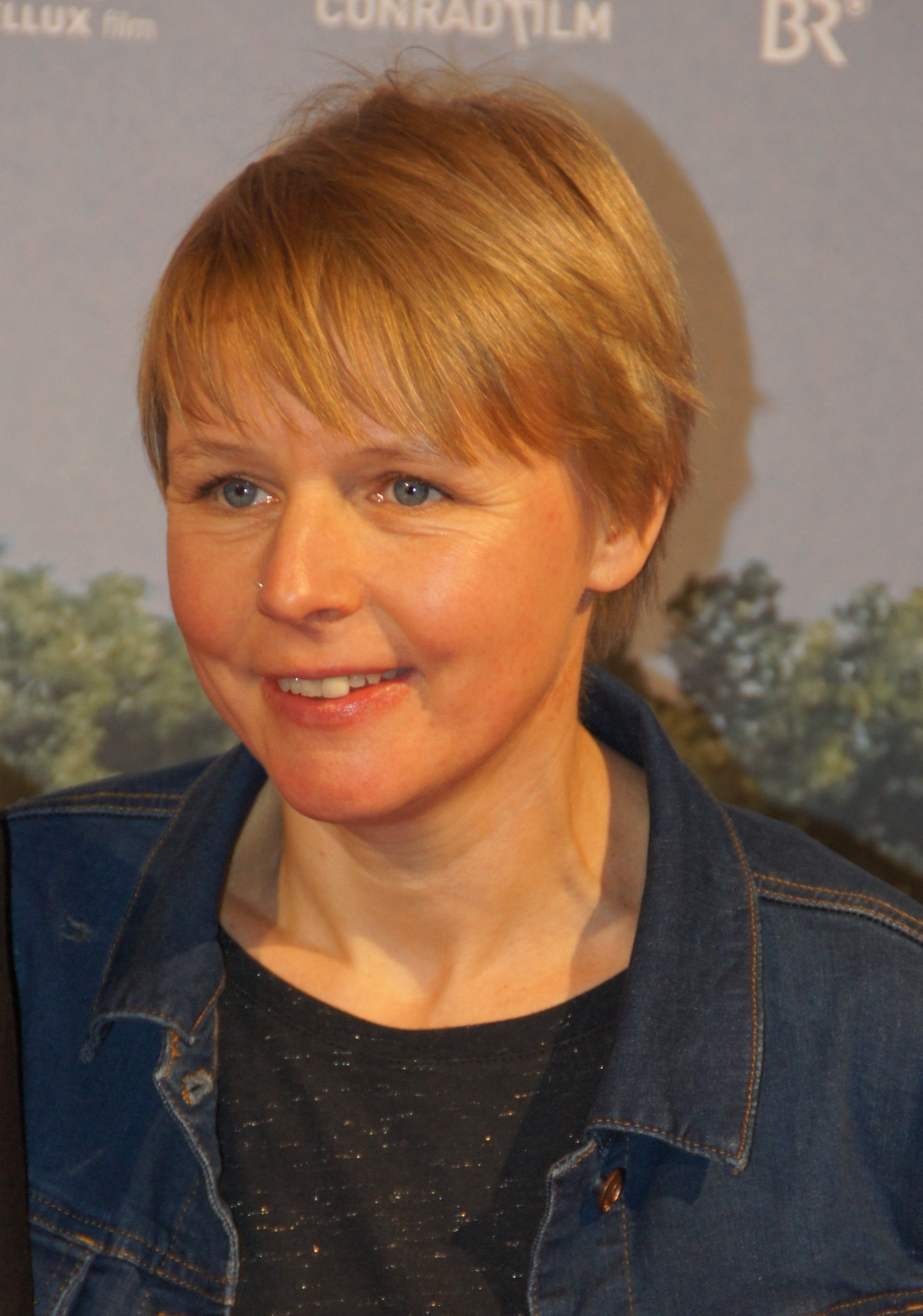

Daniela Knapp (born 19 October 1972) is an Austrian cinematographer. Her film credits include Eine Insel namens Udo, Edeltraud und Theodor, The Poll Diaries and Emma's Bliss.
