= Chlotrudis Award for Best Movie =

American film awards

- Awarded for: Best Movie
- Location: United States
- First award: 1995; 28 years ago
- Currently held by: After Yang
- Website: chlotrudis.org

The Chlotrudis Award for Best Movie is an annual award presented by the Chlotrudis Society for Independent Films, a non-profit organization, founded in 1994, that recognizes achievements in independent and world cinema. The awards were first presented in 1995, and were named after founder Michael Colford and his boyfriend Trent's two cats, Chloe and Gertrudis.

== Winners and nominees ==
=== 1990s ===
Year	Film	Director	Producer(s)	Country
1995 (1st)
1995 (1st)	The Adventures of Priscilla, Queen of the Desert	Stephan Elliott	Al Clark, Michael Hamlyn	Australia
1995 (1st)	Bullets Over Broadway	Woody Allen	Robert Greenhut	United States
1995 (1st)	Little Women	Gillian Armstrong	Denise Di Novi	United States
1995 (1st)	Pulp Fiction	Quentin Tarantino	Lawrence Bender	United States
1995 (1st)	Vanya on 42nd Street	Louis Malle	Fred Berner	United States
1996 (2nd)
1996 (2nd)	Dead Man Walking	Tim Robbins	Jon Kilik, Tim Robbins, Rudd Simmons	United States
1996 (2nd)	Amateur	Hal Hartley	Hal Hartley, Ted Hope	United States; United Kingdom; France
1996 (2nd)	Babe	Chris Noonan	Bill Miller, George Miller, Doug Mitchell	Australia; United States; United Kingdom
1996 (2nd)	Jeffrey	Christopher Ashley	Mark Balsam, Victoria Maxwell, Mitchell Maxwell, Paul Rudnick	United States
1996 (2nd)	The Secret of Roan Inish	John Sayles	Sarah Green, Maggie Renzi	United States; Ireland
1996 (2nd)	Sense and Sensibility	Ang Lee	Lindsay Doran, James Schamus	United Kingdom
1997 (3rd)
1997 (3rd)	Sling Blade	Billy Bob Thornton	Larry Meistrich, David L. Bushell, Brandon Rosser	United States
1997 (3rd)	Beautiful Thing	Hettie McDonald	Tony Garnett, Bill Shapter	United Kingdom
1997 (3rd)	Big Night	Campbell Scott, Stanley Tucci	David Kirkpatrick, Jonathan Filley	United States
1997 (3rd)	Fargo	Joel Coen, Ethan Coen	Ethan Coen	United States
1997 (3rd)	Marvin's Room	Jerry Zaks	Scott Rudin, Jane Rosenthal, Robert De Niro	United States
1997 (3rd)	Secrets & Lies	Mike Leigh	Simon Channing Williams	United Kingdom
1998 (4th)
1998 (4th)	L.A. Confidential	Curtis Hanson	Arnon Milchan, Curtis Hanson, Michael Nathanson	United States
1998 (4th)	The Full Monty	Peter Cattaneo	Uberto Pasolini	United Kingdom
1998 (4th)	Hollow Reed	Angela Pope	Elizabeth Karlsen, Nik Powell, Stephen Woolley	United Kingdom
1998 (4th)	Shall We Dance?	Masayuki Suo	Yasuyoshi Tokuma, Yasushi Urushido, Shigeru Ono, Kazuhiro Igarashi	Japan
1998 (4th)	The Sweet Hereafter	Atom Egoyan	Atom Egoyan, Camelia Frieberg	Canada
1998 (4th)	The Winter Guest	Alan Rickman	Steve Clark-Hall, Edward R. Pressman	United Kingdom
1999 (5th)
1999 (5th)	Gods and Monsters	Bill Condon	Paul Colichman, Gregg Fienberg, Mark R. Harris	United Kingdom, United States
1999 (5th)	Elizabeth	Shekhar Kapur	Tim Bevan, Eric Fellner, Alison Owen	United Kingdom
1999 (5th)	Happiness	Todd Solondz	Ted Hope, Christine Vachon	United States
1999 (5th)	High Art	Lisa Cholodenko	Jeff Levy-Hinte, Susan A. Stover, Dolly Hall	United States Canada
1999 (5th)	Life is Beautiful	Roberto Benigni	Gianluigi Braschi, Elda Ferri	Italy
1999 (5th)	The Opposite of Sex	Don Roos	David Kirkpatrick, Michael Besman	United States

=== 2000s ===
Year	Film	Director	Producer(s)	Country
2000 (6th)
2000 (6th)	Magnolia	Paul Thomas Anderson	JoAnne Sellar, Paul Thomas Anderson	United States
2000 (6th)	After Life	Hirokazu Kore-eda	Masayuki Akieda, Shiho Sato	Japan
2000 (6th)	American Beauty	Sam Mendes	Bruce Cohen, Dan Jinks	United States
2000 (6th)	Being John Malkovich	Spike Jonze	Michael Stipe, Sandy Stern, Steve Golin, Vincent Landay	United States
2000 (6th)	Boys Don't Cry	Kimberly Peirce	Jeffrey Sharp, John Hart, Eva Kolodner, Christine Vachon	United States
2000 (6th)	The Iron Giant	Brad Bird	Allison Abbate, Des McAnuff	United States
2000 (6th)	Rushmore	Wes Anderson	Barry Mendel, Paul Schiff	United States
2000 (6th)	The Winslow Boy	David Mamet	Sarah Green	United Kingdom
2001 (7th)
2001 (7th)	Requiem for a Dream	Darren Aronofsky	Eric Watson, Palmer West	United States
2001 (7th)	Beau Travail	Claire Denis	Patrick Grandperret	France
2001 (7th)	Crouching Tiger, Hidden Dragon	Ang Lee	Bill Kong, Hsu Li-kong, Ang Lee	China; Taiwan; Hong Kong; United States
2001 (7th)	Dancer in the Dark	Lars von Trier	Vibeke Windeløv	Denmark
2001 (7th)	The Five Senses	Jeremy Podeswa	Camelia Frieberg, Jeremy Podeswa	Canada
2001 (7th)	Judy Berlin	Eric Mendelsohn	Rocco Caruso	United States
2001 (7th)	Traffic	Steven Soderbergh	Edward Zwick, Marshall Herskovitz, Laura Bickford	Edward Zwick, Marshall Herskovitz, Laura Bickford
2002 (8th)
2002 (8th)	In the Mood for Love (TIE)	Wong Kar-wai	Wong Kar-wai	Hong Kong; France
2002 (8th)	Mulholland Drive (TIE)	David Lynch	Mary Sweeney, Alain Sarde, Neal Edelstein, Michael Polaire, Tony Krantz	United States; France
2002 (8th)	Amelie	Jean-Pierre Jeunet	Jean-Marc Deschamps, Claudie Ossard	France
2002 (8th)	Amores perros	Alejandro González Iñárritu	Alejandro González Iñárritu	Mexico
2002 (8th)	The Circle	Jafar Panahi	Jafar Panahi	Iran; Italy; Switzerland
2002 (8th)	In the Bedroom	Todd Field	Todd Field, Ross Katz, Graham Leader	United States
2002 (8th)	Memento	Christopher Nolan	Suzanne Todd, Jennifer Todd	United States
2002 (8th)	Yi Yi	Edward Yang	Shinya Kawai	Taiwan; Japan
2003 (9th)
2003 (9th)	Far From Heaven	Todd Haynes	Jody Allen, Christine Vachon	United States; France
2003 (9th)	Donnie Darko	Richard Kelly	Sean McKittrick, Nancy Juvonen, Adam Fields	United States
2003 (9th)	Punch-Drunk Love	Paul Thomas Anderson	JoAnne Sellar, Daniel Lupi, Paul Thomas Anderson	United States
2003 (9th)	The Piano Teacher	Michael Haneke	Veit Heiduschka	France; Austria; Germany
2003 (9th)	Thirteen Conversations About One Thing	Jill Sprecher	Beni Tadd Atoori, Gina Resnick	United States
2003 (9th)	Rabbit-Proof Fence	Phillip Noyce	Phillip Noyce, Christine Olsen, John Winter	Australia
2003 (9th)	Y tu mamá también	Alfonso Cuarón	Alfonso Cuarón, Jorge Vergara	Mexico
2004 (10th)
2004 (10th)	Lost in Translation	Sofia Coppola	Ross Katz, Sofia Coppola	United States Japan
2004 (10th)	28 Days Later	Danny Boyle	Andrew McDonald	United Kingdom
2004 (10th)	American Splendor	Shari Springer Berman, Robert Pulcini	Ted Hope, Christine Kunewa Walker, Julia King, Declan Baldwin	United States
2004 (10th)	Lilya 4-ever	Lukas Moodysson	Lars Jönsson	Sweden; Denmark
2004 (10th)	Spellbound	Jeffrey Blitz	Jeffrey Blitz, Sean Welch	United States
2004 (10th)	The Station Agent	Tom McCarthy	Mary Jane Skalski, Robert May, Kathryn Tucker	United States
2004 (10th)	The Triplets of Belleville	Sylvain Chomet	Viviane Vanfleteren, Regis Ghezelbash, Colin Rose	France, Belgium, Canada, United Kingdom
2005 (11th)
2005 (11th)	The Trilogy (TIE)	Lucas Belvaux	Diana Elbaum, Patrick Sobelman	France
2005 (11th)	Spring, Summer, Fall, Winter... and Spring (TIE)	Kim Ki-duk	Karl Baumgartner, Lee Seung-jae	South Korea, Germany
2005 (11th)	Bad Education	Pedro Almodóvar	Agustín Almodóvar, Pedro Almodóvar	Spain
2005 (11th)	Goodbye, Dragon Inn	Tsai Ming-liang	Hung-Chih Liang, Vincent Wang	Taiwan
2005 (11th)	Last Life in the Universe	Pen-ek Ratanaruang	Wouter Barendrecht, Nonzee Nimibutr	Thailand, Japan, Netherlands
2005 (11th)	Moolaadé	Ousmane Sembène	Ousmane Sembène, Thierry Lenouvel	Senegal; France; Burkino Faso
2005 (11th)	The Return	Andrey Zvyagintsev	Yelena Kovalyova, Dmitry Lesnevsky	Russia
2006 (12th)
2006 (12th)	Capote	Bennett Miller	Caroline Baron, William Vince, Michael Ohoven	United States
2006 (12th)	2046	Wong Kar-wai	Wong Kar-wai	Hong Kong; France; Italy; China; Germany
2006 (12th)	The Best of Youth	Marco Tullio Giordana	Angelo Barbagallo	Italy
2006 (12th)	Brokeback Mountain	Ang Lee	Diana Ossana, James Schamus	United States
2006 (12th)	Me and You and Everyone We Know	Miranda July	Gina Kwon	United States
2006 (12th)	Mysterious Skin	Gregg Araki	Gregg Araki	United States, Netherlands
2007 (13th)
2007 (13th)	Caché	Michael Haneke	Veit Heiduschka, Michael Katz, Margaret Ménégoz	France
2007 (13th)	Duck Season	Fernando Eimbcke	Jaime Bernardo Ramos, Frida Torresblanco	Mexico
2007 (13th)	Half Nelson	Ryan Fleck	Jamie Patricof, Alex Orlovsky, Lynette Howell, Anna Boden	United States
2007 (13th)	Inland Empire	David Lynch	Mary Sweeney, David Lynch	France, Poland, United States
2007 (13th)	Shortbus	John Cameron Mitchell	Howard Gertler, John Cameron Mitchell, Tim Perell, Alexis Fish	United States
2007 (13th)	Sorry, Haters	Jeff Stanzler	Jake Abraham, Karen Jaroneski, Jeff Stanzler, Gary Winick	United States
2008 (14th)
2008 (14th)	Once	John Carney	Martina Niland	Ireland
2008 (14th)	Linda Linda Linda	Nobuhiro Yamashita	Hiroyuki Negishi, Yuji Sadai	Japan
2008 (14th)	The Lives of Others	Florian Henckel von Donnersmarck	Max Weidemann, Quirin Berg	Germany
2008 (14th)	No Country for Old Men	Joel Coen, Ethan Coen	Scott Rudin, Ethan Coen, Joel Coen	United States
2008 (14th)	Protagonist	Jessica Yu	Elise Pearlstein, Susan West, Jessica Yu	United States
2009 (15th)
2009 (15th)	The Edge of Heaven	Fatih Akin	Fatih Akin, Klaus Maeck, Andreas Thiel, Jeanette Würl	Germany; Turkey
2009 (15th)	4 Months, 3 Weeks, 2 Days	Cristian Mungiu	Cristian Mungiu, Oleg Mutu	Romania
2009 (15th)	Happy-Go-Lucky	Mike Leigh	Simon Channing Williams	United Kingdom
2009 (15th)	Let the Right One In	Tomas Alfredson	Carl Molinder, John Nordling	Sweden
2009 (15th)	My Winnipeg	Guy Maddin	Michael Burns, Phyllis Laing, Guy Maddin, Jody Shapiro	Canada

=== 2010s ===
Year	Film	Director	Producer(s)	Country
2010 (16th)
2010 (16th)	The Hurt Locker	Kathryn Bigelow	Kathryn Bigelow, Mark Boal, Nicolas Chartier, Greg Shapiro	United States
2010 (16th)	35 Shots of Rum	Claire Denis	Bruno Pésery	France; Germany
2010 (16th)	Bad Lieutenant: Port of Call New Orleans	Werner Herzog	Stephen Belafonte, Randall Emmett, Avi Lerner, Alan Polsky, Gabe Polsky, Edward R. Pressman	United States
2010 (16th)	Still Walking	Hirokazu Kore-eda	Yoshihiro Kato, Satoshi Kōno, Hijiri Taguchi, Masahiro Yasuda	Japan
2010 (16th)	The White Ribbon	Michael Haneke	Stefan Arndt, Veit Heiduschka, Michael Katz, Margaret Ménégoz, Andrea Occhipinti	Germany
2011 (17th)
2011 (17th)	Winter's Bone	Debra Granik	Anne Rosellini, Alix Madigan-Yorkin	United States
2011 (17th)	I Killed My Mother	Xavier Dolan	Xavier Dolan, Carole Mondello, Daniel Morin	Canada
2011 (17th)	Jack Goes Boating	Philip Seymour Hoffman	Emily Ziff Griffin, Beth O'Neil, Peter Saraf, Marc Turtletaub	United States
2011 (17th)	The King's Speech	Tom Hooper	Iain Canning, Emile Sherman, Gareth Unwin	United Kingdom; Australia
2011 (17th)	Mother	Bong Joon-ho	Choi Jae-won, Seo Woo-sik	South Korea
2011 (17th)	Undertow	Javier Fuentes-León	Javier Fuentes-León	Peru; Colombia; France; Germany
2012 (18th)
2012 (18th)	The Artist	Michel Hazanavicius	Thomas Langmann	France
2012 (18th)	Another Year	Mike Leigh	Georgina Lowe	United Kingdom
2012 (18th)	Pariah	Dee Rees	Nekisa Cooper	United States
2012 (18th)	Poetry	Lee Chang-dong	Lee Joon-dong	South Korea; France
2012 (18th)	Weekend	Andrew Haigh	Tristan Goligher	United Kingdom
2013 (19th)
2013 (19th)	Perks of Being a Wallflower	Stephen Chbosky	Lianne Halfon, Russell Smith, John Malkovich	United States
2013 (19th)	Beasts of the Southern Wild	Benh Zeitlin	Dan Janvey, Josh Penn, Michael Gottwald	United States
2013 (19th)	Bullhead	Michaël R. Roskam	Savage Film	Belgium
2013 (19th)	Monsieur Lazhar	Philippe Falardeau	Luc Déry, Kim McCraw	Canada
2013 (19th)	Tyrannosaur	Paddy Considine	Diarmid Scrimshaw, Mark Herbert	United Kingdom
2014 (20th)
2014 (20th)	The Past	Asghar Farhadi	Alexandre Mallet-Guy	France; Italy; Iran
2014 (20th)	The Act of Killing	Joshua Oppenheimer, Christine Cynn	Signe Byrge Sørensen, Joram ten Brink, Michael Uwemedimo	Denmark, Indonesia, Norway, United Kingdom
2014 (20th)	Frances Ha	Noah Baumbach	Noah Baumbach, Scott Rudin, Lila Yacoub, Rodrigo Teixeira	United States
2014 (20th)	The Hunt	Thomas Vinterberg	Morten Kaufmann, Sisse Graum Jørgensen, Thomas Vinterberg	Denmark
2014 (20th)	Paradise: Faith	Ulrich Seidl	Ulrich Seidl	Austria
2014 (20th)	Short Term 12	Destin Daniel Cretton	Maren Olson, Asher Goldstein, Joshua Astrachan, Ron Najor	United States
2015 (21st)
2015 (21st)	Boyhood	Richard Linklater	Richard Linklater, Cathleen Sutherland, Jonathan Sehring, John Sloss	United States
2015 (21st)	Birdman	Alejandro González Iñárritu	Alejandro G. Iñárritu, John Lesher, Arnon Milchan, James W. Skotchdopole	United States
2015 (21st)	A Coffee in Berlin	Jan-Ole Gerster	Jan-Ole Gerster	Germany
2015 (21st)	Ida	Paweł Pawlikowski	Eric Abraham, Piotr Dzięcioł, Ewa Puszczyńska	Poland; Denmark; France; United Kingdom
2015 (21st)	Like Father, Like Son	Hirokazu Kore-eda	Kaoru Matsuzaki, Hijiri Taguchi	Japan
2015 (21st)	Mommy	Xavier Dolan	Xavier Dolan, Nancy Grant	Canada
2016 (22nd)
2016 (22nd)	Spotlight	Tom McCarthy	Blye Pagon Faust, Steve Golin, Nicole Rocklin, Michael Sugar	United States
2016 (22nd)	The Assassin	Hou Hsiao-hsien	Wen-Ying Huang, Liao Ching-Sung	Taiwan; China; Hong Kong
2016 (22nd)	The Duke of Burgundy	Peter Strickland	Andy Starke	United Kingdom
2016 (22nd)	Girlhood	Céline Sciamma	Bénédicte Couvreur	France
2016 (22nd)	Tangerine	Sean Baker	Sean Baker, Karrie Cox, Marcus Cox, Darren Dean, Shih-Ching Tsou	United States
2016 (22nd)	Timbuktu	Abderrahmane Sissako	Sylvie Pialat, Étienne Comar, Remi Burah, Oliver Pere	Mauritania; France
2016 (22nd)	White God	Kornél Mundruczó	Eszter Gyárfás, Viktória Petrányi	Hungary; Germany; Sweden
2016 (22nd)	Wild Tales	Damián Szifron	Agustín Almodóvar, Pedro Almodóvar, Esther García, Matías Mosteirín, Felipe Photiades, Gerardo Rozín, Hugo Sigman	Argentina; Spain
2017 (23rd)
2017 (23rd)	Moonlight	Barry Jenkins	Adele Romanski, Dede Gardner, Jeremy Kleiner	United States
2017 (23rd)	The Handmaiden	Park Chan-wook	Park Chan-wook, Syd Lim	South Korea
2017 (23rd)	Little Men	Ira Sachs	Lucas Joaquin, Christos V. Konstantakopoulos, Jim Lande, Ira Sachs, L. A. Teodosio	United States; Greece
2017 (23rd)	Manchester by the Sea	Kenneth Lonergan	Matt Damon, Kimberly Steward, Chris Moore, Lauren Beck, Kevin J. Walsh	United States
2017 (23rd)	Mountains May Depart	Jia Zhangke	Ren Zhonglun, Nathanaël Karmitz, Liu Shiyu, Shozo Ichiyama	China; France; Japan
2017 (23rd)	Our Little Sister	Hirokazu Kore-eda	Kaoru Matsuzaki, Hijiri Taguchi	Japan
2018 (24th)
2018 (24th)	Call Me By Your Name	Luca Guadagnino	Peter Spears, Luca Guadagnino, Emilie Georges, Rodrigo Teixeira, Marco Morabito, James Ivory, Howard Rosenman	Italy; United States; France; Brazil
2018 (24th)	After the Storm	Hirokazu Kore-eda	Kaoru Matsuzaki, Akihiko Yose, Hijiri Taguchi	Japan
2018 (24th)	I, Tonya	Craig Gillespie	Tom Ackerley, Margot Robbie, Steven Rogers, Bryan Unkeless	United States
2018 (24th)	Little Boxes	Rob Meyer	Jared Ian Goldman, Jordan Horowitz, Ken H. Keller, Caron Rudner	United States
2018 (24th)	Paterson	Jim Jarmusch	Joshua Astrachan, Carter Logan	United States
2019 (25th)
2019 (25th)	Shoplifters	Hirokazu Kore-eda	Matsuzaki Kaoru, Yose Akihiko, Taguchi Hijiri	Japan
2019 (25th)	Burning	Lee Chang-dong	Lee Joon-dong, Lee Chang-dong	South Korea; Japan
2019 (25th)	Leave No Trace	Debra Granik	Anne Harrison, Linda Reisman, Anne Rosellini	United States
2019 (25th)	Madeline's Madeline	Josephine Decker	Krista Parris, Elizabeth Rao	United States
2019 (25th)	The Rider	Chloé Zhao	Chloé Zhao, Mollye Asher, Bert Hamelinck, Sacha Ben Harroche	United States
2019 (25th)	Suspiria	Luca Guadagnino	Marco Morabito, Bradley J. Fischer, Luca Guadagnino, David Kajganich, Silvia Venturini Fendi, Francesco Melzi d'Eril	Italy; United States

=== 2020s ===
Year	Film	Director	Producer(s)	Country
2020 (26th)
2020 (26th)	Parasite	Bong Joon-ho	Kwak Sin-ae, Moon Yang-kwon, Bong Joon-ho, Jang Young-hwan	South Korea
2020 (26th)	And Breathe Normally	Ísold Uggadóttir	Skúli Malmquist	Iceland; Sweden; Belgium
2020 (26th)	Clemency	Chinonye Chukwu	Bronwyn Cornelius, Julian Cautherley, Peter Wong, Timur Bekbosunov	United States
2020 (26th)	The Last Black Man in San Francisco	Joe Talbot	Khaliah Neal, Joe Talbot, Dede Gardner, Jeremy Kleiner, Christina Oh	United States
2020 (26th)	The Mustang	Laure de Clermont-Tonnerre	Alain Goldman, Molly Hallam	France; Belgium; United States
2020 (26th)	Woman at War	Benedikt Erlingsson	Benedikt Erlingsson, Carine Leblanc, Marianne Slot	Iceland; France; Ukraine
2021 (27th)
2021 (27th)	Portrait of a Lady on Fire	Céline Sciamma	Bénédicte Couvreur	France
2021 (27th)	And Then We Danced	Levan Akin	Mathilde Dedye, Ketie Danelia	Sweden; Georgia; France
2021 (27th)	First Cow	Kelly Reichardt	Neil Kopp, Vincent Savino, Anish Savjani	United States
2021 (27th)	Never Rarely Sometimes Always	Eliza Hittman	Adele Romanski, Sara Murphy	United States; United Kingdom
2021 (27th)	Sound of Metal	Darius Marder	Bill Benz, Kathy Benz, Bert Hamelinck, Sacha Ben Harroche	United States
2022 (28th)
2022 (28th)	Quo Vadis, Aida?	Jasmila Žbanić	Damir Ibrahimović, Jasmila Žbanić	Bosnia and Herzegovina
2022 (28th)	The Card Counter	Paul Schrader	Braxton Pope, Lauren Mann, David Wulf	United States
2022 (28th)	The Killing of Two Lovers	Robert Machoian	Robert Machoian, Clayne Crawford, Scott Christopherson	United States
2022 (28th)	Red Post on Escher Street	Sion Sono	Masaya Takahashi, Hiroyuki Ogasawara	Japan
2022 (28th)	Titane	Julia Ducournau	Jean-Christophe Reymond	France
2023 (28th)
2023 (28th)	After Yang	Kogonada	Theresa Park, Andrew Goldman, Caroline Kaplan, Paul Mezey	United States
2023 (28th)	Aftersun	Charlotte Wells	Adele Romanski, Amy Jackson, Barry Jenkins, Mark Ceryak	United Kingdom
2023 (28th)	Drive My Car	Ryusuke Hamaguchi	Teruhisa Yamamoto	Japan
2023 (28th)	Petite Maman	Celine Sciamma	Bénédicte Couvreur	France
2023 (28th)	Triangle of Sadness	Ruben Östlund	Erik Hemmendorff, Philippe Bober	Sweden; Germany; France; United Kingdom
2024 (29th)
2024 (29th)	Past Lives	Celine Song	David Hinojosa, Christine Vachon, Pamela Koffler	South Korea; United States
2024 (29th)	Afire	Christian Petzold	Florian Koerner von Gustorf, Michael Weber, Anton Kaiser	Germany
2024 (29th)	The Kings of the World	Laura Mora Ortega	Cristina Gallego, Paz Lázaro, Elisa Fernanda Pirir, Regina Solórzano, Mirlanda Torres	Colombia; Luxembourg; France; Mexico; Norway
2024 (29th)	Monsters	Hirokazu Kore-eda	Hirokazu Kore-eda, Minami Ichikawa, Kenji Yamada, Megumi Banse, Taichi Itō, Hijiri Taguchi	Japan
2024 (29th)	The Quiet Girl	Colm Bairéad	Cleona Ní Chrualaoí	Ireland
2024 (29th)	R.M.N.	Cristian Mungiu	Cristian Mungiu	Romania; France; Belgium
2025 (30th)
2025 (30th)	Perfect Days	Wim Wenders	Wim Wenders, Takuma Takasaki, Koji Yanai	Japan; Germany
2025 (30th)	Bird	Andrea Arnold	Andrea Arnold, Lee Groombridge, Juliette Howell, Tessa Ross	United Kingdom; France; Germany; United States
2025 (30th)	Do Not Expect Too Much from the End of the World	Radu Jude	Radu Jude, Adrian Sitaru, Ada Solomon	Romania; Croatia; France; Luxembourg
2025 (30th)	Evil Does Not Exist	Ryusuke Hamaguchi	Satoshi Takata	Japan
2025 (30th)	His Three Daughters	Azazel Jacobs	Azazel Jacobs, Alex Orlovsky, Duncan Montgomery, Matt Aselton, Marc Marrie, Mal Ward, Lia Buman, Tim Headington, Jack Selby	United States
2025 (30th)	Sing Sing	Greg Kwedar	Cline Bentley, Greg Kwedar, Monique Walton	United States
