= Andrea Gets a Divorce =

2024 Austrian film by Josef Hader

- Theatrical release poster
- German: Andrea lässt sich scheiden
- Directed by: Josef Hader
- Written by: Josef Hader; Florian Kloibhofer
- Produced by: Michael Katz; Veit Heiduschka; Arash T. Riahi; Sabine Gruber
- Starring: Birgit Minichmayr
- Cinematography: Carsten Thiele
- Edited by: Roland Stöttinger
- Production companies: Wega Film; Golden Girls film production
- Distributed by: Filmladen; Paramount Pictures Germany [de]
- Release dates: 18 February 2024 (Berlinale); 23 February 2024 (Austria)
- Running time: 93 minutes
- Country: Austria
- Language: German

Andrea Gets a Divorce (German: Andrea lässt sich scheiden) is a 2024 Austrian drama film directed by Josef Hader. The film starring Birgit Minichmayr tells the story of rural policewoman Andrea, who wants a divorce and become a detective inspector in the city, but then gets involved in a hit-and-run when her drunken husband runs out in front of her car after a birthday party.

It was selected in the Panorama section at the 74th Berlin International Film Festival and was screened on 18 February 2024.

== Cast ==
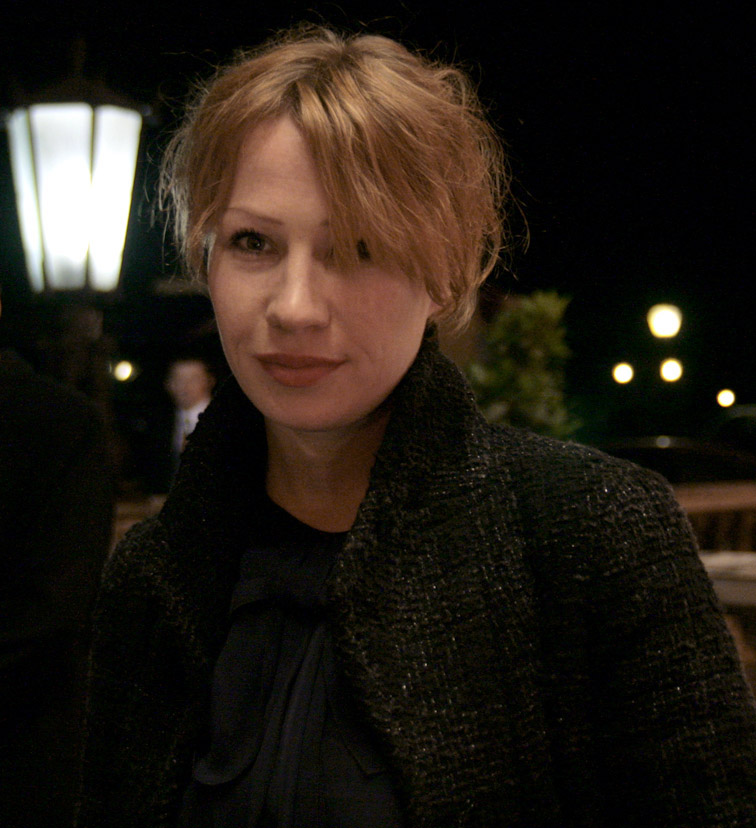
Birgit Minichmayr at the Romy TV awards 2009

- Birgit Minichmayr as Andrea
- Josef Hader as Franz
- Thomas Schubert as Georg
- Robert Stadlober as Walter
- Thomas Stipsits as Andy, Andrea's husband
- Branko Samarovski as Andrea's father
- Marlene Hauser as Gerti
- Margarethe Tiesel as Andy's mother
- Norbert Friedrich Prammer as Gerhard
- Michael Edlinger as Gerti's husband
- Michael Pink as Udo

== Production ==
The film co-financed by Österreichisches Filminstitut, Film Fund Vienna, Film Location Austria and State of Lower Austria, is the second feature film by Josef Hader after 2017 comedy film Wild Mouse. In addition to direction he has written script and played the role of the religious teacher Franz in the film.

The film was shot from 9 May 2022 to 24 June 2022 in Lower Austria.

== Release ==
Andrea Gets a Divorce had its world premiere on 18 February 2024, as part of the 74th Berlin International Film Festival, in Panorama.

Berlin-based Pluto Film Distribution Network has taken on world sales rights for the film.

It was released theatrically on 23 February in Austria and on 29 February 2024 in Germany.

It was screened at the Festival of Austrian Films on 6 April 2024.

== Reception ==
Susanne Gottlieb reviewing the film at Berlinale for Cineuropa wrote, "Josef Hader’s tragicomedy tells the story of a small-town policewoman who aspires to become something more, while running into unforeseen challenges."

== Accolades ==
Award	Date	Category	Recipient	Result	Ref.
Berlin International Film Festival	25 February 2024	Panorama Audience Award for Best Feature Film	Josef Hader	Nominated	
Festival of Austrian Films	8 April 2024	Grand Diagonale Prize of the Province of Styria – Feature Film	Josef Hader	Nominated	
