= Thomas Schubert =

Austrian actor (born 1993)

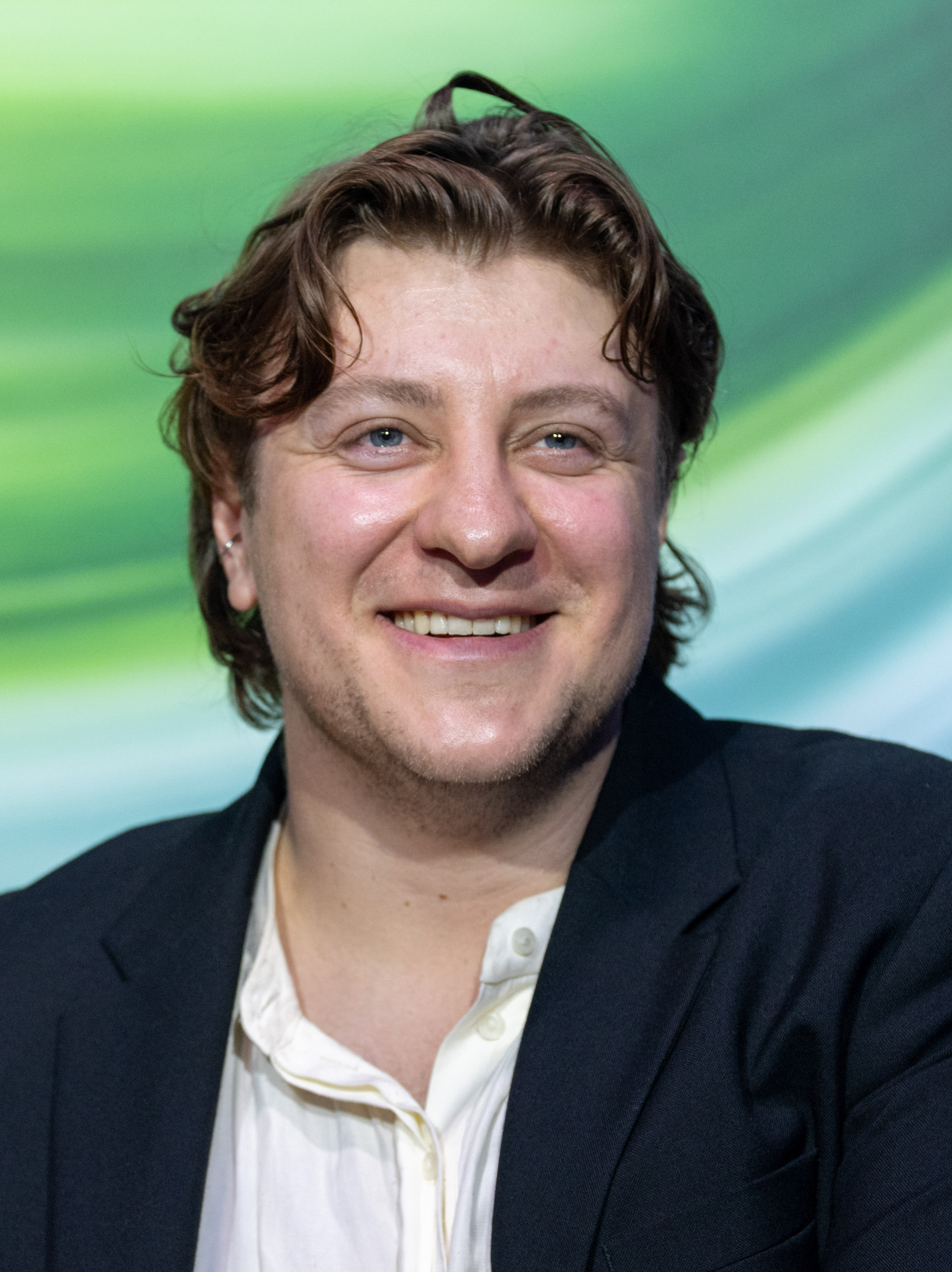
- Schubert at the 2025 Austrian Film Awards
- Born: 15 August 1993 (age 33); Vienna, Austria
- Occupation: Actor
- Years active: 2011–present

Thomas Schubert (born 15 August 1993) is an Austrian actor. He attained prominence through his acting in the Austrian feature film Breathing (2011).

== Life and career ==
The son of a dental technician and a teacher, Schubert was born in Vienna, Austria, where he grew up with two siblings. He spent a year in Australia with his family. He attended gymnasium in the Vienna district of Donaustadt, but dropped out in his final year to pursue a career in acting.

Schubert came to acting by chance when, as a 17-year-old student, he accompanied a friend to the open casting for Karl Markovics's 2011 feature film Breathing (German: 'Atmen'), which had been advertised at various schools. In his amateur acting debut, Schubert plays the role of a young prisoner who, while on day release, takes a job at a Viennese funeral home. Markovics had insisted on hiring an amateur actor for the leading role, which determined the casting of all the other actors. "I was looking for a non-professional actor because I didn't want a 22-year-old drama school graduate playing an 18-year-old; I really wanted an 18-year-old who is still a child in some moments," said Markovics.

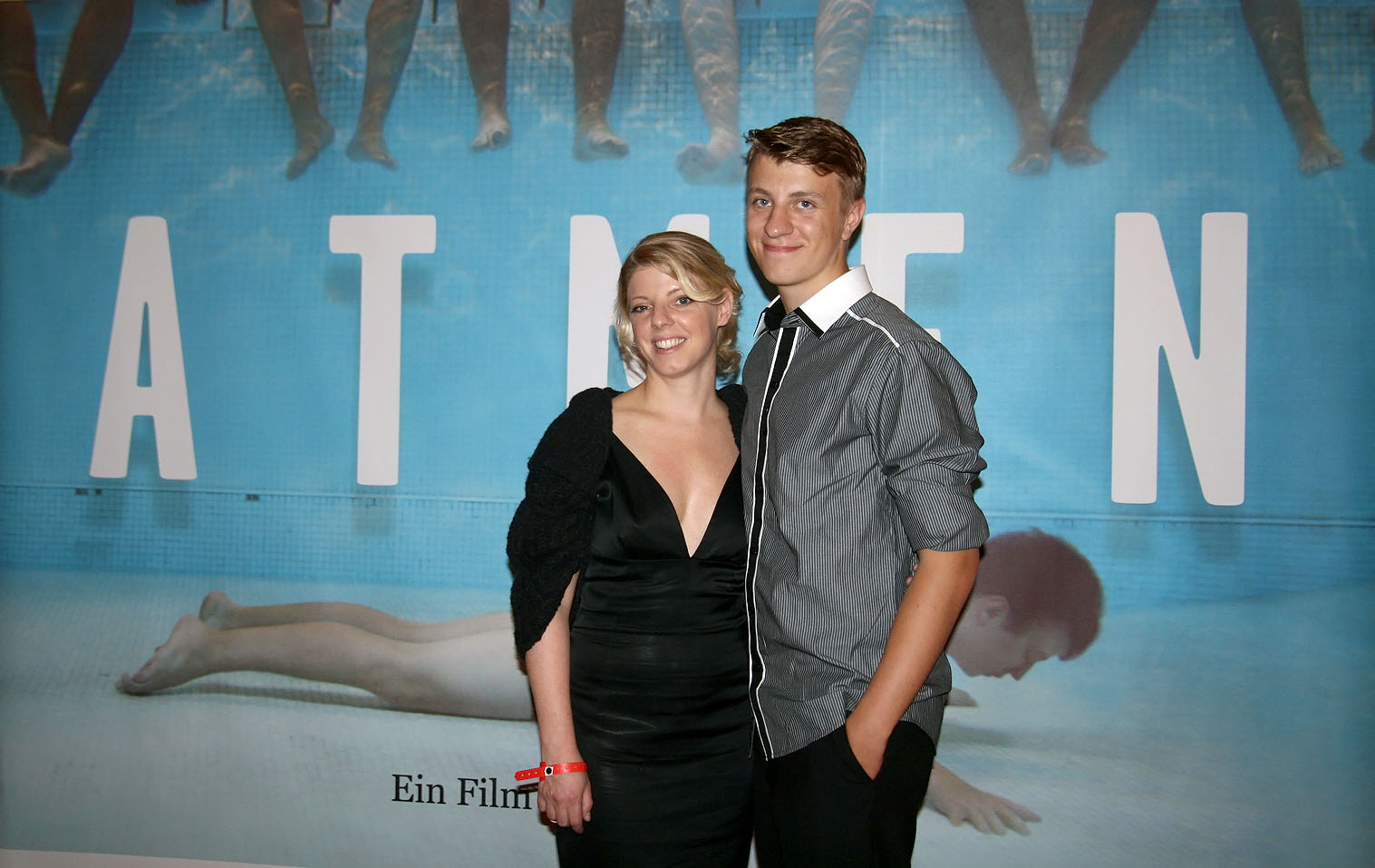
Schubert with fellow actress Karin Lischka at the Vienna premier of Breathing (2011)

Schubert was selected from approximately 300 candidates during three casting sessions. Director Karl Markovics placed great importance on his leading actor remaining authentic, so he only gave Schubert basic breathing and facial expression training. According to Schubert, the greatest challenge in assuming this role was maintaining concentration during long rehearsals.

Breathing premiered at the 64th Cannes Film Festival in 2011 in parallel to the Directors' Fortnight, where the film was awarded the Europa Award. Described as a "taciturn, documentary-like social drama", the film was critically acclaimed, screened at more than 60 film festivals, and was selected as Austria's candidate for the Academy Award for Best International Feature Film in 2012. Schubert also received praise, receiving the Best Actor Award at the Sarajevo Film Festival and the Austrian Film Award for his acting debut. The Austrian daily newspaper Kurier praised his talent for his sensitive and reserved performance as the introverted juvenile convict Roman Kogler. According to a review by German magazine Filmdienst, the inner drama plays out on the face of the "superb amateur actor". Additionally, Munich-based newspaper Süddeutsche Zeitung praised Schubert's facial expressions in the film.

Schubert described the success of Breathing as a "major turning point in his life", crediting his feature film debut for scoring him an appearance on the Austrian TV series Fast Forward in October 2011. He had further roles in the ORF miniseries Pregau, the TV film Das Sacher, and the crime-drama series SOKO Donau. Schubert soon reached a larger audience with a role on the Netflix original series King of Stonks, which was released mid-2022; in the series, he played the main character Felix Armand. For his portrayal of Leon in Christian Petzold's Afire (2023), he was nominated for Best Actor at the 36th European Film Awards. In May 2024, Schubert became a member of the European Film Academy.

== Filmography ==
- 2011: Breathing
- 2012: Fast Forward – Tommi Hotarek (TV series)
- 2014: The Dark Valley
- 2015: At the End of Summer
- 2015: Chucks
- 2016: Egon Schiele: Death and the Maiden
- 2016: Pregau – Kein Weg zurück (TV series)
- 2016: Fog in August
- 2016: Das Sacher
- 2017: Wild Mouse
- 2017: SOKO Donau
- 2018: Wintermärchen
- 2018: SOKO Kitzbühel – M 23
- 2019: Dein Leben gehört mir
- 2019: Stadtkomödie – Der Fall der Gerti B.
- 2020: Die Toten vom Bodensee – Fluch aus der Tiefe
- 2020: Tatort: Gefangen
- 2021: Windstill
- 2021: Risiken und Nebenwirkungen
- 2021: Polizeiruf 110: Bis Mitternacht
- 2022: Axiom
- 2022: Euer Ehren (TV series)
- 2022: King of Stonks (TV series)
- 2023: Im Schatten der Angst – Du sollst nicht lügen (TV movie)
- 2023: Afire
- 2023: Polizeiruf 110: Ronny
- 2023: Ein ganzes Leben
- 2024: Andrea Gets a Divorce
- 2026: The Girl with the Leica

== Awards ==
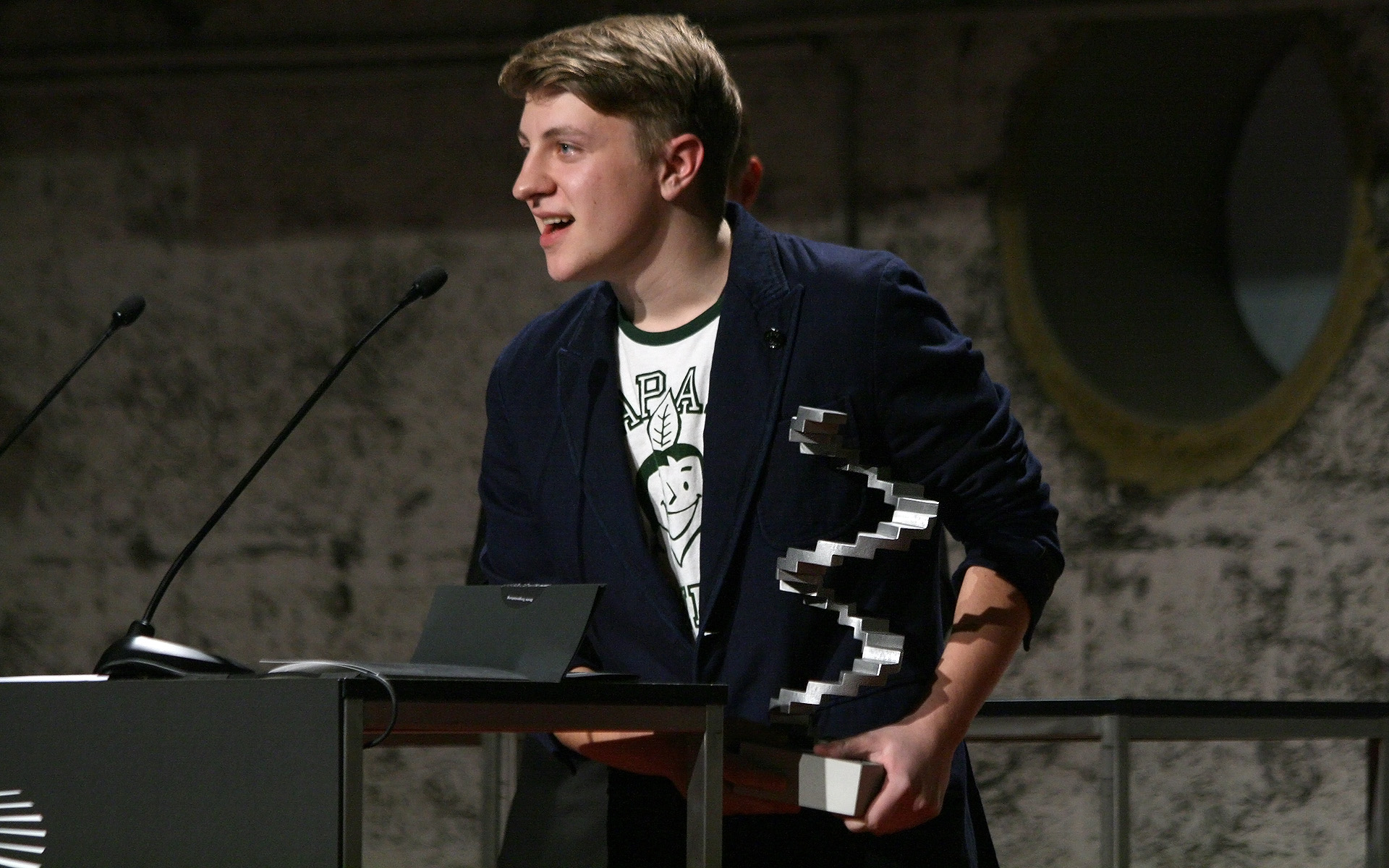
Schubert with the Actor Award at the 2012 Austrian Film Awards

- 2011: Sarajevo Film Festival Actor Award for Breathing (2011)
- 2012: Austrian Film Award in the category Best Actor for Breathing (2011)
- 2025: 2025 Austrian Film Award in the category Best Supporting Actor for Andrea Gets a Divorce (2024)
