= Langston Uibel =

German-British actor (born 1998)

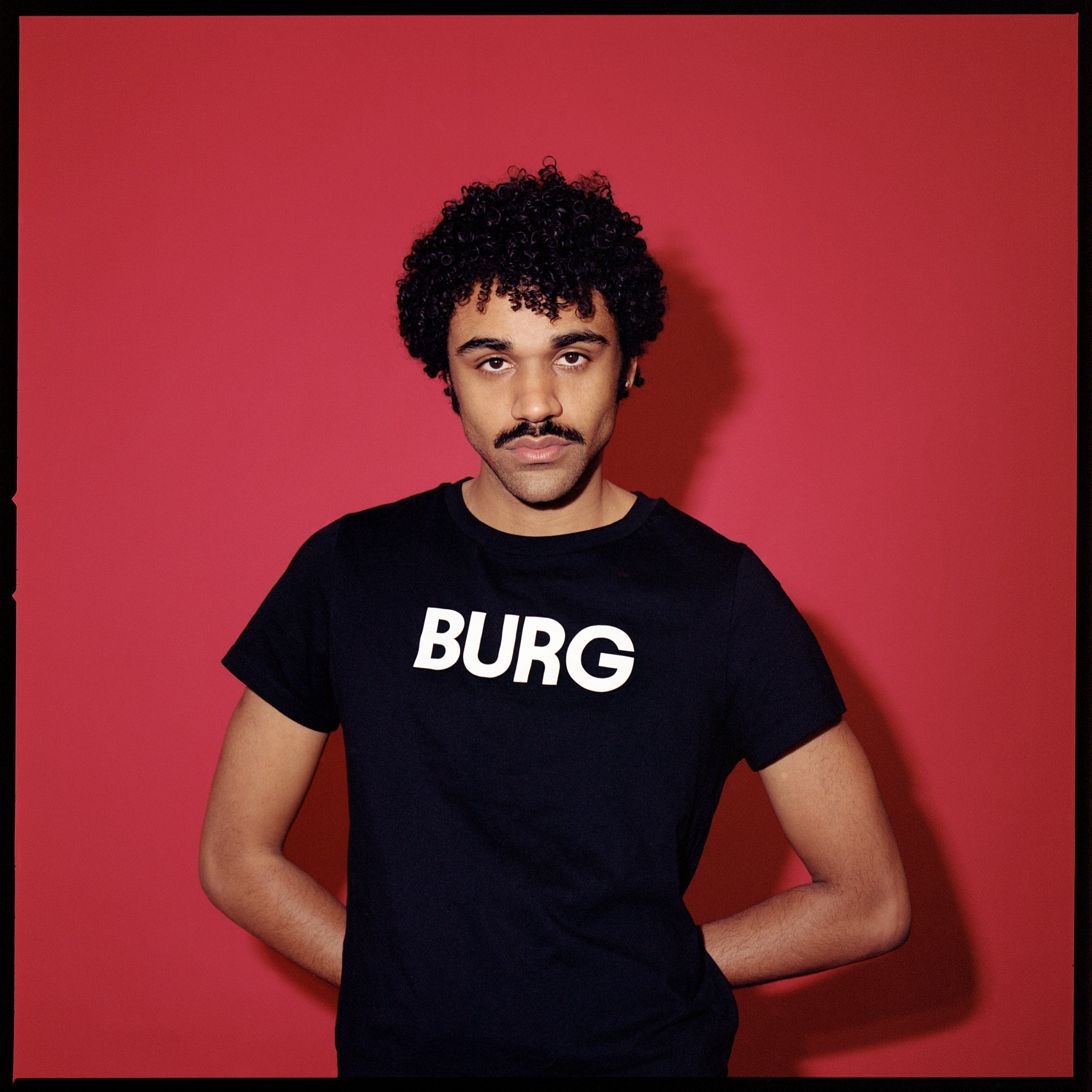
- Born: February 4, 1998 (age 28); London, England, UK
- Citizenship: British, German
- Occupation: Actor

Langston Uibel (born February 04, 1998) is a German-British actor who appeared in films, television series, and theaters. He is known for the Netflix series Dogs of Berlin (2018) and Unorthodox (2020), Christian Petzold’s Afire as well as the Apple TV series Hijack.

== Biography ==
Uibel was born in London, England, to a German mother and a Jamaican father. He lived in London until 2006, when his family moved to Berlin. He completed his Abitur at a bilingual English-German high school in Berlin and chose not to attend university, pursuing acting instead.

Uibel began acting at age nine in the 2008 film Speed Racer, directed by the Wachowskis. In the same year, he played a child soldier in the short film The String Puppet, screened at Berlinale Talents.

In 2013, he appeared in Hanni & Nanni 3 as a boarding school student. In 2014, he had a guest role in the crime series Letzte Spur Berlin. In Freistatt (2015), he portrayed an Afro-German student facing racial harassment. In 2017, he appeared in High Society and played Raphael Bou’Penga in Dogs of Berlin.

Uibel received the Blaue Blume Award in 2018 for his role in Liebesstreifen and the Young Icon Award in 2019 for Dogs of Berlin.

He played Finn in Isi & Ossi (2020) and portrayed Axmed in Unorthodox and its spin-off Unorthodox: The Next Chapter (2020–2023). In 2021, he joined How to Sell Drugs Online (Fast) as Joseph. In 2023, he appeared in Afire, which won the Silver Bear Grand Jury Prize at the Berlin International Film Festival.

In 2023, Uibel made his professional theater debut in A Midsummer Night’s Dream at Vienna’s Burgtheater, directed by Barbara Frey. He previously participated in youth productions at Berlin’s Schaubühne.

In addition, Uibel co-manages the Dalston Jazz Bar in London with his father, Robert Beckford. He has written about diversity in the film industry and contributed political opinion pieces to GQ Germany, Vogue, and Noizz.de.

Langston joins the Apple TV show Hijack for the second season.

== Filmography ==
Year	Title	Role	Notes
2007	Speed Racer	-	Feature film
2008	The String Puppet	Child Soldier	Short film
2011	Sellout	Main Child	TV short
2013	Hanni & Nanni 3	Internatsschüler	Uncredited
2014	Leichenschmaus (Funeral Feast)	Jamie Lark	Short film
2014	Oblivio	Samuel	Short film
2015	Freistatt (Sanctuary)	Anton	
2015	Letzte Spur Berlin (Last Trace Berlin)	Marvin Schmitz	TV series; 1 episode
2016	Les marées blanches	Citseko	Short film
2017	Berlin Station	Parking Valet	TV series; 1 episode
2017	High Society	Siddharta Schlonz	
2018	Dogs of Berlin	Raphael Bou'Penga	TV series; 8 episodes
2018	Um Himmels Willen (For Heaven's Sake)	Wolfi Wöller	TV series; 3 episodes
2018	Ein Fall für zwei (A Case for Two)	Martin	TV series; 1 episode
2018	SOKO Leipzig (Leipzig Homicide)	Raoul Merad / Bockel	TV series; 2 episodes
2018	Liebesstreifen (Love Strip)	Lasse	Short film
2018	Glanz ist für die meisten nur ein bisschen Licht (For Most People, Shine Is Just a Little Bit of Light)	Tyger	Short film
2019	Die Chefin (The Boss)	Romano Stäber	TV series; 1 episode
2020	Isi & Ossi	Finn, Rich Date	
2020	Unorthodox	Axmed	Miniseries; 4 episodes
2021	How to Sell Drugs Online (Fast)	Joseph	TV series; 6 episodes
2021	Tod von Freunden (Death of Friends)	Cem	Miniseries; 1 episode
2021	Girl Who Cried Wolf	Lars	Short film
2023	Roter Himmel (Afire)	Felix	
2023	A Night in Lisbon	-	Short film
2023	791 km	Polizist Kevin Fischer	
2023	Sechs auf einen Streich - Die verkaufte Prinzessin (The Bartered Princess)	Berthold	TV movie
2024	Zitronenherzen (Lemon Hearts)	Paolo	TV movie
2025	School of Champions	Oscar	TV series; 6 episodes

== Theater ==
- 2013: Der Ring: Next Generation – Ensemble, Deutsche Oper Berlin, directed by Robert Lehniger
- 2015: I. Here. – Schaubühne am Lehniner Platz, directed by Aline Bosselmann
- 2016: Herr der Fliegen (Lord of the Flies) – Ensemble, Deutsches Theater Berlin, directed by Robert Lehniger
- 2019: Vantablack – Berlin Theatertreffen, directed by Julia Wissert
- 2022: And I Dreamt I Was Drowning – Berlin Theatertreffen, directed by Kieran Joel
- 2023: A Midsummer Night's Dream – Burgtheater, directed by Barbara Frey
