= Rodica Doehnert =

German screenwriter

Rodica Doehnert (born 1960) is a German screenwriter.

== Life ==
Doehnert was born in Bucharest and studied at the College of Film and Television in Potsdam-Babelsberg. After graduation, she worked as a director and author for several years. Since 1996, she has mainly written books. She received the Robert Geisendörfer Prize for all the books for Florian: Love from the Heart, and The Dragons. To the successful TV films Hotel Adlon: A Family Saga and Das Sacher she contributed to the screenplay.

== Selected filmography ==
- 1995: Polizeiruf 110: Im Netz – Director: Rodica Doehnert
- 1999: Florian – Liebe aus ganzem Herzen – Director: Dominique Othenin-Girard
- 2000: Als uns Flügel wuchsen – Director: Donald Krämer
- 2001: Ich kämpfe, solange du lebst – Director: Donald Krämer
- 2002: Meine Tochter ist keine Mörderin – Director: Sherry Hormann
- 2003: Getting a Life – Director: Vivian Naefe
- 2004: Meine Tochter – mein Leben – Director: Bodo Fürneisen
- 2005: Polizeiruf 110: Schneewittchen – Director: Christiane Balthasar
- 2006: Die Pferdeinsel – Director: Josh Broecker
- 2006: Das Glück am anderen Ende der Welt – Director: Dietmar Klein
- 2006: Küss mich, Genosse! – Director: Franziska Meyer-Price
- 2007: Prager Botschaft – Director: Lutz Konermann
- 2008: Die Drachen besiegen – Director: Franziska Buch
- 2010: Am Kreuzweg – Director: Uwe Janson
- 2013: Hotel Adlon: A Family Saga (TV miniseries) – Director: Uli Edel
- 2014: Die Familiendetektivin (TV series, 9 episodes) – Director: Ulli Baumann
- 2016: Das Sacher – Director: Robert Dornhelm
- 2017: Ein Schnupfen hätte auch gereicht – Director: Christine Hartmann

== Publications ==
- 2016: Das Sacher: Die Geschichte einer Verführung, Roman zum Film, Europa Verlag, München 2016, ISBN 978-3-95890-043-1
