= Kuma (film) =

- Directed by: Umut Dag
- Screenplay by: Petra Ladinigg
- Story by: Umut Dag
- Produced by: Veit Heiduschka Michael Katz
- Cinematography: Carsten Thiele
- Edited by: Claudia Linzer
- Music by: Iva Zabkar
- Production company: Wega Film
- Release date: 2012
- Running time: 93 minutes
- Country: Austria
- Languages: German; Turkish

Kuma (Turkish: "concubine") is a 2012 Austrian film directed by Umut Dag about a Turkish immigrant family living in Vienna.

== Plot ==
Fatma, a housewife around 50, lives in Vienna with her husband Mustafa and their six children. She grew up in Turkey and clings to the traditions and values of the old country. Her son Hasan gets married in rural Turkey to the 19-year old Ayse. When the family takes Ayse to Vienna this is revealed as a charade. Ayse is to be the kuma (second wife) of Fatma's husband Mustafa. Ayse is welcomed by the family, although polygamy is illegal in Austria. Her presence in a foreign country marks her as an outsider. Tension grows between Western norms and Muslim beliefs.

== Cast ==
- Nihal G. Koldas as Fatma
- Begüm Akkaya as Ayse
- Vedat Erincin as Mustafa
- Murathan Muslu as Hasan
- Alev Imak as Kezvan
- Aliye Esra Salebci as Gülsen

== Reception ==
Kuma has won several international awards including the Special Audience Prize at the 2012 Lecce European Film Festival and the Golden Starfish Award at the 2012 Hamptons International Film Festival. At the 2012 Philadelphia Film Festival Begüm Akkaya won Honorable Mention in the category of Best Actress. The film was nominated for Best Debut Film at the 62nd Berlin International Film Festival.

Writing for The Guardian, Peter Bradshaw rated the film three stars out of five, and described it as "strongly and honestly acted", with "a strong hint of soapy melodrama". In a review for The Telegraph, Tim Robey awarded Kuma the same rating and described it as a "vigorous and engrossing debut".
