= Chlotrudis Society for Independent Films =

American nonprofit organization

- Formation: 1994
- Type: Professional entertainment media association
- Purpose: Honors outstanding achievement in independent and foreign films
- Headquarters: Jamaica Plain, Massachusetts, United States
- Region served: New England
- Members: 125 (2009)
- President: Michael Colford
- Website: chlotrudis.org

The Chlotrudis Society for Independent Films is a nonprofit organization that honors outstanding achievement in independent and world cinema. The organization gives out the Chlotrudis Awards. Membership in the society includes "the Boston film community...critics, film festival programmers, theater exhibitors, and representatives from consulates in Boston."

The organization was founded in 1994 by Michael Colford and was named after his and his boyfriend Trent's two cats Chloe and Gertrudis.

== Chlotrudis Awards ==
The Chlotrudis Awards are given out annually, beginning in 1995. According to the society's by-laws, to be eligible for an award, "a film cannot have been released on more than 1,000 screens nationally during its first four weeks. Films that only play festivals or are released direct to DVD are not eligible."

The Chlotrudis Awards were presented publicly beginning in 2000. They are given out in a ceremony usually held at the Brattle Theatre in Harvard Square in Cambridge, Massachusetts. As with the Academy Awards, Chlotrudis Award presentations involve live music and dance, movie clips, award envelopes, and a trophy (in this case, of a cat on a stick).

Special guests at past ceremonies have included Philip Seymour Hoffman, Agnès Godard, Atom Egoyan, Elliot Page, Genevieve Bujold, Kerry Washington, Sarah Polley, Dale Dickey, Thom Fitzgerald, Beth Grant, Maury Chaykin, Hirokazu Kore-eda and Paprika Steen.

== Current award categories ==
- Best Movie
- Buried Treasure
- Best Director
- Best Actress
- Best Actor
- Best Supporting Actress
- Best Supporting Actor
- Best Original Screenplay
- Best Adapted Screenplay
- Best Music in a Film
- Best Editing
- Best Cinematography
- Best Production Design
- Best Ensemble Cast
- Best Documentary
