= Breathing (film) =

2011 film

- Film poster
- Directed by: Karl Markovics
- Written by: Karl Markovics
- Starring: Thomas Schubert; Karin Lischka; Gerhard Liebmann
- Cinematography: Martin Gschlacht
- Release date: May 19, 2011 (Cannes)
- Running time: 90 minutes
- Country: Austria
- Language: German

Breathing (German: Atmen) is a 2011 Austrian art house drama film written and directed by Karl Markovics. The film concerns a 19-year-old inmate in a detention facility for juveniles, with a pending application for parole, who is challenged to reconsider his identity by a trial work-release job at a morgue. Starring Thomas Schubert, Karin Lischka and Gerhard Liebmann, it was screened at the 2011 Cannes Film Festival. Schubert won Best Actor at the 17th Sarajevo Film Festival for his performance, presented to him by Angelina Jolie.

The film was selected as Austria's submission to the 84th Academy Awards for Best Foreign Language Film, but it did not make the final shortlist.

== Plot ==
Roman Kogler is a 19-year old prisoner in an Austrian juvenile detention centre. The story appears to encompass a roughly two week period leading up to his parole hearing, during which time he starts a trial month employed as a mortuary attendant, a job being an important qualification for parole. Kogler appears in every scene, and the narrative arc concerns his emotional awakening, explored in the actor's facial expressions and postures, reinforced by visual symbolism and a sparse dialogue with other characters. Initially sullen, he's isolated from his fellow inmates, from the probation counselor who tries earnestly to help him, from the guards and from his new co-workers. As Roman endures stubbornly, with the passive, stoic indifference to his own fate of the truly hopeless, and as he begins to learn his new job, small events seem to awaken emotions in Kogler, leading to a new interest in understanding his own past and in the possibility of sympathetic relationships.

The first scene introduces Roman Kogler as he is interviewing for a job in a metal-working factory, and he is lying about his welding skills to the foreman. When the foreman moves to place a welder's mask on his face, he jumps back, uttering a stifled scream. Next, we see a bleak and empty roadway stretching off to an empty horizon; after a few moments, a car approaches on the left and Kogler appears from behind the camera, walking determinedly away at the right edge of the pavement, no reachable destination in sight. The car, having made a U-turn out of sight, returns to view and stops ahead blocking Kogler's progress and Kogler gets in the car, slamming the passenger door twice. The car is driven by Walter Fakler, Kogler's probation counselor, who has come to fetch Kogler after the disaster at the metalworking job. Sullen and laconic, Kogler is quietly, resentfully defiant with the earnest, exasperated Fakler. Returning Kogler to prison, Fakler hands him a newspaper, and admonishes him to look through the want ads, warning Kogler that he will expect to meet with him on Monday.

The movie proceeds through a series of glimpses of institutionalized routine. Returned to prison, we see Kogler disrobe and endure the ritualized strip search, which is apparently required at each re-entrance, administered with curt, routine efficiency by a uniformed officer and his assistant. This strip search is repeated twice more in the film with slight variations in the dialogue that further the story's progress. We see the end of the day along the prison hallway, as the solid steel doors of the cells are locked, and Kogler is left alone in his cell. The one recreational activity the audience is shown is a visit of the juvenile prisoners to an indoor swimming pool; Roman dives in and swims laps, ignoring and ignored by the other prisoners -- this scene, too, will be repeated twice more with variations. Every work day, he commutes by train into Vienna, passing an ad that shows a woman in a South Sea paradise which reads: "Tauchen Sie ein Ins Abenteuer! ("Dive Into Adventure!").

The mortuary where he works is apparently Vienna's giant Bestattung Wien (Funeral Vienna), where he and his co-workers are involved in transporting corpses from place-of-death and from morgue to cemetery in a large-scale, routinized operation. Initially, he is tasked only with observing. In his first encounters with corpses, his disgust and horror is barely suppressed. One of his co-workers seems actively hostile at first.

In one scene, Roman is working alone in a small workroom, wearing coveralls, removing the cases used to transport corpses from an industrial steam cleaning machine, and a small bird startles him. He opens a door, squats down to let the bird free, and then follows it out; the door is labeled "Notausgang" ("Emergency Exit").

After a chance encounter on the job with the naked corpse of a young woman who shares his surname, Roman seems to panic at the idea that this might be his mother, dead. Confirming that the corpse was not his mother leads Roman to locate his mother. He manages to find out where she lives and follows her into an IKEA store, where he sees her lying, like a corpse, on one of the beds. They later become re-acquainted and he tells her he's a diving instructor and soon heading to New Zealand (a reference to the subway advertisement). Back at her flat, he asks his mother why she gave him up and she tells him that it was the best thing she did in her life. She finds out his real occupation as an undertaker and confronts him after the end of his shift, outside the mortuary. She also confesses to him that the real reason that she gave Roman up was that, when he was a baby, she tried to suffocate him by placing a pillow over his face, to stop his crying.

The film ends with Roman leaving his parole hearing and visiting the grave of his teenage victim.

== Cast ==
- Thomas Schubert as Roman Kogler
- Karin Lischka as Margit Kogler, Roman's mother
- Gerhard Liebmann as Walter Fakler, Roman's probation officer
- Georg Friedrich as Rudolf Kienast, his co-worker at the mortuary
- Georg Veitl as Jürgen Hefor, a co-worker at the mortuary
- Stefan Matousch as Gerhard Schorn, Roman's supervisor at the mortuary
- Klaus Rott as Leopold Wesnik, a senior supervisor at the mortuary
- Martin Oberhauser as the prison guard who conducts a strip search each time Kolger returns to prison
- Reinhold G. Moritz as Josef Kallinger, the paternalistic monitor of the prisoners on the hallway where Roman's cell is located
- Luna Mijović as Mona, a young American tourist Roman encounters on the evening train back to prison
- Elena Dörfler as Walter Fakler's daughter, Roberta

== See also ==
- List of Austrian submissions for the Academy Award for Best Foreign Language Film
