= Time of the Wolf =

Le temps du loup
- Promotional poster
- Directed by: Michael Haneke
- Written by: Michael Haneke
- Produced by: Michael Katz; Veit Heiduschka; Margaret Ménégoz
- Starring: Isabelle Huppert; Daniel Duval; Béatrice Dalle; Patrice Chéreau
- Cinematography: Jürgen Jürges
- Edited by: Monika Willi
- Production companies: Arte France Cinéma; Bavaria Film; Canal+; Centre National de la Cinématographie; France 3 Cinéma; Wega Film
- Distributed by: Les Films du Losange (France); Filmladen (Austria); Ventura Film (Germany)
- Release dates: 20 May 2003 (Cannes); 8 October 2003 (France)
- Running time: 113 minutes
- Countries: France; Austria; Germany
- Languages: French; Romanian
- Budget: €8.82 million (est. US$10 million)
- Box office: $499,149

Time of the Wolf (French: Le temps du loup) is a 2003 French dystopian post-apocalyptic drama film written and directed by Austrian filmmaker Michael Haneke. Set in France at an undisclosed time, the plot follows the story of a family: Georges (Daniel Duval), Anne (Isabelle Huppert), and their two children, Eva (Anaïs Demoustier) and Ben (Lucas Biscombe). The film also stars Olivier Gourmet and Serge Riaboukine.

The film takes its title from Völuspá, an ancient Norse poem which describes the time before the Ragnarök. It received positive reviews.

== Plot ==
Following an unspecified apocalyptic event that has disrupted society, a middle-class French family—Anne, her husband Georges, and their children Eva and Ben—travel to their rural vacation home, hoping to find safety. Upon arrival, they discover the house already occupied by an armed man and his family. When Georges tries to de-escalate the situation, he is abruptly shot and killed. The intruding family allows Anne and her children to leave with only minimal belongings, forcing them to wander the surrounding countryside.

As Anne leads Eva and Ben through a landscape ravaged by collapse, they encounter evidence of widespread devastation: villages abandoned or hostile, burned livestock on pyres, and other desperate survivors unwilling or unable to help. They eventually meet a feral, emotionally detached teenage boy who has survived alone in the wild. Anne attempts to care for him as well, but the boy is wary.

After days of hardship, the group arrives at a railway station where other refugees have gathered, hoping that a train will eventually come. The station is populated by people of different ethnic backgrounds and social classes, and the group has a self-appointed leader named Koslowski. Tensions soon emerge over access to resources, which must be earned by bartering whatever possessions are left or by services, including sexual favors from the women.

Later Anne meets Béa, a woman also from the city, who whispers to Anne that she thinks their situation has something to do with "the Just," 36 righteous people who roam the earth, for whose sake the world escapes destruction.

Anne's daughter, Eva, grows close with the feral teenage boy, who soon abandons the community. The boy returns to steal one of the goats, which Eva perceives as a betrayal and immoral. At one point, Eva witnesses a rape occurring while the group is sleeping and throws herself over her sleeping brother to shield him.

Another moment of horror for Eva and Anne is the discovery that Georges’s killer, with his wife and child, has joined their group. Anne pleads to have them removed, but the larger group refuses, based on lack of evidence. There are similar accusations directed by one of the guards against a Romanian in Koslowski’s original group, accusing him of murdering a local farmer.

Entertainment at the station is provided by an old man who swallows razor blades and tells tales about people who throw themselves into fire, sacrificing themselves.

Anne's son, Ben, increasingly withdrawn and suffering from chronic nosebleeds, appears to be affected by an unexplained illness. One night, he leaves the camp alone and strips down before a burning fire on the tracks—an apparent act of sacrifice intended to stop a passing train. A man from the camp finds Ben just in time and pulls him away. He tells Ben that the willingness to die has been seen and understood, and that Ben’s life still holds value. He promises to tell the others about Ben’s strength, giving the child a reason to live.

Abruptly, the film cuts to its final scene: a silent, tracking shot from a moving train, gliding through a serene countryside. There are no passengers or voices and no signs of the refugees.

== Cast ==
- Isabelle Huppert as Anne Laurent
- Daniel Duval as Georges Laurent
- Béatrice Dalle as Lise Brandt
- Patrice Chéreau as Thomas Brandt
- Rona Hartner as Arina
- Maurice Bénichou as M. Azoulay
- Olivier Gourmet as Koslowski
- Brigitte Roüan as Béa
- Anaïs Demoustier as Eva
- Serge Riaboukine as The leader
- Lucas Biscombe as Ben
- Hakim Taleb as Young runaway
- Marilyne Even as Mme Azoulay
- Florence Loiret Caille as Nathalie Azoulay
- Michaël Abiteboul as The Armed man
- Luminița Gheorghiu as Mrs. Homolka

== Release ==
Time of the Wolf was screened in the 2003 Cannes Film Festival, out of competition. Patrice Chéreau, a member of that year's jury, stars in the film, which made the film ineligible for any award. The film also screened at the Sitges Film Festival where it won Best Screenplay and was in the running for Best Film. The film was released on DVD in 2004, and included a film trailer and brief biographies of the lead cast, besides the film.

=== Critical response ===
On review aggregator Rotten Tomatoes, Time of the Wolf holds an approval rating of 66%, based on 53 reviews, and an average rating of 6.8/10. Its consensus reads, "A lean and unsettling thriller." On Metacritic, the film has a weighted average score of 71 out of 100, based on 20 critics, indicating "Generally favorable reviews". Peter Bradshaw of The Guardian gave Time of the Wolf 4 out of 5, while Ed Gonzalez of Slant Magazine gave it 3 out of 4.

Desson Thomson of The Washington Post commented that "[he] would rather have a more interesting group of desperate people to spend my post-apocalyptic time with" while A.O. Scott of The New York Times said that "You can feel frightened and disturbed by this movie without being especially moved by it". According to Scott Foundas of the Variety Magazine, "Haneke demonstrates profound insight into the essence of human behavior when all humility is pared away, raw panic and despair are the order of the day, and man becomes more like wolf than man."

William Thomas of the Empire Online gave the film 2 out of 5, saying in his closing comments that "A superb European cast is wasted on a portrait of social breakdown that really has very little to say for itself".
