= Roman Kariolou =

Austrian film composer

Roman Kariolou (born 1983) is a Cypriot pianist and composer for TV and film. In addition to compositions for events in media and sport, he has written incidental and theme music for over fifty TV films and series as well as a number of documentaries since 2007.

Specialising in TV and documentary film music, he has composed for BBC, CBS, ZDF, ORF, Discovery Channel, Arte and RAI TV series. He has also been composed to write official songs and music for sport and media opening ceremonies, including the 2006 Winter Olympics in Turin and the official song for the EHF's Champions League.

== Education ==
He received violin lessons from the age of three and was invited to the Yehudi Menuhin School by Menuhin himself aged five. He was considered a child prodigy and performed in Vienna, London, Prague and Athens during his childhood. Thanks to a Zakhar Bron grant he studied for a year at the Musikhochschule Lübeck before moving in 1991 to the Universität für Musik und darstellende Kunst Wien, where he was taught by Jewgenia Tschugajewa. He continued his studies at the Mozarteum and under Tibor Varga at the Musikhochschule Graz. In 2004 he took a course in film-music at the Film Music Institute Los Angeles.

== Selected filmography ==
=== TV documentaries ===
- 2006–2017: Universum (18 episodes)
  - 2015: Wüstenkönige – Die Löwen der Namib
- 2007: Die Gräfin und die russische Revolution
- 2007: Entdecker der Wellness (2 episodes)
- 2014: Wo sich Himmel und Erde begegnen – 900 Jahre Stift Klosterneuburg
- 2017: Universum History – Maria Theresia – Majestät und Mutter
- 2015–2018: Terra Mater (7 episodes)

=== TV drama series ===
- 2012: Tatort (1 episode, 'Kein Entkommen')
- 2013: Die Landärztin (1 episode, 'Vergissmeinnicht')
- 2014 onwards: Landkrimi
  - 2014: Steirerblut
  - 2018: Steirerkind
  - 2019: Steirerkreuz
- 2016: Das Sacher (1 episode, 'In bester Gesellschaft')
- 2017: Tatort (1 episode, 'Virus')
- 2017–2019: Maria Theresia
- 2019: Vienna Blood

=== TV film ===
- 2008: Das Musikhotel am Wolfgangsee
- 2011: Shadows from the Past
- 2011: Die Abstauber
- 2013: Alles Schwindel
- 2013: Die verbotene Frau
- 2014: Die Kraft, die Du mir gibst
- 2015: Kleine große Stimme
- 2017: Für dich dreh ich die Zeit zurück
- 2019: Der beste Papa der Welt
- 2020: Love & Mazel Tov

== Prizes, awards and nominations ==
2009: Wiener Filmmusik-Preis
2016: US International Film- and Video Festival Award, for Vanishing Kings
2017: Gold Camera Award;:US International Video Festival, for Europe's Last Nomads

=== Nominations ===
- 2013: Best Music, for The Empress and the Forest, Green Screen Festival, Eckernförde
- 2015:Africa's Wild West, National Geographic
