= Das Sacher =

- Also known as: The Hotel Sacher: In Good Company
- Genre: Period drama
- Based on: Das Sacher. Geschichte einer Verführung by Rodica Doehnert
- Screenplay by: Rodica Doehnert
- Directed by: Robert Dornhelm
- Starring: Josefine Preuß; Laurence Rupp; Julia Koschitz; Florian Stetter; Robert Palfrader; Ursula Strauss; Jasna Fritzi Bauer; Robert Stadlober; Peter Simonischek; Simon Schwarz; Nina Proll; Bernhard Schir; Philipp Hochmair; Edin Hasanovic; Lili Epply; Thomas Schubert; Joachim Król; Dietmar Bär; Jürgen Tarrach; August Schmölzer
- Composer: Roman Kariolou
- Countries of origin: Austria; Germany
- Original language: German
- No. of seasons: 1
- No. of episodes: 2

Production
- Producers: Sarah Kirkegaard; Andreas Kamm; Oliver Berben; Kurt J. Mrwicka; Oliver Auspitz
- Cinematography: Marcus Kanter
- Editor: Andreas Kopriva
- Running time: 90 minutes per episode
- Production companies: MR Film; MOOVIE GmbH

Original release
- Network: ORF
- Release: 27 December – 28 December 2016
- Network: ZDF
- Release: 16 January – 18 January 2017

Das Sacher: In bester Gesellschaft (The Hotel Sacher: In Good Company) is an Austrian-German historical drama television series aired in two parts, directed by Robert Dornhelm and written by Rodica Doehnert, and based on the book Das Sacher. Geschichte einer Verführung The series was commissioned by the ORF and ZDF. The first part was aired on December 27, 2016 on ORF2.

The series, is set in the city of Vienna around 1900, it tells the story of Anna Sacher, the widow of Eduard Sacher, who was the founder and owner of the Hotel Sacher, home of the sachertorte. Eduard was the son of Franz Sacher, inventor of the famous Sachertorte. The story begins with Eduard’s death and Anna’s tough decision to take over the management of the Hotel. The series is based on real events of the time and also on the life of Anna Sacher and mixes them with fictional stories of the upper and lower classes.

== Plot ==
When Anna has to fight for her rights in court, she shows perfect skills for managing such challenges by acting in an authoritative manner, networking and pulling strings in order to succeed. At the same time, in the catacombs of the nearby opera, Marie, the illegitimate daughter of a hotel laundress, is kidnapped. Despite Anna being informed about this tragedy by the police, her daily routines continue uninterrupted.

At the lobby of the hotel, the young Princess Konstanze von Traunstein meets the publisher Martha Aderhold from Berlin. The friendship of the two women soon falters, as does Konstanze's double life as a best-selling author, when she begins an affair with Martha's husband, the unsuccessful writer Maximilian.

In addition, a dark secret of the family of Traunstein threatens to come to light when the young Marie returns unannounced. During this time Anna Sacher meets the legendary "Haus Österreich" at her hotel and gains more and more social influence, but the outbreak of the First World War will change their lives and that of their guests forever.
