= Wild Mouse (film) =

2017 film

- Film poster
- Directed by: Josef Hader
- Written by: Josef Hader
- Produced by: Michael Katz; Veit Heiduschka
- Starring: Nora von Waldstätten
- Cinematography: Xiaosu Han; Andreas Thalhammer
- Edited by: Ulrike Kofler; Monika Willi; Christoph Brunner
- Release dates: 11 February 2017 (Berlin); 17 February 2017 (Austria)
- Running time: 103 minutes
- Country: Austria
- Language: German

Wild Mouse (German: Wilde Maus) is a 2017 Austrian comedy film directed by Josef Hader. It was selected to compete for the Golden Bear in the main competition section of the 67th Berlin International Film Festival.

== Cast ==
- Josef Hader as Georg
- Pia Hierzegger as Johanna
- Jörg Hartmann as Waller
- Denis Moschitto as Sebastian
- Georg Friedrich as Erich
- Nora von Waldstätten as Redakteurin Fitz
- Crina Semciuc as Nicoletta
