= Gerardo Rozín =

Argentine journalist, producer and presenter (1970–2022)

- Born: 18 June 1970; Rosario, Santa Fe, Argentina
- Died: 11 March 2022 (aged 51); Buenos Aires, Argentina
- Occupations: Journalist; producer; radio and television presenter
- Years active: 1999–2022
- Spouses: Mariana Basualdo (before 2005) Carmen Bárbaro (m. 2008–2014)
- Partner(s): Eugenia Quibel (2015–2022)
- Children: 2

Gerardo Rozín (Latin American Spanish: [roˈsin]; 18 June 1970 – 11 March 2022) was an Argentine journalist, producer and radio and television presenter.

== Career ==
Rozín recounted that he was initiated into journalism by a friend when he was 12 years old.

Rozín was the producer of the television program Sábado Bus, hosted by Nicolás Repetto, in which he was also in charge of the segment "The Animal Question" that later continued as an independent program. He was also the producer of Hora Clave, a political program hosted by Mariano Grondona, and of Georgina and You, with Georgina Barbarossa

From 2015 to 2017, he co-hosted Morfi, Todos a la Mesa from Monday to Friday, firstly with Carina Zampini, and then in the last season with Argentine model Zaira Nara.

== Personal life ==
Rozín died in Buenos Aires on 11 March 2022, at the age of 51. He had been diagnosed with a malignant brain tumour a year prior.
