= Afire =

2023 film by Christian Petzold

- Theatrical release poster
- German: Roter Himmel
- Directed by: Christian Petzold
- Screenplay by: Christian Petzold
- Produced by: Florian Koerner von Gustorf; Michael Weber; Anton Kaiser
- Starring: Thomas Schubert; Paula Beer; Langston Uibel; Enno Trebs
- Cinematography: Hans Fromm
- Edited by: Bettina Böhler
- Production company: Schramm Film Koerner Weber Kaiser
- Distributed by: The Match Factory GmbH; Piffl Medien
- Release dates: 22 February 2023 (Berlinale); 20 April 2023 (Germany); 14 July 2023 (United States)
- Running time: 103 minutes
- Country: Germany
- Language: German
- Box office: $2.1 million

Afire (German: Roter Himmel, lit. 'Red Sky') is a 2023 German drama film directed by Christian Petzold, starring Thomas Schubert, Paula Beer, Langston Uibel and Enno Trebs. The relationship drama focuses on four people sharing a holiday home on the Baltic Sea.

The film won the Silver Bear Grand Jury Prize at the 73rd Berlin International Film Festival, where it had its world premiere on 22 February 2023. It was released theatrically in Germany on 20 April 2023. In August 2023, it was shortlisted as the German submission for the Academy Award for Best International Feature Film for the 96th Academy Awards.

== Plot ==
Friends Felix and Leon are driving to Felix's family holiday home on the Baltic Sea near Ahrenshoop. Their car breaks down near the cottage, and they take their luggage there on foot. Due to a scheduling mix-up, they find that the cottage is already inhabited by Nadja, a young woman working at the beach whose nighttime trysts keep Felix and Leon up.

At the cottage, Leon is preoccupied with the manuscript of his second novel, Club Sandwich, while Felix is less hurried about completing his photography portfolio. They both meet Nadja, who is accommodating, and Felix befriends her and her lover, the lifeguard Devid. Despite Nadja's overtures, Leon continues to resent her, Devid and, increasingly, Felix, who develops a romantic and sexual relationship with Devid. Leon stubbornly isolates himself from the trio. After much consternation, he allows Nadja to read his manuscript. She soon informs him that Club Sandwich is "bullshit", and that he knows it. Leon is upset by her remarks.

The next day, Leon's publisher Helmut visits the cottage so they can review the manuscript together. He is similarly unimpressed by Club Sandwich, and quickly connects with Felix, Devid, and especially Nadja, who invites him to dinner, ruining Leon's plans for a one-on-one meeting. Leon's jealousy is worsened when he realizes that Nadja is not a mere ice cream saleswoman, but a doctoral student in literature who shares many of Helmut's interests.

After dinner, ash from nearby wildfires begins to fall onto the cottage. Felix and Devid leave with a tractor to retrieve the abandoned car, and Helmut collapses to the ground. Leon is dazed, but Nadja acts quickly and drives him to the hospital, leaving Leon to follow on foot. On his way to the hospital, Leon sees a boar piglet burn to death.

In the morning, Helmut speaks with Nadja and Leon. He reveals to Nadja that he is terminally ill, and tells Leon to abandon Club Sandwich and write another book. On the walk back to the house, Nadja tries to comfort Leon, which he angrily rejects. She castigates him for his narcissism and leaves him alone on the beach. Remorseful, he follows her back to the cottage. As he begins to confess romantic feelings for her, the police arrive to inform them that Devid and Felix were killed in the fire.

At the morgue, Nadja and Leons view Felix and Devid's charred corpses, intertwined in death. Nadja breaks down in tears, but Leon stares at the bodies with detachment as he envisions intertwined corpses from Pompeii and Valdaro. She leaves without Leon, when he returns to the cottage, she is already gone. That night, he goes to the sea and sobs at the sight of the bioluminescent waves breaking.

Later, Leon visits Helmut's hospital room. They review his new manuscript, an autofiction based on his time at the cottage which is dedicated to Felix and utilizes his photography. Outside the hospital, he sees Nadja arriving to meet Helmut. They share a moment of mutual recognition.

== Cast ==
- Thomas Schubert as Leon
- Paula Beer as Nadja
- Langston Uibel as Felix
- Enno Trebs as Devid
- Matthias Brandt as Helmut
- Esther Ash as Ms. König, hotel manager
- Jennipher Antoni as Mrs. Roland, cashier
- Jonas Dassler
- Marieke Zwart as firefighter

== Production ==
In October 2020, Christian Petzold revealed his next film, a gay love story. He revealed that he wants to make a series of films loosely inspired by the classical elements of water, earth, fire and air. Starting with Undine in 2020, a tale of water nymph, fire will rise for Afire. The film was shot from 28 June 2022 to 17 August 2022 in Ahrenshoop.

== Release and reception ==
Afire had its premiere on 22 February 2023 as part of the 73rd Berlin International Film Festival, in competition. It was released in cinemas on 20 April 2023. The film also made it to 'Perlak' section of the 71st San Sebastián International Film Festival held from 22 to 30 September 2023.

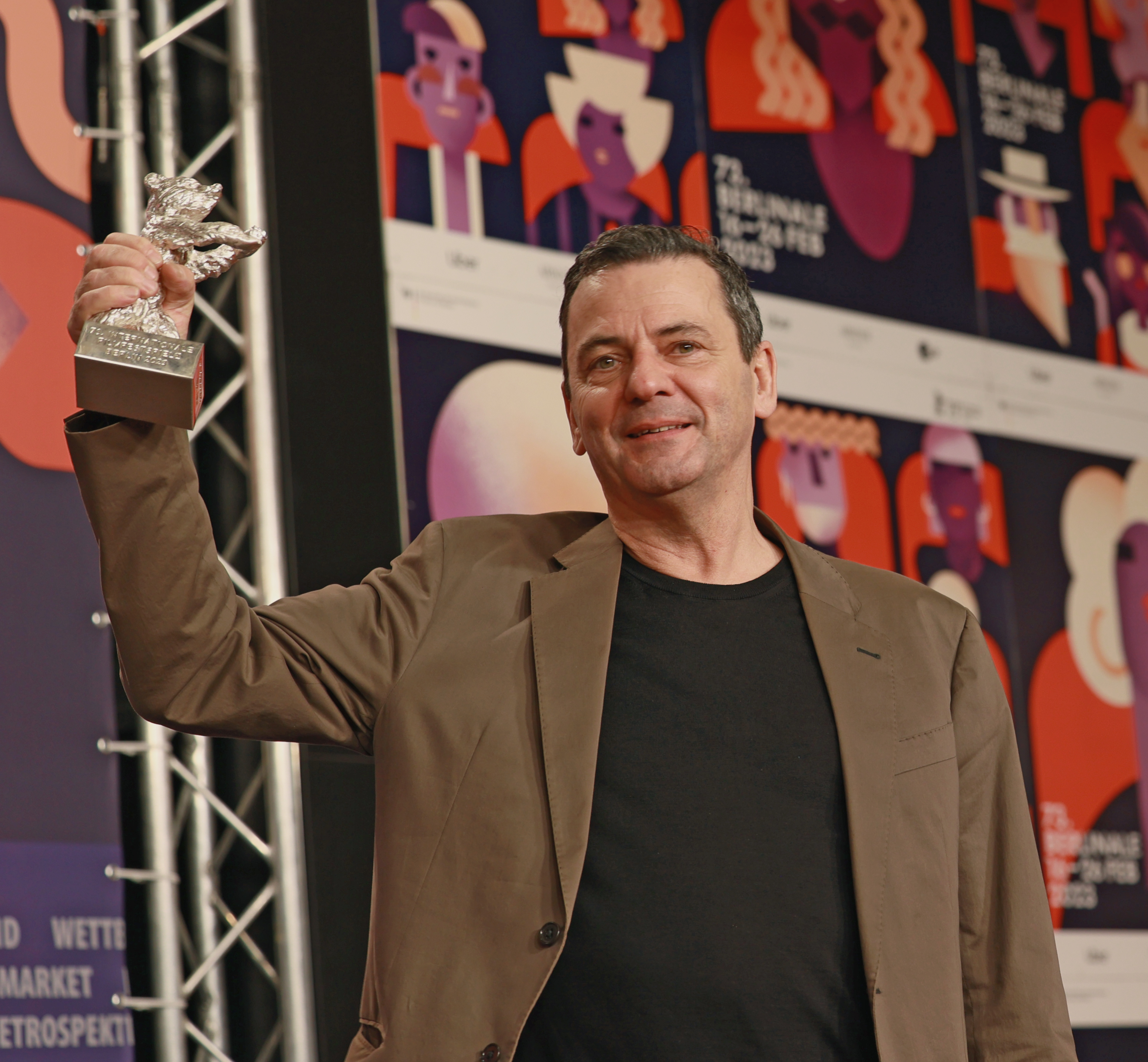
Christian Petzold, with the Silver Bear Grand Jury Prize for Afire

On the review aggregator website Rotten Tomatoes, the film holds an approval rating of 91% based on 125 reviews, with an average rating of 7.9/10. On Metacritic, it has a weighted average score of 82 out of 100 based on 28 reviews, indicating "universal acclaim".

Nicholas Bell in IonCinema.com graded the film 3.5/5 and wrote, "the real pleasure is in Petzold’s writing of his characters, and there’s an oddly satisfying authenticity to the discomforts and aggressions caused by Leon’s pretension-as-self-defense moments." Ben Croll reviewing for IndieWire graded the film B− and wrote, "Petzold tries to take the air out of a pompous windbag, and more often than not succeeds to delightful and caustic effect." Peter Bradshaw of The Guardian rated the film with 2 stars out of 5 and wrote, "The tonal change is not really convincing, and I wished that the film's potential for lighter comedy had been developed more. Even so, it’s a strong performance from Schubert. In The German Quarterly, Marco Abel compared the film's narrative to that of Roberto Rosselini's Viaggio in Italia, which also alludes to the intertwined bodies of Pompeii, and wrote of Afire's clear homage to Éric Rohmer's "summer films", which also depict thoughtful young protagonists in languid settings. Abel's article also noted criticism of Petzold's story, which "sacrifices the queer interracial couple [...] while allowing the (failed) heterosexual white couple [...] to survive and seemingly even thrive."

=== Accolades ===
Award	Date	Category	Recipient	Result	Ref.
Berlin International Film Festival	25 February 2023	Golden Bear	Christian Petzold	Nominated	
Berlin International Film Festival	25 February 2023	Silver Bear Grand Jury Prize	Christian Petzold	Won	
Sydney Film Festival	18 June 2023	Best Film	Afire	Nominated	
European Film Awards	9 December 2023	Best European Actor	Thomas Schubert	Nominated	
