= Robert Lehniger =

German theatre director, video artist and academic

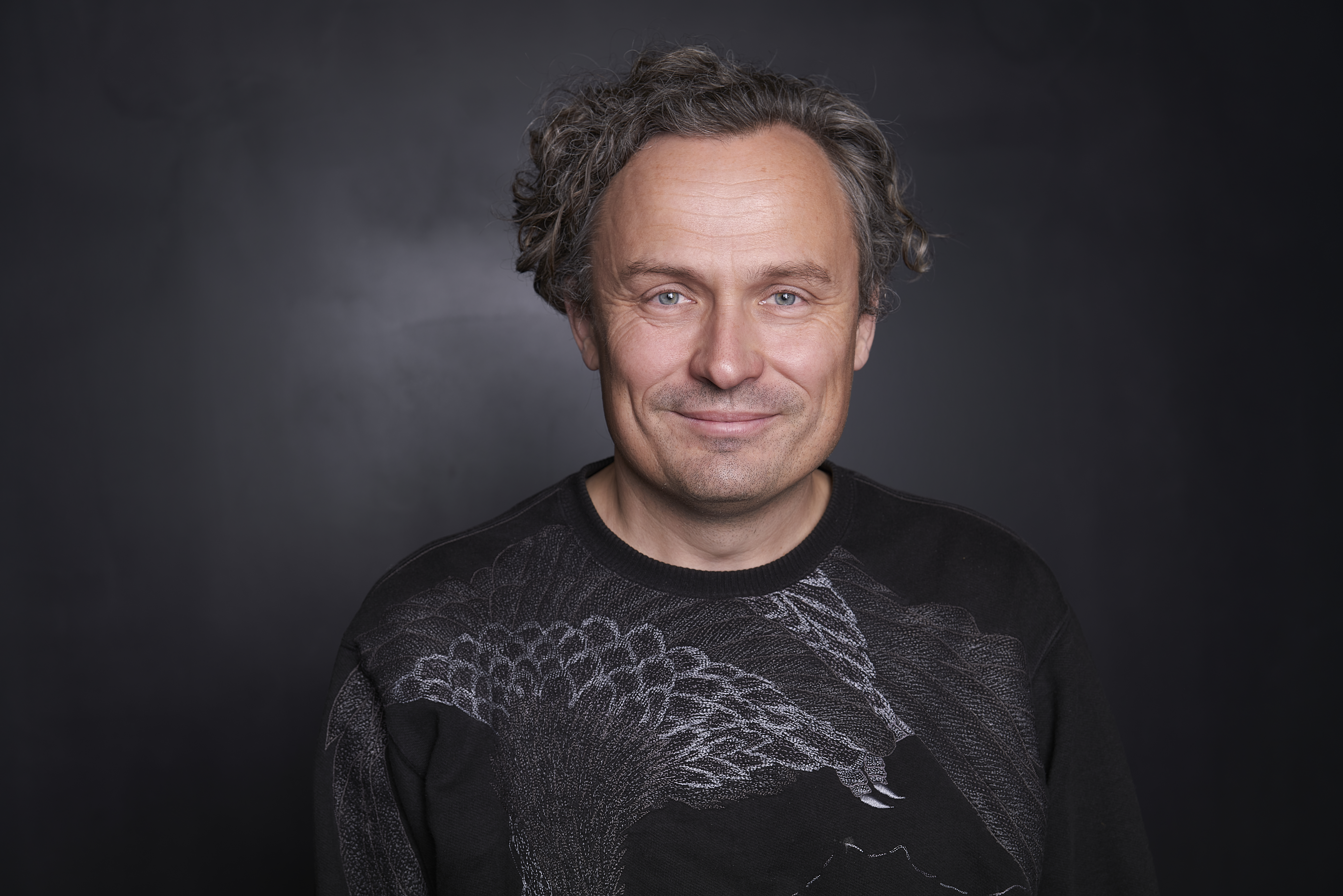
Robert Lehniger in 2021

Robert Lehniger (born 1974) is a German theatre director, video artist and academic. His work combines theatre, film and digital media.

== Life and career ==
Lehniger was born in Weimar in 1974. He studied media design, specialising in experimental television, at Bauhaus University Weimar. From 2000 to 2002, he worked as an assistant director at Theater Basel. He subsequently began working as a freelance theatre director and video artist, with productions at theatres and opera houses in Germany, Austria and Switzerland.

Lehniger's work is characterised by the integration of digital media into live performance and by the interaction between theatre and film. His productions have included a 2008 "remake" of Friedrich Hebbel's Nibelungen at Schauspiel Frankfurt, a 2010 stage adaptation of Jean-Luc Godard's film Weekend at the Theater am Neumarkt in Zürich, and a 2012 adaptation of Christian Kracht's novel Faserland at Schauspiel Hannover.

Since 2016, he has developed a series of mobile productions for the Düsseldorfer Schauspielhaus under the title "to go". The format takes adaptations of works from the German theatrical canon outside the conventional theatre space and presents them at different locations across Düsseldorf. Productions have included Faust (to go), Nathan (to go), Parzival (to go) and Johanna (to go).

In 2021, Lehniger's production of Corpus Delicti, based on the novel by Juli Zeh at the Deutsches Theater Berlin, was invited to the Ruhrfestspiele and to the Schäxpir theatre festival for young audiences in Linz.

== Higher Education and European Film Culture ==
From 2019 to 2022, Lehniger was professor of acting and head of the acting programme at Cours Florent Berlin.

In September 2022, he became Principal of the MetFilm School in Berlin.

Lehniger served as stage director of the ceremony for the 36th European Film Awards in Berlin in 2023.

For the 38th European Film Awards, held in Berlin on 17 January 2026, Lehniger again served as stage director. He was part of the creative team alongside filmmaker and curator Mark Cousins and composer Dascha Dauenhauer. Cousins conceived the ceremony as a "live film-essay", while Dauenhauer developed its musical concept.

In June 2026, Lehniger became a member of the European Film Academy.

In July 2026, he was appointed Professor of Directing at BIMM University.

== Productions (selection) ==
- 2005, Schauspiel Frankfurt: God Save Amerika by Biljana Srbljanović
- 2009, Schauspiel Hannover: The Dreamers, based on the novel by Gilbert Adair
- 2013, Deutsche Oper Berlin: Der Ring: Next Generation, based on works by Richard Wagner, with Alexandra Holtsch
- 2018, Düsseldorfer Schauspielhaus: Nathan (to go) by Gotthold Ephraim Lessing
- 2022, Schauspielhaus Bochum: On Connection by Kae Tempest
- 2023, Düsseldorfer Schauspielhaus: Johanna (to go), based on The Maid of Orleans by Friedrich Schiller
