= Veit Heiduschka =

Austrian film producer (born 1938)

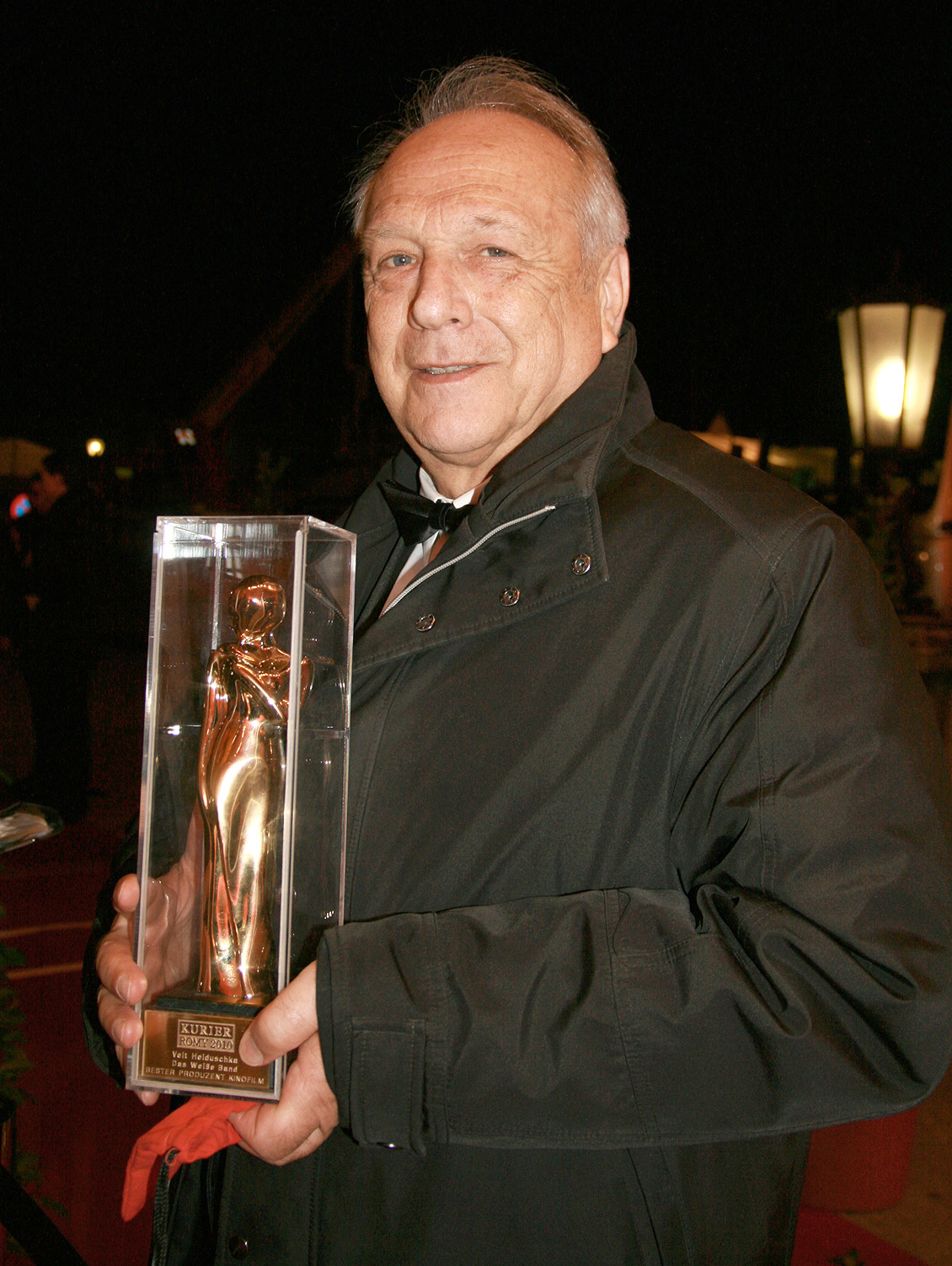
- Born: 20 May 1938 (age 88); Austria
- Occupation: Film producer
- Years active: 1985–present

Veit Heiduschka (born 20 May 1938) is an Austrian film producer. He has produced 50 films since 1985. He was nominated for the Academy Award for Best Picture for Amour along with Margaret Ménégoz, Stefan Arndt and Michael Katz in 2013.

== Selected filmography ==
- The Seventh Continent (1989)
- Kinder der Landstrasse (1992)
- Benny's Video (1992)
- Funny Games (1997)
- The Piano Teacher (2001)
- Everyman's Feast (2002)
- Time of the Wolf (2003)
- Caché (2005)
- For a Moment, Freedom (2008)
- The White Ribbon (2009)
- Amour (2012)
- Andrea Gets a Divorce (2024)
