= Michael Katz (producer) =

Austrian film producer (born 1954)

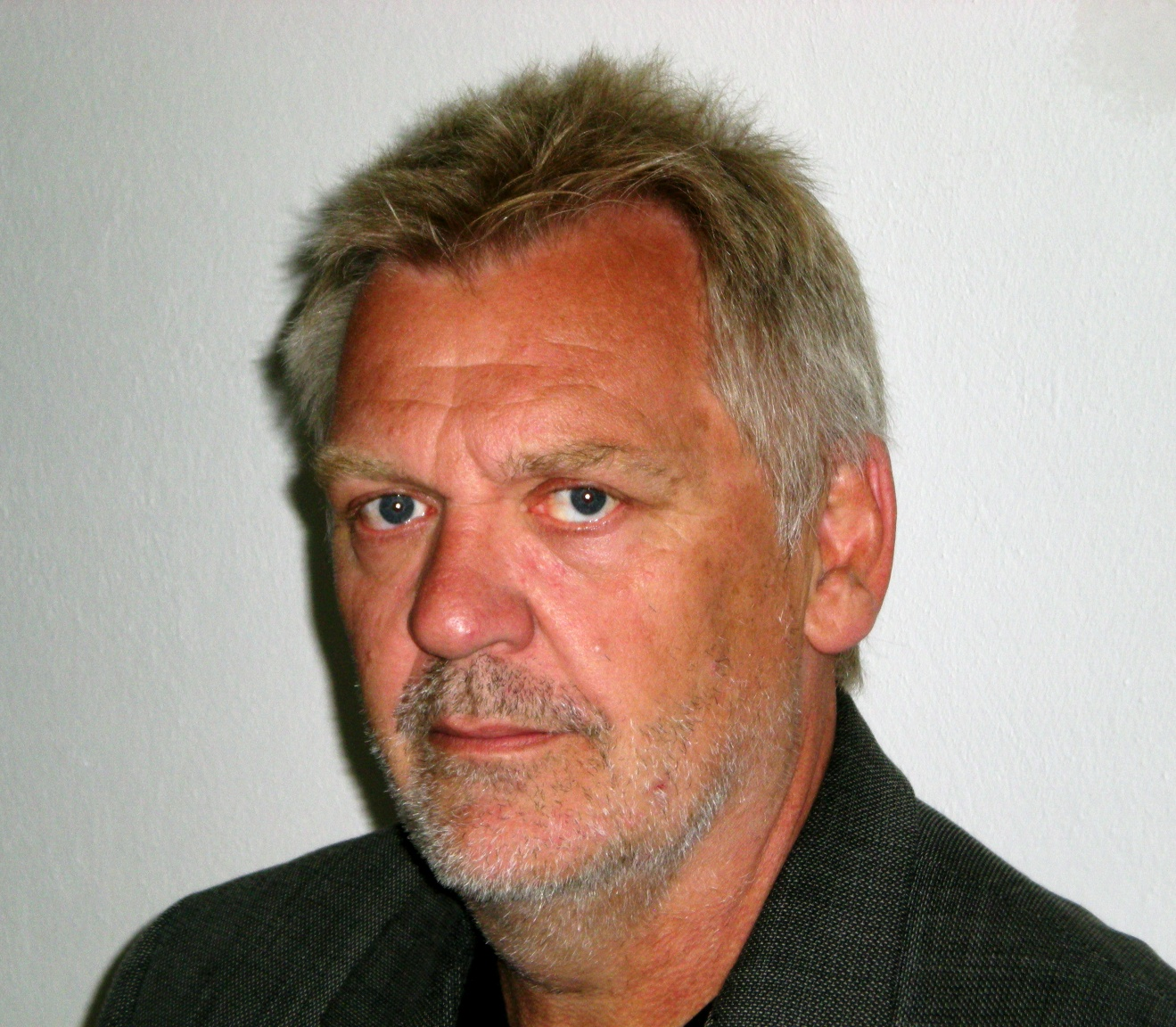
- Michael Katz (2009)
- Born: 28.01.1954; Austria
- Occupation: Film producer
- Years active: 1988–present

Michael Katz is an Austrian film producer. He has produced films for cinematic release as well as made-for-television movies and television series. He has worked with Michael Haneke on most of his films, including Amour. He was nominated for the Academy Award for Best Picture for Amour along with Margaret Menegoz, Stefan Arndt and Veit Heiduschka in 2013.

== Selected filmography ==
- Sternberg - Shooting Star (1989)
- Benny's Video (1992)
- Der Fall Lucana (1993)
- Die 3 Posträuber (1998)
- The Piano Teacher (2001)
- Everyman's Feast (2002)
- Time of the Wolf (2003)
- Welcome Home (2004)
- Caché (2005)
- For a Moment, Freedom (2008), executive producer
- The White Ribbon (2009)
- Local Hero (2010)
- Kuma (2011)
- When Santa Fell to Earth (2011)
- Amour (2012)
- Beloved Sisters (2013)
- Cracks in Concrete (2013)
- Hangover in High Heels (2014)
- Andrea Gets a Divorce (2024)
